= Korvichelma =

Village in Telangana, India

Korvichelma is a village located in Dandepalle mandal of the Manchireal district, Telangana state. Its original or ancient name is Rajampet. It got its nickname "Police Peta" due to more number of persons from this village are in state police services. The village population is approximately 3000. It is located 10 km across the Godavari River. It is connected by road from Luxettipet to Utnoor. It is 25 km away from the Mancherial Railway Station.

This village has notable places to visit

1. Hanuman Temple
2. Sri Rama Temple
3. Doragari Bangla
4. Shanukkunta Cheruvu
5. Venkatraopet BSV Cheruvu
6. Kundelapahad ( Agriculture Site ) i.e Korvichelma Fields
7. Peddayya Gutta Temple (nearest)
8. Chinnayya Gutta Temple (nearest)

Korvichelma is a grama panchayat village. It has government schools for the classes from 1 to 5 in MPPS Korvichelma and ZPHS Korvichelma school for 6 to 10th standard, both are located in the same place side by side and has a dedicated post office too i.e Korvichelma PO. This village is surrounded by villages West : muthyampet & chinthapalli, East: kommugudem, South : venkatraopet and North : forest. This village has no direct bus facilities, we need to travel muthyampet or luxettipet (Bus stand ) to get bus services and to mancherial railway station for Indian Railway Services. From mancherial railway station we have direct intercity trains to Hyderabad, Kazipet and express trains to New Delhi.

Below you can see some pictures of Korichelma Fields

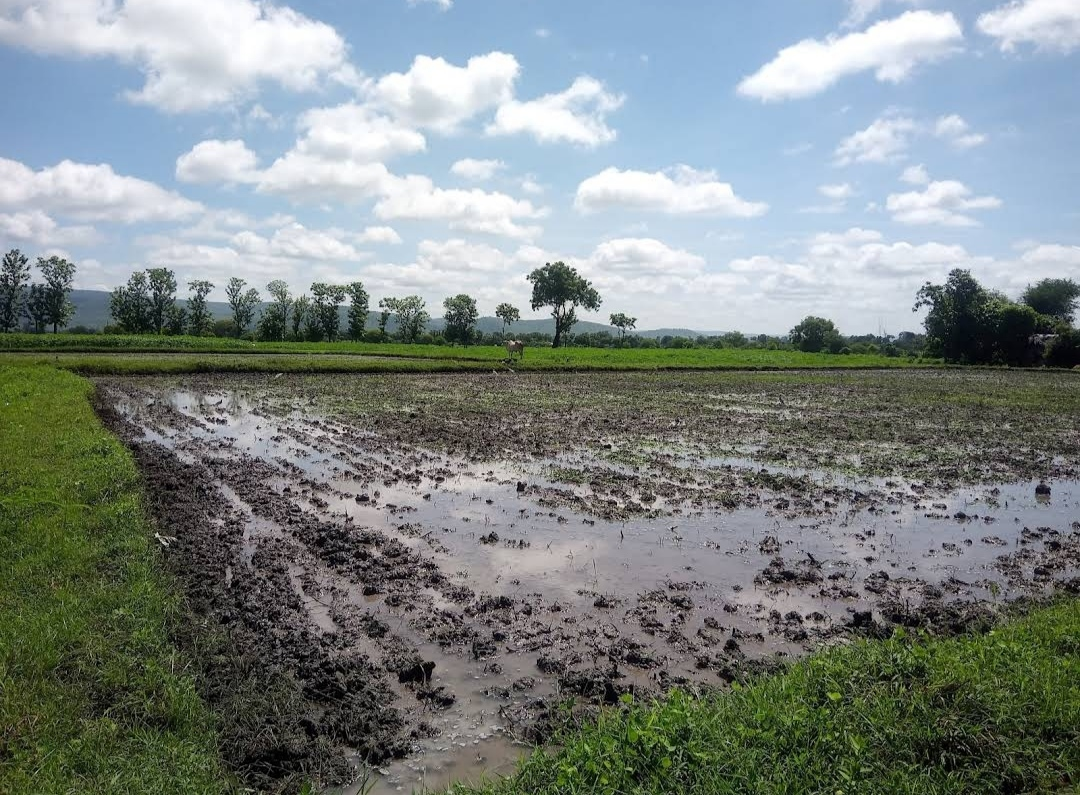
Korvichelma Fields

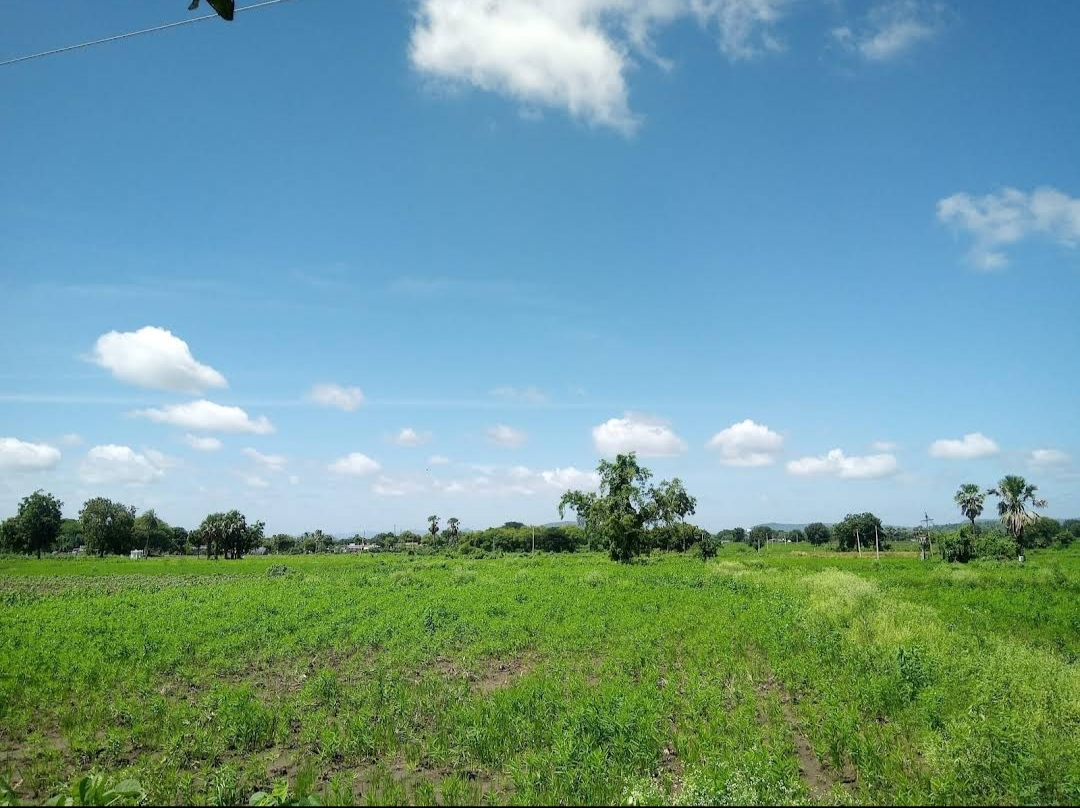
Korvichelma Fields

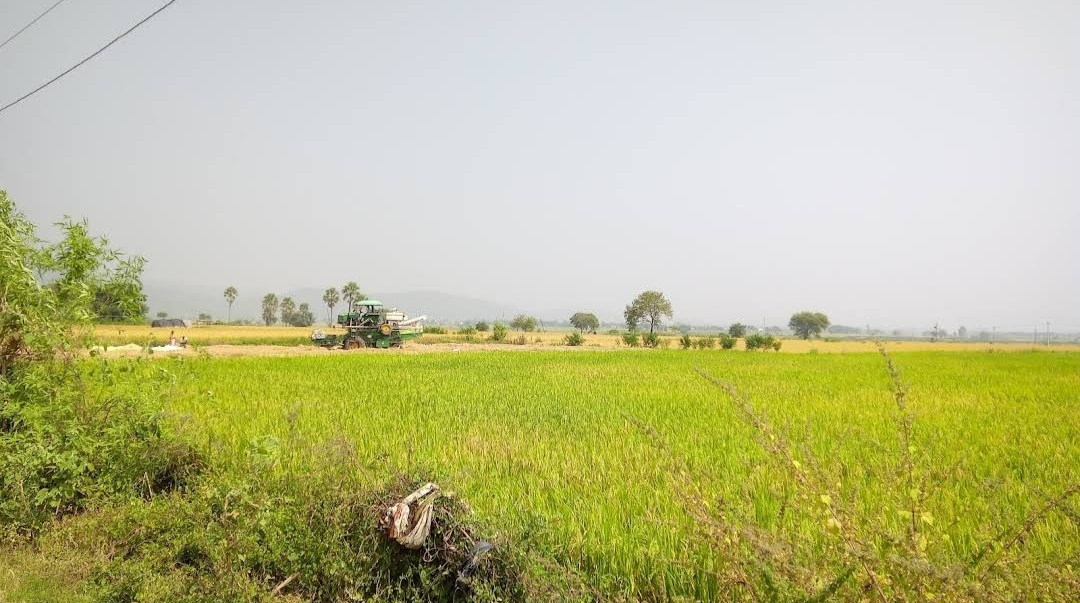
Korvichelma Fields

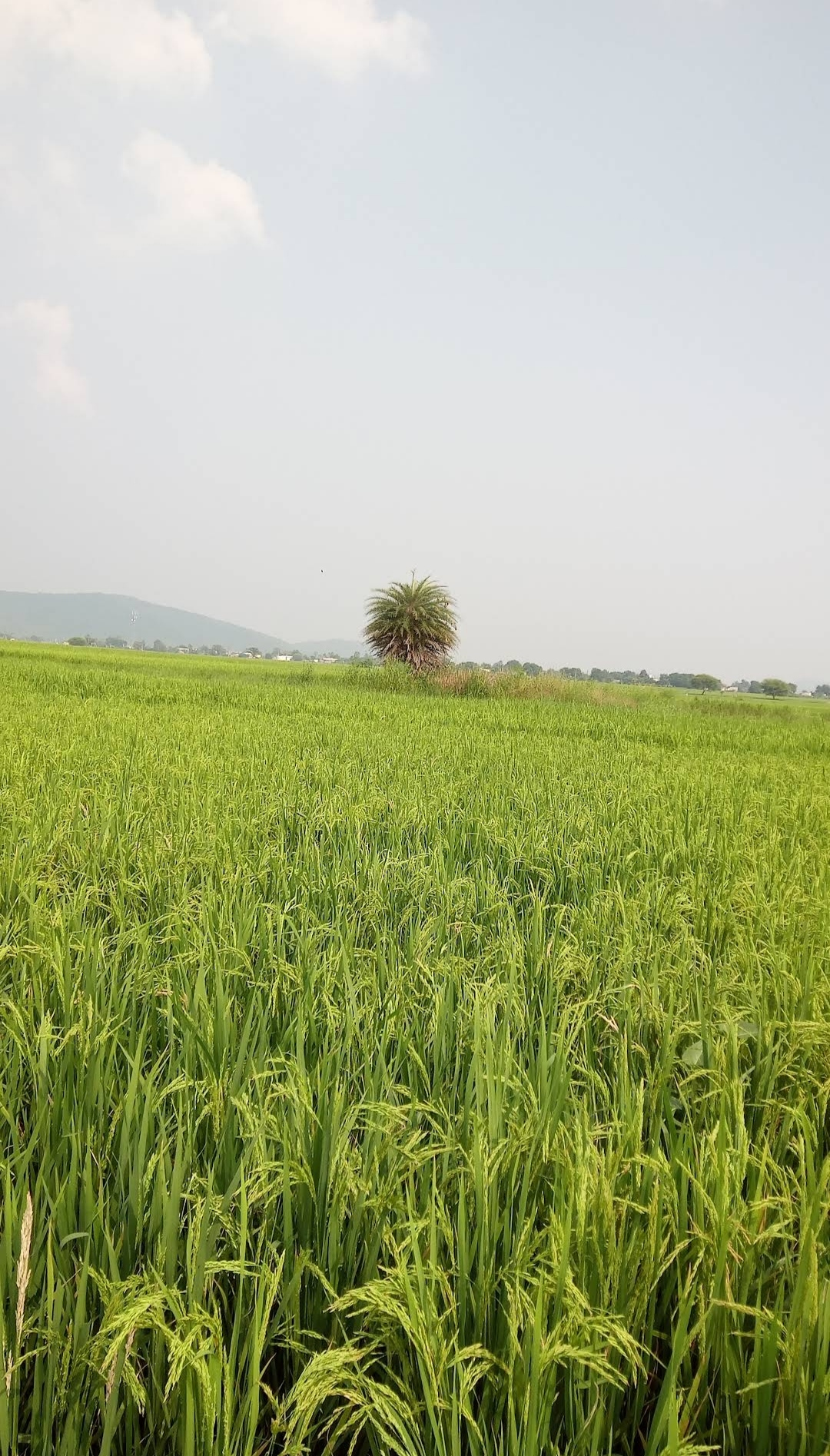
Korvichelma Fields

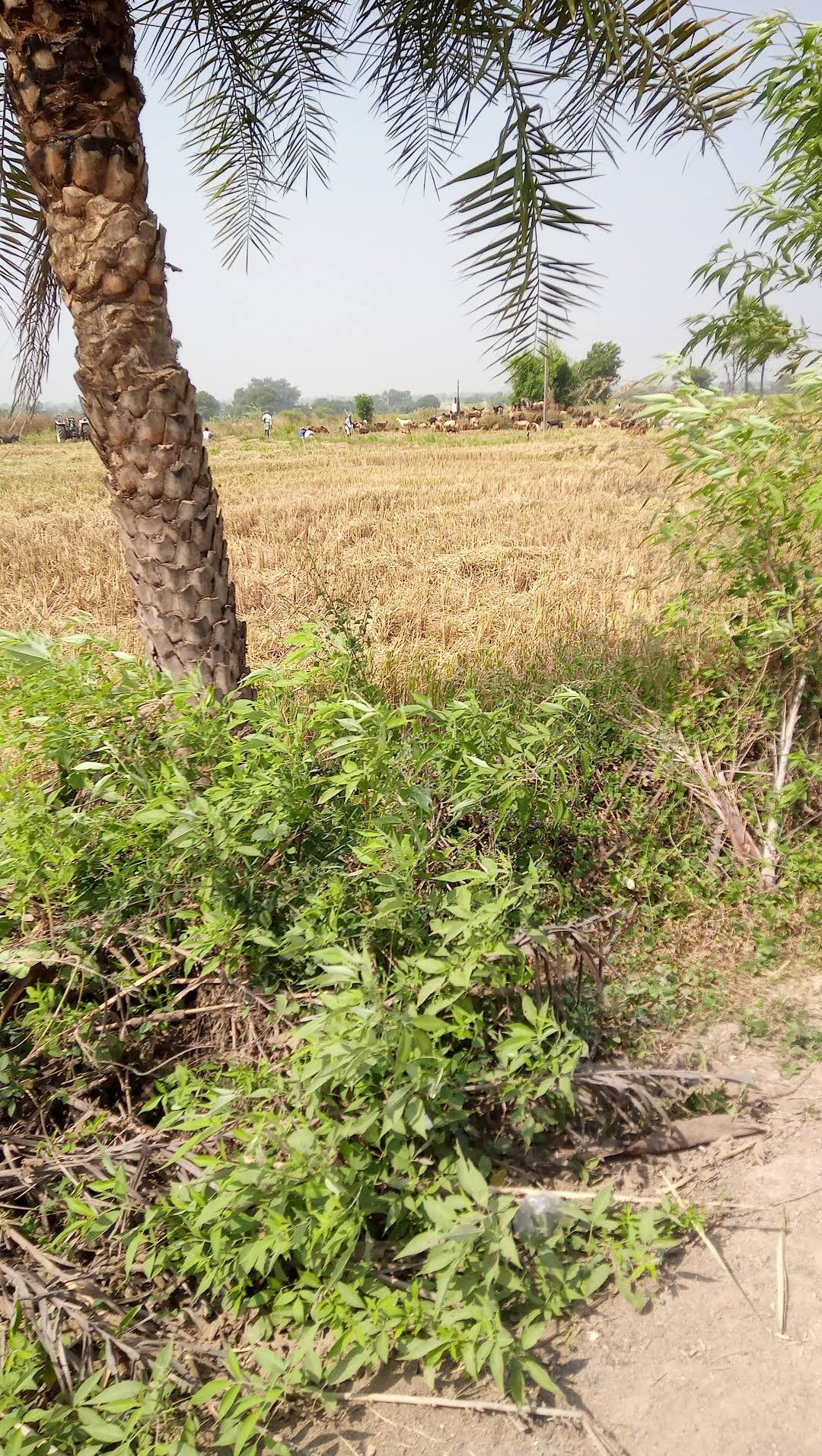
Korvichelma Fields
