= National Highway 363 (India) =

National highway in India

National Highway 363
- Map of National Highway 363 in red

Route information
- Auxiliary route of NH 63
- Length: 94.6 km (58.8 mi)

Major junctions
- South end: Mancherial
- North end: Wankidi

Location
- Country: India
- States: Telangana

Highway system
- Roads in India; Expressways; National; State; Asian
← NH 63	→ NH 363

National Highway 363, commonly referred to as NH 363 is a national highway in India. It is a spur road of National Highway 63. NH-363 traverses the state of Telangana in India.

== Route ==
Indaram (Mancherial), Mandamarri, Bellampalli, Tandur, Rebbana, Asifabad, Wankidi - Telangana/Maharashtra border.

== Junctions ==
NH 63
NH 363

NH63 from Jagdalpur to Nizamabad has been connected to NH363 near Mancherial, where the construction of Trumpet Interchange has been undertaken.

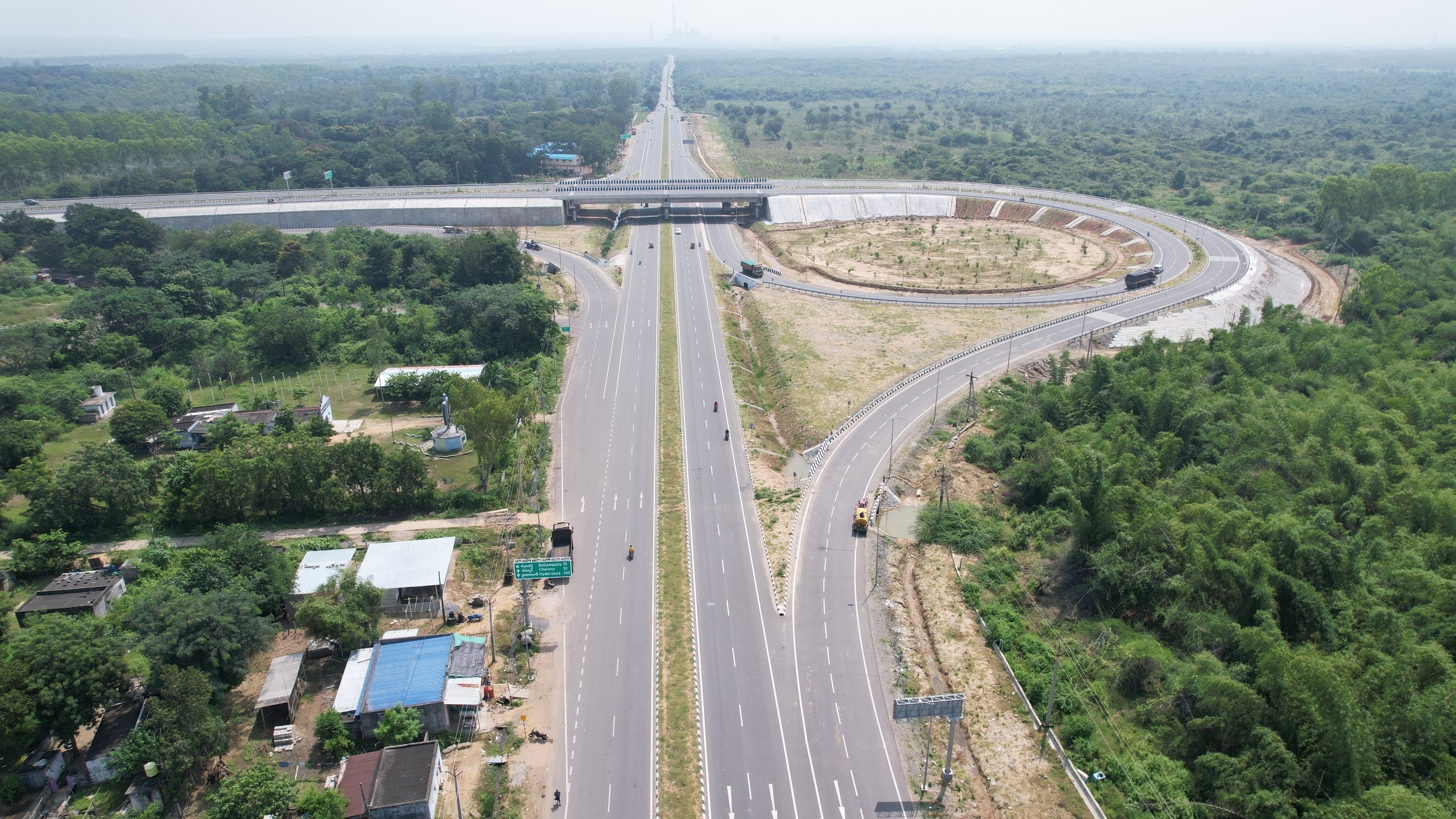
NH363 Mncl Interchange

Terminal near Mancherial.

== See also ==
- List of national highways in India
- List of national highways in India by state

== Notes ==
- In first notification for S.N. 194A, route Sironcha to Atmakur was named as NH 363. This has been replaced as NH 353C with extended route from Sakoli.
