= Dandepalle =

Dandepalle or Dandepally may refer to:

- Dandepalle, Hanamkonda district, a village in Telangana, India
- Dandepalle, Mancherial district, a village in Telangana, India
- Dandepalle mandal, a subdivision of Mancherial district
