= Naspur =

Naspur CCC
- Town
- Location in Telangana, India Naspur (India)
- Coordinates: 18.860402°N 79.484882°E
- Country: India
- State: Telangana
- District: Mancherial

Government
  - Type: Municipal council
  - Body: Naspur Municipality

Area
  - Total: 23.72 km^{2} (9.16 sq mi)
- Elevation: 134 m (440 ft)

Population (2011)
  - Total: 76,641
  - Rank: 57th in(Telangana)
  - Density: 3,231/km^{2} (8,368/sq mi)

Languages
  - Official: Telugu, Urdu
- Time zone: UTC+5:30 (IST)
- Postal code: 504302
- Vehicle registration: TG 19
- Website: naspurmunicipality.telangana.gov.in.

Naspur is a municipality and a suburb and mandal in Mancherial district of the Indian state of Telangana. Located the north bank of Godavari River.

Naspur Pin code is 504302 and postal head office is Coal Chemical Complex (also known as CCC).

Srirampur, Seetharampally, Thallapally, Srisri Nagar, Tilak Nagar are the nearby localities to Naspur.

Mancherial, Ramagundam, Mandamarri, Bellampalle are the nearby cities to Naspur.

== Administrative Divisions ==
Villages in Naspur Mandal.

Sl.No.	Name of the Mandal	Villages in the Mandal	Name of the Erstwhile Mandals from which the present Mandal is formed
1	Naspur (New)	Naspur	Mancherial
2	Naspur (New)	Singapur	Mancherial
3	Naspur (New)	Teegalpahad	Mancherial
4	Naspur (New)	Thallapally	Mancherial
5	Naspur (New)	Seetarampally	Mancherial

== Geography ==
Naspur is located at 18.83°N 79.45°E. It has an average elevation of 134 metres (439 feet). Total area is 23.72 km^{2}.

=== Sub Localities in Naspur ===
A-Sector

Village Naspur

Asr Nagar

Maszeed wada

Patel colony

FCI Colony

Housing board colony

Flood Colony

Nagarjuna Nagar Colony

Naspur Colony

Shirkey Colony

R&R Thallapally flats

C2 Quarters

Laxmi Nagar

Teachers Colony

Jagadhamba colony

Retired colony

Adarshnagar

RK 5 Colony

Sundarayya colony

Vidyanagar

== Demographics ==
As of 2011 India census, Naspur had a population of 73,616. Males constitute 51.97% of the population and females 48.02%. Naspur has an average literacy rate of 74.32%, male literacy is 82.11%, and female literacy is 66.18%. In Naspur, 7.07% of the population is under 6 years of age.

== Economy ==
A suburb of Mancherial Town, this town is largely inhabited by coalminers working in the Singareni Collieries company Ltd., The Coal Chemical Complex(C.C.C) of these collieries is located here.
