= Mancherial railway station =

Railway station in India

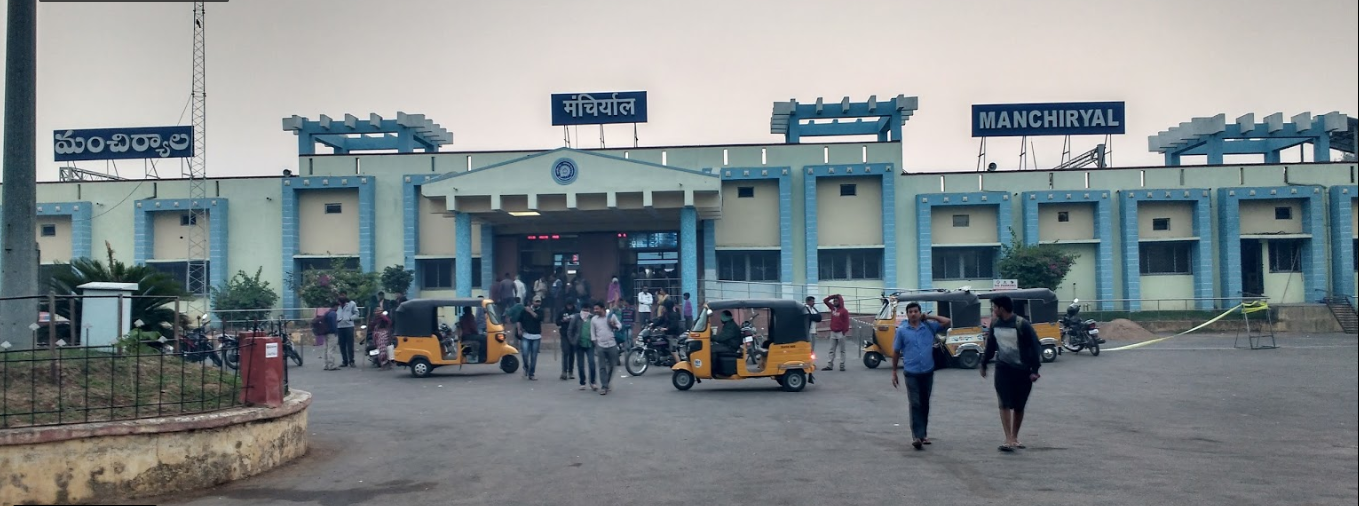

General information
- Location: Mancherial, India
- Coordinates: 18.879°N 79.449°E
- Platforms: 3
- Tracks: 7

Construction
- Parking: Available (charges apply)

Other information
- Status: Active
- Station code: MCI
- Fare zone: South Central Railway (SCR)
Location
- Location within Telangana Location within India

Manchiryal is a non-suburban (NSG–3) category Indian railway station in Secunderabad railway division of South Central Railway zone. It is located in Mancherial of the Indian state of Telangana. It was selected as one of the 21 stations to be developed under Amrit Bharat Stations scheme.

== History ==
Mancherial is located on the longest railway line, which is called the Grand Trunk line (New Delhi–Chennai). It is well connected by rail from various towns/cities in India. It comes under South Central Railways. With the completion of the Kazipet–Balharshah link in 1929, Chennai was directly linked to Delhi. It has 3 platforms. It is a good potential station to stop due its population as well as proximity to other major towns like Mandamarri (14 km), Luxettipet (26 km), Ramakrishnapur (8 km), Chennur (40 km), Jaipur Power Plant (17 km).

== Geography ==
Mancherial railway station is located on the Grand Trunk line. Nearest junctions are Peddapalli Junction, Kazipet Junction, Ballarshah Junction.

== Train frequency ==
Nearly 33 Trains will Halt at Mancherial railway station. And major station in this district.

== Facilities ==
As part of the Station Redevelopment Project, Indian Railways has upgraded the Mancherial railway station with many passenger-friendly facilities.The general waiting hall, ladies' waiting hall, as well as the upper-class waiting hall present on the east side of the station have been modernized and widened as part of the redevelopment project.

== Electrification ==
The Balharshah–Ramagundam sector in 1987–88 was electrified. This station is famous for MGR (Merry go round) system i.e., goods or coal carriage trains continuously runs and overhauls at this station.

== Developments ==
A new 201.04 kilometres (124.92 mi) railway line has been approved by the Cabinet Committee on Economic Affairs between Balharshah and Kazipet on 26 August 2016. The new line is extremely useful from goods loading point of view with FCI at Jammikunta, Kesoram Cement at Raghavapuram, Thermal Power Stations and SCCL at Ramagundam in Telangana, and Cement Chandrapur in Maharashtra. This will facilitate both the passenger traffic and goods movement that include cement, coal and food.
