= Tekumatla, Mancherial district =

Tekumatla
- Village
- Country: India
- State: Telangana
- District: Mancherial

Government
  - Type: Gram panchayat
- Elevation: 159 m (522 ft)

Languages
  - Official: Telugu
- Time zone: UTC+5:30 (IST)
- PIN: 504216
- Area code: 08736

Tekumatla is a village in Mancherial district of the Indian state of Telangana. It is located in Jaipur mandal.

Tekumatla has approximately 3,000 people and has a primary school.
