= Gandhari khilla =

Gandhari Khilla
- గాంధారి ఖిల్లా (Telugu)
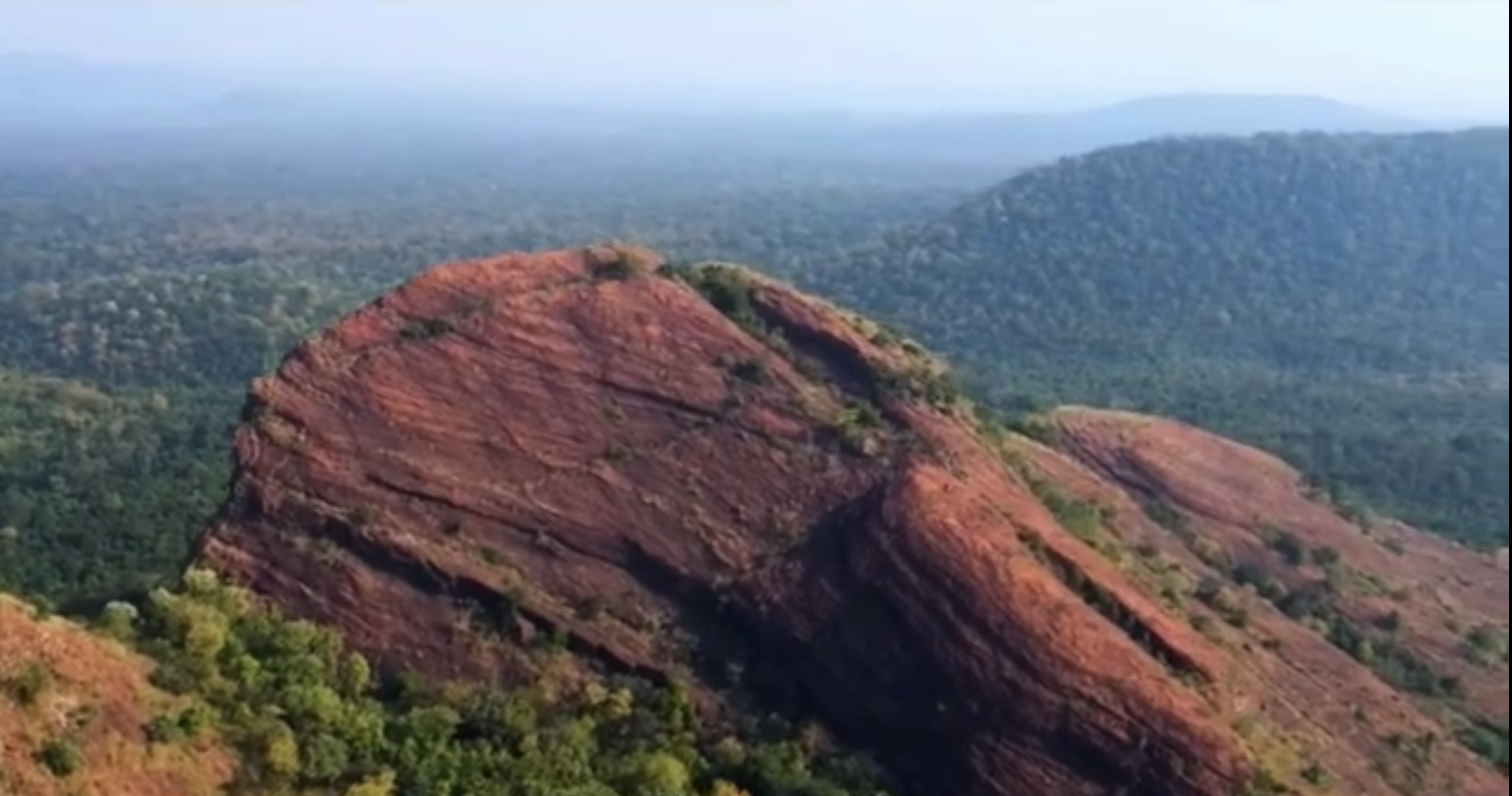
- Gandhari Khilla aerial view

- Location in Telangana Location in India
- 18.9503°N 79.4148°E
- Location: Bokkalagutta village, Mandamarri mandal, Mancherial district, Telangana, India

History
- Founded: Gondu tribals, Rashtrakutas, Kakatiya dynasty
- Built: 12th century

Gandhari khilla is a hill fort located near Bokkalagutta, in Mandamarri Mandal in Mancherial district in the Indian state of Telangana. It is located on the sand rock hills. It is 270 kilometres (157 mi) north east of the state capital, Hyderabad. The fort was built within a thickly forested area which has a wealth of plant species which includes many medicinal herbs. The fort has not been fully excavated and is still partially covered by forest. Mahankali Jatara (quarry jatara) is conducted every year which attracts more than 10,000 people. Gandhari maisamma jatra is done in the temple on the fort of Gandhari for every 2 years and tribal people from Vindhya region i.e maharastra, Chattisghad on the other bankside joins it. The Mancherial – Chandrapur - Nagpur NH 363 passes close to the fort, which is 3 kilometres away from the Bokkalaguttta village.

Gandhari Maisamma temple is located at the fort.

== History ==
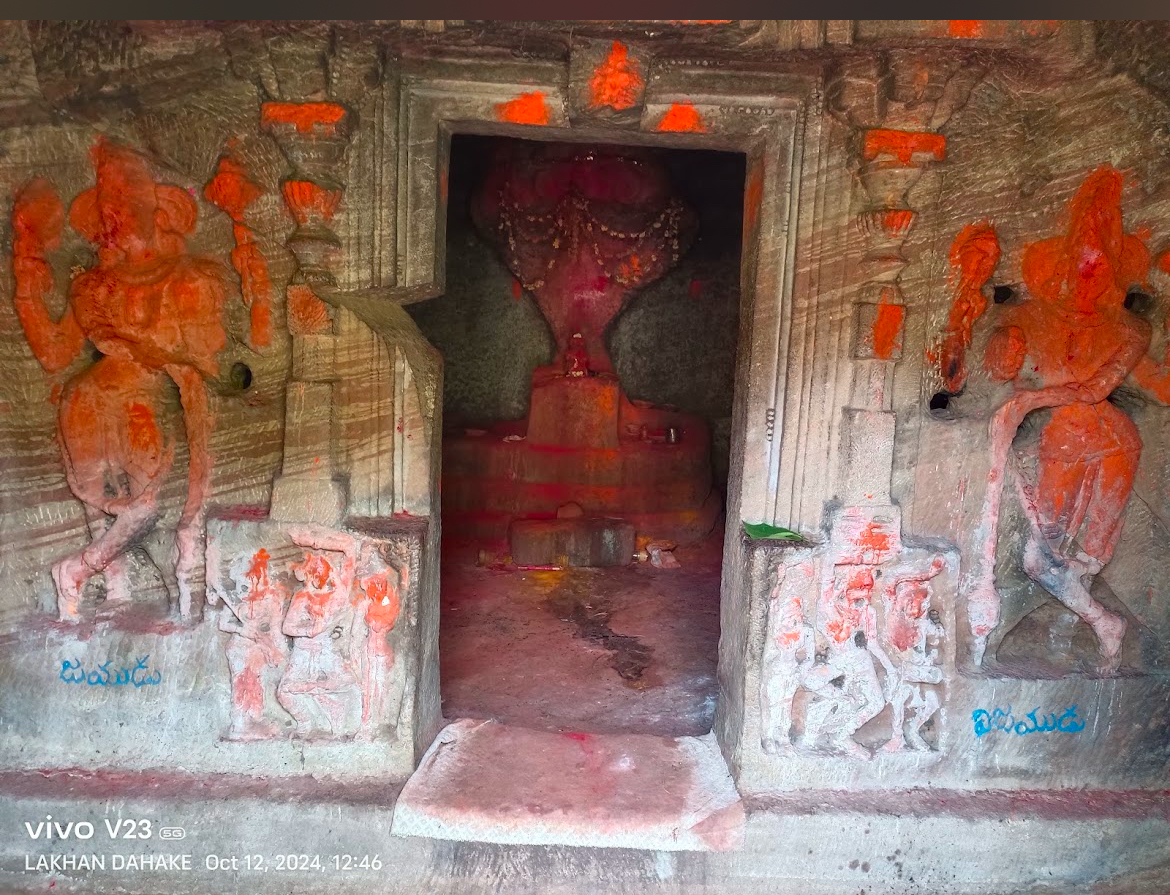
Temple built during the rule of Gond kings in Gandhari Khilla

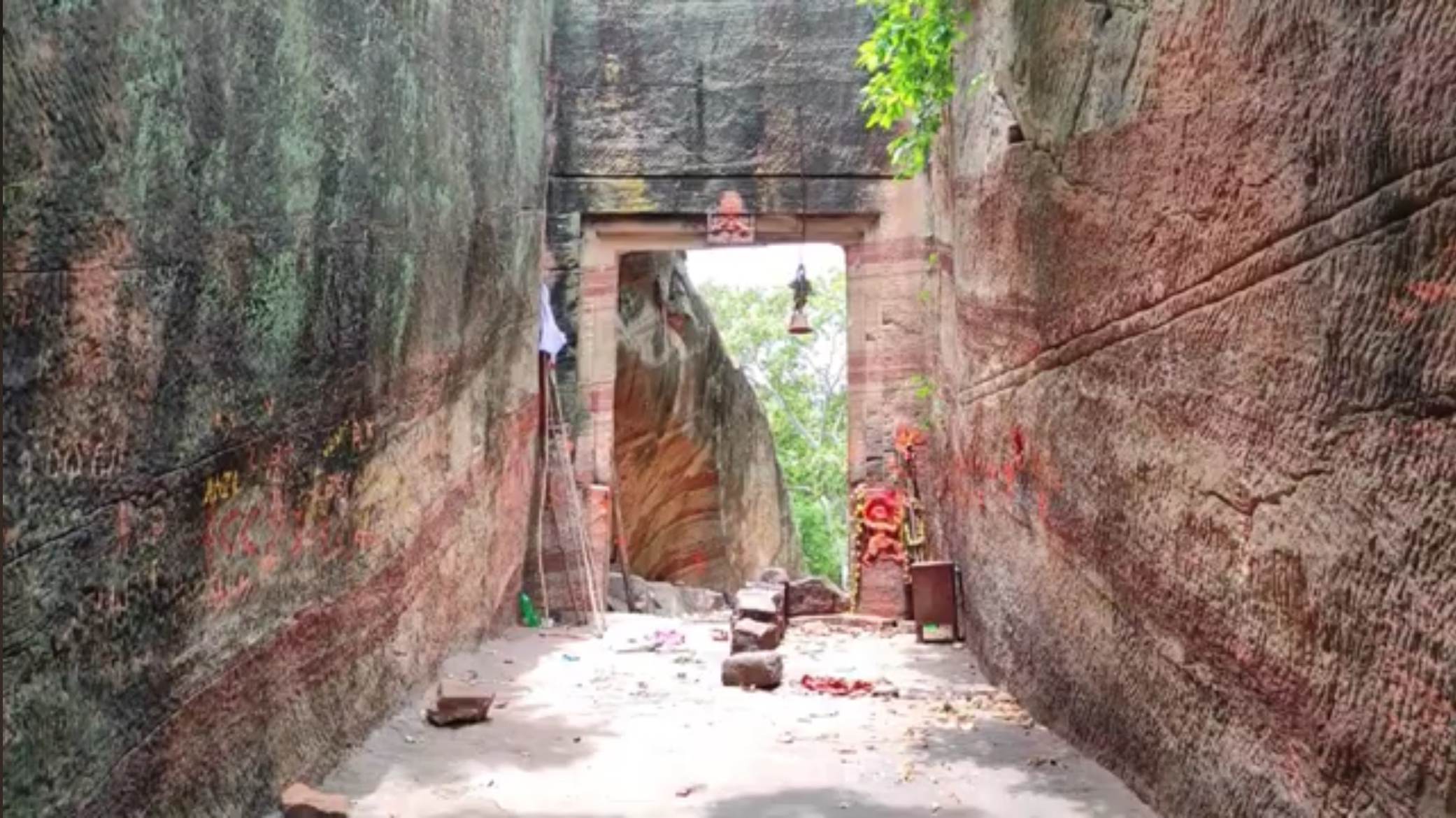
Entrance Way of Gandhari Khilla

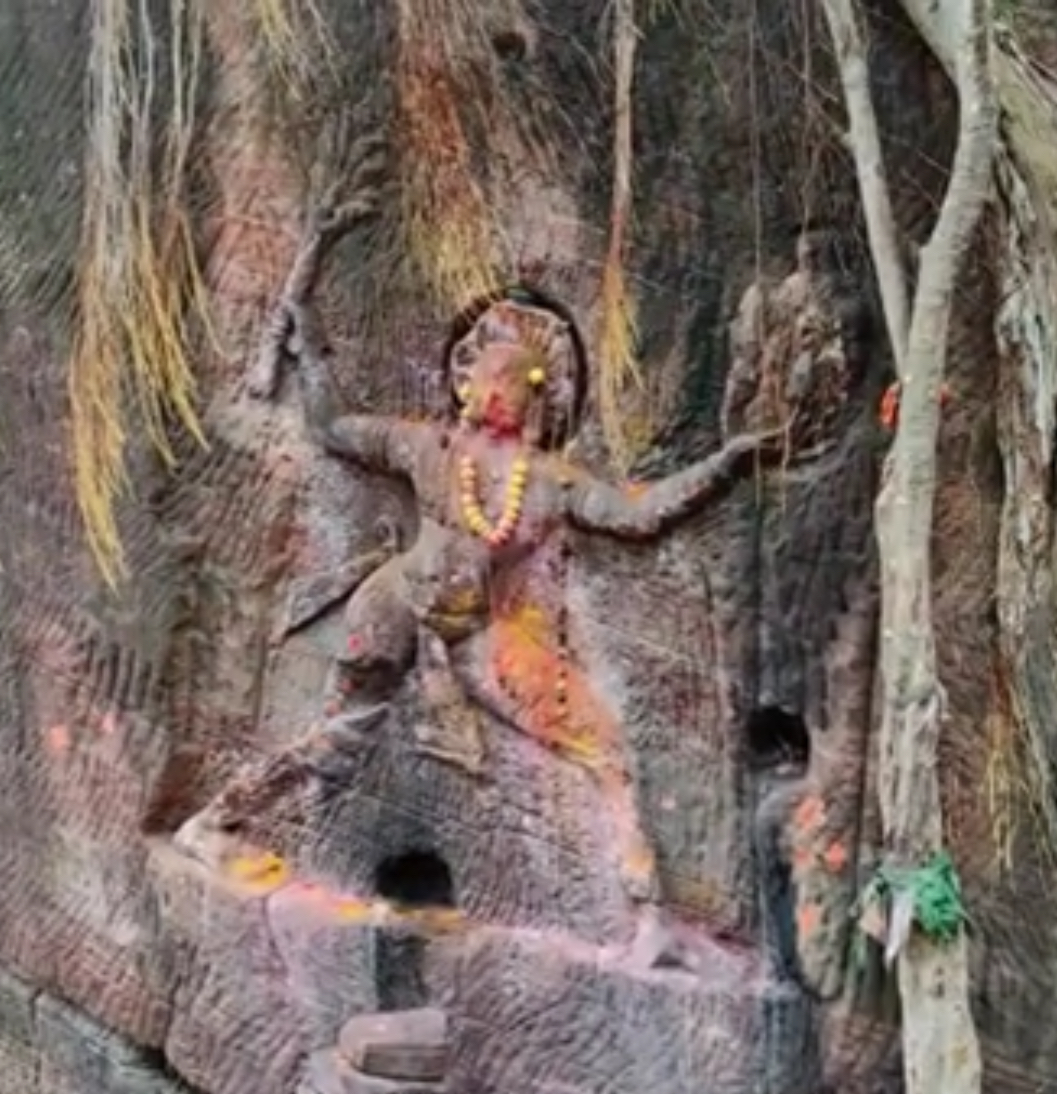
View of a stone sculpture in Gandhari Khilla

The fort was built in the 12th century by the Gondu tribals with the help of the Kakatiya Kings of Warangal. Archaeological work suggests that construction of the fort was begun early as the Rastrakuta era (prior to 1200 A.D.) and continued until the 16th century.

== Herbal plants ==
The forest in the area of the Gandhari fort is an important source for medicinal plants. Large numbers of local medicinal people collect the plants and offer them for sale in nearby towns. Students also visit the area to identify these plants and make herbarium specimens. In view of this importance for medicinal plants, it has been suggested that the forest of the fort area be declared a Medicinal Plants Conservation Center.
