= Perkapally =

Village in Telangana, India

Perkapally, formally known as Kodipunjulapalle is a village in Bellampally Mandal, Mancherial district in Telangana state. It has pleasant weather with green fields around it.

== Demographics ==
The population of this village is approximately 3000 with 1200 voters. 90% of the village population belongs to the Perika (Puragiri Kshatriya) community. The rest are barbers, washermen, potmakers, and harijans.

The main occupation of the people is agriculture. There are many students, doctors and engineers as well in the village. Most of the villagers' occupation is being employees of Singareni Colleries Company Ltd.

== Government ==
Mr. Durgam Rajeshwar is elected sarpanch in 2014 local elections. This village comes under Batwanpally Mandal Parishath Territorial Constituency. Currently, Mrs. Motapalukula Manjula Rajashekhar is representing as MPTC member in Bellampally Mandal Parishath.MIS. Ramagouni Padmavathi w/ Venkateswara goud is elected sarpanch in 2019 local elections. This village comes under Batwanpally Mandal Parishath Territorial Constituency. Currently, Mrs. Gumasa Srinivas is representing as MPTC member in Bellampally Mandal Parishath. and Bellampalli MPP Elected Gumasa Srinivas 2019
