= Jannaram mandal =

Jannaram
- Mandal
- Ponkal - Jannaram
- Location in Telangana, India Jannaram (India)
- Coordinates: 19.1188949°N 78.9989734°E
- Country: India
- State: Telangana

Government
  - Body: Grama Panchayat

Population
  - Total: 25,000

Languages
  - Official: Telugu
- Time zone: UTC+5:30 (IST)
- Postal code: 504205
- Area code: 08739
- Vehicle registration: TS
- Nearest city: Mancherial
- Lok Sabha constituency: Adilabad
- Vidhan Sabha constituency: Khanapur
- Civic agency: Grama Panchayat
- Website: www.jannaram.com

Jannaram Mandal is situated in Mancherial District of the Telangana state in South India. Jannaram is famous for Kawal Wildelife Sanctuary Tiger Reserve.

== History ==
Jannaram became mandal with effect from 22 May 1985. Before which it was in the Luxettipet Taluka.

== Administrative divisions ==
There are 27 villages under this madal.

Sl.No	Villages in the Mandal
1	Indhanpalle
2	Mahammadabad
3	Kawal
4	Kishtapur
5	Kamanpalle
6	Raindlaguda
7	Morrigudem
8	Murimadugu
9	Venkatapur
10	Narsingapur
11	Kalamadugu
12	Dharmaram
13	Badampalle
14	Puttiguda
15	Ponakal
16	Jannaram
17	Paidpalle
18	Dongapalle
19	Bommena
20	Papammaguda
21	Chintaguda
22	Malyal
23	Singaraipet
24	Thimmapur
25	Rampur
26	Juvviguda
27	Kothapet
