= Vemanpalle mandal =

Coordinates: 18°58′54″N 79°52′18″E

Vemanapally is a Mandal in Mancherial district in the state of Telangana, in south India.

== Administrative Division ==
There are 30 Villages in Vemanpally.

Sl.No.	Name of the Mandal	Villages in the Mandal	Name of the Erstwhile Mandals from which the present Mandal is formed
1	Vemanpalli	Buyyaram	Vemanpalli
2	Vemanpalli	Jilleda	Vemanpalli
3	Vemanpalli	Jakkepally	Vemanpalli
4	Vemanpalli	Maddulapally (UI)	Vemanpalli
5	Vemanpalli	Upparlapahad (UI)	Vemanpalli
6	Vemanpalli	Nagaram	Vemanpalli
7	Vemanpalli	Suraram	Vemanpalli
8	Vemanpalli	Bommena	Vemanpalli
9	Vemanpalli	Chamanpally	Vemanpalli
10	Vemanpalli	Baddampally	Vemanpalli
11	Vemanpalli	Gudepalli(UI)	Vemanpalli
12	Vemanpalli	Dasnapur	Vemanpalli
13	Vemanpalli	Kothapally	Vemanpalli
14	Vemanpalli	Vemanpally	Vemanpalli
15	Vemanpalli	Rajaram	Vemanpalli
16	Vemanpalli	Godampet(UI)	Vemanpalli
17	Vemanpalli	Oddugudem	Vemanpalli
18	Vemanpalli	Sumptam	Vemanpalli
19	Vemanpalli	Jajulpet	Vemanpalli
20	Vemanpalli	Mukkidigudem	Vemanpalli
21	Vemanpalli	Kallampally	Vemanpalli
22	Vemanpalli	Kalmalpet(UI)	Vemanpalli
23	Vemanpalli	Gorlapally	Vemanpalli
24	Vemanpalli	Katepalli(UI)	Vemanpalli
25	Vemanpalli	Mamda	Vemanpalli
26	Vemanpalli	Neelwai	Vemanpalli
27	Vemanpalli	Kyathanpally	Vemanpalli
28	Vemanpalli	Badvelli (UI)	Vemanpalli
29	Vemanpalli	Mulkalpet	Vemanpalli
30	Vemanpalli	Racharla	Vemanpalli
