= Bheemini mandal =

Bheemini
- Mandal
- Location in Telangana, India Bheemini (India)
- Coordinates: 19°08′38″N 79°43′00″E
- Country: India
- State: Telangana
- District: Mancherial
- Time zone: UTC+5:30 (IST)
- Vehicle registration: TS
- Website: telangana.gov.in

Bheemini is a mandal in Mancherial district in the state of Telangana in India.

== Administrative divisions ==
There are 21 villages in Bheemini.

Sl.no.	Name of the mandal	Villages in the mandal	Name of the erstwhile mandals from which the present mandal is formed
1	Bheemini	Karjibheempur	Bheemini
2	Bheemini	Pothepalli (D)	Bheemini
3	Bheemini	Kamalapur (D)	Bheemini
4	Bheemini	Akkalapalle	Bheemini
5	Bheemini	Ramaraopet (D)	Bheemini
6	Bheemini	Laxmipur	Bheemini
7	Bheemini	Wadal	Bheemini
8	Bheemini	Peddagudipet	Bheemini
9	Bheemini	Rajaram	Bheemini
10	Bheemini	Peddapeta	Bheemini
11	Bheemini	Bhimini	Bheemini
12	Bheemini	Venkatapur	Bheemini
13	Bheemini	Veegaon	Bheemini
14	Bheemini	Bitturpalle	Bheemini
15	Bheemini	Mallidi	Bheemini
16	Bheemini	Dampur	Bheemini
17	Bheemini	Pedda Thimmapur	Dahegaon
18	Bheemini	Chinnathimmapur	Dahegaon
19	Bheemini	Keslapur	Dahegaon
20	Bheemini	Chinna Gudipet	Dahegaon
21	Bheemini	Thangallapalli	Dahegaon
