= Kawal Wildlife Sanctuary =

Wildlife sanctuary in India

- IUCN category IV (habitat/species management area)
- Location within Telangana Location within India
- Interactive map of Kawal Wildlife Sanctuary
- Location: Mancherial district, Telangana
- Coordinates: 19.1188949°N 78.9989734°E
- Area: 2,015.44 km^{2} (778.17 sq mi)
- Established: 2012

Kawal Wildlife Sanctuary is a wildlife sanctuary in Jannaram mandal of Mancherial District in the Telangana state of India. The Government of India declared it as a tiger reserve in 2012. It is a catchment for the Godavari and Kadam rivers, which flow towards the south of the sanctuary.

== History ==
Kawal Wildlife Sanctuary was established in 1965. It was listed as a tiger reserve in April 2012.

== Geography ==
Kawal Wildlife Sanctuary is located in Mancherial district and surrounded by Adilabad district and Komaram Bheem Asifabad district on the north, Jagtial district and Peddapalli district on the south and Nirmal district on the west. It extends from the Sahayadri Hills to Tadoba Andhari Tiger Reserve in Maharashtra. It covers an area of 893 km^{2} (345 sq mi).

== Wildlife ==
=== Flora ===
The sanctuary is one of the richest teak forests in the state, with dense pristine areas free of human disturbance. The River Godavari flows through this area. Dry deciduous teak forests mixed with bamboo, terminalia, pterocarpus, anogeissus and cassias.

=== Fauna ===
Mammal species that have been sighted include tiger, leopard, gaur, cheetal, sambar, nilgai, barking deer, chowsingha, and sloth bear. Several species of birds and reptiles are also found in the sanctuary.

About 48 tigers are currently staying at the sanctuary, according to unofficial government sources, a number which the government hopes will increase over time.

== Threats ==
It is increasingly getting threatened by growing human encroachment, rampant poaching, illegal wood felling and habitat loss.
