= Kannepally =

- Village and Mandal
- Location in Telangana, India Kannepally (India)
- Coordinates: 19°08′38″N 79°43′00″E
- Country: India
- State: Telangana
- District: Mancherial
- Time zone: UTC+5:30 (IST)
- Vehicle registration: TS
- Website: telangana.gov.in

Kannepally is a village and new mandal of Mancherial district in Telangana state of India.

== Administrative divisions ==
There are 24 Villages in Kannepally.

Sl.No.	Name of the Mandal	Villages in the Mandal	Name of the Erstwhile Mandals from which the present Mandal is formed
1	Kannepalli (New)	Metpalle	Bheemini
2	Kannepalli (New)	Kannepalle	Bheemini
3	Kannepalli (New)	Surjapur	Bheemini
4	Kannepalli (New)	Babapur	Bheemini
5	Kannepalli (New)	Lingapur	Bheemini
6	Kannepalli (New)	Gollaghat	Bheemini
7	Kannepalli (New)	Polampalle	Bheemini
8	Kannepalli (New)	Shiknam	Bheemini
9	Kannepalli (New)	Jajjarvelly	Bheemini
10	Kannepalli (New)	Kothapalle	Bheemini
11	Kannepalli (New)	Rebbena	Bheemini
12	Kannepalli (New)	Veerapur	Bheemini
13	Kannepalli (New)	Tekulapalle	Bheemini
14	Kannepalli (New)	Jankapur	Bheemini
15	Kannepalli (New)	Yellaram	Bheemini
16	Kannepalli (New)	Muthapur	Bheemini
17	Kannepalli (New)	Dampur	Bheemini
18	Kannepalli (New)	Mothkupalli (D)	Bheemini
19	Kannepalli (New)	Ankannapet (D)	Bheemini
20	Kannepalli (New)	Salegaon	Dahegaon
21	Kannepalli (New)	Madavelli	Dahegaon
22	Kannepalli (New)	Nagapelli	Vemanpalli
23	Kannepalli (New)	Lingala	Vemanpalli
24	Kannepalli (New)	Chinthapudi	Vemanpalli

Total 24 Mandalams
