= Gudem Gutta Shree Satyanarayana Swamy Temple =

- గూడెం గుట్ట శ్రీ సత్యనారాయణ స్వామి దేవాలయం
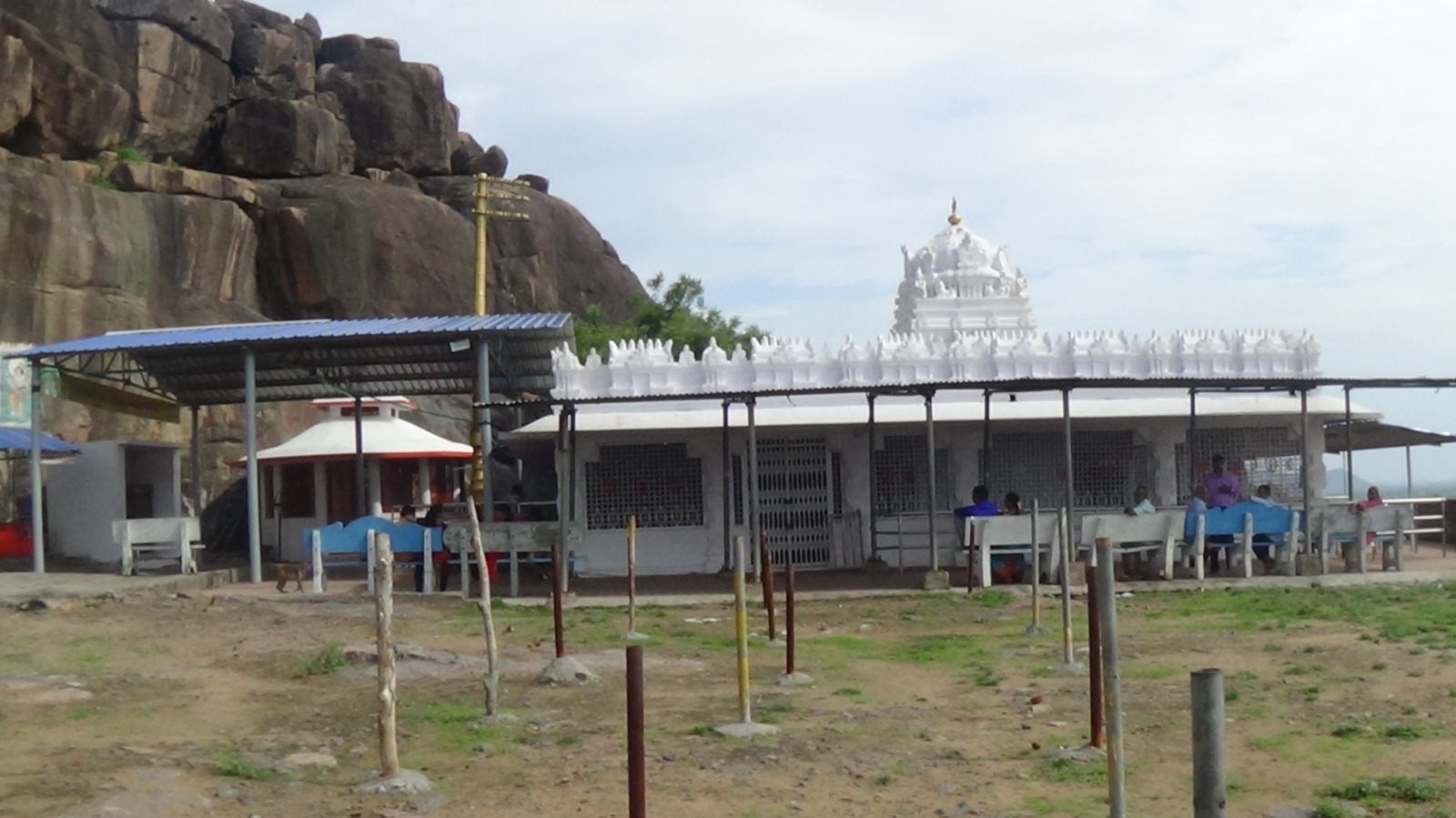
- Gudem Gutta Shree Satyanarayana Swamy Temple

- Location in Telangana

Religion
- Affiliation: Hinduism
- District: Mancherial
- Deity: Lord Shree Satyanarayana Swamy

Location
- State: Telangana
- Country: India
- Interactive map of Gudem Gutta Shree Satyanarayana Swamy Temple
- Coordinates: 18.905898591918866°N 79.17227989661839°E

Architecture
- Founder: Govardhana Perugia
- Established: 1964; 62 years ago

The Gudem Gutta Shree Satyanarayana Swamy Temple is a Hindu temple, located on a hill (gutta) in Gudem Village, part of Dandepalle, Mancherial district, on the banks of the holy river Godavari. It is dedicated to Lord Vishnu, "God of truth" (Shree Satyanarayana Swamy).

It is also called as "Telangana's Annavaram" as Annavaram of Andhra Pradesh state which is famous for Shree Satyanarayana Swamy Temple. Gudem Gutta Shree Satyanarayana Swamy Temple is one of the most famous temples of Telangana State.

== History ==
The hill was used to be called as "Ratnadri hill". In 1964, Shree Satyanarayana Swamy (Lord Vishnu) appeared in the dream of a devotee called Govardhana Perumandla Swamy of Gudem village and said that he was on the Ratnapu Chevula hill. He went on to that hill and he found the idols of Shree Satyanarayana Swamy and the idols were anointed with the waters of the holy Godavari River. Locals say that then the temple was built. The temple was built on the day Shukla (or Shuddha) Dashami in the month Magha of year Krodhi (one of the Hindu years called Samvatsara).

== Festivals ==
For every year on Karthika Pournami, Jatara is held at the temple. As part of this horoscope, the temple organizers perform Satyanarayana Swamy Vratam.

For every 12 years, Godavari Pushkaralu is held in the holy Godavari River whose banks are situated near Gudem Gutta Shree Satyanarayana Swamy Temple.

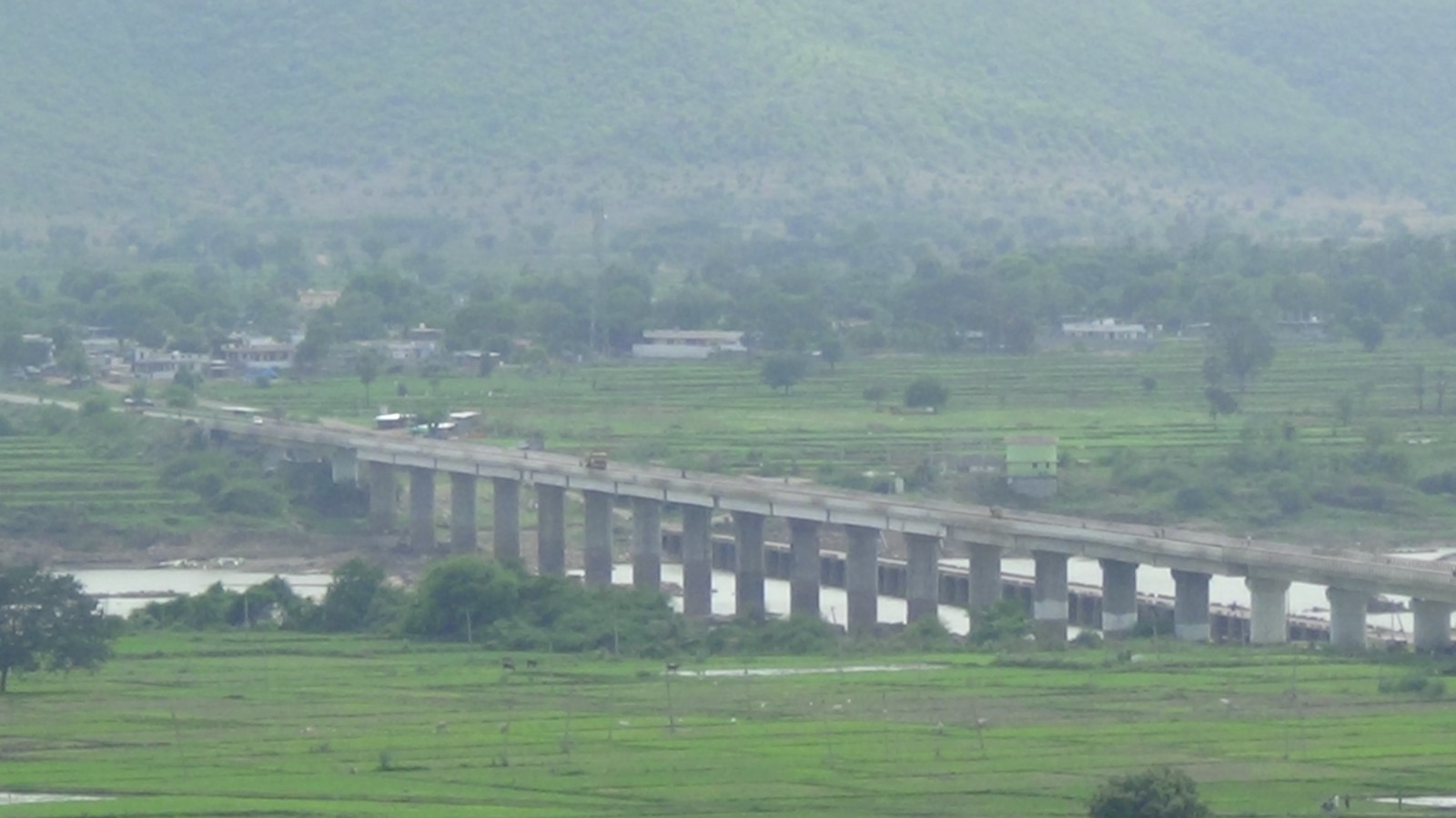
View of Rayapatnam Bridge (NH-63) over Godavari River from Gudem Gutta

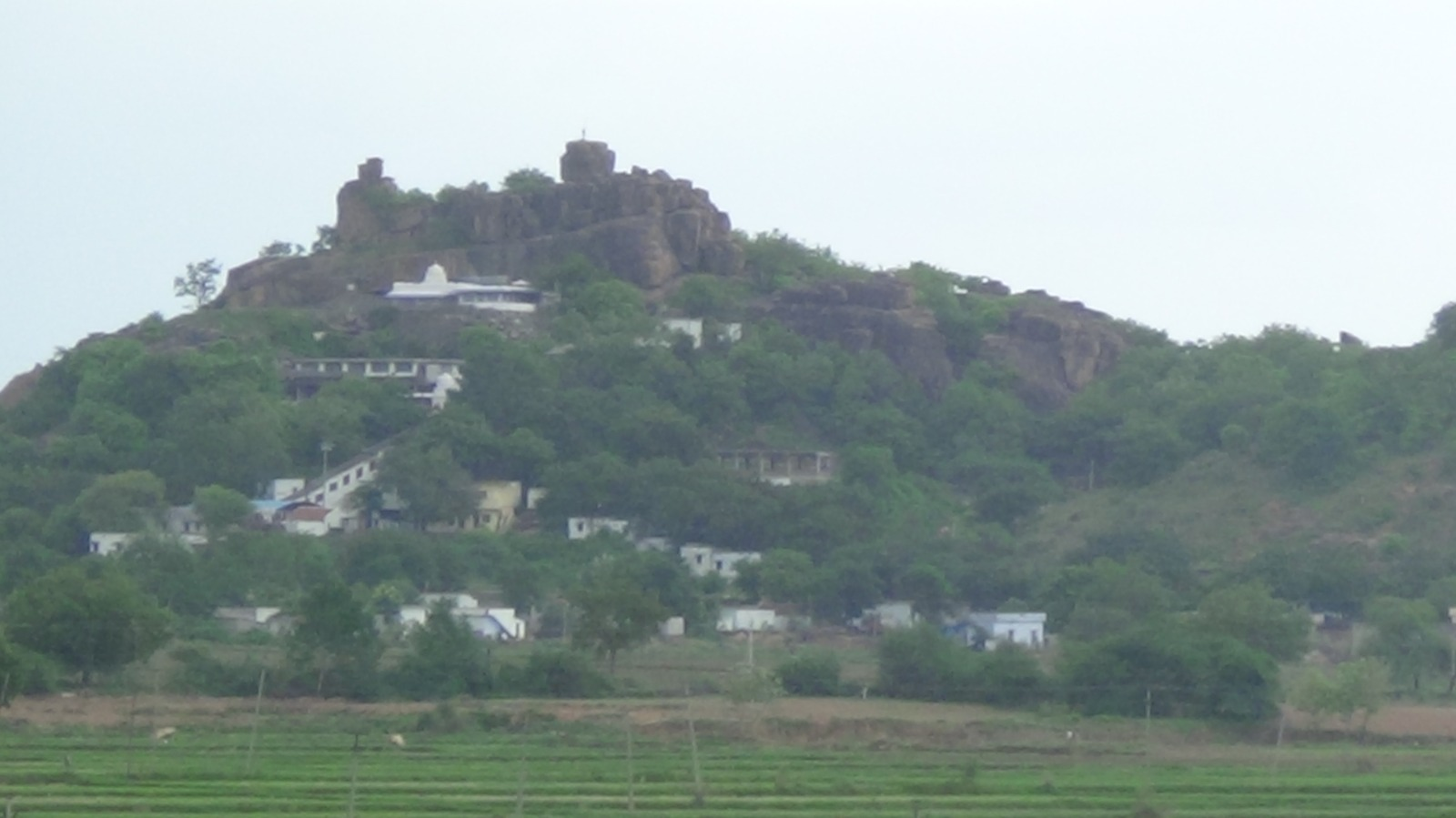
Gudem Gutta near National Highway-63
