= Bheemaram =

- Village and Mandal
- Location in Telangana, India Bheemaram (India)
- Coordinates: 18.8490001°N 79.5755196°E
- Country: India
- State: Telangana
- District: Mancherial

Languages
  - Official: Telugu
- Time zone: UTC+5:30 (IST)
- PIN: 504204
- Vehicle registration: TS
- Website: telangana.gov.in

Bheemaram is a village and mandal of the Mancherial District of Telangana State. It is previously under the jaipur Mandal, but after new district formation in Telangana State, this was declared as a new mandal for the Mancherial District.

== Administrative divisions ==
There are 12 Villages in this Mandal.

Sl.No.	Name of the Mandal	Villages in the Mandal	Name of the Erstwhile Mandals from which the present Mandal is formed
1	Bheemaram(New)	khazipally	Dharmaram
2	Bheemaram(New)	Dampur	Dharmaram
3	Bheemaram(New)	Burugupalle	Dharmaram
4	Bheemaram(New)	Pothanpalle	Dharmaram
5	Bheemaram(New)	Bheemaram	Dharmaram
6	Bheemaram(New)	Ankushapur	Dharmaram
7	Bheemaram(New)	Polampalle	Dharmaram
8	Bheemaram(New)	Arepalle	Dharmaram
9	Bheemaram(New)	Maddikal	Dharmaram
10	Bheemaram(New)	Kothapalle	Dharmaram
11	Bheemaram(New)	Vellapelly (D)	Dharmaram
12	Bheemaram(New)	Arkepelly (D)	Dharmaram
