= Shivaram Wildlife Sanctuary =

Wildlife preserve in Telangana, India

Coordinates: 18.705°N 79.697°E

- IUCN category IV (habitat/species management area)
- Interactive map of Shivaram Wildlife Sanctuary
- Location: Adilabad and Karimnagar districts
- Area: 29.81 km^{2} (11.51 sq mi)
- Established: 1978

Shivaram Wildlife Sanctuary is a wildlife preserve in India located in Mancherial district of Telangana and is located 10 km from Manthani, 40 km from Peddapalli, 80 km from Karimnagar and 30 km from Godavarikhani. This riverine forest mixed with teak and terminalia is spread over 36.29 square kilometres (14.01 sq mi) and is home to marsh crocodiles from the river Godavari. It also harbours Indian leopards, sloth bears, nilgai, blackbucks, chitals, pythons, and langurs. The undulating natural terrain adds to the beauty of the sanctuary. It also has bird species like parrots, peacocks, harpy eagles, vultures, and the pretty macaws
