= Bellampally railway station =

Railway station in India

Bellampally Bellampalli

General information
- Other names: Bellampalle
- Location: Mancheriyal Road, Bellampalli, Mancherial district, Telangana; India
- Coordinates: 19.052677°N 79.4837454°E
- Elevation: 204 metres above sea level
- System: Indian Railways station
- Owner: Indian Railways
- Operator: South Central Railway zone
- Line: Nagpur–Hyderabad line

Construction
- Structure type: At–grade

Other information
- Status: Functioning
- Station code: BPA
- Zone(s): South Central Railway zone
- Division(s): Secunderabad
- Fare zone: Indian Railways

History
- Rebuilt: 2019

Passengers
- 4,200 per day (2019)
Location
- Location within India Location within Telangana

Bellampally, also spelled Bellampalli, (Code: BPA) is a railway station in the town Bellampalle, located in Mancherial district Telangana and falls under the Secunderabad railway division of the South Central Railway Zone of the Indian Railways. The station is categorized as a Non Suburban Grade- 5 (NSG- 5) station.

== Geography ==
Bellampalli railway station is located on the Grand Trunk line. Nearest junctions are Peddapalli Junction, Kazipet Junction, Ballarshah Junction.

== History ==
Bellampalli is located on the longest railway line, which is called the Grand Trunk line (New Delhi–Chennai). It is well connected by rail from various towns/cities in India. It comes under South Central Railways. With the completion of the Kazipet–Balharshah link in 1929, Chennai was directly linked to Delhi. It has 3 platforms.

== Train frequency ==
Nearly 67 Trains will Halt at Bellampally railway station.

== Electrification ==
The Balharshah–Ramagundam sector in 1987–88 was electrified. This station is famous for MGR (Merry go round) system i.e., goods or coal carriage trains continuously runs and overhauls at this station.

== Facilities ==
As part of the Station Redevelopment Project, Indian Railways has upgraded the Bellampalli railway station with many passenger-friendly facilities.The general waiting hall, ladies' waiting hall, as well as the upper-class waiting hall present on the east side of the station have been modernized and widened as part of the redevelopment project.

== Developments ==
A new 201.04 kilometres (124.92 mi) railway line has been approved by the Cabinet Committee on Economic Affairs between Balharshah and Kazipet on August 26, 2016. The new line is extremely useful from goods loading point of view with FCI at Jammikunta, Kesoram Cement at Raghavapuram, Thermal Power Stations and SCCL at Ramagundam in Telangana, and Cement Chandrapur in Maharashtra. This will facilitate both the passenger traffic and goods movement that include cement, coal and food.
