= Kotapally mandal =

Kotapally
- Mandal
- Location in Telangana, India Kotapally (India)
- Country: India
- State: Telangana
- District: Mancherial
- Time zone: UTC+5:30 (IST)
- Vehicle registration: TS

Kotapally, is a Mandal located in Mancherial district in Telangana state of India.

== Administrative Division ==
There are 34 Villages in the Kotapally.

Sl.No.	Name of the Mandal	Villages in the Mandal	Name of the Erstwhile Mandals from which the present Mandal is formed
1	Kotapally	Nakkalpalle	Kotapally
2	Kotapally	Brahmanpalle	Kotapally
3	Kotapally	Mallampet	Kotapally
4	Kotapally	Shankarpur	Kotapally
5	Kotapally	Shetpalle	Kotapally
6	Kotapally	Pangadisomaram	Kotapally
7	Kotapally	Kotapalle	Kotapally
8	Kotapally	Vesonvai	Kotapally
9	Kotapally	Sarvaipet	Kotapally
10	Kotapally	Kondampet	Kotapally
11	Kotapally	Nagampet	Kotapally
12	Kotapally	Bopparam	Kotapally
13	Kotapally	Venchapalle	Kotapally
14	Kotapally	Supak	Kotapally
15	Kotapally	Jangaon	Kotapally
16	Kotapally	Algaon	Kotapally
17	Kotapally	Pullagaon	Kotapally
18	Kotapally	Sirsa	Kotapally
19	Kotapally	Edula Bandam	Kotapally
20	Kotapally	Lingannapet	Kotapally
21	Kotapally	Edagatta	Kotapally
22	Kotapally	Pinnaram	Kotapally
23	Kotapally	Parpalle	Kotapally
24	Kotapally	Yerraipet	Kotapally
25	Kotapally	Borampalle	Kotapally
26	Kotapally	Kawarkothapalle	Kotapally
27	Kotapally	Annaram	Kotapally
28	Kotapally	Arjungutta	Kotapally
29	Kotapally	Rajaram	Kotapally
30	Kotapally	Rampur	Kotapally
31	Kotapally	Kollur	Kotapally
32	Kotapally	Rawalpalle	Kotapally
33	Kotapally	Dewalwada	Kotapally
34	Kotapally	Rapanpalle	Kotapally
