= Vemanpalle, Mancherial district =

Vemanpally
- Village
- Location in Telangana, India Vemanpally (India)
- Coordinates: 19.101063°N 79.8403716°E
- Country: India
- State: Telangana
- District: Mancherial

Languages
  - Official: Telugu
- Time zone: UTC+5:30 (IST)
- PIN: 504214

Vemanpalle is a village in Mancherial district of the Indian state of Telangana. It is located in Vemanpalle mandal of Mancherial revenue division.

== Geography ==
Vemanpally is located at 19.101063°N 79.8403716°E.
