= Jaipur, Mancherial district =

Jaipur
- Village and Mandal
- Location in Telangana, India Jaipur (India)
- Coordinates: 18.8490001°N 79.5755196°E
- Country: India
- State: Telangana
- District: Adilabad

Languages
  - Official: Telugu
- Time zone: UTC+5:30 (IST)
- PIN: 504216
- Vehicle registration: TS
- Website: telangana.gov.in

Jaipur is a village and a mandal (or tehsil) in the Mancherial district, the northernmost district in the state of Telangana in south India.

== Geography ==
Jaipur is located at 18.8490001°N 79.5755196°E.

== Demographics ==
As of 2011 Census of India, Jaipur had a population of 2492. The total population constitute, 1254 males and 1238 females with a sex ratio of 987 females per 1000 males. 190 children are in the age group of 0–6 years, with child sex ratio of 979 girls per 1000 boys. The average literacy rate stands at 65.73%.

== See also ==
- Mancherial district
- List of mandals in Telangana
