= Tandur mandal, Mancherial district =

Tandur
- Mandal
- Nickname: ib tandur
- Location in Telangana, India Tandur (India)
- Coordinates: 19.14927°N 79.4371273°E
- Country: India
- State: Telangana
- District: Mancherial

Area
  - Total: 33.81 km^{2} (13.05 sq mi)

Population (2011)
  - Total: 9,672
  - Density: 286.1/km^{2} (740.9/sq mi)

Languages
  - Official: Telugu
- Time zone: UTC+5:30 (IST)

Tandur is a mandal in Mancherial district of the Indian state of Telangana. It is located in Bellamaplly revenue division.

== Administrative divisions ==
There are 20 villages in Tandur.

Sl.No.	Name of the Mandal	Villages in the Mandal	Name of the Erstwhile Mandals from which the present Mandal is formed
1	Tandur	Abbapur	Tandur
2	Tandur	Narsapur	Tandur
3	Tandur	Madaram	Tandur
4	Tandur	Pegadapalle	Tandur
5	Tandur	Repallewada	Tandur
6	Tandur	Kothapalle	Tandur
7	Tandur	Balhanpur	Tandur
8	Tandur	Rechini	Tandur
9	Tandur	Annaram	Tandur
10	Tandur	Achalapur	Tandur
11	Tandur	Gampalpalle	Tandur
12	Tandur	Chandrapalle	Tandur
13	Tandur	Gopalnagar	Tandur
14	Tandur	Kistampet	Tandur
15	Tandur	Choutpalle	Tandur
16	Tandur	Boyapalle	Tandur
17	Tandur	Tandur	Tandur
18	Tandur	Dwarakapur	Tandur
19	Tandur	Kasipet	Tandur
20	Tandur	Katherla	Tandur

== Geography ==
Tandur is located at 18.9537668°N 77.9801393°E.
