= Wankidi =

Hyderabad
- Village
- Location in Telangana, India Hyderabad (India)
- Coordinates: 19.481768°N 79.3165056°E
- Country: India
- State: Telangana
- District: Komaram Bheem

Languages
  - Official: Telugu
- Time zone: UTC+5:30 (IST)
- PIN: 504295
- Vehicle registration: TG 20

Wankidi is a mandal headquarter in Komaram Bheem district of the Indian state of Telangana. It is located in of Asifabad, Telangana revenue division.

== Geography ==
Wankidi is located at 19.481768°N 79.3165056°E.
