= Chennur, Mancherial district =

Chennur
- Census Town
- Location in Telangana, India Chennur (India)
- Coordinates: 18.8535°N 79.7826°E
- Country: India
- State: Telangana
- District: Mancherial

Government
  - Type: Municipality
  - Body: Chennur Municipality
  - Municipal Chairman: Peddinti Padma (INC)
  - Vice-chairman: Nayakapu Vinay(INC)

Area
  - Total: 24.53 km^{2} (9.47 sq mi)

Population (2011)
  - Total: 23,579
  - Rank: 72nd (Telangana)
  - Density: 961.2/km^{2} (2,490/sq mi)

Languages
  - Official: Telugu
- Time zone: UTC+5:30 (IST)
- PIN: 504201
- Vehicle registration: TS01, TS19 (New)
- Website: chennurmunicipality.telangana.gov.in

Chennur is a census town located in Mancherial district of the Indian state of Telangana. The town is located on the banks of Godavari river. Generally Godavari flows from west to east but the Godavari river in Chennur flows towards the north for 5 Kosa (15 km) hence it is known as "Panchkosha Uttara Wahini". And It is a Municipal Council and the headquarters of Chennur mandal. The town is situated in Chennur mandal under Chennur revenue division and part of Chennur assembly constituency.

In October 2023, Chennur was constituted as a new revenue division in Mancherial district, Telangana.

== Civic administration ==
Chennur Municipality, Municipal Council Chennur (MCC) is the civic body that administers the city. it was constituted as a third grade municipality in the year 2018.

== Administrative divisions ==
Chennur Mandal has 30 villages.

Sl.No	Villages in the Mandal
1	Chennur
2	Buddaram
3	Sankaram
4	Kannepalle
5	Shivalingapur
6	Akkapalle
7	Chintapalle
8	Yellakkapet
9	Kistampet
10	Khambojipet
11	Lingampalle
12	Suddal
13	Bhamraopet
14	Kathersala
15	Narayanpur
16	Dugnepalle
17	Raipet
18	Angarajpalle
19	Kachanpalle
20	Gangaram
21	Asnad
22	Kommera
23	Sundersala
24	Narasakkapet
25	Pokkur
26	Chakepalle
27	Ponnaram
28	Somanpalle
29	Nagapur
30	Beervelli

== Transport ==
National Highway 63 passes through this town.
