= Kasipet =

- Census Town
- Location in Telangana, India Kasipet (India)
- Coordinates: 19.0333°N 79.4667°E
- Country: India
- State: Telangana
- District: Mancherial

Area
  - Total: 13.28 km^{2} (5.13 sq mi)

Population (2011)
  - Total: 5,133
  - Density: 386.5/km^{2} (1,001/sq mi)

Languages
  - Official: Telugu, Gond, English, Hindi, Marati
- Time zone: UTC+5:30 (IST)
- PIN: 504231
- Vehicle registration: TS
- Website: www.kasipetnews.com

Kasipet is a census town in Mancherial district of the Indian state of Telangana.

There are 22 Villages in Kasipet Mandal.

| Sl.No. | Name of the Mandal | Villages in the Mandal | Name of the Erstwhile Mandals from which the present Mandal is formed |
|---|---|---|---|
| 1 | Kasipet | Kasipet | Kasipet |
| 2 | Kasipet | Devapur | Kasipet |
| 3 | Kasipet | Dharmaraopet | Kasipet |
| 4 | Kasipet | Muthyampalli | Kasipet |
| 5 | Kasipet | Kondapur | Kasipet |
| 6 | Kasipet | Somagudem | Kasipet |
| 7 | Kasipet | Komatichenu | Kasipet |
| 8 | Kasipet | Peddanapalli | Kasipet |
| 9 | Kasipet | Konur | Kasipet |
| 10 | Kasipet | Pallamguda | Kasipet |
| 11 | Kasipet | Venkatapur | Kasipet |
| 12 | Kasipet | Sonapur | Kasipet |
| 13 | Kasipet | Mamidiguda | Kasipet |
| 14 | Kasipet | Lambadithanda | Kasipet |
| 15 | Kasipet | Malkepalli | Kasipet |
| 16 | Kasipet | Rottepalli | Kasipet |
| 17 | Kasipet | Gatraopalli | Kasipet |
| 18 | Kasipet | Thatiguda | Kasipet |
| 19 | Kasipet | Maddimada | Kasipet |
| 20 | Kasipet | Buggaguda | Kasipet |
| 21 | Kasipet | Lambadithanda (D) | Kasipet |
| 22 | Kasipet | Chinna darmaram | Kasipet |
