= National Highway 63 (India) =

National highway in India

National Highway 63
- Map of National Highway 63 in red

Route information
- Length: 1,065 km (662 mi)

Major junctions
- From: Kuslamb Maharashtra
- To: Koraput, Odisha

Location
- Country: India
- States: Maharastra: 423 km Telangana: 324 km Chhattisgarh: 239 km Odisha: 79 km
- Primary destinations: Kuslamb - Yedashi - Murud - Latur - Renapur - Udgir - Deglur - Atkali - Adampur - Khatgoan - Bodhan - Nizamabad - Jagtial - Mancherial - Chinnur - Chennur - Sironcha - Bijapur - Gidam - Bagmundi - Jagdalpur - Borigumma - Koraput

Highway system
- Roads in India; Expressways; National; State; Asian
← NH 62	→ NH 64

National Highway 63 (NH 63) is a National Highway in India, total length 1,065 km (662 mi). It passes through the states of Maharashtra, Telangana, Maharashtra, Chhattisgarh & Odisha.

== Route ==
- The highway starts at Daund and passes through:
  - Maharashtra: Kuslamb Barshi, Ramling, Yedshi, Latur, Renapur, Ashtamod, Nalegaon Udgir, Deglur, Sironcha, Kopela and Pathagudam
  - Telangana: Bodhan, Nizamabad, Armoor, Metpalli, Koratla, Jagtial, Luxettipet, Dharmapuri, Mancherial and Chennur
  - Chhattisgarh: Bhopalpatnam, Madded, Bijapur, Nimed, Bhairamgarh, Varetumnar, Gidam, Bagmundi and Jagdalpur
  - Odisha: Kotpad, Borigumma and Koraput
- The highway crosses National Highway 52 at Yedshi.
- The highway crosses National Highway 548B at Latur, Renapur.
- The highway crosses National Highway 361 at Ashtamod.
- The highway crosses National Highway 50 at Udgir.
- The highway crosses National Highway 44 at Armoor.
- National Highway 163 joins this highway at Bhopalpatnam.
- National Highway 563 joins this highway at Jagtial.
- National Highway 363 joins this highway at Mancherial.
- National Highway 30 joins this highway at Jagdalpur.
- National Highway 26 joins this highway at Borigumma which ends at Vizianagaram.

The highway crosses Godavari River on border of Peddapalli district and Mancherial district of Telangana state, Pranahita River on border of Maharashtra and Telangana and Indravati River on border of Maharashtra and Chhattisgarh. Bridges on border between Maharashtra and Telangana state across Pranahita River near Sironcha and across Indravathi River on Maharashtra and Chhattisgarh state near Bhopalpatnam are inaugurated and are functional. The future highway will connect Mumbai via Visakhapatnam, Cuttack and Bhubaneshwar.

== Gallery ==
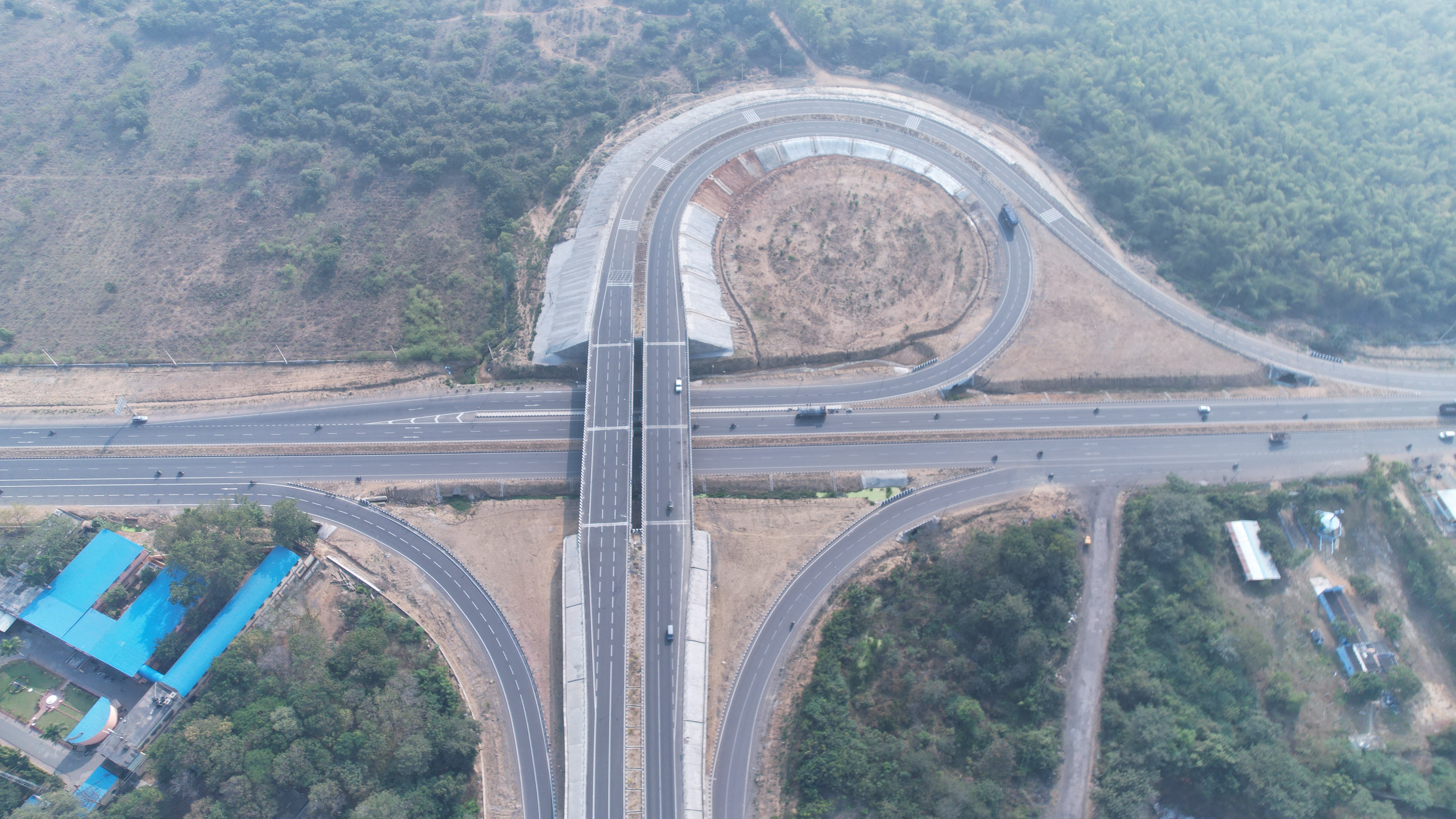
NH63/NH363 Trump interchange at Shrirampur, Mancherial

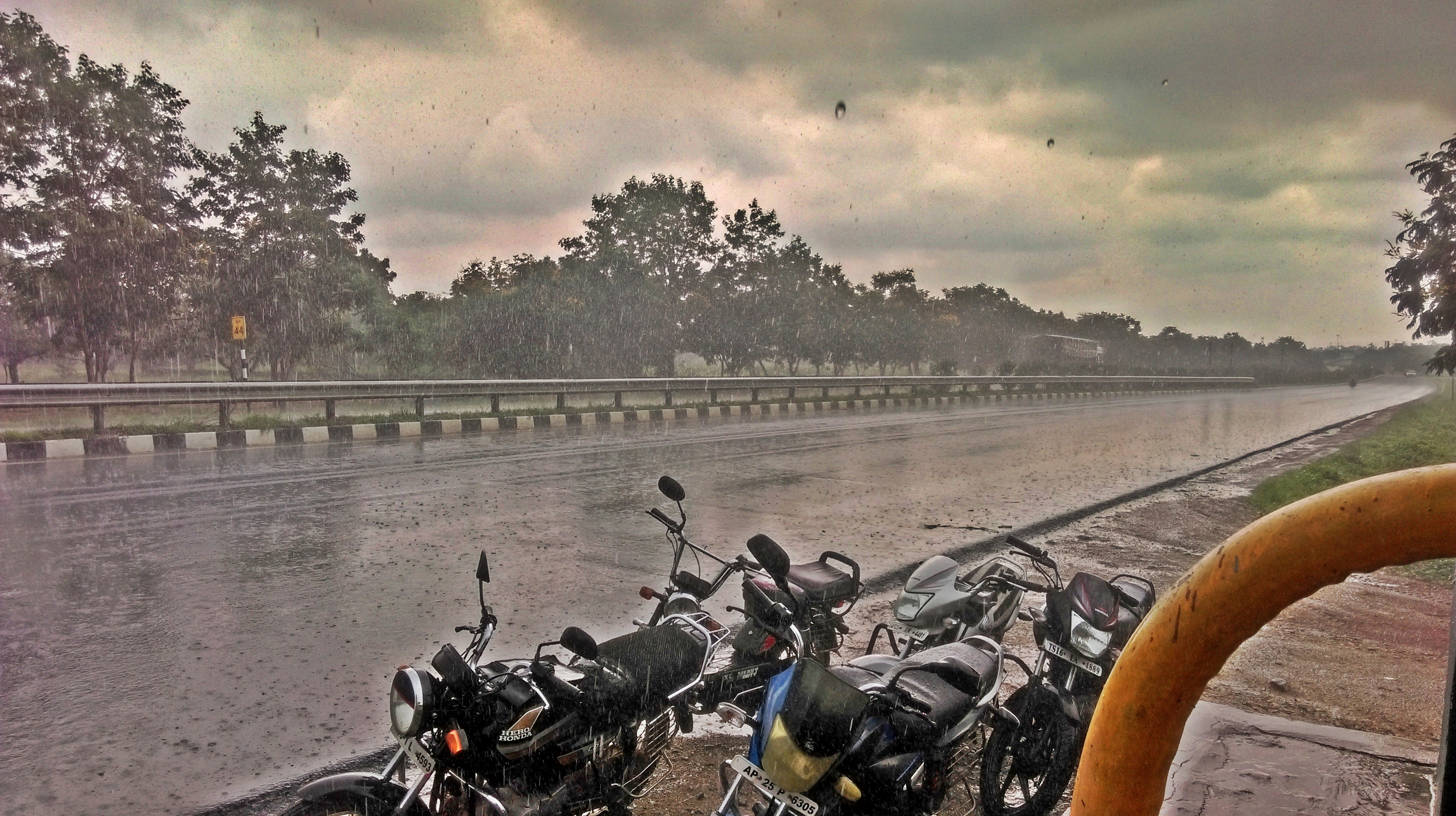
The section where NH 63 joins NH 44 in Nizamabad
