= Dandepalle, Hanamkonda district =

Dandepally Dandepally
- Village
- Interactive map of Dandepally
- Coordinates: 18.99814°N 79.154563°E
- Country: India
- State: Telangana
- District: Hanamkonda district
- Elevation: 291 m (955 ft)

Population (2011)
  - Total: 3,371

Languages
  - Official: Telugu
- Time zone: UTC+5:30 (IST)
- PIN: 505101
- Telephone code: 91-8727-
- Vehicle registration: TS 03
- Nearest city: Hanamakonda
- Lok Sabha constituency: Karimnagar
- Vidhan Sabha constituency: Husnabad

Dandepalle or Dandepally is a village in Elkathurthy mandal, Hanamkonda district (formerly Warangal Urban district), in the Indian state of Telangana. Prior to the creation of Telangana in 2014, the village was a part of Karimnagar district, Andhra Pradesh.
