= Luxettipet =

Luxettipet Lakshettipet
- Town
- Location in Telangana, India Luxettipet (India)
- Coordinates: 18.8667°N 79.2167°E
- Country: India
- State: Telangana
- District: Mancherial
- Founder: Edlabad(Nizam's)
- Named for: Laxmi shetty

Government
  - Type: Municipal council
  - Body: Luxettipet municipality
  - MLA: Sri Kokkirala Premsagar Rao (INC)
  - Council Chairman: Dontha Anjali(INC)
  - Vice-Chairman: Mothkuri Rajeshwari(INC)
  - Municipal Commissioner: T Rajalingu

Area
  - Total: 34.7 km^{2} (13.4 sq mi)
  - Rank: 6th in District
- Elevation: 145 m (476 ft)

Population (2018)
  - Total: 29,524
  - Rank: 68 in(Telangana)
  - Density: 851/km^{2} (2,200/sq mi)

Languages
  - Official: Telugu, Urdu
- Time zone: UTC+5:30 (IST)
- PIN: 504215
- Telephone code: 08739
- Vehicle registration: TG-19
- Website: luxettipetmunicipality.telangana.gov.in

Luxettipet or Lakshettipet is a municipality and census town in Mancherial district of the Indian state of Telangana. Located on the north bank of Godavari River. And it is municipality and the headquarters of Luxettipet mandal. It is located in Luxettipet mandal of Mancherial revenue division.

== Civicbody ==
Luxettipet Municipality, Municipal Council Luxettipet (MCL) is the civic body that administers the town. it was constituted as a third grade municipality in the year 2018.

== Demographics ==
Historical population
Year	Pop.	±%
2001	21,629	—
2011	29,524	+36.5%

See also List of cities in Telangana by population

Luxettipet Grampanchayat has been upgraded into 3rd grade Municipality duly merging the surrounding Uthkur, Itikyal and Modela Grampanchayats in the year 2018 vide G.O.Ms.No.93 M.A., dated:18-04-2018. As per 2011 census of India, Luxettipet Municipality population is 29524 and households is 5435, geographical area of the Municipality is 33.94 Sq.Kms(approx). The town is situated on Nizamabad - Mancherial - Jagdalpur National Highway 63 Road with a distance of 260 Kms. from the State Headquarter Hyderabad and 28 kms from District Headquarter Mancherial. River Godavari flows all along the Southern part of the Town and is the southern boundary of the Town.

== Administrative Divisions ==
There are 21 Villages in Luxettipet.

Sl.No.	Name of the Mandal	Villages in the Mandal
1	Luxettipet	Luxettipet
2	Luxettipet	Dowdepalle
3	Luxettipet	Patha Kommugudem
4	Luxettipet	Talamalla
5	Luxettipet	Challampet
6	Luxettipet	Balraopet
7	Luxettipet	Jendavenkatapur
8	Luxettipet	Rangapet
9	Luxettipet	Chandram
10	Luxettipet	Venkataraopet
11	Luxettipet	Ellaram
12	Luxettipet	Kothur
13	Luxettipet	Utukur
14	Luxettipet	Modela
15	Luxettipet	Itkyal
16	Luxettipet	Lingapur
17	Luxettipet	Thimmapur
18	Luxettipet	Laxmipur
19	Luxettipet	Pothepalle
20	Luxettipet	Gullakota
21	Luxettipet	Mittapally

== Places to visit ==
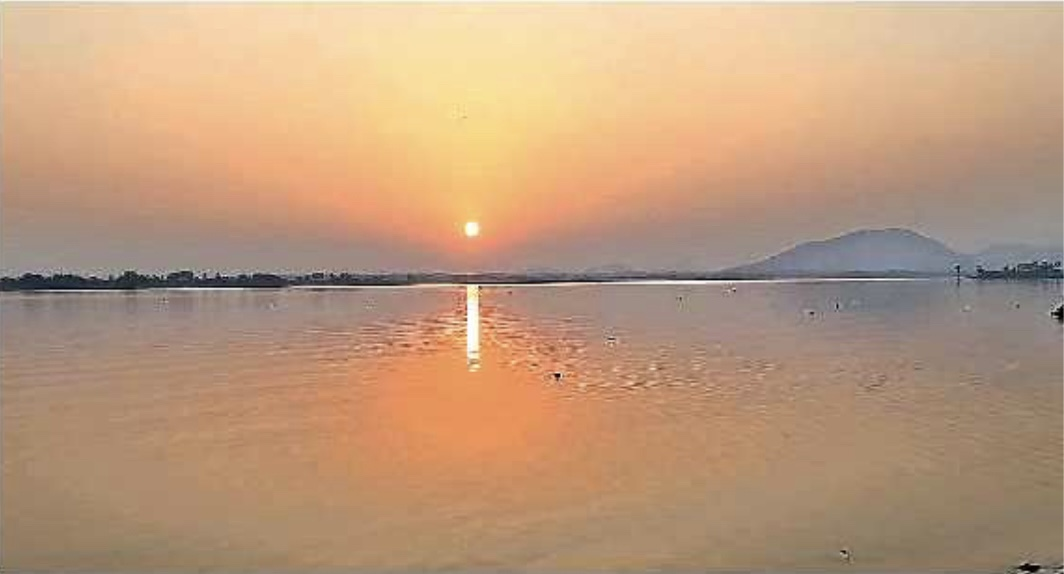
1. Godavari river sunset visual at luxettipet
  Jagannatha Temple and Shiva Temple Brahmin street
2. Gudem Gutta Shree Satyanarayana Swamy Temple and Ayyappa Swamy Temple
3. Sri Lakshmi Narasimha Swamy Devastanam located in Dharmapuri (about 20 km)
4. Chinnaiah-Peddaiah Devasthanam
5. CSI Church modela
6. Godavari River Yellampalli project back water
7. Gundala waterfall
8. Kotilingala on Godavari River boating
9. Luxettipet godavari pushkara ghat
10. Sai Baba temple gudem
11. Manchu kondalu near chinnaiah gutta temple

== Geography ==
Lakshettipet is located at 18.8667°N 79.2167°E on bank of Godavari River, Mancherial District. It has an average elevation of 145 meters (479 ft).

== Transport ==
National Highway 63 passes through this town.

== Government Colleges ==
- Government Degree College
- Government Junior College
- Government Model Degree College

== Government schools ==
- TSWRSJC Luxettipet
- KGBV Luxettipet
