= Dandepalle mandal =

Subdivision in Telangana, India

Coordinates: 19°03′30″N 79°07′39″E

Dandepalle is a mandal in Mancherial district in the state of Telangana in India.

== Administrative divisions ==
There are 30 Villages in the Mandal.

| Sl.No. | Name of the Mandal | Villages in the Mandal | Name of the Erstwhile Mandals from which the present Mandal is formed |
|---|---|---|---|
| 1 | Dandepally | Gurrevu | Dandepally |
| 2 | Dandepally | Allipur | Dandepally |
| 3 | Dandepally | Nagasamudram | Dandepally |
| 4 | Dandepally | Tallapet | Dandepally |
| 5 | Dandepally | Makulpet | Dandepally |
| 6 | Dandepally | Mamidipalle | Dandepally |
| 7 | Dandepally | Kundelapahad | Dandepally |
| 8 | Dandepally | Tanimadugu | Dandepally |
| 9 | Dandepally | Dandepalle | Dandepally |
| 10 | Dandepally | Medaripet | Dandepally |
| 11 | Dandepally | Lingapur | Dandepally |
| 12 | Dandepally | Bikkanguda | Dandepally |
| 13 | Dandepally | Laxmikantapur | Dandepally |
| 14 | Dandepally | Dwaraka | Dandepally |
| 15 | Dandepally | Peddapet | Dandepally |
| 16 | Dandepally | Dharmaraopet | Dandepally |
| 17 | Dandepally | Narsapur | Dandepally |
| 18 | Dandepally | Venkatapur | Dandepally |
| 19 | Dandepally | Chintapalle | Dandepally |
| 20 | Dandepally | Karvichelma | Dandepally |
| 21 | Dandepally | Mutyampet | Dandepally |
| 22 | Dandepally | Rebbenpalle | Dandepally |
| 23 | Dandepally | Andugulpet | Dandepally |
| 24 | Dandepally | Kondapur | Dandepally |
| 25 | Dandepally | Kasipet | Dandepally |
| 26 | Dandepally | Velganoor | Dandepally |
| 27 | Dandepally | Jaidapet | Dandepally |
| 28 | Dandepally | Nambal | Dandepally |
| 29 | Dandepally | Gudam | Dandepally |
| 30 | Dandepally | Kamepalle | Dandepally |
