= Dandepalle, Mancherial district =

Dandepally
- Village
- Location in Telangana, India Dandepally (India)
- Coordinates: 19.0150977°N 79.1001711°E
- Country: India
- State: Telangana
- District: Mancherial

Population (2011)
  - Total: 5,147

Languages
  - Official: Telugu
- Time zone: UTC+5:30 (IST)
- PIN: 505101

Dandepallol is a village located in Mancherial district of the Indian state of Telangana. It is one of the mandal of Mancherial revenue division.

Before Mancherial district was created in 2016, Dandepalle was in Adilabad district.

== Geography ==
Dandepally is located at 19.0150977°N 79.1001711°E.
