= Mancherial district =

- District
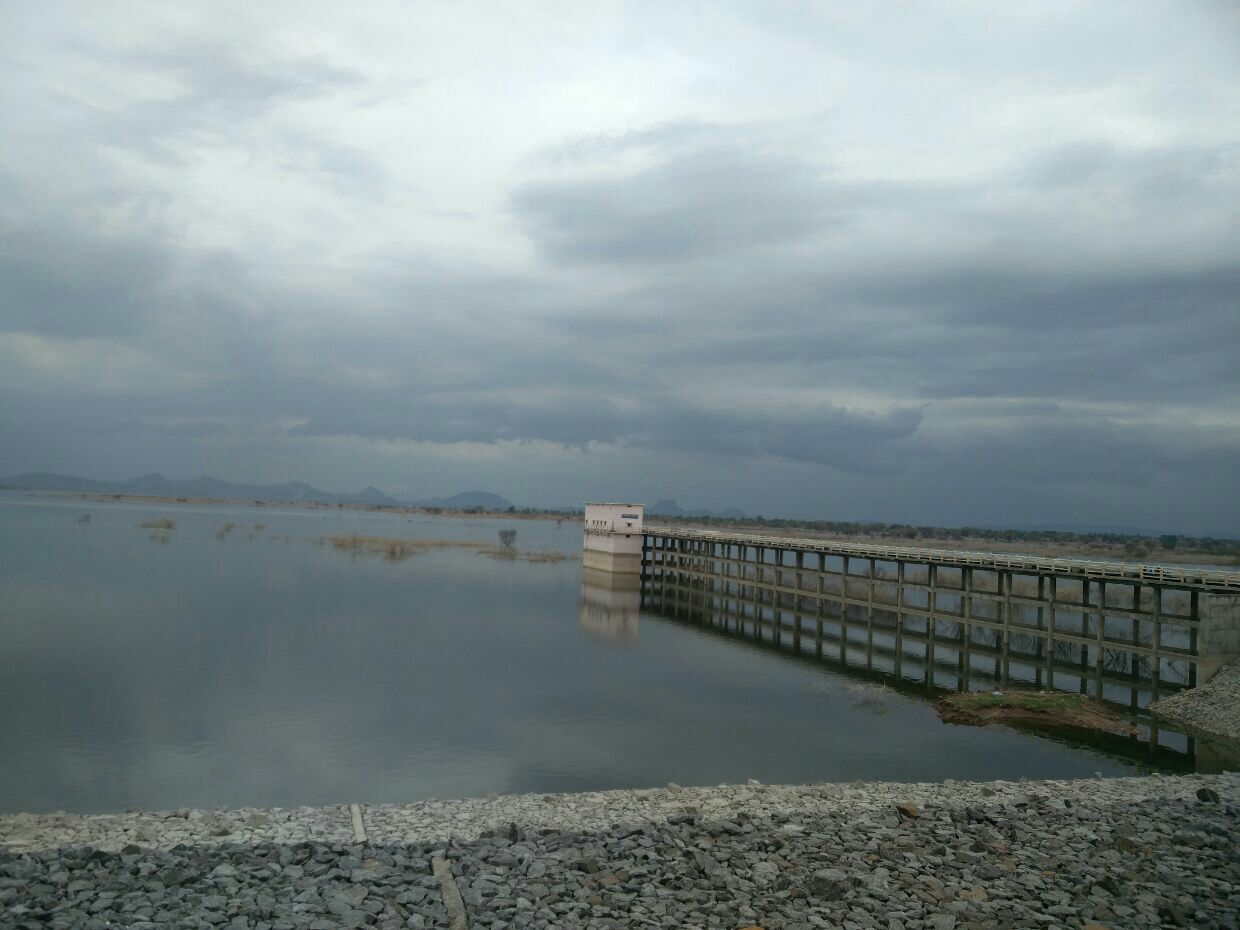
- Yellampelli project

- Location in Telangana
- Coordinates (Mancherial): 18.871454°N 79.444361°E
- Country: India
- State: Telangana
- Division: Mancherial
- Headquarters: Mancherial
- Mandalas: 18

Government
  - District collector: Sri. Kumar Deepak, IAS
  - Parliament Constituencies: Peddapalli
  - Assembly constituencies: Mancherial, Chennur, Bellampalli
  - MP: Vamsi Krishna Gaddam
  - Commissioner of Police: Ambar Kishor Jha(IPS) (Ramagundam Police Commissionerate)

Area
  - Total: 4,016.46 km^{2} (1,550.76 sq mi)

Population (2011)
  - Total: 807,037
  - Density: 78/km^{2} (201/sq mi)
  - Urban: 366,557
  - Rural: 440,481
- Demonym: Mancherialite
- Time zone: UTC+05:30 (IST)
- Vehicle registration: TG–19
- Major highways: NH 63, SH1 (Rajiv rahadari), NH 363, NH163G Mancherial- Vijayawada GFH
- Literacy rate: 64.35%
- Website: mancherial.telangana.gov.in

Mancherial district is a district located in the northern region of the Indian state of Telangana. The district comprises 18 mandals and three revenue divisions – Mancherial, Chennur and Bellampalli. Mancherial is the district headquarters. It is surrounded by Komaram Bheem, Nirmal, Jagtial, Peddapalli and Bhupalpally districts of Telangana and with Maharashtra state.

== History ==
Mancherial district was formed from Adilabad district in 2016 as a part of reorganization of districts in Telangana.

== Administrative divisions ==
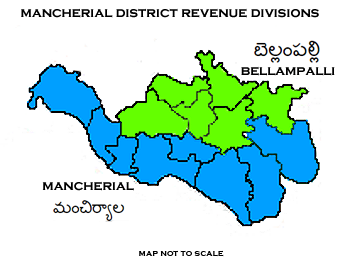
Mancherial District Revenue divisions

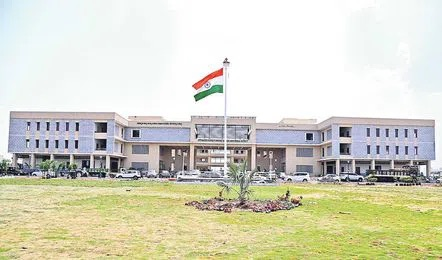
IDOC building Mancherial

The district has three revenue divisions of Mancherial, Bellampally, and Chennur which are sub-divided into 18 mandals. Sri. Kumar Deepak, IAS is the present collector of the district.

Mancherial District Revenue Divisions Mandals Information List:

Mancherial District revenue mandals and information list:
Demographics Label	Value	Remarks
Number of revenue divisions	3	Mancherial Bellampalli Chennur
No of revenue mandals	18	
No of praja parishads	16	
No of revenue villages	311	
No of gram panchayats	382	
No of municipalities	5	Bellampalle Chennur Kyathanpally Luxettipet Mandamarri
No of municipal corporations	1	Mancherial

=== Revenue mandals ===
There are 18 mandals in District.

Chennur Revenue Division	Mancherial Revenue Division	Bellampally Revenue Division
Chennur	Luxettipet	Kasipet
Jaipur	Mancherial	Bellampally
Bheemaram (new)	Naspur (new)	Vemanpally
Kotapally	Hajipur (new)	Nennel
Mandamarri	Dandepalle	Tandur
Asnad (new)	Jannaram	Bheemini
Parpally (new)		Kannepally (new)

== Geography ==
The district is spread over an area of 4,016.46 km^{2} (1,550.76 sq mi). It shares borders with Gadchiroli district of Maharashtra on the east, Jayashankar Bhupalpally, Peddapalli and Jagitial districts to the south, Nirmal district to the west and Kumaram Bheem Asifabad district to the north.

The district is very fertile plains fed by the Godavari river, which forms the southern border of the district.

== Demographics ==
Religion in Mancherial district (2011)
Hinduism	92.55%
Islam	5.58%
Christianity	0.98%
Other or not stated	0.89%

As of 2011 Census of India, the district has a population of 807,037. Mancherial has a sex ratio of 977 females to 1000 males and a literacy rate of 64.35%. There are 148,377 farmers and 344,785 labourers. 73,725 (9.14%) were under 6 years of age. 353,847 (43.85%) lived in urban areas. Scheduled Castes and Scheduled Tribes make up 199,493 (24.72%) and 56,969 (7.06%) of the population respectively.

Languages of Mancherial district (2011)
1. Telugu (88.1%)
2. Urdu (5.13%)
3. Lambadi (1.67%)
4. Marathi (1.60%)
5. Gondi (1.44%)
6. Others (2.08%)

At the time of the 2011 census, 88.08% of the population spoke Telugu, 5.13% Urdu, 1.67% Lambadi, 1.60% Marathi and 1.44% Gondi as their first language.

== Tourist places ==
- Kawal Tiger Reserve is a nature preserve located at Jannaram mandal of Mancherial District
- Pranahita Wildlife Sanctuary. Covers 136 square kilometres (53 sq mi) and is famous for Blackbuck, otherwise known as Indian antelope.
- Shivaram Wildlife Sanctuary is a wildlife preserve in Mancherial district, located 10 km from Manthani, 40 km from Peddapalli, 80 km from Karimnagar and 30 km from Godavarikhani. This riverine forest mixed with teak and terminalia is spread over 36.29 square kilometres (14.01 sq mi)
- Gudem Gutta Shree Satyanarayana Swamy Temple, Gudem Village, in Dandepalle mandal Mancherial district.
- Gadpur Jungle Safari is located in Gadpur Village, it is 2 km away from Mancherial.
- Gandhari khilla is hill fort. It is located in the village of Bokkalagutta 4 km from Mancherial.
- Singareni Thermal Power Plant located in Jaipur Mandal Mancherial District.

== Industrial profile ==
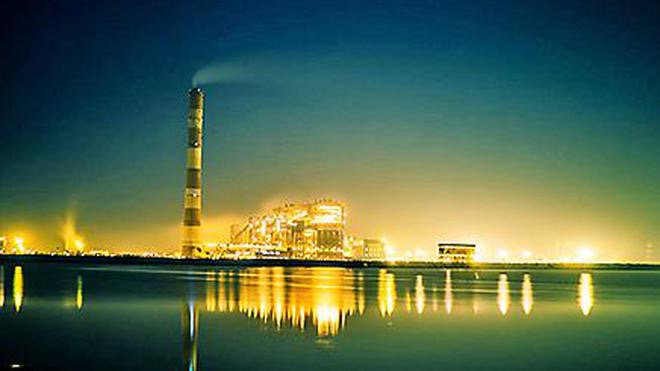
Singareni Thermal Power Plant at Pegadapalli

Mancherial district has a mix of large, small, and micro-scale industries. Major industries include coal, cement, thermal power plant, ceramic, rice mills and fly-ash bricks manufacturing. The district also has a limited presence of cotton-based industries.

== Transport ==
Mancherial is well connected with all types of transport facilities major are Road and Rail. Mancherial railway station is the train station with code: MCI.

List of important railway stations in mancherial district with railway station codes :

- Bellampally railway station (BPA)
- Mancherial railway station (MCI)

Telangana State Road Transport Corporation (TSRTC )has its depot in Mancherial connecting transportation facility to the citizens to every village and city of Mancherial district.

== Road ==
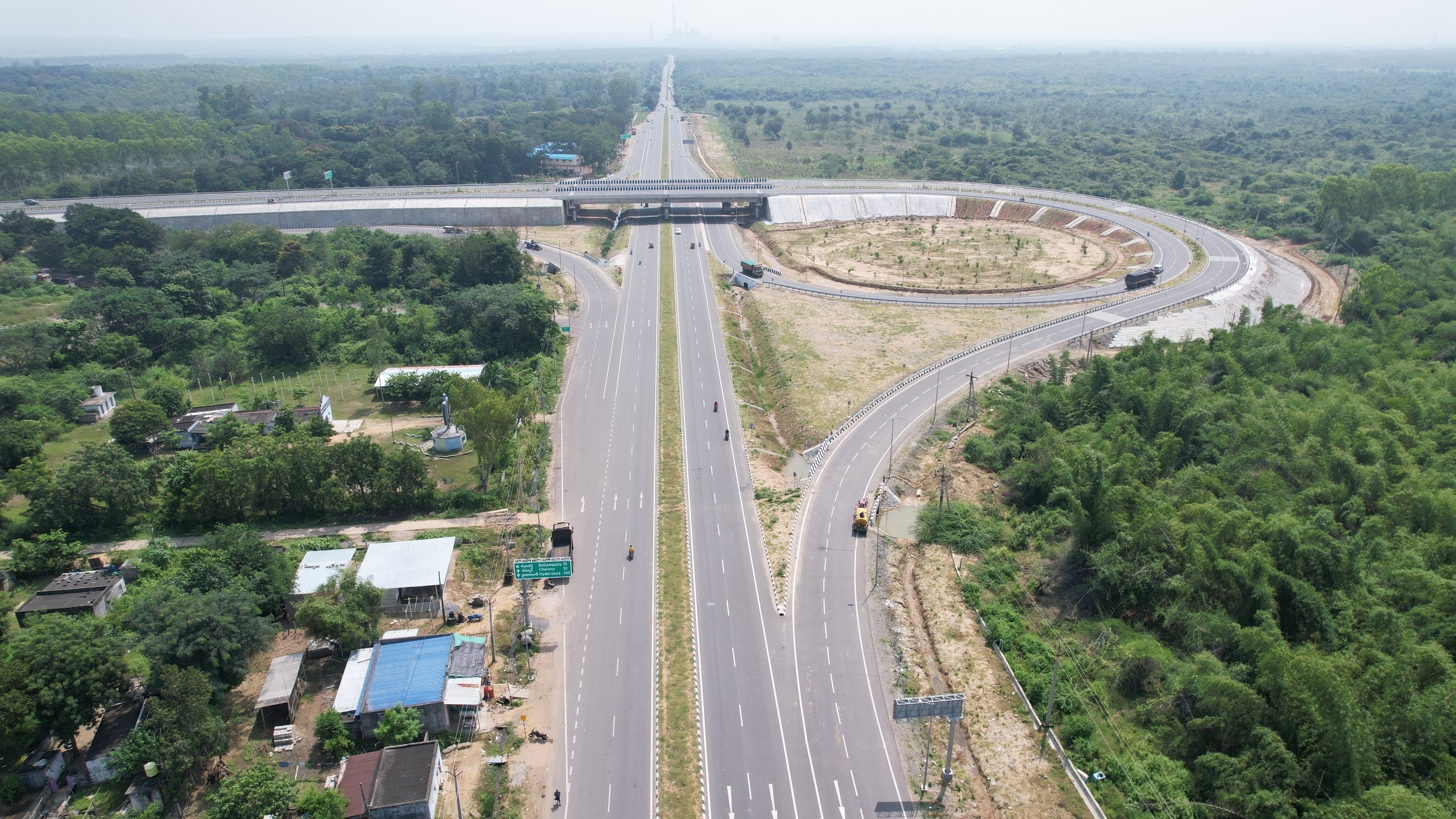
NH363 Mncl Interchange

NH 63 Jagdalpur to yedashi via renapur latur bodhan nizamabad passes through Mancherial.

NH 363 A new National highway is being constructed from Mancherial to Chandrapur.

Also another new National highway is sanctioned from Jaipur Mandal to Warangal via Manthani and Bhupalpally. This Highway is named as Green Industrial corridor by NHAI.

=== Air ===
Nearest airport is Hyderabad International Airport 285 km (177 mi) away from the district headquarters Mancherial city.

== Gallery ==
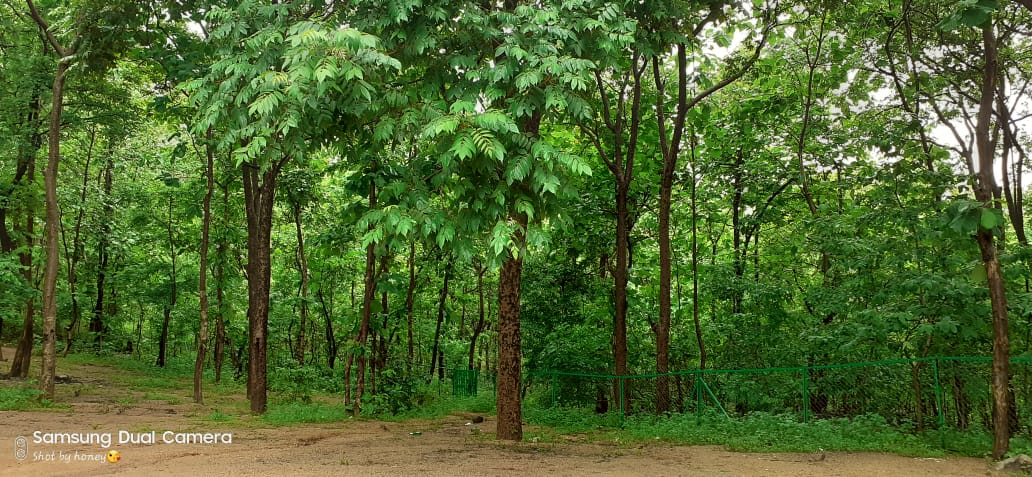
The outer view of Reserve

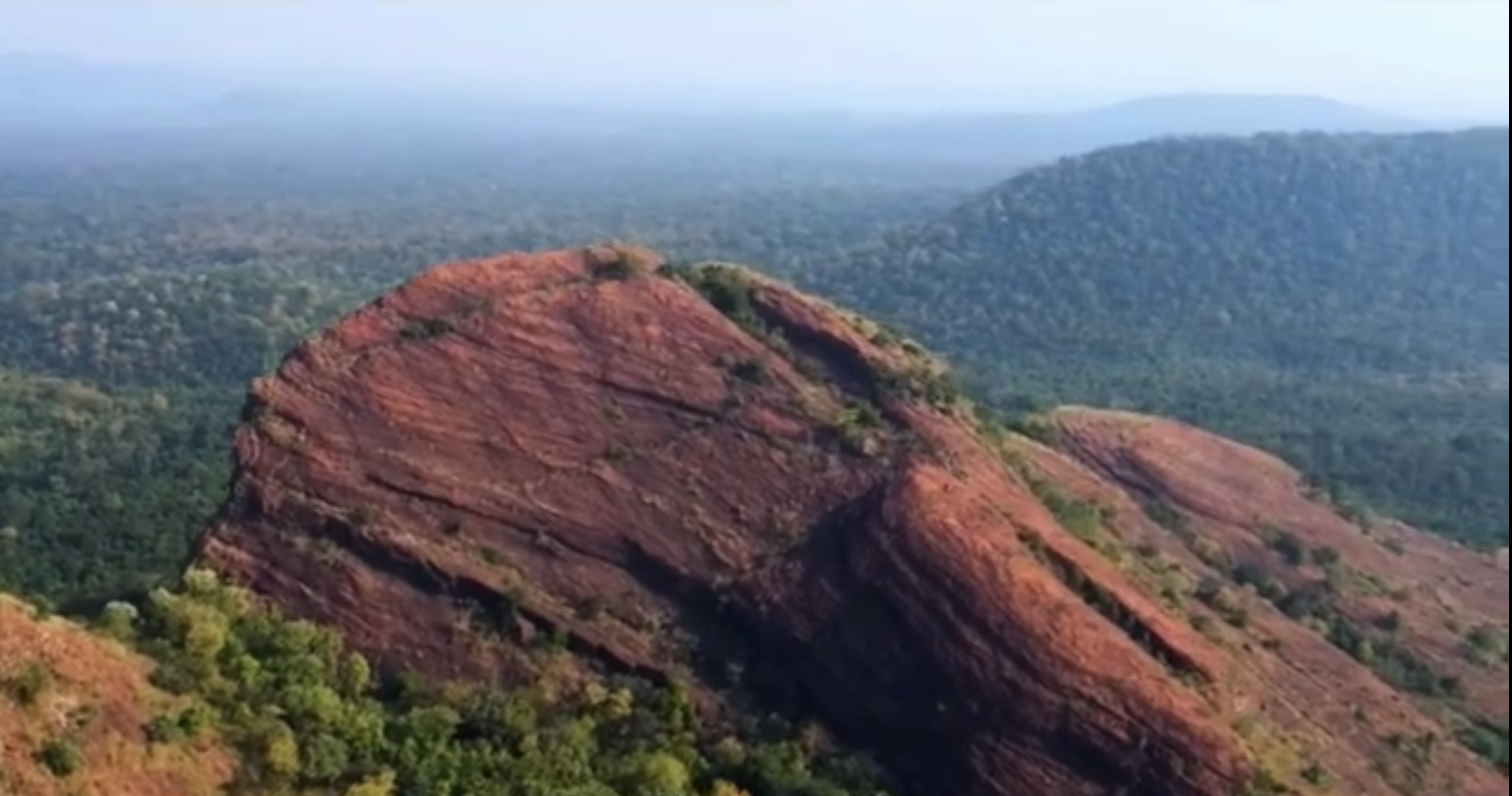
Gandhari Khilla

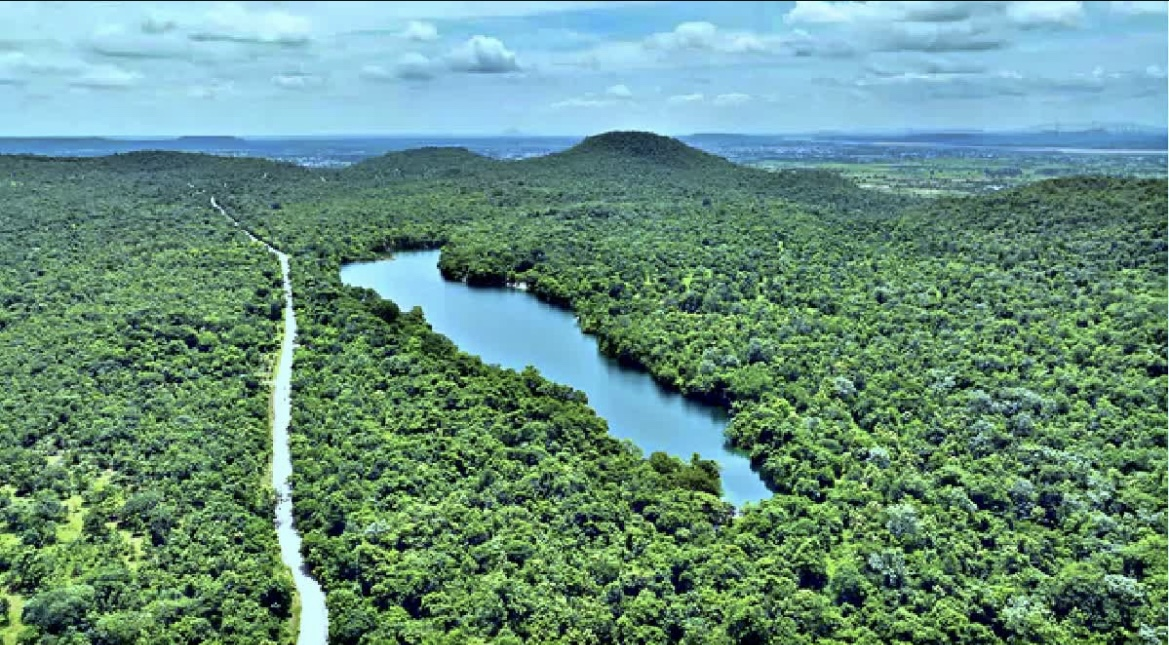
Gadpur Jungle Safari

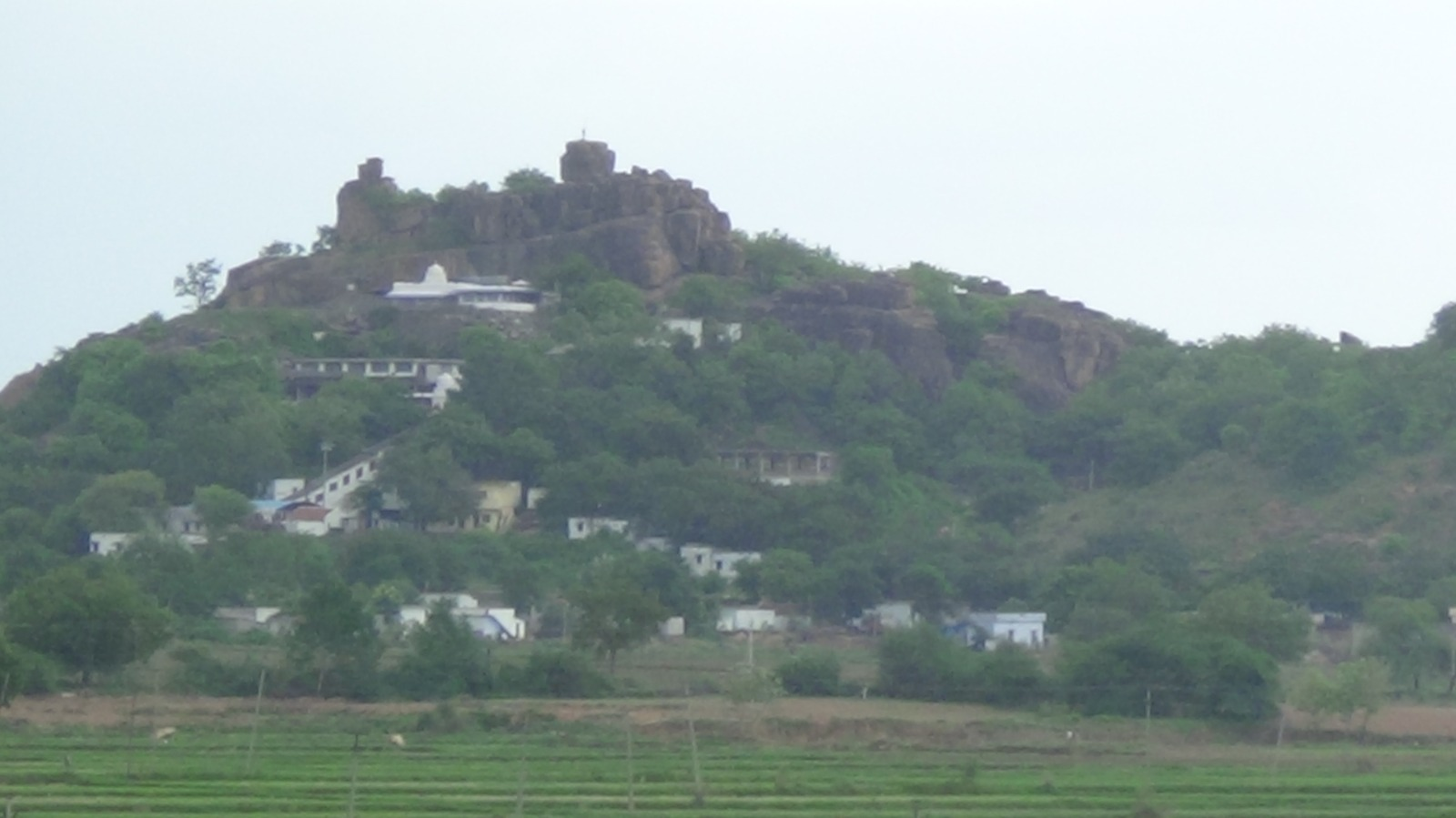
Gudem Gutta

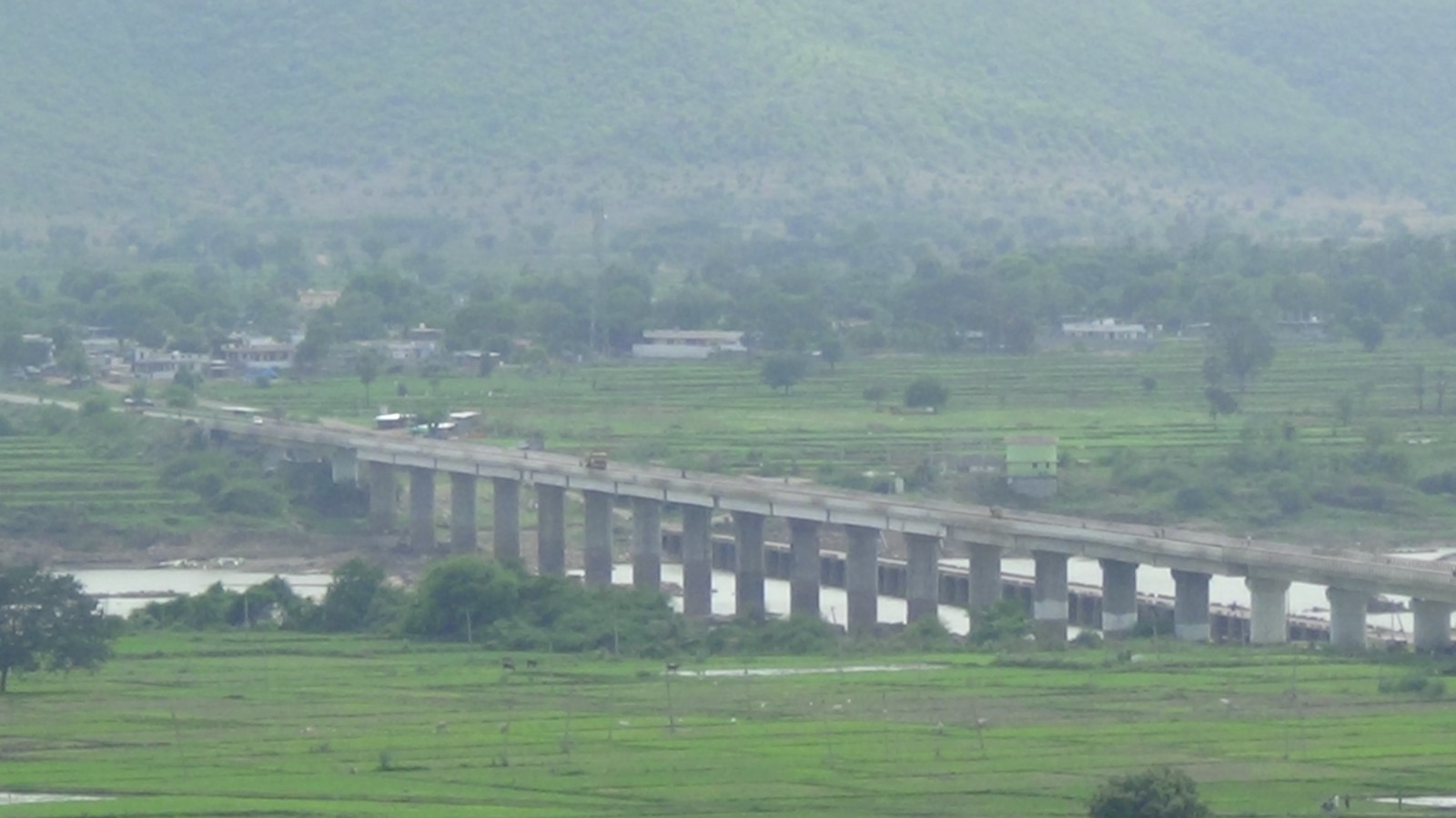
View of Rayapatnam Bridge over Godavari river

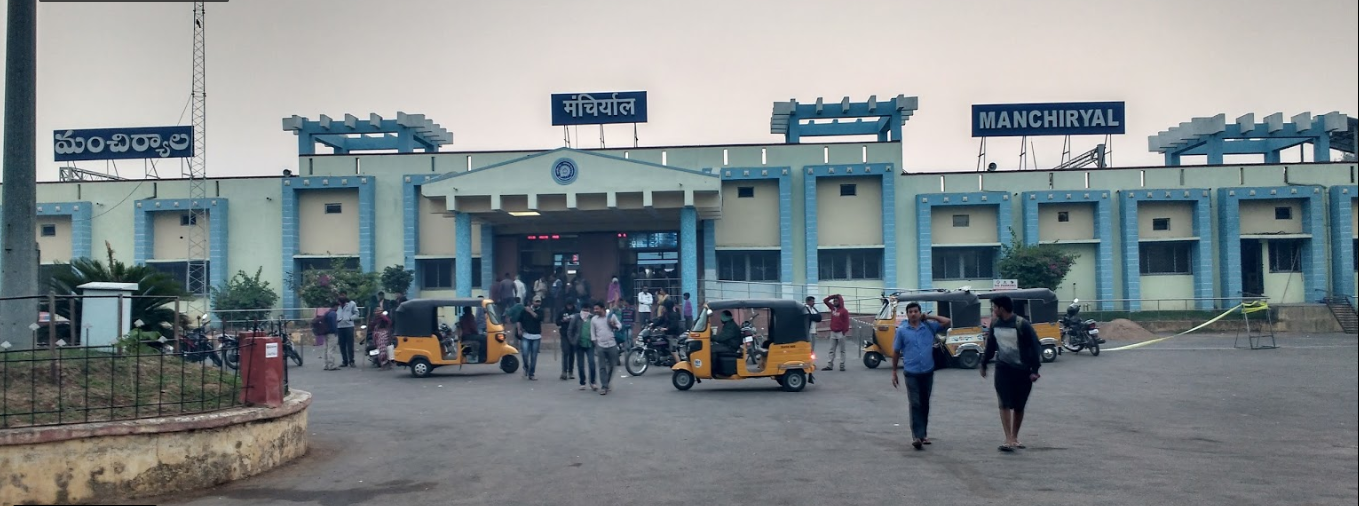
Mancherial railway station

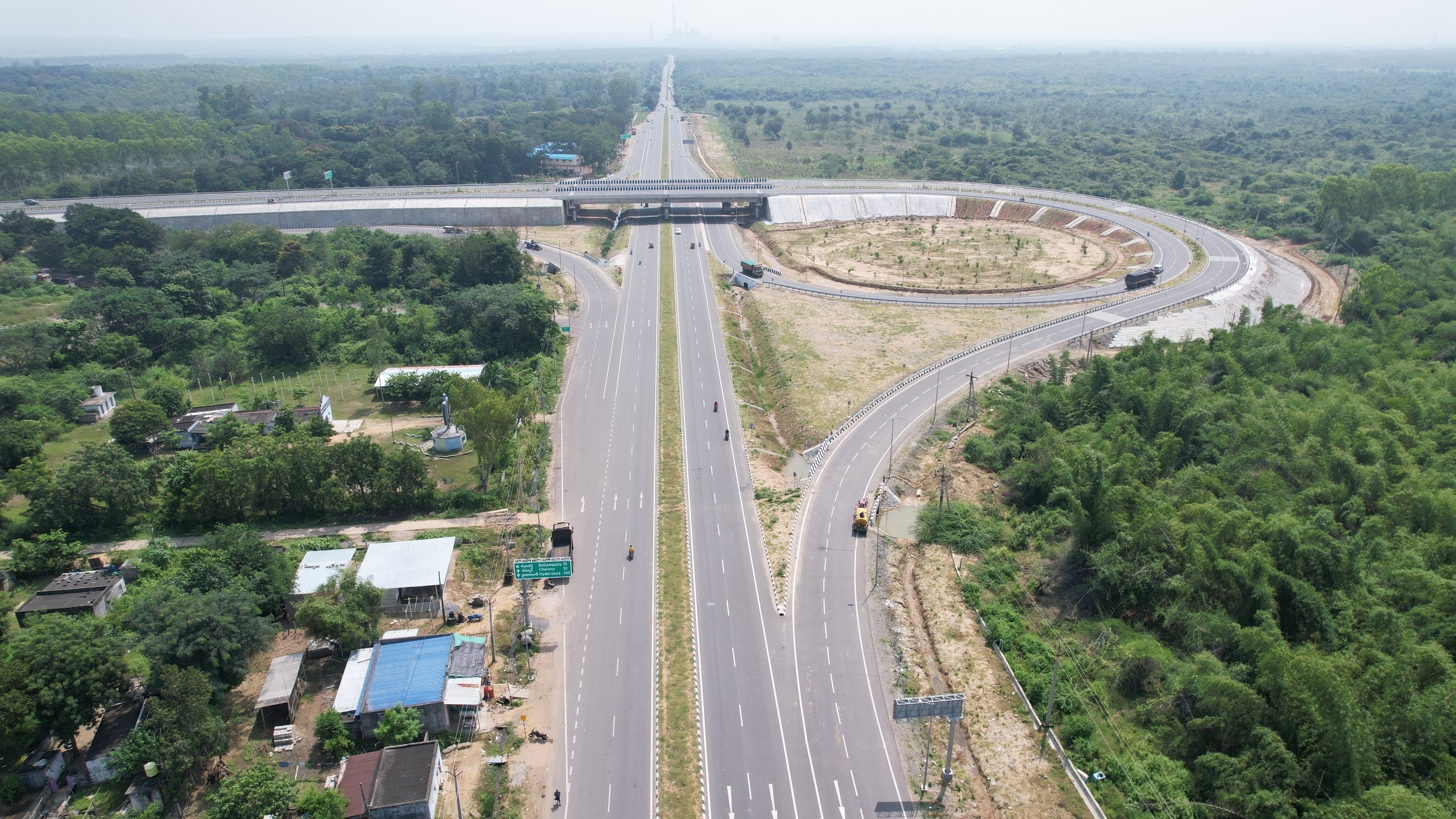
NH363 Interchange near Mancherial

== See also ==
- List of districts in Telangana
- List of revenue divisions in Telangana
- List of urban local bodies in Telangana
- List of municipalities in Telangana
- List of municipal corporationsTelangana
