= Bellampalle =

Bellampalli
- Town
- Location in Telangana Bellampalli (India)
- Coordinates: 19°4′32″N 79°29′17″E
- Country: India
- State: Telangana
- District: Mancherial

Government
  - Type: Municipality
  - Body: Bellampalli Municipality
  - Municipal Chairman: Dava Swathi Ramesh Babu (INC)
  - Vice-chairman: Ragamshetti Satyanaarayana(INC)
  - Municipal Commissioner: Sri. A Krishna Lal

Area
  - Total: 35.06 km^{2} (13.54 sq mi)

Population (2011)
  - Total: 66,789
  - Rank: 34th(Telangana)
  - Density: 1,905/km^{2} (4,934/sq mi)
- Demonym: bellampallian
- Time zone: UTC+5.30 (IST)
- Postal code: 504 xxx
- Vehicle registration: TG 19
- Lok Sabha constituency: peddapalli
- Assembly constituency: Bellampalli
- Website: Bellampalli Municipality - Shri.R Bhujanga Rao, Municipal commissioner

Bellampalli is a town in Mancherial district of the Indian state of Telangana. It is a municipality and mandal headquarters of Bellampalli mandal of Bellampalli revenue division.

== Spellings ==
Alternative spellings are Bellampalle and Bellampally.

== History ==
Bellampalli is noted for its coal mines belonging to Singareni Collieries Company Limited.So Goleti is named as bellampally area .Bellampalli has in past the most coal mines and opencast mines in the state of Telangana. The first coal mine was established in 1936 by the British government. Later, the town developed very rapidly with the discovery and excavation of many more coal mines. The coal production from the SCCL is catering to the needs of the National Thermal Power Corporation, Ramagundam and many surrounding industrial buildings such as cement plants in Devapur, steel factory in Visakhapatnam and power plants in Maharashtra

== Demographics ==
Historical population
Year	Pop.	±%
1941	6,294	—
1951	15,874	+152.2%
1961	29,101	+83.3%
1971	30,290	+4.1%
1981	44,721	+47.6%
1991	66,780	+49.3%
2001	66,792	+0.0%
2011	55,841	−16.4%

According to the 2001 India census, Bellampalli had a population of 66,660. Males constitute 51% of the population and females 49%. Bellampalli has a literacy rate of 66%, higher than the national average of 60%, with 57% of the males and 43% of females literate. 11% of the population is under 6 years of age.

== Government and politics ==
=== Civic administration ===
Bellampalle Municipality was constituted in 1987 and is classified as a second grade municipality with 32 election wards. The jurisdiction of the civic body is spread over an area of 35.06 km^{2} (13.54 mi^{2}).

=== Politics ===
Bellampalli has been a traditional stronghold and birthplace of the CPI, also known as the Communist Party of India. CPI leader Gunda Mallesh won the MLA seat for Bellampally in the 2009 elections. Gunda Mallesh is a senior politician from Bellampally and the CPI. The former MLA's of this of constituency are Amurajula Sreedevi and Pati Subadra. Bellampalli assembly constituency comes under Peddapalli Lok Sabha constituency. Gaddam Vamshi krishna is present MP.

MLA's of Bellampalli

- Sridevi (TDP)-2004
- Gunda Mallesh (CPI) -2009
- Durgam Chinnaiah (TRS) -2014
- Durgam Chinnaiah (TRS) -2018
- Gaddam Vinod (Congress) - 2023

== Administravtive Division ==
There are 13 Villages under Bellampalli.

Sl.No.	Name of the Mandal	Villages in the Mandal	Name of the Erstwhile Mandals from which the present Mandal is formed
1	Bellampalli	Bellampalle	Bellampalli
2	Bellampalli	Ankusam	Bellampalli
3	Bellampalli	Kannal (R)	Bellampalli
4	Bellampalli	Chakepalle	Bellampalli
5	Bellampalli	Budha Khurd (R)	Bellampalli
6	Bellampalli	Budha Kalan (R)	Bellampalli
7	Bellampalli	Chandravelli	Bellampalli
8	Bellampalli	Rangapet	Bellampalli
9	Bellampalli	Dugnepalle	Bellampalli
10	Bellampalli	Gurjal (R) @ Talla Gurjal	Bellampalli
11	Bellampalli	Akenipalle	Bellampalli
12	Bellampalli	Batwanpalle	Bellampalli
13	Bellampalli	Perkapalle	Bellampalli

== Economy ==
Coal production has been very important to the economic history of Bellampalli and it is thus known as an industrial town. However, the average income of Rs. 5000/- per capita according to 1989 figures mean that the average person is living in poverty.

== Transport ==
Bellampalli is well connected by road and train.

NH 363 A new National Highway is being constructed from Mancherial to chandrapur passes through Bellampalli

Bellampally railway station (BPA) is an early-established railway stations in Telangana region and it lies in Nagpur–Hyderabad line. The railway station code is BPA.

Bellampalli comes under south central railway and its 273 km distance towards North (Delhi route) from Hyderabad (Capital of the state).

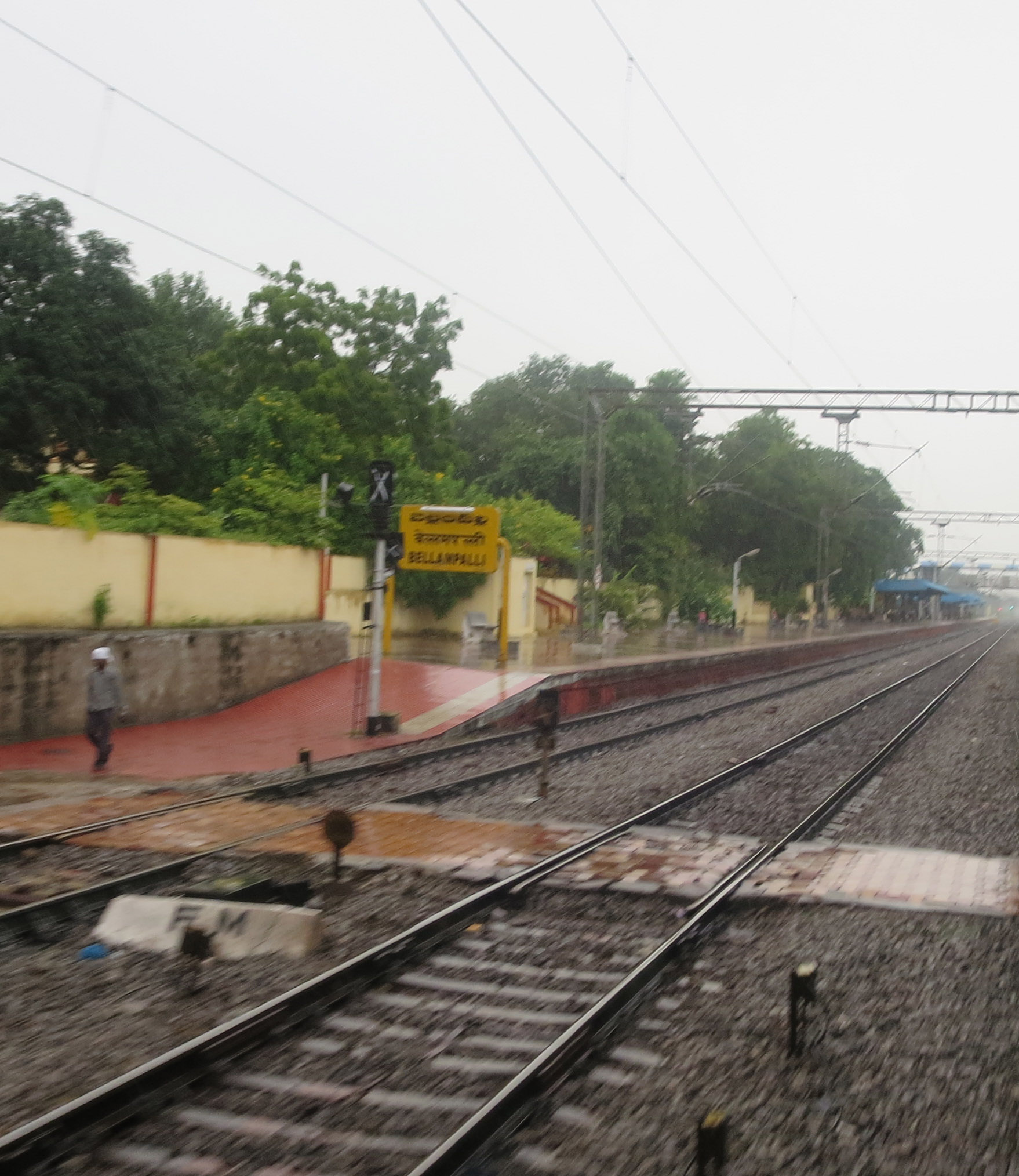
Bellampally railway station
