= Mandamarri =

Mandamarri Kalyanikhani
- Town
- Location in Telangana, India Mandamarri (India)
- Coordinates: 18°58′56″N 79°28′52″E
- Country: India
- State: Telangana
- District: Mancherial

Government
  - Type: municipal council
  - Body: Municipality

Area
  - Total: 38.84 km^{2} (15.00 sq mi)
- Elevation: 188 m (617 ft)

Population (2011)
  - Total: 66,176
  - Rank: 40th in(Telangana)
  - Density: 1,704/km^{2} (4,413/sq mi)

Languages
  - Official: Telugu
- Time zone: UTC+5:30 (IST)
- PIN: 504231
- Telephone code: telephone code (STD) 08736
- Vehicle registration: TG 19
- Website: telangana.gov.in

Mandamarri is a town municipality and mandal located in Mancherial district in the Indian state of Telangana.

== Demographics ==
As of 2001 India census, Mandamarri had a population of 66,176. Males constitute 51% of the population and females 49%. Mandamarri has an average literacy rate of 61%, higher than the national average of 59.5%. Male literacy is 70%, and female literacy is 52%. 10% of the population is under 6 years of age.

Historical population
| Year | Pop. | ±% |
|---|---|---|
| 1971 | 22,327 | — |
| 1981 | 44,483 | +99.2% |
| 1991 | 66,145 | +48.7% |
| 2001 | 66,596 | +0.7% |
| 2011 | 52,352 | −21.4% |

== Economy ==
Most of the population works in agriculture. There are several underground and open cast coal mines under Singareni Collieries Company Limited (SCCL) (Singareni Coal Mines).

== Government and politics ==
=== Civic administration ===
Mandamarri Municipality was constituted in 1952 and is classified as a second grade municipality with 36 election wards. The jurisdiction of the civic body is spread over an area of 38.84 km^{2} (15.00 mi^{2}).

== Schools ==
- Little Flowers High School
- Singareni Collieries High School
- Carmel High School
- ZPSS Mandamarri
- UPS School mandamarri
- Tawakkal High school
- Montessori High School
- Model School
- Sri chaitanya High school

== Parks ==
Singareni Green Park

== Administrative Division ==
There are nine villages in Mandamarri.

| Sl.No. | Name of the Mandal | Villages in the Mandal | Name of the Erstwhile Mandals from which the present Mandal is formed |
|---|---|---|---|
| 1 | Mandamarri | Mandamarri | Mandamarri |
| 2 | Mandamarri | Andgulapet | Mandamarri |
| 3 | Mandamarri | Chirrakunta | Mandamarri |
| 4 | Mandamarri | Sarangapalle | Mandamarri |
| 5 | Mandamarri | Thimmapur | Mandamarri |
| 6 | Mandamarri | Amerwadi | Mandamarri |
| 7 | Mandamarri | Venkatapur | Mandamarri |
| 8 | Mandamarri | Ponnaram | Mandamarri |
| 9 | Mandamarri | Mamidighat | Mandamarri |
