= Gaddam =

Gaddam (Telugu: గడ్డం) is a Telugu surname. Variants of the surname include Gadam, Gaddamu, Geddam, and Geddamu. Notable people with the surname include:

- Gadam Samuel Luke (1920–2000), Indian bishop
- Gaddam Ganga Reddy (1933–2017), Indian politician
- Gaddam Padmaja Reddy (born 1967), Indian Kuchipudi exponent
- Gaddam Prasad Kumar (born 1964), Indian politician
- Gaddam Ram Reddy (1929–1995), Indian professor
- Gaddam Ranjith Reddy (born 1964), Indian politician
- Gaddam Sammaiah (born 1958), Indian theatre artist
- Gaddam Vamsi Krishna (born 1989), Indian politician
- Gaddam Venkatswamy (1929–2014), Indian politician
- Gaddam Vinod Kumar (born 1956), Indian politician
- Gaddam Vivekanand (born 1957), Indian politician
- Geddam Srinivas Naidu (born 1969), Indian politician
