= 2010 elections in India =

Elections in India
- 2010

== Legislative Assembly elections ==
Date(s)	State	Government before election	Chief Minister before election	Government after election	Chief Minister after election	Maps
21 October 2010 – 20 November 2010	Bihar	Janata Dal (United)	Nitish Kumar	Janata Dal (United)	Nitish Kumar	
21 October 2010 – 20 November 2010	Bihar	Bharatiya Janata Party	Nitish Kumar	Bharatiya Janata Party	Nitish Kumar	

== Parliamentary By-election ==
S.No	Date	Constituency	State	MP before election	Party before election	Elected MP	Party after election
27	1 November 2010	Banka	Bihar	Digvijay Singh	Independent	Putul Kumari	Independent

== Assembly By-elections ==
=== Andhra Pradesh ===
S.No	Date	Constituency	MLA before election	Party before election	Elected MLA	Party after election
1	27 July 2010	Sirpur	Kaveti Sammaiah	Telangana Rashtra Samithi	Kaveti Sammaiah	Telangana Rashtra Samithi
2	27 July 2010	Chennur	Nallala Odelu	Telangana Rashtra Samithi	Nallala Odelu	Telangana Rashtra Samithi
4	27 July 2010	Mancherial	Gaddam Aravinda Reddy	Telangana Rashtra Samithi	Gaddam Aravinda Reddy	Telangana Rashtra Samithi
15	27 July 2010	Yellareddy	Eanugu Ravinder Reddy	Telangana Rashtra Samithi	Eanugu Ravinder Reddy	Telangana Rashtra Samithi
17	27 July 2010	Nizamabad Urban	Endela Lakshminarayana	Bharatiya Janata Party	Endela Lakshminarayana	Bharatiya Janata Party
20	27 July 2010	Koratla	Kalvakuntla Vidya Sagar Rao	Telangana Rashtra Samithi	Kalvakuntla Vidya Sagar Rao	Telangana Rashtra Samithi
22	27 July 2010	Dharmapuri	Koppula Eshwar	Telangana Rashtra Samithi	Koppula Eshwar	Telangana Rashtra Samithi
28	27 July 2010	Vemulawada	Chennamaneni Ramesh	Telugu Desam Party	Chennamaneni Ramesh	Telangana Rashtra Samithi
29	27 July 2010	Sircilla	K. T. Rama Rao	Telangana Rashtra Samithi	K. T. Rama Rao	Telangana Rashtra Samithi
31	27 July 2010	Huzurabad	Etela Rajender	Telangana Rashtra Samithi	Etela Rajender	Telangana Rashtra Samithi
33	27 July 2010	Siddipet	T. Harish Rao	Telangana Rashtra Samithi	T. Harish Rao	Telangana Rashtra Samithi
105	27 July 2010	Warangal West	Dasyam Vinay Bhasker	Telangana Rashtra Samithi	Dasyam Vinay Bhasker	Telangana Rashtra Samithi

=== Chhattisgarh ===
S.No	Date	Constituency	MLA before election	Party before election	Elected MLA	Party after election
05	01 October 2010	Bhatgaon	Ravi Shankar Tripathi	Bharatiya Janata Party	Rajni Ravishankar Tripathi	Bharatiya Janata Party

=== Goa ===
S.No	Date	Constituency	MLA before election	Party before election	Elected MLA	Party after election
19	18 October 2010	Valpoi	Vishwajit Rane	Independent politician	Vishwajit Rane	Indian National Congress

=== Gujarat ===
S.No	Date	Constituency	MLA before election	Party before election	Elected MLA	Party after election
10	20 January 2010	Chotila	Popatbhai Jinjariya	Indian National Congress	Bharat Khorani	Bharatiya Janata Party
128	13 September 2010	Kathlal	Gautambhai Jhala	Indian National Congress	Kanubhai Dabhi	Bharatiya Janata Party

=== Haryana ===
S.No	Date	Constituency	MLA before election	Party before election	Elected MLA	Party after election
46	20 January 2010	Ellenabad	Om Prakash Chautala	Indian National Lok Dal	Abhay Singh Chautala	Indian National Lok Dal

=== Karnataka ===
S.No	Date	Constituency	MLA before election	Party before election	Elected MLA	Party after election
44	13 September 2010	Gulbarga Dakshin	Chandrashekhar Patil Revoor	Bharatiya Janata Party	Aruna C. Patil Revoor	Janata Dal
127	13 September 2010	Kadur	K. M. Krishnamurthy	Indian National Congress	Y. C. Vishwanath	Bharatiya Janata Party

=== Maharashtra ===
S.No	Date	Constituency	MLA before election	Party before election	Elected MLA	Party after election
137	20 January 2010	Bhiwandi East	Abu Azmi	Samajwadi Party	Rupesh Mhatre	Shiv Sena

=== Tamil Nadu ===
S.No	Date	Constituency	MLA before election	Party before election	Elected MLA	Party after election
83	27 March 2010	Pennagaram	P. N. Periannan	Dravida Munnetra Kazhagam	P. N. P. Inbasekharan	Dravida Munnetra Kazhagam

=== Uttar Pradesh ===
S.No	Date	Constituency	MLA before election	Party before election	Elected MLA	Party after election
154	03 June 2010	Domariyaganj	Taufique Ahmad	Bahujan Samaj Party	Khatoon Taufique	Bahujan Samaj Party
54	20 November 2011	Lakhimpur	Kaushal Kishore	Samajwadi Party	Utkarsh Verma	Samajwadi Party
333	20 November 2011	Nidhauli Kalan	Anil Kumar Singh Yadav	Samajwadi Party	Amit Gaurav	Samajwadi Party

=== West Bengal ===
S.No	Date	Constituency	MLA before election	Party before election	Elected MLA	Party after election
264	05 July 2010	Durgapur I	Mrinal Banerjee	Communist Party of India	Archana Bhattacharyya	Communist Party of India

== See also ==
- S. Y. Quraishi
