= Awadam =

- Village
- Location in Telangana, India Awadam (India)
- Coordinates: 18.9556284°N 79.6037793°E
- Country: India
- State: Telangana
- District: Mancherial
- Talukas: Nennal

Population (2011)
  - Total: 2,089

Languages
  - Official: Telugu
- Time zone: UTC+5:30 (IST)
- PIN: 504204
- Vehicle registration: TG 01

Awadam or Avadam is a village in Mancherial district of the Indian state of Telangana. It is located in Nennal mandal. It falls under Bellampalli (Assembly constituency) and Peddapalle (Lok Sabha constituency).

== Demographics ==
As of 2011 census of India, Awadam has a population of 2,089. Males constitute 51% of the total population and females 49%.

The majority of people practice Hinduism, followed by Islam and Christianity. Languages spoken include Telugu, followed by Hindi and English.

== Transport ==
=== Road ===
Awadam is well connected by road to nearby towns like Mancherial, Mandamarri and Bellampalle. State run TSRTC buses run from Mancherial via Mandamarri. NH 16 (Nizamabad to Jagdalpur) passes 16 km away from Awadam at Bheemaram. Rajeev Rahadari Hyderabad-Karimnagar-Ramagundam(Godavarikhani) road is 32 km away from Awadam, which is the shortest route to reach Hyderabad via Godavarikhani, Karimnagar, Siddipet. Mamidi gattu, chittapur, gangaram, kazipally are neighbouring villages of Awadam.

=== Rail ===
Nearby railway station is Mancherial, which is located on north–south railway route from Delhi to Chennai. It comes under South Central Railways.

=== Air ===
The nearest international airport is Rajiv Gandhi International Airport in Hyderabad, located 270 km away.

== Education ==
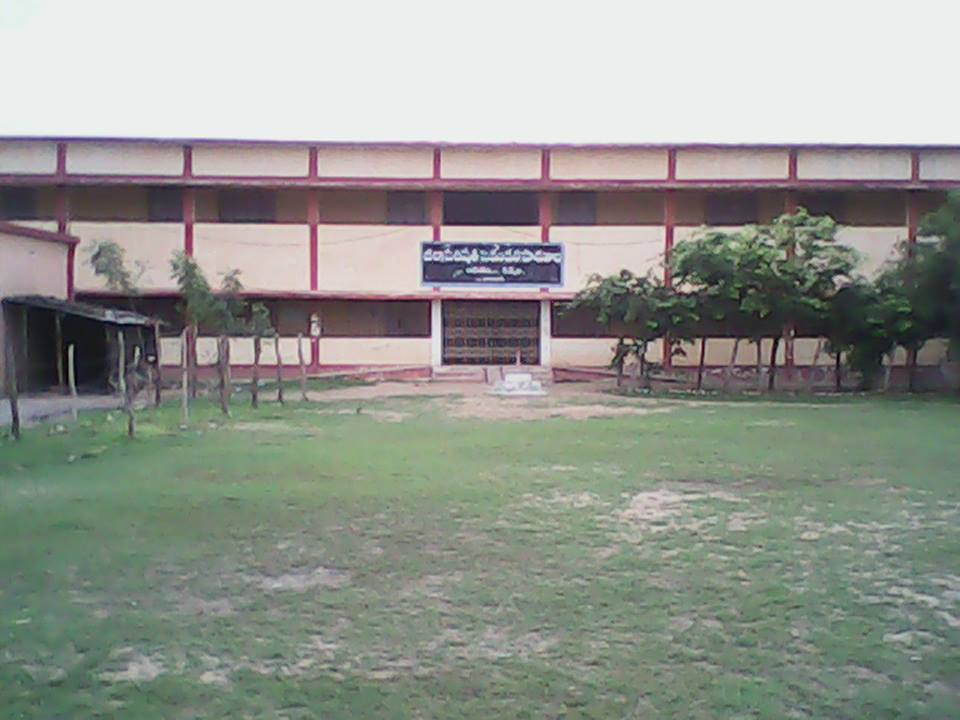
ZPHS Awadam main Building

Zilla Parishad High School is secondary education school in Awadam. This school was established in 1986. It is a co-educational institute. It serves for the classes from 6th to 10th. The primary language of education is Telugu, but now newly English medium is also introduced according to the Government of Telangana plans to introduce English medium in Government schools of Telangana.

This school is the main education source for surrounding villages like Gangaram, Mamidigattu, Chittapur, Jhandavenkatapur, Chinavenkatapur, Kottur, Pottiyal etc. This school also has a playground.

== Politics ==
- durgam pavani– Sarpanch, Congress
- salman pasha youth leader

== Awadam Song ==
- https://www.youtube.com/watch?v=Doh4u5FtsYE
