= Mancherial =

- City
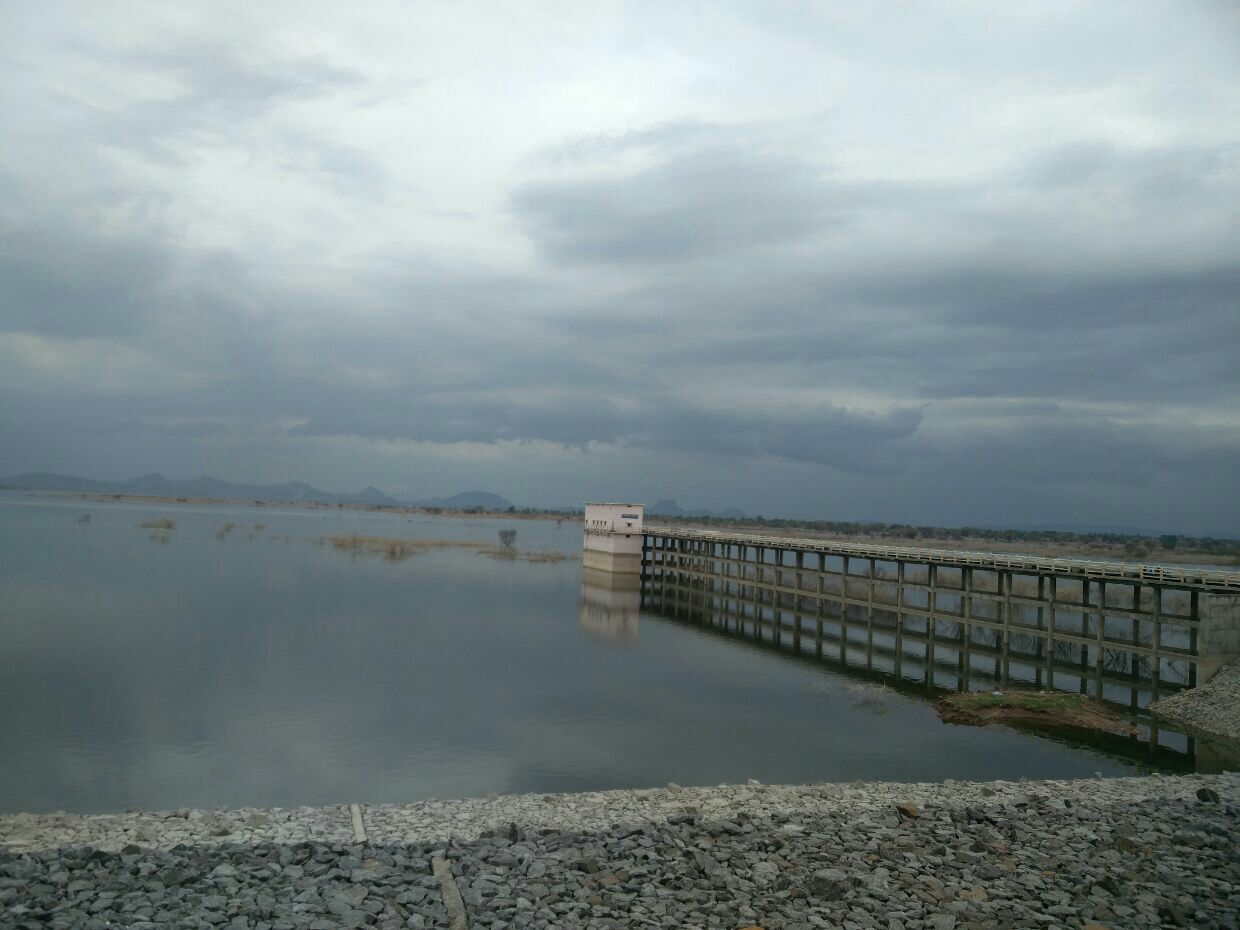
- Yellampalli project located in Ramagundam Rural but borders Mulkalla village

- Mancherial (Telangana) Mancherial (India)
- Coordinates: 18°52′17.0″N 79°26′39.5″E
- Country: India
- State: Telangana
- District: Mancherial
- Established: 1908

Government
  - Type: Municipal corporation
  - Body: Mancherial Municipal Corporation
  - Mayor: Dharni Madhukar (INC)
  - MLA: Sri Kokkirala Premsagar Rao
  - MP: Vamsi Krishna Gaddam(INC)
  - Commissioner of Police: Ambar Kishor Jha(IPS)(Ramagundam Police Commissionerate)

Area
  - City: 155.93 km^{2} (60.20 sq mi)
  - Rank: 6th rank
- Elevation: 173 m (568 ft)

Population (2011)
  - City: 228,450
  - Rank: 6th in(Telangana)
  - Density: 1,465.1/km^{2} (3,794.5/sq mi)
  - Urban: MUDA
- Demonym: Mancherialian

Languages
  - Official Language: Telugu, Hindi
- Time zone: UTC+5:30 (IST)
- PIN1: 504208
- PIN2: 504302
- Telephone code: +91-08736
- ISO 3166 code: IN-TG
- Vehicle registration: TG-19
- Sex ratio: 993 ♀/♂
- Literacy rate: 75.71%
- Assembly constituency: Mancherial
- Lok Sabha constituency: Peddapalli
- Major highways: Rajiv Rahadari; NH 63; NH 363
- Planning agency: Mancherial Urban Development Authority (MUDA)
- Website: mancherialmunicipality.telangana.gov.in

Mancherial, natively spelt as Mancheryala, is a city and headquarters of the Mancherial district of the Indian state of Telangana. It is both the district and administrative headquarters of Mancherial mandal in the Mancherial revenue division. It is located on the north banks of the Godavari River. It is located about 244 kilometres (152 mi) from the state capital, Hyderabad, 84 kilometres (52 mi) from Karimnagar, 138 kilometres (86 mi) from Nirmal and 155 kilometres (96 mi) from Adilabad.

== History ==
Historically, it was part of Adilabad District, but now it is a separate district by itself. It was, until as recently as less than a hundred years ago, rich in forest resources and many small scale & large scale industries but was of little economic and political importance. Gonds mainly depended on farming for their livelihoods. After the Singareni Collieries Company coal mines were established in the region, it became industrialised. During the 1970s, an Industrial training institute was opened there.

== Demographics ==
Historical population
Year	Pop.	±%
1951	8,997	—
1961	13,822	+53.6%
1971	19,808	+43.3%
1981	32,478	+64.0%
1991	52,657	+62.1%
2001	118,195	+124.5%
2011	228,450	+93.3%

Religion in Mancherial(2011)
Hinduism	92.55%
Islam	5.58%
Christianity	0.98%
Other or not stated	0.89%

Languages of Mancherial (2011)
1. Telugu (92.4%)
2. Urdu (5.13%)
3. Others (2.60%)

As of the 2011 census of India, Mancherial has a population of 228,450. Males constitute 51% of the total population and females 49%. Mancherial has an average literacy rate of 75.71%, higher than the national average: male literacy is 83.16%, and female literacy is 67.92%. In Mancherial, 8% of the population is under 6 years of age.

The majority of people in the area practice Hinduism, followed by Islam and Christianity. Telugu is the most widely spoken language.

== Civic Governance ==
The Mancherial Municipality was originally constituted as a third-grade municipality in 1952 and was upgraded to first-grade municipality status in 2003 to accommodate the growing population and urban needs. On January 4, 2025, the Government of Telangana issued a gazette notification elevating it to Municipal Corporation status by merging the existing Mancherial Municipality and Naspur Municipality with eight surrounding gram panchayats from Hajipur mandal: Pochampad, Gudipet, Narsingapur, Namnur, Chandanagar, Mulkala, Kothapalli, and Vempalli. This merger expanded the urban area to support infrastructure development and administrative efficiency. The inaugural elections for the Mancherial Municipal Corporation were held in February 2026.

== Climate ==
Mancherial is located at an elevation of 149.07 meters (489.07 feet) above sea level, Mancherial has a Tropical wet and dry or savanna climate (Classification: Aw). The district's yearly temperature is 30.69 °C (87.24 °F) and it is 4.72% higher than India's averages. Mancherial typically receives about 131.78 millimeters (5.19 inches) of precipitation and has 117.83 rainy days (32.28% of the time) annually.

Climate data for Climate for Mancherial(1991–2020, extremes 1982–2020)
Month	Jan	Feb	Mar	Apr	May	Jun	Jul	Aug	Sep	Oct	Nov	Dec	Year
Record high °C (°F)	37.2 (99.0)	38.5 (101.3)	42.8 (109.0)	46.6 (115.9)	47.3 (117.1)	46.8 (116.2)	39.7 (103.5)	38.7 (101.7)	39.1 (102.4)	38.3 (100.9)	38.3 (100.9)	36 (97)	47.3 (117.1)
Mean daily maximum °C (°F)	29.2 (84.6)	32.8 (91.0)	36.7 (98.1)	40.4 (104.7)	42.5 (108.5)	37.2 (99.0)	31.9 (89.4)	30.6 (87.1)	32.3 (90.1)	32.5 (90.5)	30.9 (87.6)	29.3 (84.7)	33.6 (92.5)
Mean daily minimum °C (°F)	13.2 (55.8)	16.2 (61.2)	20.7 (69.3)	24.8 (76.6)	28.3 (82.9)	26.5 (79.7)	24.3 (75.7)	24.0 (75.2)	23.4 (74.1)	20.4 (68.7)	15.8 (60.4)	12.7 (54.9)	20.4 (68.7)
Record low °C (°F)	4.5 (40.1)	6.4 (43.5)	10.7 (51.3)	14.6 (58.3)	20.1 (68.2)	18.2 (64.8)	18.8 (65.8)	18.2 (64.8)	12.1 (53.8)	10.2 (50.4)	6.8 (44.2)	1.9 (35.4)	1.9 (35.4)
Average rainfall mm (inches)	22.3 (0.88)	4.7 (0.19)	24.7 (0.97)	11.6 (0.46)	14.4 (0.57)	131.1 (5.16)	305.1 (12.01)	231.1 (9.10)	135.7 (5.34)	86.6 (3.41)	8.2 (0.32)	1.3 (0.05)	976.9 (38.46)
Average rainy days	0.9	0.5	1.7	1.1	1.4	6.6	13.7	10.4	7.2	2.6	0.6	0.1	46.9
Average relative humidity (%) (at 17:30 IST)	51	46	42	37	31	49	71	75	70	67	59	57	55
Source 1: India Meteorological Department
Source 2: NOAA

== Notable Individuals ==
=== Politics ===
- Kokkirala Premsagar Rao - MLA, Indian National Congress
- Nadipelli Diwakar Rao MLA, Telangana Rashtra Samithi

== Education ==
List of colleges in Mancherial:

- Government Medical College, Mancherial.
- Government Degree college, Mancherial.
- Government Industrial Training Institute (ITI) College Mancherial.
- Government Junior College, Mancherial Mancherial.
- Singareni Polytechnic College Mancherial.

== Tourism ==
- Gandhari khilla, a hill fort
- Sripada Yellampalli Project
- Gadpur Jungle Safari

== Transport ==
Mancherial is well connected with all types of transport facilities, the major ones are Road and Rail.

=== Road ===
Telangana State Road Transport Corporation TGSRTC has its bus depot in Mancherial connecting transportation facility to the citizens to every village and city of Mancherial district.

A new National highway is being constructed from Mancherial to Chandrapur. Also another new National highway is sanctioned from Jaipur Mandal to Warangal via Manthani and Bhupalpally. This Highway is named as Green Industrial corridor by NHAI.

The following are the major roads passing through the city:

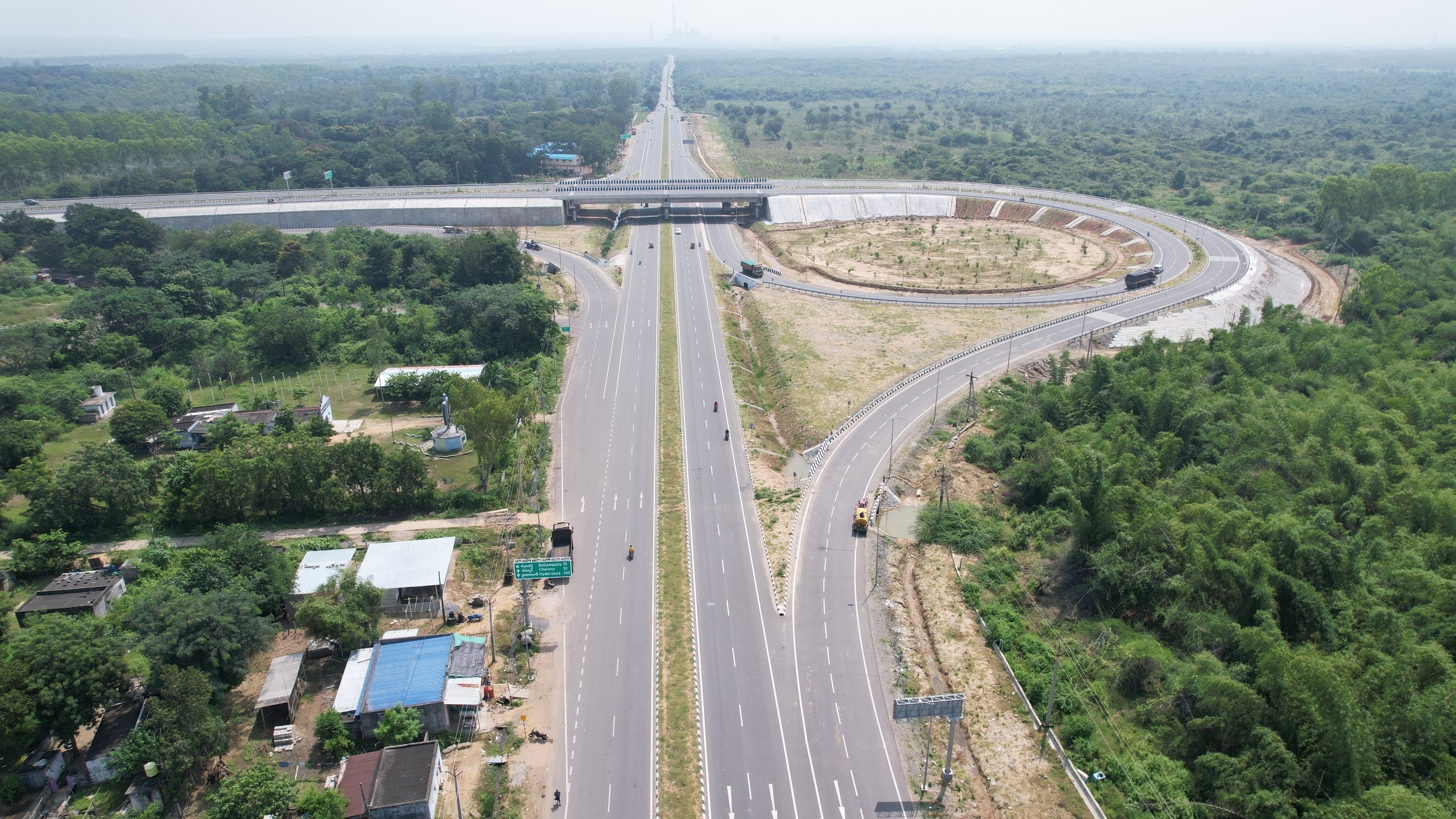
NH363 Mncl Interchange

- Rajiv Rahadari
- National Highway 63 - Jagdalpur to yedashi via renapur latur bodhan nizamabad passes through Mancherial.
- National Highway 363

=== Rail ===
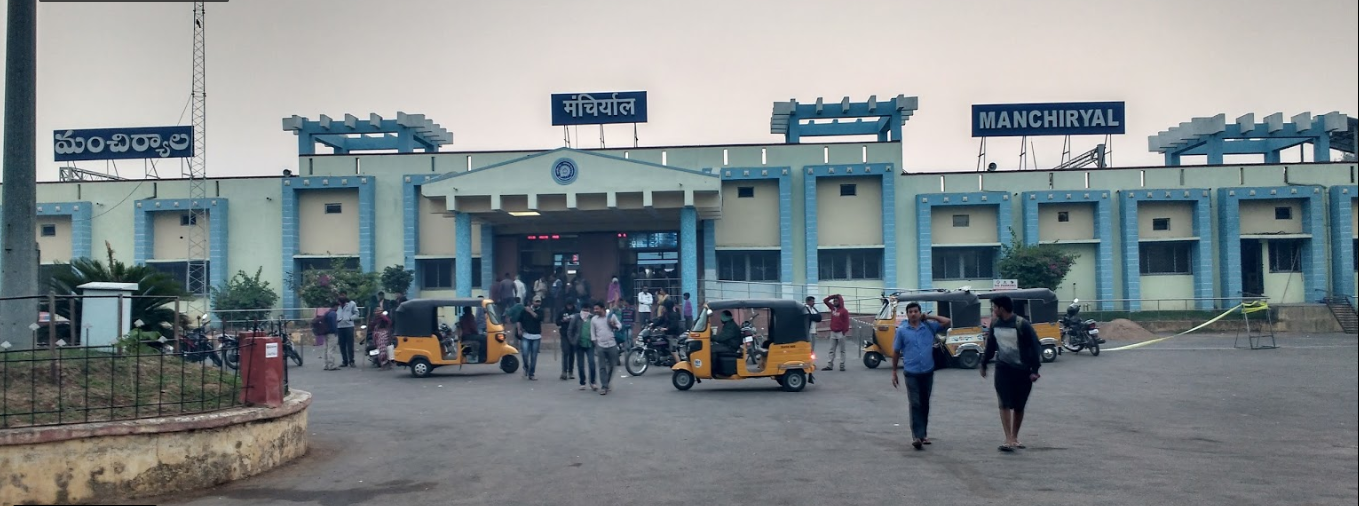
Mancherial railway station entrance

Mancherial railway station is the busiest station in Kazipet–Balharshah section Secunderabad railway division, after it is one among the five 'A' category stations of SC division(NSG 3).

Mancherial is located on the longest railway line, which is called the Grand Trunk line (New Delhi–Chennai). It is well connected by rail from various towns/cities in India. It comes under South Central Railways. With the completion of the Kazipet–Balharshah link in 1929, Chennai was directly linked to Delhi.

It has 3 platforms. It is a good potential station to stop due its population as well as proximity to other major towns like Mandamarri (14 km), Luxettipet (26 km), Ramakrishnapur (8 km), Chennur (40 km), Jaipur Power Plant (17 km).

=== Air ===
The closest airport is Hyderabad International Airport.
