= Narsingapur =

Narsingapur is a village in Mancherial Mandal in Mancherial district in the state of Telangana in India.
