= Durgam Chinnaiah =

Indian politician and legislator

Member of Legislative Assembly, Telangana
- In office 2014–2023
- Preceded by: Assembly established
- Succeeded by: Gaddam Vinod Kumar
- Constituency: Bellampalli

Personal details
- Born: Adilabad, India
- Party: Telangana Rashtra Samithi

Durgam Chinnaiah is an Indian politician and a legislator of Telangana Legislature. He won from Bellampalli on Telangana Rashtra Samithi ticket.
