= Venkatesh Netha Borlakunta =

Indian politician

Member of parliament, Lok Sabha
- In office 2019–2024
- Preceded by: Balka Suman
- Succeeded by: Vamsi Krishna Gaddam
- Constituency: Peddapalle

Personal details
- Born: Thimmapur
- Party: BJP
- Other political affiliations: INC, BRS

Venkatesh Netha Borlakunta is an Indian politician and a member of parliament to the 17th Lok Sabha from Peddapalle Lok Sabha constituency, Telangana. He won the 2019 Indian general election being an Bharat Rashtra Samithi candidate. He was studied in Osmania University. Before elections he resigned for his job. He was also a CPS employee and also fought against CPS, leader in CPSTEATS, which was fighting against the CPS system.

Venkatesh Netha contested the 2018 Assembly elections on Congress ticket and had lost and later he joined BRS ahead of 2019 Lok Sabha elections and contested from Peddapalli parliament and elected as Loksabha Member. He joined the Congress party in the presence of All India Congress Committee general secretary K. C. Venugopal in New Delhi on 6 February 2024.

Venkatesh Neta left congress and joined BJP in the presence of Union Tourism Minister G Kishan Reddy in Hyderabad on 29 April 2024.
