= Vamsi Krishna Gaddam =

Indian politician

Member of Parliament, Lok Sabha
- Incumbent
- Assumed office 2024
- Preceded by: Venkatesh Netha Borlakunta
- Constituency: Peddapalli

Personal details
- Born: 10 February 1989 (age 37) Hyderabad
- Party: Indian National Congress
- Spouse: Roshni Gaddam
- Parent(s): Gaddam Vivekanand, Dr. Saroja Gaddam
- Relatives: Gaddam Venkatswamy (Grand Father); Gaddam Vinod Kumar (Uncle)
- Nickname: Vamsi

Gaddam Vamsi Krishna (born 1989) is an Indian politician and the elected candidate for Lok Sabha from Peddapalli Lok Sabha constituency. He is a member of the Indian National Congress, and he is the son of G. Vivekanand.

== Electoral History ==
Year	Constituency	Party	Votes	%	Opponent	Party	Votes	%	Result	Margin	%
2024	Peddapalli	INC	4,75,587	43.43	Srinivas Gomase	BJP	3,44,223	31.43	Won	+1,31,364	+12.00

== Leadership ==
Vamsi Krishna Gaddam, as Joint Managing Director of Visaka Industries, has played a role in enhancing the company’s growth, expanding its turnover and profitability. Under his leadership, Visaka Industries launched many sustainable products such as Atum, a solar roof, and Vnext Fibre Cement Boards, establishing the company’s reputation in green innovations.

== Generations in politics ==
Vamsi Krishna Gaddam belongs to a prominent political family deeply rooted in the Peddapalli constituency of Telangana. His grandfather, G. Venkataswamy and father G. Vivekanand, have both held significant political positions, and Vamsi has continued their legacy by actively engaging in political campaigns, emphasizing youth involvement and community upliftment.

== Entrepreneurial impact ==
Vamsi Krishna Gaddam’s entrepreneurial ventures include launching Atumobile, an electric bike company that emphasizes sustainability while creating employment opportunities. His entry into politics combines social entrepreneurship with a focus on green innovations, making him a strong advocate for eco-friendly solutions.

== Construction industry ==
Vamsi Krishna Gaddam has been associated with initiatives in design and sustainability through products such as Atum solar roofing and Vnext fibre cement boards.These efforts have contributed to Visaka Industries' activities in the green building sector. His role in the company has been linked to the development and promotion of eco-friendly construction materials.
