= Kadur Assembly constituency =

Legislative Assembly constituency in Karnataka State, India

Coordinates: 13.55°N 76.01°E

Kadur
- Constituency No. 127 for the Karnataka Legislative Assembly

Constituency details
- Country: India
- Region: South India
- State: Karnataka
- Division: Mysore
- District: Chikmagalur
- Lok Sabha constituency: Hassan
- Established: 1951
- Total electors: 206,584
- Reservation: None

Member of Legislative Assembly
- 16th Karnataka Legislative Assembly
- Incumbent K. S. Anand
- Party: INC
- Alliance: INDIA
- Elected year: 2023
- Preceded by: K. S. Prakash

Kadur Assembly constituency is one of the 224 Legislative Assembly constituencies of Karnataka in India.

It is part of Chikmagalur district.

== Members of the Legislative Assembly ==
Election	Member	Party
1952	Y. M. Chandrasekaraiah	Indian National Congress
1957	D. H. Rudrappa	Indian National Congress
1962	G. Marulappa	Independent politician
1967	K. M. Thammaiah	Praja Socialist Party
1972	K. R. Honnappa	Indian National Congress
1978	K. M. Thammaiah	Janata Party
1983	N. K. Hutchappa	Indian National Congress
1985	P. B. Onkaramurthy	Independent politician
1989	M. Veerabhadrappa	Indian National Congress
1994	K. M. Krishnamurthy	Janata Dal
1999	K. M. Krishnamurthy	Janata Dal
2004	K. M. Krishnamurthy	Janata Dal
2008	K. M. Krishnamurthy	Indian National Congress
2010 By-election	Dr. Vishwanatha. Y. C	Bharatiya Janata Party
2013	Y. S. V. Datta	Janata Dal
2018	K. S. Prakash	Bharatiya Janata Party
2023	K. S. Anand	Indian National Congress

== Election results ==
=== Assembly Election 2023 ===
2023 Karnataka Legislative Assembly election : Kadur
Party	Candidate	Votes	%	±%
INC	K. S. Anand	75,482	44.60%	▲15.70
BJP	Belli Prakash	63,480	37.51%	▼1.46
JD(S)	Y. S. V. Datta	26,838	15.86%	▼13.48
NOTA	None of the above	928	0.55%	▼0.12
Margin of victory		12,002	7.09%	▼2.54
Turnout		170,226	82.40%	▲3.24
Total valid votes		169,248		
Registered electors		206,584		▲2.31
INC gain from BJP		Swing	▲5.63	

=== Assembly Election 2018 ===
2018 Karnataka Legislative Assembly election : Kadur
Party	Candidate	Votes	%	±%
BJP	K. S. Prakash	62,232	38.97%	▲33.17
JD(S)	Y. S. V. Datta	46,860	29.34%	▼13.40
INC	K. S. Anand	46,142	28.90%	▲13.51
NOTA	None of the above	1,075	0.67%	New
Margin of victory		15,372	9.63%	▼16.75
Turnout		159,844	79.16%	▲1.64
Total valid votes		159,688		
Registered electors		201,915		▲10.40
BJP gain from JD(S)		Swing	▼3.77	

=== Assembly Election 2013 ===
2013 Karnataka Legislative Assembly election : Kadur
Party	Candidate	Votes	%	±%
JD(S)	Y. S. V. Datta	68,733	42.74%	▲10.01
KJP	Belli Prakash	26,300	16.35%	New
INC	K. B. Mallikarjuna	24,745	15.39%	▼8.30
BJP	Birur Devaraj	9,332	5.80%	▼37.78
BSRCP	K. M. Kemparaju	7,309	4.54%	New
LSP	B. M. Madhu	2,179	1.35%	New
Independent	K. H. Nagaraju	1,829	1.14%	New
Margin of victory		42,433	26.38%	▲15.53
Turnout		141,787	77.52%	▲5.55
Total valid votes		160,826		
Registered electors		182,898		▲2.82
JD(S) gain from BJP		Swing	▼0.84	

=== Assembly By-election 2010 ===
2010 Karnataka Legislative Assembly by-election : Kadur
Party	Candidate	Votes	%	±%
BJP	Dr. Vishwanatha. Y. C	55,796	43.58%	▲17.57
JD(S)	Y. S. V. Datta	41,899	32.73%	▲3.22
INC	K. M. Kemparaju	30,330	23.69%	▼8.61
Margin of victory		13,897	10.85%	▲8.05
Turnout		128,028	71.97%	▲1.50
Total valid votes		128,025		
Registered electors		177,879		▲2.66
BJP gain from INC		Swing	▲11.28	

=== Assembly Election 2008 ===
2008 Karnataka Legislative Assembly election : Kadur
Party	Candidate	Votes	%	±%
INC	K. M. Krishnamurthy	39,411	32.30%	▼3.50
JD(S)	Y. S. V. Datta	36,000	29.51%	▼13.51
BJP	Dr. Vishwanatha. Y. C	31,739	26.01%	▲7.35
Independent	Birur Devaraj	5,632	4.62%	New
BSP	Kunkanadu Shivakumara	4,078	3.34%	New
Independent	Mariyappa	1,898	1.56%	New
Swarna Yuga Party	G. E. Hemanth Kumar	1,894	1.55%	New
SKP	S. G. Jagadeesha	1,352	1.11%	New
Margin of victory		3,411	2.80%	▼4.42
Turnout		122,110	70.47%	▼1.93
Total valid votes		122,004		
Registered electors		173,274		▲24.25
INC gain from JD(S)		Swing	▼10.72	

=== Assembly Election 2004 ===
2004 Karnataka Legislative Assembly election : Kadur
Party	Candidate	Votes	%	±%
JD(S)	K. M. Krishnamurthy	43,433	43.02%	▲7.34
INC	Marulasiddappa. M	36,144	35.80%	▲19.14
BJP	Kariyappa. M. M	18,841	18.66%	▲2.26
JP	Anuradha	2,544	2.52%	New
Margin of victory		7,289	7.22%	▲1.73
Turnout		100,969	72.40%	▼0.39
Total valid votes		100,962		
Registered electors		139,459		▲7.51
JD(S) hold		Swing	▲7.34	

=== Assembly Election 1999 ===
1999 Karnataka Legislative Assembly election : Kadur
Party	Candidate	Votes	%	±%
JD(S)	K. M. Krishnamurthy	31,240	35.68%	New
Independent	Marulasiddappa. M	26,435	30.19%	New
INC	K. A. Shanthappa	14,590	16.66%	▼11.05
BJP	Dr. Vishwanatha. Y. C	14,360	16.40%	▲10.82
JD(U)	K. M. Thammaiah	604	0.69%	New
Margin of victory		4,805	5.49%	▼29.49
Turnout		94,426	72.79%	▼2.22
Total valid votes		87,564		
Rejected ballots		6,862	7.27%	▲5.78
Registered electors		129,719		▲7.28
JD(S) gain from JD		Swing	▼27.02	

=== Assembly Election 1994 ===
1994 Karnataka Legislative Assembly election : Kadur
Party	Candidate	Votes	%	±%
JD	K. M. Krishnamurthy	56,018	62.70%	▲26.51
INC	M. Veerabhadrappa	24,762	27.71%	▼20.78
BJP	H. V. Girish	4,989	5.58%	New
INC	S. S. Malleshappa	1,961	2.19%	New
Independent	J. Deveeramma	669	0.75%	New
Margin of victory		31,256	34.98%	▲22.68
Turnout		90,698	75.01%	▼0.69
Total valid votes		89,347		
Rejected ballots		1,351	1.49%	▼4.58
Registered electors		120,912		▲8.31
JD gain from INC		Swing	▲14.21	

=== Assembly Election 1989 ===
1989 Karnataka Legislative Assembly election : Kadur
Party	Candidate	Votes	%	±%
INC	M. Veerabhadrappa	38,494	48.49%	▲29.68
JD	K. M. Krishnamurthy	28,729	36.19%	New
JP	B. Lokanath	7,472	9.41%	New
Independent	J. A. Nagaraja	1,659	2.09%	New
Independent	G. V. Manjunathaswamy	1,108	1.40%	New
Independent	Krishnoji Rao	519	0.65%	New
Margin of victory		9,765	12.30%	▲12.11
Turnout		84,512	75.70%	▼2.94
Total valid votes		79,384		
Rejected ballots		5,128	6.07%	▲4.63
Registered electors		111,640		▲35.36
INC gain from Independent		Swing	▲8.22	

=== Assembly Election 1985 ===
1985 Karnataka Legislative Assembly election : Kadur
Party	Candidate	Votes	%	±%
Independent	P. B. Onkaramurthy	25,745	40.27%	New
JP	K. M. Krishnamurthy	25,622	40.08%	▲23.59
INC	N. K. Hutchappa	12,027	18.81%	▼9.71
Margin of victory		123	0.19%	▼2.92
Turnout		64,861	78.64%	▲7.12
Total valid votes		63,925		
Rejected ballots		936	1.44%	▼1.03
Registered electors		82,478		▲7.79
Independent gain from INC		Swing	▲11.75	

=== Assembly Election 1983 ===
1983 Karnataka Legislative Assembly election : Kadur
Party	Candidate	Votes	%	±%
INC	N. K. Hutchappa	15,223	28.52%	▲9.25
Independent	K. M. Krishnamurthy	13,563	25.41%	New
Independent	P. B. Onkaramurthy	13,397	25.10%	New
JP	S. S. Malleshappa	8,802	16.49%	▼19.51
BJP	K. T. Mudiyappa	1,054	1.97%	New
Independent	Habeebullakhan	598	1.12%	New
Independent	Dhanapala Naika	538	1.01%	New
Margin of victory		1,660	3.11%	▼7.17
Turnout		54,724	71.52%	▼4.90
Total valid votes		53,372		
Rejected ballots		1,352	2.47%	▼0.28
Registered electors		76,515		▲6.50
INC gain from JP		Swing	▼7.48	

=== Assembly Election 1978 ===
1978 Karnataka Legislative Assembly election : Kadur
Party	Candidate	Votes	%	±%
JP	K. M. Thammaiah	19,223	36.00%	New
INC(I)	K. T. Muddiyappa	13,732	25.72%	New
INC	M. Veerabhadrappa	10,291	19.27%	▼24.07
Independent	B. R. Devaraj	4,187	7.84%	New
Independent	B. Marulappa	3,642	6.82%	New
Independent	C. Nanjappa	1,270	2.38%	New
Independent	K. Basavarajappa	1,046	1.96%	New
Margin of victory		5,491	10.28%	▼4.84
Turnout		54,903	76.42%	▲15.56
Total valid votes		53,391		
Rejected ballots		1,512	2.75%	▲2.75
Registered electors		71,842		▲17.71
JP gain from INC		Swing	▼7.34	

=== Assembly Election 1972 ===
1972 Mysore State Legislative Assembly election : Kadur
Party	Candidate	Votes	%	±%
INC	K. R. Honnappa	15,558	43.34%	▲2.61
Independent	K. M. Thammaiah	10,131	28.22%	New
INC(O)	K. C. Sreekantappa	7,994	22.27%	New
SWA	T. S. Shamu	1,781	4.96%	New
SSP	Y. Rama Chandra Shetty	436	1.21%	New
Margin of victory		5,427	15.12%	▼3.43
Turnout		37,146	60.86%	▼4.84
Total valid votes		35,900		
Registered electors		61,035		▲19.25
INC gain from PSP		Swing	▼15.93	

=== Assembly Election 1967 ===
1967 Mysore State Legislative Assembly election : Kadur
Party	Candidate	Votes	%	±%
PSP	K. M. Thammaiah	18,663	59.27%	New
INC	Y. M. Gangadharappa	12,823	40.73%	▲8.52
Margin of victory		5,840	18.55%	▼17.02
Turnout		33,626	65.70%	▲6.74
Total valid votes		31,486		
Registered electors		51,181		▼12.95
PSP gain from Independent		Swing	▼8.52	

=== Assembly Election 1962 ===
1962 Mysore State Legislative Assembly election : Kadur
Party	Candidate	Votes	%	±%
Independent	G. Marulappa	21,736	67.79%	New
INC	D. H. Rudrappa	10,329	32.21%	▼4.85
Margin of victory		11,407	35.57%	▲30.38
Turnout		34,664	58.96%	▲0.11
Total valid votes		32,065		
Registered electors		58,796		▲16.74
Independent gain from INC		Swing	▲30.73	

=== Assembly Election 1957 ===
1957 Mysore State Legislative Assembly election : Kadur
Party	Candidate	Votes	%	±%
INC	D. H. Rudrappa	10,986	37.06%	▼7.74
PSP	G. Marulappa	9,448	31.87%	New
Independent	K. M. Thammaiah	9,207	31.06%	New
Margin of victory		1,538	5.19%	▼16.09
Turnout		29,641	58.85%	▼3.77
Total valid votes		29,641		
Registered electors		50,367		▲44.20
INC hold		Swing	▼7.74	

=== Assembly Election 1952 ===
1952 Mysore State Legislative Assembly election : Kadur
Party	Candidate	Votes	%	±%
INC	Y. M. Chandrasekaraiah	9,799	44.80%	New
Independent	K. H. Mudiyappa	5,144	23.52%	New
KMPP	G. Marulappa	3,029	13.85%	New
Independent	U. S. Shivalinga Murthy	1,990	9.10%	New
Independent	K. Hanumantahaiah	1,912	8.74%	New
Margin of victory		4,655	21.28%	
Turnout		21,874	62.62%	
Total valid votes		21,874		
Registered electors		34,929		
INC win (new seat)				

== See also ==
- List of constituencies of the Karnataka Legislative Assembly
- Chikmagalur district
