= Chellamalla Suguna Kumari =

Indian politician (born 1955)

Member of parliament
- Preceded by: G. Venkat Swamy
- Succeeded by: G. Venkat Swamy
- Constituency: Peddapalli

Personal details
- Born: 25 July 1955 (age 70) Hyderabad, Telangana, India
- Party: Telugu Desam Party
- Spouse: Rajendra Prasad Marpak (m. 1981)
- Children: 2

Chellamalla Suguna Kumari (born 25 July 1955) is an Indian parliamentarian from Hyderabad, Telangana.

== Personal life ==
Chellamalla was born in Hyderabad, Andhra Pradesh in 1955. Her father is C. Pochaiah. She successfully completed her M.B., B.S., M.D., D.G.O. and D. Ch. at Osmania Medical College and practises medicine. She is also involved in social work.

She married Dr. M. Rajendra Prasad in 1981. They have two sons.

== Political career ==
Kumari was elected to the 12th Lok Sabha from Peddapalli (Lok Sabha constituency) in 1998 as a member of Telugu Desam Party. She was elected for the second term from the same constituency to 13th Lok Sabha in 2004.

She has been a member of various Parliamentary committees on Petroleum and Chemicals, on Government Assurances and Ministry of Health and Family Welfare.
