= K. S. Anand =

Indian politician (born 1979)

- Born: 1979 (age 46–47)
- Occupation: Politician

K. S. Anand (born 1979) is an Indian politician from Kadur, Chikmagalur district, Karnataka. He is an MLA from Kadur Assembly constituency in Chikmagalur district. He won the 2023 Karnataka Legislative Assembly election representing Indian National Congress.

His father K G Siddappa is a farmer. He completed his B.Sc. at the Government First Grade College, Kadur, which is affiliated with Kuvempu University, Shankaraghatta, Shimoga district.

Anand won from Kadur Assembly constituency representing Indian National Congress in the 2023 Karnataka Legislative Assembly election. He polled 75,476 votes and defeated his nearest rival, Belli Prakash of Bharatiya Janata Party, by a margin of 12,007 votes.
