= Y. S. V. Datta =

Indian politician

Member of the Legislative Assembly Y. S. V. Datta

MLA from Kadur
- In office 2013–2018

Member of Legislative council
- In office 2006–2012

Personal details
- Born: 24 June 1954 (age 71) Yagati, Kadur Taluk, Chikmagalur District
- Party: Janata Dal (Secular) (2023-Present)
- Other political affiliations: Indian National Congress (Short stint in 2023 before returning to JDS again)
- Spouse: Smt. R. Nirmala
- Children: 1
- Education: B.sc.

Yagati Suryanarayana Venkatesha Datta (born 24 June 1954) is an Indian politician and former member of Karnataka Legislative Assembly from the Kadur seat in 2013 on the Janata Dal (Secular) ticket. Later on 14 January 2023, Datta who had earlier joined INC, reverted to JD(S) on 13 April 2023, in the presence of HD Revanna anda MP Prajwal Revanna. His return was, however, opposed by HD Kumarswamy, who left the matter to Revanna.

== Early life and education ==
Y. Datta was born in Yagati, Kadur taluk, Chikmagalur district. He completed a B.Sc. From National College Basavanagudi in Bangalore in 1973. Before entering politics, he taught mathematics to SSLC, PUC, B.Sc. and engineering students through his tutorial in Bengaluru's Rajajinagar.

== Political career ==
#	From	To	Position
1.	2001	2007	General secretary of Janata Dal (Secular).: Spokesman.
2.	2006	2012	Nominated as Member of legislative council.
3.	2013	2018	Member of the Karnataka Legislative Assembly from Kadur.
