= Government Medical College, Mancherial =

College in Mancherial, Telangana

- Type: Medical Education
- Established: 2022; 4 years ago
- Affiliations: Kaloji Narayana Rao University of Health Sciences
- Superintendent: Dr. P Harish Chandra Reddy
- Principal: Dr. Mohd. Dovood sulamani
- Director: Dr. N. Vani
- Location: Mancherial, Telangana, 504209, India; 18.8762144°N 79.3519635°E
- Campus: Urban
- Website: www.gmcmancherial.org
- Location within Telangana Location within India

Government Medical College is a college in Mancherial, Telangana. It is one of the eight new medical colleges announced, sanctioned and established by the Government of Telangana in June 2021.[1][2] It was inaugurated by K. Chandrashekar Rao, the chief Minister of Telangana on 15 November 2022 and it was functional from academic year 2022–2023.[3][4][5] It is affiliated with the Kaloji Narayana Rao University of Health Sciences.[6]
