= Bellampalli Assembly constituency =

Constituency of the Telangana Legislative Assembly, India

Coordinates: 19.07°N 79.49°E

Bellampalli
- Constituency No. 3 for the Telangana Legislative Assembly
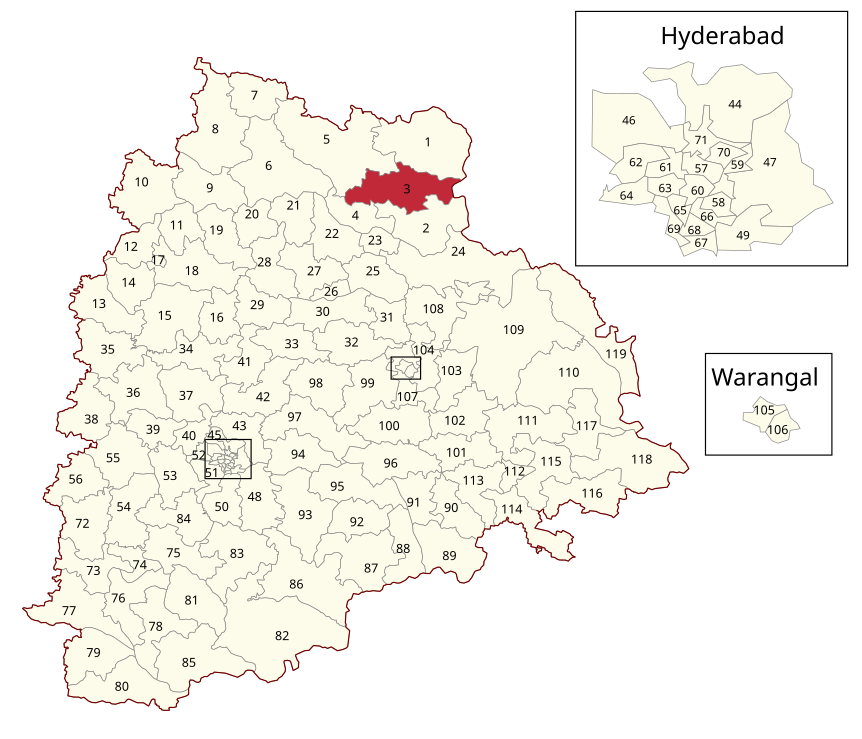
- Location of Bellampalli Assembly constituency within Telangana

Constituency details
- Country: India
- Region: South India
- State: Telangana
- District: Mancherial
- Lok Sabha constituency: Peddapalli
- Established: 2008
- Total electors: 1,37,893
- Reservation: SC

Member of Legislative Assembly
- 3rd Telangana Legislative Assembly
- Incumbent Gaddam Vinod
- Party: INC
- Elected year: 2023

Bellampalli Assembly constituency is one of the 119 constituencies of Telangana Legislative Assembly. It is located in Mancherial district of the state of Telangana. It is one of the seven assembly segments of Peddapalli Lok Sabha constituency.

Gaddam Vinod is the current MLA of the constituency, having won the 2023 Telangana Legislative Assembly election from Indian National Congress.

== Mandals ==
The assembly constituency presently comprises the following Mandals:

Mandal
Bellampalli
Bheemini
Kasipet
Nennal
Vemanpalle
Tandur
Kannepally

== Members of the Legislative Assembly ==
Election	Member	Party
2014	Durgam Chinnaiah	Bharat Rashtra Samithi
2018	Durgam Chinnaiah	Bharat Rashtra Samithi
2023	Gaddam Vinod Kumar	Indian National Congress

== Election results ==
=== Assembly Election 2023 ===
2023 Telangana Legislative Assembly election : Bellampalli
Party	Candidate	Votes	%	±%
INC	Gaddam Vinod Kumar	82,217	57.96%	New
BRS	Durgam Chinnaiah	45,339	31.96%	New
BJP	Amurajula Sridevi	3,812	2.69%	▲0.26
Independent	Dagam Srinivas	2,357	1.66%	New
NOTA	None of the above	2,179	1.54%	▼0.54
Independent	Durge Eshwar	1,512	1.07%	New
RPI	Srinivas Ramtenki	1,289	0.91%	New
BSP	Narsaiah Jadi	1,183	0.83%	▼34.20
Margin of victory		36,878	26.00%	▲16.97
Turnout		141,931	81.80%	▼1.54
Total valid votes		141,863		
Registered electors		173,500		▲13.39
INC gain from BRS		Swing	▲13.91	

=== Assembly Election 2018 ===
2018 Telangana Legislative Assembly election : Bellampalli
Party	Candidate	Votes	%	±%
BRS	Durgam Chinnaiah	55,026	44.05%	▼18.12
BSP	Gaddam Vinod	43,750	35.03%	New
Independent	Kondagurla Veda Prakash	10,684	8.55%	New
CPI	Gunda Mallesh	3,905	3.13%	▼14.78
BJP	Koyyala Emaji	3,031	2.43%	New
NOTA	None of the above	2,598	2.08%	▲1.42
Bahujana Left Party	Sabbani Krishna	1,812	1.45%	New
Independent	Dagam Vishwanath	1,801	1.44%	New
Nava Praja Rajyam Party	Durge Mahendar	1,202	0.96%	New
Independent	Sakinala Narayana	1,120	0.90%	New
Margin of victory		11,276	9.03%	▼35.23
Turnout		127,526	83.34%	▲9.00
Total valid votes		124,903		
Registered electors		153,016		▼4.95
BRS hold		Swing	▼18.12	

=== Assembly Election 2014 ===
2014 Telangana Legislative Assembly election : Bellampalli
Party	Candidate	Votes	%	±%
BRS	Durgam Chinnaiah	73,779	62.17%	New
CPI	Gunda Mallesh	21,251	17.91%	New
TDP	Pati Subhadra	9,167	7.72%	New
Independent	Badikela Sampath Kumar	2,648	2.23%	New
Independent	Jadi Shankaraiah	1,940	1.63%	New
Marxist Communist Party of India (S.S.Srivastava)	Sabbani Krishna	1,390	1.17%	New
Yuvajana Sramika Rythu Congress Party	Erukala Raj Kiran	1,377	1.16%	New
Independent	Chilumula Shankar	1,257	1.06%	New
NOTA	None of the above	781	0.66%	New
Margin of victory		52,528	44.26%	
Turnout		119,672	74.34%	
Total valid votes		118,673		
Registered electors		160,990		
BRS win (new seat)				

== See also ==
- List of constituencies of Telangana Legislative Assembly
