= Balka Suman =

Indian politician

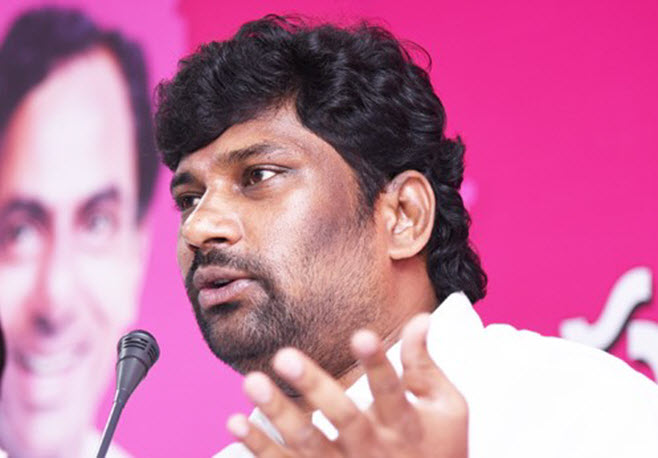
- Suman in 2018

Member of the Telangana Legislative Assembly
- In office December 2018 – December 2023
- Preceded by: Nallala Odelu
- Succeeded by: G Vivek Venkata Swamy
- Constituency: Chennur

Member of Parliament, Lok Sabha
- In office 2014 – December 2018
- Preceded by: Gaddam Vivek Venkatswamy
- Succeeded by: Venkatesh Netha Borlakunta
- Constituency: Peddapalli

Personal details
- Born: 18 October 1983 (age 43) Regunta, Telangana, India
- Party: Bharat Rashtra Samithi
- Education: Osmania University

Balka Suman (born 18 October 1983) is an Indian politician. He is a former Member of Parliament in the 16th Lok Sabha from Peddapalli, Telangana. He won the 2014 Indian general election being a Bharat Rashtra Samithi candidate. He has been elected as an MLA from Chennur constituency in 2018 Telangana Legislative Assembly election.

He lost his election in 2023.

== Early life and education ==
Suman was born on 18 October 1983 in Regunta village of Karimnagar district of Telangana (erstwhile Andhra Pradesh) to Balka Suresh and Muttamma. His father Balka Suresh has been a strong TRS party supporter and Metpally TRS party president during Telangana movement; presently he is the Metpally Market Committee chairman; his mother Muttamma is a housewife. Suman has two siblings, a younger brother and sister. He is married to Rani Alekhya, a TV journalist, in 2013 and the couple has two children – Suhan and Sushan.

Suman completed primary education from Class 1 to 4 at Metpally. From Class 5 to 9, he studied at APSWR (TWSR) School for boys at Pembatla in Jagitial district. From SSC to Intermediate, he studied at APSWR (TSWRJC) at Rukmapur, Choppadandi in Karimnagar district.

After junior college, Balka Suman graduated with B.A. (HEP) Degree from Government Degree College, Korutla, Jagityal district. The year 2003 is significant in Suman's life as it marked his entry to Osmania University to do Master's in English at Secunderabad PG College. Suman joined M.Phil. in Linguistics in 2004 but dropped out of it as he was busy with student politics and separate Telangana movement. In 2008, he registered for PhD. in English at Arts College, Osmania University. His area of research is Native American Literature. He was awarded PhD in May 2023.

== Political career ==
Suman entered politics in 2001 by joining the Bharat Rashtra Samithi, and was a key driving force at Osmania University. He actively participated in Telangana agitation.

He served as O.U campus' student wing (BRSV) president for Bharat Rashtra Samithi (BRS) in 2007 and was made the student wing (BRSV) State President of BRS party in 2010. He is currently the MLA from Chennur constituency.

Between 2009 and 2014, he played an important role in the Telangana movement, supporting the demands of Telangana people.

Member of Legislative Assembly (MLA) member in December 2018 elections at Chennur (SC) Constituency. He won the election with a majority of 28,132 votes against his opponents. However, he lost the election in December 2023 to Congress candidate G Vivek Venkata Swamy.

== Controversies ==
Suman was involved in a physical fight during a TV debate. Balka Suman is also known to be very aggressive in his style of politics. He was involved in fights with various district collectors and senior police officers during his tenure as Member of Parliament, and Member of Legislative Assembly. For the latest municipal elections in 2020, there is a serious allegation that he has threatened and bribed two candidates to withdraw from the elections.
