= Hajipur, Mancherial District =

Hajipur Rajula Adipuram
- Village and Mandal
- Location in Telangana,#India Hajipur (India)
- Coordinates: 18.86247°N 79.30862°E
- Country: India
- State: Telangana
- District: Mancherial

Government
  - Type: Gram Panchayat
  - Body: State government
  - MLA: Kokkirala Premsagar Rao

Population (2011)
  - Total: 1,865
- Demonym: Hajipuri
- Time zone: UTC+5:30 (IST)
- PIN: 504207
- Area code: 91-08736
- Vehicle registration: TS-19
- Website: telangana.gov.in

Hajipur is a village and mandal located in the Mancherial District of Telangana State in India.

== Administration divisions ==
There are 21 villages in Hajipur.

Sl.No.	Villages in the mandal	The erstwhile mandals from which the present mandal is formed
1	Chandanapur	Mancherial
2	Donabanda	Mancherial
3	Gadhpur	Mancherial
4	Gudipet	Mancherial
5	Hajipur	Mancherial
6	Karnamamidi	Mancherial
7	Kondapur	Mancherial
8	Kondepally	Mancherial
9	Kothapally	Mancherial
10	Mulkalla	Mancherial
11	Nagaram	Mancherial
12	Namnur	Mancherial
13	Narsingapur	Mancherial
14	Padthenpally	Mancherial
15	Peddampet	Mancherial
16	Rapalle	Mancherial
17	Ryali	Mancherial
18	Subbapally	Mancherial
19	Vempally	Mancherial
20	Hussainsagar	Mancherial
21	Pochampahad	Mancherial
