= List of constituencies of the Telangana Legislative Assembly =

Telangana Legislative Assembly

Type
- Type: Lower house of the Telangana Legislature
- Term limits: 5 years

History
- Founded: 2 June 2014 (12 years ago)
- Preceded by: Andhra Pradesh Legislative Assembly
- Seats: 119

Elections
- Voting system: First past the post
- First election: 2014
- Last election: 2023
- Next election: TBD

Meeting place
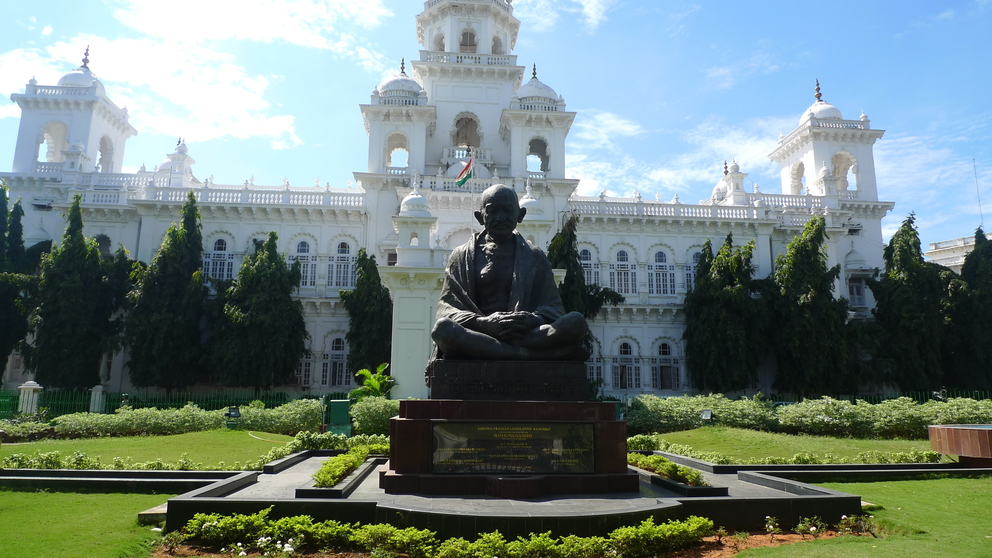
- Assembly Building, Hyderabad, Telangana

Website
- Telangana Legislative Assembly

Location of Telangana (highlighted in red) within India

The Telangana Legislative Assembly is the lower house of the bicameral legislature of Telangana state in India. It is housed in the Assembly Building, in Hyderabad, the capital of the state. The term of the assembly is five years, unless it is dissolved early.

Telangana was formed on 2 June 2014, after the passage of the Andhra Pradesh Reorganisation Act. It comprised 10 districts of Andhra Pradesh. The unified Legislative Assembly was also apportioned and 119 constituencies were assigned to the Legislative Assembly of the new state. The representatives of those constituencies, elected in the 2014 Andhra Pradesh Legislative Assembly election, became the members of the new assembly. Telangana has continued to have the same number of constituencies in the subsequent elections of 2018 and 2023.

Since the independence of India, the Scheduled Castes (SC) and Scheduled Tribes (ST) have been given reservation status, guaranteeing political representation, and the Constitution lays down the general principles of positive discrimination for SCs and STs. According to the 2011 census of India the Scheduled Castes and the Scheduled Tribes constitute a significant portion of the population of the state, at 15.45% and 9.08%, respectively. The Scheduled Castes have been granted a reservation of 19 seats in the assembly, while 12 constituencies are reserved for candidates of the Scheduled Tribes.

== Constituencies ==
The constituencies of Telangana with their reservation status indicated by colour.

The constituencies of the Telangana Legislative Assembly have not changed since its creation in 2014.

Reservation
Scheduled Castes (SC)
Scheduled Tribes (ST)

Constituencies of the Telangana Legislative Assembly
#	Name	Reserved for (SC/ST/None)	District(s)	Lok Sabha constituency	Electorate (2025)
1	Sirpur	None	Komaram Bheem Asifabad, Mancherial	Adilabad	231,455
2	Chennur	SC	Mancherial	Peddapalli	176,455
3	Bellampalli	SC	Mancherial	Peddapalli	178,586
4	Mancherial	None	Mancherial	Peddapalli	282,118
5	Asifabad	ST	Komaram Bheem Asifabad, Adilabad	Adilabad	229,765
6	Khanapur	ST	Adilabad, Mancherial, Nirmal	Adilabad	228,151
7	Adilabad	None	Adilabad	Adilabad	248,109
8	Boath	ST	Adilabad	Adilabad	214,588
9	Nirmal	None	Nirmal	Adilabad	261,087
10	Mudhole	None	Nirmal	Adilabad	258,406
11	Armur	None	Nizamabad	Nizamabad	214,266
12	Bodhan	None	Nizamabad	Nizamabad	224,941
13	Jukkal	SC	Kamareddy, Sangareddy	Zahirabad	252,432
14	Banswada	None	Kamareddy	Zahirabad	198,939
15	Yellareddy	None	Kamareddy	Zahirabad	226,145
16	Kamareddy	None	Kamareddy	Zahirabad	258,223
17	Nizamabad Urban	None	Nizamabad	Nizamabad	307,524
18	Nizamabad Rural	None	Nizamabad	Nizamabad	260,676
19	Balkonda	None	Nizamabad, Rajanna Sircilla	Nizamabad	229,696
20	Koratla	None	Jagtial	Nizamabad	248,320
21	Jagtial	None	Jagtial	Nizamabad	239,160
22	Dharmapuri	SC	Jagtial, Peddapalli	Peddapalli	233,323
23	Ramagundam	None	Peddapalli	Peddapalli	216,389
24	Manthani	None	Jayashankar Bhupalpally, Peddapalli	Peddapalli	240,935
25	Peddapalle	None	Peddapalli	Peddapalli	260,719
26	Karimnagar	None	Karimnagar	Karimnagar	368,269
27	Choppadandi	SC	Jagtial, Karimnagar, Rajanna Sircilla	Karimnagar	236,053
28	Vemulawada	None	Jagtial, Rajanna Sircilla	Karimnagar	228,164
29	Sircilla	None	Rajanna Sircilla	Karimnagar	248,440
30	Manakondur	SC	Karimnagar, Rajanna Sircilla, Siddipet	Karimnagar	226,525
31	Huzurabad	None	Karimnagar, Hanamkonda	Karimnagar	252,518
32	Husnabad	None	Karimnagar, Siddipet, Hanamkonda	Karimnagar	251,150
33	Siddipet	None	Siddipet	Medak	240,142
34	Medak	None	Medak	Medak	220,997
35	Narayankhed	None	Medak, Sangareddy	Zahirabad	237,485
36	Andole	SC	Medak, Sangareddy	Zahirabad	252,684
37	Narsapur	None	Medak, Sangareddy	Medak	230,355
38	Zahirabad	SC	Sangareddy	Zahirabad	239,483
39	Sangareddy	None	Sangareddy	Medak	215,382
40	Patancheru	None	Sangareddy	Medak	419,569
41	Dubbak	None	Medak, Siddipet	Medak	201,567
42	Gajwel	None	Medak, Siddipet	Medak	285,516
43	Medchal	None	Medchal-Malkajgiri	Malkajgiri	672,534
44	Malkajgiri	None	Medchal-Malkajgiri	Malkajgiri	513,356
45	Quthbullapur	None	Medchal-Malkajgiri	Malkajgiri	734,155
46	Kukatpally	None	Medchal-Malkajgiri	Malkajgiri	486,094
47	Uppal	None	Medchal-Malkajgiri	Malkajgiri	543,112
48	Ibrahimpatnam	None	Ranga Reddy	Bhongir	343,029
49	Lal Bahadur Nagar	None	Ranga Reddy, Medchal-Malkajgiri	Malkajgiri	606,190
50	Maheshwaram	None	Ranga Reddy	Chevella	564,125
51	Rajendranagar	None	Ranga Reddy	Chevella	619,158
52	Serilingampally	None	Ranga Reddy, Medchal-Malkajgiri	Chevella	765,982
53	Chevella	SC	Ranga Reddy, Vikarabad	Chevella	274,376
54	Pargi	None	Mahbubnagar, Vikarabad	Chevella	271,307
55	Vikarabad	SC	Vikarabad	Chevella	235,012
56	Tandur	None	Vikarabad	Chevella	247,836
57	Musheerabad	None	Hyderabad	Secunderabad	308,839
58	Malakpet	None	Hyderabad	Hyderabad	318,914
59	Amberpet	None	Hyderabad	Secunderabad	280,914
60	Khairatabad	None	Hyderabad	Secunderabad	294,603
61	Jubilee Hills	None	Hyderabad	Secunderabad	389,972
62	Sanathnagar	None	Hyderabad	Secunderabad	254,366
63	Nampally	None	Hyderabad	Secunderabad	330,538
64	Karwan	None	Hyderabad	Hyderabad	365,236
65	Goshamahal	None	Hyderabad	Hyderabad	277,086
66	Charminar	None	Hyderabad	Hyderabad	232,525
67	Chandrayangutta	None	Hyderabad	Hyderabad	354,726
68	Yakutpura	None	Hyderabad	Hyderabad	366,143
69	Bahadurpura	None	Hyderabad	Hyderabad	326,267
70	Secunderabad	None	Hyderabad	Secunderabad	268,743
71	Secunderabad Cantonment	SC	Hyderabad	Malkajgiri	255,320
72	Kodangal	None	Mahabubnagar, Vikarabad	Mahabubnagar	246,696
73	Narayanpet	None	Narayanpet	Mahabubnagar	238,800
74	Mahbubnagar	None	Mahabubnagar	Mahabubnagar	262,627
75	Jadcherla	None	Mahabubnagar, Nagarkurnool	Mahabubnagar	224,739
76	Devarkadra	None	Mahabubnagar, Wanaparthy	Mahabubnagar	241,173
77	Makthal	None	Mahabubnagar, Wanaparthy	Mahabubnagar	248,170
78	Wanaparthy	None	Mahabubnagar, Wanaparthy	Nagarkurnool	246,511
79	Gadwal	None	Jogulamba Gadwal	Nagarkurnool	234,633
80	Alampur	SC	Jogulamba Gadwal	Nagarkurnool	241,587
81	Nagarkurnool	None	Nagarkurnool	Nagarkurnool	237,640
82	Achampet	SC	Nagarkurnool	Nagarkurnool	249,796
83	Kalwakurthy	None	Nagarkurnool, Ranga Reddy	Nagarkurnool	246,659
84	Shadnagar	None	Ranga Reddy	Mahabubnagar	243,316
85	Kollapur	None	Nagarkurnool, Wanaparthy	Nagarkurnool	241,642
86	Devarakonda	ST	Nalgonda	Nalgonda	264,522
87	Nagarjuna Sagar	None	Nalgonda	Nalgonda	237,697
88	Miryalaguda	None	Nalgonda	Nalgonda	237,674
89	Huzurnagar	None	Suryapet	Nalgonda	253,229
90	Kodad	None	Suryapet	Nalgonda	247,368
91	Suryapet	None	Suryapet	Nalgonda	246,539
92	Nalgonda	None	Nalgonda	Nalgonda	251,491
93	Munugode	None	Nalgonda, Yadadri Bhuvanagiri	Bhongir	259,976
94	Bhongir	None	Yadadri Bhuvanagiri	Bhongir	222,705
95	Nakrekal	SC	Nalgonda, Yadadri Bhuvanagiri	Bhongir	255,419
96	Thungathurthi	SC	Nalgonda, Suryapet, Yadadri Bhuvanagiri	Bhongir	261,497
97	Alair	None	Jangaon, Yadadri Bhuvanagiri	Bhongir	238,352
98	Jangaon	None	Jangaon, Siddipet	Bhongir	246,106
99	Ghanpur Station	SC	Jangaon, Hanumakonda	Warangal	257,530
100	Palakurthi	None	Jangaon, Mahbubabad, Warangal	Warangal	258,470
101	Dornakal	ST	Mahbubabad	Mahabubabad	224,833
102	Mahabubabad	ST	Mahbubabad	Mahabubabad	260,859
103	Narsampet	None	Warangal	Mahabubabad	237,691
104	Parkal	None	Warangal, Hanumakonda	Warangal	223,367
105	Warangal West	None	Hanumakonda	Warangal	285,251
106	Warangal East	None	Hanumakonda	Warangal	259,835
107	Waradhanapet	None	Warangal, Hanumakonda	Warangal	275,927
108	Bhupalpalle	None	Jayashankar Bhupalpally, Warangal	Warangal	278,185
109	Mulug	ST	Mulugu, Mahbubabad	Mahabubabad	235,486
110	Pinapaka	ST	Bhadradri Kothagudem	Mahabubabad	205,182
111	Yellandu	ST	Bhadradri Kothagudem, Khammam, Mahabubabad	Mahabubabad	226,815
112	Khammam	None	Khammam	Khammam	324,308
113	Palair	None	Khammam	Khammam	243,051
114	Madhira	SC	Khammam	Khammam	223,510
115	Wyra	ST	Bhadradri Kothagudem, Khammam	Khammam	194,738
116	Sathupalli	SC	Khammam	Khammam	245,653
117	Kothagudem	None	Bhadradri Kothagudem	Khammam	248,390
118	Aswaraopeta	ST	Bhadradri Kothagudem	Khammam	160,629
119	Bhadrachalam	ST	Bhadradri Kothagudem, Jayashankar Bhupalpally	Mahabubabad	154,134

== See also ==
- List of constituencies of the Andhra Pradesh Legislative Assembly
- Telangana Legislative Council
- List of constituencies of the Lok Sabha
