= Mancherial Assembly constituency =

Constituency of the Telangana legislative assembly in India

Coordinates: 18.88°N 79.46°E

Mancherial
- Constituency No. 4 for the Telangana Legislative Assembly
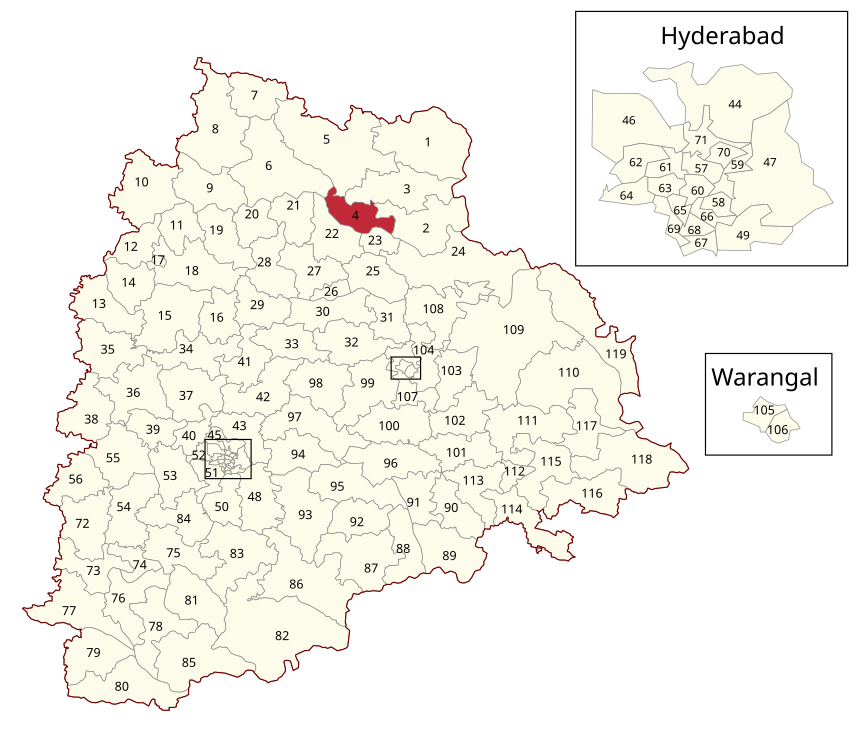
- Location of Mancherial Assembly constituency within Telangana

Constituency details
- Country: India
- Region: South India
- State: Telangana
- District: Mancherial
- Lok Sabha constituency: Peddapalli
- Established: 1951
- Total electors: 1,96,922
- Reservation: None

Member of Legislative Assembly
- 3rd Telangana Legislative Assembly
- Incumbent K prem sagar rao
- Elected year: 2023

Mancherial Assembly constituency is a constituency of Telangana Legislative Assembly, India. It is one of the three constituencies in Mancherial district. It comes under Peddapalli Lok Sabha constituency along with six other assembly constituencies.

Kokkirala Premsagar Rao of Indian National Congress is currently representing the constituency.

== Mandals ==
The assembly constituency presently comprises the following Mandals:

Mandal
Mancherial
Dandepally
Luxettipet
Naspur
Hajipur

== Members of Legislative Assembly - Luxettipet ==
Year	Member	Political party
1952	Soore Viswanath Rao	Socialist Party
1952	Kodati Rajamallu	Socialist Party
1957	G. V. Pithambara Rao	Indian National Congress
1962	G. V. Pithambara Rao	Independent politician
1967	V. N. Rao	Indian National Congress
1972	J. V. Narsingh Rao	Indian National Congress
1978	J. V. Narsingh Rao	Janata Party
1983	Madavarapu Murali Manohar Rao	Telugu Desam Party
1985	Madavarapu Murali Manohar Rao	Telugu Desam Party
1989	Madavarapu Murali Manohar Rao	Telugu Desam Party
1994	Gone Hanmantha Rao	Communist Party of India
1999	Gone Hanmantha Rao	Telugu Desam Party
2004	Gone Hanmantha Rao	Telugu Desam Party

== Members of Legislative Assembly Mancherial ==
Year	Member	Political party
2009	Aravind Reddy Gaddam	Telangana Rashtra Samithi
2010★	Aravind Reddy Gaddam	Telangana Rashtra Samithi
Telangana Legislative Assembly
2014	Diwakar Rao Nadipelli	Telangana Rashtra Samithi
2018	Diwakar Rao Nadipelli	Telangana Rashtra Samithi
2023	K. Premsagar Rao	Indian National Congress

★by-election

== Election Results ==
=== 2023 ===
2023 Telangana Legislative Assembly election: Mancherial
Party	Candidate	Votes	%	±%
INC	Kokkirala Premsagar Rao	105,945	55.03	
BJP	Raghunath Verabelli	39,829	20.69	
BRS	Diwakar Rao Nadipelli	37,989	19.73	
IND	Soulla Sandeep	1,890	0.98	
BSP	Thota Srinivas	1,280	0.66	
Majority		66,116	34.34	
Turnout		192,522		
INC gain from BRS		Swing		

=== 2018 ===
2018 Telangana Legislative Assembly election: Mancherial
Party	Candidate	Votes	%	±%
TRS	Diwakar Rao Nadipelli	75,360	45.20	
INC	Kokkirala Premsagar Rao	70,512	42.29	
BJP	Raghunath Verabelli	5,018	3.01	
BSP	Bera Sathyanarayana	2,174	1.30	
Majority		4,848	2.91	
Turnout		166,725		
TRS hold		Swing		

=== 2014 ===
2014 Telangana Legislative Assembly election: Mancherial
Party	Candidate	Votes	%	±%
TRS	Diwakar Rao Nadipelli	95,171	61.62	
INC	Gaddam Aravinda Reddy	35,921	23.26	
BJP	Mulkala Mallareddy	11,584	7.50	
IND	Azmeera Lalkumar	5,110	3.31	
NOTA	None of the Above	1,482	0.96	
Majority		59,250	38.36	
Turnout		154,453	64.76	
TRS hold		Swing		

=== 2010 By-election ===
2010 Andhra Pradesh Legislative Assembly by-election: Mancherial
Party	Candidate	Votes	%	±%
TRS	Gaddam Aravinda Reddy	95,311	73.17	
TDP	Gone Hanmantha Rao	17,264	13.25	
INC	Rachakonda Krishna Rao	12,648	9.71	
Majority		78,047	59.92	
Turnout		130,264		
TRS hold		Swing		

=== 2009 ===
2009 Andhra Pradesh Legislative Assembly election: Mancherial
Party	Candidate	Votes	%	±%
TRS	Gaddam Aravinda Reddy	58,340	44.13	
INC	Diwakar Rao Nadipelli	44,513	33.67	
PRP	Karre Lachanna	13,997	10.59	
BJP	Peddapally Purushotham	3,824	2.89	
LSP	Thammadi Srinivas	2,152	1.63	
Majority		13,827	10.46	
Turnout		132,187		
Swing to TRS from INC		Swing		

== Election results ==
=== Assembly Election 2004 ===
2004 Andhra Pradesh Legislative Assembly election : Luxettipet
Party	Candidate	Votes	%	±%
INC	Diwakar Rao Nadipelli	60,530	42.16%	
TDP	Gone Hanmantha Rao	50,000	34.82%	
Independent	Thota Srinivas	20,410	14.21%	
Margin of victory		10,530	7.34%	
Turnout		143,580	72.40%	
Total valid votes		143,580		
INC gain from TDP		Swing		

=== Assembly Election 1999 ===
1999 Andhra Pradesh Legislative Assembly election : Luxettipet
Party	Candidate	Votes	%	±%
INC	Nadipelli Diwakar Rao	63,348	48.21%	
TDP	Gone Hanmantha Rao	51,200	38.97%	
Margin of victory		12,148	9.24%	
Turnout		131,390	68.50%	
Total valid votes		131,390		
INC gain from CPI		Swing		

=== Assembly Election 1994 ===
1994 Andhra Pradesh Legislative Assembly election : Luxettipet
Party	Candidate	Votes	%	±%
CPI	Gone Hanmantha Rao	78,572	58.40%	
INC	G. V. Sudhakar Rao	42,100	31.29%	
Margin of victory		36,472	27.11%	
Turnout		134,540	71.20%	
Total valid votes		134,540		
CPI gain from TDP		Swing		

=== Assembly Election 1989 ===
1989 Andhra Pradesh Legislative Assembly election : Luxettipet
Party	Candidate	Votes	%	±%
INC	G. V. Sudhakar Rao	52,400	47.80%	
TDP	Gone Hanmantha Rao	48,120	43.89%	
Margin of victory		4,280	3.91%	
Turnout		109,620	66.40%	
Total valid votes		109,620		
INC gain from TDP		Swing		

=== Assembly Election 1985 ===
1985 Andhra Pradesh Legislative Assembly election : Luxettipet
Party	Candidate	Votes	%	±%
INC	G. V. Sudhakar Rao	46,349	49.20%	
TDP	Kalakuntla Surendar Rao	41,200	43.73%	
Margin of victory		5,149	5.47%	
Turnout		94,200	64.10%	
Total valid votes		94,200		
INC gain from TDP		Swing		

=== Assembly Election 1983 ===
1983 Andhra Pradesh Legislative Assembly election : Luxettipet
Party	Candidate	Votes	%	±%
TDP	Madavarapu Murali Manohar Rao	44,120	51.30%	
INC	G. V. Sudhakar Rao	37,800	43.95%	
Margin of victory		6,320	7.35%	
Turnout		86,010	63.80%	
Total valid votes		86,010		
TDP gain from JP		Swing		

=== Assembly Election 1978 ===
1978 Andhra Pradesh Legislative Assembly election : Luxettipet
Party	Candidate	Votes	%	±%
JP	Chunchu Lakshmaiah	22,716	36.38%	
INC(I)	Kande Venkata Ramanaiah	20,410	32.69%	
INC	J. V. Narsingh Rao	15,200	24.34%	
Margin of victory		2,306	3.69%	
Turnout		62,440	60.50%	
Total valid votes		62,440		
JP win		Swing	New	

=== Assembly Election 1972 ===
1972 Andhra Pradesh Legislative Assembly election : Luxettipet
Party	Candidate	Votes	%	±%
INC	J. V. Narsingh Rao	28,400	58.20%	
Independent	Chunchu Lakshmaiah	17,200	35.25%	
Margin of victory		11,200	22.95%	
Turnout		48,800	55.40%	
Total valid votes		48,800		
INC win		Swing		

=== Assembly Election 1967 ===
1967 Andhra Pradesh Legislative Assembly election : Luxettipet
Party	Candidate	Votes	%	±%
INC	V. N. Rao	22,100	51.40%	
Independent	G. V. Pithambara Rao	18,400	42.79%	
Margin of victory		3,700	8.61%	
Turnout		43,000	52.10%	
Total valid votes		43,000		
INC gain from Independent		Swing		

=== Assembly Election 1962 ===
1962 Andhra Pradesh Legislative Assembly election : Luxettipet
Party	Candidate	Votes	%	±%
Independent	G. V. Pithambara Rao	19,800	49.50%	
INC	K. V. Keshavulu	17,600	44.00%	
Margin of victory		2,200	5.50%	
Turnout		40,000	48.90%	
Total valid votes		40,000		
Independent win		Swing		

=== Assembly Election 1957 ===
1957 Andhra Pradesh Legislative Assembly election : Luxettipet
Party	Candidate	Votes	%	±%
INC	G. V. Pithambara Rao	18,200	52.30%	
Socialist	S. V. Rao	14,500	41.67%	
Margin of victory		3,700	10.63%	
Turnout		34,800	44.20%	
Total valid votes		34,800		
INC win		Swing		

=== Assembly Election 1952 ===
1952 Hyderabad State Legislative Assembly election : Luxettipet
Party	Candidate	Votes	%	±%
Socialist	Soore Viswanath Rao	21,400	54.18%	New
Socialist	Kodati Rajamallu	18,100	45.82%	New
Margin of victory		3,300	8.36%	New
Turnout		39,500	42.10%	New
Total valid votes		39,500		
Socialist win		Swing	New	

== See also ==
- List of constituencies of Telangana Legislative Assembly
