= Boda Janardhan =

Indian politician

Member of Andhra Pradesh Legislative Assembly
- In office 1985–2004
- Preceded by: S. Sanjiva Rao
- Succeeded by: G. Vinod
- Constituency: Chennur

Personal details
- Born: Boda Janardhan
- Party: Indian National Congress (2022-present)
- Other political affiliations: Bharatiya Janata Party, Telugu Desam Party

Boda Janardhan is an Indian politician. He was elected to the Andhra Pradesh Legislative Assembly from Chennur in the 1985, 1989, 1994 and 1999 Andhra Pradesh Legislative Assembly election as a member of the Telugu Desam Party and served as Labour minister in N.T. Rama Rao's Cabinet.

In June 2019, Reddy along with BRS leader A. P. Jithender Reddy, Chada Suresh Reddy, who were Ministers in Andhra Pradesh and former Congress MLC, P. Sudhakar Reddy joined the Bharatiya Janata Party.
