= Peddapalli Lok Sabha constituency =

Constituency of the Indian parliament in Telangana

Coordinates: 18.6°N 79.4°E

Peddapalli TG-2
- Lok Sabha constituency
- Boundary of Peddapalli Constituency in Telangana

Constituency details
- Country: India
- Region: South India
- State: Telangana
- Assembly constituencies: Chennur; Bellampalli; Mancherial; Dharmapuri; Ramagundam; Manthani; Peddapalle
- Established: 1962
- Total electors: 1,425,361
- Reservation: SC

Member of Parliament
- 18th Lok Sabha
- Incumbent Vamsi Krishna Gaddam
- Party: Indian National Congress
- Elected year: 2024

Peddapalli Lok Sabha constituency is one of the 17 Lok Sabha (Lower House of the Parliament) constituencies in Telangana state in southern India. This constituency is reserved for the candidates belonging to the Scheduled castes

== Overview ==
Since its inception in 1962 Peddapalli seat is a Congress stronghold, various political outfits like the Telangana Praja Samithi and the Telugu Desam Party have won it during different general elections.

After the formation of Telangana the Telangana Rashtra Samithi won the seat for the first time in 2014 General Election.

== Assembly segments ==
Peddapalli Lok Sabha constituency presently comprises the following Legislative Assembly segments:

#	Name	District	Member	Party	Leading (in 2024)
2	Chennur (SC)	Mancherial	Gaddam Vivek Venkatswamy	INC	INC
3	Bellampalli (SC)	Mancherial	Gaddam Vinod Kumar	INC	INC
4	Mancherial	Mancherial	Kokkirala Premsagar Rao	INC	INC
22	Dharmapuri (SC)	Jagitial	Adluri Laxman Kumar	INC	BJP
23	Ramagundam	Peddapalli	Makkan Singh Raj Thakur	INC	INC
24	Manthani	Peddapalli	D. Sridhar Babu	INC	INC
25	Peddapalle	Peddapalli	Chinthakunta Vijaya Ramana Rao	INC	INC

== Members of Parliament ==
Year	Member	Party
1952-1962 : Constituency did not exist
Andhra Pradesh
1962	M. R. Krishna	Indian National Congress
1967	M. R. Krishna	Indian National Congress
1971	V. Tulasiram	Telangana Praja Samithi
1977	V. Tulasiram	Indian National Congress
1980	K. Rajamallu	Indian National Congress
1984	G. Bhoopathy	Telugu Desam Party
1989	G. Venkat Swamy	Indian National Congress
1991	G. Venkat Swamy	Indian National Congress
1996	G. Venkat Swamy	Indian National Congress
1998	Chellamalla Suguna Kumari	Telugu Desam Party
1999	Chellamalla Suguna Kumari	Telugu Desam Party
2004	G. Venkat Swamy	Indian National Congress
2009	Gaddam Vivekanand	Indian National Congress
Telangana
2014	Balka Suman	Bharat Rashtra Samithi
2019	Venkatesh Netha Borlakunta	Bharat Rashtra Samithi
2024	Vamsi Krishna Gaddam	Indian National Congress

== Election results ==
=== General election, 2024 ===
2024 Indian general election: Peddapalle
Party	Candidate	Votes	%	±%
INC	Vamsi Krishna Gaddam	475,587	43.42	▲7.74
BJP	Gomase Srinivas	344,223	31.43	▲21.88
BRS	Koppula Eshwar	193,356	17.65	▼27.84
BSP	Erukulla Raja Narsaiah	6,799	0.62	▼0.33
NOTA	None of the above	5,711	0.52	
Majority		131,364	11.99	▲2.18
Turnout		1,095,295	67.87	▲2.28
INC gain from BRS		Swing		

Detailed Results at: https://results.eci.gov.in/PcResultGenJune2024/ConstituencywiseS292.htm

=== General election, 2019 ===
2019 Indian general elections: Peddapalle
Party	Candidate	Votes	%	±%
BRS	Venkatesh Netha Borlakunta	441,321	45.49	▼11.33
INC	Agam Chandrasekhar	3,46,141	35.68	▲8.11
BJP	Sogala Kumar	92,606	9.55	New
IND.	Kuntala Narsaiah	18,219	1.88	N/A
BSP	Bala Kalyan Panja	10,203	1.05	New
NOTA	None of the above	8,971	0.92	N/A
Majority		95,180	9.81	▼18.67
Turnout		9,70,165	65.59	▼6.34
TRS hold		Swing		

=== General election, 2014 ===
2014 Indian general elections: Peddapalle
Party	Candidate	Votes	%	±%
TRS	Balka Suman	565,496	56.82	▲27.54
INC	Gaddam Vivekanand	2,74,338	27.57	▼7.13
TDP	Dr. Janapati Sarat Babu	63,334	6.36	New
RP (K)	Velthuru Mallaiah	45,977	4.62	New
BSP	Tagaram Shankar Lal	9,449	0.95	New
Majority		2,91,158	28.48	▲23.06
Turnout		10,22,184	71.93	▲6.02
TRS gain from INC		Swing		

=== General election, 2009 ===
2009 Indian general elections: Peddapalle
Party	Candidate	Votes	%	±%
INC	Gaddam Vivekanand	313,748	34.70	▼26.21
TRS	Gomasa Srinivas	2,64,731	29.28	New
PRP	Arepelli David Raju	1,75,605	19.42	New
Majority		49,017	5.42	▼22.59
Turnout		9,04,084	68.72	
INC hold		Swing		

=== General election, 2004 ===
General Election, 2004: Peddapalli
Party	Candidate	Votes	%	±%
INC	G. Venkat Swamy	572,207	60.91	+15.52
TDP	Suguna Kumari	309,072	32.90	−14.34
BSP	Kannam Raghu	26,554	2.80	
Independent	Kampelli Srinivas	14,151	1.51	
Independent	Maddela Odelu	8,829	0.94	
Independent	Kamilla Jaya Rao	8,637	0.92	
Majority		263,135	28.01	+29.86
Turnout		939,450	67.78	+0.04
INC hold		Swing	+15.52	

== Trivia ==
- The Lok Sabha constituency includes three assembly constituencies from Adilabad district i.e. Chennur, Bellampalli, Mancherial
- G. Venkat Swamy, former Union Minister represented the constituency in Ninth, Tenth, Eleventh and Fourteenth Lok Sabha respectively.

== See also ==
- Karimnagar district
- List of constituencies of the Lok Sabha
