= Gaddam Vinod Kumar =

Indian politician

Member of Telangana Legislative Assembly
- Incumbent
- Assumed office December 2023
- Chief Minister: Revanth Reddy
- Preceded by: Durgam Chinnaiah
- Constituency: Bellampalli

Personal details
- Born: 16 September 1956 (age 70)
- Party: Indian National Congress (2023-present)
- Relations: Gaddam Vivek Venkatswamy (brother)
- Parent(s): Gaddam Venkatswamy (father), Kalavathi (mother)

Gaddam Vinod Venkataswamy (born 16 September 1956) is an Indian politician from Telangana. He is an MLA from Bellampalli Assembly Constituency in Mancherial District. He won the 2023 Telangana Legislative Assembly election.

== Electoral history ==
Year	Constituency	Party	Votes	Opponent		Result	Margin
1999	Chennur	INC	42,150	TDP	Boda Janardhan	Lost	-8,450
2004	Chennur	INC	58,430	TDP	Boda Janardhan	Won	1,037
2009	Chennur	INC	33,463	TRS	Nalla Odelu	Lost	-11,549
2010 (By-election)	Chennur	INC	23,603	TRS	Nalla Odelu	Lost	-44,284
2014	Chennur	INC	38,703	TRS	Nalla Odelu	Lost	-26,164
2018	Bellampalli	BSP	43,750	TRS	Durgam Chinnaiah	Lost	-11,276
2023	Bellampalli	INC	82,217	BRS	Durgam Chinnaiah	Won	36,878

== Early life and education ==
Vinod is born to Gaddam Venkataswamy and Kalavati. He has a brother and three sisters. He did his schooling at All Saints High School in Hyderabad and later, completed his Class 10 from Hyderabad Public School. He did his intermediate at Nrupatunga Junior College before completing his graduation at Nizam College in 1975.

He is a businessman. He started Veenus Tobacco in 1976. He also started a Cement factory in Vikarabad, which he later sold to India Cements.

He served as vice-president of the Hyderabad Cricket Association and then became its president from 1996 to 2004. His brother Vivek leads Visakha Industries which got a nod to construct the Rajiv Gandhi International Cricket Stadium in Uppal, Hyderabad.

He was also the President of the Hyderabad Cricket Association from 2004 to 2010 and again from 2012 to 2014.

== Political life ==
He entered politics in 1999, but lost Chennur Assembly Constituency representing Indian National Congress to Telugu Desam Party’s Boda Janardhan. He came back and defeated him in 2004 election. He served as Minister for Labour and Textiles in Andhra Pradesh from 2004 to 2009 in the Y. S. Rajasekhar Reddy ministry.

Then, he lost the 2009 Assembly Elections to Nalla Odellu from the BRS. Later, he lost the 2010 by-election and the 2014 Assembly election from Chennur against Odellu. He shifted to Bahujan Samaj Party, but lost the 2018 Assembly election from Bellampalli Assembly Constituency against Durgam Chinnaiah of the BRS. In 2023, he returned to Congress and won the Bellampalli Constituency against Durgam Chinnaiah of the BRS polling 82,217 votes with a vote share of 57.96%.

Year	Election	Constituency	Party	Outcome	Opponent	Opponent Party
1999	MLA	Chennur constituency	INC	Lost	Boda Janardhan	TDP
2004	MLA	Chennur constituency	INC	Won	Boda Janardhan	TDP
2009	MLA	Chennur constituency	INC	Lost	Nallala Odelu	TRS
2010 'By-election'	MLA	Chennur constituency	INC	Lost	Nallala Odelu	TRS
2014	MLA	Chennur constituency	INC	Lost	Nallala Odelu	TRS
2018	MLA	Bellampalli constituency	BSP	Lost	Durgam Chinnaiah	TRS
2023	MLA	Bellampalli constituency	INC	Won	Durgam Chinnaiah	BRS
