= Gaddam Sammaiah =

Theatre artist

Padma Shri Gaddam Sammaiah
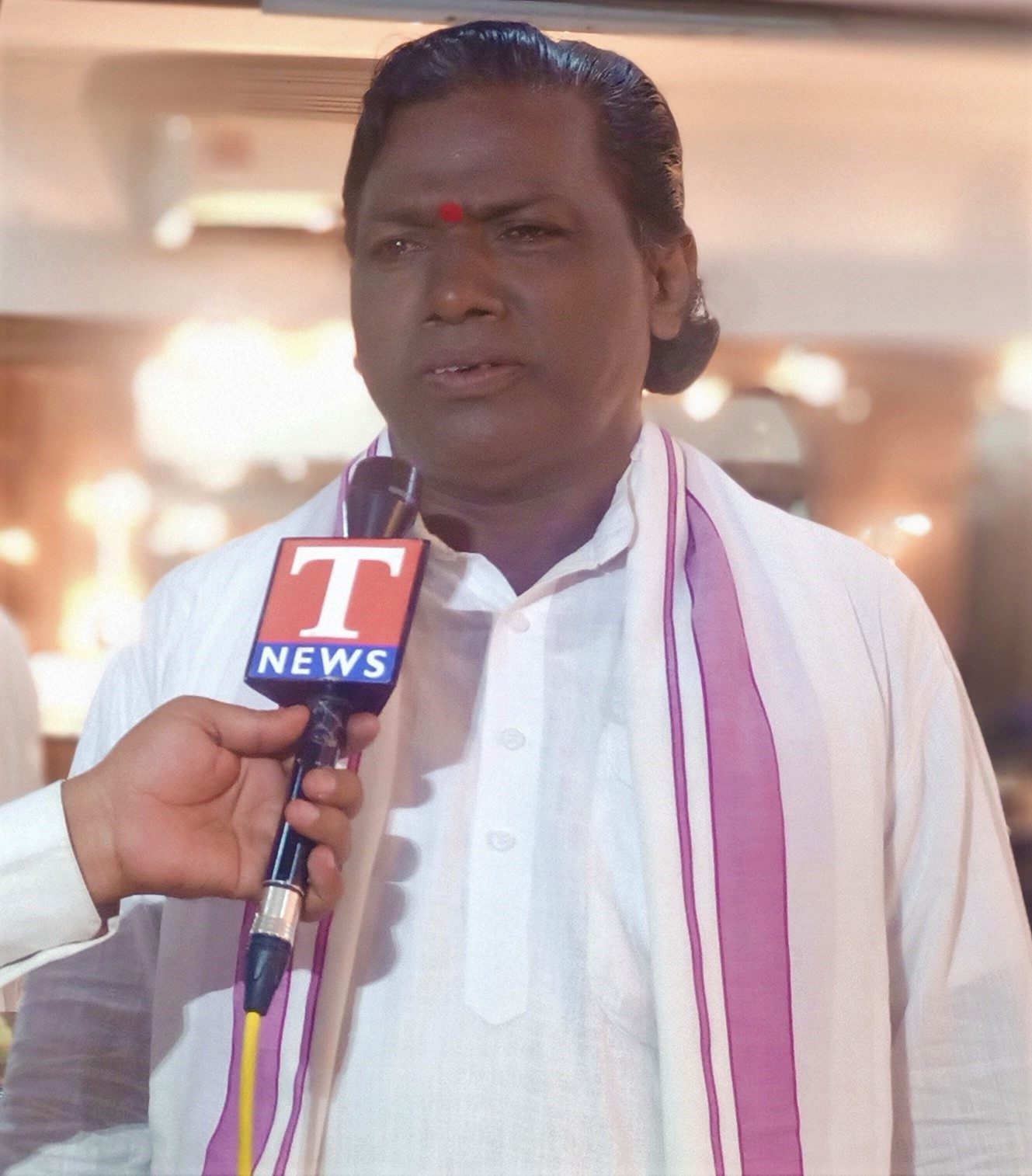
- Gaddam Sammaiah in 2021
- Born: Gaddam Sammaiah; 5 January 1958 (age 68); Appireddipally, Devaruppula Mandal, Jangaon, Telangana, India
- Known for: Chindu Yakshaganam
- Spouse: Sriranjani
- Children: Somaraju, Himagiri, Muralikrishna
- Honors: Padma Shri (2024)

Gaddam Sammaiah is an Chindu Yakshaganam theatre artist from Jangaon in Telangana, India. He has been performing this art form for over five decades, with more than 19,000 shows addressing social issues such as total literacy and environmental protection through his art. Sammaiah founded Chindu Yaksha Kalakarula Sangham and Gaddam Sammaiah Yuva Kala Kshetram to promote this art.

In 2024 Government of India awarded him with Padma Shri, the fourth-highest civilian award in India.

== Awards and recognition ==
Gaddam Sammaiah was honoured with the Padma Shri in 2024 on the eve of the 75th Republic Day celebrations, India's fourth-highest civilian award for his outstanding contribution to the arts and society.

Gaddam Sammaiah was honoured by Governor Jishnu Deva Verma on the eve of Telangana Formation Day celebrations on 2 June 2025 At Raj Bhavan in Hyderabad.
