= K. M. Krishnamurthy =

Indian politician

Member of Legislative Assembly
- In office 1994–2010
- Preceded by: M Veerabhadrappa
- Constituency: Kadur

Personal details
- Born: 27 May 1949 Kadur, Chikkamagaluru
- Died: 19 July 2010 (aged 61) Bangalore
- Party: Indian National Congress
- Parent(s): K H Mudiyappa, Jayamma
- Education: BA at Mysore University
- Occupation: Politician

K. M. Krishnamurthy was an Indian politician from the state of Karnataka. He was a leader of the Indian National Congress. He was elected as an MLA from Kadur assembly constituency for four consecutive terms.
