= Gaddam Venkatswamy =

Indian politician

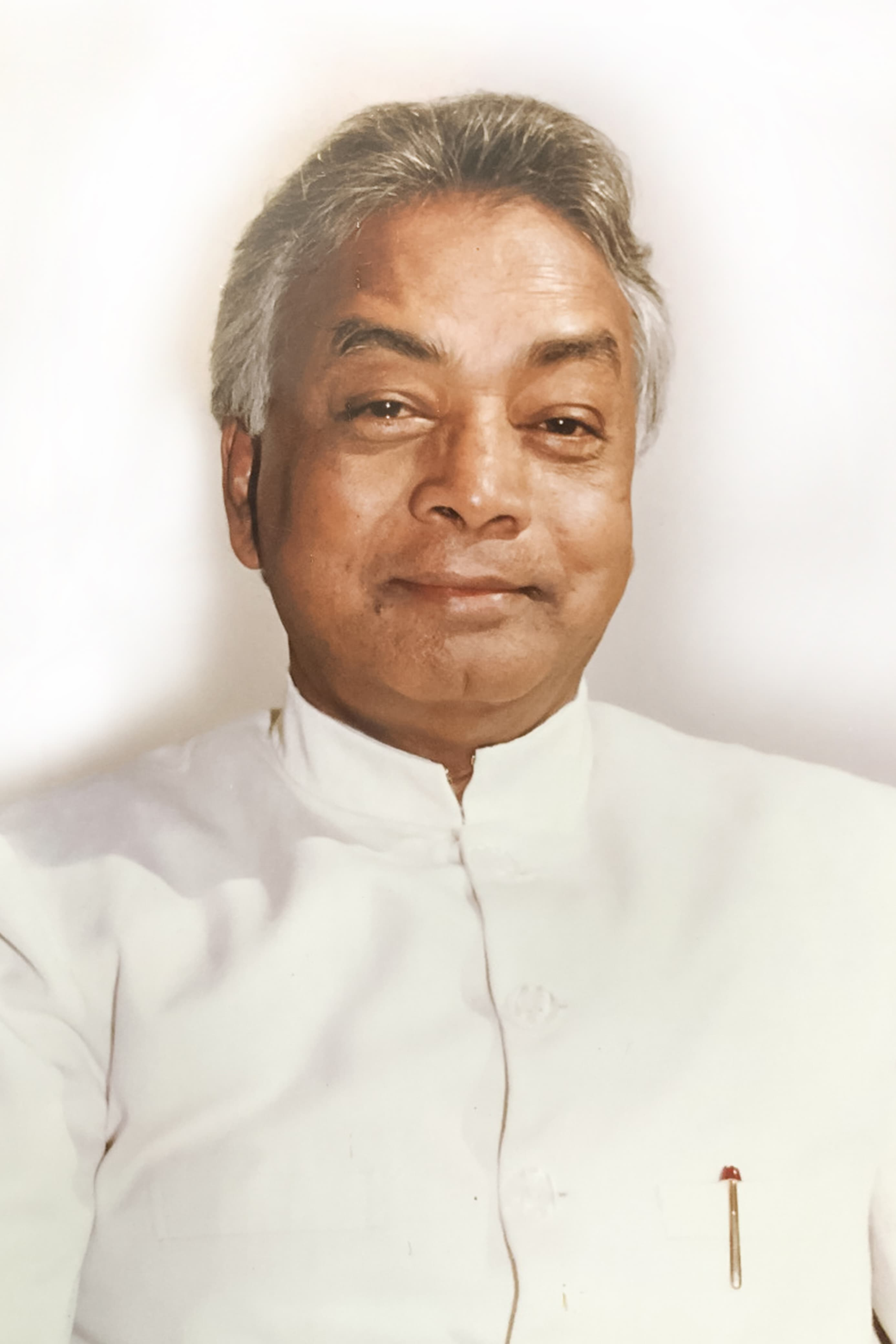

Member of Parliament, Lok Sabha
- In office 13 May 2004 – 16 May 2009
- Preceded by: Chellamalla Suguna Kumari
- Succeeded by: Gaddam Vivek Venkatswamy
- Constituency: Peddapalli
- In office 2 December 1989 – 10 March 1998
- Preceded by: G. Bhoopathy
- Succeeded by: Chellamalla Suguna Kumari
- Constituency: Peddapalli
- In office 22 March 1967 – 23 March 1977
- Preceded by: Constituency established
- Succeeded by: Nandi Yellaiah
- Constituency: Siddipet

Personal details
- Born: 5 October 1929 Hyderabad, Telangana, India
- Died: 22 December 2014 (aged 85) Hyderabad, Telangana, India
- Party: INC
- Spouse: Kalavati
- Children: Gaddam Vivekanand, Gaddam Vinod Kumar and 3 daughters

Gaddam Venkatswamy (5 October 1929 – 22 December 2014) was an Indian politician who was a member of the 14th Lok Sabha.

== Electoral History ==
Year	Constituency	Party	Votes	%	Opponent	Party	Votes	%	Result	Margin	%
1957	Chennur	INC	13,382	50.11	S. Rajamallu	Independent	13,323	49.89	Won	+59	+0.22
1967	Siddipet	INC	1,46,609	43.12	A. R. Devraj	CPI	94,801	27.88	Won	+51,808	+15.24
1971	Siddipet	TPS	1,69,436	65.08	A. R. Devraj	CPI	79,851	30.67	Won	+89,585	+34.41
1977	Peddapalli	INC	2,05,537	54.43	C. Janga Reddy	JP	1,22,542	32.45	Won	+82,995	+21.98
1978	Chennur	INC(I)	32,870	59.98	Kottapalli Raghavulu	JP	13,445	24.53	Won	+19,425	+35.45
1989	Peddapalli	INC	3,20,628	50.05	Gotte Bhoopathy	TDP	2,89,993	45.27	Won	+30,635	+4.78
1991	Peddapalli	INC	2,75,417	47.96	Gotte Bhoopathy	TDP	1,72,835	30.10	Won	+1,02,582	+17.86
1996	Peddapalli	INC	2,80,632	39.02	Gotte Bhoopathy	TDP	2,24,206	31.17	Won	+56,426	+7.85
1998	Peddapalli	INC	2,71,833	36.21	Chellamalla Suguna Kumari	TDP	2,78,137	37.05	Lost	-6,304	-0.84
1999	Peddapalli	INC	3,19,167	42.10	Chellamalla Suguna Kumari	TDP	3,61,228	47.65	Lost	-42,061	-5.55
2004	Peddapalli	INC	5,59,207	58.70	Chellamalla Suguna Kumari	TDP	3,09,472	32.48	Won	+2,49,735	+26.22

== Career ==
He represented the Peddapalli constituency of Telangana and was a member of the Indian National Congress (INC) political party. He was popularly known as Kaka or Gudisela Venkataswamy. He was elected to Lok Sabha 7 times, 4 times from Peddapalli Lok Sabha and 3 times from Siddipet Lok Sabha. His son Gaddam Vivekanand represented Peddapalli Lok Sabha from 2009–2014.

== Personal life ==
Both his sons Gaddam Vinod Kumar, former MLA and Minister and Gaddam Vivekanand are politicians. Venkatswamy died of an illness on 22 December 2014, in Care hospital in Hyderabad. He belonged to Mala community.

Kaka Garu was an Indian politician who served as a three-time MLA, seven-time member of parliament, and three-time Union Minister in various Congress-led governments. Known for his dedication to public service and his close association with some of India’s most influential political leaders, Kaka Garu played a crucial role in shaping welfare policies and political reforms in India.

== Positions held ==
- 1957– 62 and 1978–84 Member, Andhra Pradesh Legislative Assembly (two terms)
- 1967 Elected to 4th Lok Sabha
- 1969 – 71 Member, Public Accounts Committee
- 1971 Re-elected to 5th Lok Sabha (2nd term)
- Feb. 1973 – Nov. 1973 Union Deputy Minister, Labour and Rehabilitation
- Nov. 1973 – March 1977 Union Deputy Minister, Supply and Rehabilitation
- 1977 Re-elected to 6th Lok Sabha (3rd term)
- 1978 – 1982 Cabinet Minister, Labour and Civil Supply, Andhra Pradesh
- 1982 – 1984 President, P.C.C.(I.), Andhra Pradesh
- 1989 Elected to 9th Lok Sabha (4th term)
- 1990 – 1991 Member, Committee on the Welfare of Scheduled Castes and Scheduled Tribes, Member, Consultative Committee, Ministry of Industry
- 1991 Re-elected to 10th Lok Sabha (5th term)
- 21 June 1991-17 Jan. 1993 Union Minister of State, Rural Development
- 18 January 1993 – 10 February 1995 Union Minister of State, Textiles (Independent Charge)
- 10 February 1995 – 15 September 1995 Union Cabinet Minister, Textiles
- 15 September 1995 – 10 May 1996 Union Cabinet Minister, Labour
- 20 February 1996 – 16 May 1996 Union Cabinet Minister, Labour and Textiles
- 1996 Re-elected to 11th Lok Sabha (6th term)
- 2004 Re-elected to 14th Lok Sabha (7th term)
- Member, Committee on Energy
- Member, Committee on Installation of Portraits/Statues of National Leaders, Parliamentarians in Parliament House Complex
- Member, Committee on Ethics
- Member, Consultative Committee, Ministry of Heavy Industries
- 5 August 2007 onwards – Member, Standing Committee on Energy

== Social and cultural activities ==
Founded, (i) Dr. B.R. Ambedkar Post Graduate Centre, (ii) Dr. B.R. Ambedkar Degree College, (iii) Law College, (iv) Junior College, (v) High School; general secretary, National Huts Union, Hyderabad; provided permanent accommodation for 75,000 hut dwellers; founder president, Dr. B.R. Ambedkar Education Society which was later converted into Public Education Trust and inaugurated by the then president of India Shri V.V. Giri in 1973; under this society nine colleges are running without taking donations.

Kaka helped 80,000 homeless get homes without caste bias without seeing if they are SC, ST or BC.
