= Nadipelli Diwakar Rao =

Indian politician and legislator

Member of Telangana Legislative Assembly
- In office 2014–2023
- Succeeded by: Kokkirala Premsagar Rao
- Constituency: Mancheriala

Personal details
- Born: 1953 (age 72–73) Adilabad, India
- Party: Bharat Rashtra Samithi

Nadipelli Diwakar Rao (born 1953) is an Indian politician and a legislator of Telangana Legislative Assembly. He won as MLA from Mancherial assembly constituency on Bharat Rashtra Samithi ticket.

== Early life ==
He was born in Adilabad, Telangana to N. Laxman Rao. He is a graduate and did his BA. He was an agriculturist before joining politics.

== Career ==
Rao was two time MLA of Indian National Congress in two terms 1999 and 2004.

=== BRS party ===
He joined BRS party before the election in 2014. He won as MLA in 2014 from Mancherial assembly constituency.

== Electoral history ==
Year	Constituency	Party	Votes	Opponent		Result	Margin
1999	Luxettipet Assembly constituency|Luxettipet]]	INC	76,581	TDP	Gone Hanmantha Rao	Won	13,233
2004	Luxettipet Assembly constituency|Luxettipet]]	INC	60,530	TDP	Gone Hanmantha Rao	Won	166
2009	Mancherial	INC	44,513	TRS	Gaddam Aravinda Reddy	Lost	-13,827
2014	Mancherial	TRS	95,171	INC	Gaddam Aravinda Reddy	Won	59,250
2018	Mancherial	TRS	75,360	INC	Kokkirala Premsagar Rao	Won	4,848
2023	Mancherial	BRS	37,989	INC	Kokkirala Premsagar Rao	Lost	-67,956
