= Gaddam Padmaja Reddy =

Indian Kuchipudi exponent (born 1967)

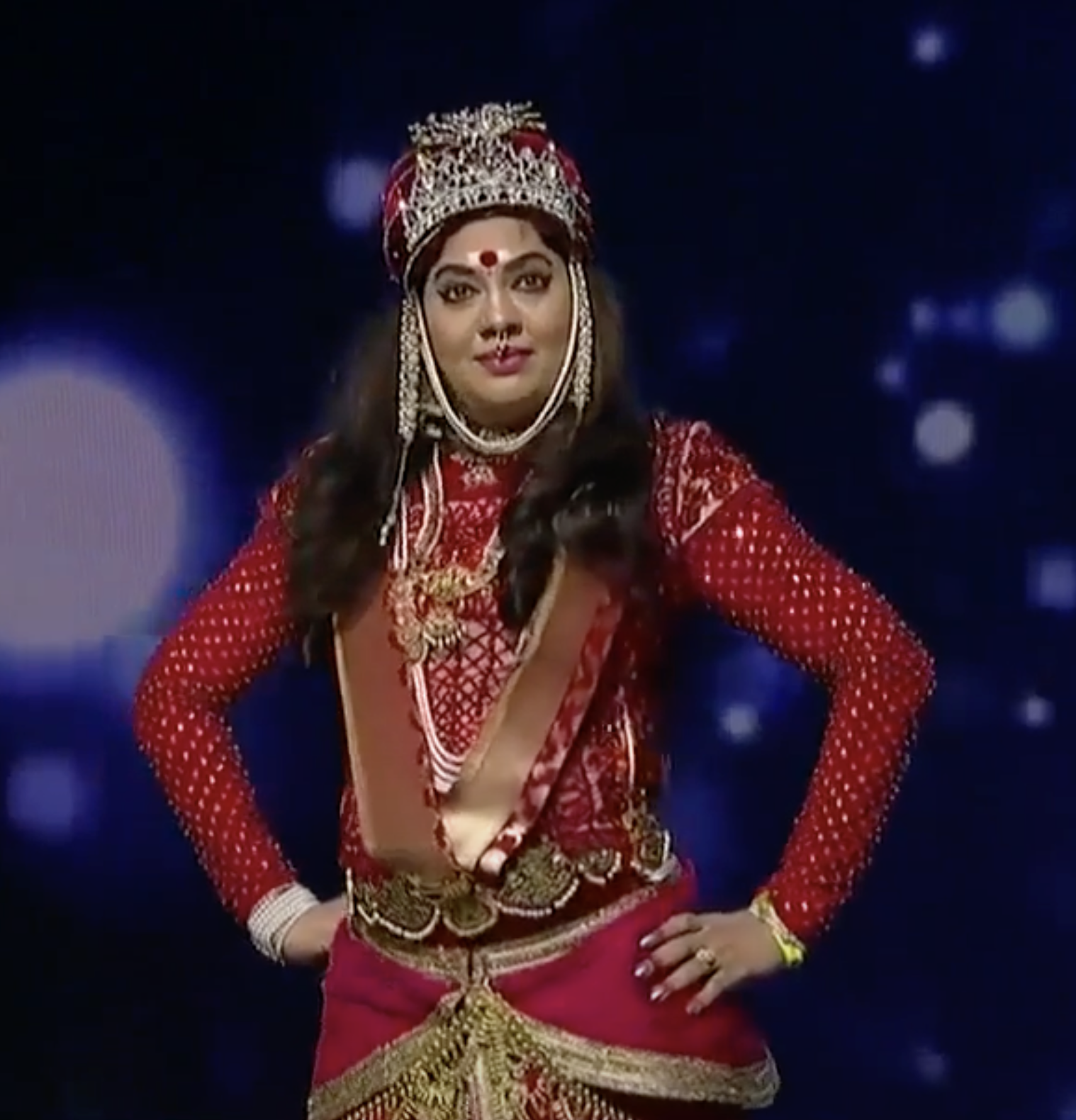
- Reddy performing Kakatiyam in 2018
- Born: 1 January 1967 (age 59); Pamarru, Andhra Pradesh, India
- Occupation: Kuchipudi dancer
- Children: 1
- Relatives: Gaddam Ganga Reddy (father-in-law)
- Awards: See Awards

Gaddam Padmaja Reddy (born 1 January 1967) is an Indian Kuchipudi exponent and music teacher. She performs ballets on mythological themes and contemporary social issues. She choreographed Kakatiyam, a Kuchipudi visual dance form. She was conferred with Kala Ratna in 2006, India's highest art award–Sangeet Natak Akademi Award in 2015 and Padma Shri, India's fourth highest civilian award, in the field of art for 2022.

== Early life ==
Padmaja Reddy was born on 1 January 1967 in a Reddy family to G. V. Reddy and Swarajyalakshmi in Pamarru, Krishna district in Andhra Pradesh. She grew up at her grandparents house in Pamarru. She later moved to Hyderabad. Her family lived in Yousufguda. She was educated in St. Theresa School and then in Reddy College. She graduated in Bachelor of Arts.

== Kuchipudi dance ==
Reddy trained in Kuchipudi from Shobha Naidu. Reddy gained recognition for her performance in the roles of Satyabhama and Rudrama Devi. In an interview, she said she wanted to perform on a unique topic rather than the mythological stories, which are in common occurrences. She developed and performed several Kuchipudi dance forms that build awareness on contemporary social issues, some of which includes the ballets Bruna Hatyalu, Jagruthi, Vajra Bharati, Namaste India, Season of Flowers. Bruna Hatyalu condemns female foeticides–selective abortions of female babies, Jagruthi explores issues surrounding HIV/AIDS and Vajra Bharati tries to ignite the ethos of national integrity among people. Apart from social issues, she performs in ballets involving mythology. Some of her mythological works include Bhamakalapam, Mahishashura Mardhini, Navadurgalu and Kakatiyam.

She teaches Kuchipudi at "Pranav Institute of Kuchipudi Dance" academy, named after her son Pranav.

== Kakatiyam ==
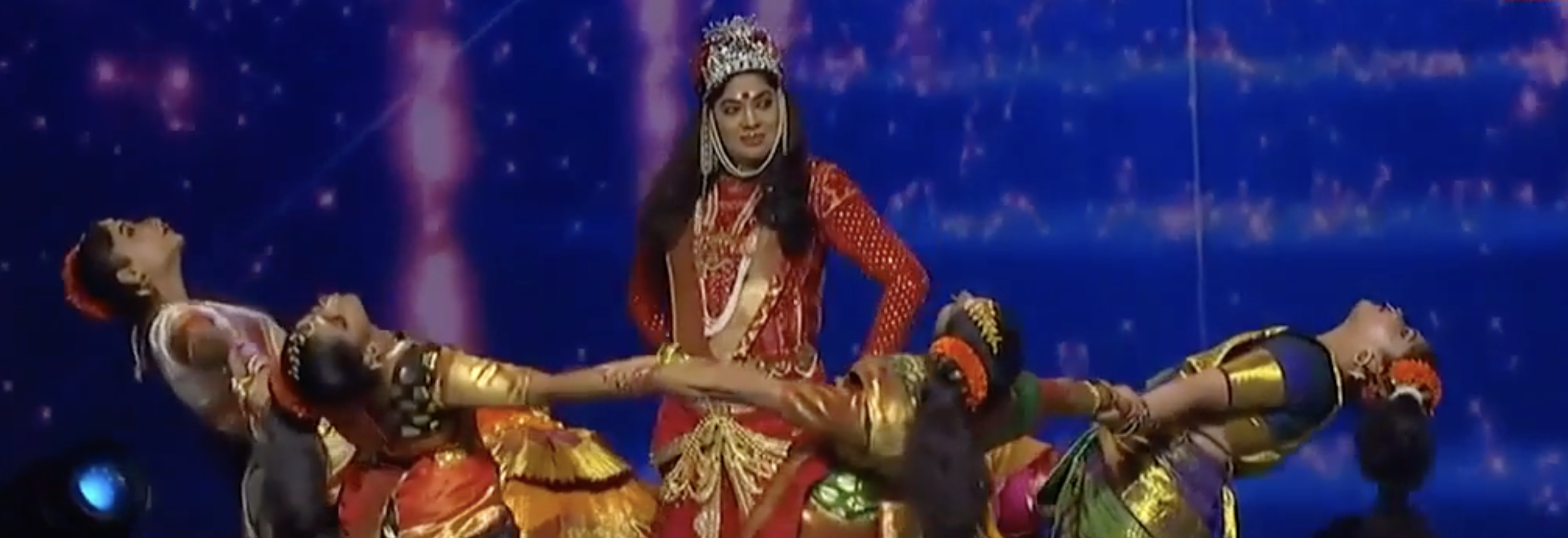
Reddy performing Kakatiyam in 2018 in the character of Rudrama Devi

Reddy said in an interview that she wanted to develop a classical dance form that is based culture of Telangana. She developed Kakatiyam, a two-part Kuchipudi classical visual dance form based on the history and themes of Ramappa Temple, sculpture and dance forms during the period of Kakatiya dynasty. She said the dance concept was based on her research on the Ramappa Temple, Thousand Pillar Temple and Warangal Fort in formatting the dance form. According to her, it is based on Nritta Ratnavali – a book written by Jayapa Senani, a military commander of the Kakatiyas, documenting the dance forms of 13th century.

She performed the role of Rudrama Devi, queen of the Kakatiya dynasty. The first part of the dance was performed in February 2017 and the second part was presented in December 2021, both in Shilpakala Vedika in Hyderabad. According to Reddy, the split of the ballet in two parts was due to the vastness of the dance concepts documented in Nritta Ratnavali and only some of them were chosen due to "budget and feasibility".

"I am just sowing the seed, nurturing and letting it grow is everyone’s responsibility. I consider the hurdles as my stepping stones and nothing would stop me from taking this art form to the people of Telangana."

— Padmaja Reddy on her intentions about Kakatiyam

Reddy said she plans to further study the book and present the dance concepts in future performances, which were currently omitted in the two-part play.

== Other work ==
Reddy worked as a member of National Tourism Advisory Council in 2012 and had been a member of the General Assembly of Indian Council of Cultural Relations.

== Awards ==
Reddy was conferred several honours and awards. Prominent ones include the doctorate degree from Sri Krishnadevaraya University in 2005 and an honorary doctorate by Sri Padmavati Mahila Visvavidyalayam in 2022. In 2006, she was awarded with Kala Ratna by the united Andhra Pradesh government. She was awarded the Sangeet Natak Akademi Award, the highest award in arts in India, for her contributions to Kuchipudi in 2015 and became the first dancer from Telangana to receive the award. Later in 2022, the Government of India conferred her with Padma Shri, the country's fourth highest civilian award, in the field of arts.

== Personal life ==
Padmaja Reddy married Gaddam Srinivas Reddy in 1988, who is a son of Gaddam Ganga Reddy, former Member of Parliament and Member of the Legislative Assembly. They have a son, Pranav. She resides in Begumpet, a neighbourhood in Hyderabad.
