= G. Vivekanand =

Indian politician

Gaddam Vivekanand

Minister for Labour, Employment Training & Factories, Mines & Geology
- Incumbent
- Assumed office 8 June 2025

Member of Telangana Legislative Assembly
- Incumbent
- Assumed office 3 December 2023
- Preceded by: Balka Suman
- Constituency: Chennur

Member of Parliament, Lok Sabha
- In office 16 May 2009 — 17 May 2014
- Preceded by: Gaddam Venkatswamy
- Succeeded by: Balka Suman
- Constituency: Peddapalli

Personal details
- Born: 30 November 1957 (age 68) Hyderabad
- Party: Indian National Congress (2023-present)
- Spouse: Saroja
- Relations: Gaddam Vinod Kumar (brother)
- Children: Vritika, Vamsi Gaddam, Vaishnavi, Venkat
- Parent(s): Gaddam Venkatswamy (father), Kalavathi (mother)

Gaddam Vivekanand (born 30 November 1957) also known as Gaddam Vivek Venkatswamy, is an Indian politician from Indian National Congress and former Member of Parliament in the 15th Lok Sabha. He represented Peddapalli parliamentary constituency.

During November 2023, Vivek Venkataswamy officially stepped down from the BJP and rejoined the Congress party, along with his son Vamsi, during Rahul Gandhi's visit to Hyderabad. Earlier on 9 August 2019, he joined in Bharatiya Janata Party.

Vivek took oath as Minister in Revanth Reddy's Cabinet on Sunday 8 June 2025. He was allocated Labour, Employment Training & Factories, Mines & Geology ministries on 11 June 2025.

He was appointed In charge minister for Medak District on 12 June 2025.

== Electoral History ==
Year	Constituency	Party	Votes	%	Opponent	Party	Votes	%	Result	Margin	%
2009	Peddapalli	INC	3,13,748	34.69	Gomasa Srinivas	TRS	2,64,373	29.23	Won	+49,375	+5.46
2014	Peddapalli	INC	82,315	7.82	Balka Suman	TRS	3,73,328	35.48	Lost	-2,91,013	-27.66
2023	Chennur	INC	87,545	57.51	Balka Suman	BRS	30,030	19.73	Won	+57,515	+37.78

== Political timeline and affiliations ==
Year (Date)	Party	Note
2009	Indian National Congress	Elected as MP from Peddapalle
June 2, 2013	Telangana Rashtra Samithi	Joined during statehood movement
March 31, 2014	Indian National Congress	Rejoined INC
2016	Telangana Rashtra Samithi	Returned to TRS; Served as Govt Advisor
August 9, 2019	Bharatiya Janata Party	Joined BJP
November 1, 2023	Indian National Congress	Rejoined INC; Elected MLA

== Early life ==
Vivek Venkatswamy is the youngest son of veteran Indian National Congress member and former Member of Parliament Gaddam Venkatswamy and Kalavathi. He did his schooling from Hyderabad Public School, Begumpet and did his medicine, M.B.B.S, from Osmania Medical College. He belongs to Mala community. Growing up in a household deeply entrenched in public service, Vivek developed a strong sense of responsibility towards society, which shaped his future political career.

Vivek Venkatswamy is an Indian politician and social activist from Telangana. He is the son of Kaka Garu, a former three-time MLA, seven-time MP, and three-time Union Minister, and has followed in his father’s footsteps by serving as a Member of Parliament and a key figure in Telangana’s political landscape. Vivek is known for his leadership in the Telangana movement, his commitment to public welfare, and his role in continuing his family’s long-standing relationship with the Indian National Congress.

== Career ==
Gaddam Vivek was elected to the 15th Lok Sabha from Peddapalli Constituency, after his father did not run in the election. He was a member of coal committee and steel committee. Formerly, he is the adviser to the State Government of Telangana for Inter-State relations. He was elected the MLA of Chennur region of Mancherial District, Telangana, in 2023 for the Indian National Congress Party.

He is the vice chairman of Visaka industries. He is the promoter of the 24/7 Telugu news channel V6 News and the Telugu daily newspaper Velugu.

=== Political career ===
Vivek began his political career with the Indian National Congress and quickly rose to prominence due to his dedication to public service and his ability to connect with the masses. He served as a Member of Parliament from the Peddapalli constituency and has been involved in various social and political movements, most notably the Telangana movement. His leadership during the rail roko agitation and other significant protests played a key role in bringing attention to the cause of Telangana's statehood.

=== Telangana movement and arrests ===
Vivek was one of the prominent leaders advocating for a separate Telangana state. His involvement in the Telangana agitation, including leading dharnas and protests, led to his arrest multiple times, most notably during the rail roko agitation. His dedication to the cause mirrored his father's commitment to the people, making him a respected figure in the region.

== Educational and social contributions ==
In line with his father’s vision, Vivek continues to support educational initiatives for the underprivileged. The college founded by his family educates over 5,000 students annually, without any donations, providing opportunities for underprivileged students to become leaders in society. Many alumni from the college have gone on to become IAS, IPS officers, and other significant public figures.

Through the Visaka Charitable Trust, Vivek has overseen the distribution of over 100 crore rupees towards social welfare initiatives such as building water borewells, schools, and promoting women’s entrepreneurship. His focus on community empowerment and education has had a lasting impact on underdeveloped areas in Telangana.

== Rejoining Congress and electoral contributions ==
After a brief hiatus from the Congress Party, Vivek re-entered politics under the leadership of Mallikarjun Kharge and played a pivotal role in ensuring the Congress Party's success in Pedapalli and other key constituencies in Telangana. His financial contribution of 3 crore rupees to the party during the 2014 elections was a crucial factor in Congress’ campaign. Vivek’s efforts helped the Congress Party win seven important seats in Pedapalli, contributing to forming the government in Telangana.

== Political challenges and ED raid ==
In recent years, Vivek faced political and legal challenges, including an ED raid on his properties. Despite these obstacles, he remained steadfast in his political commitments and continued to work for the betterment of his constituency and the party. His resilience has been a defining feature of his political career.

== Ongoing contributions ==
Vivek Venkatswamy continues to carry forward the legacy of his father, Kaka Garu, through his commitment to public service, education, and social justice. His leadership in Telangana's political and social landscape is recognized for its integrity and dedication to empowering the underprivileged. Vivek remains a key figure in the Indian National Congress and continues to influence the political future of Telangana.

=== President of the Hyderabad Cricket Association ===
He was appointed the president of the Hyderabad Cricket Association in 2017. He was removed from the post in 2018 due to conflict of interest. He started the Telangana T20 League, which was not recognized by the Board of Control for Cricket in India.

== Positions held ==
- President, Hyderabad cricket association
- Member of Parliament, 15th Lok Sabha
- Member, Committee on Coal and Steel
- Chairman, Confederation of Indian Industry, A.P. Chapter, (2006–2007)
- Chairman, Manufacturers Association
- Vivek is the promoter and vice chairman of the Visaka group of companies.
