= Nennal =

- Mandal
- Location in Telangana, India Nennal (India)
- Coordinates: 19°08′38″N 79°43′00″E
- Country: India
- State: Telangana
- District: Adilabad
- Time zone: UTC+5:30 (IST)
- Vehicle registration: TS
- Website: telangana.gov.in

Nennal is a Mandal in Mancherial district in the state of Telangana in India.

== Administrative divisions ==
There are 21 villages in Nennal

Sl.No.	Name of the Mandal	Villages in the Mandal	Name of the Erstwhile Mandals from which the present Mandal is formed
1	Nennel	Nennal	Nennel
2	Nennel	Manneguda	Nennel
3	Nennel	Konampet	Nennel
4	Nennel	Kushenapalle	Nennel
5	Nennel	Jangalpet	Nennel
6	Nennel	Dammireddipet	Nennel
7	Nennel	Kharji	Nennel
8	Nennel	Gollapalle	Nennel
9	Nennel	Nandulapalle	Nennel
10	Nennel	Ghanpur	Nennel
11	Nennel	Jogapur	Nennel
12	Nennel	Gundlasomaram	Nennel
13	Nennel	Metpalle	Nennel
14	Nennel	Mailaram	Nennel
15	Nennel	Awadam	Nennel
16	Nennel	Chittapur	Nennel
17	Nennel	Gudipet	Nennel
18	Nennel	Jhandavenkatapur	Nennel
19	Nennel	Chinavenkatapur	Nennel
20	Nennel	Pottiyal	Nennel
21	Nennel	Kothur	Nennel
