= Chennur Assembly constituency =

Constituency of the Telangana legislative assembly in India

Coordinates: 18.85°N 79.79°E

Chennur
- Constituency No. 2 for the Telangana Legislative Assembly
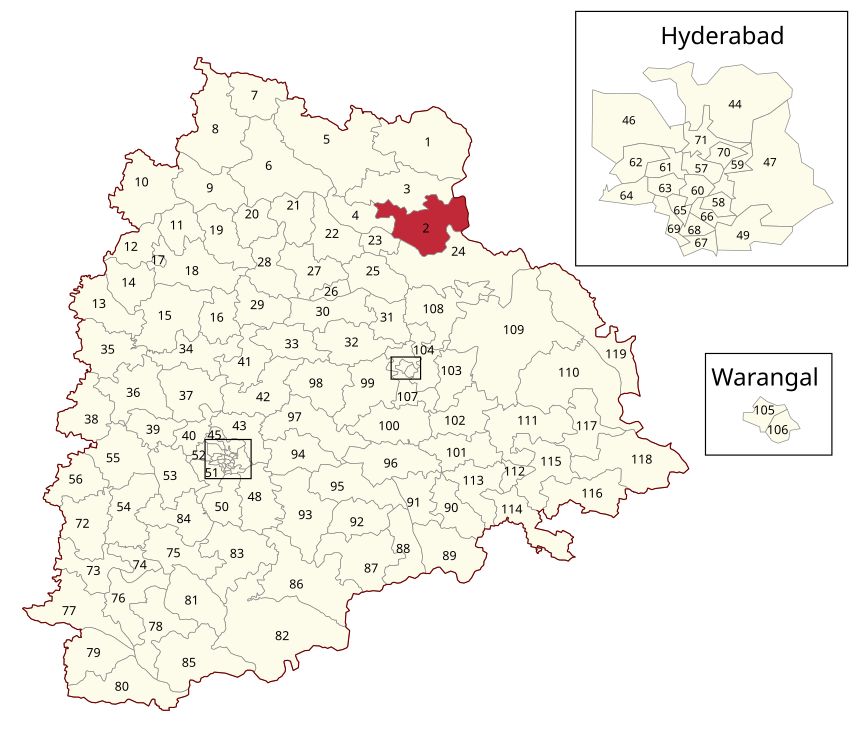
- Location of Chennur Assembly constituency within Telangana

Constituency details
- Country: India
- Region: South India
- State: Telangana
- District: Mancherial
- Lok Sabha constituency: Peddapalli
- Total electors: 1,49,679
- Reservation: SC

Member of Legislative Assembly
- 3rd Telangana Legislative Assembly
- Incumbent Gaddam Vivekanand
- Party: Indian National Congress
- Elected year: 2023

Chennur Assembly constituency is one of the 119 constituencies of the Telangana Legislative Assembly, India. Initially it was a two-member constituency before 1962; it was later created as a single-member constituency in the year 1962. It is one of three constituencies in Mancherial district. Chennur is located in the south of the district. It comes under Peddapally Lok Sabha constituency.

Gaddam Vivekanand of Indian National Congress is currently representing the constituency.

== Mandals ==
The Assembly Constituency presently comprises the following Mandals:

Mandal
Chennur
Mandamarri
Kotapally
Jaipur
Bheemaram

== Members of the Legislative Assembly ==
Election	Member	Party
1962	Kodati Rajamallu	Indian National Congress
1967	Kodati Rajamallu	Indian National Congress
1972	Kodati Rajamallu	Indian National Congress
1978	C. Narayana	Indian National Congress
1983	Sothuku Sanjeev Rao	Telugu Desam Party
1985	Boda Janardhan	Telugu Desam Party
1989	Boda Janardhan	Telugu Desam Party
1994	Boda Janardhan	Telugu Desam Party
1999	Boda Janardhan	Telugu Desam Party
2004	Gaddam Vinod Kumar	Indian National Congress
2009	Nallala Odelu	Bharat Rashtra Samithi
2014	Nallala Odelu	Bharat Rashtra Samithi
2018	Balka Suman	Bharat Rashtra Samithi
2023	G. Vivekanand	Indian National Congress

Andhra Pradesh

== Election results ==
=== Assembly Election 2023 ===
2023 Telangana Legislative Assembly election : Chennur
Party	Candidate	Votes	%	±%
INC	G. Vivekanand	87,541	57.51%	▲24.67
BRS	Balka Suman	50,026	32.86%	New
BJP	Durgam Ashok	3,375	2.22%	▲0.70
Independent	Thungapindi Ramesh	2,166	1.42%	New
NOTA	None of the above	1,792	1.18%	▼0.42
Independent	Asampelly Sampath Kumar	1,444	0.95%	New
BSP	Dasarapu Srinivas	1,398	0.92%	▲0.02
Dharma Samaj Party	Nandipati Raju	948	0.62%	New
Margin of victory		37,515	24.64%	▲3.57
Turnout		152,246	80.80%	▼1.78
Total valid votes		152,230		
Registered electors		188,417		▲14.68
INC gain from BRS		Swing	▲3.60	

=== Assembly Election 2018 ===
2018 Telangana Legislative Assembly election : Chennur
Party	Candidate	Votes	%	±%
BRS	Balka Suman	71,980	53.91%	▲2.47
INC	Venkatesh Netha Borlakunta	43,848	32.84%	▲2.15
RPI(K)	Sogala Sanjeev	6,274	4.70%	New
BJP	Andugula Srinivas	2,026	1.52%	▼4.73
Independent	Damuka Suresh Babu	1,492	1.12%	New
Pyramid Party of India	Bojja Ramana Kumari	1,335	1.00%	New
BSP	Sujatha Surepally	1,200	0.90%	▼0.37
Nava Praja Rajyam Party	Rakesh Regunta	1,035	0.78%	New
Bahujana Left Party	Boda Janardhan	983	0.74%	New
Independent	Cheepelli Kiran	937	0.70%	New
Margin of victory		28,132	21.07%	▲0.32
Turnout		135,679	82.58%	▲9.49
Total valid votes		133,529		
Registered electors		164,296		▼5.98
BRS hold		Swing	▲2.47	

=== Assembly Election 2014 ===
2014 Telangana Legislative Assembly election : Chennur
Party	Candidate	Votes	%	±%
BRS	Nallala Odelu	64,867	51.44%	▲11.46
INC	Gaddam Vinod	38,703	30.69%	▲0.97
BJP	Ram Venu	7,879	6.25%	▲3.72
Republican Paksha (Khoripa)	Sogala Sanjeev	5,711	4.53%	New
NOTA	None of the above	1,616	1.28%	New
BSP	Thungapindi Ramesh	1,607	1.27%	New
Independent	Seggam Rajeshwar	1,415	1.12%	New
Independent	Medapaka Sathish	1,069	0.85%	New
Independent	Thogari Banesh	1,064	0.84%	New
Yuvajana Sramika Rythu Congress Party	Mekala Prameela	843	0.67%	New
Margin of victory		26,164	20.75%	▲10.49
Turnout		127,732	73.09%	▼1.94
Total valid votes		126,105		
Registered electors		174,748		▲16.42
BRS hold		Swing	▲11.46	

=== Assembly Election 2009 ===
2009 Andhra Pradesh Legislative Assembly election : Chennur
Party	Candidate	Votes	%	±%
BRS	Nallala Odelu	45,012	39.98%	New
INC	G. Vinod	33,463	29.72%	▼30.91
PRP	Andugula Srinivas	20,902	18.57%	New
BJP	Arumulla Posham	2,843	2.53%	New
LSP	Mekala Saroja	2,780	2.47%	New
Independent	Volapu Srinivas	2,646	2.35%	New
Independent	Ponnala Vinay Kumar	2,103	1.87%	New
Independent	Jadi Yesaiah	1,953	1.73%	New
JD(S)	Jadi Mallaiah	877	0.78%	▼0.50
Margin of victory		11,549	10.26%	▼18.61
Turnout		112,622	75.03%	▲4.11
Total valid votes		112,579		
Registered electors		150,107		▼16.46
BRS gain from INC		Swing	▼20.65	

=== Assembly Election 2004 ===
2004 Andhra Pradesh Legislative Assembly election : Chennur
Party	Candidate	Votes	%	±%
INC	Gaddam Vinod Kumar	77,240	60.63%	▲24.55
TDP	Boda Janardhan	40,459	31.76%	▼10.74
BSP	Jangli Ganganna	1,954	1.53%	New
JD(S)	Jhadi Mallaiah	1,631	1.28%	New
Independent	Jhadi Yesaiah	1,541	1.21%	New
Independent	Durgam Shivaram	985	0.77%	New
Independent	Maddela Pocham	906	0.71%	New
Independent	Olepu Srinivas	859	0.67%	New
Margin of victory		36,781	28.87%	▲22.45
Turnout		127,420	70.92%	▲3.66
Total valid votes		127,395		
Rejected ballots		25	0.02%	▼5.64
Registered electors		179,673		▲1.44
INC gain from TDP		Swing	▲18.13	

=== Assembly Election 1999 ===
1999 Andhra Pradesh Legislative Assembly election : Chennur
Party	Candidate	Votes	%	±%
TDP	Boda Janardhan	47,764	42.50%	▼23.28
INC	G. Vinod	40,544	36.08%	▲8.95
CPI	Bandas Ponaganti	18,758	16.69%	New
Independent	Kodati Pradeep	2,826	2.51%	New
Marxist Communist Party of India (S.S.Srivastava)	Vijaya Laxmi	1,857	1.65%	New
Margin of victory		7,220	6.42%	▼32.23
Turnout		119,123	67.26%	▼4.74
Total valid votes		112,382		
Rejected ballots		6,741	5.66%	▲2.10
Registered electors		177,119		▲11.56
TDP hold		Swing	▼23.28	

=== Assembly Election 1994 ===
1994 Andhra Pradesh Legislative Assembly election : Chennur
Party	Candidate	Votes	%	±%
TDP	Boda Janardhan	72,520	65.78%	▲16.81
INC	Sothuku Sanjeev Rao	29,912	27.13%	▼5.93
BSP	Nallala Odeiah	2,971	2.70%	New
BJP	Arumulla Posham	2,724	2.47%	New
Independent	Byirumalla Mogilaiah	1,394	1.26%	New
Margin of victory		42,608	38.65%	▲22.74
Turnout		114,315	72.00%	▲25.51
Total valid votes		110,241		
Rejected ballots		4,074	3.56%	▼3.73
Registered electors		158,764		▲9.04
TDP hold		Swing	▲16.81	

=== Assembly Election 1989 ===
1989 Andhra Pradesh Legislative Assembly election : Chennur
Party	Candidate	Votes	%	±%
TDP	Boda Janardhan	30,733	48.97%	▼11.43
INC	K. Pradeep	20,749	33.06%	▲1.76
Independent	S. Sanjeeva Rao	7,500	11.95%	New
Independent	Dharmapuri Ramaiah	2,144	3.42%	New
Independent	Guda Chandraiah	1,634	2.60%	New
Margin of victory		9,984	15.91%	▼13.19
Turnout		67,695	46.49%	▼10.54
Total valid votes		62,760		
Rejected ballots		4,935	7.29%	▲5.11
Registered electors		145,597		▲26.58
TDP hold		Swing	▼11.43	

=== Assembly Election 1985 ===
1985 Andhra Pradesh Legislative Assembly election : Chennur
Party	Candidate	Votes	%	±%
TDP	Boda Janardhan	38,757	60.40%	New
INC	K. Devaki Devi	20,086	31.30%	▼4.68
Independent	Dharmapuri Ramaiah	3,818	5.95%	New
Independent	Byirumalla Mogilaiah	873	1.36%	New
Independent	Dasari Lingaiah	400	0.62%	New
Margin of victory		18,671	29.10%	▲19.33
Turnout		65,597	57.03%	▼6.88
Total valid votes		64,169		
Rejected ballots		1,428	2.18%	▼2.49
Registered electors		115,025		▲11.97
TDP gain from Independent		Swing	▲14.65	

=== Assembly Election 1983 ===
1983 Andhra Pradesh Legislative Assembly election : Chennur
Party	Candidate	Votes	%	±%
Independent	Sothuku Sanjeev Rao	28,631	45.75%	New
INC	K. Devaki Devi	22,515	35.98%	▲14.04
Independent	Thangaram Gaddaiah	2,407	3.85%	New
Independent	Undeti Swamy	1,974	3.15%	New
JP	Thungapindi Mallesham	1,712	2.74%	▼20.48
Independent	C. Narayana	1,612	2.58%	New
Independent	M. Shankaraiah	1,581	2.53%	New
Independent	Ondara Dharmaji	578	0.92%	New
Independent	Mentari Ramanna	507	0.81%	New
Independent	Bharimalle Mogliah	499	0.80%	New
Margin of victory		6,116	9.77%	▼16.81
Turnout		65,649	63.91%	▲3.89
Total valid votes		62,584		
Rejected ballots		3,065	4.67%	▼0.05
Registered electors		102,728		▲14.84
Independent gain from INC(I)		Swing	▼4.05	

=== Assembly Election 1978 ===
1978 Andhra Pradesh Legislative Assembly election : Chennur
Party	Candidate	Votes	%	±%
INC(I)	C. Narayana	25,476	49.80%	New
JP	Votarikari Prabahkar	11,878	23.22%	New
INC	Tagaram Venkaty	11,223	21.94%	New
Independent	Chinthala Suryanarayana	2,276	4.45%	New
Margin of victory		13,598	26.58%	
Turnout		53,692	60.02%	
Total valid votes		51,159		
Rejected ballots		2,533	4.72%	
Registered electors		89,457		
INC(I) gain from INC		Swing		

=== Assembly Election 1972 ===
1972 Andhra Pradesh Legislative Assembly election : Chennur
Party	Candidate	Votes	%	±%
INC	Kodati Rajamallu	Unopposed		
Registered electors		79,452		▲15.60
INC hold		Swing		

=== Assembly Election 1967 ===
1967 Andhra Pradesh Legislative Assembly election : Chennur
Party	Candidate	Votes	%	±%
INC	Kodati Rajamallu	17,328	46.09%	▼25.49
Independent	Rajamallaiah	14,645	38.95%	New
ABJS	D. Muthaiah	4,093	10.89%	New
Independent	Narayana	1,534	4.08%	New
Margin of victory		2,683	7.14%	▼43.46
Turnout		40,954	59.59%	▲8.63
Total valid votes		37,600		
Registered electors		68,729		▲28.23
INC hold		Swing	▼25.49	

=== Assembly Election 1962 ===
1962 Andhra Pradesh Legislative Assembly election : Chennur
Party	Candidate	Votes	%	±%
INC	Kodati Rajamallu	18,629	71.58%	New
Independent	Chandayya	5,461	20.98%	New
Independent	Chikoti Babu Rao	1,934	7.43%	New
Margin of victory		13,168	50.60%	
Turnout		27,311	50.96%	
Total valid votes		26,024		
Registered electors		53,597		
INC win (new seat)				

== See also ==
- List of constituencies of Telangana Legislative Assembly
