= Nallala Odelu =

Indian politician and legislator

Member of Telangana Legislative Assembly
- In office 2009–2018
- Preceded by: G. Vinod
- Succeeded by: Balka Suman
- Constituency: Chennur

Personal details
- Born: Mandamarri
- Party: Indian National Congress
- Profession: Teacher (private school H.M)

Nallala Odelu is an Indian politician. He belongs to Indian National Congress. He is a former member of Telangana Legislative Assembly represented Chennur.

Odelu contested from Chennur Assembly from TRS Party in 2009, by polls of 2010, 2014. He served as Government Whip after he became MLA in 2014. In 2010, he tendered resignation to MLA post and won again in by-election. Odelu was denied the ticket in 2018 elections.
