= Kokkirala Premsagar Rao =

Indian politician

Kokkirala Prem Sagar Rao

Member of Telangana Legislative Assembly
- Incumbent
- Assumed office 2023
- Preceded by: Diwakar Rao Nadipelli
- Constituency: Mancherial

Member of Andhra Pradesh Legislative Council
- In office 2007 – 2013
- Constituency: Adilabad Local Body

Kokkirala Prem Sagar Rao is an Indian politician from Telangana. He is currently serving as member of Telangana Legislative Assembly representing Mancherial. He served as an MLC in the United Andhra Pradesh. He won the Mancherial Assembly election in 2023.

== Positions held ==
- PCC Member - 1999 to 2002
- PCC Secretary - 2002 to 2005
- TTD Board Member - 2004 to 2006
- Adilabad District DCCB Chairman - 2005 to 2007
- Adilabad District Local Bodies MLC - 2007 to 2013
- AICC Member – From 2018 to present
- Member of Legislative Assembly - 3 December 2023 to present
- Chairman - Telangana State Civil Supplies Corporation Ltd (31 October 2025- Incumbent)
