= Telangana =

State in southern India

- State
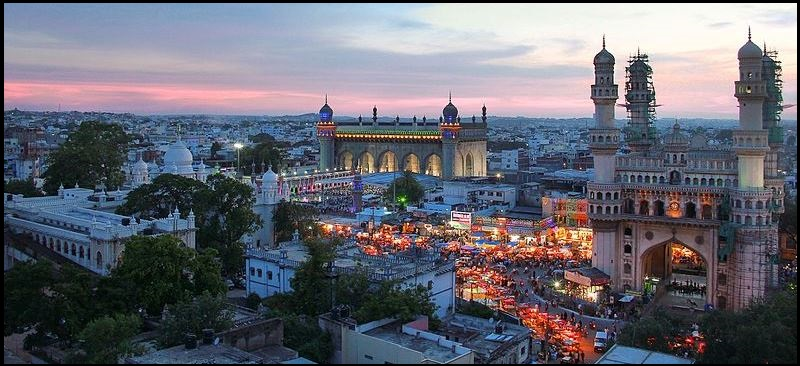
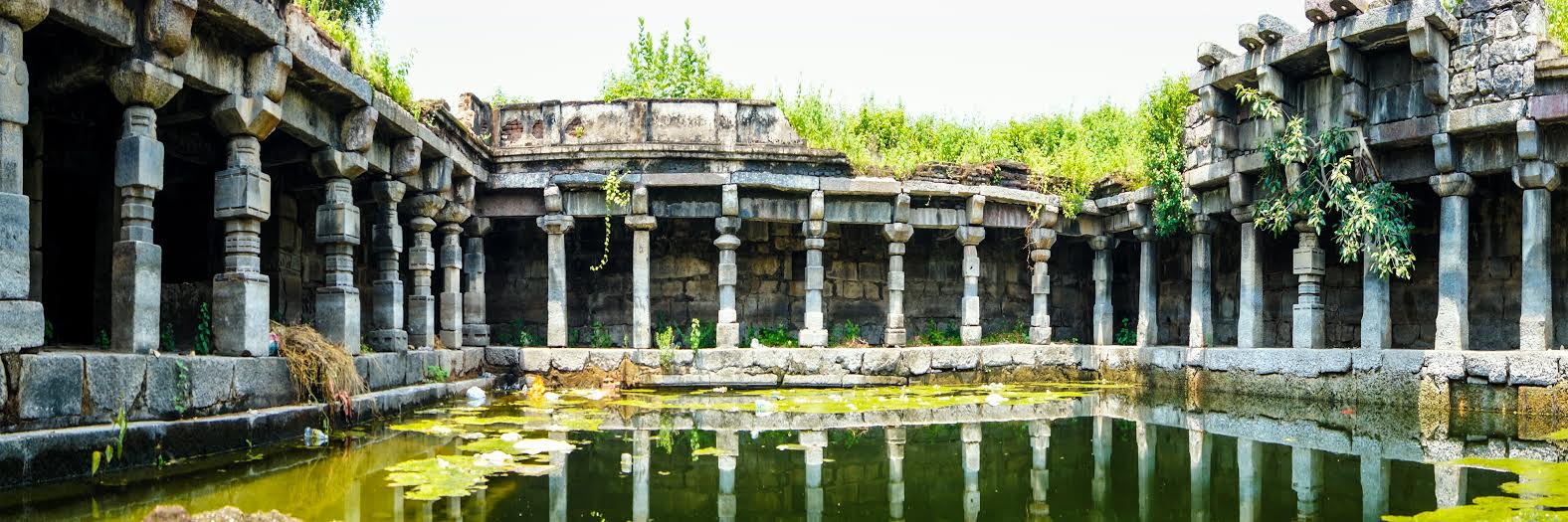
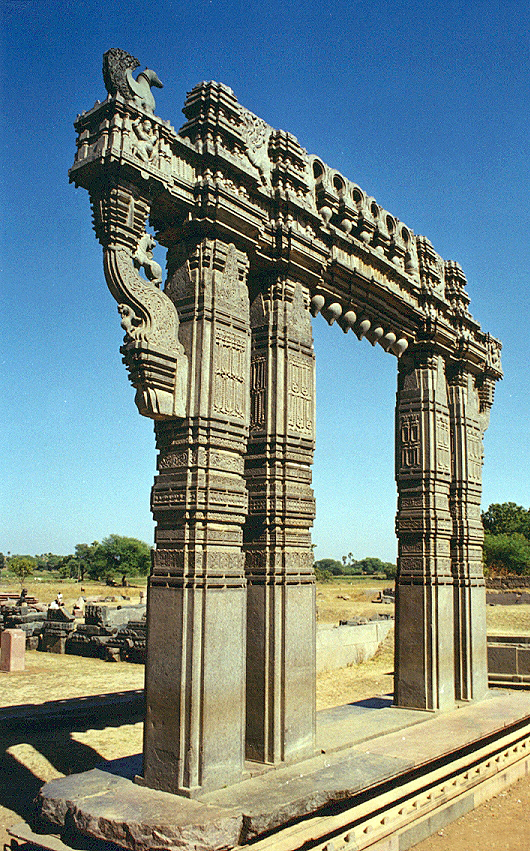
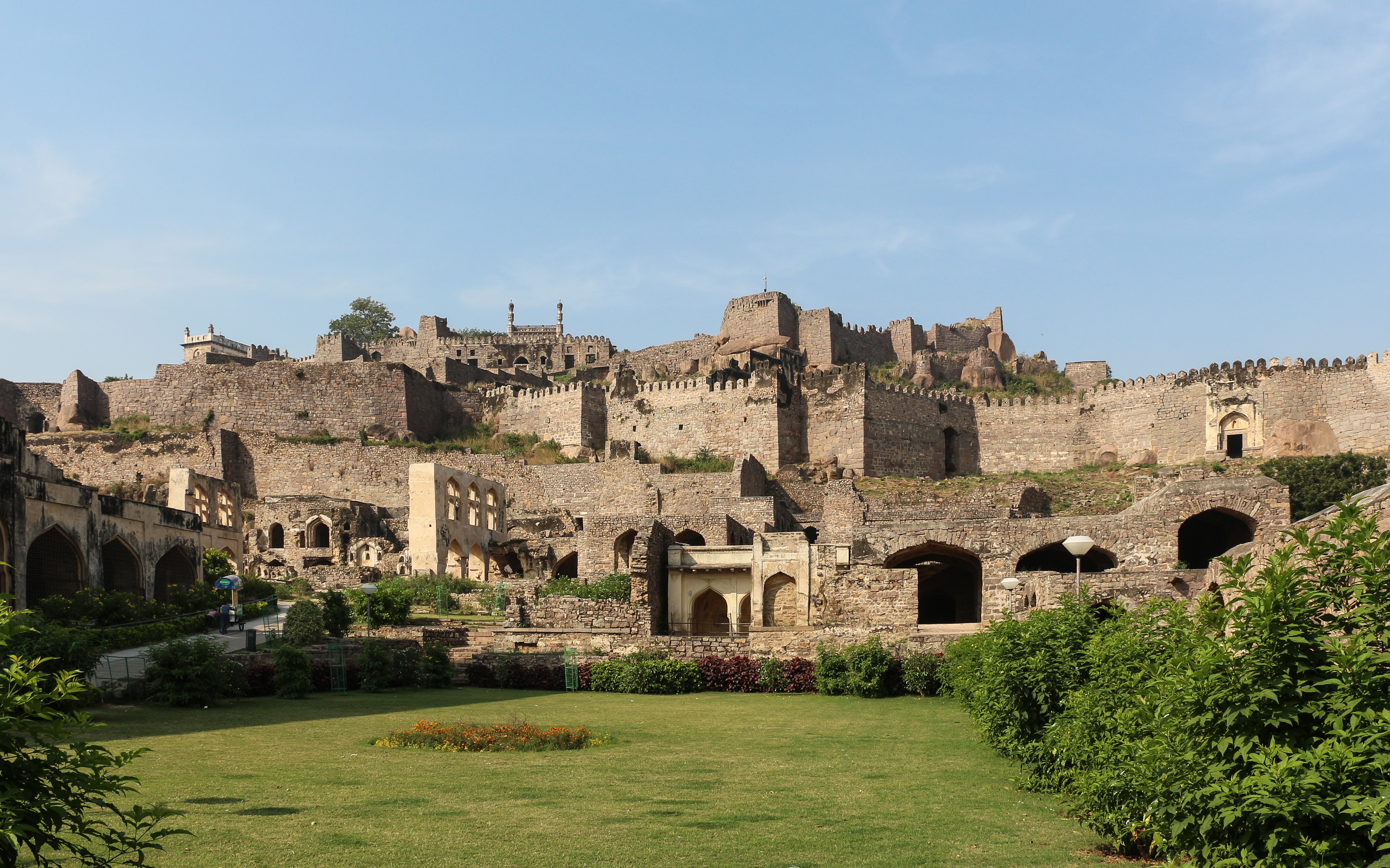
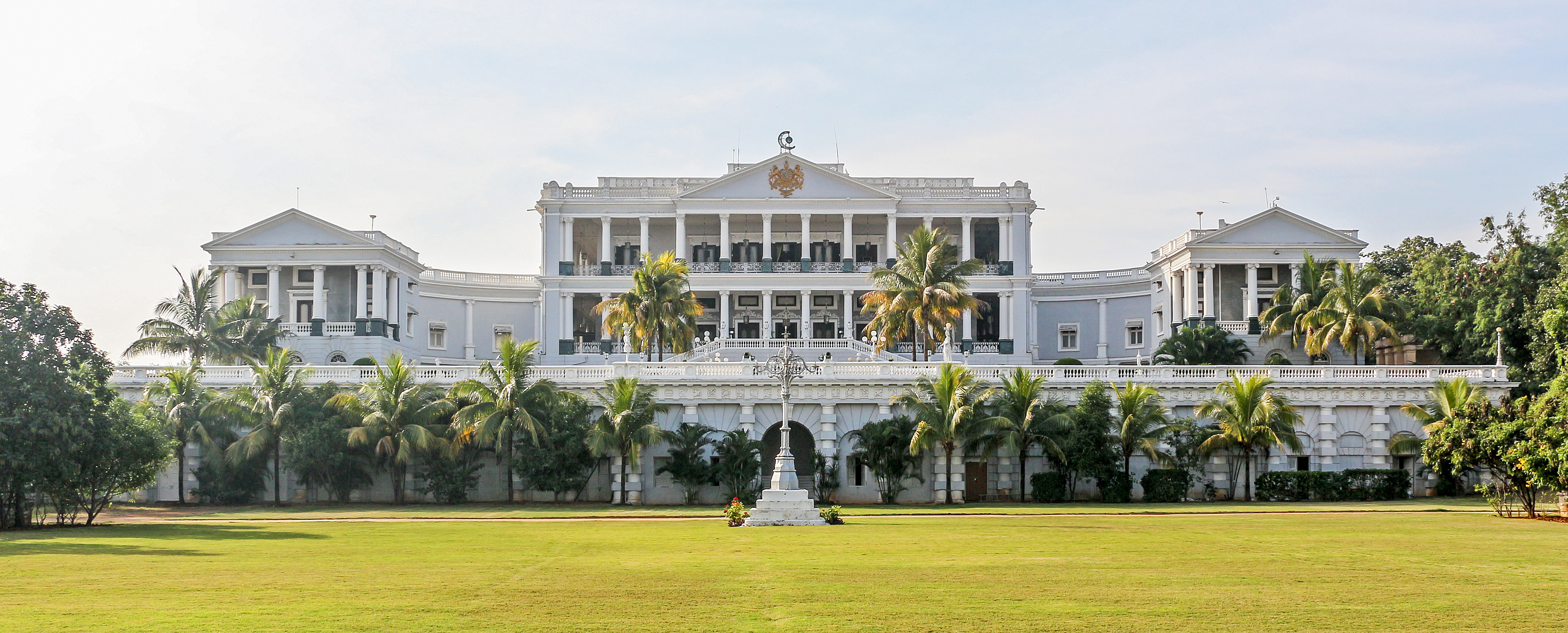
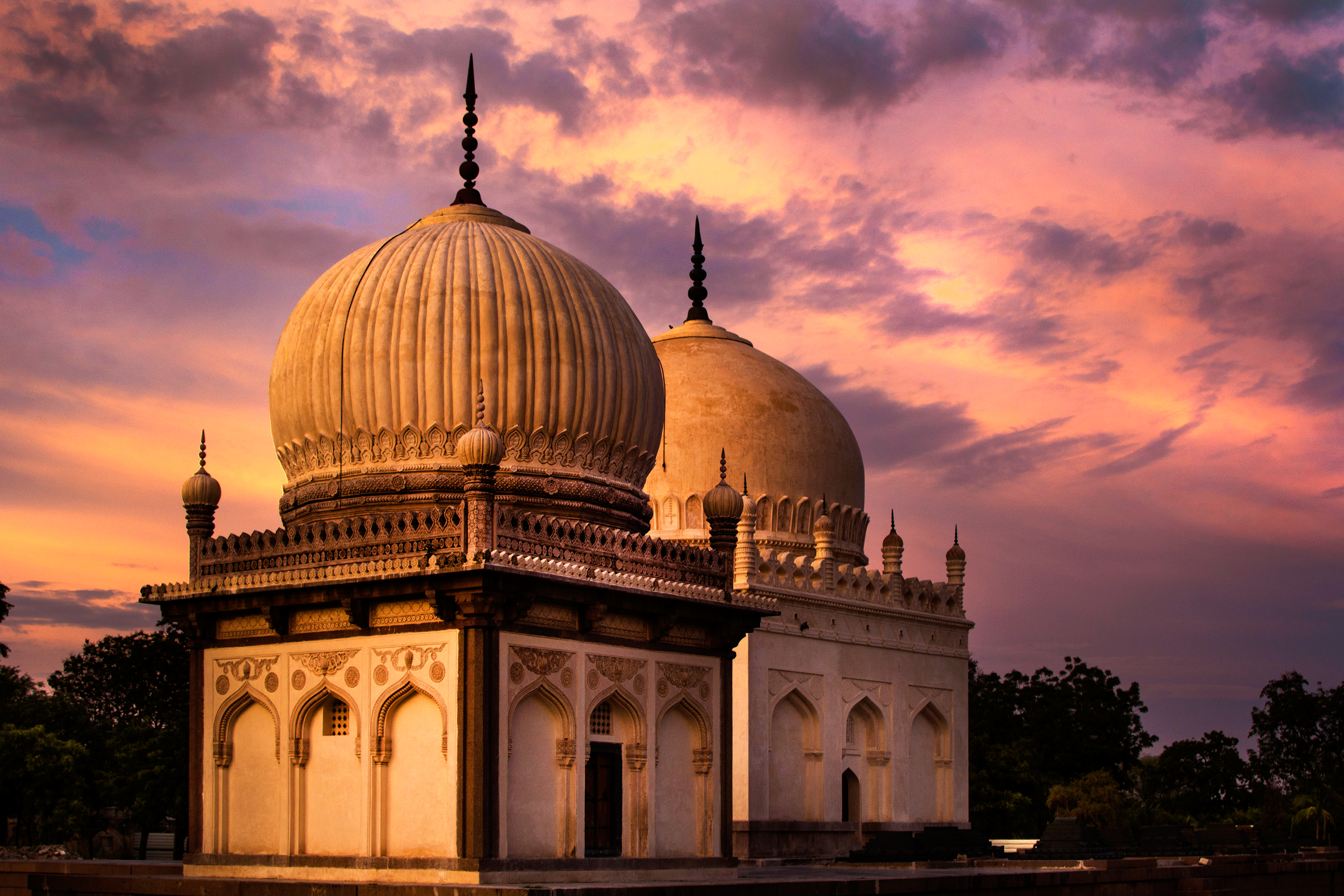
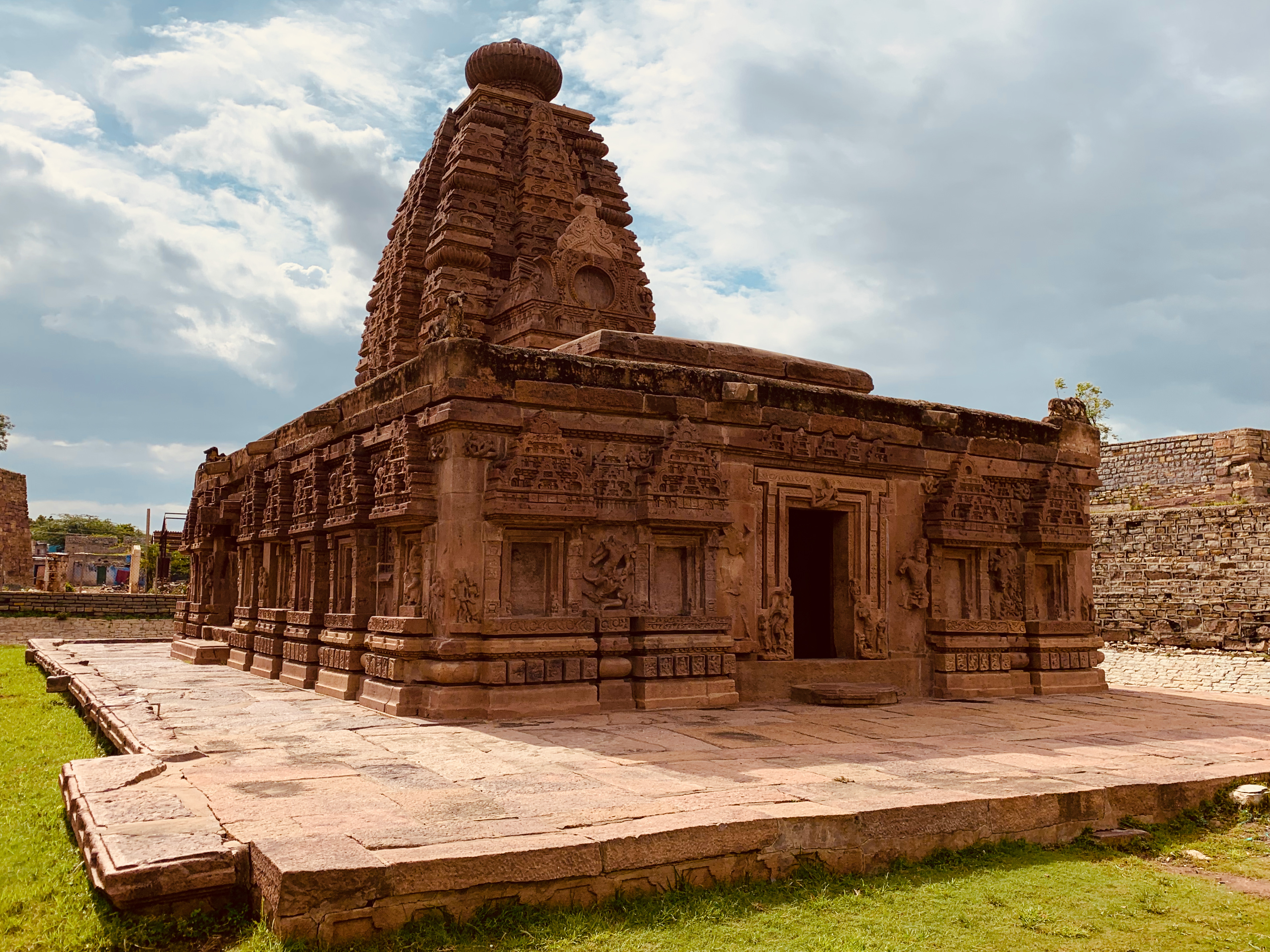
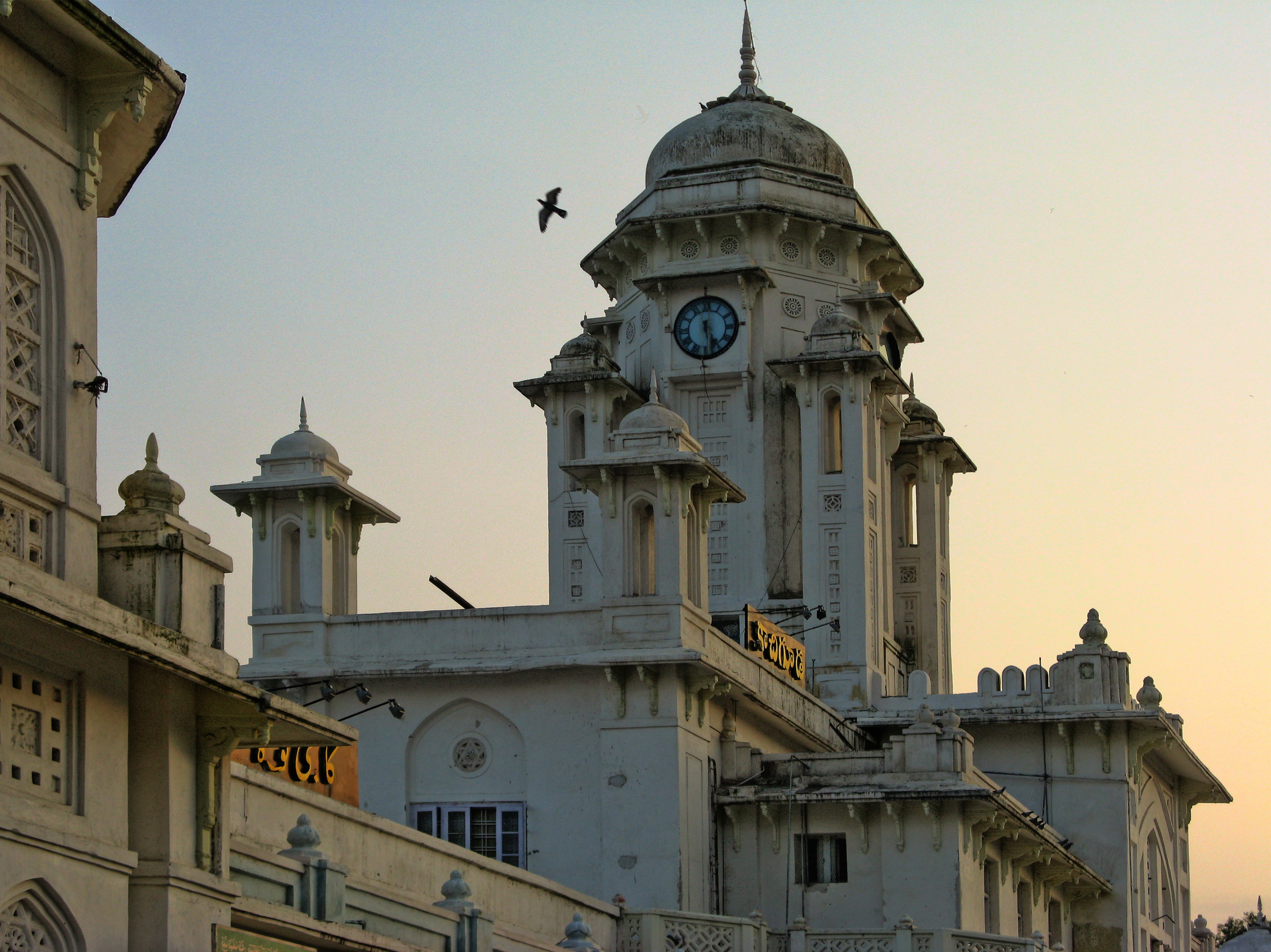
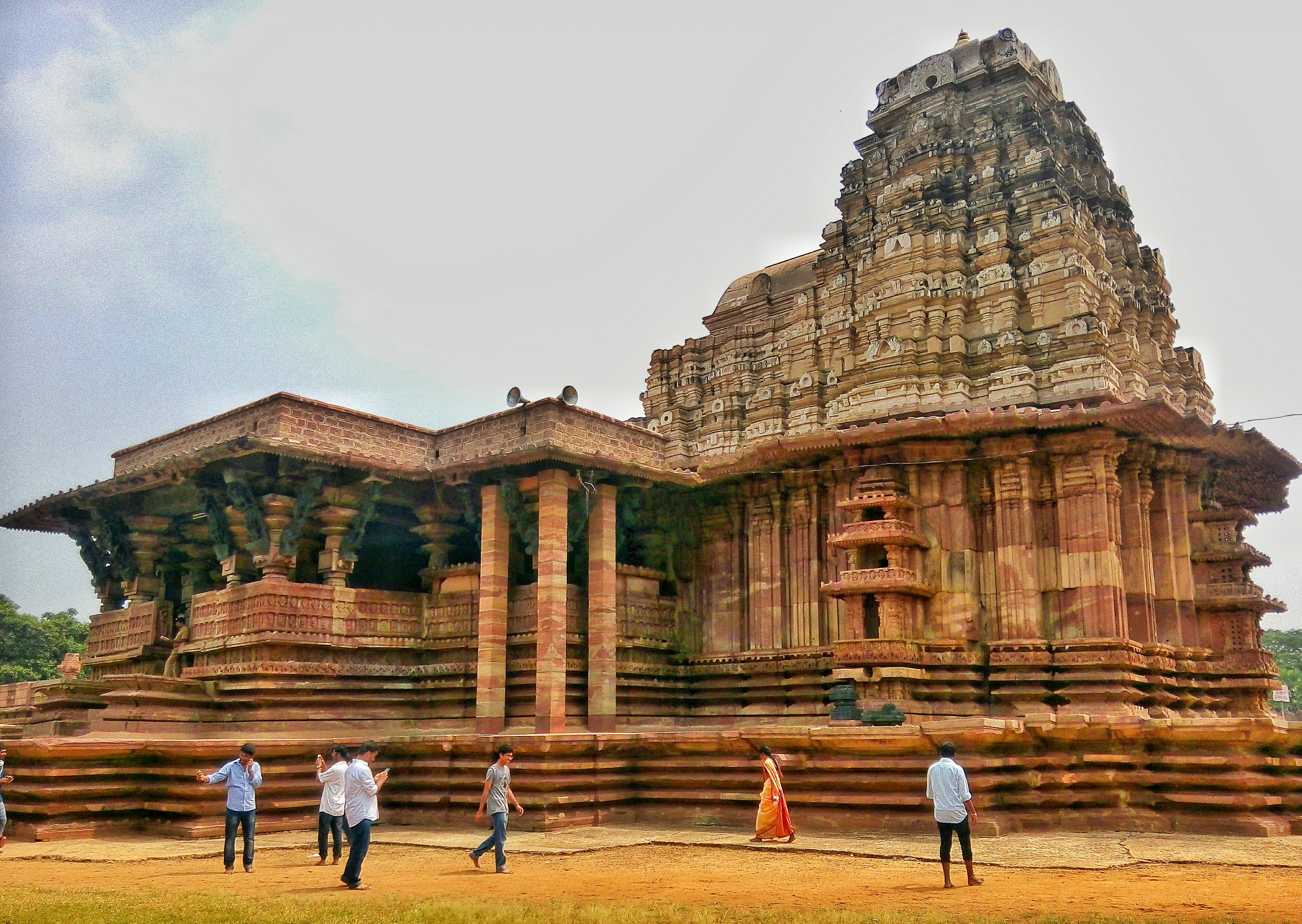
- Charminar Complex Kakatiya Wells Thousand Pillar Temple Warangal Gate Golconda Falaknuma Palace Qutub Shahi Tombs Vishwa Brahma Temple Kachiguda Railway Station Ramappa Temple

- Emblem of Telangana
- Etymology: teluṅgu āṇiyamu: "Telugu Country"; Trilinga desha: "Land of three lingas"; Telangadh: "South"
- Motto: Satyameva Jayate (Sanskrit) "Truth alone triumphs"
- Anthem: Jaya Jaya Hē Telangāṇa (Telugu) "Victory To Telangana"
- Location of Telangana in India
- Coordinates: 17.9°N 79.3°E
- Country: India
- Region: South India
- Previously was: Part of Andhra Pradesh
- Formation (by bifurcation): 2 June 2014 (12 years ago)
- Capital: Hyderabad
- Districts: 33

Government
  - Type: State Government
  - Body: Government of Telangana
  - Governor: Shiv Pratap Shukla
  - Chief Minister: Revanth Reddy (INC)
  - Deputy Chief Minister: Mallu Bhatti Vikramarka

Area
  - Total: 112,076 km^{2} (43,273 sq mi)
  - Rank: 11th

Dimensions
  - Length: 769 km (478 mi)
  - Width: 515 km (320 mi)
- Elevation: 256 m (840 ft)
- Highest elevation (Doli Gutta): 965 m (3,166 ft)

Population (2025)
  - Total: ▲38,499,000
  - Rank: 12th
  - Density: 312/km^{2} (810/sq mi)
  - Urban: 49.04%
  - Rural: 50.96%
- Demonym(s): Telaṅgāṇavāru, Teluguvāru

Language
  - Official: Telugu
  - Additional official: Urdu
  - Official script: Telugu script

GDP
  - Total (2026–27): ▲₹19.61 trillion (US$210 billion) (nominal) ▲$964.45 billion (PPP)
  - Rank: 8th
  - Per capita: ▲₹509,545 (US$5,400) (nominal) ▲$25,051 (PPP) (5th)
- Time zone: UTC+05:30 (IST)
- ISO 3166 code: IN-TS
- Vehicle registration: TG
- HDI (2023): ▲0.744 high (22nd)
- Literacy (2024): 76.9% (31st)
- Sex ratio (2025): 928♀/1000 ♂ (27th)
- Website: telangana.gov.in
- Symbols of Telangana
- Foundation day: Telangana Day
- Bird: Indian roller
- Flower: Senna auriculata
- Mammal: Spotted deer
- Tree: Prosopis cineraria
- State highway mark
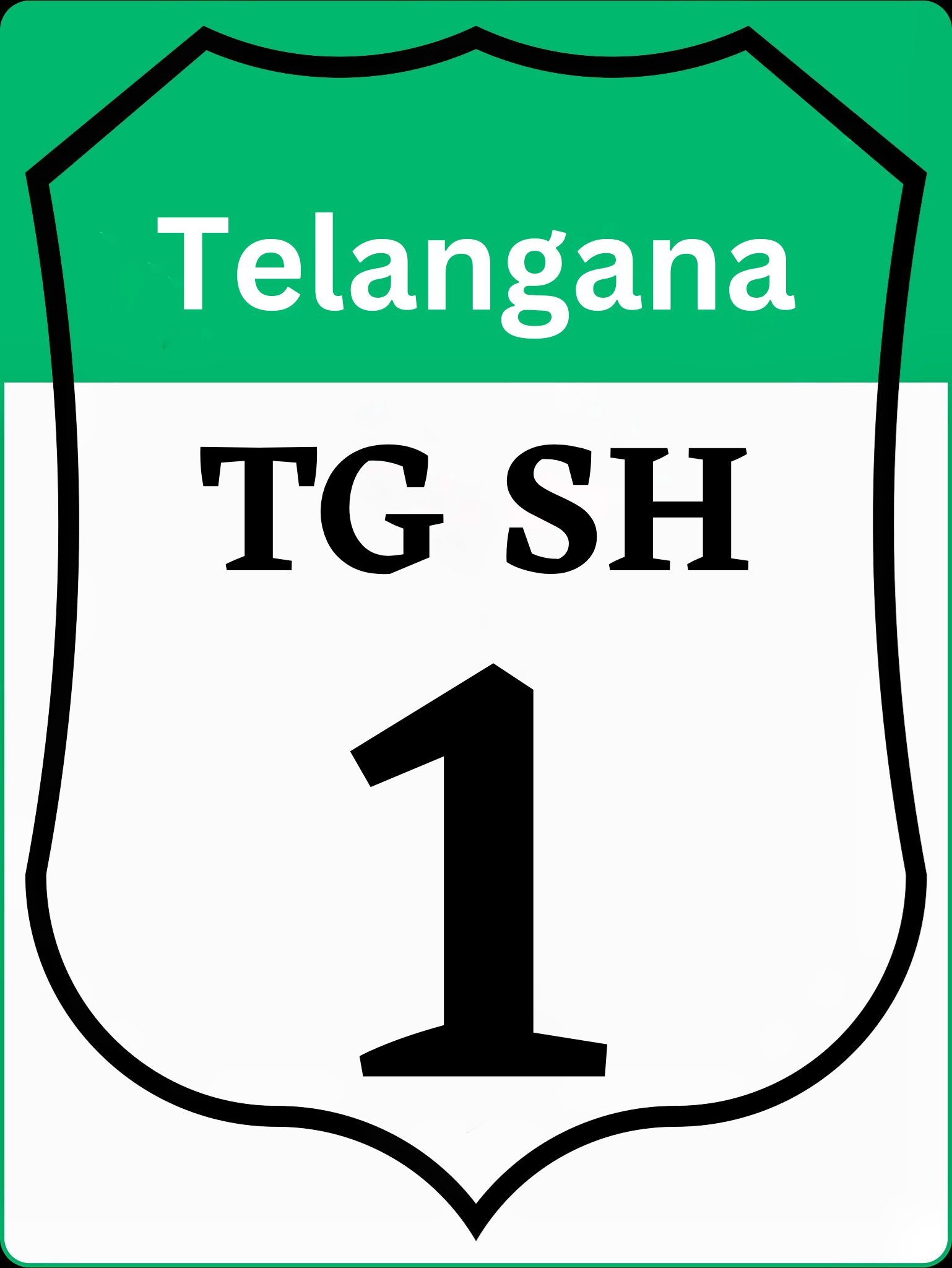
- State highway of Telangana; TG SH1 - TG SH24
- List of Indian state symbols

Telangana (Note: Telugu: Telaṅgāṇā, pronounced [ˈteləŋɡaːɳaː], ALA-LC: Tilaṉgānah; Urdu: [ˈtɪləŋɡɑːna]) is a state in southern India on the Deccan Plateau bordering Maharashtra and Chhattisgarh to the north and Andhra Pradesh and Karnataka to the south. It is the eleventh-largest and the twelfth-most-populated state of India. According to the Rigveda's Aitareya Brahmana, the region corresponding to Telangana has been inhabited by the Asmakas and Andhras since at least the 8th and 9th century BCE, respectively, with the later Satavahana dynasty, who ruled over the entire Deccan Plateau, establishing trade relations as far as the Roman Empire. Subsequent major dynasties include the Vishnukundinas, Eastern Chalukyas, Kakatiyas, the Vijayanagara Empire, Qutb Shahis, and Mughals followed by the British Raj. Following the Independence of India, the Telugu speaking regions of India were gradually regrouped within the state of Andhra Pradesh but after decades of protests and agitations, the Telangana movement obtained its bifurcation with the creation, in 2014, of the state of Telangana corresponding to the Telugu speaking regions of the Princely State of Hyderabad.

The state's capital is the city of Hyderabad. Telugu, one of the classical languages of India, is the most widely spoken and primary official language, while Urdu has been conferred second official language status. Additionally, several tribal languages such as Gondi, Kolami, Koya and Lambadi are spoken in different regions of the state.

With the eighth highest gross domestic product among Indian states, Telangana has emerged as a major focal point for IT software companies, fabric and textile industry, and the services sector. The state is also the main administrative center of many Indian defence aerospace and research labs including Bharat Dynamics Limited, Defence Metallurgical Research Laboratory, Defence Research and Development Organisation and Defence Research and Development Laboratory.

== Etymology ==
The word "Telinga" changed over time to "Telangana" and the name "Telangana" was designated to distinguish the predominantly Telugu region of the erstwhile Hyderabad State from its predominantly Marathi one, Marathwada and the predominantly Kannada region, Kalyana-Karnataka. After Asaf Jahi ceded the Seemandhra region to the British, the rest of the Telugu region retained the name Telangana and the other parts were called Madras Presidency's Circars and Ceded Districts.

According to one popular theory, the name derives from Trilinga desha ("land of three lingas") as the region is home to 3 prominent Shaivite shrines: Kaleshwaram (present-day Telangana), Srisailam and Draksharama (present-day Andhra Pradesh). According to Jayadheer Tirumala Rao, a historian, the name Telangana has Gondi origins. He asserts that it is derived from "Telangadh", which means "south" in the Gondi language, and has been referred in the "Gond script dating back to about 2,000 years".

One of the earliest recorded uses of a similar term is found in the name of Malik Maqbul Tilangani (14th century CE), who was called Tilangani, which implies that he was from Telangana. He was the commander of the Warangal Fort (Kataka Pāludu) and later Wazir (Minister) under Firuz Shah Tughlaq.

A 16th-century travel writer, Firishta, recorded in his book:

During the just reign of Ibrahim Kootb Shah, Tulingana, like Egypt, became the mart of the whole world. Merchants from Toorkistan, Arabia, and Persia resorted to it; and they met with such encouragement that they found in it inducements to return frequently. The greatest luxuries from foreign parts daily abounded at the king's hospitable board.

== History ==
Throughout antiquity and the Middle Ages, the Telangana region was part of multiple Indian empires; such as the Maurya, Satavahana, Vishnukundina, Chalukya, Chola, Rashtrakuta, Kakatiya, Delhi Sultanate, Bahmani Sultanate and Golconda Sultanate. During the 17th to 19th centuries, the region was ruled by the Mughals and Nizam of Hyderabad. In 1823, the Nizams ceded Northern Circars (in Coastal Andhra) and Ceded Districts (in Rayalaseema) to British India under a subsidiary alliance which reduced it to that of a landlocked princely state bounded on all sides by British India.

Following Indian Independence in 1947, Hyderabad state joined the Union of India in 1948 after a police action. In 1956, Hyderabad State was dissolved and its Telugu-speaking region Telangana was merged with the Andhra State to form Andhra Pradesh. A peasant-driven movement began to advocate for separation from Andhra Pradesh starting in the early 1950s, and continued until Telangana was granted statehood on 2 June 2014.

The historic city Golconda in pre-Independent Hyderabad established itself as a diamond trading centre, and until the end of the 19th century, the Golconda market was the primary source of the finest and largest diamonds in the world. Thus, the name Golconda Diamonds became synonymous with Golconda itself.

=== Early history ===
==== Aśmaka (Assaka) Mahajanapada ====
One of the earliest known political formations in the region of present-day Telangana was the ancient Aśmaka (Assaka) Mahajanapada, which flourished roughly between 700 BCE and 400 BCE. Distinguished as the only southern kingdom among the sixteen great Mahajanapadas of early Iron Age India, Aśmaka held an important place in the subcontinent's historical and cultural landscape.

Buddhist texts and the Puranas describe Aśmaka as a prosperous kingdom situated along the banks of the Godavari River, south of the Vindhya ranges. Its capital city, Podana—also referred to as Potali or Paudanyapura—is identified by most scholars with modern-day Bodhan in Telangana The prominence of Aśmaka in early historical texts highlights the deep antiquity and cultural significance of the Telangana region.

From 230 BCE to 220 CE, the Satavahana dynasty became the dominant power in this area. It originated from the lands between the Godavari and Krishna rivers and was based at Amaravathi and Dharanikota. After the decline of the Satavahanas, various dynasties, such as the Vakataka, Vishnukundina, Chalukya, Rashtrakuta and Western Chalukya, ruled the area.

=== Medieval period ===
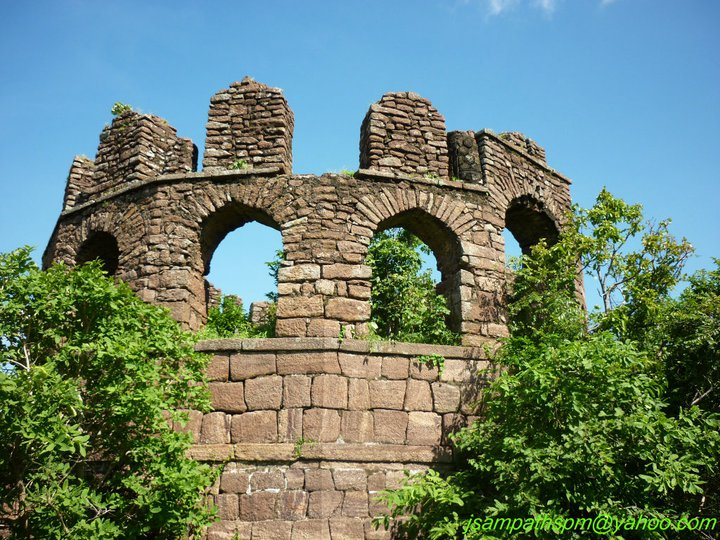
Ramagiri Fort ruins at Begampet in Peddapalli district is an ancient fort initially built by the Sathavahanas and modified many times by other dynasties until the 16th century.

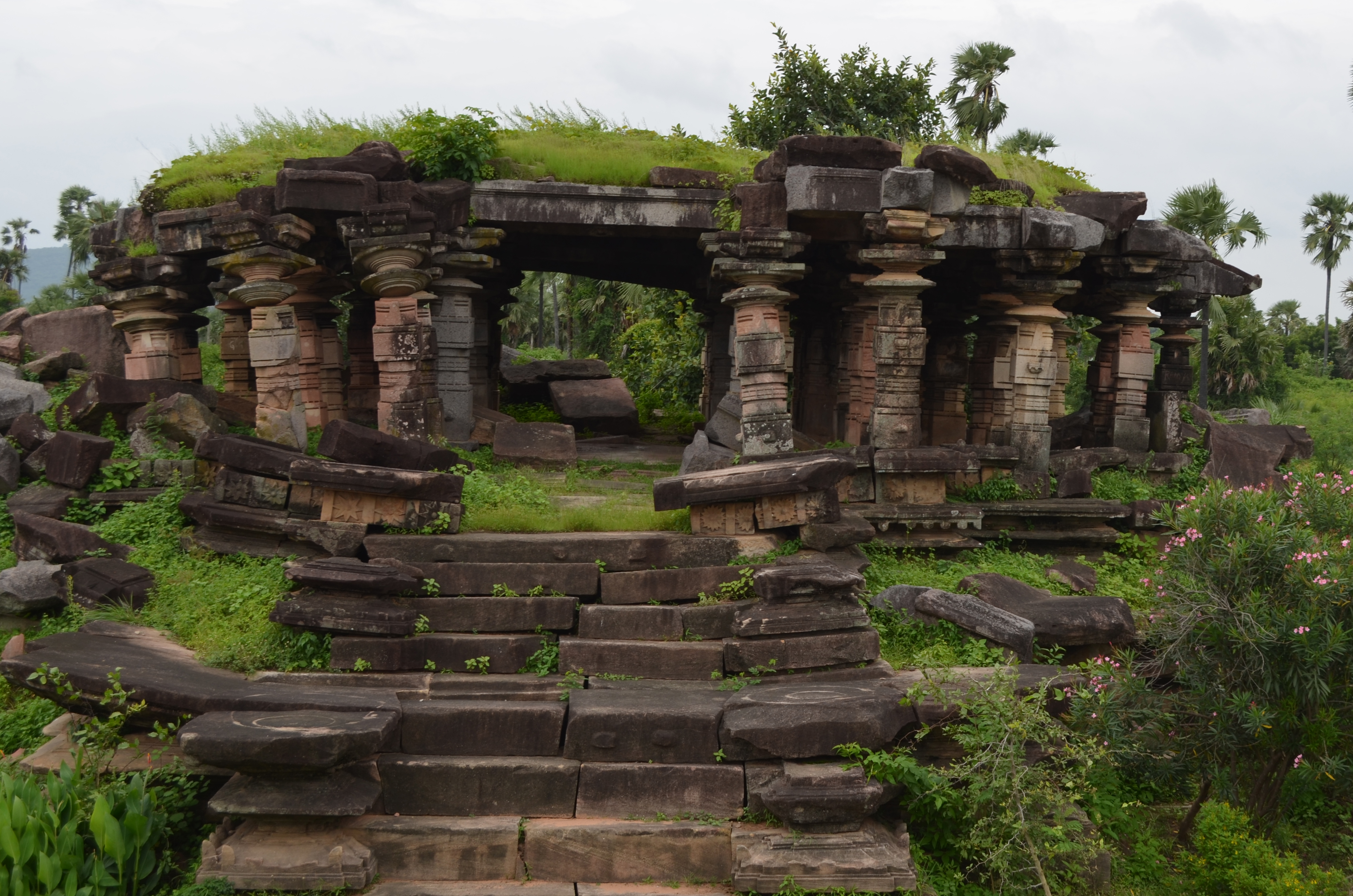
Kota Gullu, temple ruins built in the 12th century by Kakatiyas at Ghanpur, Mulug in Warangal district.

The Telangana area experienced its golden age during the reign of the Kakatiya dynasty, which ruled most parts of the present-day Andhra Pradesh and Telangana from 1083 to 1323 CE. Rudrama Devi and Prataparudra II were prominent rulers from this dynasty. The dynasty weakened with the attack of Malik Kafur in 1309 and was dissolved after the defeat of Prataparudra by the forces of Muhammad bin Tughluq in 1323.

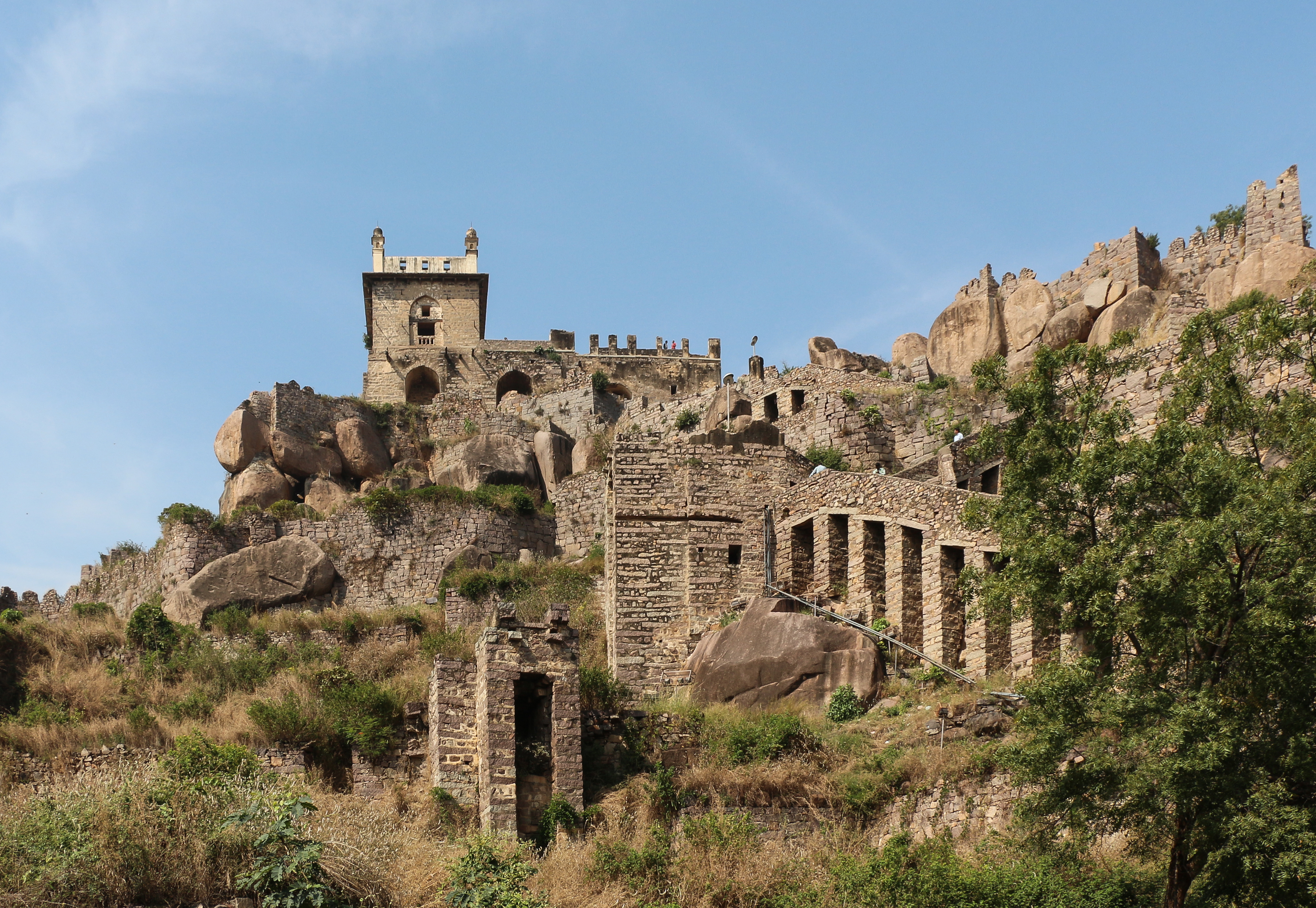
Golconda Fort

The area came under the rule of the Delhi Sultanate in the 14th century, followed by the Bahmani Sultanate. Quli Qutb Mulk, a governor of Golconda, revolted against the Bahmani Sultanate and established the Qutb Shahi dynasty in 1518. On 21 September 1687, the Golconda Sultanate came under the rule of the Mughal emperor Aurangzeb after a year-long siege of the Golconda fort.

During the early seventeenth century a strong cotton-weaving industry existed in Telangana. Large quantities of cotton were produced for domestic consumption and exporting. High quality plain and patterned cloth made of muslin and calico was produced.

In 1712, Qamar-ud-din Khan was appointed by emperor Farrukhsiyar as the viceroy of Deccan with the title Nizam-ul-Mulk (meaning "Administrator of the Realm"). He was later recalled to Delhi, with Mubariz Khan appointed as the viceroy. In 1724, Qamar-ud-din Khan defeated Mubariz Khan to reclaim the Deccan suba, establishing it as an autonomous province of the Mughal empire. He took the name Asif Jah, starting what came to be known as the Asaf Jahi dynasty. He named the area Hyderabad Deccan. Subsequent rulers retained the title Nizam ul-Mulk and were called Asif Jahi Nizams or nizams of Hyderabad. Hyderabad Nizams remained the tributary of marathas after suffering series of defeats paying annual chauth in return for retaining their domain. The Medak and Warangal divisions of Telangana were part of their realm.

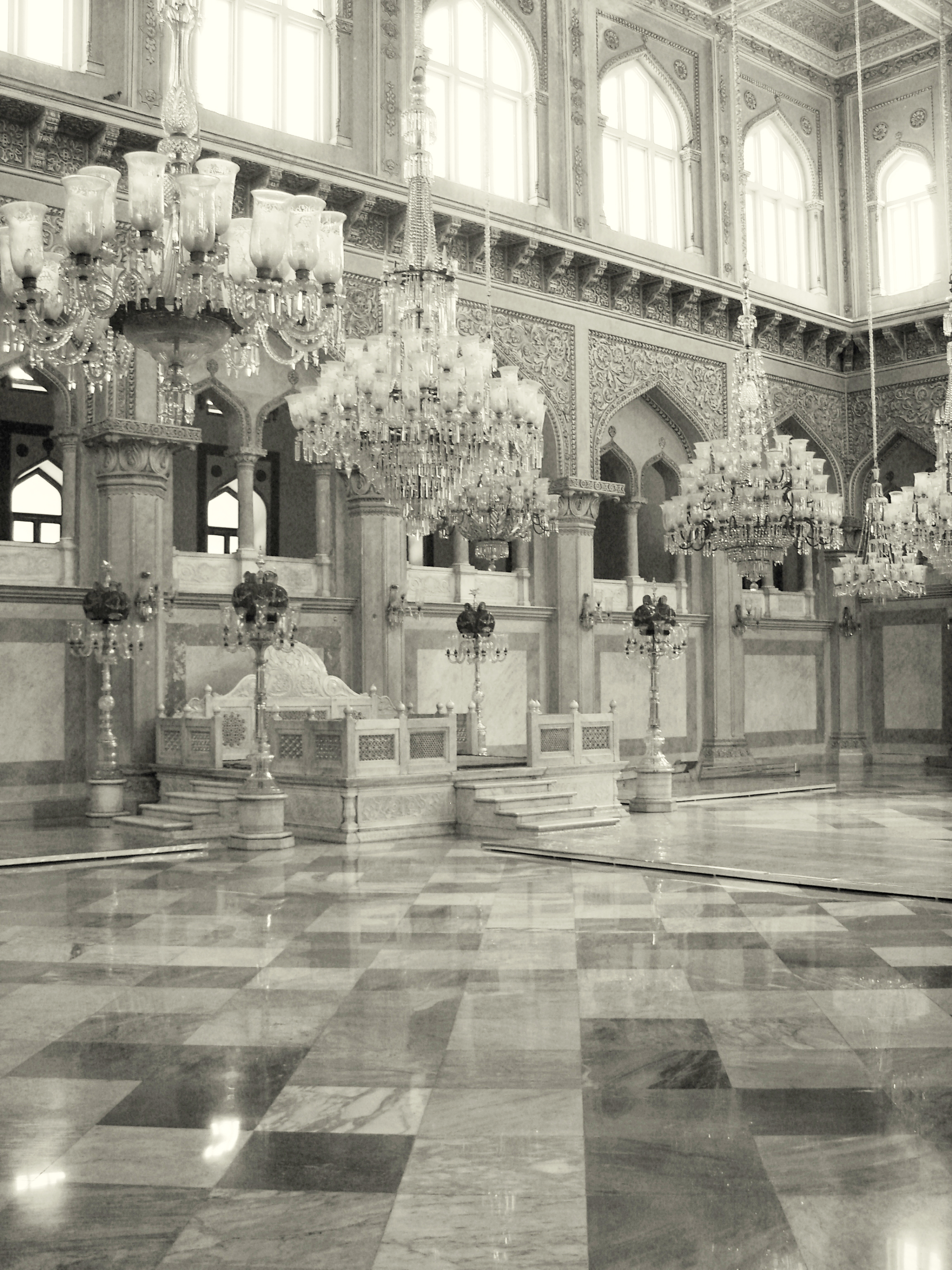
Telangana was the seat of numerous dynasties. The Chowmahalla Palace was home to the Nizams of Hyderabad.

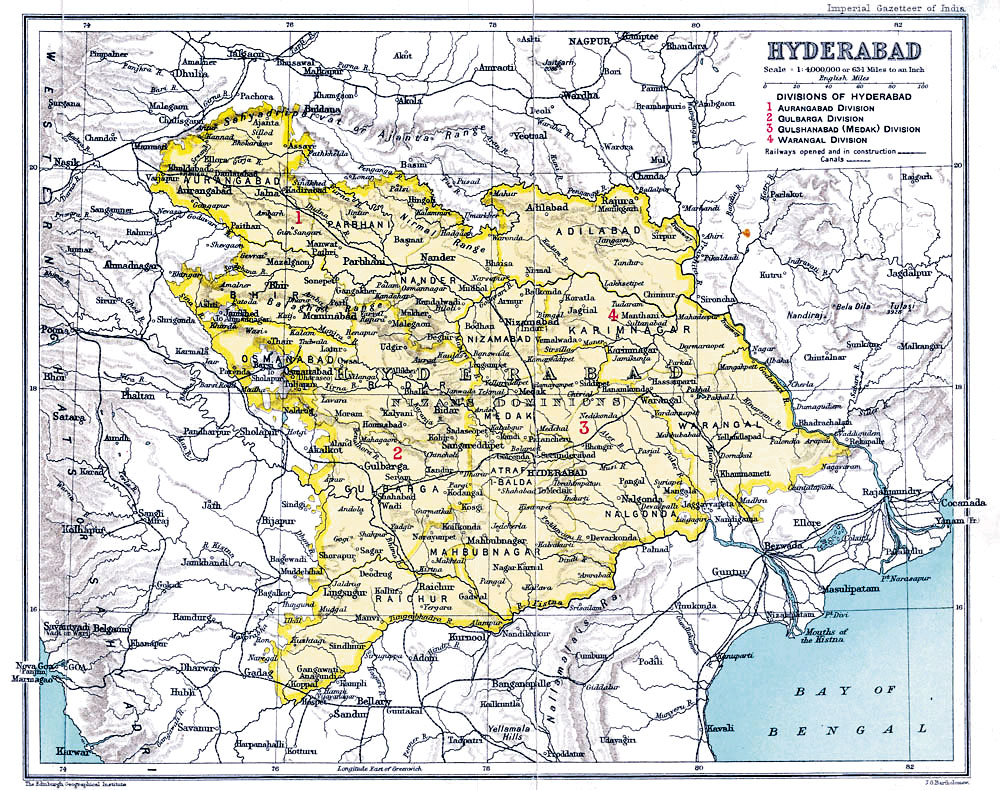
Hyderabad State in 1909

When Asif Jah I died in 1748, there was political unrest due to contention for the throne among his sons, who were aided by opportunistic neighbouring states and colonial foreign forces. In 1769, Hyderabad city became the formal capital of the Nizams. The Nizam Nasir-ud-dawlah, Asaf Jah IV signed the subsidiary alliance with the British in 1799 and lost its control over the state's defence and foreign affairs.

All of the Telugu speaking regions of present-day Telangana, Coastal Andhra and Rayalaseema were under the rule of Asaf Jahi I. However, after the second monarch, Nizam Ali Khan, Asaf Jah II (1762–1803), signed the Treaty of Subsidiary Alliance with the British in 1798, the rulers were soon under financial duress as the state had to pay the British East India Company hundreds of thousands of rupees a year to maintain the foreign troops.

The Nizam's government kept borrowing money from Palmer and Company in the first half of the 19th century, which it could not repay. Instead, the EIC paid-off the bank, and in return annexed the present-day Coastal Andhra and Rayalaseema regions from the Nizams, which were since then referred to as Circars (which means the region sold to the British lords) and Ceded, respectively.

Hyderabad State became a princely state among the presidencies and provinces of British India.

In 1787, heavy flooding killed over 20,000, causing a plague which killed about 10,656 people in Telangana.

=== Modern period ===
When India became independent from the British Empire in 1947, the Nizam of Hyderabad did not want to merge with the Indian Union and wanted to remain independent. The Government of India annexed Hyderabad State on 17 September 1948 after a military operation called Operation Polo. It appointed a civil servant, M. K. Vellodi, as first chief minister of Hyderabad State on 26 January 1950. He administered the state with the help of English-educated bureaucrats from the Madras and Bombay states, who were familiar with British systems of administration unlike the bureaucrats of Hyderabad State who used a completely different administrative system. The official language of the state was switched from Urdu to English.

In 1952, Burgula Ramakrishna Rao was elected chief minister of the Hyderabad State in its first democratic election. During this time, there were violent agitations by some Telangana natives to send the Madras state bureaucrats back and implement a rule by the natives (mulkis) of Hyderabad. Syed Alam Sharjil was elected chief minister of Hyderabad after Dr. Burgula Ramakrishana Rao resigned from the post.

The Telangana Rebellion was a peasant revolt supported by the communists. It originated in the Telangana regions of the Hyderabad State between 1946 and 1951, led by the Communist Party of India (CPI).

The revolt began in the Nalgonda district against the feudal lords of Reddy and Velama castes. It quickly spread to the Warangal and Bidar districts. Peasant farmers and labourers revolted against the local feudal landlords (jagirdars and deshmukhs) and later against the Nizam Osman Ali Khan. The violent phase of the movement ended after the government of India's Operation Polo. Starting in 1951, the CPI shifted to a more moderate strategy of seeking to bring communism to India within the framework of Indian democracy.

In December 1953, the States Reorganisation Commission (SRC) was appointed to form states on a linguistic basis. An agreement was reached between Telangana leaders and Andhra leaders on 20 February 1956 to merge Telangana and Andhra with promises to safeguard Telangana's interests. After reorganisation in 1956, the region of Telangana was merged with Andhra State to form Andhra Pradesh.

Following this Gentlemen's agreement, the central government established the unified state of Andhra Pradesh on 1 November 1956. G.O 553 of 1959 from the united Andhra Pradesh state moved two revenue divisions of Bhadrachalam from East Godavari and Aswaraopeta from West Godavari to Khammam for administrative convenience.

There had been several movements to revoke the merger of Telangana and Andhra, major ones occurring in 1969, 1972, and 2009. The movement for a new state of Telangana gained momentum in the 21st century by an initiative of Kalvakuntla Chandrashekhar Rao from Bharat Rashtra Samithi later joined by the Telangana Political Joint Action Committee (TJAC), including political leadership representing the Telangana area. On 9 December 2009 the government of India announced the process of formation of the Telangana state. Violent protests led by people in the Coastal Andhra and Rayalseema regions occurred immediately after the announcement, and the decision was put on hold on 23 December 2009.

The movement continued in Hyderabad and other districts of Telangana. There were hundreds of claimed suicides, strikes, protests and disturbances to public life demanding separate statehood.

On 30 July 2013, the Congress Working Committee unanimously passed a resolution to recommend the formation of a separate Telangana state. After various stages the bill was placed in the Parliament of India in February 2014. In February 2014, Andhra Pradesh Reorganisation Act, 2014 bill was passed by the Parliament of India for the formation of Telangana state, comprising ten districts from north-western Andhra Pradesh. The bill received the assent of the president and was published in the Gazette on 1 March 2014.

The state of Telangana was officially formed on 2 June 2014. Kalvakuntla Chandrashekar Rao was elected as the first chief minister of Telangana, following elections in which the Bharat Rashtra Samithi party secured a majority. Hyderabad would remain as the joint capital of both Telangana and Andhra Pradesh for a period. Within the decade, Hyderabad would become the capital of the state of Telangana, and a new capital was selected for Andhra Pradesh. Andhra Pradesh picked Amaravati as its capital and relocated its secretariat in 2016 and its legislature in 2017.

== Geography ==
Telangana and its neighbours

Telangana is situated on the Deccan Plateau, in the central stretch of the eastern seaboard of the Indian Peninsula. It covers 112,077 square kilometres (43,273 sq mi). The region is drained by two major rivers, with about 79% of the Godavari River catchment area and about 69% of the Krishna River catchment area, but most of the land is arid. Telangana is also drained by several minor rivers such as the Bhima, the Maner, the Manjira, the Musi, and the Tungabhadra.

The annual rainfall is between 900 and 1500 mm in northern Telangana and 700 to 900 mm in southern Telangana, from the southwest monsoons. Telangana contains various soil types, some of which are red sandy loams (Chalaka), Red loamy sands (Dubba), lateritic soils, salt-affected soils, alluvial soils, shallow to medium black soils and very deep black cotton soils. These soil types allow the planting of a variety of fruits and vegetable crops such as mangoes, oranges, coconut, sugarcane, paddy, banana and flower crops.

=== Climate ===
Telangana is a semi-arid area and has a predominantly hot and dry climate. Summers start in March, and peak in the middle of April with average high temperatures in the 37–38 °C (99–100 °F) range. The monsoon arrives in June and lasts until Late-September with about 755 mm (29.7 inches) of precipitation. A dry, mild winter starts in late November and lasts until early February with little humidity and average temperatures in the 22–23 °C (72–73 °F) range.

==== Ecology ====
The Central Deccan Plateau dry deciduous forests ecoregion covers much of the state, including Hyderabad. The characteristic vegetation is woodlands of Hardwickia binata and Albizia amara. Over 80% of the original forest cover has been cleared for agriculture, timber harvesting, or cattle grazing, but large blocks of forest can be found in Nagarjunsagar-Srisailam Tiger Reserve and elsewhere. The more humid Eastern Highlands moist deciduous forests cover the Eastern Ghats in the eastern part of the state.

==== National parks and sanctuaries ====
Telangana has three National Parks: Kasu Brahmananda Reddy National Park in Hyderabad district, and Mahavir Harina Vanasthali National Park and Mrugavani National Park in Ranga Reddy district.

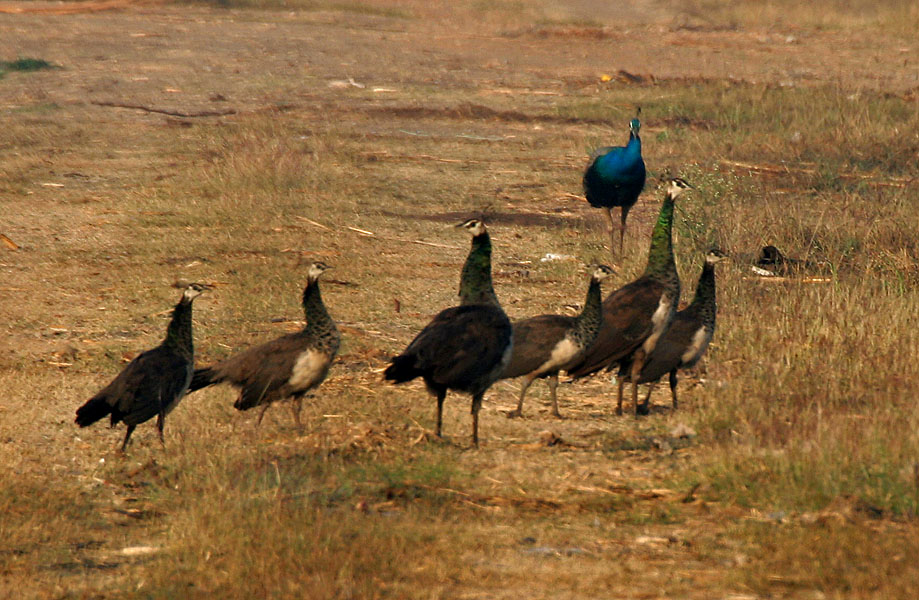
Indian peafowl (Pavo cristatus) near Hyderabad

Wildlife sanctuaries in Telangana include Eturunagaram Wildlife Sanctuary and Pakhal Wildlife Sanctuary in Warangal District, Kawal Tiger Reserve and Pranahita Wildlife Sanctuary in Adilabad district, Kinnerasani Wildlife Sanctuary in Khammam district, Manjira Wildlife Sanctuary in Medak district, Nagarjunsagar-Srisailam Tiger Reserve in Nalgonda and Mahbubnagar districts, Pocharam Wildlife Sanctuary in Medak and Nizamabad districts, Shivaram Wildlife Sanctuary in Karimnagar district.

Sacred groves are small areas of forest preserved by local people. Sacred groves provide sanctuary to the local flora and fauna. Some are included within other protected areas, like Kadalivanam in Nagarjunsagar–Srisailam Tiger Reserve, but most stand alone. There are 65 sacred groves in Telangana—two in Adilabad district, thirteen in Hyderabad district, four in Karimnagar district, four in Khammam district, nine in Mahbubnagar district, four in Medak district, nine in Nalgonda district, ten in Ranga Reddy district, and three in Warangal district.

== Demographics ==
=== Language ===
Languages spoken by district Telugu 30–40% 40–50% 60–70% 70–80% 80–90% 90–100%

Languages of Telangana (2011)
1. Telugu (75.5%)
2. Urdu (12.3%)
3. Lambadi (5.55%)
4. Marathi (1.77%)
5. Hindi (1.52%)
6. Others (3.33%)

Telugu, one of the classical languages of India, is the official language of Telangana and Urdu is the second official language of the state. About 75% of the population of Telangana speak Telugu and 12% speak Urdu. Before 1948, Urdu was the official language of Hyderabad State, and due to a lack of Telugu-language educational institutions, Urdu was the language of the educated elite of Telangana. After 1948, once Hyderabad State joined the new Republic of India, Telugu became the language of government, and as Telugu was introduced as the medium of instruction in schools and colleges, the use of Urdu among non-Hyderabadi Muslims decreased. Both Telugu and Urdu are used in services across the state, such as the Telangana Legislature website, with Telugu and Urdu versions of the website available, as well as the Hyderabad metro, wherein both languages are used on station names and signs along with English and Hindi. The Urdu spoken in Telangana is called Hyderabadi Urdu, which in itself is a dialect of the larger Dakhini Urdu dialects of South India. Although the language is spoken by most Hyderabadi Muslims, the language in a literary context has long been lost, and standard Urdu is used. Hindi is spoken mainly in Hyderabad, as well as some other urban areas like Warangal. Lambadi, a language related to Rajasthani dialects, is used across the state. Marathi is predominant in regions bordering Maharashtra, especially in the old Adilabad district, while Kannada is spoken by significant minorities along some parts of the Karnataka border. The old Adilabad district has a large number of speakers of tribal languages such as Gondi and Kolami, while Koya is a language spoken by significant numbers in Bhadradi Kothagudem district and along the Chhattisgarh border.

Telangana ranked eighth in the Fiscal Health Index (FHI) 2025, with a score of 43.6.

=== Religion and culture ===
Religion in Telangana (2011)
1. Hinduism (85.1%)
2. Islam (12.7%)
3. Christianity (1.27%)
4. Buddhism (0.09%)
5. Sikhism (0.09%)
6. Jainism (0.08%)
7. Other (0.01%)
8. Not stated (0.68%)

Religious composition of Telangana
Religion	2011 Population	%
Hinduism	29,046,913	85.09
Islam	4,333,928	12.69
Christianity	434,403	1.27
Buddhism	30,340	0.09
Sikhism	31,758	0.09
Jainism	26,690	0.08
Other religions and persuasions	4,968	0.01
Religion not stated	233,227	0.68
Total	34,142,969	100

According to the 2011 census, Hindus form 85.1% of the state's population. Muslims form 12.7% and Christians form 1.3%.

Religious edifices like the Lakshmi Narasimha Temple in Yadadri Bhuvanagiri district, Makkah Masjid in Hyderabad, the ancient Bhadrakali Temple and Govinda Rajula Gutta in Warangal, Alampur Jogulamba Temple in Jogulamba Gadwal district and Medak Cathedral in Medak District, Kondagattu Anjaneya Swamy Temple in Jagtial District, Kothakonda Veerabhadra Swamy Temple, Lord Shiva temple in Vemulawada of Rajanna Sircilla district are several of its most famous places of worship. Buddhism also flourished in the region and many Aramams can be found.

Hyderabadi cuisine and Kakatiya architecture both from Telangana, are on the list of creativity UNESCO creative city of gastronomy and UNESCO World Heritage Site.

The cultural centers of Telangana, Hyderabad and Warangal, are noted for their wealth and renowned historical structures – Ramappa Temple (UNESCO World Heritage Site), Charminar, Qutb Shahi Tombs, Falaknuma Palace, Chowmahalla Palace, Warangal Fort, Kakatiya Kala Thoranam, Thousand Pillar Temple and the Bhongir Fort.

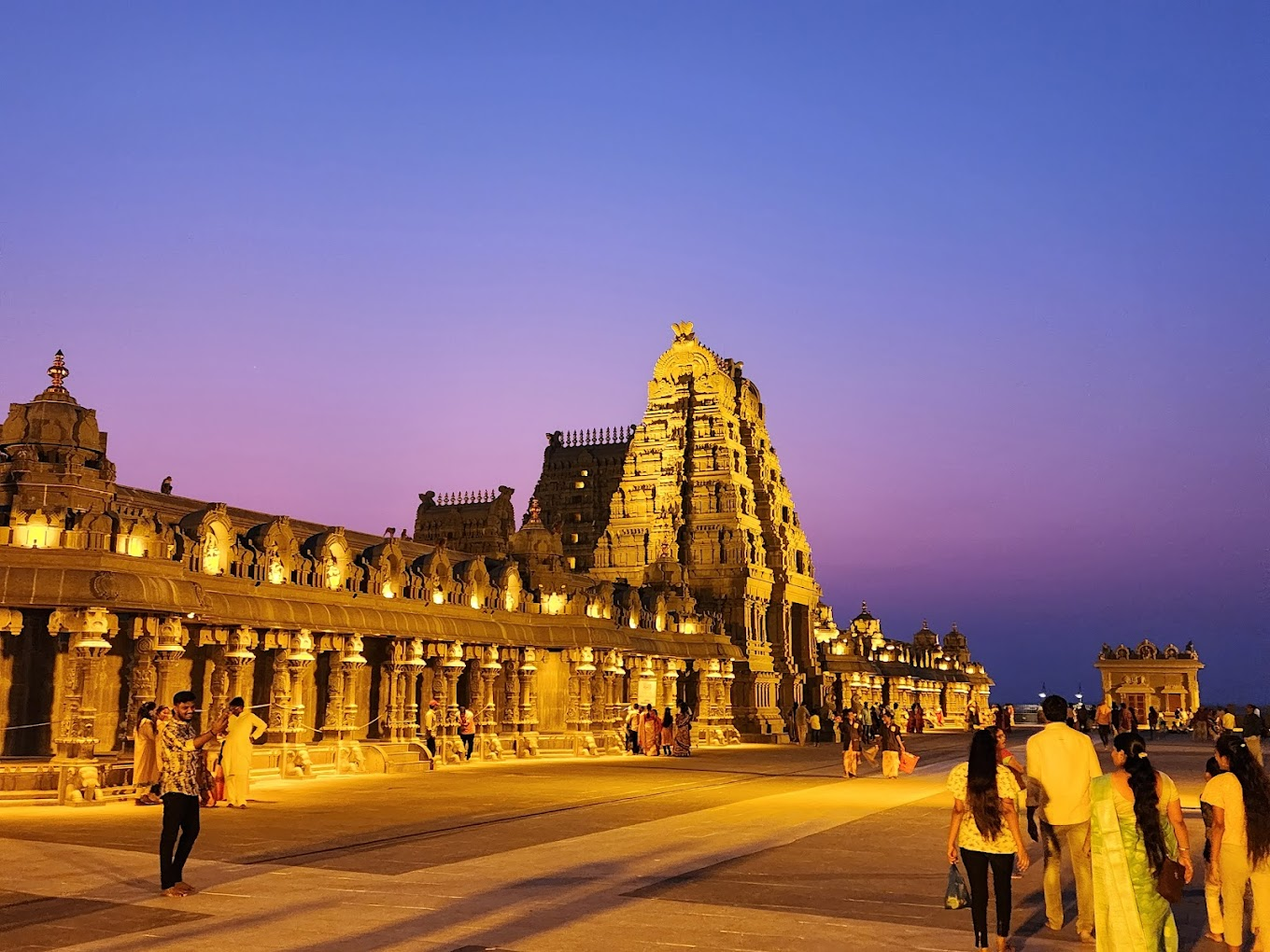
Sri Lakshmi Narasimha Swamy Temple in Yadadri

=== Literacy ===
According to the 2011 census, Telangana's literacy rate is 66.46%. Male literacy and female literacy are 74.95% and 57.92%, respectively. Hyderabad district has the highest literacy rate with 80.96% and Mahabubnagar district has the lowest with 56.06%.

In a 2019 report, the Key Indicators of Household Social Consumption on Education in India, by the Ministry of Statistics and Programme Implementation, Telangana has a literacy rate of 72.8% which is the fourth lowest among large states. It also has the second lowest literacy rate among rural women at 53.7%. 37.1% of the population aged 3–35 years received free education at pre-primary and higher levels in Telangana.

== Administrative divisions ==
Telangana at the time of formation on 2 June 2014

The state is divided into 33 districts. The latest two new districts, Mulugu and Narayanpet, were formed on 17 February 2019. The districts are divided into 70 revenue divisions which are further divided into 584 mandals. There are a total of 10,909 revenue villages in the state. Each district is administered by a District Collector, each revenue division is headed by a Revenue Divisional Officer, and each mandal is managed by a Mandal Revenue Officer. Each village in every mandal is administered by a Village Revenue Officer (VRO) under the supervision of the Tahsildar (MRO).

The districts in the state are:

District	Headquarters	District before 2019
Adilabad	Adilabad	-
Bhadradri Kothagudem	Kothagudem	Khammam
Hanumakonda	Hanumakonda	Warangal, Karimnagar
Hyderabad	Hyderabad	-
Jagitial	Jagitial	Karimnagar
Jangaon	Jangaon	Warangal, Nalgonda
Jayashankar Bhupalpally	Bhupalpally	Warangal, Karimnagar
Jogulamba Gadwal	Gadwal	Mahabubnagar
Kamareddy	Kamareddy	Nizamabad
Karimnagar	Karimnagar	-
Khammam	Khammam	-
Kumuram Bheem	Asifabad	Adilabad
Mahabubabad	Mahabubabad	Warangal, Khammam
Mahbubnagar	Mahbubnagar	-
Mancherial	Mancherial	Adilabad
Medak	Medak	-
Medchal–Malkajgiri	Shamirpet	Ranga Reddy
Mulugu	Mulugu	Warangal
Nagarkurnool	Nagarkurnool	Mahabubnagar
Nalgonda	Nalgonda	-
Narayanpet	Narayanpet	Mahabubnagar
Nirmal	Nirmal	Adilabad
Nizamabad	Nizamabad	-
Peddapalli	Peddapalli	Karimnagar
Rajanna Sircilla	Sircilla	Karimnagar
Ranga Reddy	Shamshabad	Ranga Reddy
Sangareddy	Sangareddy	Medak
Siddipet	Siddipet	Medak, Karimnagar, Warangal
Suryapet	Suryapet	Nalgonda
Vikarabad	Vikarabad	Ranga Reddy
Wanaparthy	Wanaparthy	Mahabubnagar
Warangal	Warangal	-
Yadadri Bhuvanagiri	Bhongir	Nalgonda

=== Local governments ===
There are a total of 15 cities in the state. Hyderabad is the biggest city in the state and the 4th largest city in India. There are 9 municipal corporations and 107 municipalities in the state for urban governance. Each local body has its own elected councils and members and executive staffs for governance and administration.

There are 12,777 gram panchayats, 566 mandal praja parishads, and 31 zila praja parishads in the state for rural governance.

== Government and politics ==
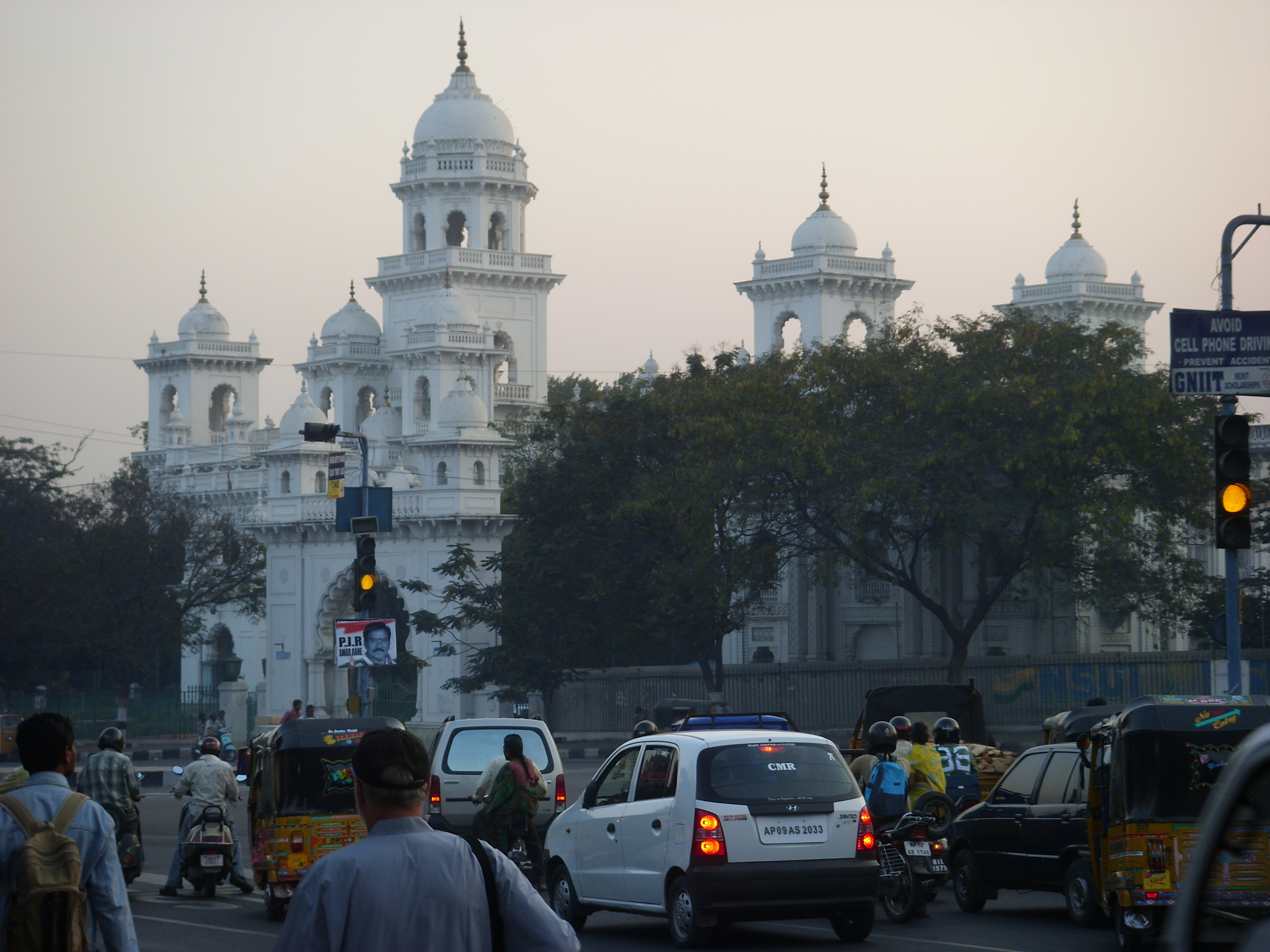
Telangana Legislative Assembly building

Telangana is governed by a parliamentary system of representative democracy, a feature the state shares with other Indian states. Universal suffrage is granted to residents. There are three branches of government.

1. Executive authority is vested in the Council of Ministers headed by the Chief Minister, although the titular head of government is the Governor. The governor is the head of state appointed by the President of India. The leader of the party or coalition with a majority in the Legislative Assembly is appointed as the chief minister by the governor, and the Council of Ministers are appointed by the governor on the advice of the chief minister. The Council of Ministers reports to the Legislative Assembly.
2. The legislature, the Telangana Legislative Assembly and the Telangana Legislative Council, consists of elected members and special office bearers such as the Speaker and Deputy Speaker, that are elected by the members. Assembly meetings are presided over by the speaker or the deputy speaker in the speaker's absence. The Assembly is bicameral with 119 Members of the Legislative Assembly and 40 Member of the Legislative Council. Terms of office run for five years unless the Assembly is dissolved prior to the completion of the term. The Legislative Council is a permanent body with one-third of members retiring every two years.
3. The judiciary is composed of the Telangana High Court and a system of lower courts.

Auxiliary authorities known as panchayats, for which local body elections are regularly held, govern local affairs. The state contributes seats to Lok Sabha.

The main political parties in the regional politics are the Bharat Rashtra Samithi, All India Majlis-e-Ittehadul Muslimeen, Bharatiya Janata Party and Indian National Congress. Following the Telangana Legislative Assembly Election in 2023, the Indian National Congress under Anumula Revanth Reddy was elected to power.

== Economy ==
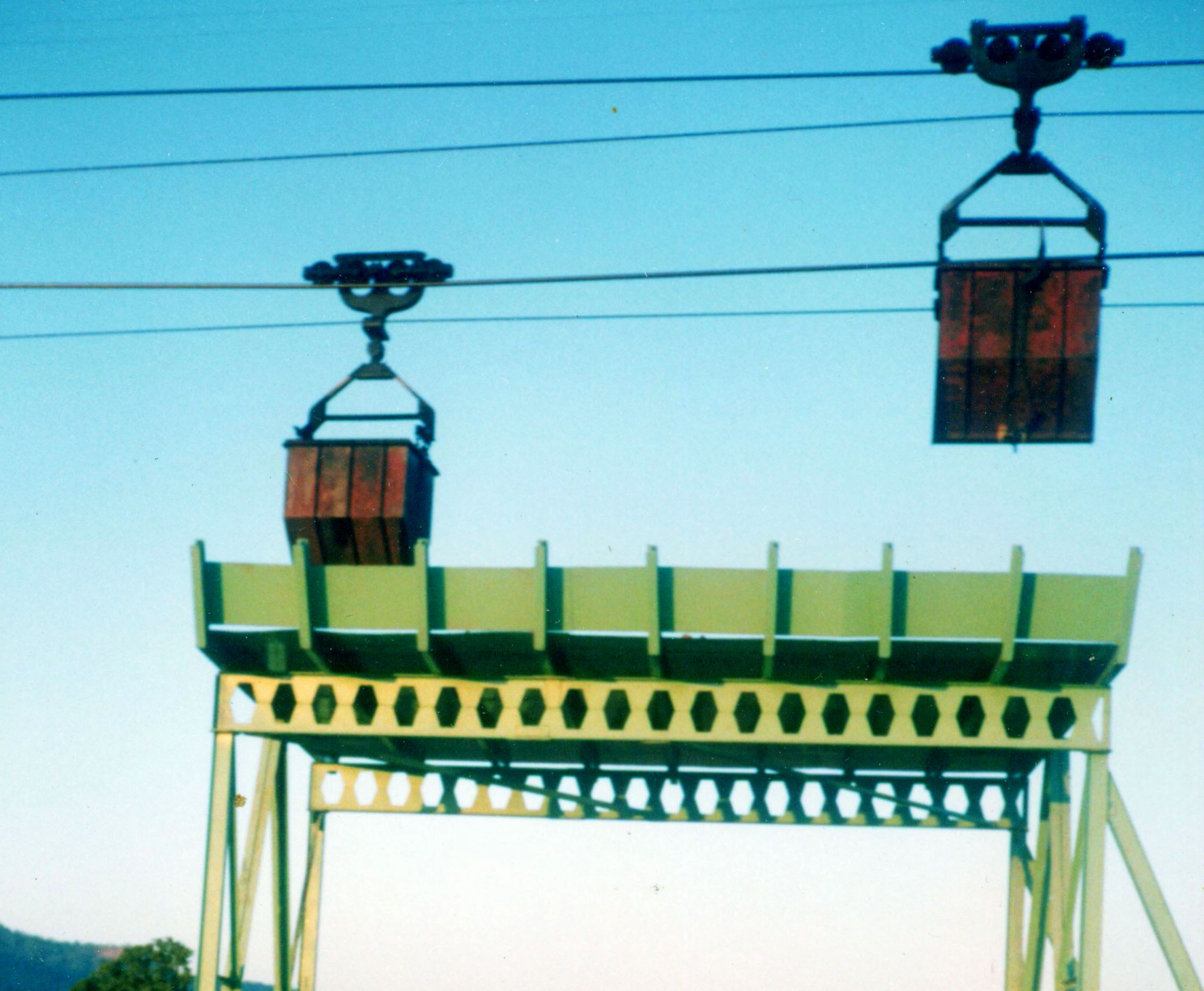
Coal handling ropeway near Manuguru, Bhadradri Kothagudem district

The economy of Telangana is mainly driven by agriculture. Two important rivers of India, the Godavari and Krishna, flow through the state, providing irrigation. Farmers in Telangana mainly depend on rain-fed water sources for irrigation. Rice is the major food crop. Other important crops are cotton, sugar cane, mango, and tobacco. Recently, crops used for vegetable oil production such as sunflower and peanuts have gained favour. There are many multi-state irrigation projects in development, including Godavari River Basin Irrigation Projects and Nagarjuna Sagar Dam, the world's highest masonry dam.

Telangana is a mineral-rich state, with coal reserves at Singareni Collieries Company.

The state has also started to focus on the fields of information technology and biotechnology. Telangana is one of top IT-exporting states of India. There are 68 Special Economic Zones in the state.

=== Agriculture ===
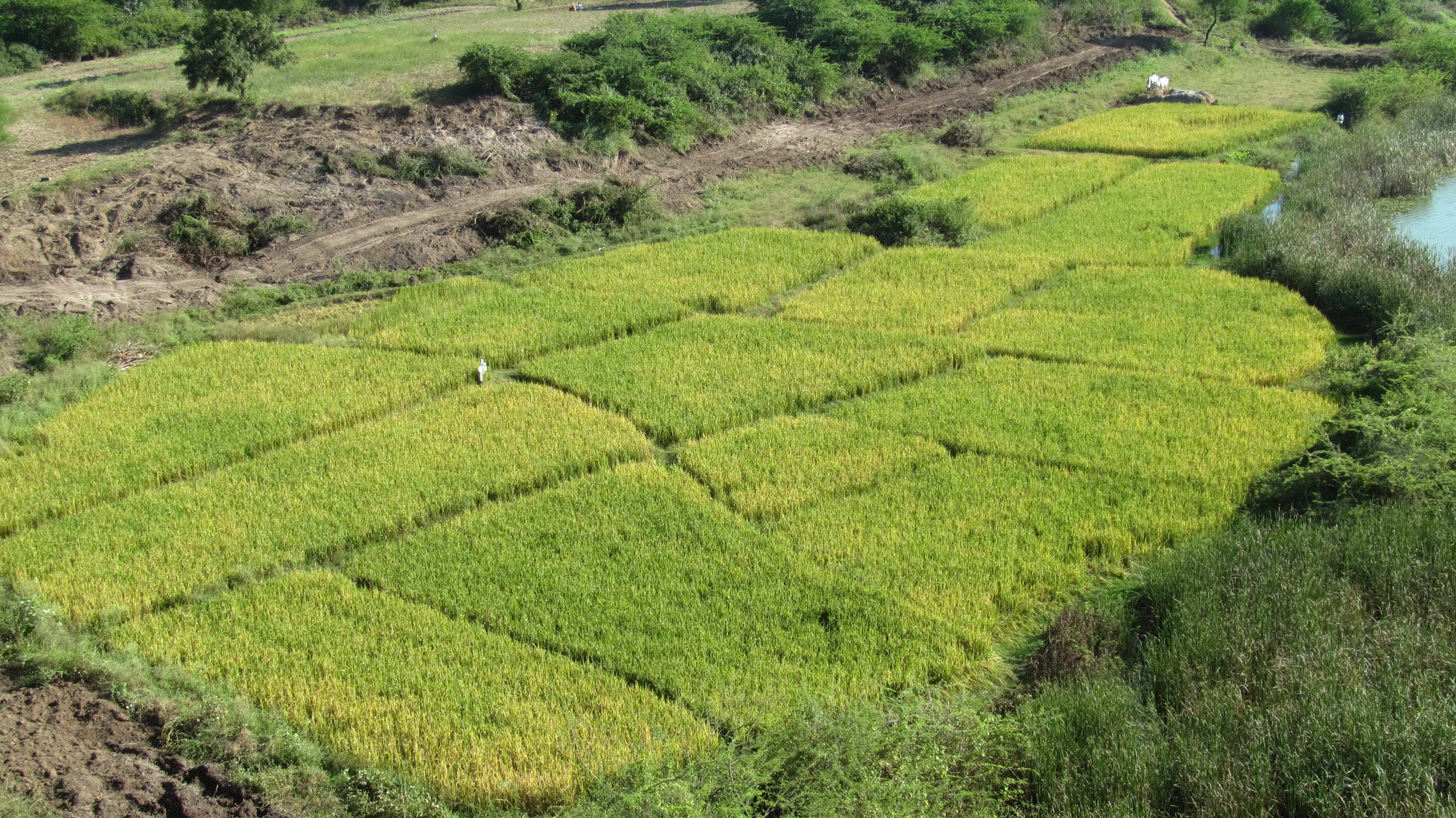
Paddy fields in Warangal district

Rice is the major food crop and staple food of the state. Other important crops are maize, tobacco, mango, cotton and sugar cane. Agriculture has been the chief source of income for the state's economy. The Godavari and Krishna rivers flow through the state, providing irrigation. Apart from major rivers, there are small rivers like Tunga Bhadra, Bima, Dindi, Kinnerasani, Manjeera, Manair, Penganga, Pranahitha, peddavagu and Taliperu. There are many multi-state irrigation projects in development, including Godavari River Basin Irrigation Projects and Nagarjuna Sagar Dam, the world's highest masonry dam.

Agri Export Zones for the following produce have been proposed for the following locations:

- Gherkins: Mahabubnagar, Rangareddy, Medak, Karimnagar, Warangal
- Mangoes and grapes: Hyderabad, Rangareddy, Medak, Mahabubnagar

In 2019, environmental anthropologist Andrew Flachs raised concerns regarding the financial and social pressures experienced by small cotton farmers in Telangana after conducting ethnographic research in the area. The GM (genetically modified) seeds he focused on were introduced to combat pests and low yields. Within 10 years, GM cottonseeds, which are solely bred by private breeders, were able to capture more than 90% of the Indian market, which was formerly a public market. The privatisation of seed brands in formerly public markets has been accompanied by pesticides, fertilisers, consultations, and herbicides which are needed to manage the new monocultures. He found that this introduction, however, negatively impacted farmers' ecological knowledge about seed choices and cotton-plant management.

Flachs surveyed farming households about their experiences with GM hybrid cottonseeds from 2012 to 2016. His research initially focused on the agricultural decision-making process among Telangana cotton farmers in the wake of genetically modified seed market expansion, then later on the concept of manci digubadi as a script. Manci digubadi means "good yields", with a more extended phrasing being "manci digubadi annakunthunnanu", which translates to "I'm hoping for good yields." The concept of manci digubadi, as described by Flachs, posits that seed choice should be made based on whether or not it has "good yields", which is dependent solely on what the individual believes is "good". Flachs further argues that this script is used in the absence of reliable experiential knowledge in the face of agricultural development and GMOs. This is because, in the pursuit of a good yield, cotton farmers learn little about the seeds they use before they switch to the next promising new brands, some of which have been smuggled in or bought on the black market. Marketing, the constant influx of new options, and the fear of missing out on popular seeds also contribute to the high turnover. This high turnover and the resulting lack of experiential knowledge have resulted in cotton farmers unwittingly planting the same type of seed multiple times because they are under different brand names. In contrast to this, farmers adopt and abandon seeds from public-sector-bred crops like rice and heirloom vegetables more slowly so they can rely more on experiential knowledge to make decisions.

Telangana cotton farmers are at risk for debt and suicide caused by agricultural pressures such as unreliable credit, pest problems, and agricultural management uncertainty. Flachs argues that seed choices and the rationalisation behind the choice are central to the agricultural political economy, as seed choice is "the first decision that cotton farmers make and one that they cannot take back". Flachs argues that cotton seed choices are driven less by economic rationalism and more by an aspiration to overcome generational poverty and historical marginalisation. Flachs found evidence in his work suggesting that many farmers' seed choices are influenced by the choices of their neighbours or more wealthy landowners. As an example of manci digubadi being used in place of experiential knowledge, Flachs gives the story of a farmer who had planted the Mahyco company's Neeraja cottonseed for nine years abandoned that seed in favour of Kaveri's Jaadoo seed after hearing reports that the Jaadoo seeds had done well in a neighbouring village. Farmers also seek advice from non-household experts such as pesticide shop managers and university extension agents. There is no objective cost-benefit analysis because the costs and benefits are ambiguous due to things variations of factors like weather and pests and farmers having no reliable measure for what constitutes a good yield for cotton.

=== Industries ===
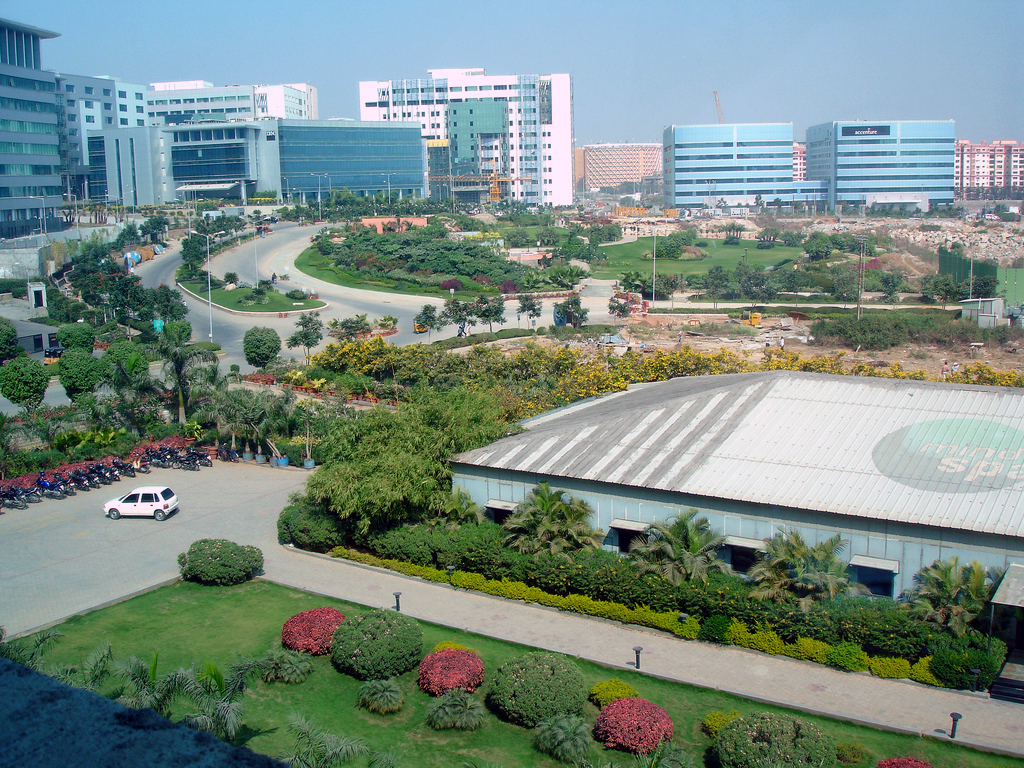
HITEC City is a major IT hub of Hyderabad.

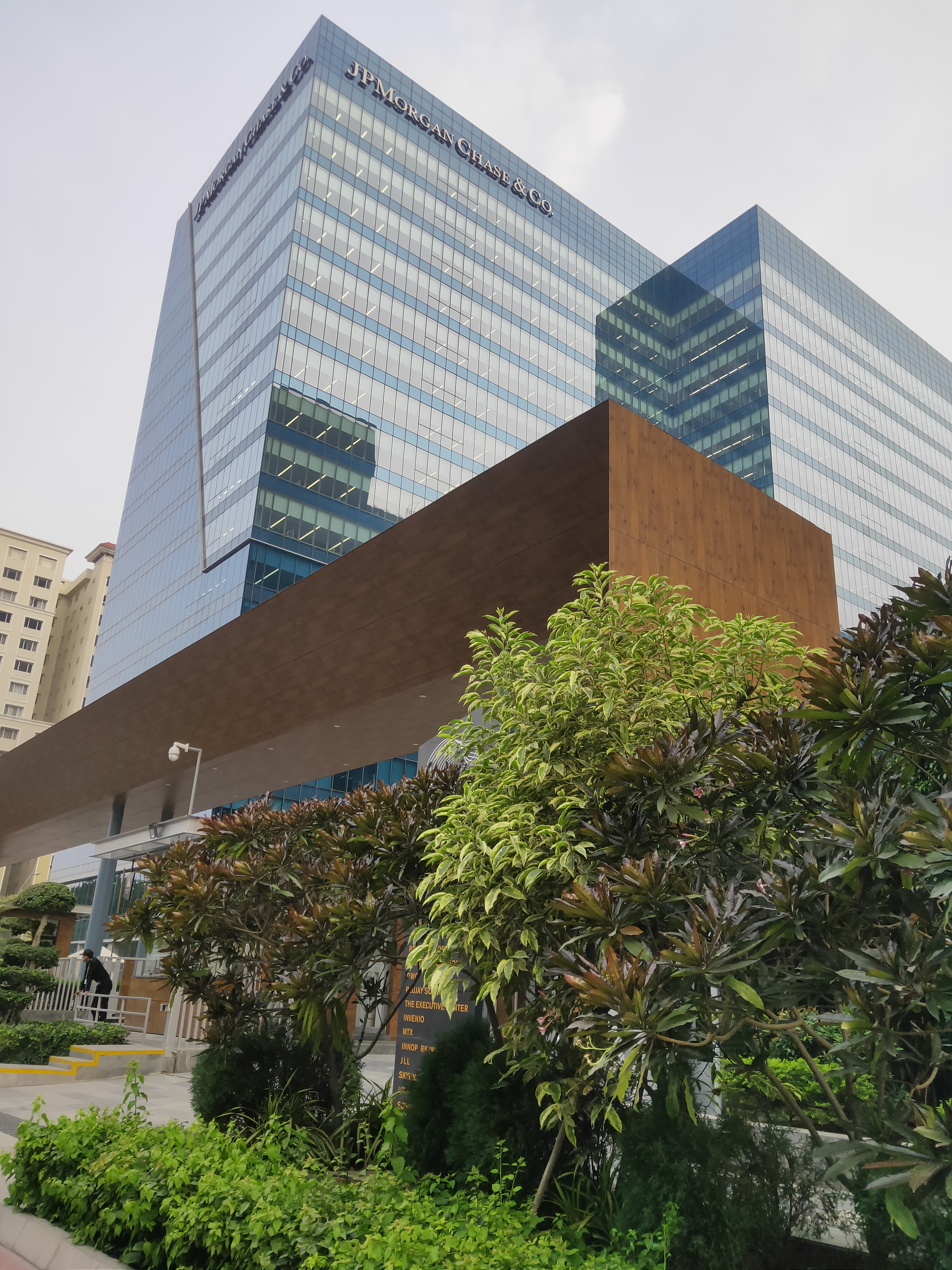
JP Morgan Chase & Co. Tower, Hyderabad, Telangana

Several major manufacturing and services industries are in operation mainly around Hyderabad. Automobiles and auto components, spices, mines and minerals, textiles and apparels, pharmaceutical, horticulture, and poultry farming are the main industries in Telangana.

In terms of services, Hyderabad is nicknamed "Cyberabad" due to the location of major software industries in the city. Prior to secession, it contributed 10% to India's and 98% to Andhra Pradesh's exports in the IT and ITES sectors in 2013 With Hyderabad in the front line of Telangana's goal to promote information technology in India, the city boasts HITEC City as its premier hub. IT companies/hubs have also been set up in Warangal, Karimnagar, and Khammam.

The state government is in the process of developing industrial parks at different places, for specific groups of industries. The existing parks are Software Park at Hyderabad, HITEC City for software units, Apparel Park at Gundlapochampalli, Export Promotion Park at Pashamylaram, Biotechnology park at Turkapally.

Hyderabad is also a major site for healthcare-related industries including hospitals and pharmaceutical organisations such as Nizam's Institute of Medical Sciences, Yashoda Hospitals, LV Prasad Eye Care, Akruti Institute of cosmetic and plastic surgery, Fever Hospital, Durgabai Deshmukh, Continental Hospitals and Apollo Hospitals. Many pharmaceutical and pharmaceutical-related companies like Dr. Reddy's Laboratories, Shantha Biotechnics and Aragen (Formerly GVK BIO) are based out of Hyderabad.

In addition, Hyderabad-based healthcare non-profits include the Indian Heart Association, a cardiovascular disease NGO.

=== Tourism ===
Telangana Tourism Development Corporation (TGTDC) is a state government agency which promotes tourism in Telangana. Telangana has a variety of tourist attractions including historical places, monuments, forts, waterfalls, forests and temples.

==== Waterfalls ====
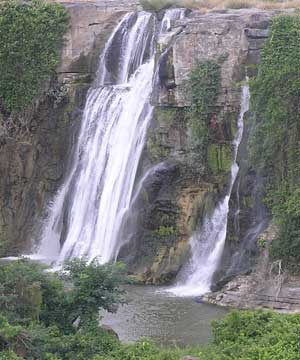
Kuntala Waterfall in Adilabad district

- Kuntala Waterfall (45 metres (148 ft)) is located in Kuntala, Adilabad district.
- Bogatha Waterfall is located in Wazeedu Mandal, Jayashankar Bhupalpally district, Telangana.
- Savatula Gundam Waterfalls in Adilabad district

=== Media ===
The print media mainly consists of Telugu and English newspapers. Nava Telangana, Sakshi, Andhra Jyothi, Eenadu and Namaste Telangana are all Telugu newspapers. English newspapers are Deccan Chronicle, The Times of India, The Hindu, Telangana Today and The Hans India. Notable Urdu newspapers include Etemaad Daily, The Munsif Daily, and The Siasat Daily.

== Infrastructure ==
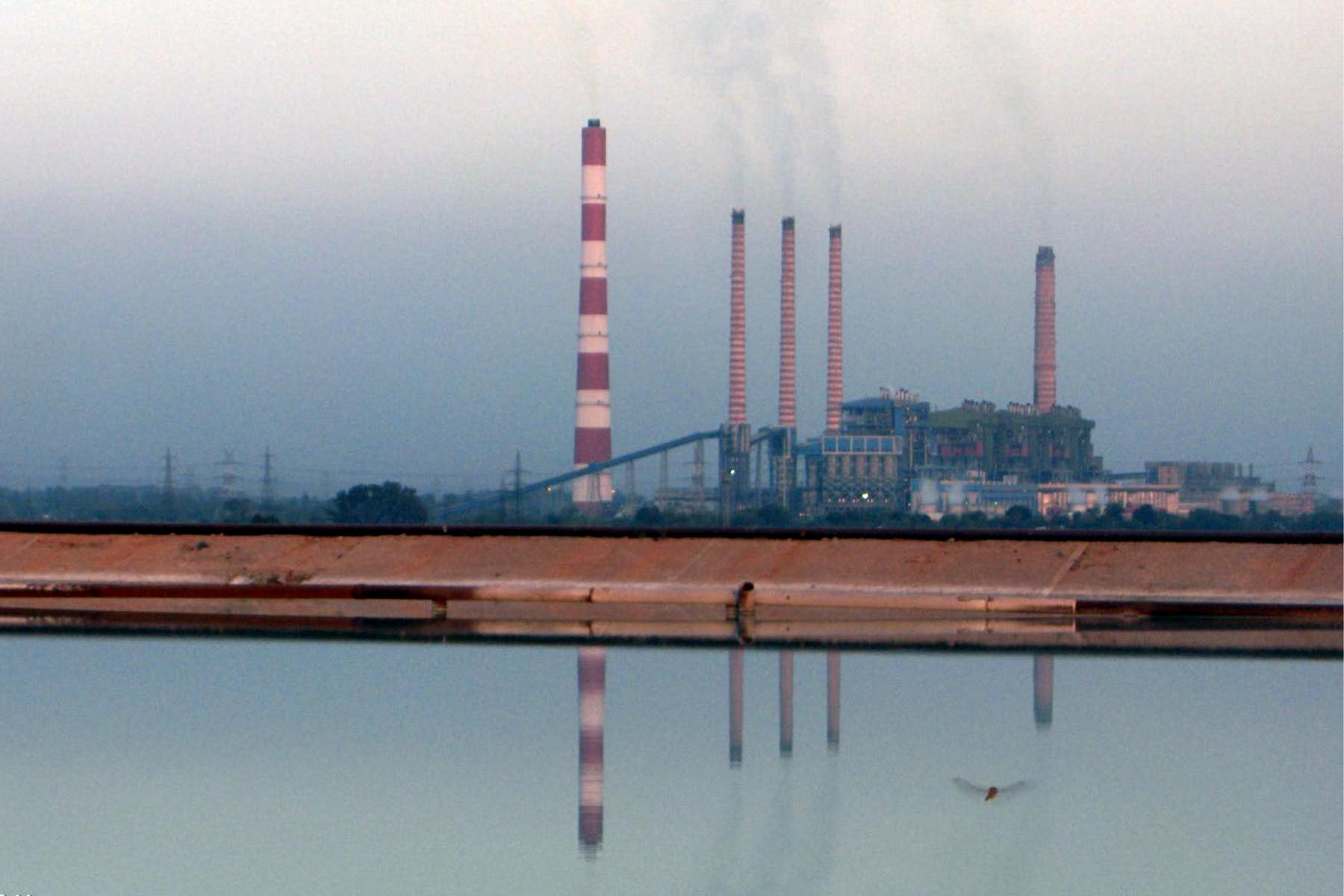
Ramagundam Thermal Power station

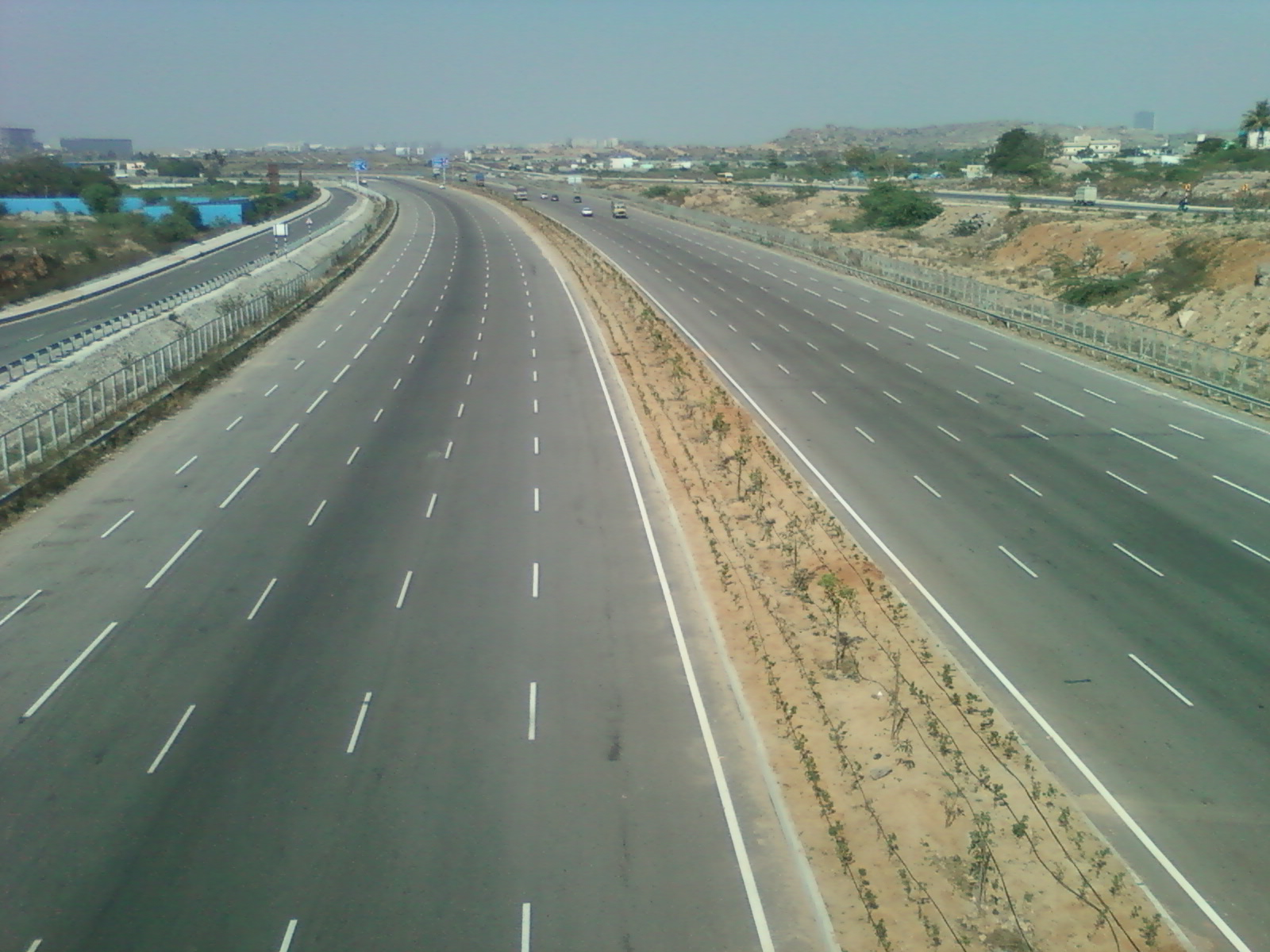
Hyderabad Outer Ring Road

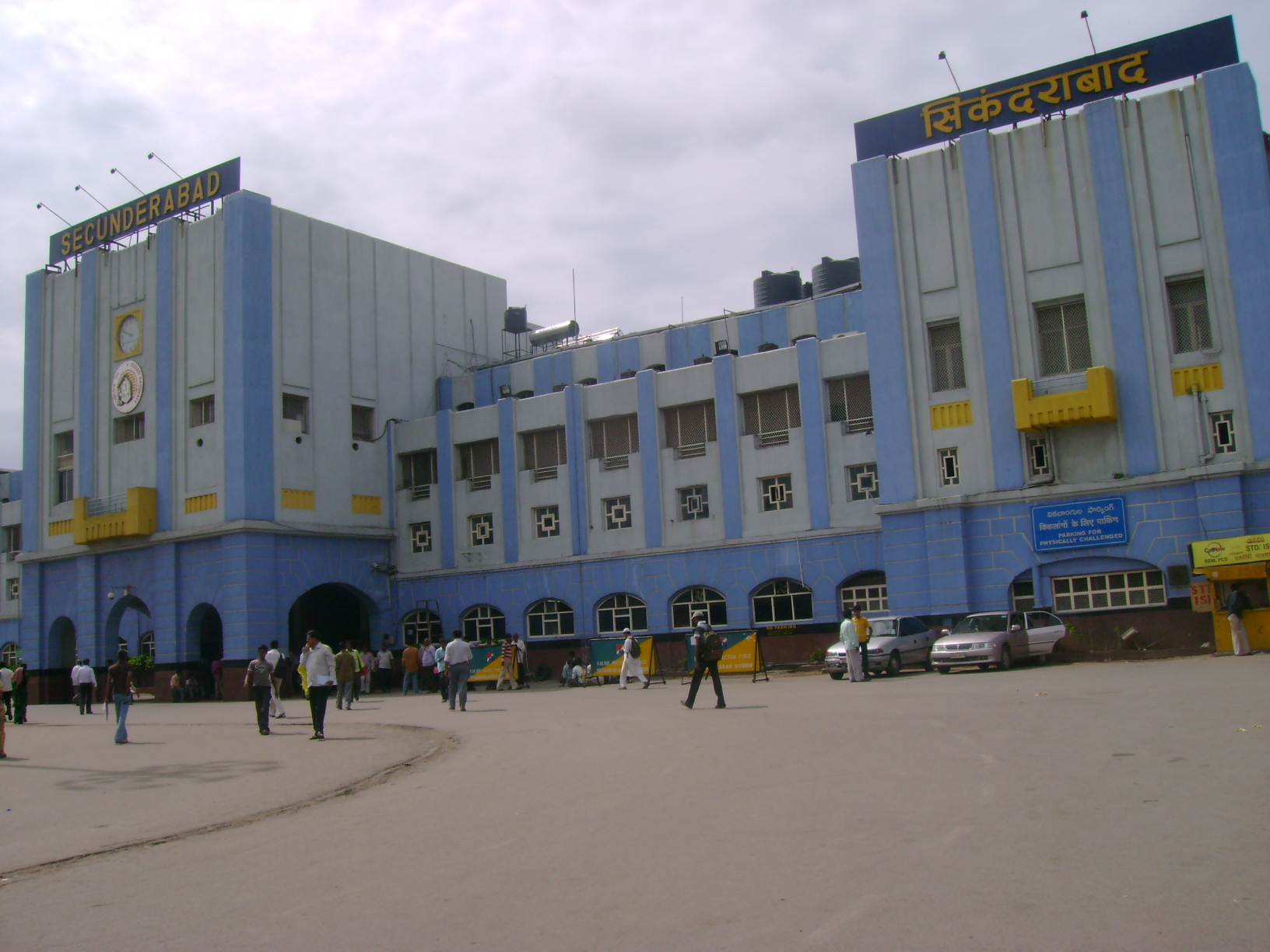
Secunderabad railway station

=== Irrigation projects ===
Project	District	River
Nizam Sagar	Kamareddy	Manjira
Singur Dam	Sangareddy	Manjira
Kaleshwaram	Jayashankar Bhupalpally	Godavari
Sriram Sagar	Nizamabad	Godavari
Sripada Yellampalli	Mancherial	Godavari
Nagarjuna Sagar	Nalgonda	Krishna
Srisailam	Nagarkurnool	Krishna
Koil Sagar	Mahabubnagar	Krishna
Jurala	Jogulamba Gadwal	Krishna
Lower Manair Dam	Karimnagar	Maner
Mid Manair Dam	Rajanna Sircilla	Maner
Upper Manair Dam	Rajanna Sircilla	Maner
Osman Sagar	Ranga Reddy district	Musi
Himayat Sagar	Ranga Reddy district	Musi

=== Public transport ===
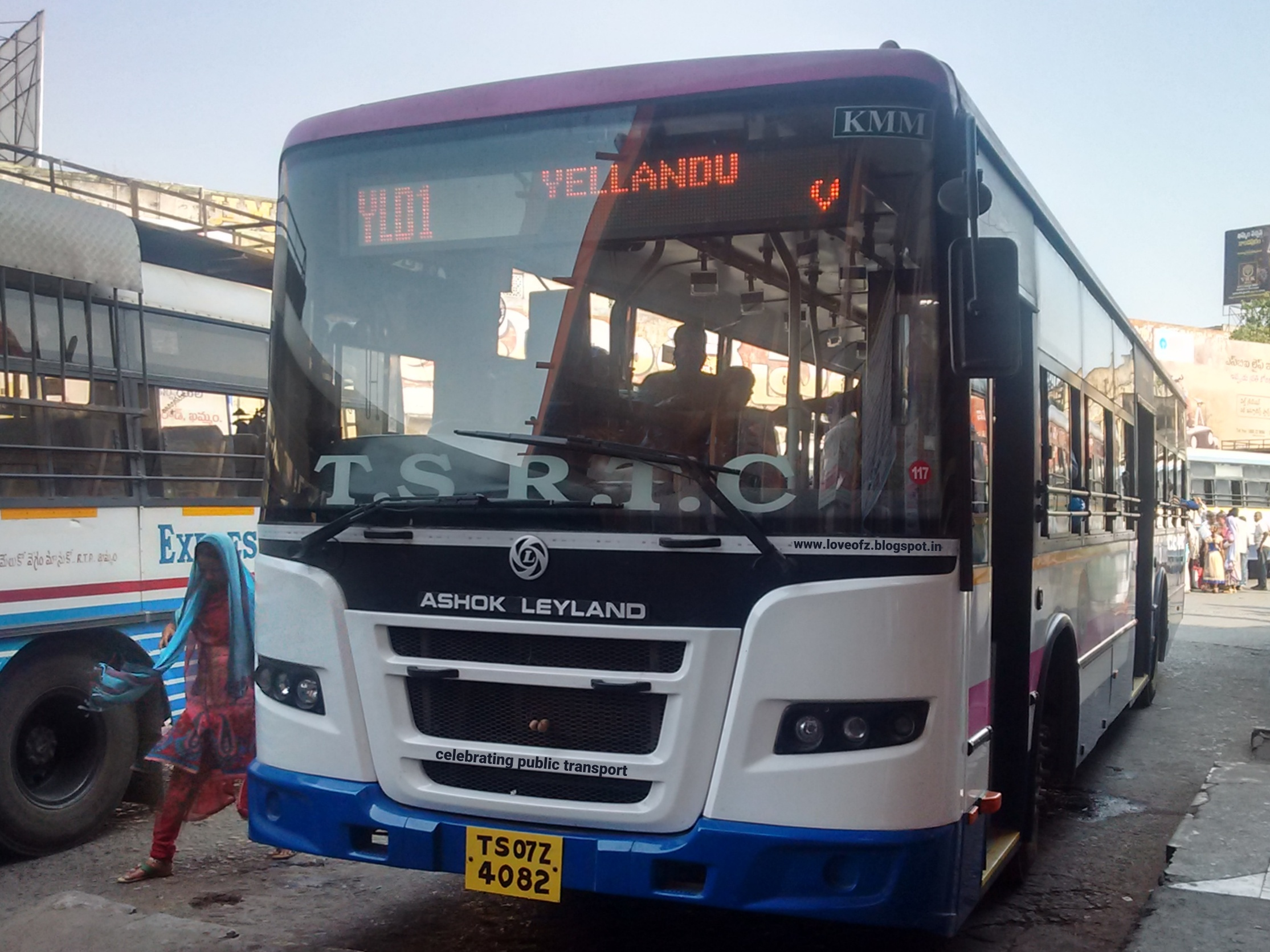
Telangana State Road Transport Corporation (TGSRTC) bus

The state is well connected with other states by means of road, rail and airways. The Telangana State Road Transport Corporation (TGSRTC) is the major public transport corporation that connects all the cities and villages. Mahatma Gandhi Bus Station (MGBS) in Hyderabad is the central bus-station of the state. Jubilee Bus Station in Secunderabad serves intercity bus services.

=== Roadways ===
The state has a total of 16 national highways and accounts for a total length of 3,550.69 km (2,206.30 mi).

=== Railways ===
The history of railways in this region dates back to 1874, during the rule of Nizam of Hyderabad. The Nizam's Guaranteed State Railway had its beginnings in a line built privately by the Nizam. Much to the dismay of the British authorities, the Nizam bore all the expenses for the construction of the line.

Today, it operates under the auspices of the South Central Railway founded in 1966. The landmark building Rail Nilayam in Secunderabad is the Zonal Headquarters office of South Central Railway. Secunderabad and Hyderabad are the main divisions of the South Central Railway that fall in the state.

=== Airports ===
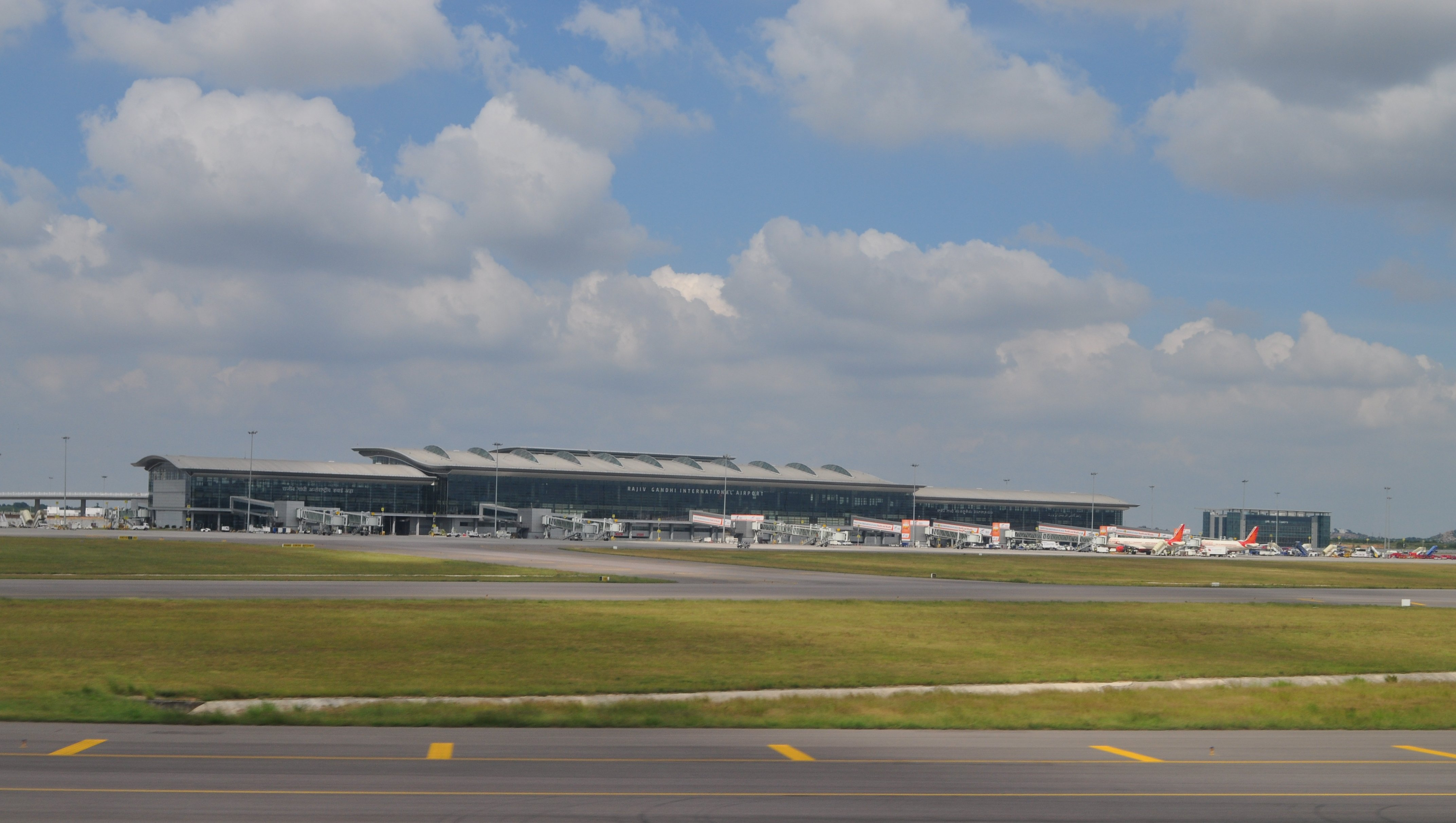
Rajiv Gandhi International Airport

Rajiv Gandhi International Airport at Shamshabad is an international airport serving the city of Hyderabad. It is the largest airport in the state and one of the busiest airports in the country. The government has plans to upgrade Warangal Airport, Nizamabad Airport and Ramagundam Airport - with plans to construct airports in Ramagundam and Kothagudem using the UDAN scheme.

Warangal has a domestic airport in Mamunooru which was established in the year 1930 during the Nizam period. All the exports and imports of Azam Jahi Mills, Warangal were done through the Warangal Airport.

== Culture ==
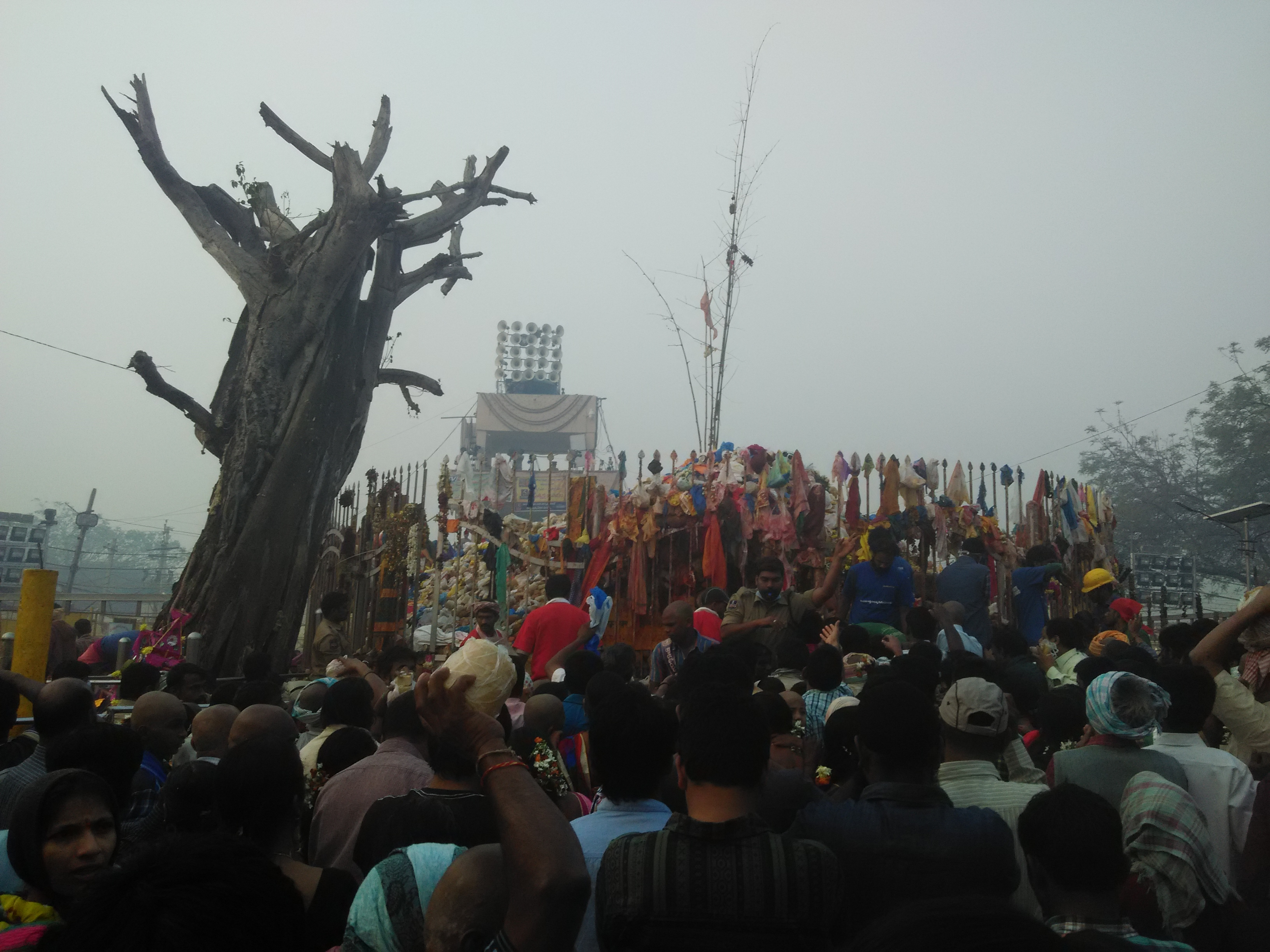
Sammakka Saralamma Jatara is a famous Hindu festival in Telangana.

The state has a rich tradition in classical music, painting and folk performance arts such as Burra katha, Tholu bommalata (shadow puppet show), and Perini Shivatandavam, Gussadi dance, Kolatam and Bathukamma.

The important festivals of the state are Bonalu and Bathukamma.

=== Architecture ===
Badami Chalukya architecture is spread across the state, notable temple is Alampur Jogulamba Temple.

Chalukyas of Vemulavada built many temples such as Bheemeshvara temple, Raja Rajeswara Temple, Vemulawada.

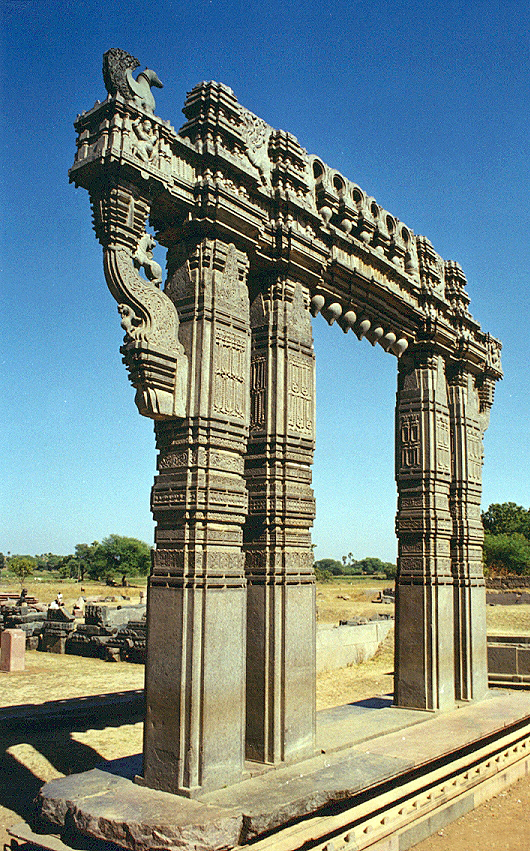
Kakatiya Kala Thoranam within the Warangal Fort

Medieval forts such as the Bhongir Fort, Khammam Fort, and Rachakonda Fort are spread across the state. Among the notable ones is the Warangal Fort, which served as the capital of the Kakatiya dynasty. The Kakatiya Kala Thoranam within the fort has become a symbol of Telangana, and features on the state emblem. Ramappa Temple is a UNESCO World Heritage Site. The fort complex, and Thousand Pillar Temple, are on the tentative list of the UNESCO World Heritage sites.

Kollapur, and Jataprole Samsthanams, Gadwal Samsthanam built temples in Dravidian architecture.

The Qutb Shahi dynasty established the city of Hyderabad as their capital. The Charminar, Golconda Fort, and Qutb Shahi tombs in Hyderabad were built by kings of the Qutb Shahi dynasty.

The Nizam era saw the construction of palaces such as the Chowmahalla Palace and Falaknuma Palace, as well as elaborate public buildings such as the Osmania General Hospital and Osmania University, all in Hyderabad.

==== Places of Worship ====
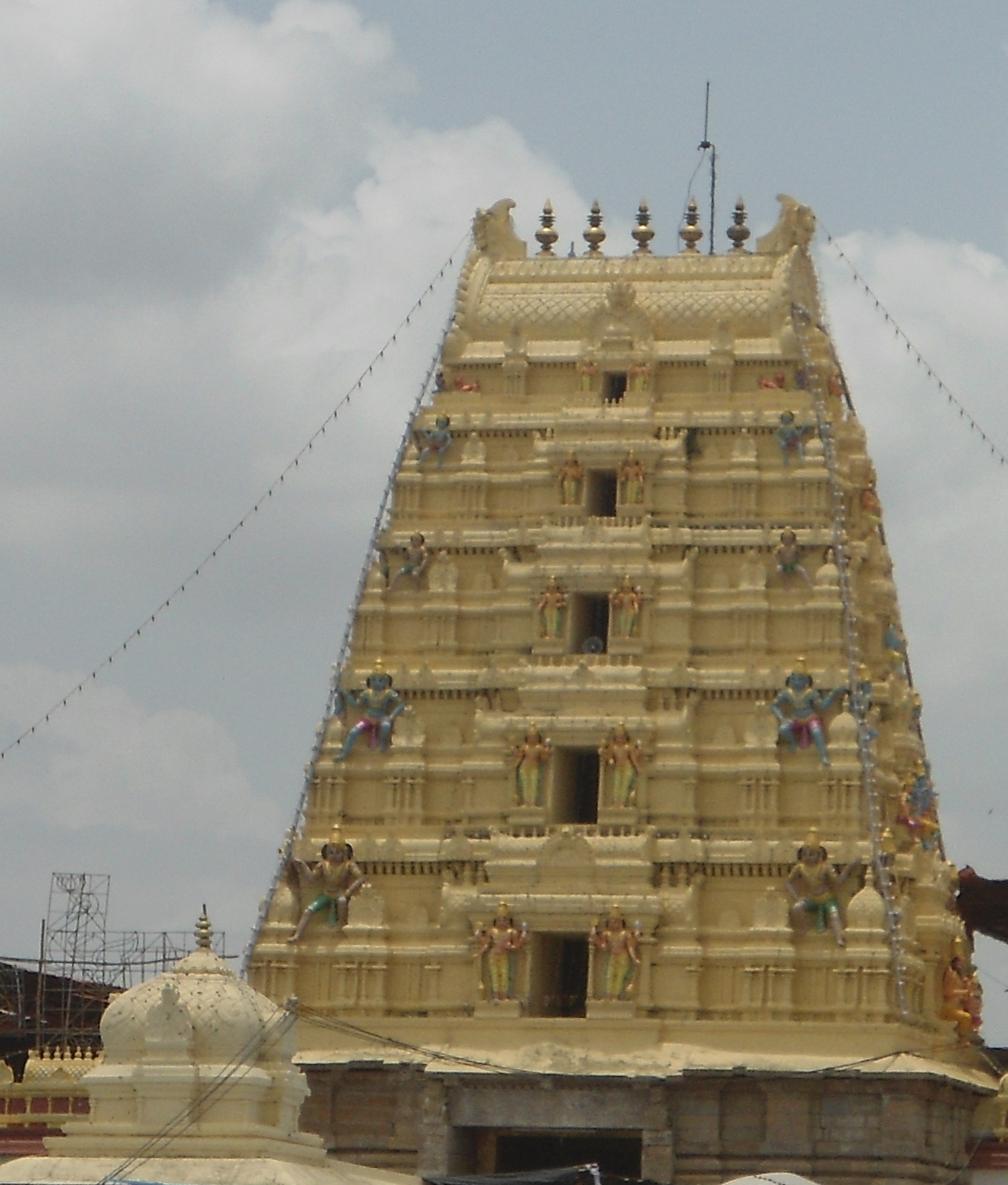
Sita Ramachandraswamy temple, Bhadrachalam

The state is home to places of worship built for different religions.

Hindu places of worship include Bhadrachalam Temple, Gnana Saraswati Temple, Yadagirigutta Temple, Ramappa Temple, Vemulawada Raja Rajeshwara temple, Kondagattu Anjaneya Swamy Temple, the Thousand Pillar Temple, and the Statue of Equality (Ramanuja).

Muslims worship at holy places such as Makkah Masjid near Charminar, Khairtabad Mosque, Mian Mishk Masjid, Toli Masjid and Spanish Mosque.

Christian places of worship include the Diocese of Dornakal of the Church of South India, Bahe Church of South India, and Medak Cathedral. There are also some Buddhist destinations, such as Nelakondapalli, Dhulikatta, Phanigiri and Kolanpaka.

Parsi Fire Temple, Secunderabad is a place of worship for the Parsis.

=== Cinema ===
Telugu cinema, also known by its sobriquet as Tollywood, is a part of Indian cinema producing films in the Telugu language, and is centred in the Hyderabad, Telangana neighbourhood of Film Nagar. In the early 1990s, the Telugu film industry had largely shifted from Chennai to Hyderabad. The Telugu film industry is the second-largest film industry in India next to Bollywood. In the years 2005, 2006 and 2008 the Telugu film industry produced the largest number of films in India, exceeding the number of films produced in Bollywood. The industry holds the Guinness World Record for the largest film production facility in the world.

=== Cuisine ===
Telangana cuisine is a unique and delicious cuisine that is influenced by the region's rich history of deccan and Telugu culture. The cuisine is known for its use of spices, millets, and rotis. Telangana cuisine also features a variety of other dishes, including biryani, haleem, and kebabs.

=== Visual arts ===
Indigenous art forms of Telangana include the Cheriyal scroll painting, Nirmal paintings, and Karimnagar Silver Filigree. A distinctive Persianate style of painting, called Deccan painting developed in the region during the medieval period.

Notable museums in the state include the Salar Jung Museum, which is one of the largest in India, Telangana State Archaeology Museum, City Museum, and Nizam Museum in Hyderabad, Warangal Museum in Warangal, and Alampur Museum in Alampur.

== Education ==
Telangana has multiple institutes of higher education along with numerous primary and secondary schools. The Department of Higher Education deals with matters relating to education at various levels in the state.

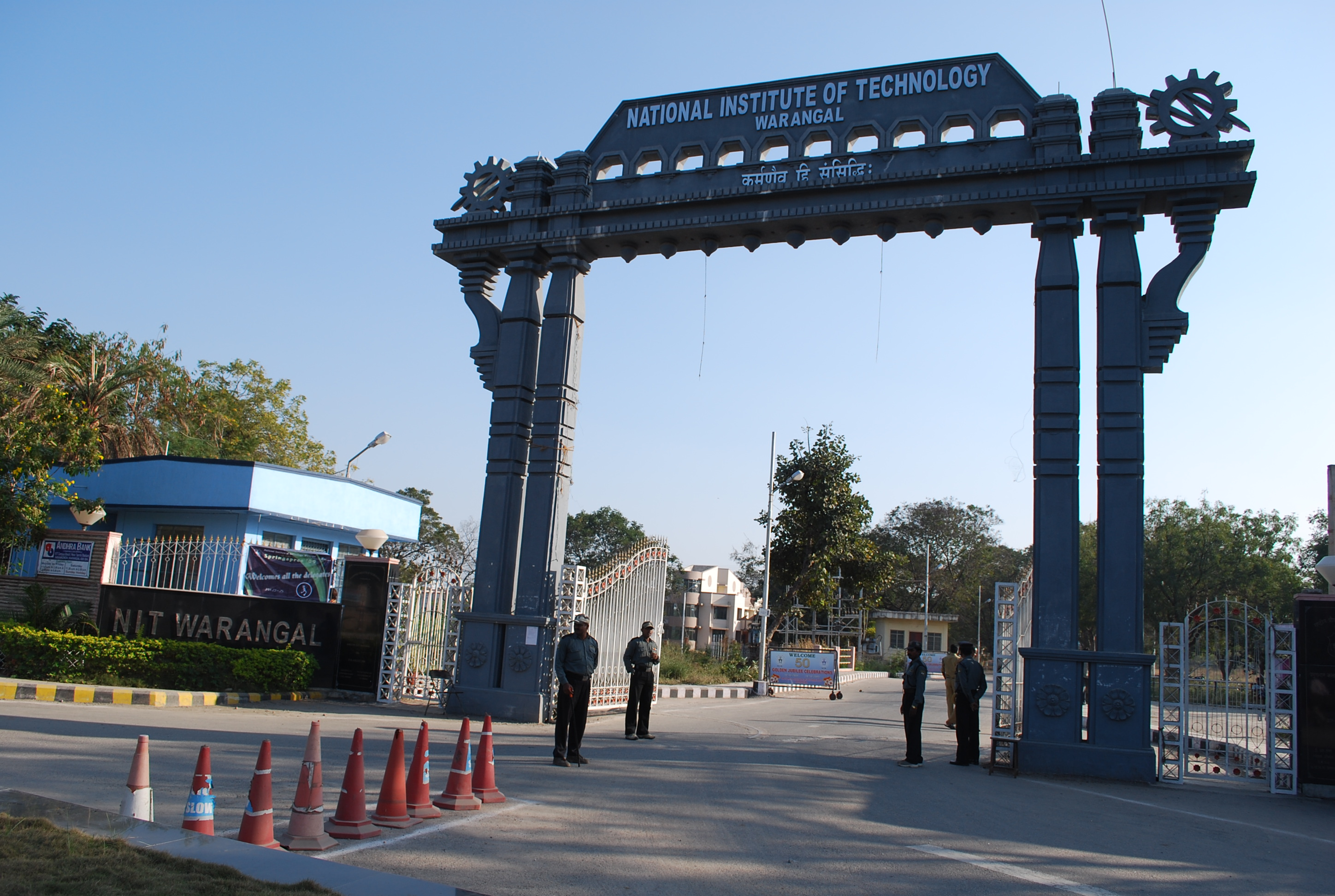
Main gate of NIT Warangal

According to a 2019 report, the state has a literacy rate of 72.8%, which is one of the lowest in India. Schools in Telangana are run by the state government or private organisations, which include religious institutions. Some specialised schools such as the Kendriya Vidyalayas and Jawahar Navodaya Vidyalayas are run by agencies of the central government. As of 2017, there are 41,337 schools in the state, with about 70% of them being government schools.

Telangana is home to 27 universities, which include three central universities, 17 state universities, two deemed universities, and five private universities. The Osmania University in Hyderabad, established in 1918, is the oldest modern university in the state, and one of the largest university systems in the world. The University of Hyderabad consistently ranks among the top universities in the country. Apart from these, specialised Institutes of National Importance in the state include AIIMS Bibinagar, IIT Hyderabad, and NIT Warangal.

Other notable institutions include Indian School of Business, ICFAI Business School Hyderabad, Jawaharlal Nehru Technological University, Hyderabad, Kakatiya University, International Institute of Information Technology, Hyderabad, NALSAR University of Law, Kaloji Narayana Rao University of Health Sciences, National Institute of Fashion Technology Hyderabad, Footwear Design and Development Institute, National Institute of Pharmaceutical Education and Research, Hyderabad, and Rajiv Gandhi University of Knowledge Technologies, Basar, among others.

== Sports ==
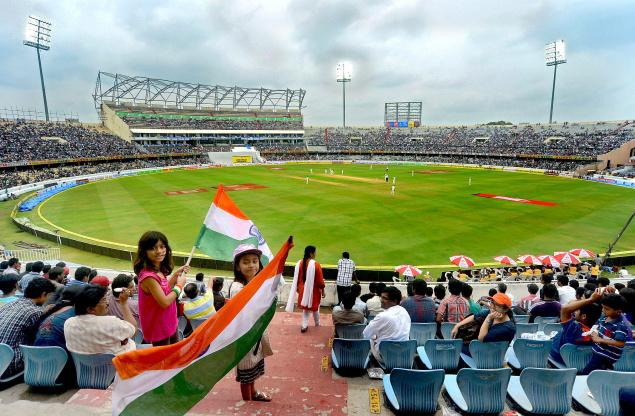
Rajiv Gandhi International Cricket Stadium

The Hyderabad FC is a professional football club based in Hyderabad and plays in top-tier league of India, the Indian Super League. The home ground of the club is G.M.C Balayogi Athletic Stadium, in Gachibowli.

The Hyderabad cricket team is represented in the Ranji Trophy and has won twice. The Sunrisers Hyderabad, an Indian Premier League franchise, is based in Hyderabad and has won the trophy once. Deccan Chargers, a currently defunct franchise from Hyderabad, also won the Indian Premier League once. The Rajiv Gandhi International Cricket Stadium is the home ground of both Hyderabad cricket team and Sunrisers Hyderabad. It hosts international as well as domestic matches.

The Hyderabad Hunters, a Premier Badminton League franchise; the Telugu Titans, a Pro Kabaddi League franchise; the Hyderabad Sky, a UBA Pro Basketball League franchise and the Telugu Tigers, a Premier Futsal franchise are also based in Hyderabad. Hyderabad Hunters have won the Premier Badminton League title.

Other stadiums include G. M. C. Balayogi Athletic Stadium, Lal Bahadur Shastri Stadium and Gachibowli Indoor Stadium.

== See also ==
- Hyderabad State
- Hyderabad State (1948–1956)
- List of people from Telangana
- Satavahana dynasty
- Telangana Language Day
- List of cities and towns in Telangana
