= Jayadheer Tirumala Rao =

Indian scholar

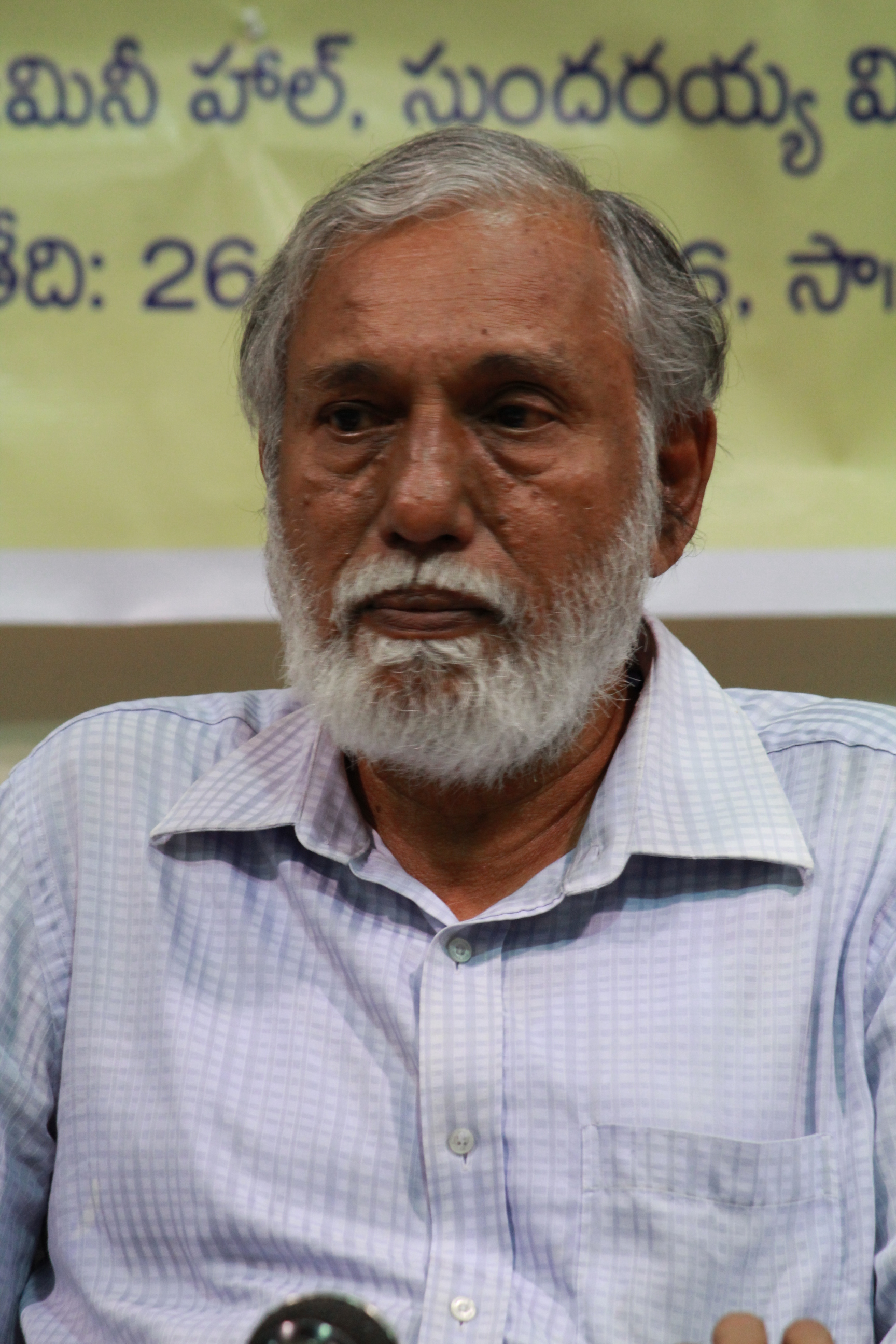
- Born: Repalle Tirumala Rao; 20 June 1950 (age 76); Warangal
- Education: Potti Sreeramulu Telugu University
- Occupations: folk researcher, historian, poet

Jayadheer Tirumala Rao (born 20 June 1950) is a professor, poet, and historian from Telangana, India. He has been researching about tribal people and their culture for more than 35 years.

== Life ==
Jayadheer Tirumala Rao graduated from Telugu university in 1974. He became interested in studying the Gonds and Chenchu tribes spread in southern Indian forests. He gathered the oral histories of several tribes like Koyas as part of his research.

He was elected as the president of Telangana writers forum in 2014.

In 2017, he conducted an exhibition in Ravindra Bharathi, Hyderabad with the items he had collected from various places in the Deccan Plateau. In 2019, an open music exhibition was conducted showcasing more than 100 varieties of musical instruments collected by him. In 2021, he organized another exhibition which showcased rare manuscripts at State Art Gallery, Madhapur.

He documented the oral history of Sammakka Saralamma popular deities among the tribal people.

He promotes state policy changes to continue the tribal arts and culture for future generations.

== Works ==
He wrote a series of essays with the title Tovva Muchatlu in Andhra Bhoomi from 2011 to 2018. In these articles he depicted cultural, economic, and socio-political issues.

He wrote three poetry books: Aranya Nethram, Prathi Dhvanulu, Aagraha Geethalu.
