= Continental Hospitals =

Indian hospital

- Company type: Private company
- Industry: Health care
- Founded: 2013
- Founder: Dr. Guru N Reddy
- Headquarters: Hyderabad, India
- Number of locations: Financial District, Gachibowli
- Area served: India, Sudan, Zambia, Uganda, Zimbabwe, Uzbekistan, United States
- Key people: Guru N Reddy (Founder & Managing Director); T Raghunath Reddy (Director); Rishi N Reddy (Director); Rev Reddy (Director)
- Website: continentalhospitals.com

Continental Hospitals is a multi-specialty hospital in India. It is founded by Guru N Reddy in 2013 in Hyderabad.

== History ==
Continental Hospitals was founded by Guru N Reddy in April 2013 in Hyderabad. DR Guru N Reddy is the first Asian president of county medical society in the country, President of Houston Academy of Medicine and serving as the Chair of Hospital Council Chiefs of Staff of 83 hospitals. Indian actor, director and producer Krishna was admitted to the hospital in his last days.

The first primary healthcare founded in IIT Hyderabad by Continental Hospitals in March 2022.

In Dec 2022, IHH Healthcare Bhd sold its 62.2% stake to Continental Hospitals Hyderabad.

In April 2023, the hospital's team of doctors performed first robot-assisted CABG procedure in India.

Time to time the hospitals organize Medication Safety and Clinical related events.

== Centres ==
Continental Hospitals is one of the region's largest hospitals in Hyderabad, India. The hospital facilities are served to regions in India, Sudan, Zambia, Uganda, Zimbabwe, Uzbekistan, and the United States.

== Awards ==
- ASSOCHAM Award 2022 for India's Best Hospital in Technology Adoption
- AHPI Excellence Award 2022
- IIMTC's Center of Excellence Award 2016
