= Shanagonda =

Village in Telangana, India

Shanagonda is a village (Gram Panchayat) in Odela mandal, Peddapalli district in Telangana state, India. Located 5 km from the mandal headquarters and 30 km from district headquarters (Peddapalli), Shanagonda sits between the villages of Pothkapalli and Indurthi, in the same mandal. Shanagonda was previously part of the Karimnagar district. The village contains a primary school, as well as two temples, the Hanuman temple and Renuka Yellamma temple.

The total population of Shanagonda is 2,499, consisting of 1,261 males and 1,238 females, who occupy a total of 615 houses. The area of Shanagonda village is 938 hectares.

== Transport ==
Shanagonda is a well-connected village when it comes to transport. The nearest railway station is Potkapalli station in Secunderabad – Hyderabad, around 1 km from the village. The bus route from Sultanabad to Jammikunta also goes through the village.

=== Road ===
Jammikunta is the nearest town to Shanagonda, located 20 km from Shanagonda by road.

=== Rail ===
Potkapalli railway station and Jammikunta railway station are the nearest railway stations to Shanagonda. Peddapalli railway station could also be considered as a nearby option for rail links.

Kazipet railway station and Mancherial railway station are the principal connecting stations to Shanagonda, both of which provide road access to Karimnagar. However, Kazipet Jn railway station is the major station, and is 54 km (54 minutes) from Shanagonda.
