= 8th Incline Colony =

8 Incline colony (Godavarikhani) Colony (GDK) Jallaram/RG-2 Area
- Smart Town
- Nickname: Smart:Decent colony
- Location in Telangana State, India 8 Incline colony (Godavarikhani) (India)
- Coordinates: 18.751892°N 79.513311°E
- Country: India
- State: Telangana
- Region: Deccan
- District: Peddapalli
- Founder: Singareni collieries company limited
- Named for: Mine Employees Residents Colony

Government
  - Type: Mayor
  - Body: Ramagundam
  - Rank: 5 (Ramagundam)

Population (2015)
  - Total: 170,000
- Demonym: Godavarikhanite

Languages
  - Telugu Official: Telugu
- Time zone: UTC+5:30 (IST)
- PIN: 505211
- Telephone code: 08728
- Vehicle registration: TS-22
- Website: telangana.gov.in

The 8 Incline Colony is no. 1 Model township and familiar as decent employees colony of the Singareni Collieries Company Limited located near Godavarikhani of Peddapalli district, Telangana State, of India. It is a part of the coal mining area in the Ramagundam 2 Region and Godavarikhani and near to Centenary Colony, Kalvacherla, Kamanpur, Peddapally, and Manthani.

== Transport ==
=== Road ===
8 Incline Colony is well connected to Ramagundam, Godavarikhani, Mancherial, Hanamkonda, Peddapalli and Manthani areas by bus. Godavarikhani bus depot runs city metro buses to this township by route 2 Godavarikhani to Peddapalli railway station via., 8 Inc colony, 1 route 8incline Colony to Ramagundam railway station Ordinary services like Godavarikhani-Begampeta-Odedu, Jammikunta, Adavisrirampur, Lakkaram, Dharmaram, Katkoor pass through this township. TSRTC Vajra A/C buses of MYP and HYD2 depot which runs directly from this colony connects to Miyapur and Dilsukhnagar of Hyderabad city from this township. Godavarikhani bus depot operates a super luxury bus to Hyderabad with reservation facility. Auto rickshaws are also available from bus station and Chowrasta point. Nearest bus depot and bus station is Godavarikhani which is 12 km from this town.

=== Rail ===
Ramagundam and Peddapalle railway stations are the nearest railway stations to reach this town. Best commuting station is Ramagundam as it is connected well.
