= List of state highways in Telangana =

This is a list of state highways in Telangana State, India. The SH 1 is named as Rajiv Rahadhari (highway).

== List ==
Number	Length (km)	Length (mi)	Southern or western terminus	Northern or eastern terminus	Formed	Removed	Notes
SH 1	237	147	Hyderabad Shamirpet - Karimnagar - Peddapalli - Ramagundam		—	—	
SH 2	86	53	Narkatpally Nalgonda Nagarjuna Sagar Dam		—	—	
SH 7	60	37	Karimnagar Choppadandi Dharmaram Velgatoor Rayapatnam Bridge on the Godavari River		—	—	
SH 11	137	85	Karimnagar Sircilla Kamareddy Yellareddy		—	—	
SH 15	112	70	Medak Nyalkal Zaheerabad		—	—	
SH 19	131	81	Hyderabad Ibrahimpatnam Peddavoora Nagarjuna Sagar		—	—	
SH 20	96.4	59.9	Mahabubnagar Nagarkurnool Achampet Srisailam Rd		—	—	
SH 21	70	43	Jadcherla Wanaparthy Kothakota		—	—	
SH 22	78.2	48.6	Erravalli Chowrasta Gadwal Raichur		—	—	
SH 23	86.2	53.6	Gadwal Ieeja Mantralayam		—	—	
SH 24	108	67	Nirmal Khanapur Kaddam Jannaram NH 63 road at Gudem		—	—	

== See also ==
- List of national highways in India by state
- National Highways Development Project
