= Devunipalli =

Village in India

Coordinates: 18°10′N 77°52′E

Devunipalli is a small village under the Andugulapalli Gram Panchayat in Peddapalli district in Telangana state, India, It is located 2 km from Andugulapalli and 6 km from Peddapalli.

== Gallery ==
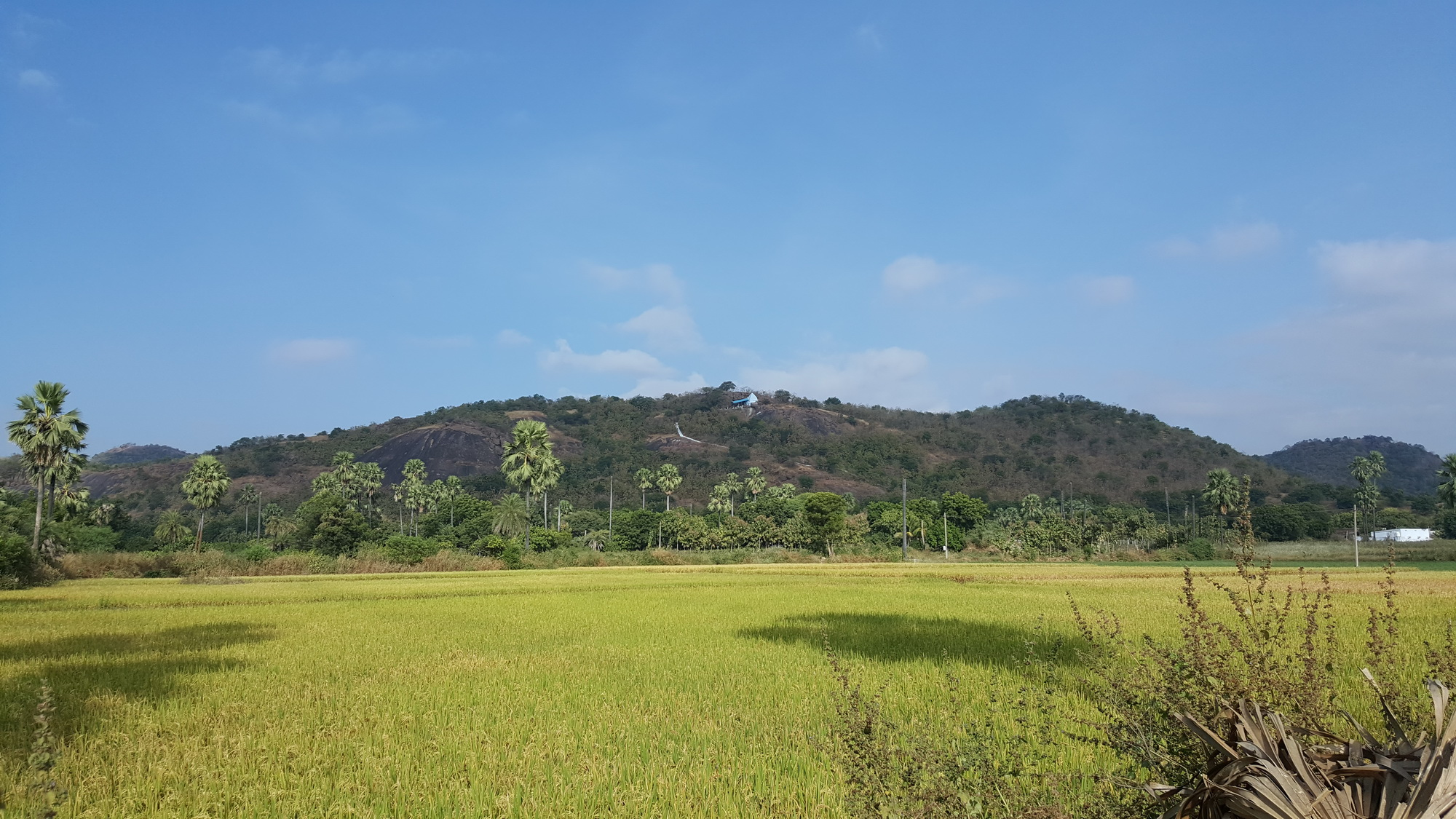
Devunipalli Hill

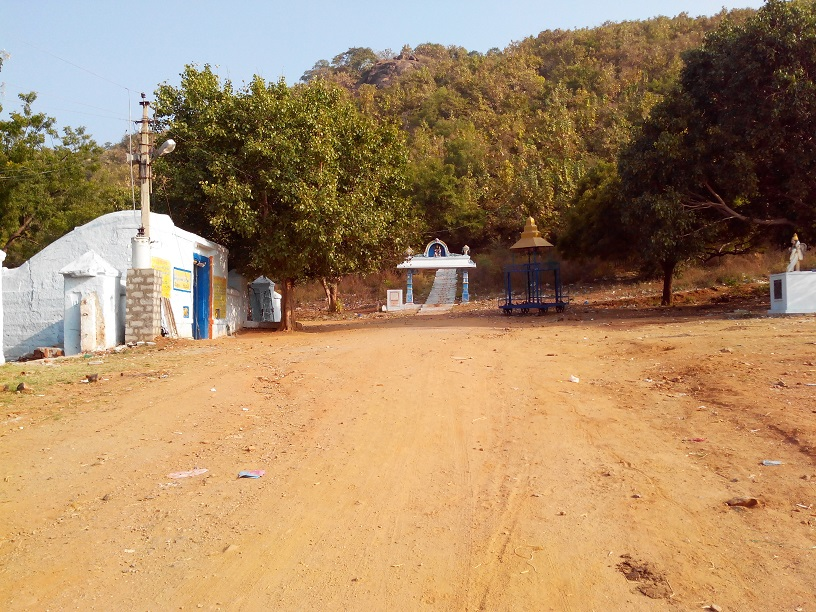
Neat Devunipalli Temple
