= Kalvacherla =

- Village
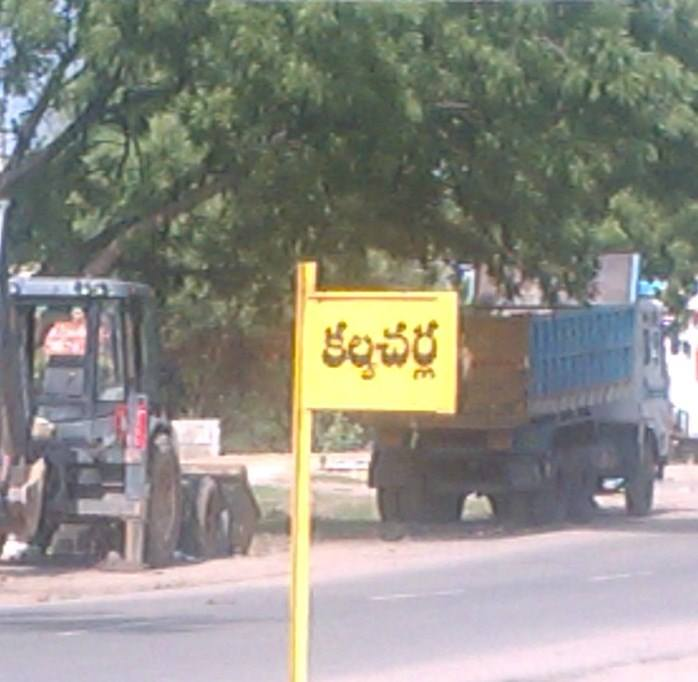
- Kalvacherla Name Plate at Kalvacherla
- Nicknames: Kalwacherla, Kalvacharla
- Location within Telangana Location within India
- Coordinates: 18°38′12.96″N 79°31′49.19″E
- Country: India
- State: Telangana
- Region: Deccan
- District: Peddapalli

Government
  - Body: Gram panchayat
  - Sarpanch: Ganta Padma

Area
  - Total: 12.37 km^{2} (4.78 sq mi)

Population (2011)
  - Total: 4,558

Languages
  - Official: Telugu,
- Time zone: UTC+5:30 (IST)
- PIN: 505212
- Telephone code: 91-8728-
- Vehicle registration: TS 22
- Sex ratio: 1.006162 ♂/♀
- Planning agency: Gram panchayat
- Climate: Tropical (Köppen)
- Avg. annual temperature: 31 °C (88 °F)
- Avg. summer temp.: 37 °C (99 °F)
- Avg. winter temperature: 22 °C (72 °F)
- Website: telangana.gov.in

Kalvacherla is a village of Ramagiri mandal located in the Peddapalli district of the state of Telangana in India. Kalvacherla is located 17 km (11 mi) away from District Headquarters.

== Demographics ==
Kalvacherla's regional language is Telugu. The total population of Kalvacherla in 2011 was 4,558, living in a total of 1,064 homes.

== Transportation ==
Ramagundam Godavarikhani is the nearest city to Kalvacherla which 18 kilometres away. The closest bus stations are Godavarikhani and Manthani TSRTC stations. TSRTC Godavarikhani, Manthani runs many number of buses from major cities which pass through Kalvacherla. There is no railway station near to Kalvacherla in less than 10 km. However, there are railway stations nearby Peddapalli, Ramagundam railway stations is 20 to 30 km from this village.

== Government ==
Ganta Padma was elected as sarpanch in the most recent election of January 2019.

== Tourism ==
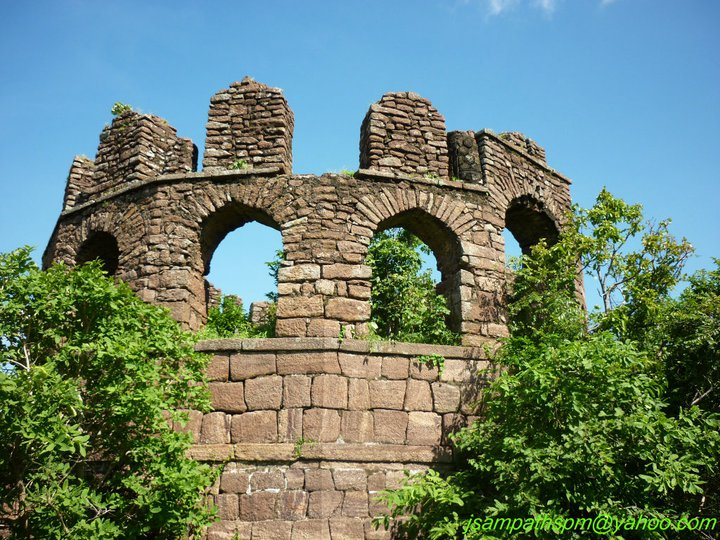
Ramagiri Fort

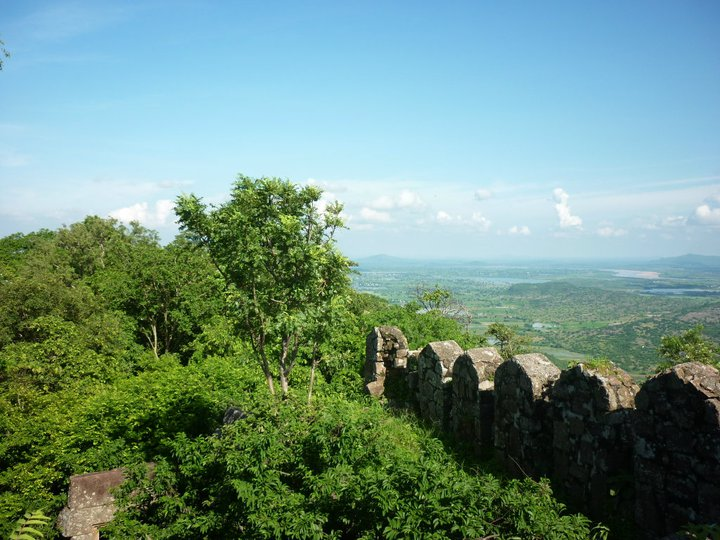
Ramagiri Fort Angle

Ramagiri Fort or Ramgiri Khilla in the Peddapalli District of Telangana, is a picturesque hilltop fort. It has a view of the merging of the rivers Manair and Godavari river. There is an abundance of ayurvedic herbs and a large variety of flora and fauna.

Sabbitham Waterfalls, Kalvacherla to Sabbitham waterfalls nearby (10 km). It is located in Sabbitham Village and District in fact after changing it is in Peddapalli District. It is a natural waterfall very well located place in trees. It has become popular from few years. It is not seen throughout the year it has very good flow of water in rainy season spring and winter.

== Education ==
- JNTUH College of Engineering Manthani, near Centenary Colony, Peddapalli district
- Horticulture polytechnic college:CNC
- Pragathi Degree College, Kalvacherla
- Pragathi Jr College, Kalvacherla
- Zilla Parishad High School, Kalvacherla
- Pragathi High School, Kalvacherla
- Vani Secondary School, Centenary colony
- Hill Fort High School, Centenary colony
