= Centenary Colony =

Centenary Colony (GDK) CNC
- Colony (coalbelt colony)
- Location in Telangana, India
- Coordinates: 18°38′9.837″N 79°32′59.63″E
- Country: India
- State: Telangana
- Region: Telangana
- District: Peddapalli

Government
  - Body: Ramagundam

Languages
  - Official: Telugu, Hindi
- Time zone: UTC+5:30 (IST)
- PIN: 505212
- Telephone code: 08728
- Vehicle registration: TS-22
- Nearest city: Ramagundam
- Lok Sabha constituency: Peddapalli
- Telangana Legislative Assembly constituency: Manthani

Centenary colony is the Mandal Headquarters for Ramagiri Mandal and it is a township of the Singareni Collieries Company located near to 8th Incline Colony, Godavarikhani, in Peddapalli district, Telangana state, India. The name "centenary" given to the colony as a significance for digging the coal from past 100 years.

In 1991, the population was 936.
