= Gully Gang =

2020 film

- Directed by: Vinay Tambireddy
- Screenplay by: Vinay Tambireddy
- Story by: Kumar Mallarapu
- Produced by: Sameer Datta
- Starring: Sameer Datta; Shivanya Mehrara; Bhumika; Sindhu; Sudiksha Jah; Ammulu RK; Swetha; Muktevi Prakasa Rao; Daya Narsing; Damera Rajesh; Radhika; Santhosh Suram
- Cinematography: Rajesh Avala
- Edited by: Shiva Sarvani
- Music by: K Ramakrishna
- Production company: Movie Bees Media
- Distributed by: Airtelextream, Sur Movies exclusive and AR Entertainments
- Release date: 11 February 2020
- Running time: 130 min
- Country: India
- Language: Telugu

Gully Gang is a 2022 Indian Telugu-language romantic comedy film directed by debutant director Vinay Tambireddy and Produced by Sameer Datta under the banner of Movie Bees Media. It stars debutants Sameer Datta, Shivanya Mehrara and Sudiksha Jah.

== Plot ==
Gully Gang is a coming-of-age drama that explores the tumultuous journey of a young boy named Srinu, hailing from the village of Peddampet. The movie begins with a gripping scene of Srinu contemplating his life's end in front of an approaching train, setting the stage for a narrative that delves into the complexities of love, friendship, and self-discovery.

Srinu, part of the energetic "9 Gang" with his friends, is initially hesitant about the idea of love. Encouraged by his friend Malli, he seeks guidance from a love expert named 'Prem ji.' However, his attempts at wooing three girls end in a violent confrontation, leading him to take up karate for revenge. This decision results in an unexpected twist when Srinu accidentally kicks his karate master, leading to further challenges.

Despite initial setbacks, Srinu eventually falls for a girl named Sandhya. However, his attempt to express his feelings takes an unexpected turn when Sandhya addresses him as a brother. Devastated but determined, Srinu tries to feign sadness to win her over but is interrupted by news of a girl visiting his house. This time, Srinu's hopes are shattered as the girl, Sampangi, falls in love with his brother.

As disappointments mount, Srinu transforms into an angry young man and gains notoriety as the rowdy of his college. The plot thickens as new characters, including Murali and Kumari, enter the scene. Srinu's protective instincts emerge when Gopal harasses Kumari, leading to a confrontation that further complicates the relationships. Kumari's father misunderstands the situation, causing her to leave college.

Srinu's attempts to rescue Kumari from her engagement with Murali take an unexpected turn when a mysterious biker enters the picture. The revelation that Kumari joins the biker leaves both Srinu and Murali in shock. Faced with the numerous failures in love and life, Srinu reaches a breaking point, contemplating suicide by standing in front of a speeding train.

The movie poignantly concludes with the message that "Love is a Gift," emphasizing the unpredictable nature of love and life's journey, with Srinu's struggles serving as a powerful backdrop for this heartfelt exploration of human emotions.

== Cast ==
- Sameer Datta as Srinu
- Shivanya Mehrara as Kumari
- Sudhiksha Jha as Sandhya
- Ammulu RK as Sampangi
- Swetha as Srinu's last lover
- M Prakash Rao as Samba
- Jenny as Premji
- Daya Narsing as Dayanna
- Damera Rajesh as Srinu's father
- Radhika as Srinu's mother
- Santhosh Suram as Shekar
- Bhumika as Navya
- Sindhu as Bhavya
- Mallikarjuna Sriramulu as Srinu's friend

== Production ==
The film marks the debut of director Vinay Tambireddy and lead actor Sameer Datta, sons of cinematographer T Surender Reddy. The actors were selected from Peddampet and Ramagundam villages and were trained in a workshop. The film was shot in Ramagundam and around Godavarikhani for 40 days. Vinay explained that shooting in Ramagundam was difficult due to the rise in mercury levels. Jenny was the only actor in the film, who wasn't a newcomer.

== Soundtrack ==
Gully gang

Soundtrack album to Gully Gang by K. Ramakrishna
- Released: 25 September 2022
- Recorded: 2018
- Genre: Feature film soundtrack
- Length: 8:47
- Language: Telugu
- Producer: Sameer Datta

The music was composed by Kandakatla Ramakrishna. and lyrics also written by Kandakatla Ramakrishna. The soundtrack consists of 4 tracks.

Track listing
No.	Title	Lyrics	Singer(s)	Length
1.	"Ninnu Nannu Kalipe"	K. Ramakrishna	Indurthi Madhu, Vaishali Prabhakar	0:56
2.	"Pilla Nee Maya"	K. Ramakrishna	K. Ramakrishna	2:12
3.	"Thanuvu Thanuvu Penavesukoni"	K. Ramakrishna	K. Ramakrishna, Rajyalakshmi	3:10
4.	"Preminchadame Papama"	K. Ramakrishna	K. Ramakrishna	2:39
Total length:				08:47
