= Eligedu =

- Village
- Location in Telangana, India Eligedu (India)
- Coordinates: 18°33′17″N 79°15′28″E
- Country: India
- State: Telangana
- District: Peddapalli
- Elevation: 261 m (856 ft)

Languages
  - Official: Telugu
- Time zone: UTC+5:30 (IST)
- PIN: 505 525
- Website: facebook.com/eligaid

Eligedu is a village and a mandal in Peddapalli district of Telangana, India. Eligaid is very near to Sultanabad and is accessible by Rajiv Rahadari (State Highway 1) from Katnapalli.
