= Botla Vanaparthy =

- village
- Location in Telangana, India Botla Vanaparthy (India)
- Coordinates: 18°43′0″N 79°15′40″E
- Country: India
- State: Telangana
- District: Peddapalli District

Government
  - Type: Panchayati raj (India)
  - Body: Gram panchayat

Languages
  - Official: Telugu
- Time zone: UTC+5:30 (IST)
- Postal Code: 505187
- Vehicle registration: TS022 (Peddapalli)
- Coastline: 0 kilometres (0 mi)
- Website: www.peddapallidistrict.com

Botla Vanaparthy is a village in Dharmaram mandal in Peddapalli district of Telangana, India. This village population is around 3000. It belongs to Dharmapuri Assembly Constituency and in Peddapalli loksabha constituency. This village consists of famous Shri Narasimha Swamy temple. The name Botla Vanaparthy came from the Surname of Botla's family. This is agriculture based village and main crops are rice and corn.

== Geography ==
Botla Vanaparthy is located at 18°43′0″N 79°15′40″E.
