= Peddapalli (disambiguation) =

Peddapalli is a town in the Indian state of Telangana.

Peddapalle or Peddapalli or Peddapally or variation, may also refer to:

- Peddapalli (Lok Sabha constituency), national constituency of the parliament of India
- Peddapalli district, a district in the Indian state of Telangana
- Peddapalli Junction railway station
- Peddapalle (Assembly constituency), state constituency of the parliament of Telangana
