= Mirzampet =

Mirzampet Mirjampet
- Village
- Location in Peddapalli dist, Telangana, India
- Coordinates: 18.4370°N 79.5589°E
- Country: India
- State: Telangana
- District: Peddapalli
- Mandal: Kalva Srirampur

Languages
  - Official: Telugu
- Time zone: UTC+5:30 (IST)
- PIN: 505153
- Vehicle registration: TS
- Website: telangana.gov.in

Mirzampet is a village in Kalva Srirampur mandal of Peddapalli district in the state of Telangana in India. Mirzampet has a population of 1,972 within its village limits, according to 2011 census. It has an average elevation of 155 meters (511 feet)

The village is connected by road. Daily there are four trips of government Bus which connects it to nearby village Jammikunta and kalva srirampur. Pothkapalli railway station in 19 km away and Jammikunta Railway station is 23 km away from Mirzempet

People of this village are mostly farmers, mainly cultivating paddy, corn and cotton.
