= Nagampeta =

Coordinates: 18°58′N 79°50′E

- village
- Interactive map of Nagampeta
- Country: India
- State: Telangana
- District: Mancherial

Population
  - Total: 2,500

Languages
  - Official: Telugu
- Time zone: UTC+5:30 (IST)
- Postal code: 505475
- Vehicle registration: TS
- Nearest city: Mancherial district, Kotapalli mandal
- Lok Sabha constituency: Chennur
- Vidhan Sabha constituency: Huzurabad
- Website: telangana.gov.in

Nagampeta is a village in the Jammikunta mandal, Karimnagar district, Telangana, India. It is 7 km northeast of Jammikunta town proper.
