= Kalva Srirampur =

- Mandal
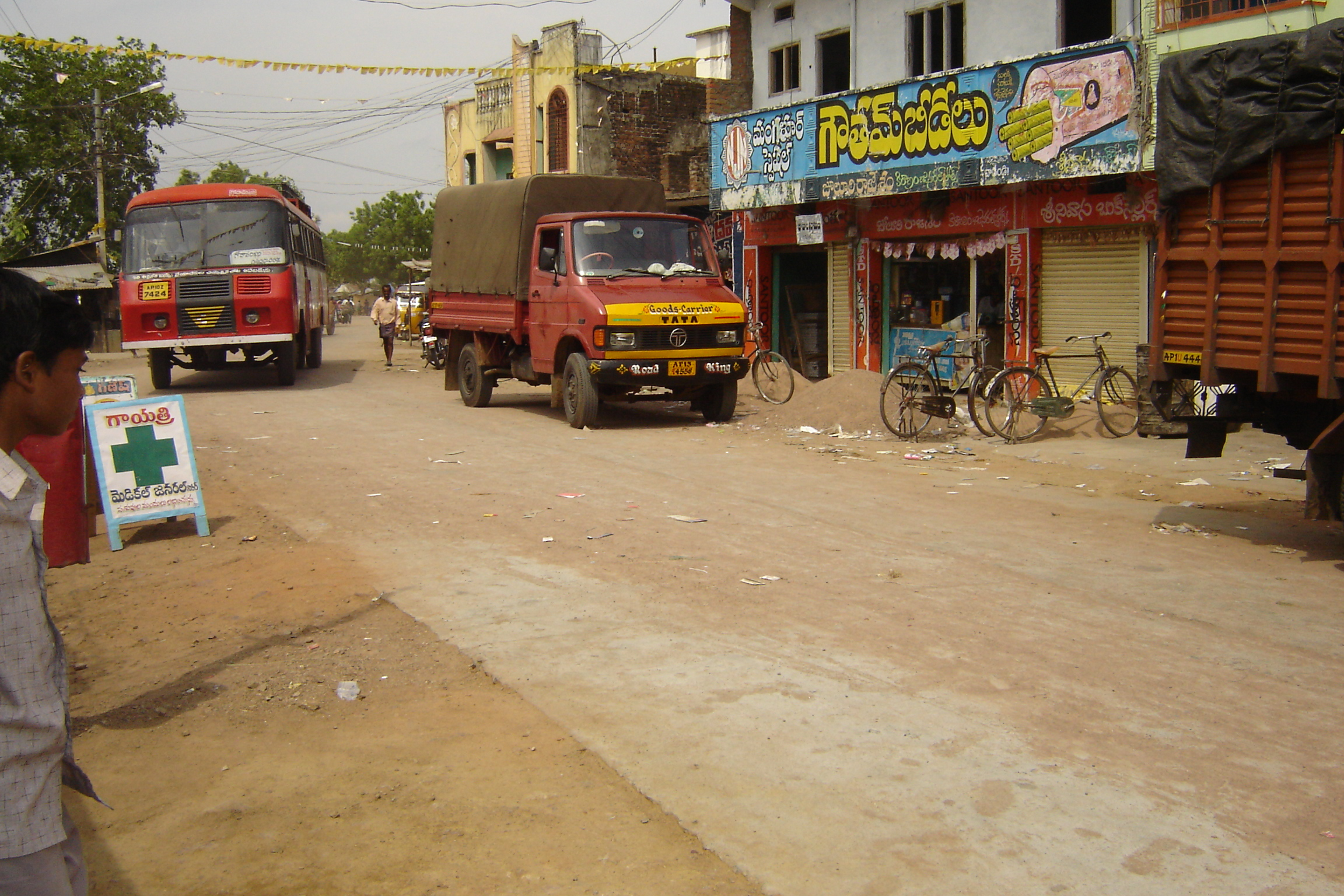

- Location in Telangana, India
- Country: India
- State: Telangana
- District: Peddapalli

Languages
  - Official: Telugu
- Time zone: UTC+5:30 (IST)

Kalva Srirampur is a mandal in the Peddapalli district of the Indian state of Telangana.

== Villages ==
Village in Kalva Srirampur Mandal

1. Edulapuram
2. Gangaram
3. Jafarkhanpet
4. Kistampet
5. Kunaram
6. Madipalle
7. Mallial
8. Mangapet
9. Mirzampet
10. Motlapalle
11. Pandilla
12. Peddampet
13. Pegadapalle
14. Rathupalle
15. Srirampur
16. Tharupalle
17. Vennampalle

== See also ==
- Odela
- Jammikunta
