= Kukkala gudur =

Kukkala gudur is a village in Palakurthy mandal of Peddapalli district in Telangana, India. The village has around 5000 total population. It is the biggest village in the mandal (Palakurthy). There are two primary schools (LKG to 5th standard) and one high school (6th to 10th standard) in this village. There is a river near by Kukkala gudur, the Godavari River.
