= Ramagundam railway station =

Railway station in Telangana, India

Ramagundam
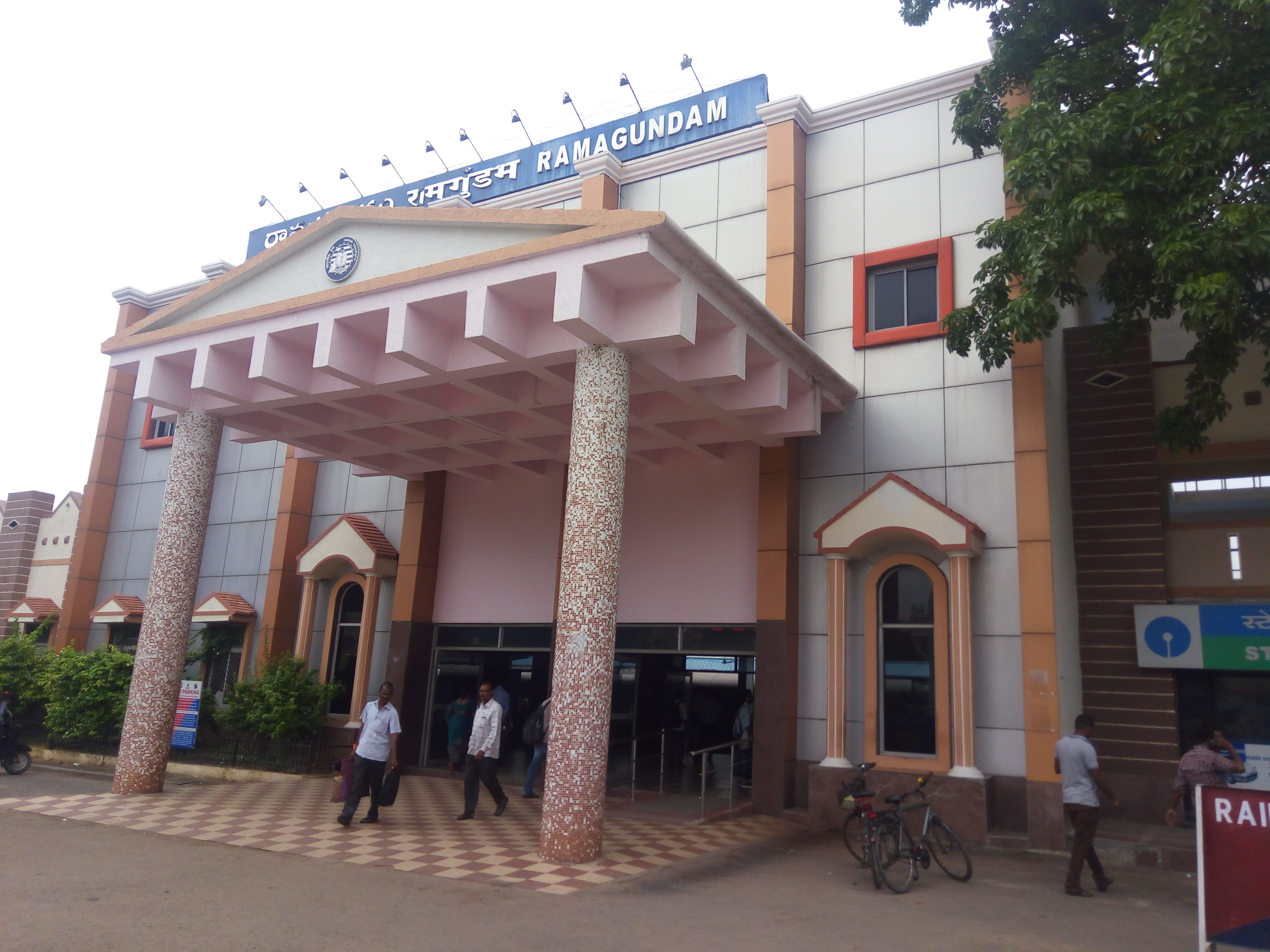
- Ramagundam railway station

General information
- Location: Ramagundam, Peddapalli district, Telangana; India
- Coordinates: 18.8000°N 79.4500°E
- Elevation: 170 metres (560 ft)
- System: Indian Railways station
- Owner: Indian Railways
- Operator: South Central Railways
- Lines: New Delhi–Chennai main line Nagpur–Secunderabad line
- Platforms: 3

Construction
- Structure type: At ground
- Parking: Available (paid)

Other information
- Status: Functional
- Station code: RDM
- Zone(s): South Central Railway zone
- Division(s): Secunderabad

History
- Opened: 1929; 97 years ago

Services
Preceding station	Indian Railways	Following station
Peddampet towards ?	South Central Railway zone New Delhi–Chennai main line Nagpur–Secunderabad line	Raghavapuram towards ?
Location
- Location within Telangana Location within India

Ramagundam railway station (station code: RDM) is a fourth grade non-suburban (NSG–4) category Indian railway station in Secunderabad railway division of South Central Railway zone. It serves the city of Ramagundam in the Indian state of Telangana. It was selected as one of the 21 stations to be developed under Amrit Bharat Stations scheme.

== History ==
With the completion of the Kazipet–Balharshah link in 1929, Chennai was directly linked to Delhi. Mainly this station surroundings has urban population passengers crowd is huge to this station with surrounding towns are Godavarikhani, Manthani, and Peddapalli. It is known as the "Grand Trunk Line". Mostly this station have maximum train halts passing through this main line.

== Electrification ==
The Balharshah–Ramagundam sector in 1987–88 was electrified. This station is famous for MGR (Merry go round) system i.e., goods or coal carriage trains continuously runs and overhauls at this station and it has a coach maintenance depot [RDM].

== Developments ==
A new 201.04 kilometres (124.92 mi) railway line has been approved by the Cabinet Committee on Economic Affairs between Balharshah and Kazipet on August 26, 2016. The new line is extremely useful from goods loading point of view with FCI at Jammikunta, Kesoram Cement at Raghavapuram, Thermal Power Stations and SCCL at Ramagundam in Telangana, and Cement Chandrapur in Maharashtra. This will facilitate both the passenger traffic and goods movement that include cement, coal and food.

Survey for new route from Manuguru to Ramagundam is completed but waiting for budget allocation from central government.

If the proposed North-South Dedicated Freight Corridor is built, currently in the planning stage, it will pass through Ramagundam station through Warangal.
