= Telangana Super Thermal Power Project =

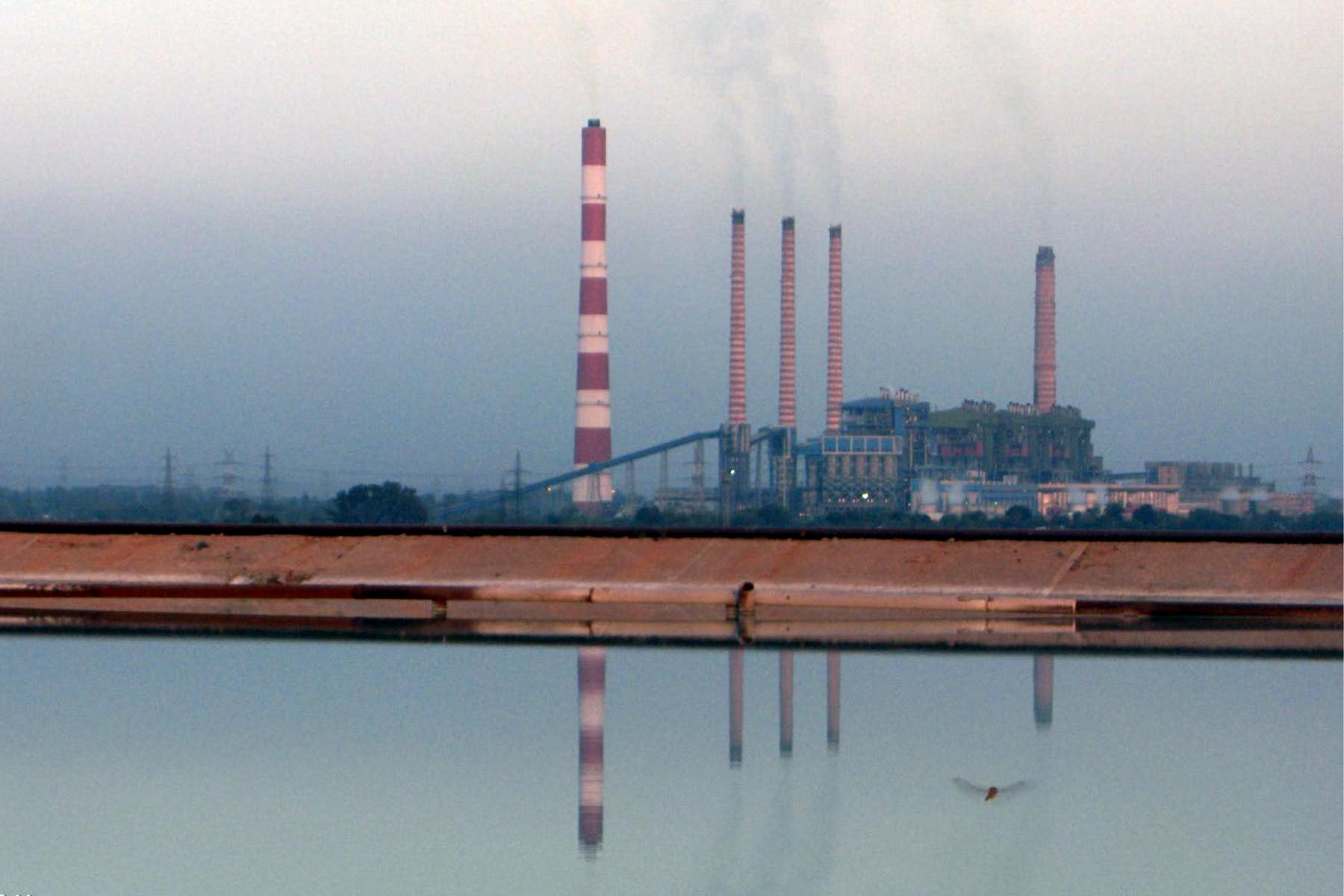
- Far view of NTPC Power Plant
- Location of the Telangana Super Thermal Power Project
- Official name: TSTPP
- Country: India
- Location: Telangana
- Coordinates: 18°45′18″N 79°28′37″E
- Status: Under construction
- Construction began: 29 January 2016
- Commission date: Unit 1: 3 October 2023
- Construction cost: 10598.98 Crores
- Operator: NTPC

Thermal power station
- Primary fuel: Coal

Power generation
- Nameplate capacity: 800 MW

Telangana Super Thermal Power Project (TSTPP) is a power plant under construction in Telangana, India. It has a power capacity of 1600 MW (2×800 MW) in its first phase and a total planned capacity of 4000 MW. It is the coal-based power plant of NTPC Limited. It is being built near Ramagundam in Peddapalli district.

The first unit, 800 MW, was inaugurated by Prime Minister Narendra Modi on 3 October 2023. The second unit was inaugurated by Modi on 4 March 2024.

== Capacity ==
The first unit of 800 MW was expected to be completed by the third quarter of 2020, but construction was halted due to COVID-19.

Unit	Capacity (In MW)	Date of Commissioning	Status
1	800	05.09.2023	Commissioned
2	800		Under construction
