= Bommareddypally =

- Village
- Location in Telangana, India Bommareddypally (India)
- Coordinates: 18.704422°N 79.156773°E
- Country: India
- State: Telangana
- District: Peddapalli
- Mandal: Dharmaram
- Talukas: Bommareddypally

Government
  - Type: Telangana Government
  - Body: Gram Panchayat

Population (2017)
  - Total: 2,000+

Languages
  - Official: Telugu
- Time zone: UTC+1:00 (IST)
- Zip Code: 505416

Bommareddypally is a village in the mandal of Dharmaram in Peddapalli district in the state of Telangana in India.

== Geography ==
Bommareddypally is a village surrounded by mountains and is a forest area (VSS). This village is 3 km away from SH 7 Karimnagar to Mancherial highwayroad.

The village population is greater than 2000 and equally balanced with different castes. The village has communities of Reddys, Padmashalis, Mudhiraj, Yadavs, SC and ST community. The villagers main occupation is agriculture. Main crops are cotton, maize, paddy.

The Village has a Govt Primary school, Anganwadi centre, health Centre and a post office. The village streets are covered with cement roads and street lights. The temples of this village are Nandi Mallanna Temple, Pochamma Temple, Hanuman Temple and Peddama Temple. The village is an example of a co-operative village.

The village is provided with pure drinking water and it consists of two ponds and tanks. There is no water crisis in this village till now. The climate is temperate. All the festivals like Vinayaka Chavithi, Dussera, Diwali, and Sankranthi are celebrated in a grand Way.

== Panchayats ==
The following is the list of village panchayats in Bommareddypally village. The village consists of 1400 voters.

2025 Sarpanch Elections Result in Bommareddypally

Name	Position	Duration
Dara Rajukumar Sarpanch 2025	Gagireddy venugopal Reddy MPTC	2019
