= GDK (disambiguation) =

GDK may refer to:

- GDK or GIMP Drawing Kit, a software library
- German Doner Kebab, a fast casual kebab chain
- gdk, the ISO 639-3 code for Gadang language
- Game development kit, specialized hardware and software used to create commercial video games for game consoles
- Greene County–Lewis A. Jackson Regional Airport, the FAA LID code GDK
- Gonda Kachahri railway station, the station code GDK
- 8th Incline Colony, a smart town in Telangana, India
