= Bogampadu =

Village in Karimnagar district, India

Coordinates: 18.064039°N 80.691338°E

Bogampadu is a small village in Jammikunta mandal, Karimnagar district, India.
