= Ushannapalli =

- Village
- Location in Telangana, India Ushannapalli (India)
- Coordinates: 18°29′46″N 79°29′52″E
- Country: India
- State: Telangana
- Time zone: UTC+5:30 (IST)

Ushannapalli is a village in Kalva Srirampur mandal, Karimnagar district of the state of Telangana, India.
