= Ramagundam Police Commissionerate =

- Common name: Ramagundam City Police
- Motto: Service Pride Dedication

Agency overview
- Formed: 11 October 2016
- Employees: Commissioner of Police; Deputy commissioner Additional Deputy Commissioners; Police Inspectors; Assistant Police Inspectors; Sub Inspectors

Jurisdictional structure
- Operations jurisdiction: Peddapalli and Mancherial districts, India
- Area: 8670 sq.km
- Population: About 16 lakhs
- Legal jurisdiction: Ramagundam Godavarikhani
- Primary governing body: Government of Telangana
- Secondary governing body: Telangana Police
- General nature: Local civilian police

Operational structure
- Headquarters: Ramagundam Police Commissionerate office, Police Head Quarters, opp: PTS 2nd Gate, NTPC, Godavarikhani, Telangana State. Pin : 505215. Ramagundam, Telangana, India
- Agency executive: Ambar Kishor Jha(IPS), Commissioner of Police
- Parent agency: Telangana Police

Facilities
- Stations: 44 police stations

Website
- http://ramagundampolice.in

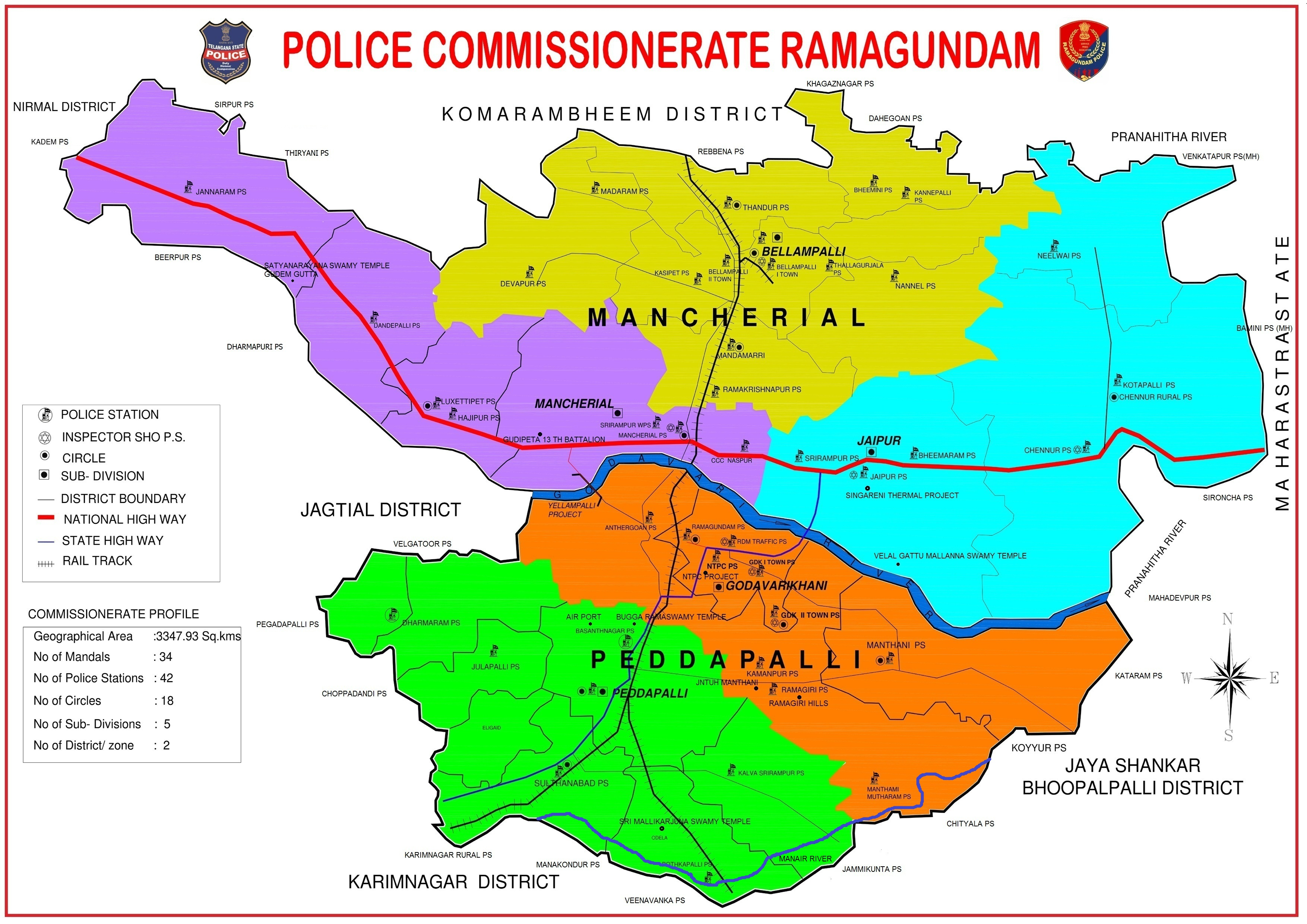
Ramagundam Police Commissionerate

Ramagundam Police Commissionerate is a city police force with primary responsibilities in law enforcement and investigation within Peddapalli, Mancherial city, Ramagundam city and Godavarikhani urban areas.

Ramagundam Police Commissionerate covers entire Peddapalli and Mancherial districts.

Present Commissioner of police is Mr Ambar Kishor Jha (IPS)
