= NTPC Ramagundam =

Coal-fired power plant in India

NTPC Ltd., Ramagundam
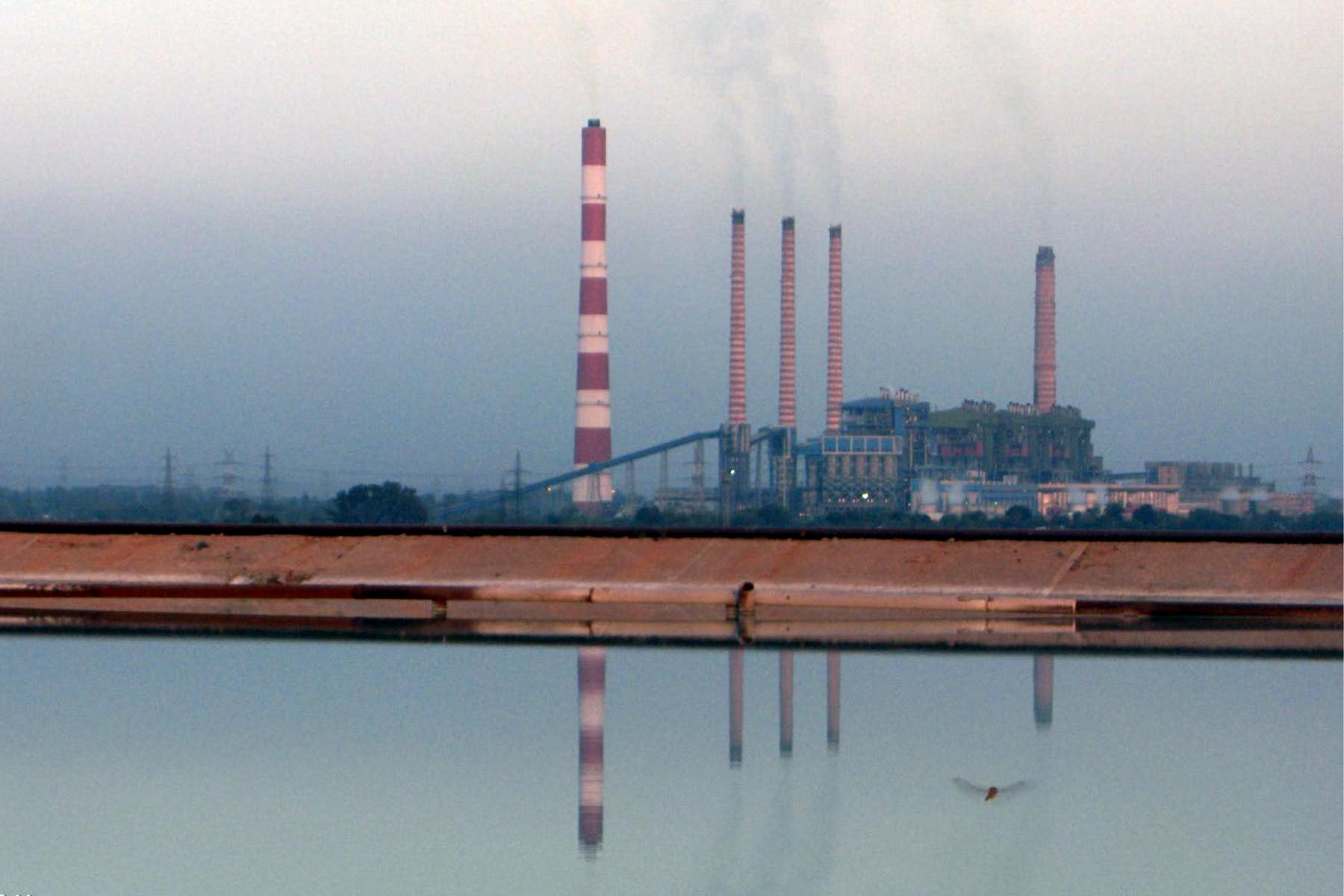
- Country: India
- Location: Ramagundam, Telangana
- Coordinates: 18°45′18″N 79°27′22″E
- Status: Operational
- Commission date: Unit 1 – November 1983; Unit 2 – May 1984; Unit 3 – December 1984; Unit 4 – June 1988; Unit 5 – March 1989; Unit 6 – October 1989; Unit 7 – August 2004
- Operator: NTPC Ltd.

Thermal power station
- Primary fuel: Coal
- Cooling source: Plain water (Sriram Sagar Project)

Power generation
- Units operational: 3 × 200 MW; 4 × 500 MW
- Nameplate capacity: 2600 MW
- Annual net output: 21,594.653 MU

External links
- Website: www.ntpc.co.in/power-generation/coal-based-power-stations/ramagundam
- Commons: Related media on Commons

NTPC Ramagundam, a part of National Thermal Power Corporation, is a 2,600 megawatt (MW) Super thermal power station situated at Ramagundam in Peddapalli district in Telangana, India. It is the current largest power station in South India. It is the first ISO 14001 certified "Super Thermal Power Station" in India.

== The TG Hall ==
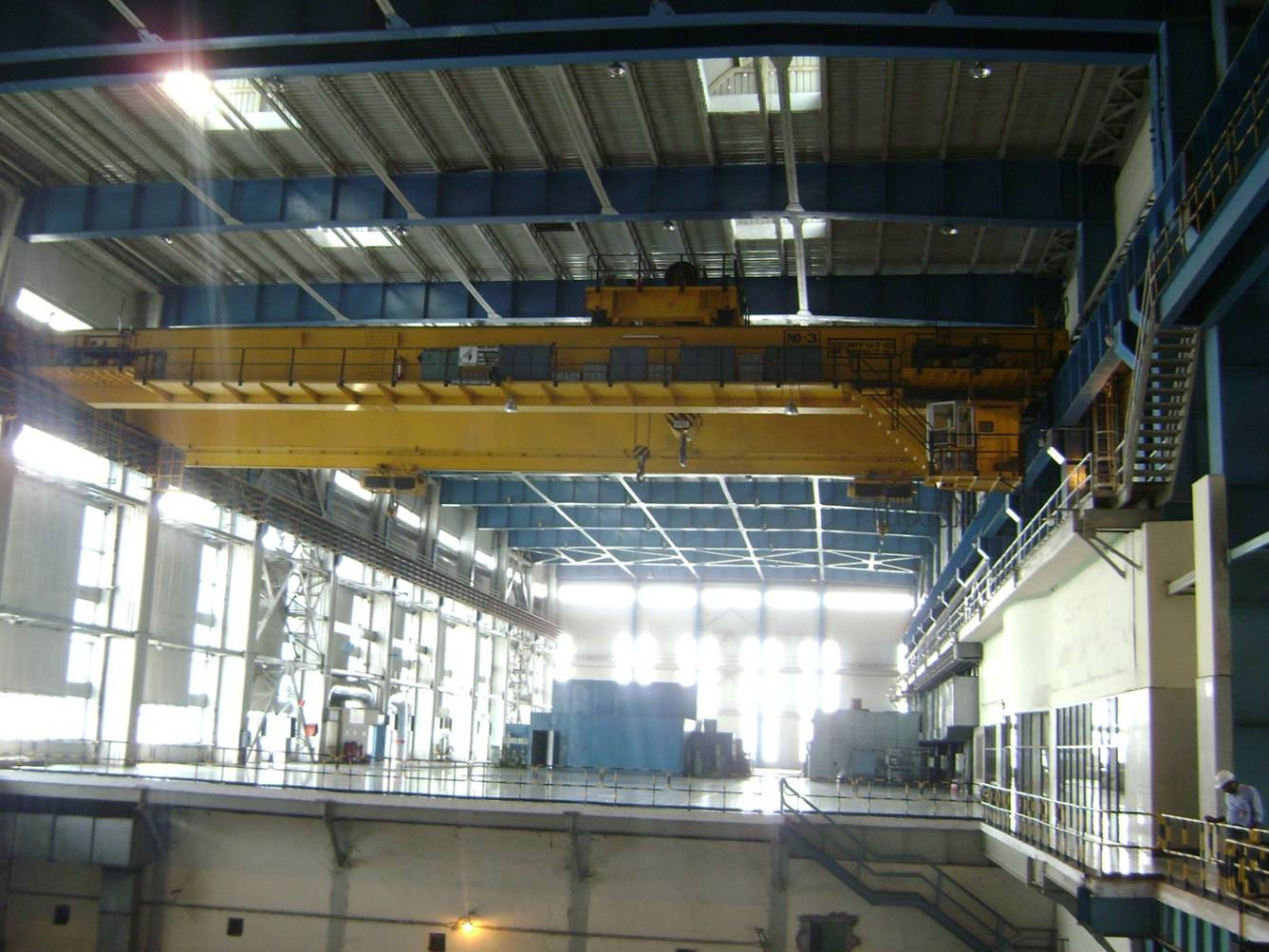
Turbo-Generator Hall, UNIT#7, NTPC Ltd., Ramagundam

The TG Hall or the Turbo-Generator hall or the Turbine-Generator Hall is the hall or space where the turbine-generator sets are present.

NTPC Ltd., Ramagundam has two TG Halls one for STAGE-I and the other common for STAGE-II and STAGE-III. These TG halls are equipped with heavy overhead cranes that assist in transportation of material within the TG hall. These cranes find their use greatly during overhauls.

== Unit-wise power generation ==
The whole plant is divided into 3 stages, each stage being planned at one time.

=== STAGE 1 (3×200 MW) ===
This stage consists of three units (Unit-1, Unit-2, Unit-3) each with a generation capacity of 200 MW. The turbines for these three units were manufactured by The Ansaldo Energia Ltd. The construction began in the late 1970s and these units have performed well over a long period, setting many records regarding maintenance and generation over the other two stages. But stage (1, 2, 3) cwp motors are manufactured by BHEL and all motors are manufactured by Ansaldo. S-I coal mill motors are 240 KW and PA fans are 400 KW.

The first phase of the project, a 800 MW unit, was inaugurated by Prime Minister Narendra Modi on 3 October 2023.

=== STAGE 2 (3×500 MW) ===
This stage also consists of three units (Unit-4, Unit-5, Unit-6) each with a generation capacity of 500 MW. The turbines for these three units were manufactured by Bharat Heavy Electricals Limited (BHEL).

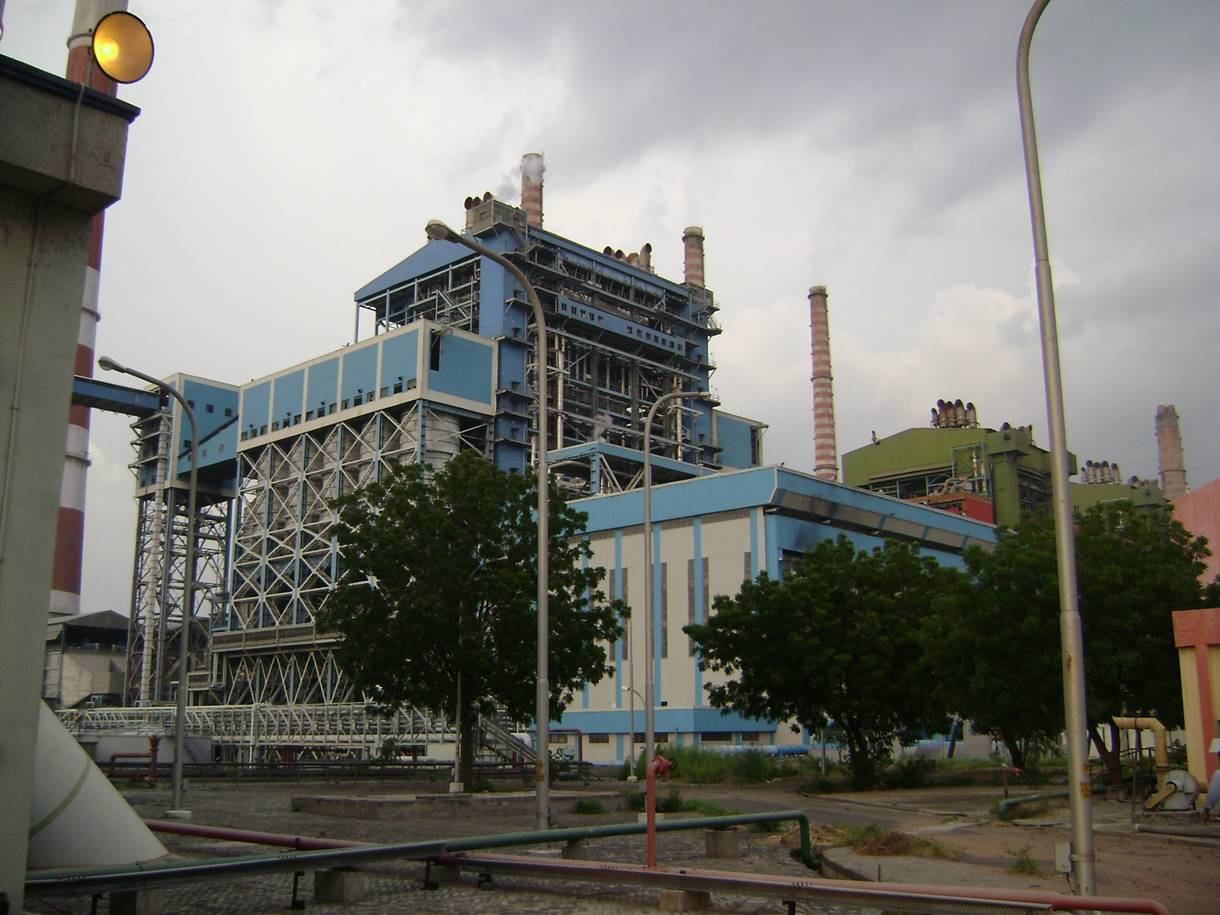
Outside view of STAGE-III (Unit#7)

=== Stage 3 (1×500 MW) ===
This stage comprises only one unit (Unit-7). It is a first of its kind in South India, being a computer operated unit. A wide disparity may be seen between the control rooms of the other two stages and this computerised unit. Many Power plant engineers train in this unit to upgrade themselves to this new mode of operation.

== Overhauls ==
Once every two years, these units are stopped and overhauled, one unit at a time. The overhauls are usually taken up from June to September as the monsoons increase hydropower generation which substitutes for the power generation lost due to the overhaul of the unit. The same practice is followed throughout the country. The overhauls usually take 15 to 20 days per unit provided there is no major repair involved. Major repairs include turbine casing, turbine rotor damage and other damages that require transporting the equipment to another location (usually the manufacturer). The overhauls are the dissipators of the annual PLF of any power plant.

== Generation distribution ==
=== States ===
As NTPC Ltd. is a Public Sector Undertaking (PSU), the generation is almost uniformly distributed to 5–6 states, all of which share about 20–25% of the output. These States include:

- Andhra Pradesh
- Telangana
- Tamil Nadu
- Kerala
- Karnataka
- Maharashtra

=== Electrical substation ===
The substation is the place where the station last interacts with the power it produces. The switchyard links the power generated to the southern power grid. The major transmission points are:

- Nagarjunasagar
- Chandrapur
- Hyderabad
- Khammam

== Inputs ==
=== Water ===
The power station is provided water periodically by the Sriram Sagar Project (SRSP). This water is stored in the balance reservoir. The water level in the balance reservoir is monitored daily.

=== Coal ===
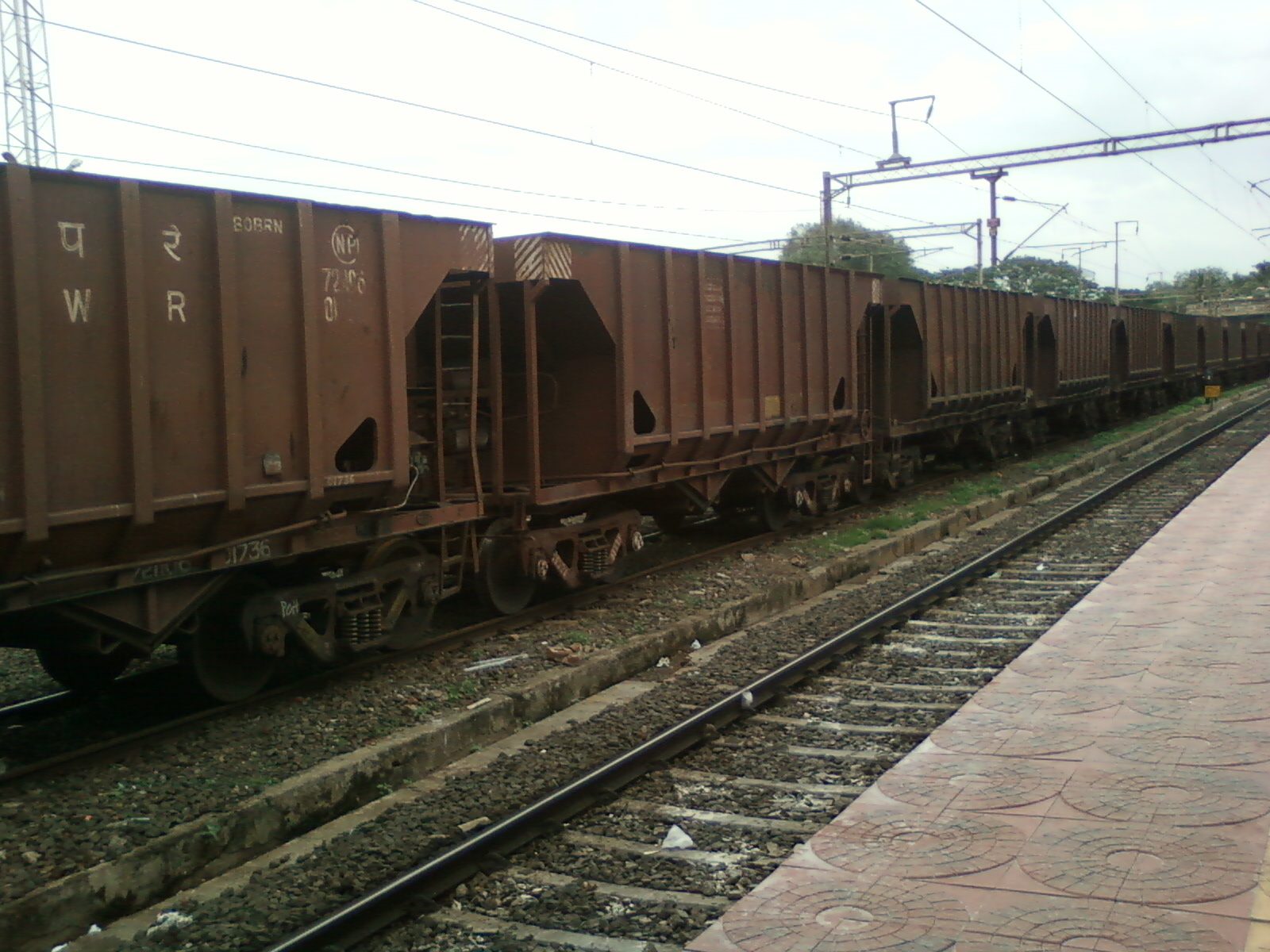
BOBRN class hopper cars freight rakes used by Indian Railways

NTPC Ramagundam is a Coal-fired power station. This coal is available at a large scale from the Singareni Coal mining company nearby and is transported using the MGR (Merry-go-round) system, wherein a train travels on one rail route, delivers coal and returns on another route. The hopper wagons arriving by this route are taken for coal collection where a mechanism provided underneath the wagons opens on application of air pressure and drops the coal it is carrying. A separate department (MGR Dept.) handles this process.

Coal also arrives by the Indian Railways. The open wagons are routed via Ramagundam railway station to the separate plant line and these wagons arrive at the wagon tippler. The wagons arriving in this manner must be tilted at the wagon tippler to unload the coal as they do not have the drop mechanism underneath.

=== Other petroleum products required ===
The station also requires various oils for the following purposes:

- Turbine oil (SP-46) for turbine lubrication
- Heavy fuel oil (HFO) for boiler start-up
- Diesel for DG sets (Power backup)
- Other oils for various hydraulic controls and circuits

These are periodically purchased as per requirement from the Indian oil corporation IOCL establishment nearby.

== Departments ==
The plant classifies its departments as O&M (operation and maintenance) and Non-O&M.

=== Departments under O&M ===
==== Operation ====
The operation department has the greatest number of employees. It manages the operation of the various equipment and controls in the plant. The operation department takes care of the unit control rooms (UCBs). Since the plant operates nonstop, the operation department works in shifts to take care of the units at all times.

==== Electrical Maintenance ====
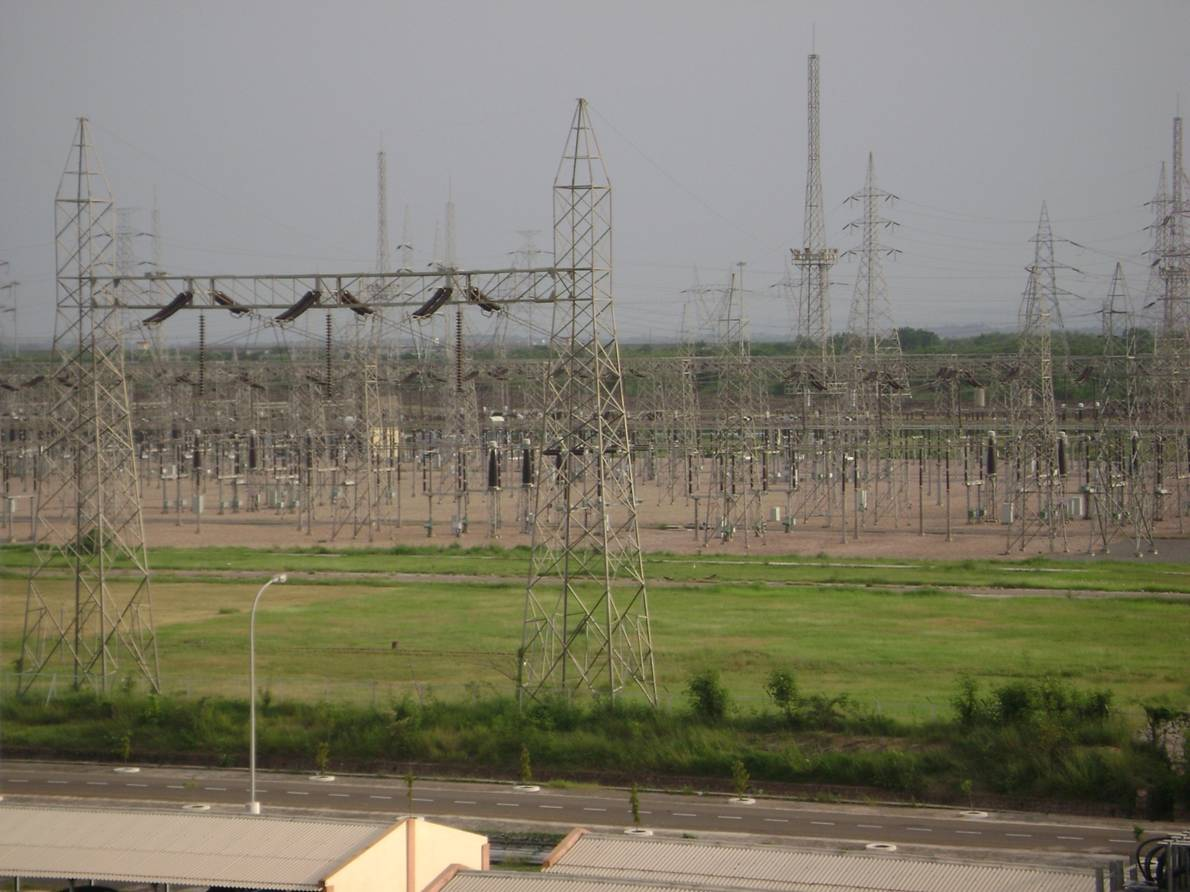
Switchyard of NTPC Ltd., Ramagundam

This is the largest department under the Maintenance section. This department takes care of all the electrical aspects of the plant. It takes care of the following sections:

- Switchyard
- Generator
- Generator transformer
- Conveyor motors and other motors
- All power transmissions

==== Civil Maintenance ====
Civil Maintenance takes care of all the civil activities in the plant such as non-mechanical constructions, maintenance of locations, scrap removal and ensuring a proper working condition of minor equipment.

==== MGR (Merry-go-Round) Department ====
This department takes care of the coal transport to the plant.

==== CHP (Coal Handling Plant) ====
This department takes care of all coal handling processes.

- Coal collection
- Coal storage
- Coal crushing
- Coal convey system
- Subsequent milling

==== Mechanical Maintenance ====
This department has the following sections:

===== Boiler Maintenance =====
- Boiler feeders
- Primary and secondary air pumps
- Boiler feed pumps
- Boiler core parts

===== Turbine Maintenance =====
- Turbine core parts
- Turbine governing system

=== Control & Instrumentation ===
This department deals with the maintenance of various control devices and instruments. It is considered to be a part of the maintenance section. It has got the following sections.

- Boiler C&I
- Turbine C&I

=== Departments under non-O&M ===
- HR
- Finance
- Materials and contracts
- IT

== Staff ==
The plant is headed by the Executive Director (ED) to whom the General Managers (GMs) report. The O&M group is headed by the Chief of General Managers (O&M) again to whom the GMs of concerned departments report.

== Township ==
The temporary township (TTS) was constructed during the early stages of the plant. Secondary employees of the organisation (Note: Secondary employees include: contractors, allied organisation employees, and employees of service organisations to the township, such as Dooradarshan Aliautomobiles.) now reside there.

The permanent township (PTS) is where most of the employees reside with their families. It is known for its serenity, cleanliness, vegetation and parks.

=== Schools ===
The township has three schools. St. Claire High school, Kendriya Vidyalaya NTPC Ramagundam and the Sachdeva school of excellence (formerly Chinmaya Vidyalaya).

=== Shopping ===
The township has a main shopping centre and four small shopping centres where the residents may shop for groceries and other regular needs.

=== Facilities ===
The township is well facilitated with banking (The State Bank of India with an on-site ATM), postal services, telephone and internet services (BSNL), adequate water supply, 24/7 electricity from the plant, civil services and its own security.

TSRTC-Godavarikhani bus depot runs city and long distance buses from the NTPC bus stop to Ramagundam railway station and various local areas.

=== Guest Houses and Restaurants ===
There are two guest houses: "Jyothi bhavan" for executives and "Godavari Bhavan" (Field Hostel) for other employees, students and trainees. There is the Satavahana Restaurant for families. These are maintained by the Indian Coffee House employees and are equipped with dining facilities thus forming as restaurants for the township residents.

=== Parks ===
The township has various parks, namely the Ambedkar park, the Chacha Nehru park, the Priyadarshini park, amongst others.
