= Ramagundam Airport =

- IATA: RMD; ICAO: VORG

Summary
- Airport type: Public
- Operator: Airports Authority of India
- Serves: Peddapalli, Jagityal, Karimnagar, Mancherial Districts of Telangana state, India
- Location: Basant Nagar, Ramagundam
- Elevation AMSL: 46 m / 151 ft
- Coordinates: 18°42′02″N 079°23′30″E

Map

Runways
Direction	Length		Surface
Direction	m	ft	Surface
11L/29R	1,300	4,265	Unpaved
- Sources: GCM, STV

Ramagundam Airport (IATA: RMD, ICAO: VORG) is a proposed airport located at Kesoram Cement Factory in Basanth Nagar serving the city of Ramagundam, in the Indian state of Telangana. The existing airstrip was served by Vayudoot in the 1980s until the airline was shut down. Currently, the Telangana State Government intends to further develop the airport.

== History ==
The airstrip spread over 294 acres (1.19 km^{2}) at Kesoram Cement Factory was originally used by the founders of the factory. In the 1980s, Vayudoot used to serve the airport.

In 2008, the Government of undivided Andhra Pradesh invited expressions of interest to develop eight minor airports in the state, including an airport at the existing Ramagundam airstrip. Each airport was expected to cost ₹50 crore (equivalent to ₹139 crore or US$15 million in 2023). The airports were to be built in 500–600 acres (2.0–2.4 km^{2}). The construction of this airport was chosen because Ramagundam has an industrial potential with one of the largest thermal power plants run by NTPC.

In July 2009, the government scrapped the plans as no companies posted bids for the construction of the airport. The companies believed the construction to be infeasible due to low expectations of revenues. In October 2009, the government has planned to invite fresh bids for 4 airports including Ramagundam airport, to be constructed in 500 acres (2.0 km^{2}). The government has offered additional incentives including exemption from value added taxes and waiver of lease rentals for the first seven years once the airport is operational.

In August 2020, Airports Authority of India (AAI) has sought details about six proposed airports including this airport in the state of Telangana. AAI would be conducting a survey for the feasibility of constructing these airports, both infrastructure-wise and in terms of commercial returns.
