= Odela =

Coordinates: 18°27′12″N 79°26′49″E

- Village
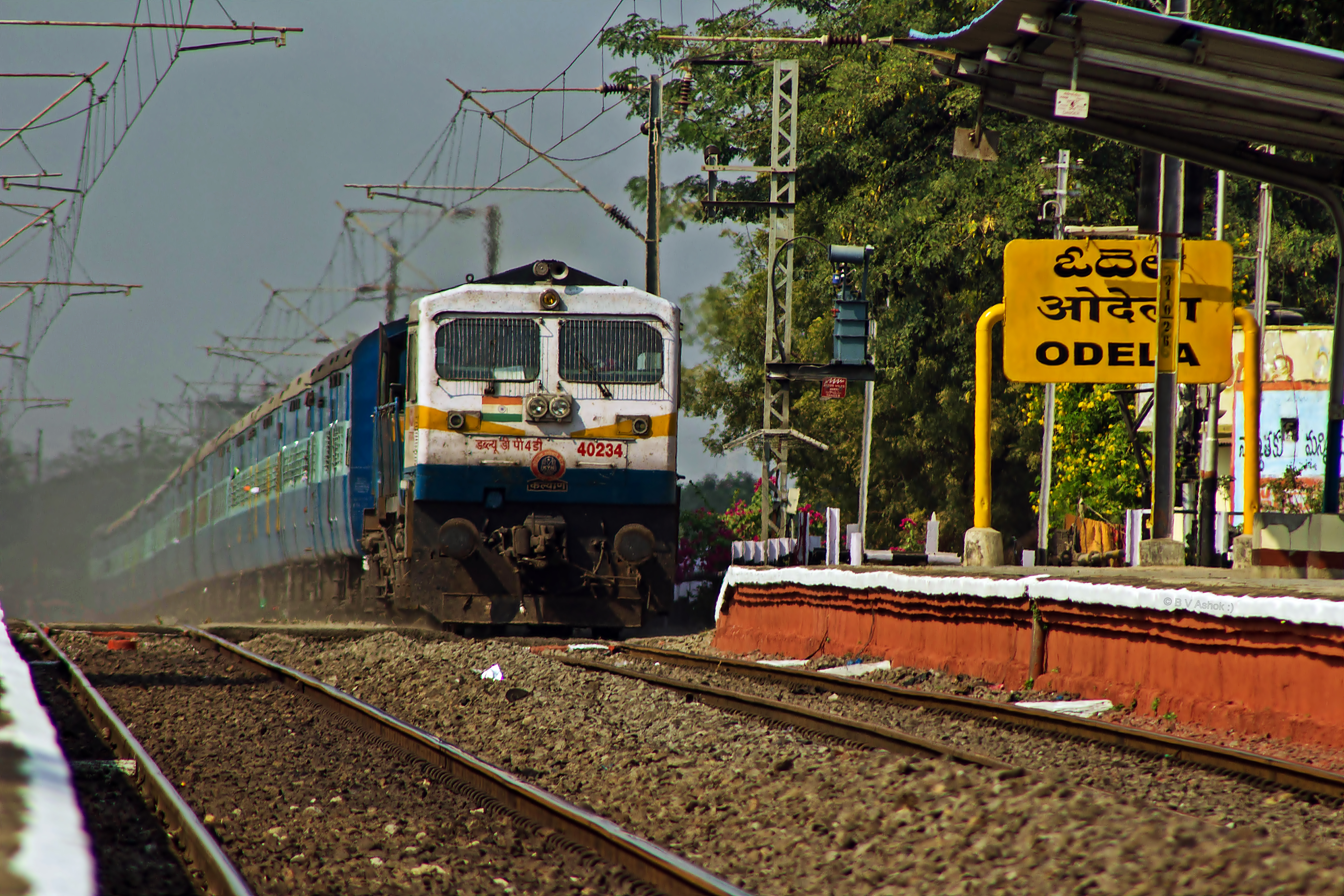
- A train passing through Odela railway station.

- Location in Telangana, India Odela (India)
- Country: India
- State: Telangana
- District: Peddapalli

Population (2011)
  - Total: est(10,000)

Languages
  - Official: Telugu
- Time zone: UTC+5:30 (IST)
- 505152: 505152

Odela is a village in Odela mandal of Peddapalli district of the Indian state of Telangana.

== History ==
Once upon a time in a dense forest a sage called Sri Pankaj Maha Muni lived and he used to offer prayers to the Shiva Lingam every night. There are inscriptions on the temple pillar which substantiates the story. As the time rolled by, the sage died and the Shiva Lingam that he worshipped was covered under the nests of ants. Some years later, a farmer by name Chinthakunta Odelu was tilling his land. His plough suddenly struck the Shivalingam. He took it out and constructed a temple around it. People of this village are mostly farmers, mainly cultivating paddy, corn and cotton.

== Temple ==
- Sri Mallikarjuna Swamy temple of Lord Shiva
- Lord Sri Rama temple
- Sri Bramarambha Mata
- Veera Shaiva Mattam temple

== Transport ==
The village is connected by rail and road. The village falls on the train route between Delhi and Chennai between the Kazipet and Balarshah divisions of Indian Railway. Daily there are three trips of government Bus which connects it to nearby small town Sultanabad, which falls on the state highway No 1 connecting the state capital Hyderabad, Ramagundam, known as Rajiv Rahadhari and The nearest international airport is at Hyderabad, which is about 236 km.

== Popular culture ==
A Telugu thriller film, directed by Ashok Teja, Odela Railway Station was released in 2022 based on true event. Odela 2 was released on 17 April 2025 as a sequel to Odela Railway Station.
