= Brahmanpalli =

- Village
- Nicknames: Brahmanapalli, Brahmanapalle(Ps)
- Location in Peddapalli District, Telangana, India
- Coordinates: 18.671073°N 79.385443°E
- Country: India
- State: Telangana
- District: Peddapalli
- Mandal: Peddapalli

Government
  - Body: Gram panchayat
  - Village Secretary: Manga
  - Sarpanch: Gandla Mallesham
  - Ward Members: To be updated...
  - Co-Option Members: To be updated...

Area
  - Total: 2.85 km^{2} (1.10 sq mi)

Population (2011)
  - Total: 1,909
  - Density: 670/km^{2} (1,730/sq mi)

Languages
  - Official: Telugu
- Time zone: UTC+5:30 (IST)
- PIN: 505174
- Vehicle registration: TS 22
- Website: telangana.gov.in

Brahmanpalli is a village in Peddapalli mandal of Peddapalli district in the state of Telangana in India. Brahmanapalli has a population of 1,909 within its village limits, according to the 2011 census. It is located about 6 km (3.7 mi) from Peddapalli.
