= Julapalle =

Coordinates: 18°37′20″N 79°15′12″E

Julapally
- Village
- Interactive map of Julapally
- Country: India
- State: Telangana
- District: Peddapalle
- Talukas: Julapalle

Languages
  - Official: Telugu
- Time zone: UTC+5:30 (IST)
- PIN: 505525
- Telephone code: 08542
- Vehicle registration: TS-22
- Website: telangana.gov.in

Julapalle or Julapalli or Julapally is a village Julapalli mandal of Peddapalli district in the state of Telangana in India.
