= State Highway 11 (Telangana) =

Road in Telangana, India

State Highway 11
- Map of State Highway 11 Telangana

Route information
- Length: 137 km (85 mi)
- Existed: 1980s–present

Major junctions
- From: Karimnagar
- To: Kamareddy

Location
- Country: India
- State: Telangana
- Primary destinations: Karimnagar, Sircilla

Highway system
- Roads in India; Expressways; National; State; Asian; State Highways in Telangana
| → SH 2 |

SH-11 is an express road in Northern Telangana, India. The highway begins at Karimnagar, where it links with State Highway 1 and joins National Highway 765D in Yellareddy. Passing through key northern towns along the way such as Kamareddy and Vemulawada, Rajana Sircilla District.

== History ==
The route was developed in a piecemeal manner during the 1980s. It is part of a proposal to be developed as a National Highway.

== See also ==
- List of state highways in Telangana
