= Mutharam mandal =

Mutharam
- Mandal
- Location in Telangana, India Mutharam (India)
- Coordinates: 18°30′49″N 79°37′26″E
- Country: India
- State: Telangana
- District: Peddapalli

Languages
  - Official: Telugu
- Time zone: UTC+5:30 (IST)
- PIN: 505184
- Vehicle registration: TS
- Nearest city: Manthani
- Lok Sabha constituency: Peddapalli
- Vidhan Sabha constituency: Manthani

Mutharam mandal (or Muthani mandal) is situated in Peddapalli district of Telangana state of India.

== Villages ==
Mutharam mandal has the following villages:

- Adavisrirampur
- Dharyapur
- Ippalapalli
- Keshanapalli
- Khammampalli
- Lakkaram
- Machupeta
- Mutharam
- Mydambanda
- Odedu
- Parupalli
- Potharam
- Sarvaram
- Shatharajpalli
- Sukravarampeta
