= Cheemalapeta =

Village in Telangana, India

Cheemalapeta is a village in Peddapalle mandal, Peddapalli district, Telangana, India.
