= Sultanabad, Peddapalli district =

Sultanabad
- Town
- Location in Telangana, India Sultanabad (India)
- Coordinates: 18°31′40.007″N 79°19′14.338″E
- Country: India
- State: Telangana
- District: Peddapalli
- Talukas: Sulthanabad
- Elevation: 238 m (781 ft)

Population
  - Total: 16,000

Languages
  - Official: Telugu, Urdu
- Time zone: UTC+5:30 (IST)
- PIN: 505 185
- Vehicle registration: TS-22
- Website: telangana.gov.in

Sultanabad is a town in Sultanabad mandal of Peddapalli district in the state of Telangana, India. It was earlier known as Osmannagar.

== Geography ==
Sultanabad is located at 18.5333°N 79.3333°E. It has an average elevation of 238 metres (781 ft) above mean sea level.

== Transport ==
State Highway 1 passes through this town.

=== Rail ===
Sultanabad has a railway station and is part of the Peddapalli-Nizamabad line.
