= Godavarikhani =

- City
- Location in Ramagundam, Telangana, India Godavarikhani (India)
- Coordinates: 18.7519°N 79.5133°E
- Country: India
- Deccan State: Telangana
- District: Peddapalli
- Named for: River Godavari and coal mines

Government
  - Type: Democratic
  - Body: Ramagundam Municipal Corporation
  - Rank: 6

Population (2011)
  - Total: 229,644
  - Rank: 6
- Demonym: Godavarikhanite

Languages
  - Official: Telugu, English
- Time zone: UTC+5:30 (IST)
- PIN: 505209,505210,505214,505215,505211
- Telephone STD code: 08728
- Vehicle registration: TS22
- Website: https://ramagundamcorporation.telangana.gov.in/

Godavarikhani is a coal-mining town in Peddapalli district in the Indian state of Telangana, within the Ramagundam Municipal Corporation. Its name was coined by Geetla Janardhan Reddy, a former member of the Legislative Council, and refers to the Godavari River and the area's mines. Singareni Collieries Company Limited operates coal mines in the surrounding mining area.

The Ramagundam Police Commissionerate is headquartered in Godavarikhani and has jurisdiction over Peddapalli and Mancherial districts. The town is served by TSRTC bus services and by Ramagundam railway station on the New Delhi–Chennai main line, while State Highway 1 provides road connections towards Hyderabad and Karimnagar.

== Name ==
The name Godavarikhani was coined by Geetla Janardhan Reddy, a former member of the Legislative Council. It refers to the Godavari River and to the area's mines and mineral resources, reflecting the importance of coal mining to the locality.

== Geography and economy ==
Godavarikhani forms part of the area administered by the Ramagundam Municipal Corporation, which also includes Ramagundam and the NTPC area of Jyothi Nagar. Godavarikhani is a coal-mining area, with several open-cast mines operated by the Singareni Collieries Company Limited.

== Demographics ==
As per reports of Census of India, population of Godavarikhani in 2011 was 229,644; of which male and female were 116,748 and 112,896 respectively. Although Godavarikhani city had a population of 229,644; its urban / metropolitan population was 252,308 of which 128,239 were males and 124,069 were females.

Hinduism is the majority religion in Godavarikhani city with 88.60% followers. Islam is the second most popular religion with approximately 9.68% following it. Christianity is followed by 1.22%, Jainism by 0.01%, Sikhism by 0.09% and Buddhism by 0.09%. Approximately 0.39% stated 'other Religion'.

== Education ==
Godavarikhani is an education center in Peddapalli District, Telangana, and has produced many renowned intellectuals, lawyers, politicians, poets, and technologists over several decades. Many software students, born, and educated in Godavarikhani, have migrated to major metropolitan areas in India and across the globe.

There are many schools and intermediate colleges in the city. Godavarikhani has Technology institutes, Polytechnic college, Degree & Post Graduated colleges and the CBSE School, Kendriya Vidyalaya, NTPC Ramagundam.

== Government and politics ==
=== Law and order ===
Ramagundam Police Commissionerate is a city police force headquartered at Godavarikhani with primary responsibilities in law enforcement and investigation within Peddapalli and Mancherial districts.

=== Politics ===
Makkan Singh Raj Thakur (born 1971), is an Indian politician from Telangana state, who represents Indian National Congress, won as MLA in the 2023 Telangana Legislative Assembly Elections from Ramagundam Assembly constituency. He polled 92,227 votes and defeated his nearest rival, former MLA Korukanti Chandar Patel of Bharat Rashtra Samithi, by a huge margin of 56,794 votes. Somarapu Satyanarayana, who won as MLA in the 2014 elections from Ramagundam constituency, has been appointed as Telangana's first TSRTC Public Transport Chairman in 2016.

== Transport ==
=== Air ===
Ramagundam Airport is old airport and government is planning to reopen this runway and develop as brownfield airport due to its access and proximity in between 4 districts and to make it connected to major cities.

=== Bus ===
Godavarikhani (GDK) (Black diamond) bus depot of TSRTC ply buses to surrounding villages as well as interstate destinations. There is direct connectivity of Four Lane Express Highway road from Hyderabad – Karimnagar – Ramagundam Highway which is called Rajeev Rahadari (State Highway 1 (Telangana)). There is direct connectivity Garuda plus Volvo to Bengaluru by TSRTC and other private operators.

=== Rail ===
Ramagundam railway station provides rail connectivity and its B category station and on Chennai central to New Delhi main railway line which is also a potential stoppage in terms of revenue and passengers. Ramagundam has direct connectivity to almost all major cities and towns of India like Mumbai, Delhi, Chennai, Varanasi, Hyderabad, Bengaluru, Kochi, Visakhapatnam, Vijayawada, Ahmedabad, Surat, Jaipur, Jammu, Mangalore, Gauhati, Trivandrum Central, Kanyakumari, Pune, Patna, Bhubaneshwar, Shri Mata Vaishno Devi Katra, etc.

== See also ==
- List of cities in Telangana by population
- List of cities in Telangana by area
