= Ramagundam Municipal Corporation =

Local civic body in Ramagundam, Telangana, India

Type
- Type: Municipal Corporation of the Ramagundam

Leadership
- Mayor: Mahankali Swamy, INC
- Deputy Mayor: Patipelli Ellayya, INC
- Municipal Commissioner: P. Uday Kumar

Structure
- Seats: 60
- Political groups: Government (38): INC (38); Opposition (22): BRS (13); AIFB (6); BJP (1); CPI (1)

Elections
- Last election: 2026

Website
- Ramagundam Municipal Corporation

The Ramagundam Municipal Corporation is the local governing body, administering the city of Ramagundam, Peddapalli district in the Indian state of Telangana.

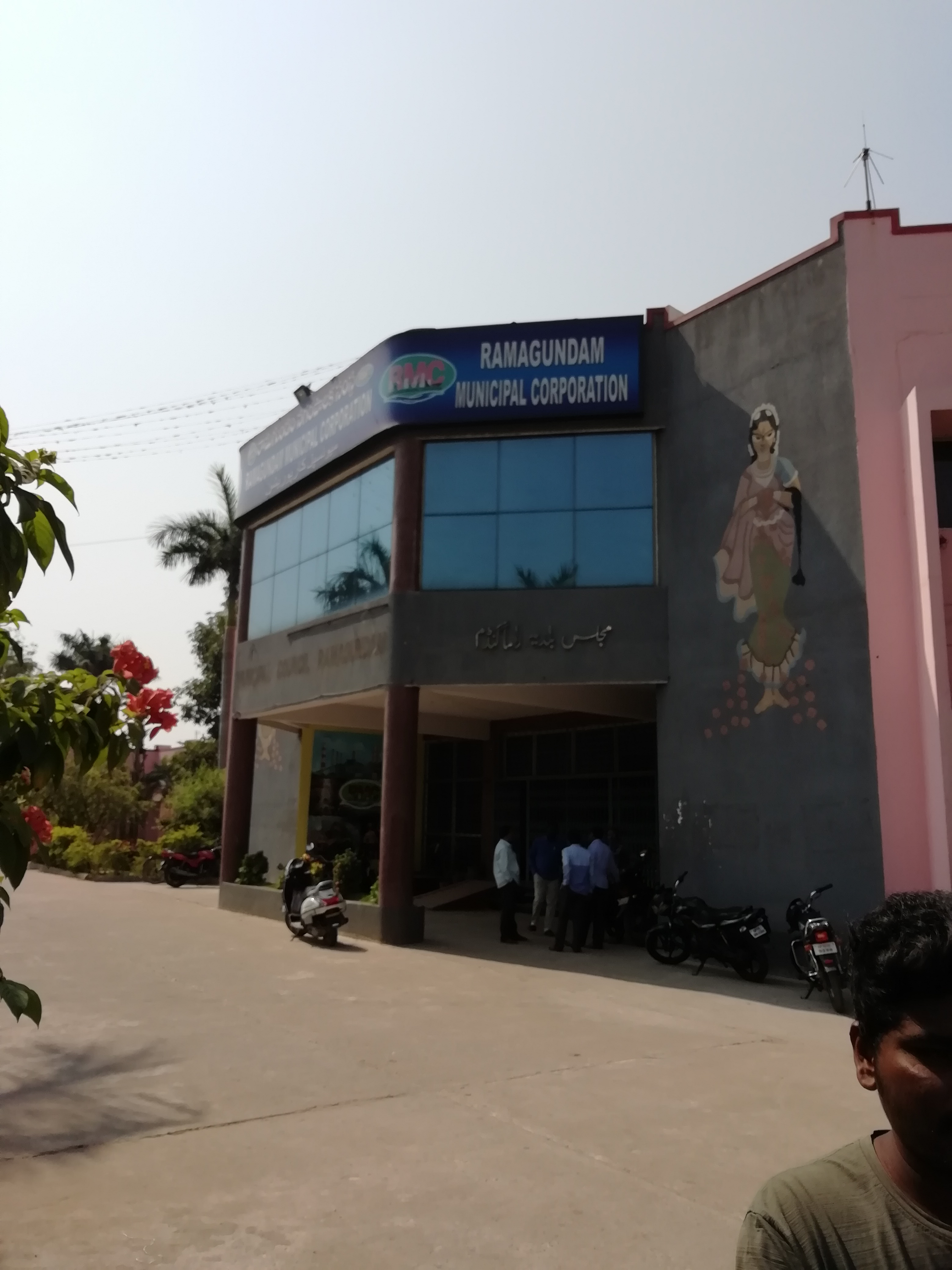
Ramagundam Municipal Corporation

As of 2011 census, the municipal corporation had a population of 229,644.

The municipal corporation consists of democratically elected members, is headed by a mayor and administers the city's governance, infrastructure and administration. This city is selected under central government scheme of AMRUT.
