= Dharmaram, Peddapalli district =

Dharmaram
- Census Town
- Location in Telangana, India Dharmaram (India)
- Coordinates: 18°44′2.924″N 79°11′29.049″E
- Country: India
- State: Telangana
- District: Peddapalli

Area
  - Total: 3.78 km^{2} (1.46 sq mi)

Population (2011)
  - Total: 11,537
  - Density: 3,050/km^{2} (7,900/sq mi)

Languages
  - Official: Telugu
- Time zone: UTC+5:30 (IST)
- PIN: 505416
- Vehicle registration: TS–22
- Website: telangana.gov.in

Dharmaram is a town in Dharmaram mandal of Peddapalli district in the Indian state of Telangana.
