= Peddapalli =

- Town & District Headquarter
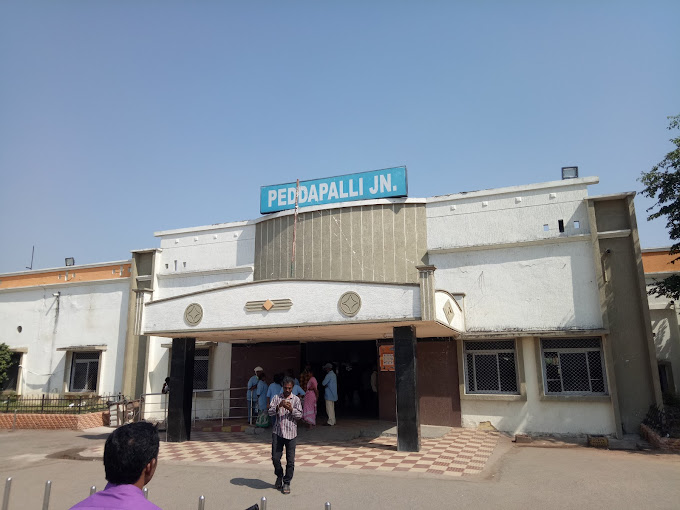
- Nickname: Singareni District
- Location in Telangana, India Peddapalli (India)
- Coordinates: 18.6162°N 79.3832°E
- Country: India
- State: Telangana
- District: Peddapalli
- Founder: Nizam

Government
  - Type: Telangana Legislative Assembly
  - Body: Municipal Council Peddapalli
  - Municipal Chairman: Dr. Chittireddy MamathaReddy (T.R.S)
  - MLA: Sri Chintakunta Vijaya Ramana Rao
  - MP: Vamsi Krishna Gaddam (Indian National Congress)
  - Commissioner of Police: M.Srinivasulu IPS (IG)(Ramagundam Police Commissionerate)

Area
  - Total: 26.19 km^{2} (10.11 sq mi)
- Elevation: 508 m (1,667 ft)

Population (2011)
  - Total: 56,000
  - Density: 2,100/km^{2} (5,500/sq mi)

Languages
  - Official: Telugu, Urdu
- Time zone: UTC+5:30 (IST)
- Vehicle registration: TS-22
- Website: peddapalle.telangana.gov.in

Peddapalli is a town and Revenue division in Peddapalli district in the Indian state of Telangana. It is the headquarters of the Peddapalli District and Peddapalli mandal. It is located about 197 kilometres (122 mi) North of the state capital Hyderabad, 36 kilometres (22 mi) from Karimnagar, 28 kilometres (17 mi) from Ramagundam. Peddapalli has a railway junction named PDPL which connects PDPL - KRMR - NZB railway line and New Delhi (NDLS) - Chennai Central (MAS) railway line. There are two trains that terminate here. Karimnagar Tirupati express rail engine changes to electric engine here. In future there’s a proposal to develop a bypass railway station named Peddapalli Town which directly connects Kazipet-Karimnagar without entering peddapalli junction station.As of 2024 census of India, Peddapalli has a population of 56000. In 2016 due to population Increase, the civic body of Peddapalli was upgraded from Nagar Panchayat to Municipal council Post upgradation to Council.

== Geography ==
Peddapalli is located at 18.6162°N 79.3832°E and at an altitude of 508 m (1,667 ft). The town is spread over an area of 10.36 km^{2} (4.00 sq mi).

== Transport ==
=== Road ===
Peddapalli is well connected with Hyderabad - Karimnagar - Ramagundam (HKR) highway which is also called as Rajeev Rahadari or Telangana State Highway No.1. Peddapalli has TGSRTC bus depot but Godavarikhani (GDK), Manthani (MNTY) & Karimnagar (KRMR-2) bus depots operate dedicated services to the surrounding villages and other major cities.

=== Rail ===
Railway Station Code: PDPL

Peddapalli has a railway station which is called as Peddapalli Railway Junction. It is operated by the Secunderabad Railway Division of South Central Railway (SCR). The station is located in the main line which connects Delhi-Chennai railway line. As a junction, it serves for Peddapalli-Nizamabad railway line. Peddapalli -kachiguda demu express and peddapalli - Karimnagar - Nizamabad demu passengers start from here.

=== Air ===
Airport Code IATA: RMD, ICAO: VORG

There is an Airstrip with 1,300 m runway which is located at Kesoram Cement Factory, BasanthNagar, Ramagundam. It is owned by the Birla Family and was operated by the Airports Authority of India. After the closure of Vayudoot it has not been of regular use. Now it is an unusual airstrip. The Government of Telangana is planning to develop this airport as a part of third airport in the state of Telangana by 2022 and it serves for four districts i.e. Peddapalli, Mancherial, Karimnagar and Jagtial.

== Educational institutions ==
There are many Educational Institutions in Peddapalli. It has Schools, Intermediate Colleges, Industrial Training Institutes, Engineering & Technology institutes, Degree & Post Graduation Colleges, etc.

=== Government Institutions ===
==== Schools ====
- Zilla Parishad High School for Girls
- Zilla Parishad High School for Boys

==== Junior Colleges ====
- Government Junior College for Boys
- Government Junior College for Girls

==== Degree and Post Graduation Colleges ====
- Government Degree and Post Graduation College

==== Industrial Training Institutes ====
- Government Industrial Training Institute

=== Private Institutions ===
==== Schools ====
- Pallavi Model School
- Smart Kidz Paatashala
- Geetanjali Public School
- Indian Mission High School
- Krishnaveni Talent School
- St. Ann's High School, Peddapalli
- Crescent High School
- Trinity Primary School
- Trinity Secondary School

==== Junior Colleges ====
- Vikas Junior College
- Gayatri Junior College
- Trinity Junior College
- Shreya Vocational Junior College
- Sri Chaitanya Vocational Junior College

==== Degree and Post Graduation Colleges ====
- Trinity Degree College
- Gayatri Degree and Post Graduation College

==== Engineering and Technology Colleges ====
- Trinity College Of Engineering and Technology
- Mother Teresa College Of Engineering and Technology

==== Industrial Training Institutes ====
- Sindhura Industrial Training Institute
- Shiva Sai Industrial Training Institute
- Kakatiya Industrial Training Institute

==== Other Colleges ====
- Trinity College Of Teacher Education
- Trinity College Of Pharmaceutical Sciences
- Sahaja School Of Business

== Government and politics ==
Peddapalli Nagar Panchayat was constituted in 2011 with 20 election wards. It became the Municipality (Municipal Council Peddapalli) in 2016 due to the population increase & is constituted with the 36 wards in it. The jurisdiction of the civic body is spread over an area of 26.19 km^{2} (10.11 mi^{2}).

== Villages in Peddapalli Mandal ==
1. Andugulapalli
2. Appannapet
3. Bandhampalli
4. Bojannapet
5. Bompally
6. Brahmanpalli
7. Chandapalli
8. Cheekurai
9. Cheemalapeta
10. Goureddipet
11. Gurrampalli
12. Julapally
13. Kanagarthi
14. Eligaid
15. Kasulapalli
16. Kotthapalli
17. Maredugonda
18. Mulasala
19. Mutharam
20. Nittoor
21. Palthem
22. Peddabonkur
23. Peddakalvala
24. Raghavapur
25. Raginedu
26. Rampalli
27. Gopaiahpalli
28. Turkala Maddikunta
