= State Highway 1 (Telangana) =

Road in Telangana, India

State Highway 1
- Map of State Highway 1 Telangana

Route information
- Length: 207 km (129 mi)
- Existed: 2014; 12 years ago–present

Major junctions
- From: Hyderabad
- To: Ramagundam

Location
- Country: India
- State: Telangana
- Primary destinations: Karimnagar, Siddipet

Highway system
- Roads in India; Expressways; National; State; Asian; State Highways in Telangana
→ SH 2

State Highway 1, also known as Rajiv Rahadhari (Highway) (SH-1) is a four lane express Toll road in Northern Telangana, India. It is managed by Hyderabad-Karimnagar-Ramagundam (HKR) Roadways Limited.

The highway begins at Shamirpet ORR Entrance in Hyderabad and joins National Highway 63 at the Indaram Jaipur mandal of Mancherial district.

== Alternate names ==
1. Rajiv Rahadaari - రాజీవ్ రహదారి ,राजीव सडक
2. Rajiv Highway
3. Telangana State SH-1 ( Formerly Andhra Pradesh SH-1)
4. Hyderabad-Karimnagar-Ramagundam Road (HKRR)

== Toll plazas ==
- Toll Plaza-1 km.91.450 (Duddeda, Siddipet)
- Toll Plaza-2 km.140.050

(Renikunta, Karimnagar)

- Toll Plaza-3 km.208.100 (Basanthnagar, Kesoram Cement Factory, Near Ramagundam Airport)

== See also ==
- List of state highways in Telangana
- State Highway 11 (Telangana)
