= Ramagundam =

City in Telangana, India

- City Corporation
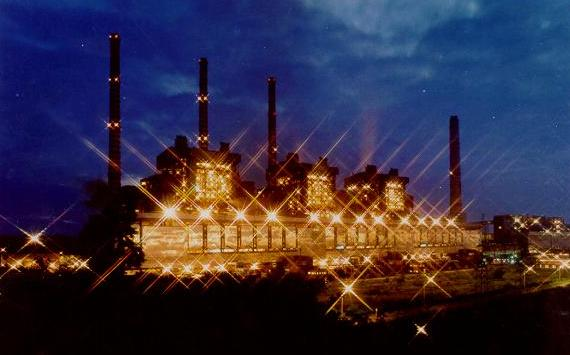
- Ramagundam Super Thermal Power Station
- Nickname: Manchester of Telangana
- Location in Telangana State, India Ramagundam (India) Ramagundam (Asia)
- Coordinates: 18°45′50″N 79°28′30″E
- Country: India
- State: Telangana
- District: Peddapalli
- Named for: Lord Rama

Government
  - Type: Municipal Corporation
  - Body: Ramagundam Municipal Corporation
  - Mayor: Mahankali Swamy
  - Deputy Mayor: Patipelli Ellayya
  - M.L.A.: Makkan Singh Raj Thakur
  - Commissioner of Police: Sri M.Srinivasulu, IPS

Area
  - Total: 93.87 km^{2} (36.24 sq mi)
  - Rank: 8
- Elevation: 179 m (587 ft)

Population (2011)
  - Total: 229,644
  - Rank: 196th (India); 8th (Telangana)
  - Density: 2,446/km^{2} (6,336/sq mi)
- Demonym: Godavarikhanite

Hindi/Urdu, Malayalam & English

Telugu
- Time zone: UTC+5:30 (IST)
- PIN: 505208, 505209, 505210,505211,505214,505215
- Telephone code: 08728
- Vehicle registration: TS-22
- Website: Ramagudam Municipal Corporation

Ramagundam is a city under municipal corporation in Peddapalli district of the Indian state of Telangana. It is the most populous city in the district and falls under the Ramagundam revenue division. It is located on the banks of the Godavari River. As of the 2011 census, the city had a population of 229,644, making it the 8th most populous in the state, and an urban agglomeration population of 242,979. It is located about 225 km from the state capital Hyderabad.

== Etymology ==
The city's name derives from a combination of two words, Rama and Gundam. A famous temple of the Hindu god Rama is situated in the old part of the city, where as Gundam means "water springs" are present.

== Geography ==
Ramagundam is located at 18.7638°N 79.4750°E. It has an average elevation of 179 meters (590 feet). It is about 225 kilometres (140 mi) northeast of the state capital, Hyderabad, 65 km from Karimnagar, 0 km from Peddapalli district headquarters and 0.1 km from Godavarikhani.

== Demographics ==
Historical population
Year	Pop.	±%
1971	31,928	—
1981	82,908	+159.7%
1991	214,384	+158.6%
2001	236,600	+10.4%
2011	229,644	−2.9%

As of 2011 Indian census, Ramagundam had a population of 229,644. Males constituted 51% of the population and females 49%. Ramagundam has an average literacy rate of 69%; male literacy is 75.3%, while female literacy is 62.4%. In Ramagundam, 8% of the population is under 6 years of age. Ramagundam is the only municipal corporation in Peddapalli district and it is only municipal corporation in the state with no recognition of revenue division/district status.

== Climate ==
Ramagundam experiences dry inland climatic conditions with hot summers and cool winters. The city of Ramagundam gets most of its rainfall from the Southwest monsoon. The summer season is extremely hot, but temperatures decline with the onset of the monsoons, and the winter season is generally cool. The most popular season for tourism is from November to February.

The summer season starts in March and can continue through early June. During this period temperatures range from a minimum of 25 °C to a maximum of 40 °C. The highest recorded temperature in the area is around 47.3 °C. Nights are much cooler, and the humidity is around 50%. The city experiences the most rainfall in July and August, from the Southwest monsoon, with the highest rainfall being 112mm and an average annual rainfall of 1129.2mm. During this time, daytime temperatures average around 32 °C. There is additional rainfall in September and October due to Northeast rainfall. The winter season starts in November and lasts through February. During this time, temperatures range from a minimum of 14 °C to a maximum of 32 °C.

Climate data for Ramagundam (1991–2020, extremes 1948–2020)
Month	Jan	Feb	Mar	Apr	May	Jun	Jul	Aug	Sep	Oct	Nov	Dec	Year
Record high °C (°F)	36.0 (96.8)	39.6 (103.3)	43.0 (109.4)	46.1 (115.0)	47.3 (117.1)	47.2 (117.0)	41.0 (105.8)	37.9 (100.2)	38.6 (101.5)	38.4 (101.1)	36.6 (97.9)	35.5 (95.9)	47.3 (117.1)
Mean daily maximum °C (°F)	30.4 (86.7)	33.4 (92.1)	36.9 (98.4)	39.8 (103.6)	42.2 (108.0)	37.4 (99.3)	32.6 (90.7)	31.5 (88.7)	32.8 (91.0)	33.0 (91.4)	31.6 (88.9)	30.1 (86.2)	34.3 (93.7)
Mean daily minimum °C (°F)	15.2 (59.4)	18.0 (64.4)	21.7 (71.1)	25.5 (77.9)	28.2 (82.8)	27.2 (81.0)	25.2 (77.4)	24.7 (76.5)	24.4 (75.9)	22.3 (72.1)	18.1 (64.6)	14.6 (58.3)	22.1 (71.8)
Record low °C (°F)	6.8 (44.2)	8.4 (47.1)	13.0 (55.4)	15.4 (59.7)	20.4 (68.7)	19.4 (66.9)	18.8 (65.8)	19.8 (67.6)	17.8 (64.0)	15.0 (59.0)	9.0 (48.2)	7.5 (45.5)	6.8 (44.2)
Average rainfall mm (inches)	10.2 (0.40)	8.6 (0.34)	10.4 (0.41)	16.5 (0.65)	20.8 (0.82)	156.6 (6.17)	276.9 (10.90)	263.2 (10.36)	182.8 (7.20)	84.0 (3.31)	13.6 (0.54)	3.9 (0.15)	1,047.5 (41.24)
Average rainy days	0.8	0.5	0.7	1.2	2.6	8.0	13.7	13.1	9.0	4.5	0.9	0.3	54.4
Average relative humidity (%) (at 17:30 IST)	45	38	34	34	31	51	68	73	70	64	55	49	51
Source: India Meteorological Department

== Government and politics ==
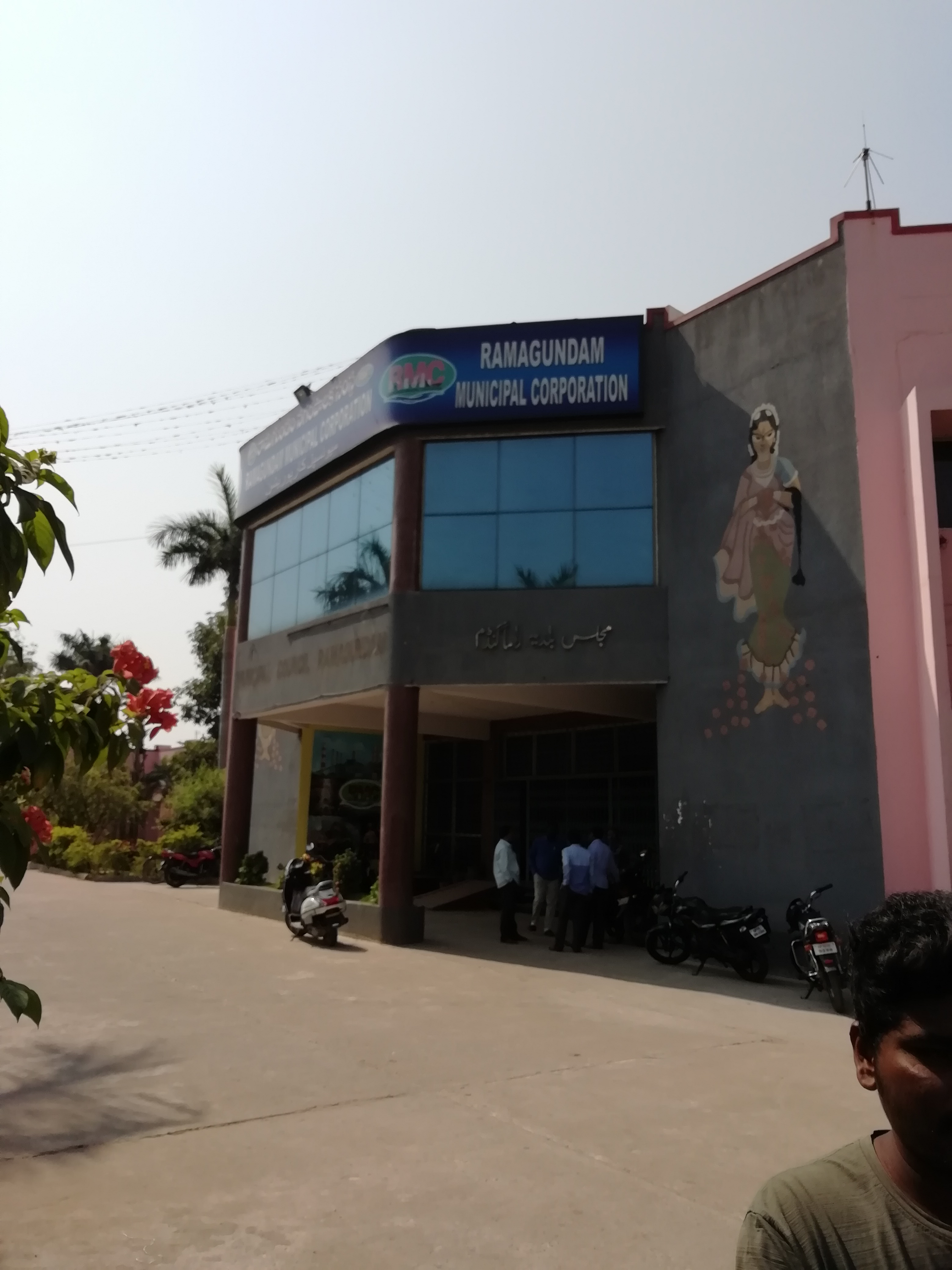
Ramagundam Municipal Corporation

The Ramagundam Municipal Corporation is the local governing body, administering the city. The municipal corporation consists of democratically elected members, is headed by a mayor and administers the city's governance, infrastructure and administration. This city is selected under central government scheme of AMRUT.

=== Law and order ===
Ramagundam Police Commissionerate is a city police force with primary responsibilities in law enforcement and investigation within districts of Ramagundam, and Mancherial.

=== Politics ===
Makkan singh Raj Thakur is elected as MLA for Ramagundam constituency from Indian National Congress in the elections held in December 2023. Korukanti Chandar is MLA from Ramagundam constituency who contested as an independent candidate in Telangana general assembly elections held in the year 2018 and later he joined ruling party Telangana Rashtra Samithi [TRS]. Somarapu Satyanarayana, who won as MLA for consecutive two times in a row in 2009 and 2014 elections from Ramagundam constituency, has been appointed as Telangana's first TSRTC Public Transport chairman in 2016.

== Economy ==
Ramagundam city is situated in the Godavari valley coalfields and has one of the India's largest thermal power stations in south region under NTPC.

Mostly industries are connected with Godavarikhani- NTPC Ramagundam. Some of them are Singareni, Fertilizer Corporation of India, Kesoram Cement, Basanth Nagar, National Fertilizers Limited, Engineers India Limited, TSGENCO thermal power station, Kesoram (Birla) cement factories, NTPC (RSTPS – Ramagundam Super Thermal Power Station) sourcing 2600 MW of power 24/7 and the TSSEB (Telangana State Electricity Board) unit at Ramagundam. Another 1600 MW (2x800 MW) is proposed as RDM-II as per expansion plan by NTPC Limited. NTPC's first SPV or Solar photovoltaic unit of capacity 25 MW (Phase-I 1x10 MW, Phase-II 1x15 MW) has been proposed at Ramagundam. This would help in earning carbon credits against use of solar power as renewable energy source.

Also, Sripada Yellampalli project, an irrigation project, is located near Ramagundam. Singareni's first Solar Power Plant of capacity 50 MW has been proposed at Ramagundam.

Telangana Super Thermal Power Project was inaugurated in 2023 in the town.

== Education ==
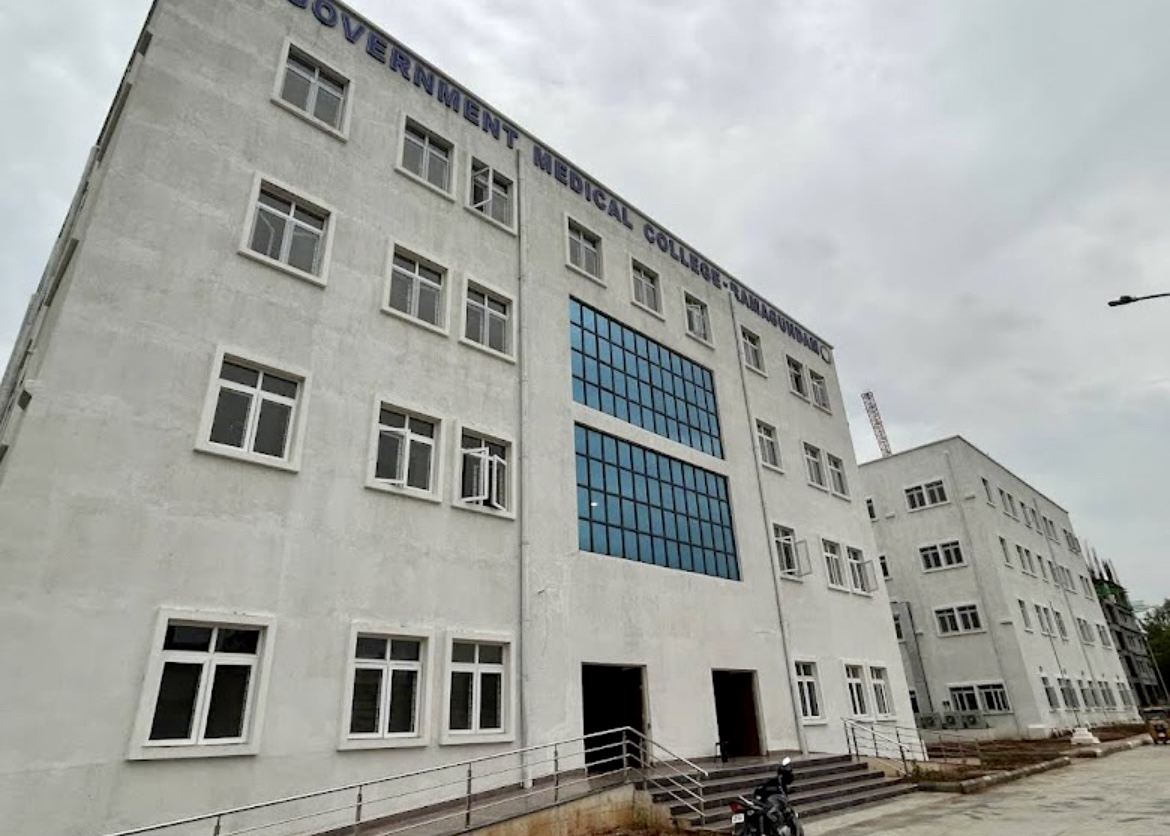
Singareni Institute of Medical Sciences College Ramagundam

Ramagundam has a variety of higher education institutions. Since 2022, Ramagundam with funds of Singareni Colleries has its own government medical college.

== Transport ==
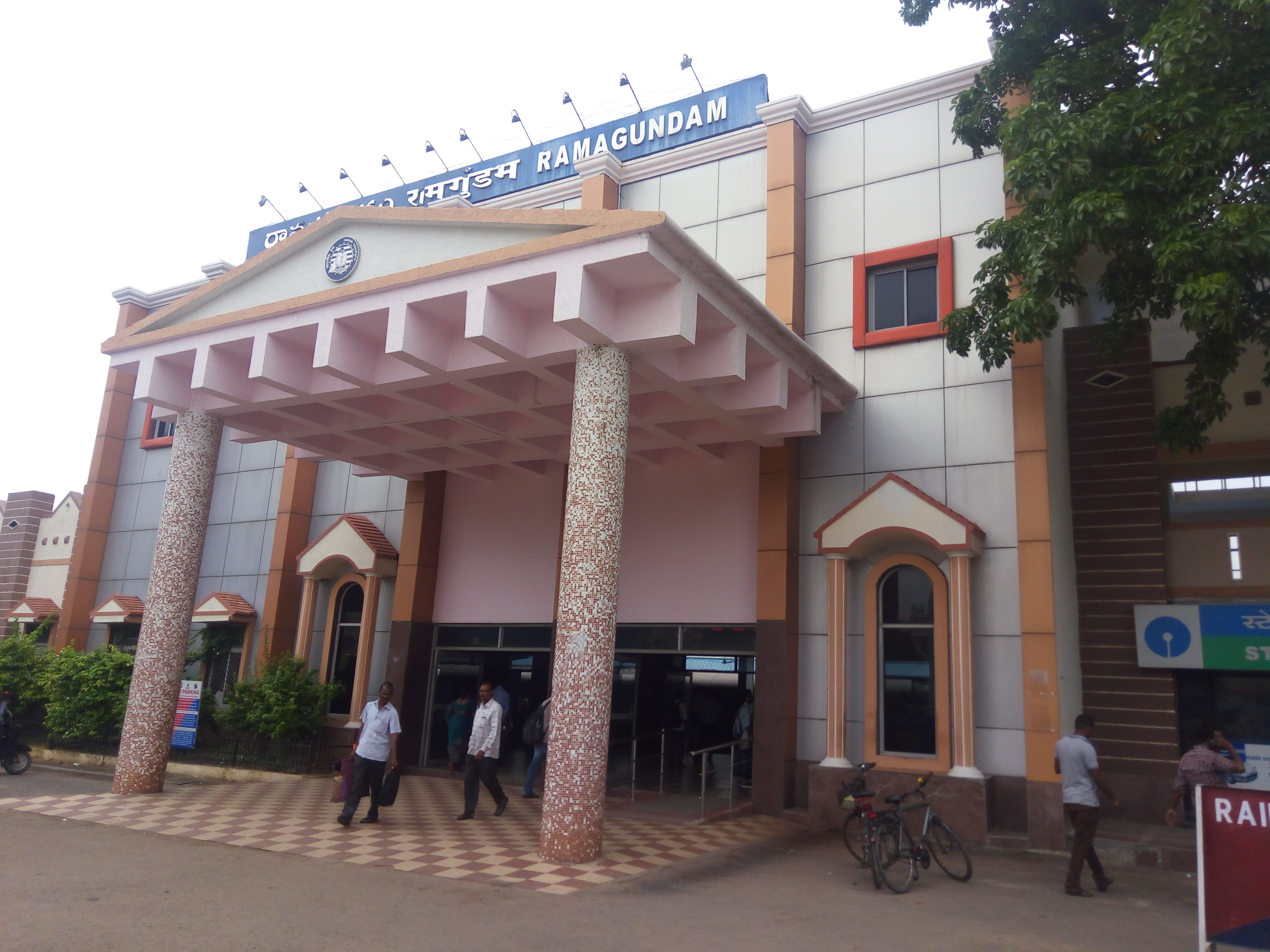
Ramagundam railway station

=== Road ===
State Highway 1 (Telangana) is connected with Hyderabad-Karimnagar-Ramagundam Godavarikhani Highway. TGSRTC Godavarikhani and MSRTC(ST) operates buses and connects Ramagundam (Godavarikhani) to major parts of the state. Godavarikhani depot runs City buses in Ramagundam Corporation limits. This city is directly connected by road to capital city Hyderabad by SH 1 which starts from this city. National Highway 63 is close by.

=== Rail ===
Ramagundam railway station falls under the jurisdiction of Secunderabad railway division of South Central Railway zone is B category station.

=== Air ===
Ramagundam Airport is the airport situated in Basanthnagar. It is not functional. It is located in centre of 4 districts so state government proposed to develop this airport. Central government plans to run flight services to this city under UDAN plan. The nearest airport is Rajiv Gandhi International Airport in Hyderabad which is around 270 km from Ramagundam.
