= Jammikunta =

- Town
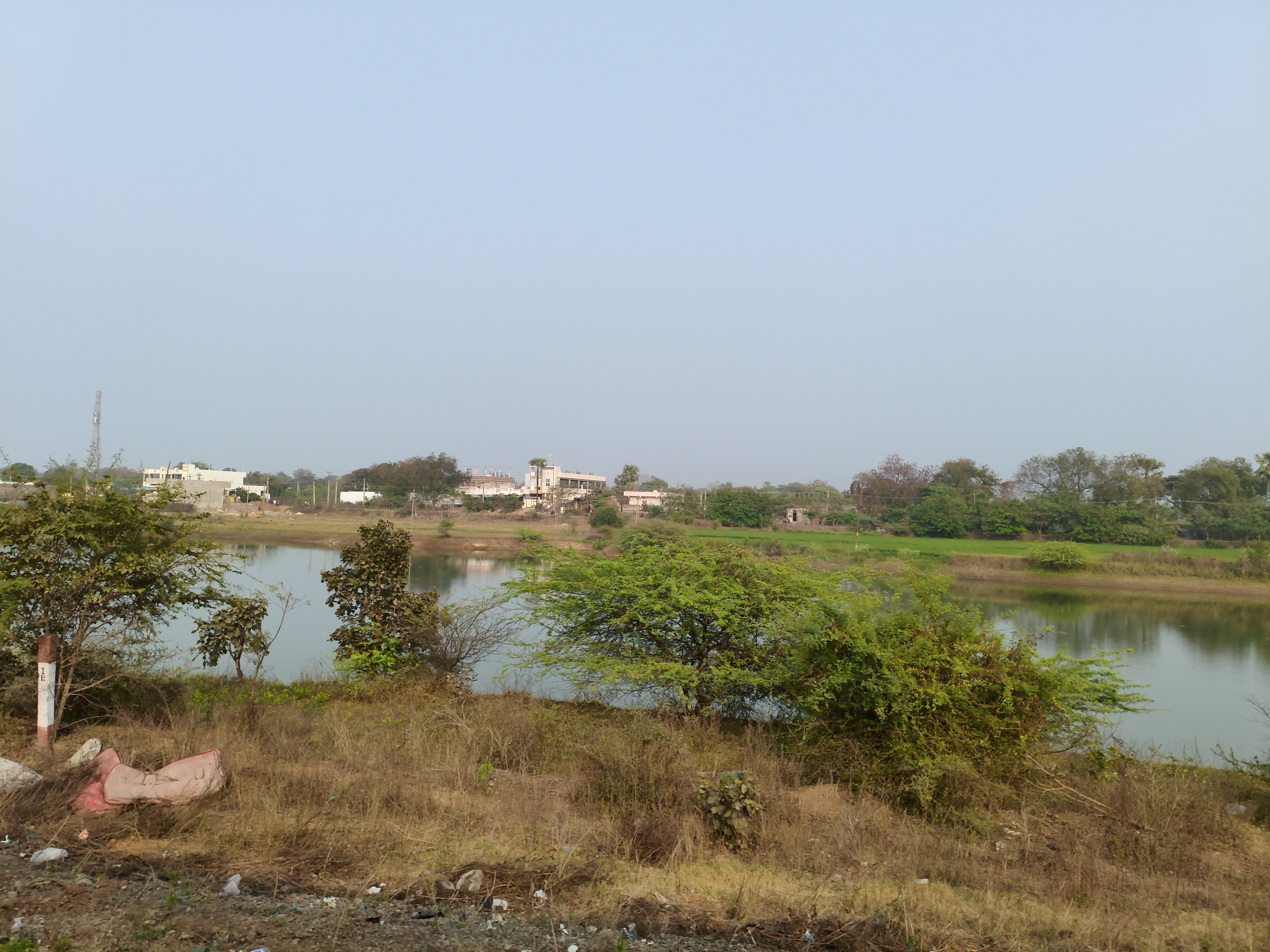

- Location in Telangana, India Jammikunta (India)
- Coordinates: 18.286408°N 79.47607°E
- Country: India
- State: Telangana
- District: Karimnagar

Area
  - Total: 30.97 km^{2} (11.96 sq mi)

Population (2011)
  - Total: 32,645
  - Density: 1,054/km^{2} (2,730/sq mi)

Language
  - Official: Telugu
  - Additional official: Urdu
- Time zone: UTC+5:30 (IST)
- PIN: 505122

Jammikunta is a town and mandal in Karimnagar district of the state of Telangana, India. At the 2011 census it had a population of 32,645, 16,894 males and 15,751 females.

== Transport ==
=== Rail ===
Being situated on Kazipet- Ramagundam Railway line, Jammikunta Railway station is well connected with metropolis such as Secunderabad, Hyderabad, Kazipet, warangal, Vijayawada, Tirupati, etc.and nearby railway stations are Uppal railway station and Bizigiri sharif station.

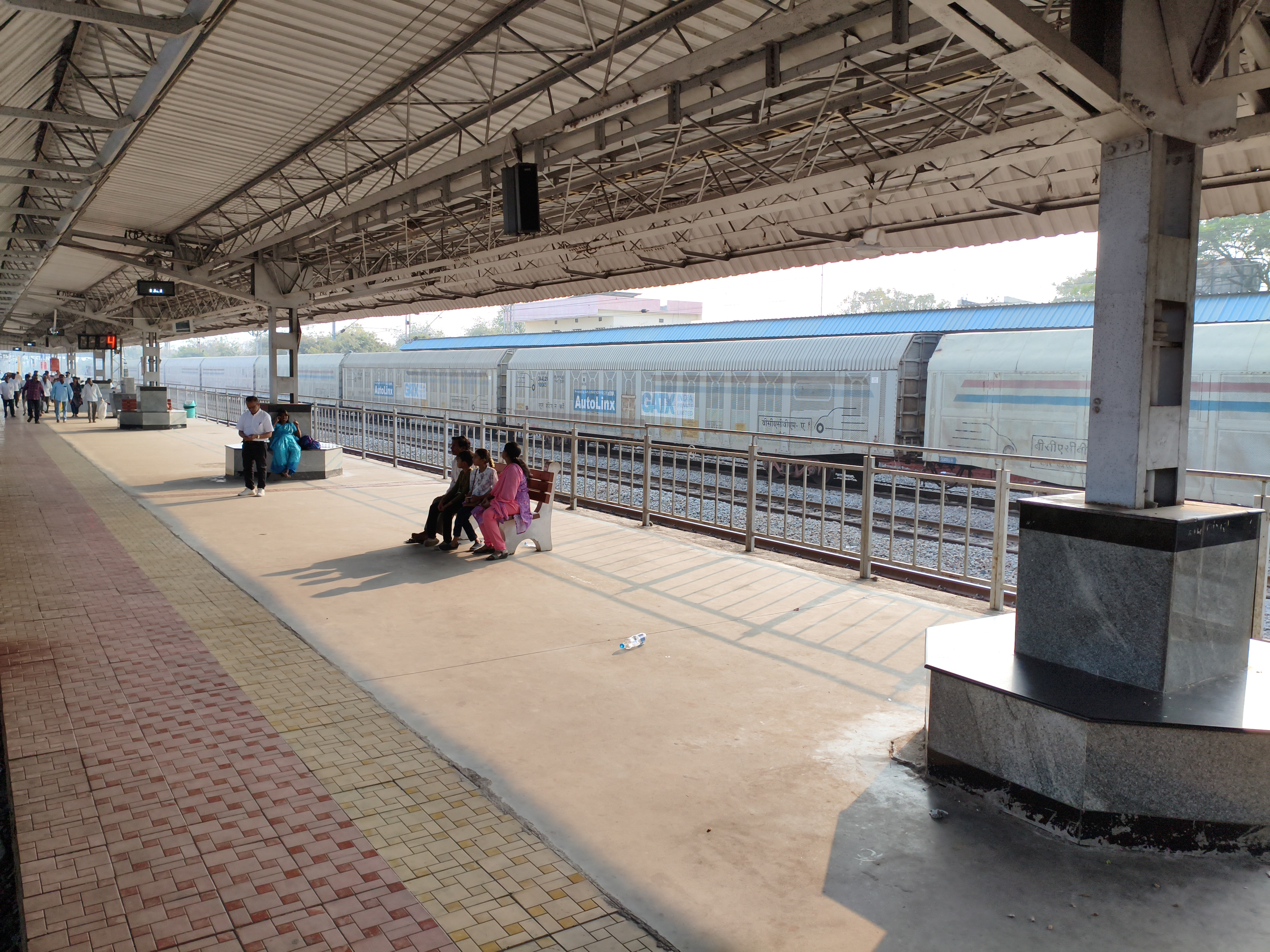
Platform and Car Carrier at Jamikunta railway station

=== Road ===
The Telangana State Road Transport Corporation operates bus services from Jammikunta bus station.

== See also ==
- Illanthakunta
