= Peddapalli district =

- District of Telangana
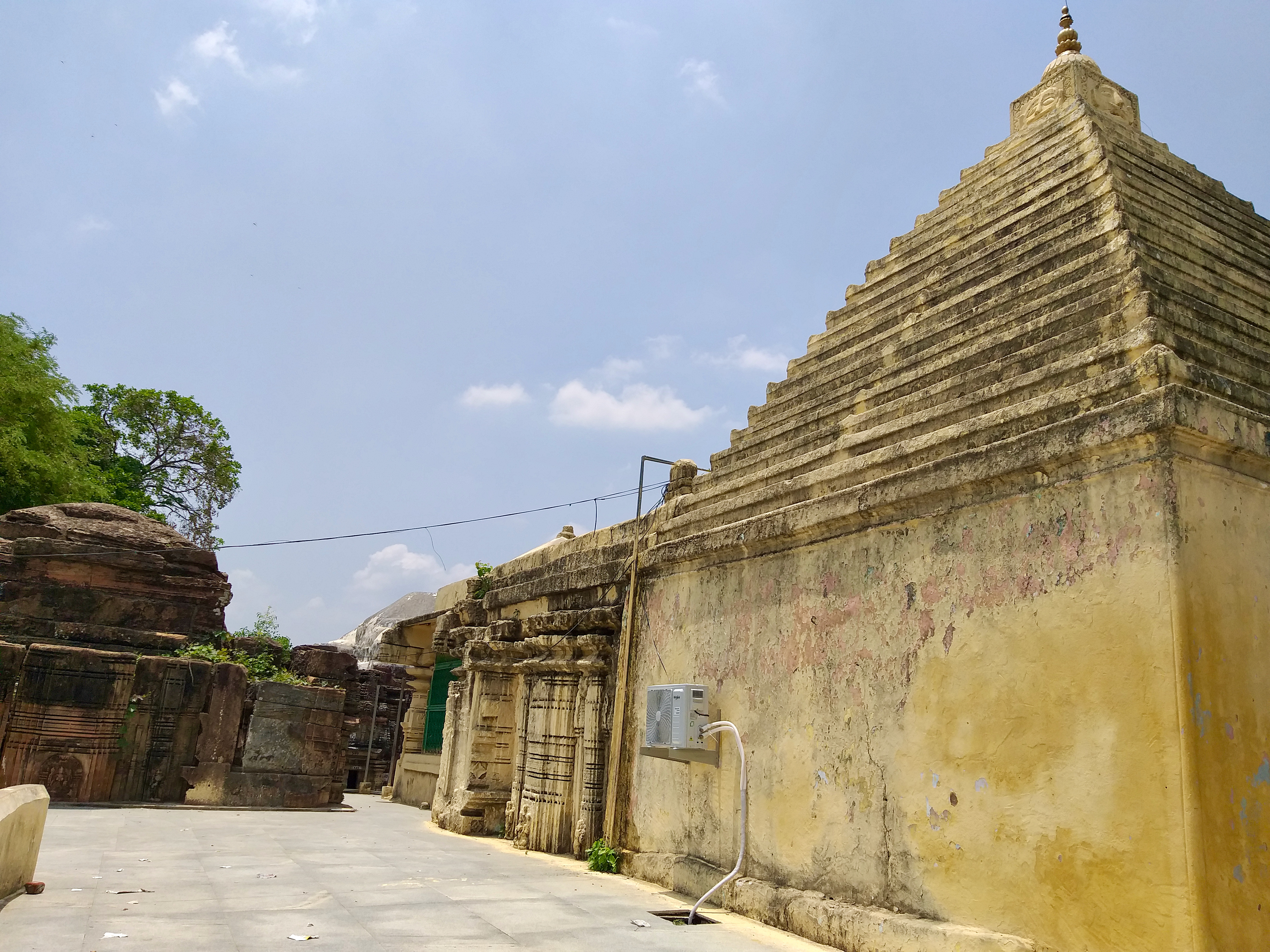
- Gautameshwara Temple, Manthani

- Location in Telangana
- Peddapalli district
- Country: India
- State: Telangana
- Established: 2016
- Headquarters: Peddapalli
- Mandals: 14

Government
  - District collector: Abdul Muzammil Khan
  - Parliament constituencies: Peddapalli
  - Assembly constituencies: Peddapalli, Ramagundam, Manthani

Area
  - Total: 2,236 km^{2} (863 sq mi)

Population (2011)
  - Total: 795,332
  - Density: 355.7/km^{2} (921.2/sq mi)
- Time zone: UTC+05:30 (IST)
- Vehicle registration: TG–22
- Literacy Rate: 65.52%
- Website: peddapalli.telangana.gov.in

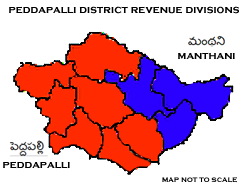
Peddapalli District Revenue divisions

Peddapalli district is a district located in the northern region of the Indian state of Telangana. Its administrative headquarters is at Peddapalli and Commissionerate is at Ramagundam. The district shares boundaries with Mancherial, Karimnagar, Jagtial and Jayashankar Bhupalpally districts. This district covers Ramagundam city which is situated in the Godavari valley coalfields and has one of the India's largest thermal power stations in south region under NTPC. Mostly industries are connected with Godavarikhani - NTPC - Ramagundam.

== History ==
Peddapalli district was created out of Karimnagar district in 2016 during the general reorganization of districts in Telangana.

== Geography ==
The district is spread over an area of 2,236 square kilometres (863 sq mi).

== Administrative divisions ==
Peddapalli District Revenue Divisions Mandals Information List.

Demographic Label	Value	Remarks
No. of Revenue Disivions	2	Peddapalli, Manthani
No. of Revenue Mandals	14	
No. of Mandal Praja Parishads	13	
No. of Gram Panchayats	263	
No. of Municipalities	3	Peddapalli, Manthani, Sultanabad
No. of Municipal Corporations	1	Ramagundam
No. of Revenue Villages	215	

=== Mandals ===
There are 14 mandals are in the district.

S. No.	Manthani Revenue Division	Peddapalli Revenue Division
1	Kamanpur	Anthergaon
2	Manthani	Dharmaram
3	Mutharam	Eligaid
4	Ramagiri	Julapalli
5		Kalva Srirampur
6		Odela
7		Palakurthy (Basanthnagar)
8		Peddapalli
9		Ramagundam Urban
10		Sulthanabad

=== Villages ===
There are 215 revenue villages in the district.

- Abbapur
- Abbapuram
- Adavisomanpalle
- Adavisrirampur
- Adial
- Adivarampeta
- Adrial
- Akena palli
- Akkepalle
- Allur
- Ammagaripalle
- Andugulapalli
- Angulur
- Anthergoam
- Appannapet
- Arenda
- Bandampalli
- Banjerupally
- Basanth nagar
- Begumpet
- Bestapally
- Bhatpalle
- Bhatpally
- Bhitpalli
- Bhojannapet
- Bhoopathipuram
- Bitpalle (k)
- Bittupally
- Bommareddypalli
- Bompalli
- Botlavanaparthy
- Brahmanpalli
- Budhavarampeta
- Burahanmayapet
- Chamanpalle
- Chandapalli
- Cheekurai
- Cheemalapeta
- Chillapally
- Chinna Bonkur
- Chinna Kalvala
- Chinna Komera
- Dariyapur
- Dharmaram
- Dongathurthy
- Donthulapally
- Doolikatta
- Dubbapally
- Dubbapet
- Edulapuram
- Eklaspur
- Eklaspur
- Eligaid
- Elkalpalle
- Esalatakkalapally
- Gaddalapalle
- Gajulapally
- Gangaram
- Garrepalle
- Gattepalle
- Gattusingaram
- Goilwada
- Gollapalle
- Gollapally
- Gopalpur
- Gopalraopet
- Gowreddipet
- Gudem
- Gudipalle
- Gumnoor
- Gumpula
- Gundaram
- Gundlapalli
- Gunjapadu
- Gurrampalli
- Haripur
- Haripuram
- Indurthi
- Ippalapalle
- Isala Tekkalla Palle
- Ithrajpalle
- Jafarkhanpet
- Jallaram
- Jallipalle
- Jangoam
- Jayyarm
- Jeelakunta
- Jillelapalli
- Julapalle
- Kachapur
- Kadambapur
- Kakarlapally
- Kalwacherla
- Kamanpur
- Kammarikhanpeta
- Kanagarthy
- Kannala
- Kanukula
- Kasipet
- Kasulapally
- Katnepalle
- Khanampalle
- Khanapur
- Khansabpet
- Khilavanaparthy
- Kistampet
- Kodurupaka
- Kolanur / Kolanoor
- Kothapalle
- Kothapally
- Kothur
- Kuchirajpalle
- Kukkalagudur
- Kummarikunta
- Kunaram
- Kundanpalle
- Ladnapoor
- Lakkapur
- Lakkaram
- Lalapalli
- Lankakesaram
- Laxmipur
- Lingala
- Lingapur
- Lokapet
- Machupeta
- Madaka
- Maddiriyala
- Maidipalle
- Malkapur
- Mallapur
- Mallaram
- Mallepalle
- Mallial
- Mallialpalli
- Mancharami
- Mangapet
- Manthani
- Maredpaka
- Maredugonda
- Maredupalle
- Medipalle
- Mirzampet
- Miyapur
- Mogalpahad (n.e)
- Motlapalle
- Mulasala
- Mulkalapalle
- Munjampalle
- Muppirithota
- Murmoor
- Mustial
- Mutharam
- Myadaram
- Mydambanda
- Nadimipally
- Nagaram
- Nagepally
- Nagulapalli
- Namsanipalle
- Narsapoor
- Narsimhulapalli
- Narsingapur
- Neerukulla
- Nellipalli
- Nimmanapalle
- Nittur
- Odedu
- Odela
- Paidichinthala palle
- Palakurthy
- Palilthem
- Palthem
- Pandilla
- Pandulapalle
- Pandulapally
- Pannur
- Paratpalle
- Parthipaka
- Parupalle
- Pathipaka
- Pathkapalle
- Pedda Bonkur
- Pedda Kalvala
- Pedda Komera
- Peddampet
- Peddapalle (urban)
- Peddapur
- Pegadapalle
- Penchikalpet
- Perapalle
- Poosala
- Potharam
- Potiyala
- Putnoor
- Puttapaka
- Rachepalle
- Raghavapur
- Ragineedu
- Ragnapoor
- Raidandi
- Rajapur
- Ramagundam (U)
- Ramaiah palli
- Ramaraopally
- Rampalle
- Ranapur
- Rangaiahpalli
- Rangampalle
- Rangapur
- Rathupalle
- Ratnapur
- Rebbaldevipalle
- Regadimaddikunta
- Rompikunta
- Roopnarayanpet
- Ryakaldevpalli
- Sabitham
- Sanagonda
- Sarnepalle
- Sarvaram
- Sayampeta
- Seethampeta
- Shastrulapally
- Shatharajpalle
- Shivapalli
- Shukravarampalli
- Siripuram
- Somanapalle
- Srirampur
- Suddala
- Sukravarampeta
- Sultanabad
- Sulthanpoor
- Sundilla
- Suraiahpally
- Swarnapalle
- Swarnapally
- Telukunta
- Tharupalle
- Thoagarrai
- Thotagopaiahpally
- Turkalamaddi Kunta
- Undeda
- Upparapalli
- Upparla Kesaram
- Uppatla
- Velgalapahad
- Vemnoor
- Vempad
- Venkatapur
- Venkatraopalli
- Vennampalle
- Vilochavaram
- Wadkapur
- Yellamapalle
- Yerraguntapalli

== Demographics ==
Religions in Peddapalli district (2011)
Religion	Percent
Hinduism	92.94%
Islam	6.01%
Christianity	0.71%
Other or not stated	0.34%
Distribution of religions

As of 2011 Census of India, the district has a population of 795,332, of which 304,013 (38.22%) live in urban areas. Peddapalli district has a sex ratio of 992 females per 1000 males and a literacy rate of 65.52%. 66,812 (8.40%) are under 6 years of age. Scheduled Castes and Scheduled Tribes make up 154,855 (19.47%) and 14,945 (1.88%) of the population respectively.

Languages of Peddapalli district (2011)
1. Telugu (92.1%)
2. Urdu (5.41%)
3. Others (2.47%)

At the time of the 2011 census, 92.13% of the population spoke Telugu and 5.41% Urdu as their first language.

== Transport ==
=== Road ===
Peddapalli is well connected with the road transportation. The district has a district headquarters, two state highways SH-1 and SH-7 and no national highways. The district has two Telangana State Road Transport Corporation bus depots named Godavarikhani (GDK) and Manthani (MNTY).

=== Rail ===
The district is well connected with rail transportation which is operated by Secunderabad Railway Division of the South Central Railway Zone. The district has a main railway line which connects New Delhi (NDLS) - Chennai Central (MAS) and another line of Peddapalli (PDPL) - Nizamabad (NZB).

List of railway stations in Peddapalli District with railway station codes:

Railway Station Code	Railway Station Name
PPZ	Peddampet Railway Station
RDM	Ramagundam Railway Station
RGPM	Raghavapuram Railway Station
PDPL	Peddapalli Junction Railway Station
KYOP	Kottapalli railway station
KOLR	Kolanoor Railway Station
OEA	Odela Railway Station
PTKP	Potkapalli Railway Station

=== Air ===
Airport Code IATA: RMD, ICAO: VORG

The district has an (closed) airport with 1,300m runway located at Kesoram Cement Factory, BasanthNagar, Ramagundam. It is owned by the Birla Family and is operated by the Airports Authority of India. After the closure of Vayudoot it has not been of regular use. It is an unused airport now. The Government of Telangana is planning to develop this airport as a part of other airports in the state of Telangana by 2022 as it can be served for 4 districts i.e. Peddapalli, Mancherial, Karimnagar and Jagtial.

== See also ==
- Peddapalle (Lok Sabha constituency)
- Peddapalle (Assembly constituency)
- Ramagundam (Assembly constituency)
- Manthani (Assembly constituency)
- List of districts in Telangana
- Ramagiri Fort
- NTPC Ramagundam
- Sripada Yellampalli project
