= List of dams and reservoirs in Telangana =

The following are the dams and reservoirs located in Telangana. Telangana is known as the Land of Dams, Reservoirs, Lakes, Tanks and Canals and has the most number of Dams, Reservoirs, Lakes, Tanks and Canals than any other South Indian state. Telangana Irrigation is going to be face lifted with new Key projects under construction such as Kaleshwaram Project, Palamuru-Rangareddy Lift Irrigation Scheme, Sitarama Lift Irrigation, TupakulaGudem, Kalwakurthy Projects.

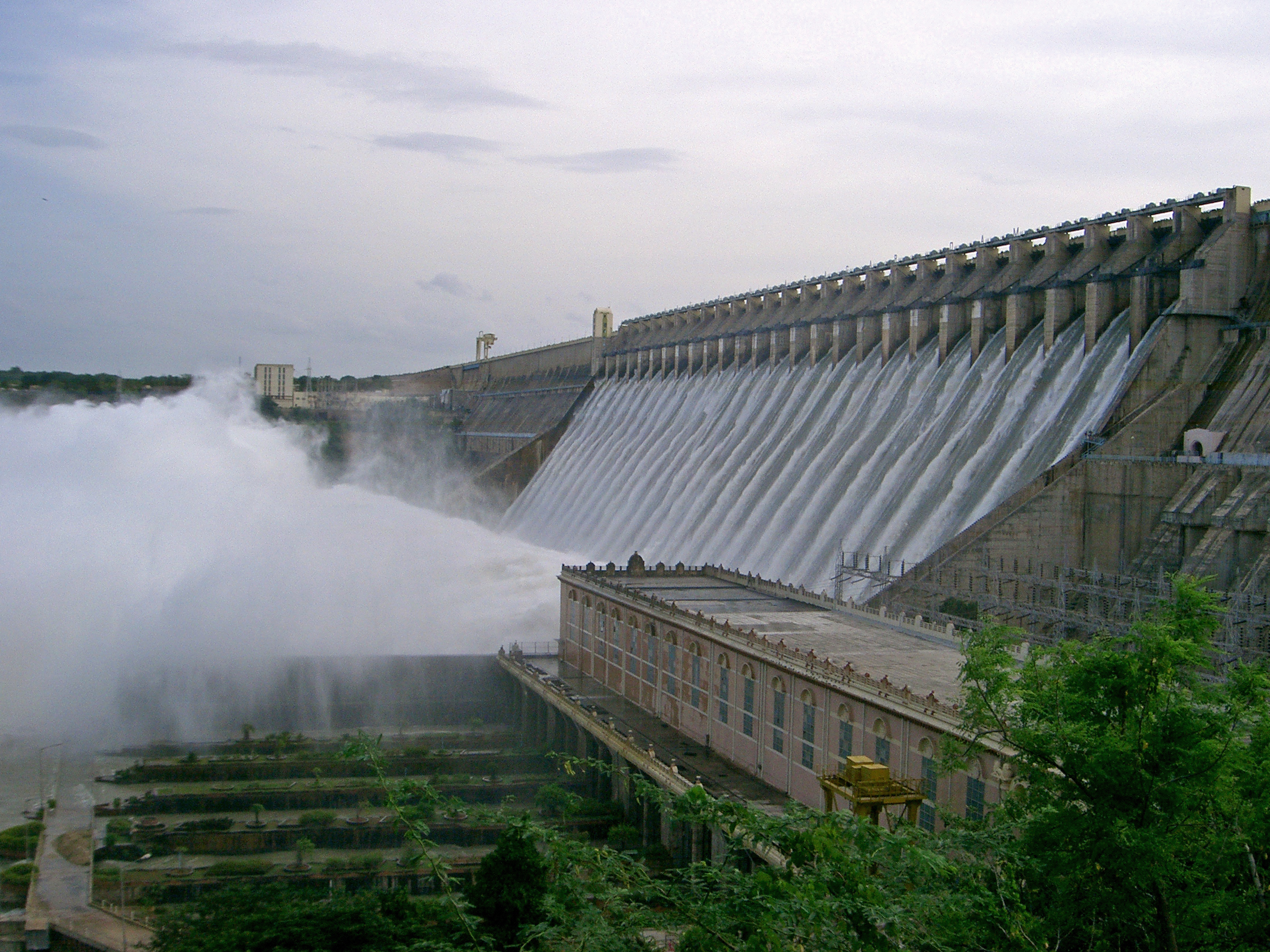
Nagarjuna Sagar Dam gates and power house view

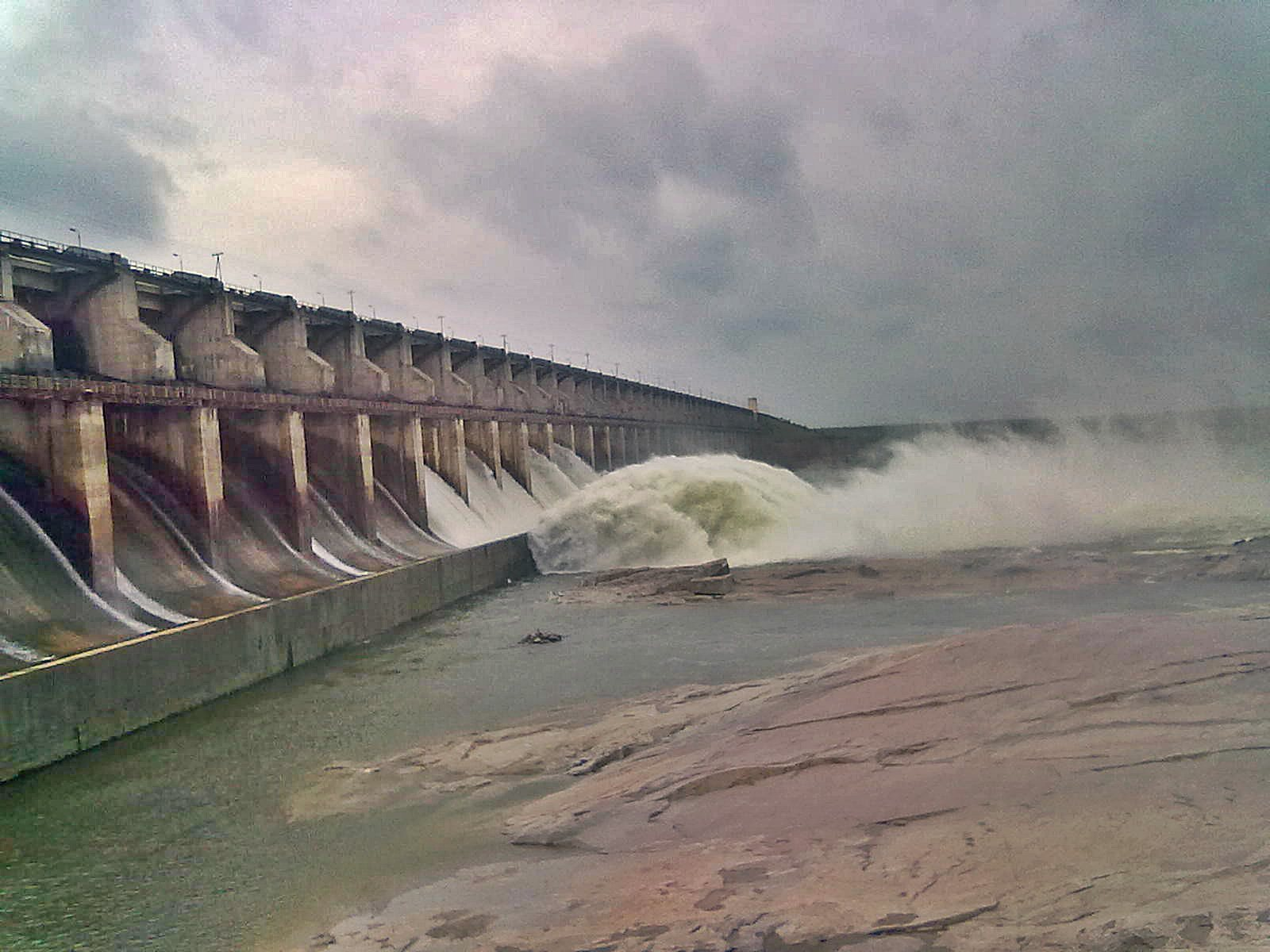
SriRam Sagar Dam on Godavari River in Pochampahad

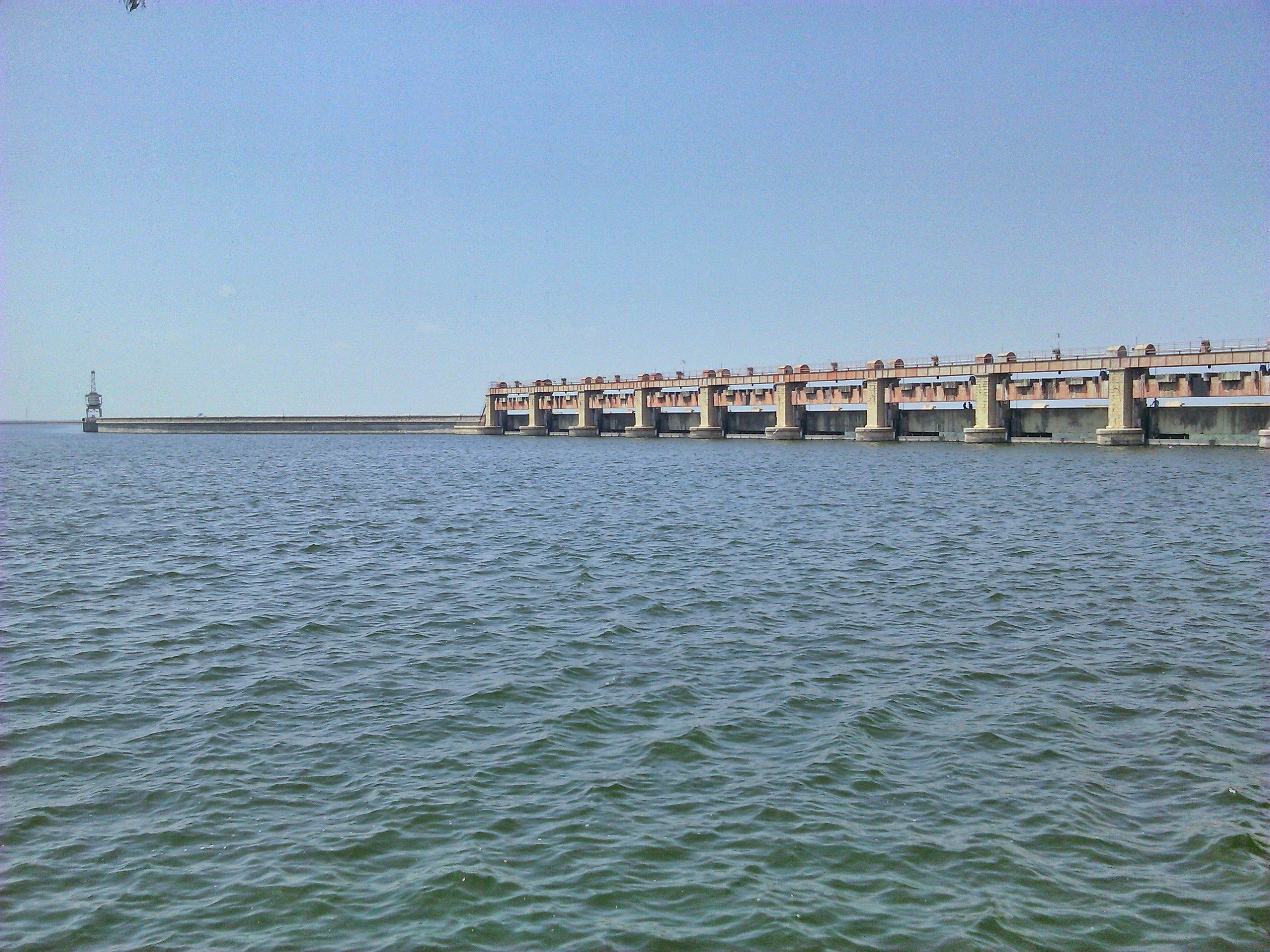
Nizam Sagar, Nizamabad

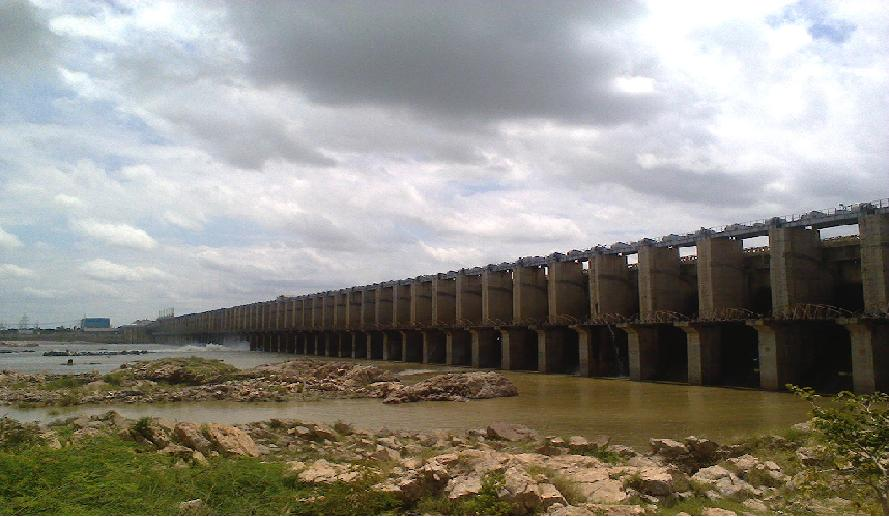
Jurala Project gates view on Krishna River in Mahabubnagar

== List of Major Irrigation dams and Reservoirs in Telangana ==
Name & Place	Gross Storage (TMC)	River Basin	Constructed Year	Command Area (acres)
Singur Dam, Sangareddy	29.917	Godavari River	1989	
Nizam Sagar, Kamareddy	17.80	Godavari River	1931	
Sriram Sagar Project	90.31	Godavari River	1977	
Sadarmat Barrage	1.6	Godavari River	Under Construction	
Mallannasagar Reservoir	50	Godavari River	2022	
Yellampalli, Karimnagar	20.17	Godavari River		
Lower Manair Dam, Karimnagar	24.07	Godavari River	1985	
Mid Manair Dam, Karimagar	25.87	Godavari River	2017	
Upper Manair Dam,(narmala)Karimnagar	2.20	Godavari River	1985	
Tummidihetti Barrage	2.0	Godavari River	Proposed	
Medigadda Barrage	19.5	Godavari River	2019	
Annaram Barrage	11.90	Godavari River	2019	
Sundilla Barrage	5.11	Godavari River	2019	
Icchampally Project	367	Godavari River	Proposed	
Sammakka Barrage	6.95	Godavari River	Under construction	
Janampet Barrage	8.863	Godavari River	Under construction	
Sitamma Sagar Barrage	36.576	Godavari River	Under construction	
Kadam Reservoir, Adilabad	7.60	Godavari River	1958	
Sri Komaram Bheem Project, Adilabad		Godavari River	2011	
Dummugudem Lift Irrigation Scheme, Khammam (Sitarama Lift Irrigation)		Godavari River		
Vattivagu Reservoir, Adilabad		Godavari River		
Pranahita Chevella (Tummidihatti Barrage)		Godavari River		
Swarna Reservoir, Adilabad		Godavari River		
Sathnala Dam, Adilabad		Godavari River		
Nawabpet Reservoir		Godavari River		
Tapaspalli Reservoir		Godavari River		
Pocharam Dam Reservoir		Godavari River		
Manjeera Reservoir		Godavari River		
Devadula project		Godavari River		
Pakhala Reservoir		Godavari River		
Palakurthy Reservoir		Godavari River		
Kinnerasani Reservoir		Godavari River		
Kanthapally Barrage		Godavari River		
Alisagar Reservoir, Nizamabad		Godavari River	1931	
Alisagar Lift Irrigation Scheme, Nizamabad		Godavari River	2002	
Lower Penganga River Irrigation Project Maharashtra (Yavatmal and Chandrapur districts) and Telangana (Adilabad)		Godavari River	1997	
Lendi, Nizamabad and Maharashtra		Godavari River		
Sadarmat, Adilabad	1.58	Godavari River		
Pedavagu, Adilabad		Godavari River		
Neelwai, Adilabad		Godavari River		
Ralevagu, Adilabad		Godavari River		
Gollavagu, Adilabad		Godavari River		
Suddavagu, Adilabad		Godavari River		
Chelmelavagu Project (NTR Sagar), Adilabad		Godavari River		
PP Rao Project, Adilabad		Godavari River		
Nagarjuna Sagar Dam, Nalgonda	312.04	Krishna River	1967	
Nagarjuna Sagar tail pond, Nalgonda		Krishna River	u/c	
Jurala Project, Mahbubnagar	9.66	Krishna River	1995	
Lower Jurala HEP, Mahabubnagar		Krishna River		
Rajolibanda Dam		Tungabhadra River	1956	
Dindi Reservoir	2.0	Krishna River		
Dindi Balancing Reservoir (Nakkalgandi Reservoir)	7.5	Krishna River	U/C	
Osman Sagar Reservoir	3.9	Krishna River		
Himayath Sagar	2.9	Krishna River		
Musi Reservoir	3.8	Krishna River		
Koilsagar	3.9	Krishna River		
Mathadivagu Reservoir				
Shankara Samudram Balancing Reservoir		Krishna River		
Alimineti Madhava Reddy Project		Krishna River		
Udaya Samudram Balancing Reservoir		Krishna River		
Peddadevulapally Balancing Reservoir				
Ramanpad reservoir		Krishna River		
Gundrevula reservoir, Gundrevula, Mahaboobnagar and Kurnool		Krishna River		
Singotam reservoir		Krishna River		
Jonnalaboguda reservoir	2.14	Krishna River		
Pulkurthy Reservoir		Godavari River		
Salivagu Reservoir				
Nashkal Reservoir				
Mylaram Reservoir				
Chalivagu Reservoir				
Narsingapur Reservoir				
Bheemghanpur Reservoir				
Rangaiah-Yerraiah Reservoir				
Wyra Reservoir				
Palair Reservoir	2.5	Krishna River		
Shanigaram Reservoir				
Thotapally Reservoir				
Sarala Sagar Project	0.5	Krishna River	1959	

== List of Major Lift Irrigation Schemes In Telangana ==
Existing & Proposed Lift Irrigation Schemes:

S.No.	Lift Irrigation Project	Lift Irrigation Stage	No of Pumps	Discharge Capacity	River Basin	Lift Locations
1	Devadula	Devadula - Stage I			Godavari River	Gangaram Village, Warangal
2	Kalwakurthy	Kalwakurthy - Stage I			Krishna River	Yellur Reservoir, Mahabubnagar
3	Kalwakurthy	Kalwakurthy - Stage II veekshana			Krishna River	Jonnala boguda Reservoir, Mahabubnagar
4	Kalwakurthy	Kalwakurthy - Stage III			Krishna River	Gudipalli Reservoir, Mahabubnagar
5	Bhima	Bhima Stage I			Krishna River	
6	Bhima	Bhima Stage II			Krishna River	
7	Nettempadu	Nettempadu Stage I			Krishna River	
8	Alisagar	Alisagar Lift Irrigation Scheme			Godavari River	
9	Udaya Samudram	Udaya Samudram				
10	Kaleshwaram				Godavari River	Medigadda, Annaram, Sundilla, Yellampalli
