= Shanigaram Reservoir =

- Location within Telangana
- Official name: శనిగరం జలాశయం Shanigaram Reservoir
- Location: Shanigaram Village, Siddipet district, Telangana, India
- Coordinates: 18°11′10″N 79°00′50″E
- Purpose: Irrigation
- Status: Operational
- Opening date: 1891
- Construction cost: 540 seers (504 kg) of gold

Dam and spillways
- Type of dam: Earth fill dam
- Height: 16 metres (52 ft) from river level
- Length: 908 metres (2,979 ft)
- Spillway type: Ogee crest
- Spillway capacity: 14150 Cusec

Reservoir
- Creates: Shanigaram Reservoir
- Total capacity: 1.09 Tmcft
- Catchment area: 5100 Acres

Shanigaram Reservoir (Telugu:శనిగరం జలాశయం) also known as Shanigaram Cheruvu is a medium irrigation project constructed across the Shanigaram River, at Shanigaram Village, Siddipet District, Telangana.

This is one of the oldest reservoir constructed in 1891 under Nizam rule. Project construction cost was 560 seers (504 kg) of gold.

As part of Sriram Sagar Stage-II work, this reservoir will be filled by lift canal from Thotapally Reservoir in which water carried from Mid Manair through MMD Right Canal. Both Reservoirs and MMD Right Canal construction is in progress,; it is expected to finish by end of 2015.

== See also ==
- Sriram Sagar Project
- Lower Manair Dam
- Mid Manair Dam
- Upper Manair Dam
- Sripada Yellampalli project
- Nizam Sagar
- Kaddam Project
- Pranahita Chevella
- Alisagar lift irrigation scheme
- Sri Komaram Bheem Project
- Icchampally Project
- Kaleshwaram Project
