= Saraswati Barrage =

- Annaram Barrage at Mahadevpur Mandal Saraswati Barrage (India)
- Location: Annaram (village), Mahadevpur Telangana
- Coordinates: 18°45′51.9″N 79°49′24.7″E
- Purpose: Multi-purpose
- Status: Operational
- Construction began: 2 May 2016
- Opening date: 21 June 2019
- Built by: Afcons Infrastructure Limited (Subsidiary of Shapoorji Pallonji Group)
- Owner: Government of Telangana
- Operators: Irrigation & CAD Department, Government of Telangana

Dam and spillways
- Type of dam: Barrage
- Impounds: Godavari River
- Length: 1,270 m (4,170 ft)
- Spillways: 66

Reservoir
- Creates: Saraswati Barrage
- Total capacity: 11.9 tmcft 336,970 megalitres

Power Station
- Operator: Telangana State Power Generation Corporation Limited
- Commission date: Planned
- Type: Barrage

The Saraswati Barrage, also known as the Annaram Barrage is an irrigation project on Godavari River located at Annaram Village, Mahadevpur Mandal, Jayashankar Bhupalpally district in Telangana State, India.

This is the second point and one of the barrages proposed in Kaleshwaram Lift Irrigation Project which envisages construction of three barrages between Yellampalli and Medigadda.

Proposed Annaram Barrage details:

Barrage	Bed level (m)	Pond Level (m)	Gross Storage (TMC)	Number of Gates
Annaram Barrage	107.0	120.0	11.9	66

== Project info ==
Annaram Barrage foundation was laid by First Chief Minister of Telangana, K.Chandrashekar Rao on 2 May 2016.

The project started by Telangana government as part of the Kaleshwaram Lift Irrigation Schema to irrigate the 18.5 lakh acres of new land and stabilize 11.8 lakh (1,118,000) acres (480,000 ha) of existing irrigated land.

== See also ==
- Medigadda Barrage
- Sundilla Barrage
- Sriram Sagar Project
- Lower Manair Dam
- Mid Manair Dam
- Kaddam Project
- Upper Manair Dam
- SRSP Flood Flow Canal
- Nizam Sagar
- Pranahita Chevella
- Alisagar lift irrigation scheme
- Sri Komaram Bheem Project
- Devadula lift irrigation scheme
- Icchampally Project
