= Janampet Barrage =

- Janampet Barrage at Pinapaka Janampet Barrage (India)
- Official name: Janampet Barrage
- Country: India
- Location: Pinapaka mandal of Bhadradri Kothagudem district
- Coordinates: 18°06′11″N 80°44′24″E
- Purpose: Multi-purpose
- Status: Proposed
- Construction cost: Proposed

Dam and spillways
- Type of dam: Barrage
- Impounds: Godavari River
- Height: 67 meters
- Length: 867.5 meters
- Elevation at crest: 57 meters
- Spillways: 49 (41 River Sluices and 8 Under Sluices)
- Spillway capacity: 73,630 Cumecs

Reservoir
- Creates: Janampet Reservoir
- Total capacity: 8.863 TMC
- Active capacity: 8.828 TMC
- Surface area: 6,327 hectares (15,630 acres)

Janampet Barrage was a proposed barrage (dam) across Godavari River with full pond level (FPL) 67m. It would have been located at Janampet village, Pinapaka, Bhadradri Kothagudem, India. This barrage was proposed as part of a proposal to link Godavari, Krishna, Penna and Cauvery rivers, which is part of Indian Rivers Interlinking Project. The barrage was indefinitely shelved in February 2021.

== History ==
As part of original alignment for Godavari - Krishna - Penna - Cauvery rivers linking, a dam was proposed as part of Icchampally Project, Telangana with a large reservoir and hydroelectric project.

Post 2014, there have been major developments in between Sriram Sagar Project and Icchampally site in Telangana. A slew of irrigation projects - Sripada Yellampalli Project and Kaleshwaram Lift Irrigation Project (Parvati Barrage, Saraswati Barrage and Lakshmi Barrage) have come up due to which a large reservoir is no longer feasible as it would lead to submergence of at-least two barrages (Saraswati and Lakshmi barrages) and their associated pump-houses (Saraswati and Lakshmi Pump-houses) which form part of Kaleshwaram Lift Irrigation Project. The construction of Icchampally Project now will lead to wasteful capital expenditure, spent as part of barrages and pump-houses under submergence. Only water pumps from pump-houses can be reused at another suitable location.

In 2019, Icchampally Project was revisited to evaluate feasibility of a dam with lowered height - referred to as Inchampalli Low Dam. This dam would have a full pond level (FPL) 95m, sill level 86m, and live storage capacity of 901 MCM (31.81 TMC). An FPL of 95m, would still lead to submergence of Lakshmi Barrage and its associated Lakshmi Pump-house as FPL is 6m above the crest level of Lakshmi Barrage. This dam with reduced height would only allow water transfer 298 TMC and this would be exhausted in the states of Telangana and Andhra Pradesh. It was found that water transfer to Tamil Nadu is not feasible through this route.

In lieu of Icchampally Project, a barrage was proposed at Janampet in Telangana. A study was conducted to find feasibility to transfer water from Godavari to Krishna basin, via both Open Canal and Piped systems.

In February 2021, Janampet barrage plans were shelved as Icchampally Project would benefit water stressed regions in Telangana as compared to Janampet barrage. As per Detailed Project Report, Inchampalli Low Dam with FPL of 87m will be constructed so as not to affect Kaleshwaram Lift Irrigation Project upstream and contain the submergence to river portion.
