= Lakshmi Barrage =

Medigadda Barrage
- Medigadda Barrage at Mahadevpur Mandal Medigadda Barrage (India)
- Location: Medigadda (village), Mahadevpur Telangana
- Coordinates: 18°42′13.8″N 80°05′21″E
- Purpose: Multi-purpose
- Status: Operational
- Construction began: 2 May 2016
- Opening date: 21 June 2019
- Construction cost: ₹1849 crores
- Built by: Larsen & Toubro
- Owner: Government of Telangana
- Operators: Irrigation & CAD Department, Government of Telangana

Dam and spillways
- Type of dam: Barrage
- Impounds: Godavari River
- Length: 1,632 m (5,354 ft)
- Spillways: 85
- Spillway capacity: 28.25 lakhs cusecs

Reservoir
- Creates: Medigadda Barrage
- Total capacity: 16 tmcft

Power Station
- Operator: Telangana State Power Generation Corporation Limited
- Commission date: Planned
- Type: Tidal barrage

The Medigadda Barrage is the starting point of the proposed Kaleshwaram Project which envisages construction of three barrages between Yellampally & Medigadda. Its objective is to utilize Godavari water for drinking and irrigation. The Barrage/Project site is located at Medigadda Village, Mahadevpur Mandal, Jayashankar Bhupalpally district in Telangana State, India.

Proposed Barrage Details:

Barrage	Bed Level (meters)	Pond Level (meters)	Gross Storage (in TMC)	Number of Gates
Medigadda Barrage	89.0	100.0	16.17	85

== Project info ==
A memorandum of understanding was signed by states of Maharashtra and Telangana, as part of which, Chanaka-Korata Barrage on Painganga River, Tummidihatti Barrage on Pranhita River and Lakshmi Barrage on Godavari River will be constructed.

Medigadda Barrage foundation was laid by First Chief Minister of Telangana, K.Chandrashekar Rao on 2 May 2016.

The project started by Telangana govt as part of the Kaleshwaram Lift Irrigation Schema to irrigate the 1,850,000 acres (750,000 ha) of new land and stabilize the 1,180,000 acres (480,000 ha) of existing irrigated land.

== Incidents ==
Medigadda Barrage part of Kaleshwaram Lift Irrigation Schema, on 14-15 July 2022 barrage received (28.8 Lakhs cusecs) flood more than its designed discharge capacity (28.25 lakhs cusecs), it was crossed 500 years record. Motors in the Kannepally lift station got submerged.

Barrage again sank due to reported heavy inflow on the night of Saturday October 21, 2023. Engineering staff reported that pillar number 19 of 1.6 km barrage suffered damage causing a portion of bridge to sag. Apart from pillar 19, pillar 20 and 21 also developed cracks.

One year later, the damaged barrage was still stuck in limbo. A six-member committee of the National Dam Safety Authority (NDSA) visited the barrage on October 24, 2024, and submitted a report to the government stating that the barrage had suffered damages due to defects in planning, design, quality, control and management.

== See also ==
- Sriram Sagar Project
- Annaram Barrage
- Sundilla Barrage
- Lower Manair Dam
- Mid Manair Dam
- Kaddam Project
- Upper Manair Dam
- SRSP Flood Flow Canal
- Nizam Sagar
- Pranahita Chevella
- Alisagar lift irrigation scheme
- Sri Komaram Bheem Project
- Devadula lift irrigation scheme
- Icchampally Project
