= Kaleshwaram Lift Irrigation Project =

Dam in Kaleshwaram, Bhupalpally, Telangana, India

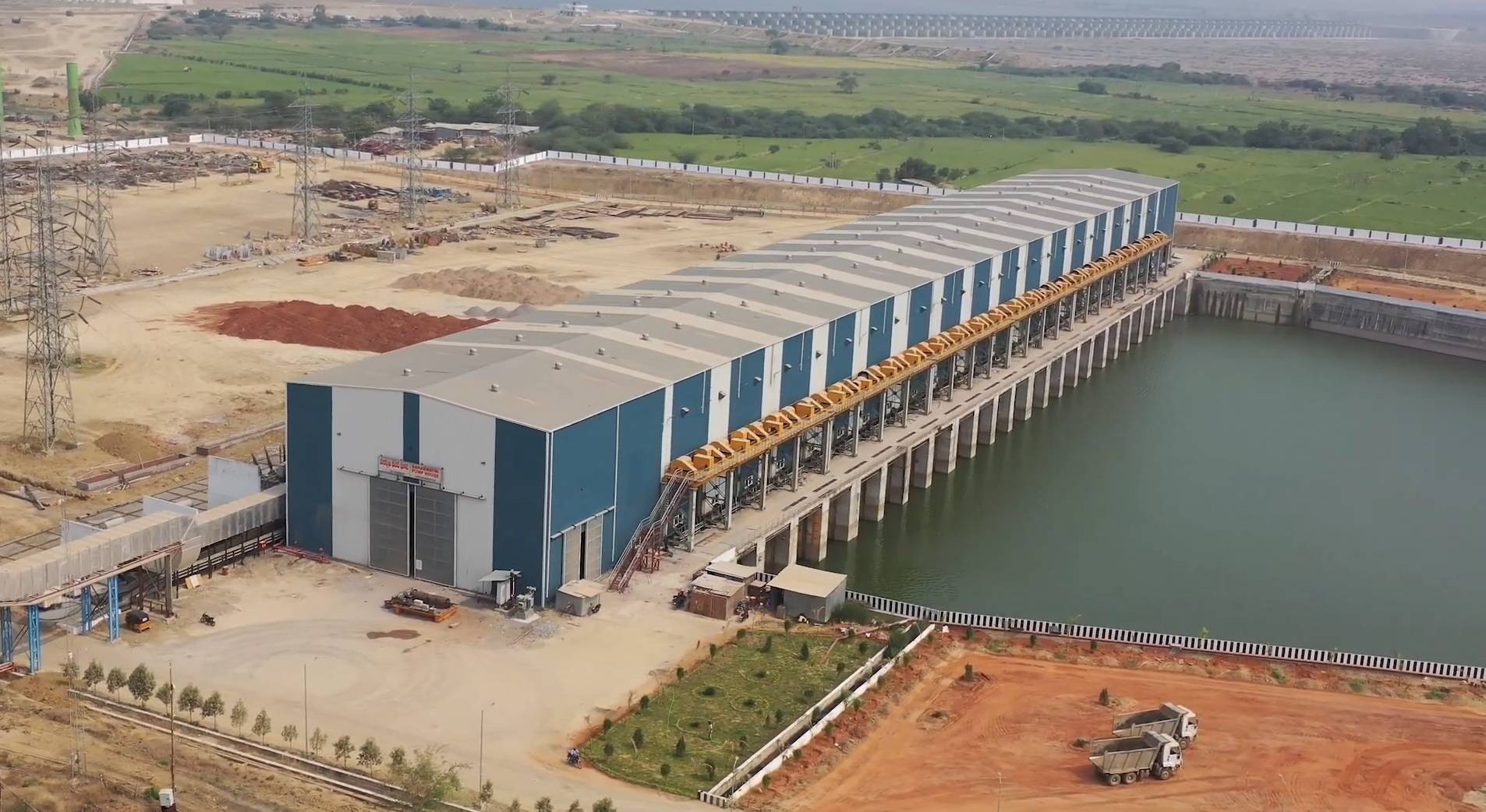
- Lakshmi pumphouse of the project

- Location within India Location within Telangana
- Location: Kaleshwaram, Bhupalpally, Telangana, India
- Coordinates: 18°47′16″N 79°55′27″E
- Purpose: Irrigation, power, and transport
- Status: Completed/Inaugurated
- Construction began: 2 May 2016
- Opening date: 21 June 2019
- Construction cost: ₹ 80,190 crores
- Operator: Telangana Irrigation Department

Dam and spillways
- Impounds: Godavari River
- Height: up to top of earth dam above the lowest river bed.
- Spillway type: Chute spillway
- Spillway capacity: 28.25 lakhs cusecs

The Kaleshwaram Lift Irrigation Project (KLIP) is a multi-purpose irrigation project on the Godavari River in Kaleshwaram, Bhupalpally, Telangana, India. Currently the world's largest multi-stage lift irrigation project, its farthest upstream influence is at the confluence of the Pranahita and Godavari rivers. The Pranahita River is itself a confluence of various smaller tributaries including the Wardha, Painganga, and Wainganga rivers which combine to form the seventh-largest drainage basin on the subcontinent, with an estimated annual discharge of more than 6,427,900 acre-feet (7,930 cubic hectometres) or 280 TMC. It remains untapped as its course is principally through dense forests and other ecologically sensitive zones such as wildlife sanctuaries.

The Kaleshwaram Lift Irrigation Project is divided into 7 links and 28 packages spanning a distance of approximately 500 km (310 mi) through 13 districts and utilizing a canal network of more than 1,800 km (1,100 mi). The project aims to produce a total of 240 TMC (195 from Medigadda Barrage, 20 from Sripada Yellampalli project and 25 from groundwater), of which 169 has been allocated for irrigation, 30 for Hyderabad municipal water, 16 for miscellaneous industrial uses and 10 for drinking water in nearby villages, with the remainder being estimated evaporation loss. The project aims at increasing total culturable command area (the sustainable area which can be irrigated after accounting for both upstream and downstream factors) by 1,825,000 acre⋅ft (2,251 hm^{3}) across all 13 districts in addition to stabilizing the existing CCA.

On 21 June 2019, the project was opened by Telangana Governor E. S. L. Narasimhan and Chief minister K. Chandrashekar Rao. National Green Tribunal declared the Scheme is constructed without following the statuary provisions with regard to environmental aspects.

Four major pumping facilities manage the project's outflow, the largest at Ramadugu (Medaram, Annaram and Sundilla being the others) is also likely to be the largest in Asia once consistent measurements are available, requiring seven 140 MWh (500 GJ) pumps designed and manufactured specifically for the project by the BHEL. The Engineering giant Megha Engineering and Infrastructures Limited built 15 of 22 Pump houses and undertook major part of the project.

== Project details ==
In addition to constructing new reservoirs, Kaleshwaram also rejuvenates existing ones. Mallanna Sagar reservoir was inaugurated in February 2022. It is one of the biggest artificial reservoirs in India, and was constructed with a capacity of 50 tmcft.

=== Existing reservoirs ===
Reservoir	Location	Capacity (in Tmcft)
Sripada Yellampalli project	Yellampalli village	20.175
Lower Manair Dam		24
Mid Manair Dam		25.875
Upper Manair Dam		2.20
Kaddam Project		7.60
Masani Tank		0.13
Total		55.98

=== New reservoirs ===
Reservoir	Location	Capacity (in Tmcft)	FRL(in m)
Medigadda Barrage		16.17	100.0
Annaram Barrage	Annaram	10.87	120.0
Sundilla Barrage		8.83	130.0
Medaram Online storage	Medaram	0.78	
Ananthagiri Online storage	Ananthagiri	3.50	
Sri Ranganayaka Sagar	Imambad (chandlapur)	3.50	
Sri Komaravelli Mallanna Sagar	Tadkapally	50.00	
Malkapet Online storage		3.0	
Konda Pochamma Online storage	Pamulaparthy	15.00	
Amarlabanda Online storage		5.00	
Katchapur		2.50	
Thimmakka Palli		3.00	
Issaipet		2.50	
Bhoompally Online storage		9.0	
Gujjal Online storage		1.50	
Katewadi Online storage		5.00	
Mothe Online storage		2.90	
Kondem Cheruvu		3.50	
Gandamalla Online storage		9.87	
Baswapuram Online storage		11.39	
TOTAL		147.710	

=== Links & Irrigated Command Area/Ayacut (Acres) ===
- Link-I: From Medigadda Barrage on Godavari River to Sripada Yellampalli Project (30,000 acres)
- Link-II: From Sripada Yellampalli Project to Mid Manair Dam
- Link-III: From Mid Manair Dam to Upper Manair Reservoir (86,150 acres)
- Link-IV: From upper Manair Dam to Konda Pochamma Reservoir (595,754 acres)
- Link-V: From Anicut to Chityala (243,500 acres)
- Link-VI: From Sri Komaravelli Mallanna Sagar to Singur Dam (280,296 acres)
- Link-VII: From SRSP Foreshore to Nizam Sagar Canals and to Dilawarpur and Hangarga village for Nirmal and Mudhole Constituency (590,000 acres)

Total: 1,65,700 acres (New ayacut) Apart from: 1,875,00+ acres (Stabilisation of existing ayacut)

=== Gravity Canals & Tunnels for distribution ===
1. Gravity Canal - 1,531 km

2. Gravity Tunnel - 203 km

3. Pressure Mains / Delivery Mains - 98 km

Link-I: From Medigadda Barrage on Godavari River to Sripada Yellampalli Project

Water will be reverse pumped from the confluence point of Godavari and Pranahita Rivers to Sripada Yellampalli Project with the help of 3 barrages (Medigadda, Annaram and Sundilla) and 3 lifts.

As of June 2019, lifts are being commissioned with provision to lift 2 TMC (56,63,36,93,184 liters) of water per day from Medigadda. The water is lifted to backwaters of Annaram barrage. Again from Annaram barrage to Sundilla barrage. Finally from Sundilla to Sripada Yellampalli Project. Civil works are being executed to lift 3 TMC per day but pumps are being installed to lift only 2 TMC. If need be, only pumps would need to be installed to increase capacity by one more TMC.

Link-II: From Sripada Yellampalli Project to Mid Manair Dam

A new balancing reservoir is also being proposed in the outskirts of Hyderabad of 20–30 TMC to store water. The water will be supplied to this balancing reservoir in the same link.

Link-V: From Anicut to Chityala

From Anicut, a series of gravity canals and a small tunnel of 1.2 km are planned to transfer water to Gandamalla Reservoir and Baswapuram Reservoir. Thereafter, gravity canals are planned towards Chityal Mandal and its villages.

Link-VI: From Sri Komaravelli Mallanna Sagar to Singur Dam

From Sri Komaravelli Mallanna Sagar, another sequence of gravity canals, tunnels and lifts are used to transfer water to Singur Dam. Apart from that, if need be, water can be transferred to Nizam Sagar Project and from there, to SRSP.

Link-VII: From SRSP Foreshore to Nizam Sagar Canals and to Dilwarpur and Hangarga village for Nirmal and Mudhole Constituency

From the foreshore waters of SRSP, water will be transferred to reservoirs at Hangarga and Dilwapur villages. Apart from this, existing reservoirs like Masani Tank and kondem Cheruvu will also be linked. Canals under Nizam Sagar will also be irrigated.

== Water lifting ==
The chief minister has said that every year about 400 TMC of water will be lifted.

== Project Economics ==
The project requires about 8459 MW of electricity to run its several large water pumps. Assuming, on average, the pumps require constant running for two months during the monsoon period, 24 hours a day, the total electricity consumption would be 849 crore units. Taking a unit electricity charge of Rs. 8.0 per kWh, the annual electricity cost is going to be Rs. 10,647 crores per year. Assuming the project irrigates about 15 lakh acres, the electricity cost for irrigation is about Rs. 46,666 per acre per year. The chief minister has said that the project requires about Rs. 5000 crore annually for electricity charges. On the other hand, the state irrigation department had allocated Rs.7000 crores for electricity charges in its 2020 budget.

The project was mainly funded with the money obtained through loans. Assuming an existing loan of Rs. 80,000 crore, at an interest rate of 6% that needs to paid up over a period of 30 years, the annual loan repayment charge is about Rs. 5760 crores per year. This implies an additional charge of Rs. 38,400 per acre per year towards the loan repayment. Therefore, the total cost of irrigation per acre is approximately Rs. 85,000 per acre per year. On the other hand, the net profit from the cultivation of the main crop i.e., paddy, could be expected to be around Rs.40,000 per acre per year, assuming two crops in a year. These numbers raise questions about the financial viability of the project.

A recent report by the comptroller and auditor general of India (CAG) has pointed out that the cost to benefit ratio of the project is 1:0.75 in contrast to the state govt.'s claim of 1:1.5. In addition, by taking in to account the escalated costs for lifting the third TMC, the ratio comes down to 1:0.52. According to the report, the annual operational costs for irrigating an acre of land is Rs. 46,364 cr. The annual electricity costs are estimated to be Rs. 10,374 cr. Despite the negative report by CAG on the financial viability, the state govt. has made no effort refute the report.

== Project Execution ==
Indian Public sector Enterprise BHEL is executing this project and has already commissioned 16 pumping units.

== Environmental law violations ==
In October 2020, the National Green Tribunal, India's court for environmental issues, directed the Telangana government to halt work on the KLIP except the drinking water supply component. A petition had been filed by a farmer from Siddipet district, whose land was affected by the KLIP. The National Green Tribunal found, on hearing his petition, that the environmental clearances for the KLIP had not been obtained before the project, as is required by law, but had been granted by the Union Government of India after work on the project had already begun by the Telangana government. The National Green Tribunal has directed the Indian government's Ministry of Environment, Forests and Climate Change to constitute a committee to investigate the illegally granted clearances, and to file a report with them within six months.

Kaleshwaram Lift Irrigation Project Details PDF.

== See also ==
- Lower Manair Dam
- Palamuru-Rangareddy Lift Irrigation Scheme
- SRSP Flood Flow Canal
- R. Vidyasagar Rao Dindi Lift Irrigation Scheme
- Ganga Water Lift Project
- Pranahita Chevella
- Alisagar lift irrigation scheme
- Sri Komaram Bheem Project
- Devadula lift irrigation scheme
- Icchampally Project
- Colorado River Aqueduct
- Nizam Sagar
- Singur Dam
