= Mid Manair Dam =

- Location within Telangana Location within India
- Official name: Mid Manair Dam
- Location: Manwada Village, Rajanna Sircilla district, Telangana, India
- Coordinates: 18°23′34″N 78°57′40″E
- Construction began: 2005
- Opening date: 2018; 8 years ago

Dam and spillways
- Impounds: Manair River and SRSP Flood Flow Canal
- Height: 45 metres (148 ft) from river level
- Length: 388 metres (1,273 ft)

Reservoir
- Creates: Mid Manair Reservoir
- Total capacity: 25.873 Tmcft
- Active capacity: 21~Tmcft

Mid Manair Dam is a major irrigation project across the Manair River, at Manwada Village, Boinpalli Mandal, Rajanna Sircilla district, Telangana. It has a capacity of 25.87 tmcft with 25 radial gates. It has a capacity to irrigate 200,000 acres. It is part of the prestigious Kaleshwaram project from which 2-3 tmcft water will be lifted and router to Mid Manair Dam. The project was completed in April 2018.

== History ==
The balancing reservoir initiated as part of SRSP stage-II for which the foundation stone was laid by the former Prime Minister P. V. Narasimha Rao in 1991. The surplus water from Sriram Sagar Project flows through the SRSP Flood Flow Canal (SRSP FFC) into the Mid Manair Dam as well as Manair River water. Once the dam reaches full capacity, water is released into the Lower Manair Dam, a major balancing reservoir at Karimnagar city with 24Tmcft Gross Capacity.

Dam construction was started in 2004-05 as part of Jalayagnam, but was delayed due to the several political reasons.

130 km long Flood Flow Canal construction work was completed before the Mid Manair Dam. While the dam was under construction, the released water from the Flood Flow Canal head regulator flowed to the Lower Manair Dam.

For the project completion, it took 10 years to complete 50% work, and 10 months to complete the rest 50% in April 2018. The final cost for completing the project was ₹2050 crores.

== The Reservoir ==
The Gross Capacity of the reservoir is 25.873 Tmcft. The Left Bank Canal 22 km to irrigate 9,500 acres. The Right Bank Canal 64 km to irrigate 90,500 acres. From June 2018, the Kaleshwaram project feeds the Mid-Manair Reservoir with the Godavari water and stabilizes the ayacut via existing projects.

== Earth dam breach ==
On 25 September 2016, flood water flowed over the incomplete earth dam of the project and breached the earth dam inundating the downstream areas. Few villages were evacuated to save from water inundation. It was planned to store 3 tmcft water in the project to facilitate water supply under SRSP (stage-II) and Kaleshwaram Lift Irrigation Project. It is not possible to supply water from the project till the earth dam is reconstructed. The project planning and its execution is blamed for the dam breach which has not constructed the earth dam to adequate level in comparison with the adjacent concrete spill way to safely pass the normal flood water without over topping the earth dam.

== Submerged villages ==
- Anupuram (Vemulawada)
- Arepalli (Vemulawada)
- Kodmunja (Vemulawada)
- Rudravaram (Vemulawada)
- Sankepalli (Vemulawada)
- Kodurupaka (Boinapalli)
- Manwada (Boinapalli)
- Neelojipalli (Boinapalli)
- Sabhashpalli (Boinapalli)
- Varadavelli (Boinapalli)
- Cheerlavancha (Thangalapally)
- Chintalthana (Thangalapally)
- Gurravanipalli (Ilanthakunta)
- Kandikatkur (Ilanthakunta)
- Obulapuram (Ilanthakunta)

== See also ==
- Sriram Sagar Project
- Lower Manair Dam
- Upper Manair Dam
- Sripada Yellampalli project
- Medigadda Barrage
- Annaram Barrage
- Sundilla Barrage
- Nizam Sagar
- Kaddam Project
- Pranahita Chevella
- Alisagar lift irrigation scheme
- Sri Komaram Bheem Project
- Icchampally Project
