= Parvati Barrage =

Dam in Telangana, India

- Sundilla(Parvati) Barrage at Manthani Mandal Parvati Barrage (India)
- Location: Kasipeta village, Manthani Mandal.
- Coordinates: 18°44′08.6″N 79°36′39.6″E
- Purpose: Multi-purpose
- Status: Operational
- Construction began: 2 May 2016
- Opening date: 21 June 2019
- Built by: Navayuga Engineering Company Limited
- Owner: Government of Telangana
- Operators: Irrigation & CAD Department, Government of Telangana

Dam and spillways
- Type of dam: Barrage
- Impounds: Godavari River
- Length: 74 gates
- Spillways: 41

Reservoir
- Creates: Parvati Barrage
- Total capacity: 8.83 tmcft

Power Station
- Operator: Telangana State Power Generation Corporation Limited
- Commission date: Planned
- Type: Barrage

The Parvati Barrage, also known as the Sundilla Barrage, is an irrigation project located at Kasipeta Village, Manthani Mandal, Peddapalli district in Telangana State, India.

This is one of the three barrages proposed in Kaleshwaram Project which envisages construction of three barrages between Yellampalli (Ramagundam) and Medigadda.

Proposed Sundilla Barrage details:

Barrage	Bed level (m)	Pond Level (m)	Gross Storage (TMC)	Number of Gates
Sundilla Barrage	118.0	130.0	8.83	74

Nearby areas are Godavarikhani (15km), Manthani (15km) and Sundilla (15km). It is surrounded by Jaipur Mandal towards the north, Ramagundam(Godavarikhani) Mandal towards the west, Manthani Mandal towards the south, and Mancherial Mandal towards the north.

Ramagundam, Godavari khani, Mancherial, Peddapalli, Manthani, Jaipur are nearby cities and towns. It is on the border of the Peddapalle District and Mancherial District. Mancherial District Jaipur is North towards this place. This project is equidistant from Godavarikhani and Manthani bus stations. The nearest railway station is Ramagundam. The nearest airport is Ramagundam (Basant Nagar).

Sundilla Barrage is named after Sundilla Village, which is a small village with nearly 1200 population in Ramagiri mandal of Peddapalli district.

== Project info ==
Sundilla Barrage foundation was laid by First Chief Minister of Telangana, K.Chandrashekar Rao on 2 May 2016.

The project started by Telangana government as part of the Kaleshwaram Lift Irrigation Schema to irrigate the 740,000 hectares (1,800,000 acres) of new land and stabilize the 740,000 hectares (1,800,000 acres) of existing irrigated land.

== See also ==
- Medigadda Barrage
- Annaram Barrage
- Lower Manair Dam
- Mid Manair Dam
- Kaddam Project
- Upper Manair Dam
- SRSP Flood Flow Canal
- Pranahita Chevella
- Alisagar lift irrigation scheme
- Sri Komaram Bheem Project
- Icchampally Project
