= Sripada Yellampalli Project =

Irrigation project in Telangana, India

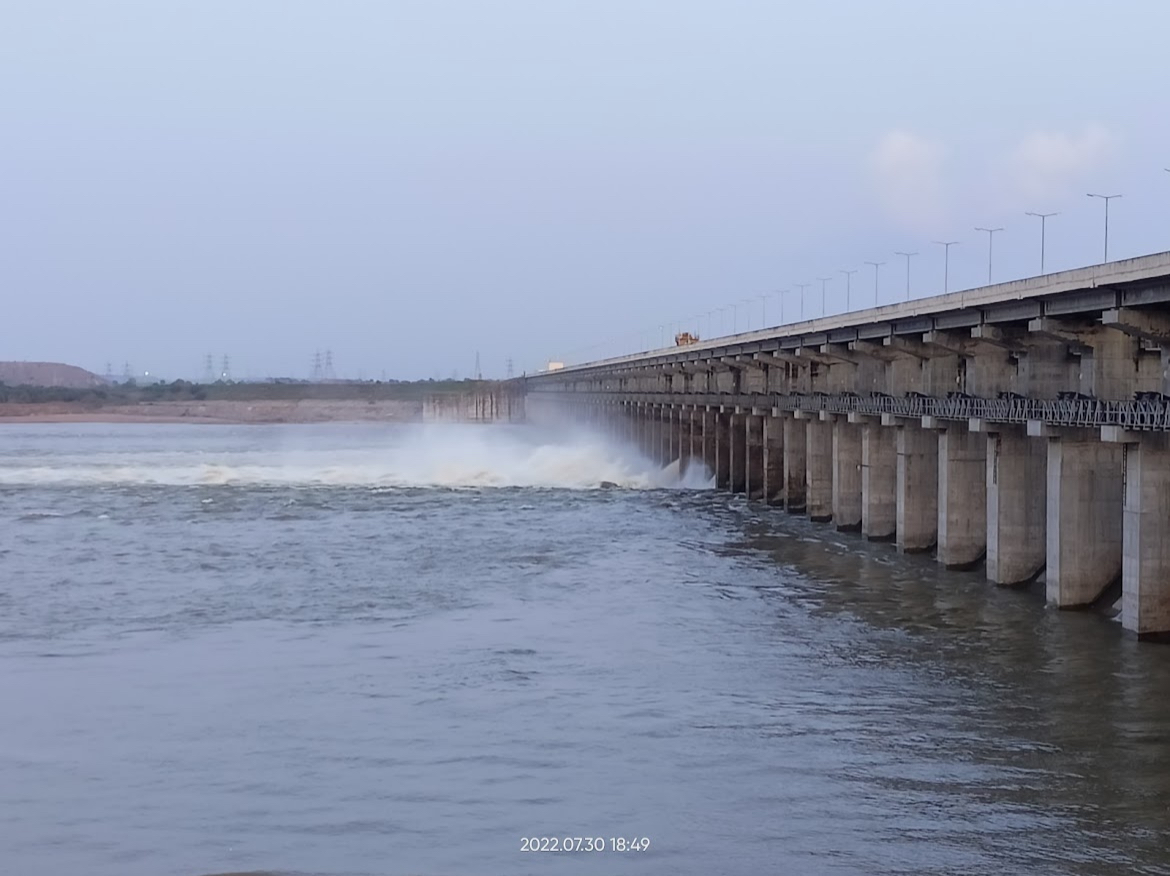

- Yellampalli Barrage at Ramagundam Mandal Sripada Yellampalli Project (India)
- Location: Yellampalli (village), Peddapalli & Mancherial districts
- Coordinates: 18°50′45″N 79°22′05″E
- Purpose: Multi-purpose (Ntpc Ramagundam power plant uses and supplies drinking water to Ramagundam Godavarikhani and Hyderabad cities
- Status: Functional
- Construction began: 28 July 2004
- Opening date: 4 August 2016; 9 years ago
- Construction cost: 5400 crore rupees
- Owner: Government of Telangana

Dam and spillways
- Type of dam: Barrage
- Impounds: Godavari River
- Height: 26.3 m (86 ft)
- Length: 1,180.7 m (3,874 ft)
- Spillways: 62

Reservoir
- Creates: Yellampalli
- Total capacity: 20 tmcft

Power Station
- Operator: Telangana State
- Commission date: 2004
- Type: Barrage
- Website https://irrigation.telangana.gov.in

Sripada Yellampalli Project is an irrigation project located at Yellampalli Village of Ramagundam rural Mandal, between Peddapalli district - Mancherial District of Telangana State, India. The project is fourth largest on the Godavari River in Telangana State. It is named after late legislator, D. Sripada Rao.

== Project info ==
Sripada Yellampalli irrigation project foundation was laid by Former Chief Minister of Andhra Pradesh, Y. S. Rajasekhara Reddy on 28 July 2004.

The project is designed to utilize about 63 tmc of water at a cost of Rs. 900 crores in the first phase. In the second phase, about 49.5 tmc would be lifted to the upland regions of Karimnagar, Adilabad, Nizamabad, Warangal and Medak districts with 6 TMC water allotted for the NTPC Ramagundam project. After the flood gates are installed, the project could would store about 20 Tmcft of water.

The project operational requirement is 163 MW power and 469 million KWh of electrical energy annually to pump the water. The project would supply water for NTPC power project reservoir in Ramagundam Mandal in Karimnagar old district (Peddapalli district). It commenced its operations in 2005 near Mamnoor and Yellampalli villages at Ramagundam and mainly supplies drinking water to Ramagundam, Godavarikhani cities and Hyderabad Capital city.

== See also ==
- Sriram Sagar Project
- Medigadda Barrage
- Annaram Barrage
- Sundilla Barrage
- Lower Manair Dam
- Mid Manair Dam
- Kaddam Project
- Upper Manair Dam
- SRSP Flood Flow Canal
- Nizam Sagar
- Pranahita Chevella
- Alisagar lift irrigation scheme
- Maulana Abul Kalam Hyderabad Sujala Saravanthi scheme
- Sri Komaram Bheem Project
- Devadula lift irrigation scheme
- Icchampally Project
