= Tummidihetti Barrage =

- Tummidihetti Barrage at Tummidihetti Tummidihetti Barrage (India)
- Official name: Tummidihetti Barrage
- Country: India
- Location: Tummidihetti village, Koutala mandal, Adilabad district, Telangana
- Coordinates: 19°35′45″N 79°47′0″E
- Purpose: Multi-purpose
- Status: Proposed
- Construction began: Proposed
- Opening date: Proposed
- Construction cost: Proposed
- Built by: Proposed
- Owner: Government of Telangana
- Operators: Irrigation & CAD Department, Government of Telangana

Dam and spillways
- Type of dam: Barrage
- Impounds: Pranhita River a tributary of Godavari River
- Height: 148 m (486 ft)
- Length: 6,477 m (21,250 ft)
- Spillway capacity: 62,231.27 Cumecs

Reservoir
- Creates: Tummidihetti Reservoir
- Total capacity: 2 TMC (Estimated).

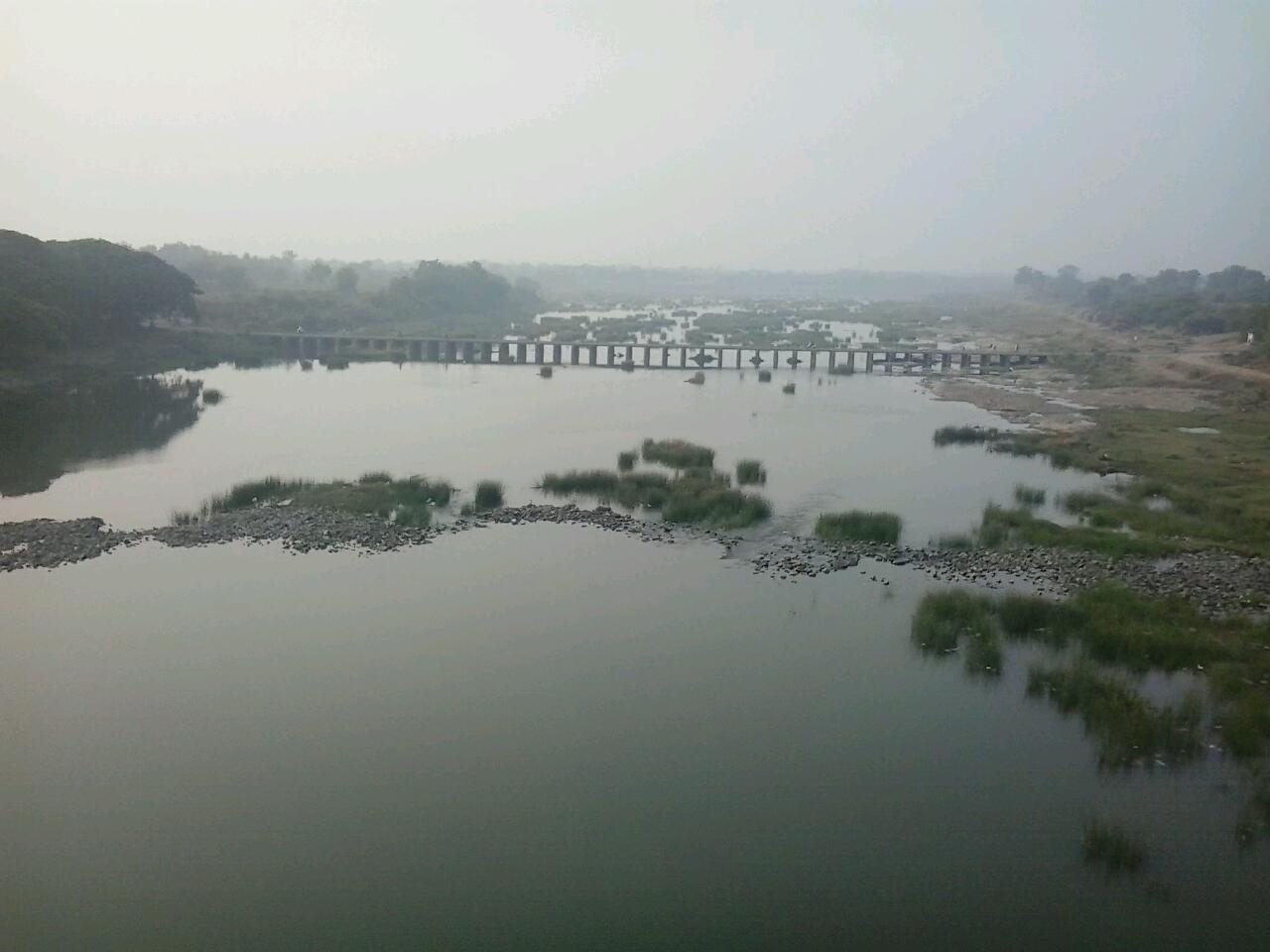
Wardha River in Pulgaon

Tummidihetti Barrage is a proposed barrage across Pranhita River, a tributary of Godavari River at Tummidihetti village, Koutala mandal, Adilabad district of Telangana State. The project will provide irrigation facilities for an ayacut of 2,00,000 acres in drought prone areas in East Adilabad District of Telangana State. .

== History ==
This barrage was earlier proposed as part of Pranahita Chevella lift irrigation scheme, to divert water via Gravity to Sripada Yellampalli project and thereafter via series of lifts which would culminate at Chevella; while providing irrigation facilities and drinking water to villages en route. The project could not come to fruition due to large scale submergence in the state of Maharashtra and the Government of Maharashtra not agreeing to an FRL of +152 meters. The canal work was undertaken between Tummidihetti Barrage and Sripada Yellampalli project, even though consent from the state of Maharashtra was not taken for barrage headworks for +152 meters FRL.

In 2016, the Government of Telangana and Government of Maharashtra signed an inter-state agreement with Maharashtra consenting to Tummidihetti Barrage at an FRL of +148 meters. Pranahita Chevella lift irrigation scheme, thereafter was also redesigned as Kaleshwaram Lift Irrigation Project and Dr. B.R. Ambedkar Pranahita Project

Dr. B.R. Ambedkar Pranahita Project will divert water with the help of Tummidihetti Barrage and contemplates to provide Irrigation facilities for an ayacut of 2,00,000 Acres in drought prone areas in East Adilabad District of Telangana State. The Package wise details of ayacut are as follows:

S.No	Mandal	Proposed Area (Acres)	Additional Ayacut (Acres)	Total Area (Acres)
1. Chennur (Assembly constituency)
A	Chennur	15215	-	15215
B	Kotapally	13357	-	13357
C	Jaipur	2928	-	2928
	Sub total	31500		31500
2. Bellampalli (Assembly constituency)
A	Vemanpally	3810		3810
B	Nennel	690	19556	20246
C	Tandur	-	19700	19700
	Bheemini	-	21500	21500
	Bellampally	-	7870	7870
	Sub total	4500	68626	73126
3. Sirpur (Assembly constituency)
A	Kowtala	1320	12452	13772
B	Dahegaon	88880	10400	19280
C	Bejjur	10300	13700	24000
	Sub total	4500	68626	73126
4. Asifabad (Assembly constituency)
A	Rebbena	-	38830	38830
	Sub total		38830	38830
	Total	56500	144008	200508
