= Sadarmat Barrage =

- Sadarmat Barrage at Ponkal Sadarmat Barrage (India)
- Official name: Sadarmat Barrage
- Country: India
- Location: Ponkal village, Mamda mandal, Nirmal district, Telangana
- Coordinates: 18°59′27.9852″N 78°34′16.0104″E
- Purpose: Irrigation
- Status: Under construction
- Construction began: 11 January 2017
- Opening date: 2021
- Construction cost: 520 Crores
- Built by: Bhrunda Infra Private Limited & Siri Constructions Infrastructure Private Limited (Joint Venture)
- Owner: Government of Telangana
- Operators: Irrigation & CAD Department, Government of Telangana

Dam and spillways
- Type of dam: Barrage
- Impounds: Godavari River
- Spillways: 55 gates

Reservoir
- Creates: Sadarmat Reservoir
- Total capacity: 1.6 TMC

Sadarmat Barrage is an under-construction barrage across Godavari River at Ponkal village, Mamda mandal, Nirmal district of Telangana State. This barrage is situated 32 km downstream of Sriram Sagar Project, on the Godavari river and about 7 km upstream of Sadarmat Anicut. The project will provide irrigation facilities for an ayacut of 20,000 acres in Nirmal district of Telangana State.

== History ==
In 1891 under the rule of Prime Minister of Hyderabad, Viqar-ul-Umra, Sadarmat Anicut was constructed by the French engineer JJ Ottley at Khanapur mandal in the erstwhile Adilabad district. It's a masonry structure with 2 meters height with a length of 437.4 metres on the left flank and 23.8 metres on the right flank. The estimated cost for construction, then, was about 1 Lakh Indian rupees.

The Sadarmat Anicut has no reliable storage and thus agricultural lands can be irrigated only when there are flows from upper stretches of Godavari river. Sadarmat Barrage will create a pondage of 1.6 TMC, which will create additional ayacut of 20,000 acres as well as stabilise the existing ayacut of 18,000 acres under Sadarmat Anicut.

The foundation stone for construction of the barrage was laid by the Irrigation Minister for Telangana, T. Harish Rao with an estimated construction cost of 520 crores on January 11, 2021.

As part of Sri Ram Sagar Project (SRSP) Rejuvenation Scheme, three house pumps will lift 60 TMC water from the Kaleshwaram Lift Irrigation Project and fill the Sriram Sagar Project in 69 days, through SRSP Flood Flow Canal. Water from Sriram Sagar Project can be released to Sadarmat Barrage and Sadarmat Anicut via Gravity as it is situated at the downstream of the project. This will provide reliable water supply to ayacut of Sadarmat Barrage and Sadarmat Anicut, even during the drought season in the upper stretches of Godavari.
