= Maulana Abul Kalam Hyderabad Sujala Saravanthi scheme =

The Maulana Abul Kalam Hyderabad Sujala Saravanthi scheme is a drinking water project in Hyderabad on the Godavari River. It is expected to start by December 2013. It draws water through the Yellampalli project.

== The Project ==
The total pipeline length is 186 km. It passes through the Karimnagar, Medak and Ranga Reddy districts at an expected cost of 3375 crores.
