= Ganga Water Supply Scheme =

Drinking water project in Bihar, India

Ganga Water Lift Project

Location
- Country: India
- State: Bihar
- Coordinates: 25°21′57″N 85°59′14″E

Technical information
- Length: 151 km (94 mi)

Ganga Water Lift Project (गंगाजल उद्वह परियोजना (Hindi)) is a multi-phase drinking water project in Bihar, India. It is the ambitious project of Chief Minister of Bihar, Nitish Kumar to supply safe drinking water to the water-alarmed towns like Gaya, Rajgir and Nawada, located in southern part of the state through pipeline by lifting water from Ganga river near Hathidah Ghat in Mokama in Patna district. The cost of first phase of this project was initially approved with ₹2,836 crore (US$290 million), the cost was later revised to ₹4,174 crore (US$430 million). Government of Bihar approved the first phase of the coveted Ganga Water Lift Scheme (GWLS) of Water Resource Department (WRD) in December 2019. Ganga Water Lift Project is part of Nitish Kumar's ‘Jal-Jivan-Hariyali Abhiyan' which is aimed to minimize the bad effects of climate change.

== Project details ==
The total length of pipeline that supply Ganga waters to three towns is 190.90 km. The Ganga water is lifted near Hathidah Ghat in Mokama and the pipeline crosses alongside the national highways and state highways. The main pipeline runs from Hathidah to Giriyak via Sarmera and Barbigha. From Giriyak, one pipeline goes to Rajgir, while another to Nawada. The water from Ganga is brought to Motnaje water treatment plant in Nawada district through a pipeline. In Gaya, urban development & housing department (UDHD) will ensure supply of water to the households through pipeline. The Public health & engineering department (PHED) will be responsible for Ganga water supply in Nawada. The length of the pipeline on Hathidah-Motnaje-Tetar-Abgilla pipe route is 150 km.

Third pipeline goes to Manpur (near Gaya) via Vanganga, Tapovan and Jethia. A major water storage point is constructed near Manpur. Similar storage point is to be constructed for other towns too. The project is completed in three phases. Ganga water will be supplied to Gaya, Bodhgaya and Rajgir in the first phase of the project. Nawada town would be covered in the second phase.

Hyderabad-based infrastructure firm Megha Engineering & Infrastructures Ltd (MEIL) completed phase 1 of Ganga Water Lift Project in 2022.

== See also ==
- Kaleshwaram Lift Irrigation Project
- Colorado River Aqueduct
