= Sarala Sagar Project =

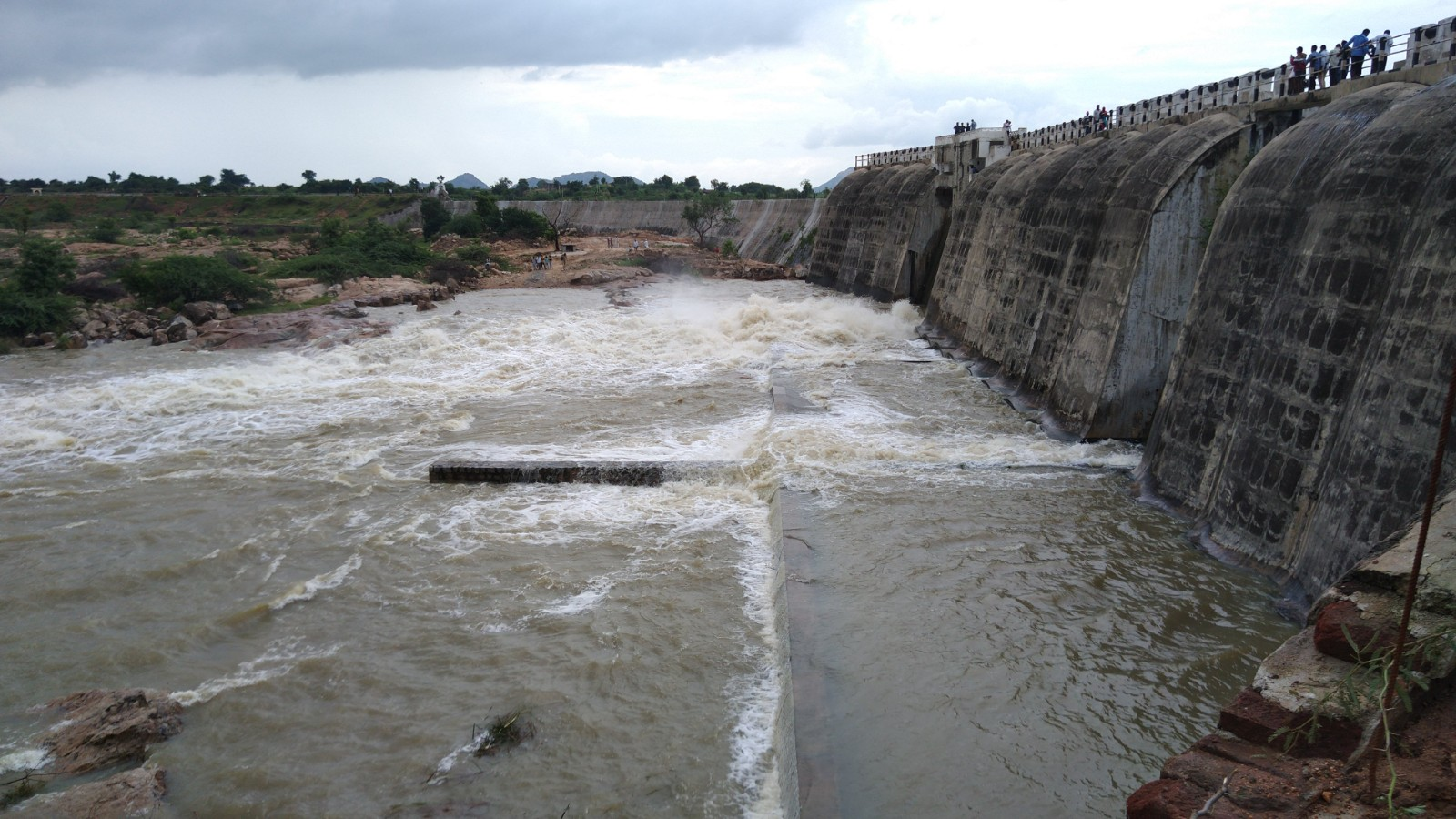

- Location within Telangana Location within India
- Location: Shankarampeta, Wanaparthy district, Telangana, India
- Coordinates: 16.412°N 77.899°E
- Construction began: 15 September 1949
- Opening date: 1959

Dam and spillways
- Impounds: Irrigation project from River Krishna

Sarala Sagar is located in Wanaparthy District, Telangana, India, 7 km (4.3 mi) away from National Highway 44.

== History ==
Sarala Sagar Project is the second biggest dam in Asia with siphon technology. It is the oldest project in India after independence Raja of Wanaparthy Raja Rameshwara Rao founded by the Sarala Sagar Dam Project that has incorporated siphon technology from California, United States. 1949 project was inaugurated by the military former Governor of Hyderabad General J.N Chowdary. The project construction stopped 9 years due to some unknown reasons and was later resumed in 1959. Presently this project provides irrigating a vast area of 4,182 Acres of agricultural land in the Wanaparthy district.

== The project ==
Sarala sagar Dam capacity is 0.5 tmcft. Construction of the dam was started on September 15, 1949. Most of the catchment area upstream of this dam is located in Mahabubnagar. Telangana Government has taken priority to construct Mission Kakatiya Phase-III work Rs 2.30 crore for desilting and repair of guide walls of the sarala sagar.

== Gallery ==
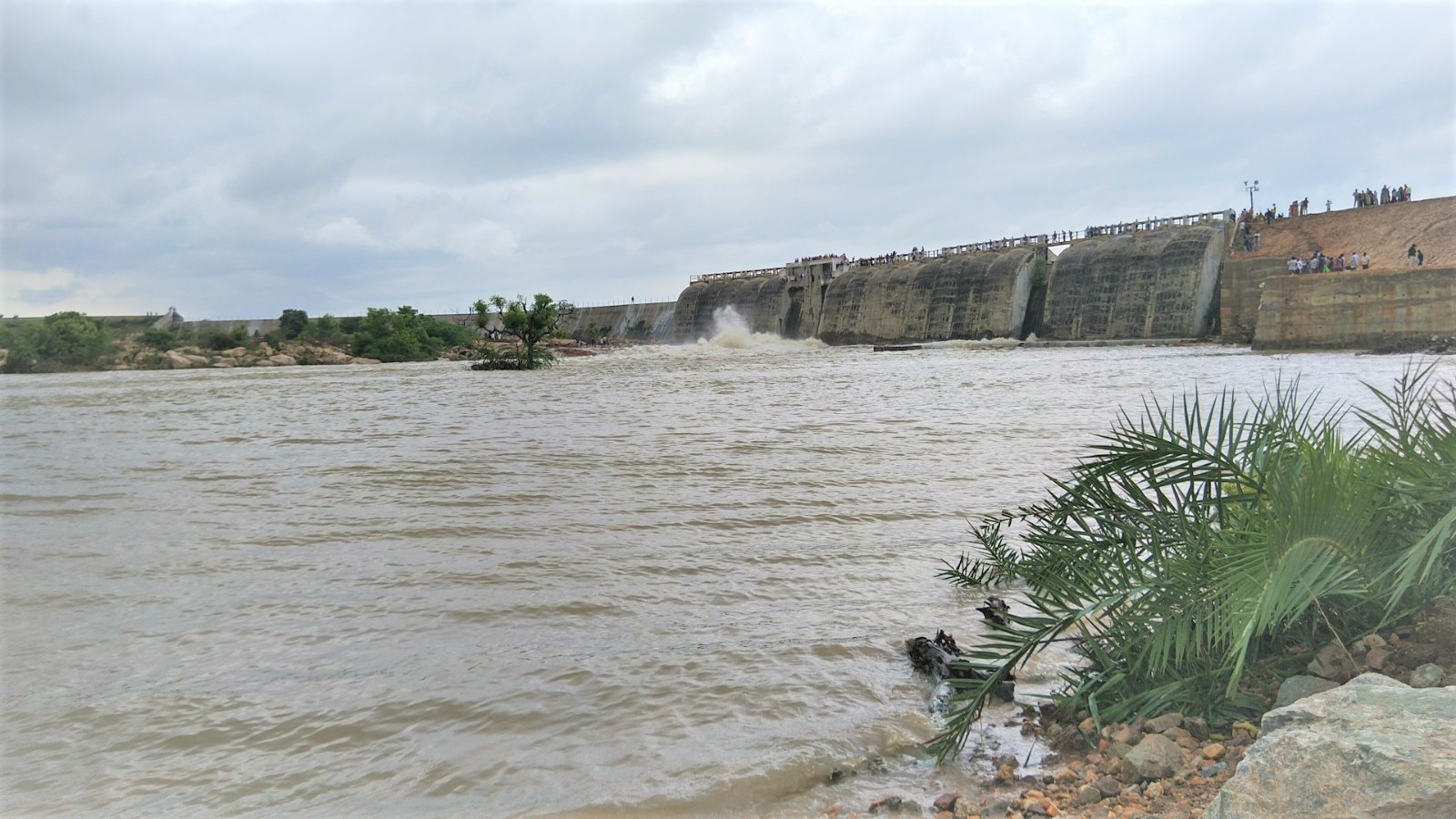
Front side view of sarala sagar dam

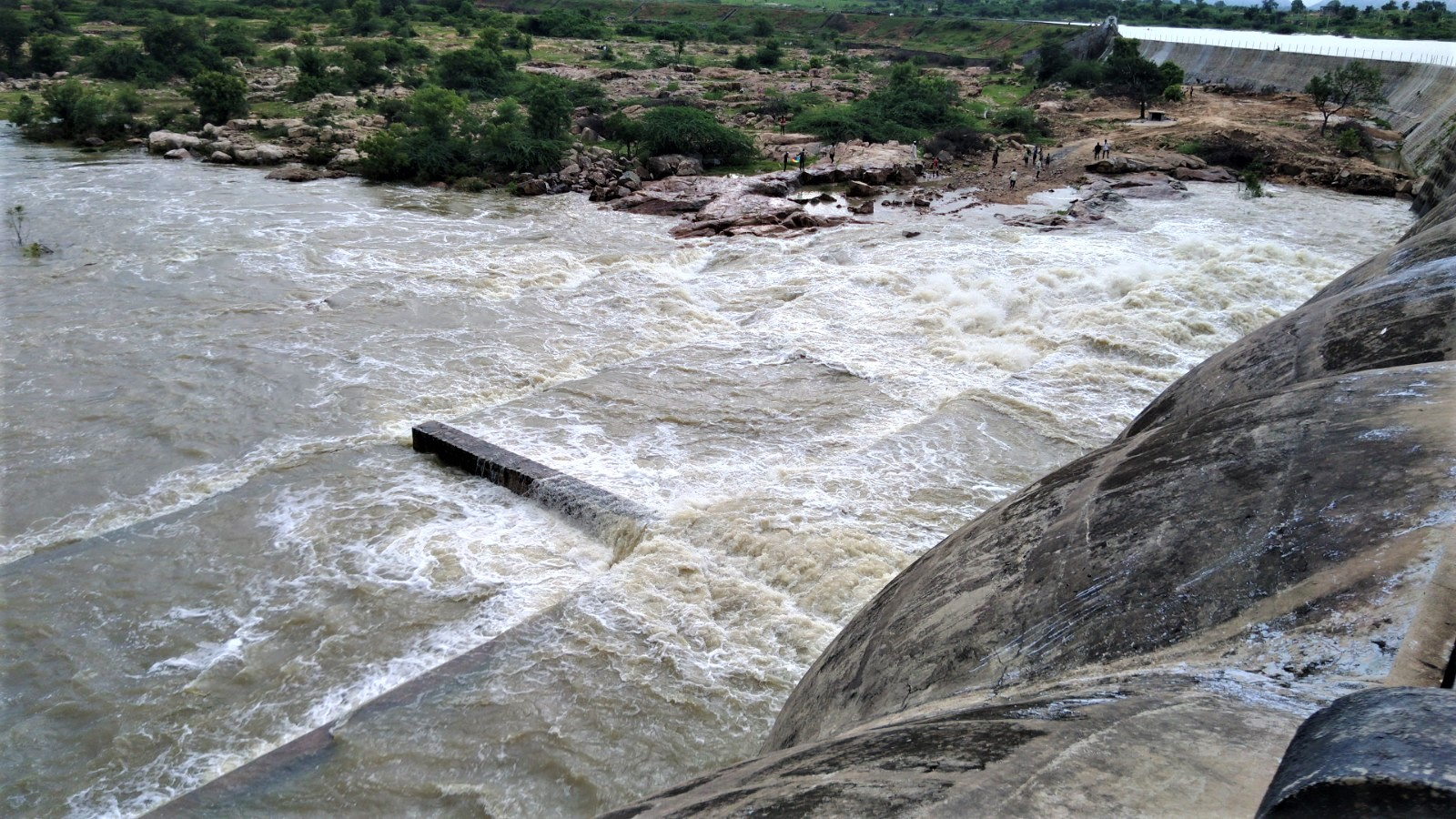
Top of the Front water view of dam

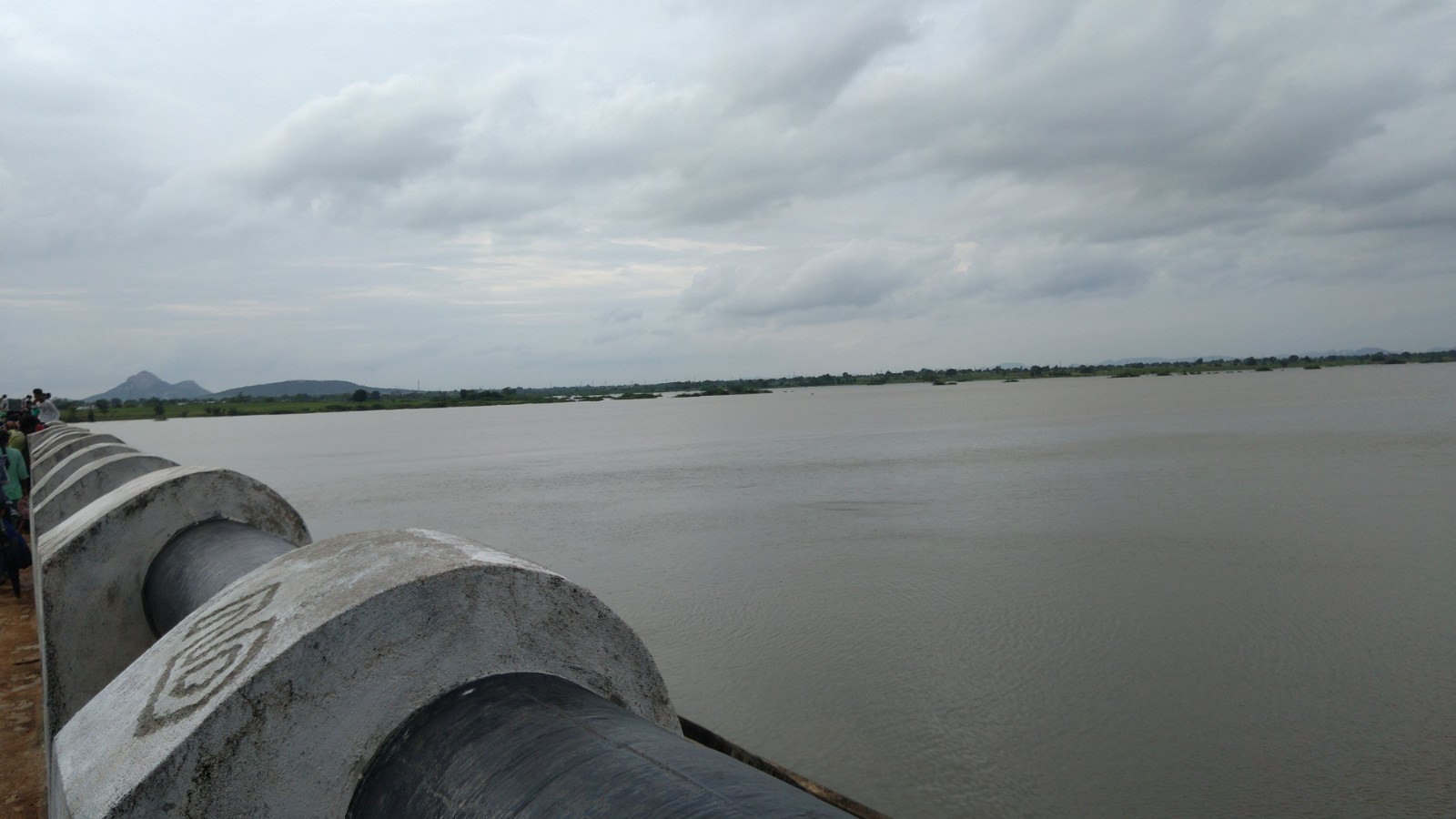
Top side view of sarala sagar dam
