= SRSP Flood Flow Canal =

- Native name: శ్రీరాంసాగర్ వరద కాలువ (Telugu)

Location
- Country: India

Physical characteristics
- Source: Sriram Sagar reservoir
  - coordinates: 18°54′54″N 78°20′32″E
  - elevation: 326 m (1,070 ft)
- Mouth: Mid Manair reservoir
- Length: 130 km (81 mi)
- Discharge
  - location: V&M: Mupkal
  - average: 623 m^{3}/s (22,000 cu ft/s)

SRSP Flood Flow Canal (Telugu:శ్రీరాంసాగర్ వరద కాలువ) also known as Sriram Sagar Flood Flow Canal (SRSP FFC), is a 130 km long gravity canal from Sriram Sagar Project, Village & Mandal Mupkal, Nizamabad District to Mid Manair Dam, Manwada Village, Karimnagar District, Telangana.

== History ==
This Canal initiated as part of Sriram Sagar stage-II in which the foundation stone was laid by the former prime minister P. V. Narasimha Rao in 1991. With this Canal the surplus water from Sriram Sagar Project can be taken into Mid Manair Dam to utilize another 25 tmcft and also it can be used to fill the Lower Manair Dam at Karimnagar City.

Canal construction was completed by July 2010, It was open in Aug 2010 after couple of trials. Canal is currently using to fill Lower Manair Dam as Mid Manair is under construction.

It has been designed in such way that it will discharge 22000 cusecs water (Max Capacity), which means it can carry 50 tmcft water into Mid Manair (26 tmcft) and Lower Manair (24 tmcft) reservoirs in just 25 days at its full canal capacity (i.e. 2 tmcft per day).

== Canal remodelling ==
The canal's full supply level (FSL) is 1,070 feet (326 m) MSL with 1,091 feet (333 m) MSL full reservoir level of Sriram Sagar reservoir. So the flood canal can be used only if the water level is above 1070 feet. The flood canal is not in use in most of the years as the water inflows in to the Sriram Sagar reservoir is not adequate to build up the level to 1070 ft. As an alternative, Yellampalli Lift Canal from Yellampalli Project is under construction with which water will be lifted into Flood Flow Canal at Gangadhara to feed Mid Manair Dam.

In fact, by re-engineering of this defunct canal to reverse its flow direction by raising its bank levels and installing low head high flow concrete volute pumps at existing major aqueducts, at balancing reservoirs & at Sriram Sagar reservoir inlet point, Godavari flood waters during monsoon months from the Pranahita Chevella lift can be stored in the 110 tmcft gross storage capacity of Sriram Sagar reservoir for use during the dry months. The stored water can be released back into Kakatiya Canal by gravity from the Sriram Sagar reservoir for use in the command area of SRSP as well as Pranahita Chevella projects when adequate water is not available in the lower Godavari basin during dry seasons. Also remodelled SRSP flood canal can be used for supplying water by gravity for irrigating nearly 300,000 acres on its both sides by the water supplied from the Pranahita Chevella project. To facilitate this remodelling in future, the single lift (96 MWC) envisaged from Myadaram tank to the SRSP flood flow canal should be split into two lifts (76 + 20 MWC) via Kakatiya canal. The re-engineering of this canal is similar to modifications carried out to reverse the water flow of ancient Grand canal under Eastern Route project of South to North Water Transfer in China.

== See also ==
- Sriram Sagar Project
- Lower Manair Dam
- Mid Manair Dam

- Upper Manair Dam
- Sripada Yellampalli project
- Nizam Sagar

- Kaddam Project
- Pranahita Chevella
- Alisagar lift irrigation scheme

- Sri Komaram Bheem Project
- Icchampally Project
