= Palair Lake =

- Paler Reservoir
- Location within Telangana Location within India
- Location: Khammam district, Telangana
- Coordinates: 17°13′N 79°54′E
- Type: reservoir
- Basin countries: India
- Water volume: 2.5 billion cubic feet (71 hm^{3}; 57,000 acre⋅ft)

Palair Lake also known as Paler (Palair) Reservoir is a man made lake and a major source of freshwater in the Khammam district of Telangana, India.

== Geography ==
Palair Reservoir is located at the Palair village in Kusumanchi mandal of the district and is about 30 kilometers away from the district headquarters of Khammam. The lake is a balancing reservoir for the Lal Bahadur Canal, a left bank canal of the Nagarjuna Sagar project. Covering an area of 1,748 hectares, the lake has a storage capacity of 2.5 TMC of water. The lake is an important tourist attraction in the district and water based adventure sports and recreational facilities have been provided at the lake in recent years to develop it as a tourist site. Electrical power is also generated using Palair reservoir water.right now the reservoir is only used for drinking and fishing and irrigation purposes only the water based sports are long gone in 2010.
