= Chanaka-Korata Barrage =

Dam on the Penganga River in India

- Construction began: March 2016

Chanaka-Korata Barrage is an inter-State barrage on Penganga River. The irrigation project started jointly by Government of Telangana and Government of Maharashtra in March 2016. It will irrigate agriculture in the states of Telangana and Maharashtra. The project is expected to be completed in 2 years, by kharif of 2018.

== History ==
The irrigation project was first conceived in 1975 but never started Neckar of its location in two states and also court cases by villages going to be submerged. The work, part of Lower Penganga, began in April 2016 at a cost of Rs.1227 crores. The MoU was signed by the Chief minister of Telangana, Kalvakuntla Chandrashekhar Rao and Chief Minister of Maharashtra, Devendra Fadnavis. The located is at Chanaka village in Maharashtra and Korata village in Adilabad, Telangana with no submergence of any villages.

== The Project ==
The barrage is 23 gates is located in Penganga at Chanaka village in Jainath mandal and Korata in Maharashtra. The barrage will irrigate 13,500 acres (5,500 ha) and 51,000 houses in 81 villages in Adilabad district.

The construction of the barrage, pump house, pipelines are built onsite, and canals were taken up simultaneously, working day and night shifts. A substation for electricity is also being completed.

The main canal runs by gravity through 42 kilometers. There are plans to construct a balancing reservoir with a capacity 3.5 TMC.
