= Gundrevula =

- Village
- Interactive map of Gundrevula
- Location in Andhra Pradesh Gundrevula (India)
- Coordinates: 15.8581271°N 77.70514430000003°E
- Country: India
- State: Andhra Pradesh
- District: Kurnool

Languages
  - Official: Telugu
- Time zone: UTC+5:30 (IST)

Gundrevula is a large village located in C.Belagal Mandal of Kurnool district, Andhra Pradesh with total 1137 families residing. The Gundrevula village has population of 5014 of which 2561 are males while 2453 are females as per Population Census 2011.

In Gundrevula village population of children with age 0-6 is 839 which makes up 16.73 % of total population of village. Average Sex Ratio of Gundrevula village is 958 which is lower than Andhra Pradesh state average of 993. Child Sex Ratio for the Gundrevula as per census is 924, lower than Andhra Pradesh average of 939.

Gundrevula village has lower literacy rate compared to Andhra Pradesh. In 2011, literacy rate of Gundrevula village was 44.22 % compared to 67.02 % of Andhra Pradesh. In Gundrevula Male literacy stands at 56.28 % while female literacy rate was 31.71 %.

As per constitution of India and Panchyati Raaj Act, Gundrevula village is administrated by Sarpanch (Head of Village) who is elected representative of village.

Particulars	Total	Male	Female
Total No. of Houses	1137	-	-
Population	5014	2561	2453
Child (0-6)	839	436	403
Schedule Caste	968	496	472
Schedule Tribe	17	9	8
Literacy	44.22%	56.28%	31.71%
Total Workers	2819	1476	1343
Main Worker	2777	15888	0
Marginal Worker	42	14	28
Caste Factor; Schedule Caste (SC) constitutes 19.31 % while Schedule Tribe (ST) were 0.34 % of total population in Gundrevula village. Work Profile In Gundrevula village out of total population, 2819 were engaged in work activities. 98.51 % of workers describe their work as Main Work (Employment or Earning more than 6 Months) while 1.49 % were involved in Marginal activity providing livelihood for less than 6 months. Of 2819 workers engaged in Main Work, 629 were cultivators (owner or co-owner) while 2028 were Agricultural labourer.
