= Koil Sagar =

Coordinates: 16°42′28″N 77°46′35″E

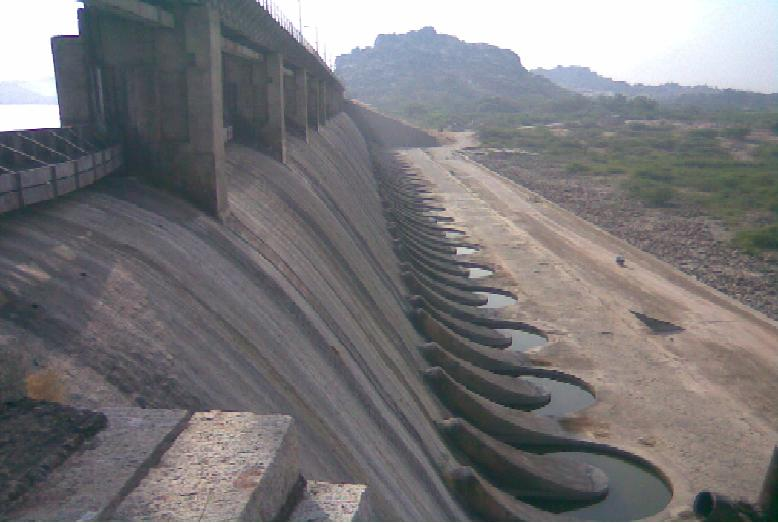
Koilsagar

Koilsagar Dam is located at Koilsagar Village of Deverakadra Mandal in Mahabubnagar District. Koilsagar Dam is one of the famous tourist attractions of Mahabubnagar District. Beside Koilsagar there is Veerabadhra Temple called KoilKonda. Every year there is a celebration (Jathara) held by nearby villagers.

This medium reservoir with live water storage capacity of 60 million cubic meters (2.1 tmc ft), was constructed on the peddavagu tributary of Krishna River

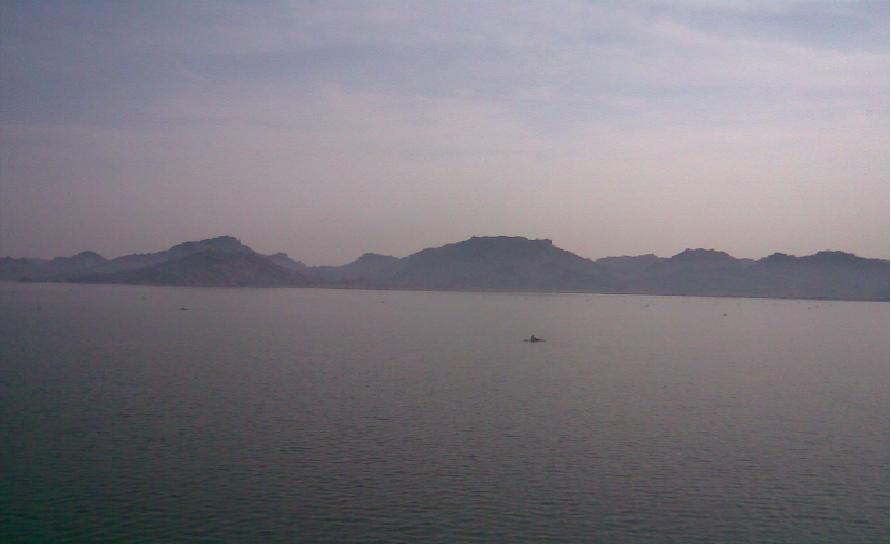
Koilsagar

== See also ==
- Jurala Project
