= Mahadevpur =

- Village
- Nickname: MDP
- Location in Telangana, India Mahadevpur (India)
- Coordinates: 18.731554°N 79.983666°E
- Country: India
- State: Telangana
- District: Jayashankar

Population (2011)
  - Total: 38,451

Languages
  - Official: Telugu Urdu
- Time zone: UTC+5:30 (IST)
- Postal code: 505504
- Telephone code: 08720
- Vehicle registration: TS 25
- Nearest city: Warangal
- Lok Sabha constituency: Peddapally
- Vidhan Sabha constituency: Manthani
- Website: http://manamanthani.com

Mahadevpur is a village in Mahadevpur mandal in Jayashankar Bhupalpally district of Telangana, India.

It is located in the north-east of the district near the border with Maharashtra and Chhattisgarh. The mandal has borders with Maharashtra in the north, Chhattisgarh in the east, with Khammam district and Warangal district in the south-east. It is famous for red chilli corp.
