= Lower Manair Dam =

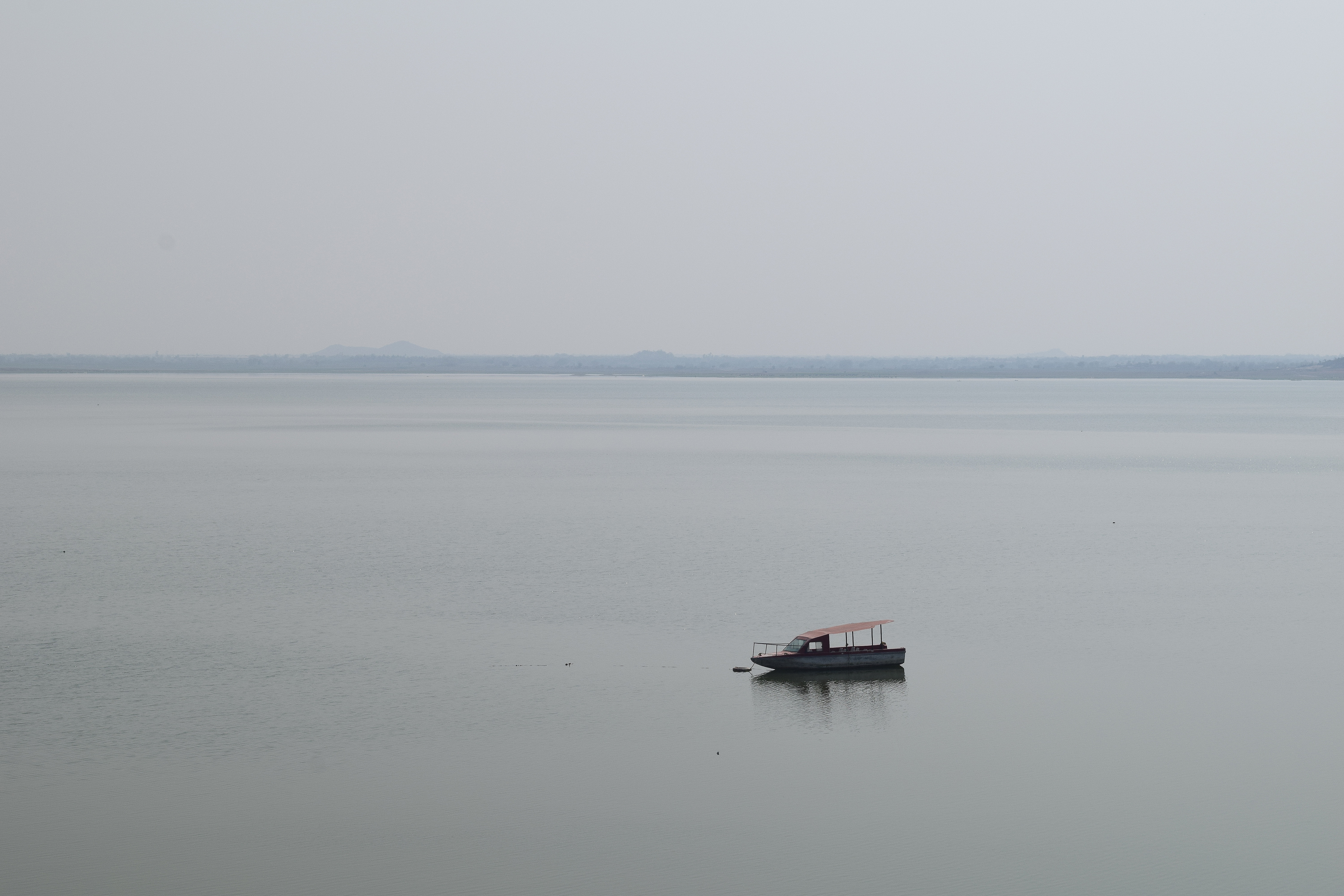
- Lower Manair Reservoir

- Location within Telangana Location within India
- Official name: Lower Manair Dam
- Location: Karimnagar district, Telangana, India
- Coordinates: 18°23′59″N 79°7′52″E
- Opening date: 1985; 41 years ago
- Owner: Government of Telangana

Dam and spillways
- Impounds: Manair River
- Height: 41 metres (135 ft) from river level
- Length: 10,741 metres (35,240 ft)

Reservoir
- Creates: Lower Manair Reservoir
- Total capacity: 680,137,000 m^{3} (551,396 acre⋅ft) (24.02 tmc ft)
- Active capacity: 621,000,000 m^{3} (503,453 acre⋅ft) (21.9 tmc ft)
- Catchment area: 6,648 square kilometres (2,567 sq mi)
- Surface area: 81 km^{2} (31 sq mi)

Lower Manair Dam also known as LMD was constructed across the Manair River, at Alugunur village, Thimmapur mandal, Karimnagar District, in the Indian state of Telangana during 1974 to 1985. It provides irrigation to a gross command area of 163,000 hectares (400,000 acres).

== Location ==
The Lower Manair Dam is located on the Manair River at 18°24' N latitude and 79° 20' E longitude in Karimnagar District at Km.146 of Kakatiya Canal. The Manair River is a tributary of the Godavari River and the dam is built across the river at the confluence with Mohedamada River. The dam drains a catchment area of 6,464 square kilometres (2,496 sq mi) which includes 1,797.46 square kilometres (694.00 sq mi) of free catchment and the balance is intercepted catchment. Karimanagar town is 6 kilometres (3.7 mi) away from the dam.

In the vicinity of the LMD which is the only place of recreation for the people of Karimnagar, in the light of recent drowning incidents and the insecurity created by hooligans, security measures have been stepped up.

== Features ==
Lower Manair Dam's construction was started in 1974 and commissioned in 1985. It is an Earth cum Masonry dam. The dam height above the deepest foundation is 41 metres (135 ft); the maximum height of the earth dam is 88 feet (27 m). The dam length is 10,471 metres (34,354 ft), top width is 24 feet (7.3 m). It has a volume content of 5.41 million cum with a reservoir water spread area of 81 square kilometres (31 sq mi) at FRL of 280 m (920 ft). The gross storage capacity of the reservoir is 680 million cubic meters and the effective storage capacity is 621 million cubic meters (Mcm). The spillway is designed for discharge of capacity 14,170 cubic metres (500,000 cu ft)/ second (and is controlled by 20 gates of 15.24 by 7.31 metres (50.0 ft × 24.0 ft) size, while the maximum observed flood discharge is reported to be 9,910 cubic metres (350,000 cu ft)/second.

The storage behind the dam serves as a balancing reservoir for the Kakatiya Canal and regulates flow for irrigation. The command area for irrigation is 163,000 hectares (400,000 acres).

The water quality status of the Lower Manair Reservoir was studied from September 2009 to August 2010 for the physico- chemical parameters such as water temperature, pH, turbidity, transparency, total dissolved solids, total hardness, chlorides, phosphate, nitrates, dissolved oxygen (DO) and biological oxygen demand (BOD). The results indicated that all parameters of water quality were within permissible limits and it was concluded that the water in the reservoir was fit for use for irrigation, drinking water supply and pisciculture.

== Reservoir fisheries ==
Studies were conducted in the LMD reservoir from June 2013 to May 2014 to identify the larvivorous activity of fishes. On the basis of morphometric and meristematic characters, the 58 fish species are identified in the reservoir. Also reported were 53 ornamental fish species comprising eight orders; of these 23 species belong to cypriniformes order. Awaous grammepomus, also called Scribbled goby was also identified.

== See also ==
- Sriram Sagar Project
- SRSP Flood Flow Canal
- Mid Manair Dam
- Upper Manair Dam
- Sripada Yellampalli project
- Nizam Sagar
- Kaddam Project
- Pranahita Chevella
- Alisagar lift irrigation scheme
- Sri Komaram Bheem Project
- Icchampally Project
