= Yellampalli =

Village in Karnataka, India

- Village
- Location in Karnataka, India Yellampalli (India)
- Coordinates: 13°44′44″N 77°50′12″E
- Country: India
- State: Karnataka
- District: Chikkaballapura
- Taluk: Bagepalli
- Elevation: 750 m (2,460 ft)

Population (2011)
  - Total: 3,527

Languages
  - Official: Kannada
- Time zone: UTC+5:30 (IST)
- PIN: 561207

Yellampalli is a village in Chikkaballapura district of Karnataka in India. It is located to the southeast of Bagepalli. It had a population of 3,527 in 2011.

== Geography ==
The village of Yellampalli is located at the northern part of Chikkaballapura district, along the Bagepalli Road. It has an area of 1251.1 hectares.

== Demographics ==
In the 2011 Indian census, there were 3,527 people residing in 870 households. The literacy rate was 55.46%, with 1,115 of the male population and 841 of the female population being literate.
