= Sri Komaram Bheem Project =

- Location within Telangana Location within India
- Official name: కొమరం భీం ప్రాజెక్ట్); Sri Komaram Bheem Project
- Location: Ada village, Asifabad Mandal, Komaram Bheem district, Telangana, India
- Coordinates: 19°26′0″N 79°13′26″E
- Opening date: 19 November 2011

Dam and spillways
- Impounds: Peddavagu River
- Height: 18 metres (59 ft) above lowest foundation.
- Length: 1,012 metres (3,320 ft)

Reservoir
- Creates: Sri Komaram Bheem Reservoir

The Sri Komaram Bheem Project (Telugu: కొమరం భీం ప్రాజెక్ట్) is a Medium Reservoir that has been built across Peddavagu River, a tributary of the Pranahita River. It is located at Ada village, Asifabad Mandal, Komaram Bheem district, Telangana.

The project named after Komaram Bheem (Telugu:కొమరం భీం 22 October 1901 – 19 October 1940), was a tribal leader who fought against the Asaf Jahi Dynasty for the liberation of Hyderabad State. Komaram Bheem openly fought against the ruling Nizam government in a guerrilla campaign. He defied courts, laws, and any other form of Nizam authority, living off the sustenance of the forest. He took up arms against Nizam Nawab's soldiers, and fought Babi Jhari until his last breath.

This Project proposed to supply water to Komaram Bheem, Wankidi, Kagaznagar, and Sirpur mandals more than 45,000 in acres. But currently, the project is providing irrigation water to about 20,000 acres under its left canal 35 km. Right canal will provide irrigation water to about another 25000 acres.

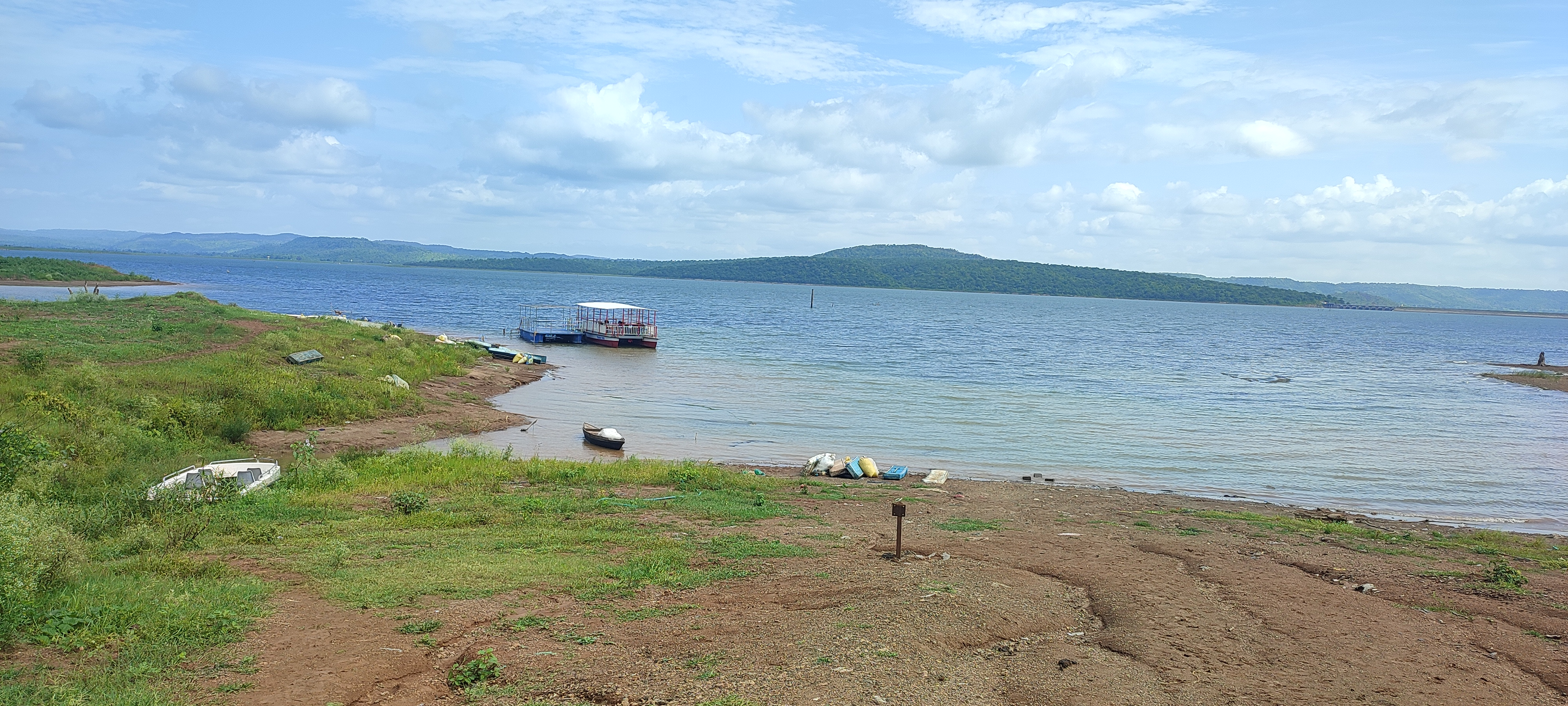
Project proposed to supply water to Komaram Bheem, Wankidi, Kagaznagar, and Sirpur mandals more than 45,000 in acres.

== See also ==
- Godavari River Basin Irrigation Projects
- Pranahita Chevella lift irrigation scheme
- Alisagar lift irrigation scheme
- Sripada Yellampalli project
- Lower Manair Dam
- Sriram Sagar Project
- Nizamsagar
- Icchampally Project
- Kaddam Project
