= J. Chokka Rao Devadula Lift Irrigation Scheme =

Indian lift irrigation scheme

Coordinates: 18°35′27″N 80°21′04″E

The J. Chokka Rao Devadula lift irrigation scheme is a lift irrigation scheme in India. It is the second biggest of its kind in Asia. Devadula is the place in Mulugu district, Telangana, where the scheme's intake well is located. The foundation stone for this scheme was laid by the Chief Minister of Combined State Shri. Nara Chandra Babu Naidu in the year 2001.

== The Project ==
The project is specially designed to lift water from the River Godavari to irrigate more than 600,000 acres (2,400 km^{2}) in the drought-prone Telangana state, India. Later it was named after the politician J. Chokkarao as the 'J. Chokkarao Devadula lift irrigation scheme'. The total work was divided into three phases for executional convenience in the year 2003.

The minimum river water level required is 73 m MSL in the river to pump the water, whereas the non-monsoon / lean season river water level is below 71 m MSL. Across the Godavari river, Sammakka Barrage with FRl at 85 m MSL is in an advanced stage of construction to make water available to the pump house in all seasons.

The maximum water lift is by 510 meters. The project's operational requirement is 484 MW power and 1.4 billion KWh of electrical energy annually for pumping 38 Tmcft water. This lift canal is an inter-river basin transfer link by feeding Godavari River water to Krishna River basin in Warangal and Nalgonda districts.

== Honour ==
The project was renamed to honour J. Chokka Rao, a freedom fighter from Karimnagar.

== See also ==
- Pranahita Chevella lift irrigation scheme
- Inchampalli project
- Handri-Neeva
- Kakatiya Canal
