= Kaddam Project =

- Location within Telangana Location within India
- Official name: kadem river project
- Location: Kadem, Nirmal District, Telangana, India
- Coordinates: 19°6′29″N 78°47′27″E
- Opening date: 1958
- Construction cost: 600 Crores

Dam and spillways
- Impounds: Kadem River
- Height: 31 metres (102 ft) from river level
- Length: 2,051 metres (6,729 ft)

Reservoir
- Creates: Kadem Reservoir
- Total capacity: 215,800,000 m^{3} (174,952 acre⋅ft)
- Active capacity: 137,100,000 m^{3} (111,149 acre⋅ft) (4.82 Tmc ft)
- Catchment area: 2,590 square kilometres (1,000 sq mi)
- Surface area: 24.7 km^{2} (9.5 sq mi)

The Kadem Project is a reservoir on the river Kadem, a tributary river of Godavari near Kademm Mandal, Nirmal District, Telangana. This project covers localised ayacut under Nirmal and Mancherial Districts.

The Project has been integrated with Sriram Sagar Project. The reservoir being supplemented through Sri Rama Sagar Project by Saraswathi Canal to stabilize the localized catchment area.

It has two major canals for water distribution, the Left canal length is 76.8 km and Right Canal length is about 8 km.

== See also ==
- Nizamsagar
- Godavari River Basin Irrigation Projects
- Pranahita Chevella lift irrigation scheme
- Alisagar lift irrigation scheme
- Sripada Yellampalli project
- Lower Manair Dam
- Upper Manair Dam
- Icchampally Project
