= Pranahita Chevella Lift Irrigation Project =

Indian lift irrigation project

The Pranahita Chevella Lift Irrigation Project (PCLIP) is a lift irrigation project to harness the water of Pranahita tributary of Godavari River for use in the Telangana state of India. The river water diversion barrage across the Pranahita River is located at Thammidihatti village in Komaram Bheem district of Telangana. This lift canal is an inter river basin transfer link by feeding Godavari River water to Krishna River basin. The chief ministers of Telangana and Maharashtra states reached an agreement in 2016 to limit the full reservoir level (FRL) of the barrage at 148 m msl with 1.85 tmcft storage capacity. In the year 2016, this project is divided into two parts. The scheme with diversion canal from the Thammmidihatti barrage to connect to existing Yellampalli reservoir across the Godavari River is presently called Pranahita barrage lift irrigation project. This scheme is confined to providing irrigation facility to nearly 2,00,000 acres in Adilabad district using 44 tmcft water.

The second part is called Kaleshwaram Lift Irrigation Scheme where water from Godavari river after the confluence by the Pranahita tributary, is lifted from Medigadda barrage near Kaleswaram temple town via Yellampalli reservoir (FRL 148 m msl) to provide lift irrigation facility in Karimnagar, Warangal, Nizamabad and Medak districts. This scheme is similar to the old Pranahita Chevella lift irrigation scheme with number of pumping stations, barrages (Medigadda barrage across Godavari at FRL 100 m msl with 16 tmcft storage, Annaram barrage across Godavari at FRL 120 m msl with 3.52 tmcft storage and Sundilla barrage across Godavari at FRL 130 m msl with 1.62 tmcft storage), balancing reservoirs, etc.

== Interstate agreement ==
Under Godavari Water Disputes Tribunal award agreements, Maharashtra state earlier agreed for construction of barrages by the undivided Andhra Pradesh state across the Pranahita river which is forming common boundary between the two states. This agreement limits new water uses in Maharashstra to nearly 300 tmcft in a year from Pranahita and Indravati river basins. In the Pranahita basin, 23 river basin points are identified whose upstream water availability is totally allocated to Maharashtra, Chhattisgarh and Madhya Pradesh states. Maharashtra state is also allocated another 76 tmcft water from the downstream of these river basin points which forms nearly 30,000 km^{2} in the Pranahita basin area. This area receiving in excess of 1250 mm average yearly rain fall, yields more than 300 tmcft in a 75% dependable water year. Thus, more than 224 tmcft water is available at Thammidihatti barrage location for use in Telangana state after accounting the permitted uses by Maharashtra. Already Maharashtra is using more than 300 tmcft permitted water in the Pranahita basin alone drastically reducing water yield at Thumbadihatti barrage point.

== History ==
The foundation stone was laid by the then Chief Minister of Andhra Pradesh, Dr. Y. S. Rajasekhara Reddy in 2008. Signing of an agreement by Andhra Pradesh and Maharashtra to implement the Rs. 17,000-crore mega project of Pranahita-Chevella at Delhi in the presence of Chief Ministers of both States opened a new chapter with regard to utilisation of water in the Godavari basin.

Andhra Pradesh has so far spent Rs 1,600 crore on various packages of the project, which was designed by a group of engineers to use 160 Tmcft of Pranahita water and serve 16.4 lakh acres in the water scarcity areas of Adilabad, Karimnagar, Warangal, Nizamabad, Medak, Nalgonda and Ranga Reddy districts.

This huge investment would have been a waste if Maharashtra had opposed to it. Maharashtra's consent is seen crucial because the barrage required for the project to divert Pranahita waters will have to be built in its territory also. The water from this barrage will be transferred into the reservoir of the Yellampalli project already constructed across the Godavari, before being released to the intended areas, including Hyderabad city (30 tmcft) for drinking purpose. Maharashtra state can also benefit equally by envisaging lift irrigation schemes for uplands irrigation by drawing water from the left bank of the barrage as the left bank of the barrage is close to steep hill ridge (above 190 m MSL).

Moreover, this barrage is the suitable diversion point to transfer Pranahita water to water deficit Marathwada region of Maharashtra via Sriram Sagar reservoir. So the higher storage capacity and the higher full reservoir level (full reservoir level at 152 m msl with 5 tmcft storage) of the barrage is also in the interest of Maharashtra state. Earlier in the Babli barrage dispute, Maharashtra claimed that it has right to use the water available in the Sriram Sagar reservoir as per the agreement dated 06.10.1975 of Godavari Water Disputes Tribunal and Supreme Court upheld the claim of Maharashtra

Pranahita-Chevella is the costliest of Jalayagnam projects requiring 3,466 MW of power & annual electricity of 7.5 billion KWhr with 530 meters average pumping head. The initial 222 meters pumping head up to Middle Manair reservoir can be saved if it is possible to divert water via SRSP Flood Flow Canal from Sriramsagar reservoir whose water availability /inflows could be enhanced to 250 tmc when Maharashtra and Karnataka do not over use the Godavari water in excess of their water use entitlements.

== Alternate to Medigadda Barrage ==
The barrage at Thammidihatti can be constructed with FRL at 148 m msl but the shortfall in water requirement can be augmented by interlinking Pranahita river with Indravati River in to Thummidihatti barrage pond or its main water diversion canal with an aqueduct ( at 19°17′23″N 79°56′59″E) across Pranahita river. The point of diversion 19°13′57″N 80°23′15″E from the Indravati river is at 174.5 m msl which is the minimum draw down level (MDDL) of the proposed Bhopalpattanam dam. Bhopalpattanam Hydro project is a proposed joint project of Maharashtra and Chhattisgarh states as identified in GWDT award. Initially, a weir would be constructed across the Indravati river where its bed level is at 170 m msl to divert its water by gravity canal with tunnels to reach Thammidihatti pond. The weir would get submerged when the Bhopalpattanam dam is constructed up to proposed FRL at 200.254 m msl without any effect on the link canal use. The link canal would also supply irrigation water in Pranahita basin of Maharashtra and the excess water diverted to the Thammidihatti pond can also be used by Maharashtra for lift irrigation. Once Bhopalpattanam dam is constructed, it would also ensure water transfer throughout the year by Indravati to Pranahita link canal in addition to hydro electricity generation.

Once Medigedda and other barrages are constructed, it rules out the construction of Inchampally project which are crucial to Telangana state for harnessing the Godavari water for its full needs to the extent of 1000 tmcft. Interlinking Indravati river with Pranahita river by gravity canal is many times economical proposition for the successful operation of Pranahita Chevella lift irrigation scheme and also useful to Maharashtra without submerging any land (other than river bed) in Chhattisgarh state.

== See also ==
- Devadula lift irrigation scheme
- Inchampalli project
