= Sriram Sagar Project =

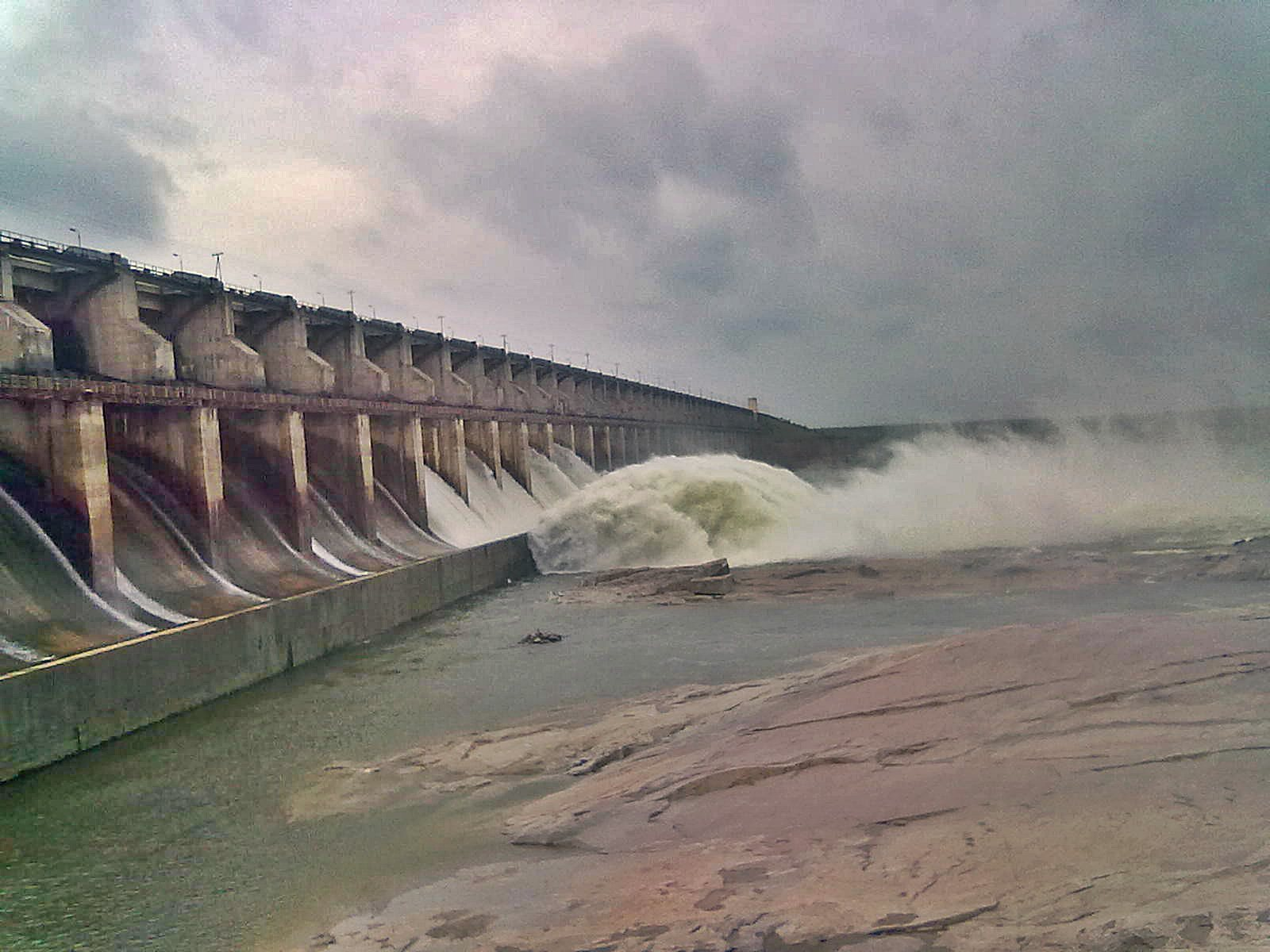
- Sriram Sagar Dam (Pochampadu Dam)

- Location within Telangana Location within India
- Location: Nizamabad, Telangana, India
- Coordinates: 18°58′03″N 78°20′35″E
- Construction began: 1963
- Opening date: 1977; 49 years ago

Dam and spillways
- Impounds: Godavari River
- Height: 43 metres (141 ft) from river level
- Length: 15,600 metres (51,181 ft)

Reservoir
- Total capacity: 3,172,000,000 m^{3} (2,571,582 acre⋅ft) (112.02 tmcft)
- Active capacity: 2,322,000,000 m^{3} (1,882,476 acre⋅ft) (81.95 tmcft)
- Surface area: 451 km^{2} (174 sq mi)

The Sriram Sagar Project is also known as the Pochampadu Project is an Indian flood-flow project on the Godavari. The Project is located in Nizamabad district, 3 km away from National Highway 44. It has been described by The Hindu as a "lifeline for a large part of Telangana".

Sriramsagar is an irrigation project across river Godavari in Telangana to serve irrigational needs in Karimnagar, Warangal, Adilabad, Nizamabad, and Khammam districts. It also provides drinking water to Warangal city. There is a hydroelectric plant working at the dam site, with 4 turbines each with 9 MW capacity generating 36 MW.

== History ==
Irrigation in drought prone Telangana has existed for a few hundred years in small areas served by locally constructed village tanks. from 1942 to 1951, the erst while Government of Hyderabad submitted a scheme to Government of India, Planning Commission with a dam Proposal at Pochampadu village on river Godavari and Dams on its tributaries namely the Kaddam and Manair Rivers. The Pochampadu site was located 54.50 km below the entry point of Godavari River into AP Territory (now Telangana). The Project was further revised in the year 1958. The foundation was laid on 26 July 1963 by the late Jawaharlal Nehru, first Prime Minister of India. The Pochampadu Project was cleared by the planning commission and Central Water Commission, vide Lr. No. NPII-2(13)/1964, I&P Dt: 07.08.1964 for the construction of reservoir across Godavari River, Pochampadu Village Adilabad. which is about 5 km upstream of Soan Bridge on Hyderabad- Nagpur National highway No 7 to irrigate 5.7 Lakh Acres up to Manair valley under right bank canal named as Kakatiya Canal. The Administrative sanction for the Pochamopadu was accorded by the Government of Andhra Pradesh vide G.O. Ms. No 361 (PWD Irrigation Project wing) Dt 27.11.1964 for Rs, 40.10 Crores with SSR 1963–64. Water was first impounded and released in July 1970 and in July 1973 into Kakatiya Main Canal up to 36 km and 68 km creating an Irrigation potential of 25000 acres and 58000 acres respectively. The Pochampadu project was renamed as Sriramasagar Project, vide G.O.Ms. No. 355 Irrigation & Power (Projects wing) Dept., Dt 20.11.1978. The Reservoir was first filled to its fillcapacity i.e. (+)1091 ft in the year 1983.The engineers responsible for the construction were wide, among them was Mohammed Moin Ahmed (R&b) Nizamabad later in the 1980s.

== The project ==
Sriram Sagar Reservoir's capacity is 90 tmcft and it has 42 floodgates. It also includes Kakatiya Canal covering 346 km, Laxmi Canal, Sarswati Canal, and Flood flow canal. Construction of this dam was started in 1957. Most of the catchment area upstream of this dam is located in Maharashtra.

This project is also locally known as the Khustapuram dam. The Khustapuram project proposal was first mooted/investigated by erstwhile Hyderabad state under Nizam rule to utilize 227 tmcft of upper Godavari river water. This dam site is located in the Nizamabad district of Telangana State, after the confluence of the Manjira river with the Godavari. Under stage I of this project, nearly 1 million acres (400,000 ha) of irrigation facility has been created to utilize 140 tmc water. Stage II of this project is under an advanced stage of construction to irrigate 440,000 acres (180,000 ha) using 25 tmc water. The flood flow canal project is also under implementation to irrigate 200,000 acres (81,000 ha) using 20 tmcft water available at the Pochampadu dam site. The live storage capacity of SS dam is limited to 90 tmcft to reduce the submergence area in Maharashtra up to FRL level 1,091 feet (333 m) above mean sea level as per the agreement, between Maharashtra and Telangana.

== Interstate dispute ==
In the catchment area of this dam, Maharashtra has constructed many medium and minor irrigation projects in excess of its water use entitlements under Godavari Water Disputes Tribunal ( GWDT ). In last nine years, the dependable water availability has reduced to 33% (i.e. adequate water is available once in three years) against the designed dependability of 75% under GWDT. This major irrigation project has become many years unproductive / idle in the last decade. Due to complete utilization of river water in the upstream river basin area, the water quality in the reservoir has high alkalinity and salinity which is unsafe for human and cattle consumption. Also the ground water in the lower reaches of Pochampadu dam catchment area would gradually turn unsuitable for irrigation and human consumption.

Supreme court verdict (section 83 ii b) on Babli Project dispute stipulated that the gates of Babhali barrage remain lifted during the monsoon season, i.e., 1 July to 28 October and there is no obstruction to the natural flow of Godavari river during monsoon season below the three dams (Paithan, Siddheshwar and Nizamsagar dams) mentioned in Clause II (i) of the GWDT agreement dated 06.10.1975 towards Pochampad dam. Thus Pochampadu reservoir is accorded first priority over any other reservoir (major, medium, minor, barrage, etc.) to receive the water generated from the Godavari basin area located below these three dams. As stipulated by Supreme court, central government has set up monitoring committee to implement / supervise the water sharing as per agreement dated 06.10.1975 and supreme court verdict.

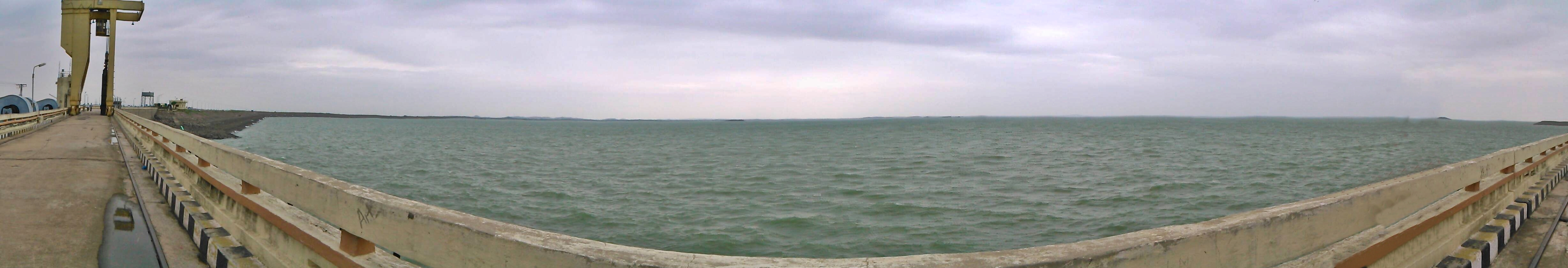
Panoramic View

== See also ==
- Godavari River Basin Irrigation Projects
- Pranahita Chevella lift irrigation scheme
- Interstate River Water Disputes Act
- Babli Project
- Alisagar lift irrigation scheme
- Krishna Water Disputes Tribunal
- Nizamsagar
- Icchampally Project
