= Alisagar lift irrigation scheme =

Park and irrigation project in Telangana, India

Coordinates: 18°56′24″N 78°06′06″E

Alisagar is a park, tourist attraction and an irrigation project which is 13 km (6.2 mi) from Nizamabad and 2 km (1.2 mi) off the Nizamabad-Bodhan road. The park was opened by the Nizam of Hyderabad in 1928. The park contains forested areas, a summer house, well laid out gardens, a reservoir and island, and a hilltop guest house all of which make it a favored getaway location. Additional attractions include a deer park, and facilities for trekking and water sports.

== History ==
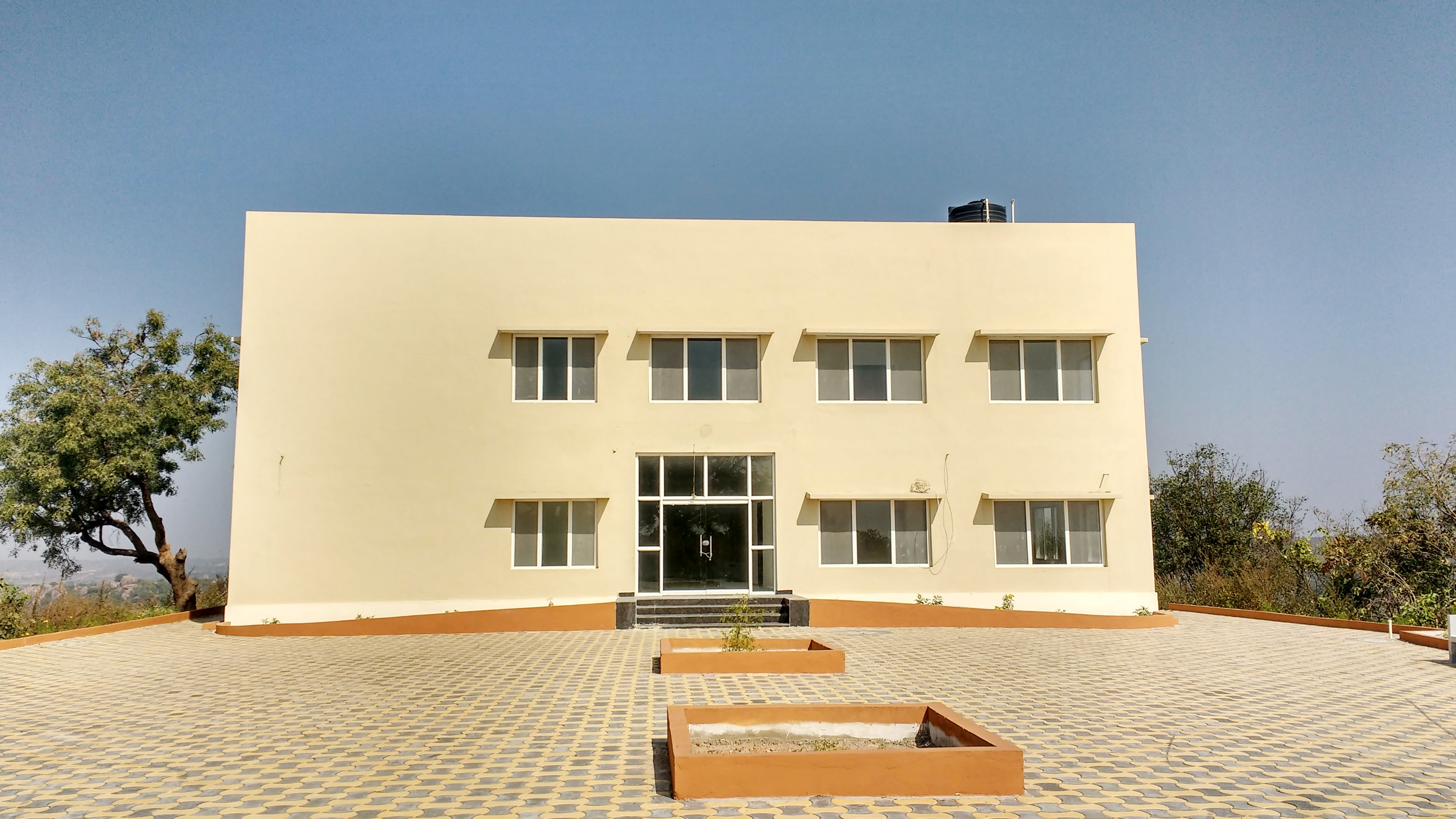
Guest House at hilltop

In the year 1931, the Alisagar reservoir or lake was built by the order of the 7th Nizam of Hyderabad. Later in the year 1985, the deer park was established with an aim to offer a safe haven to several species of deer. A natural habitat was created for the deer. Dense vegetation can be witnessed in this region.

== The project ==
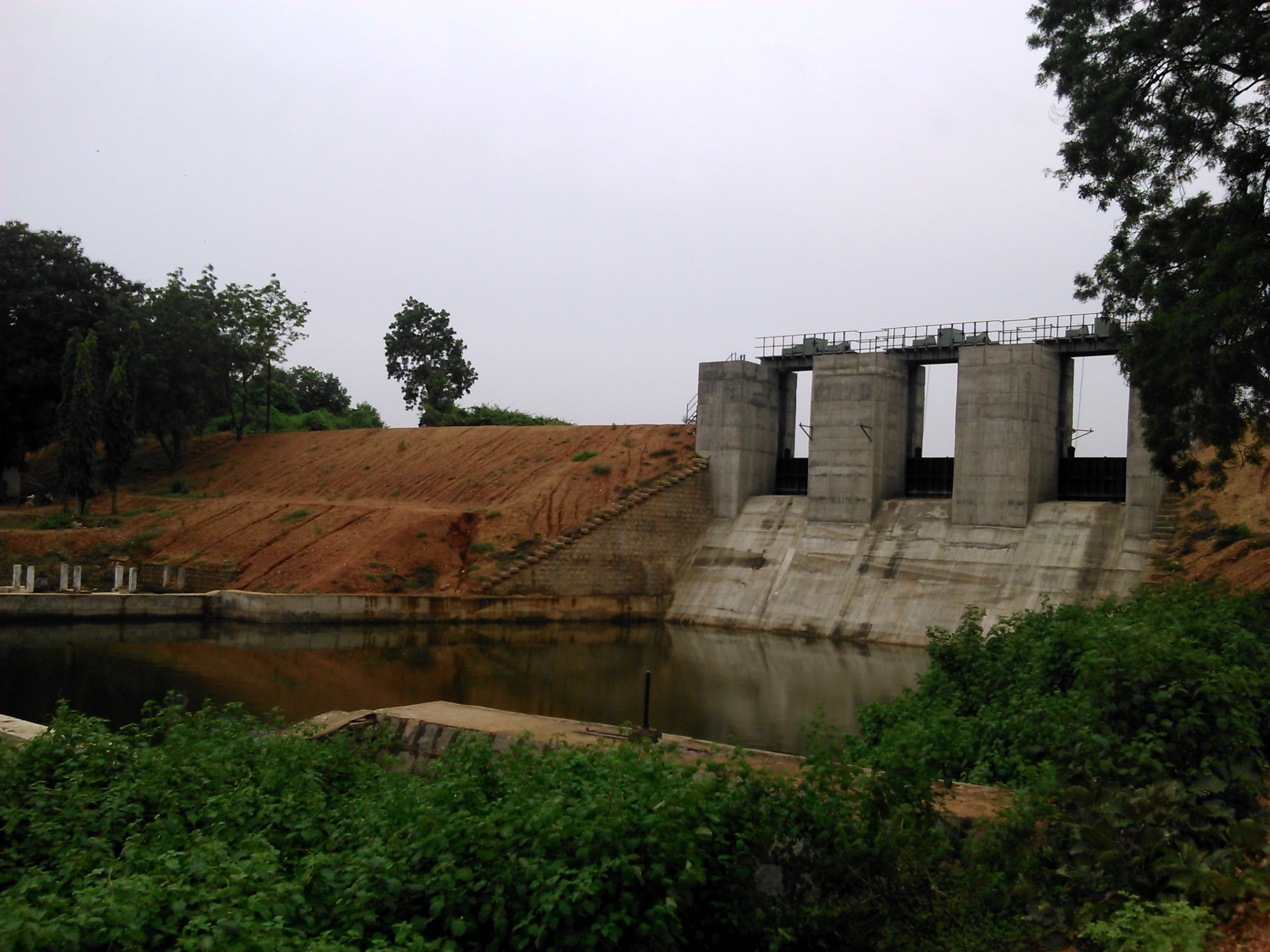
Irrigation dam

Alisagar lift irrigation project is a lift irrigation project located in Nizamabad district in Telangana, India. The lift canal originates from the back waters of Pochampadu Dam

Alisagar Lift irrigation scheme is intended to stabilize the gap ayacut of 53,793 acres from distributor 50 to 73 of Nizamsagar Project. The foreshore water of Sriram Sagar Project at Kosli (Village) will be lifted in three stages to feed the Alisagar balancing Reservoir at Mile 54 to Mile 56 on Main Canal of Nizamsagar Project.

In the first stage, 720 cusecs of water from Godavari River is proposed to be lifted from Kosli (V) Navipet (Mandal) Nizamabad Dist. and proposed to be dropped into cistern at Bharath Tanda. From there, the water is proposed to be dropped into Thadbiloli Tank by Gravity Canal.

In the second stage, water is proposed to be lifted from the foreshore of Thadbiloli Tank and proposed to be dropped into a cistern at Kalyanpur Gutta. It is proposed to carry water by gravity canal called Link Canal into Distributary No: 50 to irrigate 9,302 acres and another at higher level to irrigate 10,052 acres and balance water is proposed to be dropped into Pocharam Tank by gravity canal.

In the third stage, water is proposed to be lifted from Pocharam Tank and dropped in a cistern near Alisagar Gutta.

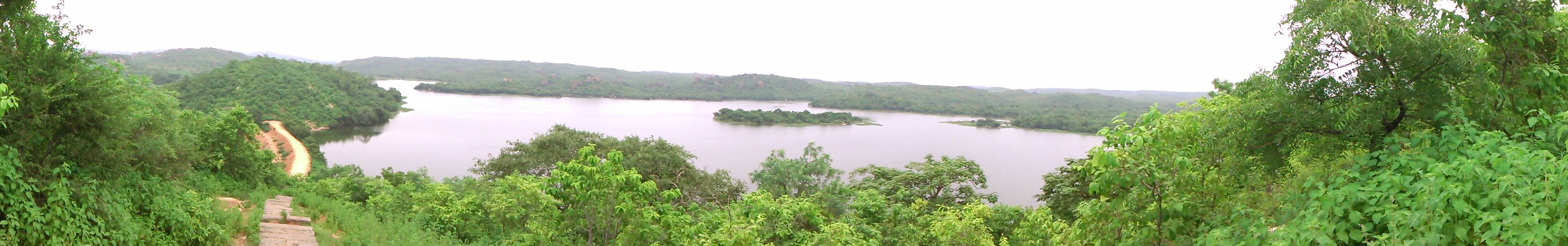
Panoramic view of Alisagar lake. The island can be seen too.
