= Tmcft =

Unit of volume abbreviation

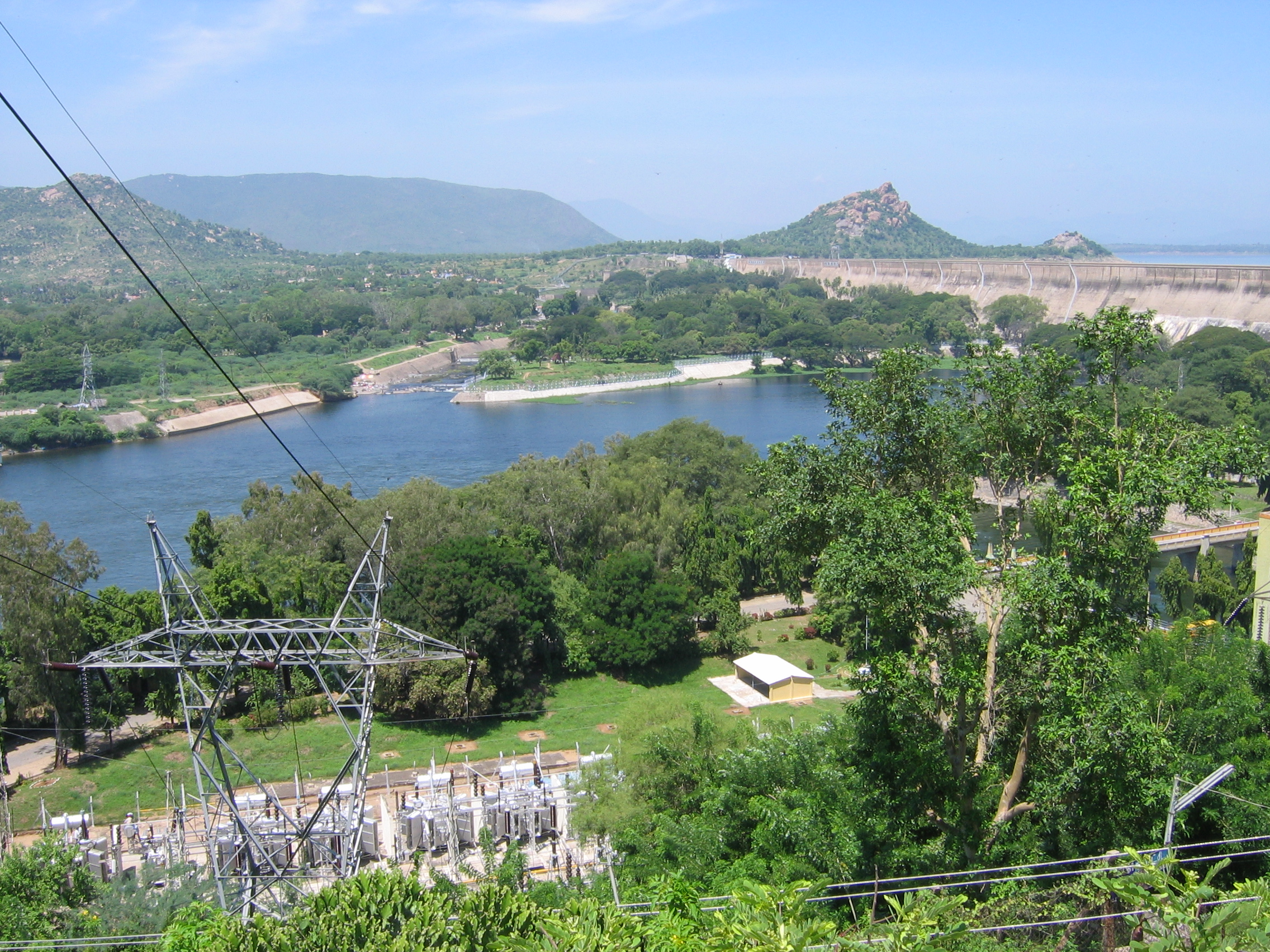
The Mettur Dam has a capacity of 93.4 tmcft

The abbreviation tmcft (also written tmc ft, TMC, or tmc), representing a thousand million cubic feet (one billion = 1,000,000,000 = 10^{9} cubic feet) is commonly used in India in reference to volume of water in a reservoir or river flow.

== Conversion ==
1 tmcft is equivalent to (approximations):

- 28,320,000 cubic metres (m^{3})
- 28.32 gigalitres
- 22,957 acre-feet
- 7.4805 billion US gallons
- 6.2288 billion imperial gallons

Alternatively, 1 cubic kilometre (km^{3}) = 35.32 tmcft is the standard unit used by the Central Water Commission of the Government of India for reporting gross and effective storage capacities of dams in India in National Register of Large Dams (NRLD).

In agriculture, a rough estimate by irrigation experts is that 1 tmc ft water is needed each year to irrigate 4,000 ha (10,000 acres).

The amount of water that can be discharged through a conduit is often expressed in cubic feet per second (cusec).
