= Icchampally Project =

Icchampalli Project
- Location within Telangana Location within India
- Country: India
- Location: Karimnagar district, Telangana
- Coordinates: 18°38′04″N 80°19′26″E
- Purpose: Multi-purpose
- Status: Proposed
- Owners: Joint ownership by Governments of Telangana, Maharashtra & Chhattisgarh
- Operators: Joint control by Governments of Telangana, Maharashtra & Chhattisgarh

Dam and spillways
- Impounds: Godavari River
- Height: 112.770 m (369.98 ft)
- Length: 1,278 m (4,193 ft)
- Spillways: 57 (18 m x 12.37 m Radial Gates)
- Spillway type: Radial Type

Reservoir
- Creates: Icchampalli Reservoir
- Total capacity: 10,375.88 Mm3
- Active capacity: 9,950.23 Mm3
- Surface area: 970 Mm2

Icchampalli Hydro Electric Project
- Operators: Joint control by Governments of Telangana, Maharashtra & Chhattisgarh
- Type: Pumped-storage
- Installed capacity: 875 MW

Icchampally Project (or Inchampalli Project) (Telugu: ఇచ్చంపల్లి) (Marathi: इच्चमपल्ली प्रकल्प) was a multi-purpose project proposed in 2008, with hydro electricity generation, irrigation, flood control, etc. benefits on the River Godavari in India. This project is proposed as joint project of Telangana, Maharashtra and Chhattisgarh states.

== Features ==
The project location is downstream of the point where Indravati River joins Godavari river in Karimnagar district of Telangana. The Nizam of erstwhile Hyderabad State made an unsuccessful attempt in the 1860s to build a river crossing weir (during lean flow period similar to one existing at Dummugudem ) here whose remnants are still existing. However, this dream is not yet fulfilled. Inchampalli reservoir is proposed with 10,374 million m³ (367 tmc) gross storage capacity at Full Reservoir Level (FRL) 112.77 m MSL tentatively. This reservoir would submerge total 926 km^{2} of land in Telangana, Chhattisgarh and Maharashtra states. Most of the area to be submerged is forest land. This project is also envisaged with Pumped-storage hydroelectricity features with tail pond downstream of the dam.

== Icchampally - Cauvery - Grand Anicut Link Project ==
As part of Indian Rivers Inter-link scheme, a link has been proposed to transfer surplus water from Icchampally to Kaveri river, which would culminate at Grand Anicut.

== Interstate Aspects ==
As per the interstate agreement for Inchampalli joint project, Andhra Pradesh (now Telangana) shall bear 78.1% cost of the dam, land & asset acquisition (including that of Maharashtra and Chhattisgarh governments) and rehabilitate the displaced population. But it can draw 2,265 million m³ (80 tmc) from the reservoir and also another 27% (nearly 500 tmc or 14 trillion liters) of water inflows for hydro power generation or irrigation from the reservoir. With this, the only option left for Telangana is to plan lift irrigation projects by using water from the reservoir as most of the cultivable lands in the state are located above the reservoir water level. The interstate agreement is concluded without fixing the FRL of the reservoir and liberty is accorded to Telangana state to decide the FRL keeping cost and benefits sharing percentage same. The agreed terms would be attractive to Telangana only in case the reservoir capacity is of the order of 1,000 tmc. The approximate land submergence is 2,000 km^{2} for 1,000 tmc capacity reservoir.

Inchampalli dam site is favourable to construct a dam with nearly 1,000 tmc storage capacity at FRL 125 m MSL. The river at this point covers nearly 80% of the total catchment’s area with adequate water inflows. This is one of few sites for locating huge storage reservoir in India similar to Aswan Dam (4,600 tmc) in Egypt, Lake Volta (4,200 tmc) in Ghana and Three Gorges Dam (1,350 tmc) in China. Inchampalli reservoir with FRL 125 m MSL would incur very low cost per tmc water storage after meeting the land acquisition and rehabilitation costs at prevailing market rates. Creation of 1,000 tmc storage reservoir at Inchampalli on Godavari River would harness the mighty river water fully ushering India into next phase of green revolution. This reservoir project would also eliminate fully the frequent floods taking place in lower Godavari river basin area in Telangana and Andhra Pradesh.

However, the erstwhile Andhra Pradesh government had tentatively proposed the FRL level 112.77 m MSL, fearing some coal deposits would be submerged above this level. The delay in taking up this project is boon in disguise to Telangana state. Presently underground coal gasification technology is very well developed and in commercial use. This technology is used to exploit coal deposits located deep in the underground (600 meters depth & more), the abandoned underground coal mines and also coal deposits located in seabed. The latest technology adopted from oil & gas wells drilling such as serpentine drilling / in seam drilling, guided drilling, bunching of wells, etc. has made in situ coal gasification technology a reliable and commercial proposition. With underground coal gasification technology, the coal deposits (if any), which got submerged under the reservoir water, can be exploited economically. Moreover, coal deposits are losing importance as this highly pollution causing energy source has become costly compared to abundant and pollution free renewable energy sources such as wind power and solar power in India.

It would be an economical and time saving proposition if this project is constructed by Telangana first up to 95 m MSL with its full capacity hydro electric station and its submergence area limited to river bed in Maharashtra and Chattishgarh states. Later the height of the dam can be gradually increased to its ultimate height at FRL 125 m MSL with the revenue generated from hydro power generation. Alternatively, Kanthanapally ( 18°27′35″N 80°24′57″E ) hydro electric project across the Godavari river located downstream of Inchampalli dam can be constructed up to FRL 95 m MSL with provision to construct Inchampalli dam up to FRL 125 m MSL in future. The reservoir of Kanthalapalli dam would act as tail pond for the pumped storage hydro units of Inchampalli dam in addition to storing substantial river flood water.

Alternate dam location: This project's dam location can be shifted to the downstream side at 18°35′39″N 80°23′20″E near Thupaklagudem village which is also suitable to construct the dam up to FRL 125 m MSL. At this location, both sides of the river is located in Telangana state which would enable to postpone the interstate disputes resolution and take up dam construction without physical hindrance from Chhattisgarh state. Interstate disputes can be resolved at appropriate time during the advanced stage of dam construction. At this location, the dam construction cost (nearly Rs 3000 crores) up to FRL 125 m MSL is less than 10% of the total project cost which includes land acquisition & rehabilitation of displaced people in the submergence area, irrigation canals, water pumping stations, hydro power station, etc. Devadula lift irrigation scheme would also benefit from the relocated Inchampalli dam as it can directly pump water from the Inchampalli reservoir with reduced power consumption due to availability of water at 125 m MSL from the river. However its pump house needs to be relocated to the uplands side.

== See also ==
- Godavari Water Disputes Tribunal
- Polavaram Project
- Underground coal gasification
