= Godavari River Basin Irrigation Projects =

Irrigation project in India

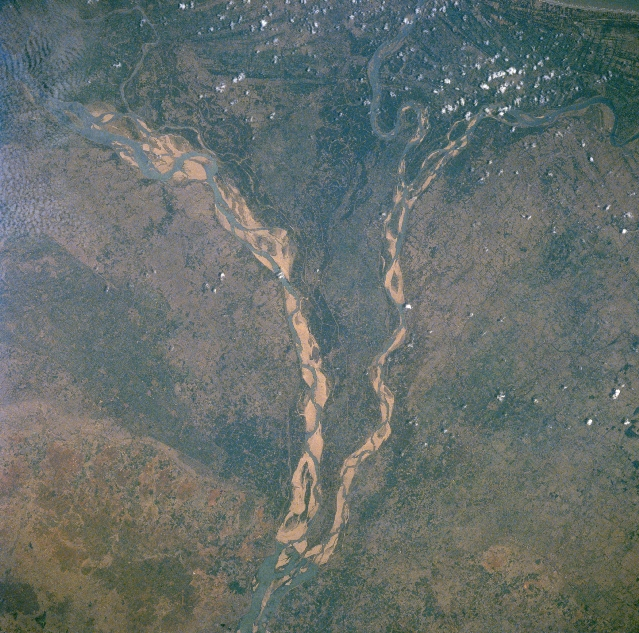
Godavari River Delta

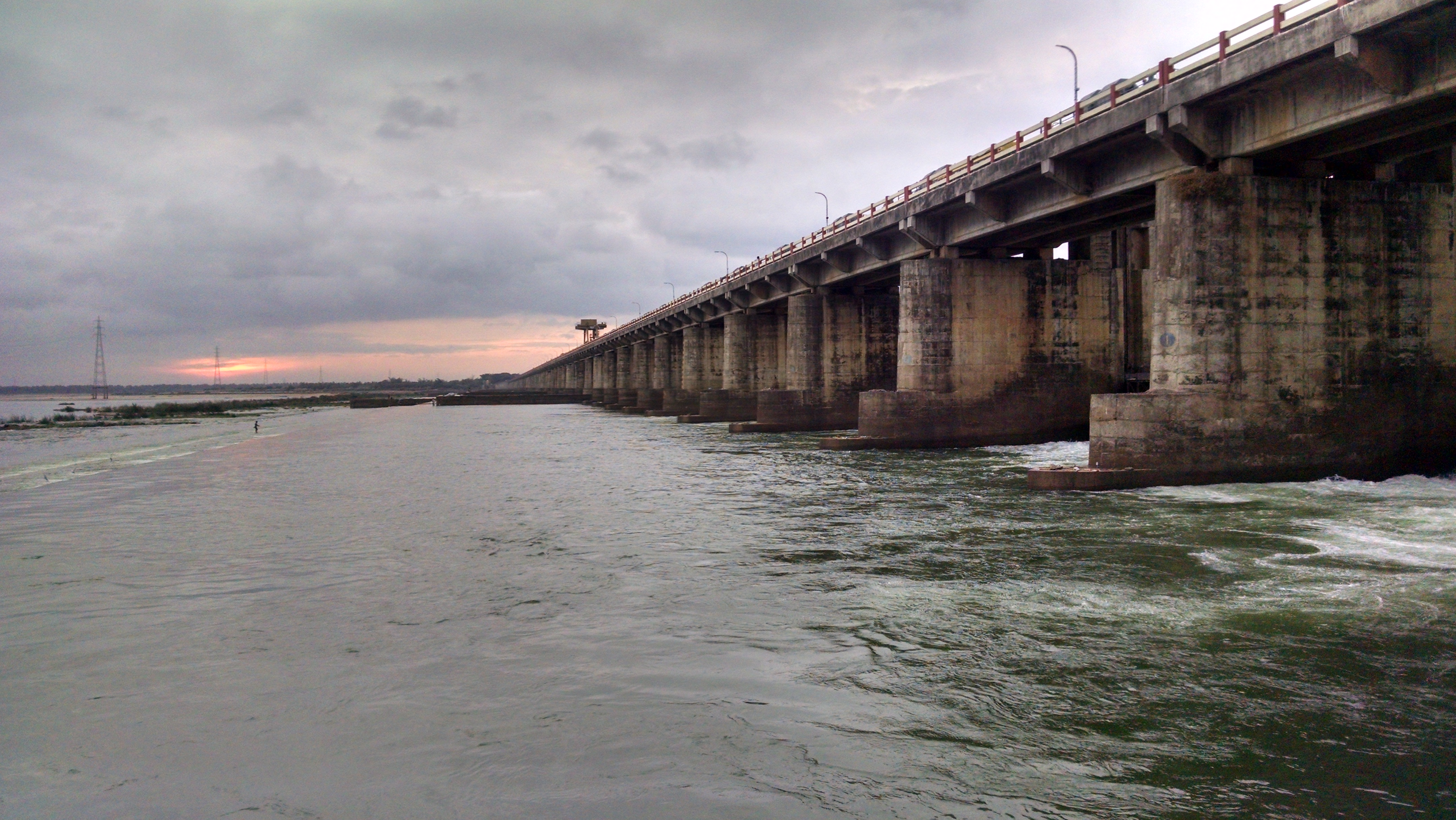
Dowleswaram Barrage near Rajahmundry on River Godavari

The Godavari River has its catchment area in seven states of India: Maharashtra, Telangana, Chhattisgarh, Madhya Pradesh, Andhra Pradesh, Karnataka and Odisha. The number of dams constructed in Godavari basin is the highest among all the river basins in India. Nearly 350 major and medium dams and barrages had been constructed in the river basin by the year 2012.

- Jalaput
- Chintalapudi lift
- Uttarrandhra Sujala Sravanthi lift
- Balimela Reservoir
- Upper Kolab
- Dummugudem Lift Irrigation Schemes
- Nizam Sagar
- Sriram Sagar or Pochampadu
- Kakatiya Canal
- SRSP Flood Flow Canal
- Manjara Dam
- Manjira Reservoir
- Singur Dam
- Shanigaram Reservoir
- Lower Manair Dam
- Mid Manair Dam
- Upper Manair Dam
- Yellampally
- Taliperu Project
- Babli barrage or Babhali
- Devadula lift irrigation project
- Polavaram Project
- Inchampalli Project
- Sadarmat

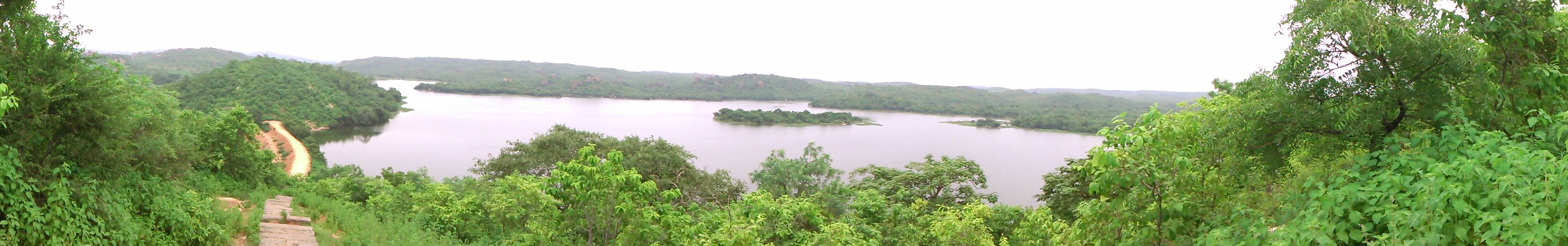
Panoramic view of Alisagar lake.

- Alisagar lift irrigation scheme
- Kaddam
- Sri Komaram Bheem Project
- Lower Tirna
- Siddeshwar or Purna
- Yeldari Dam
- Godavari Canal
- Mula Dam
- Bhandardara Dam
- Isapur Dam or Upper Penganga
- Upper Dudhana Dam
- Jayakwadi or Paithan
- Upper Pravara
- Upper Indravati dam
- Upper Wain Ganga (Bheemgarh Dam)
- Upper Wardha Dam
- Lower Wardha Dam
- Majalgaon Dam
- Ghatghar Dam
- Upper Vaitarna Dam
- Vishnupuri Barrage
- Sirpur Dam or Bagh reservoir
- Gosi kd Dam or Gosi Kund dam
- Totladoh Dam
- Yeldari Dam
- Kamthikhairy Dam or Pench dam
- Erai Dam
- Tultuli Dam
- Arunawati Dam
- Lower Wunna Dam or Wadgaon
- Manar Dam
- Lower Pus Dam
- Ramtek Dam
- Pench diversion Project, Madhya Pradesh

== See also ==
- River Basins in Madhya Pradesh
- Godavari Water Disputes Tribunal
- List of dams and reservoirs in Maharashtra
- List of dams and reservoirs in Andhra Pradesh
- List of dams and reservoirs in Telangana
- List of dams and reservoirs in India
