= Nagpur metropolitan area =

Nagpur Metropolitan Area (Greater Nagpur)
- Metropolitan region
- Interactive map of Nagpur Metropolitan Area (Greater Nagpur)
- Country: India
- State: Maharashtra
- District: Nagpur
- Talukas: Nagpur (Rural); Kamthi; Hingna; Parseoni; Mauda; Savner (Part); Umred (Part); Kalameshwar (Part); Kuhi (Part)

Area
  - Metro: 3,780 km^{2} (1,460 sq mi)
- Time zone: UTC+5.30 (IST)
- Development Authority: NMRDA - Nagpur Metropolitan Region Development Authority
- Chairman: Eknath Shinde, CM; Government of Maharashtra
- Metropolitan Commissioner: Shri. ManojKumar Suryawanshi (IAS)

The Nagpur metropolitan area or Greater Nagpur is a metropolitan area in Indian state of Maharashtra.

== History ==
In 1999, a notification was sent out by the State of Maharashtra announced the Nagpur Metropolitan Area, comprising Nagpur City, Nagpur Gramin, Hingna, Parshivni, Mauda, Kamptee taluka and parts of Savner, Kalmeshwar, Umred and Kuhi talukas. The boundaries of the metro region around the municipal corporation limits of the city were described, and the Mumbai metropolitan area and Pune metro areas were declared.

Later on a notification dt. 24 December 2002, the government extended the jurisdiction of NIT outside the NMC limit under clause 1(2) of NIT Act-1936 as "Nagpur Metropolitan Area" in connection to notification of 1999 which ranges approximately 25 to 40 km area away from NMC limit.

== Objectives of metro region planning ==
- Laying down broad policies and directions of growth in the principal zones
- Determining the hierarchy of roads and access ways in coordination with existing roads proposed D. P. roads
- Establishing the zoning of land use on the lands falling within 25 to 40 km are of the township
- Determining the standards for common facilities like education health and social facilities for the resident population
- Ensuring planned development in fringe areas

== Planning area under metro region ==
Area of Nagpur district	9810 km^{2}
Area proposed for metro region	25 to 40 km
Area under Nagpur municipal limit	3780 km^{2}
Area under Nagpur City municipal limit	216 km^{2}

== Two phases of proposed metro region ==
NIT proposed the metro region plan in two phases:

- Phase I: Area - 1520 km^{2} (i.e. boundary of R. P.)
- Phase II: Area - 2260 km^{2}

NIT is framing the policy for metro region planning and once the plan is finalised, different town planning schemes will be taken up for development.
