= Manur =

- Village
- Location within Maharashtra
- Coordinates: 19.169005°N 76.235418°E
- Country: India
- State: Maharashtra
- District: Beed
- Taluka: Majalgaon

Government
  - Type: Gram Panchayat

Population
  - Total: 2,035
- Demonym: Manurkar

Languages
  - Official: Marathi
- Time zone: UTC+5:30 (IST)
- Postal Index Number: 431131
- Area code: +91-2443
- Vehicle registration: MH 44/MH 23
- Lok Sabha: Beed (Lok Sabha constituency)
- Vidhan Sabha: Majalgaon (Vidhan Sabha constituency)

Manur is a village in Majalgaon Taluka in the Indian state of Maharashtra. Manur is known for Renuka Devi Temple as well as Tulajabhavani Temple.

It is located only 2 km away from Majalgaon City. The Sindphana River flows through Manur Village, therefore land of manur is to be horticulture farm.
