= Kunwara bhimsen =

Village in Maharashtra

Kunwara bhivsen is a small village in the Parseoni tahsil, 28.969 km. (18 miles) north of Nagpur on the bank of the river Pench.

A hill by the village contains the remains of an old fort, its summit being encircled with walls made of ponderous masses of rock. The lines of defence over the pathway leading up the hillside are constructed with some skill and are attributed by the people to the Gonds. There is a temple dedicated to Bhivsen. Nearby, there is a well, which is 3.048 metres (10 ft.) deep and 3.048 metres (10 ft.) wide. Though the well is so shallow, surprisingly enough it does not dry up.
