= Kalambha =

Village in Maharashtra

Coordinates: 21°21′45″N 78°34′05″E

Kalambha is a small village of the Nagpur district of Maharashtra, India.
