= Kudunuru =

Coordinates: 17°59′N 80°53′E

- Village
- Interactive map of Kudunuru
- Country: India
- State: Telangana
- District: Khammam

Languages
  - Official: Telugu
- Time zone: UTC+5:30 (IST)
- Climate: hot (Köppen)

Kudunuru is a small village in the Cherla mandal of the Khammam district in Telangana. The Godavari River is located nearby.
