= Parseoni =

- Town
- Location in Maharashtra, India
- Coordinates: 21°23′N 79°09′E
- Country: India
- State: Maharashtra
- Region: Vidharba
- District: Nagpur

Government
  - Type: Nagar Panchayat

Population (2011)
  - Total: 143,019

Languages
  - Official: Marathi
- Time zone: UTC+5:30 (IST)
- PIN: 441105
- Vehicle registration: MH-40

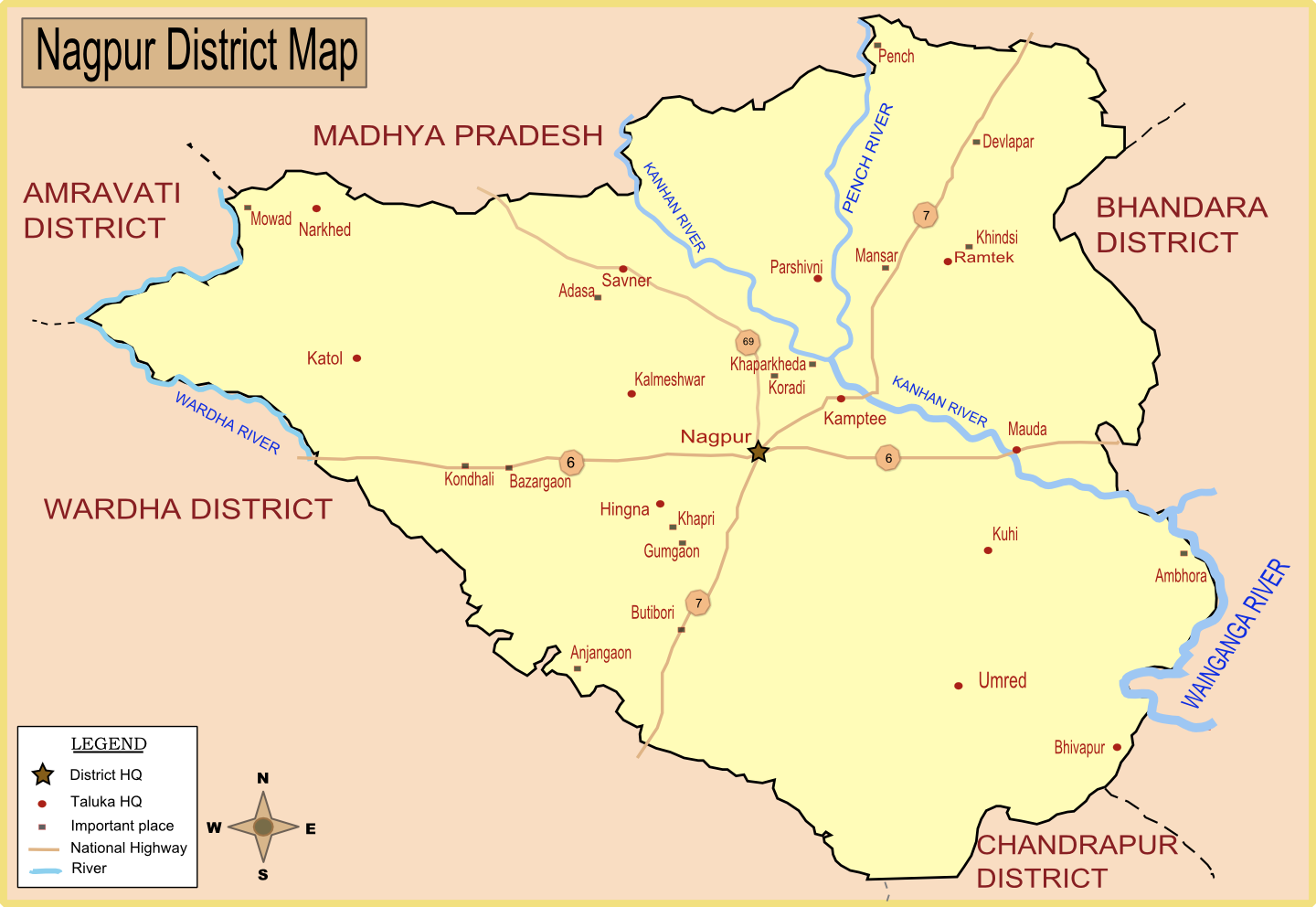
Map of Nagpur district showing Parseoni.

Parseoni is a town and a tehsil in Ramtek subdivision of Nagpur district in Nagpur revenue Division in the Berar region in the state of Maharashtra, India.

It is located on the banks of Pench River.

== Demographic ==
As per Indian government census 2011, the population was 1,43,019.

Year	Male	Female	Total Population	Change	Religion (%)							
Year	Male	Female	Total Population	Change	Hindu	Muslim	Christian	Sikhs	Buddhist	Jain	Other religions and persuasions	Religion not stated
2001	73128	68603	141731	-	84.841	2.584	0.402	0.262	11.521	0.262	0.043	0.085
2011	73170	69849	143019	0.909	84.724	2.679	0.371	0.223	11.134	0.176	0.536	0.157

The main occupation in Parseoni is agriculture. Agriculture in Parseoni tehsil mainly consists of cotton, rice, and wheat in small quantities. Even though Nagpur is famous for oranges, this area is a small producer of oranges. The agricultural land receives water from Pench dam impoundment and monsoon water.

== Pench Prakalp ==
Pench Dam on Pench River is biggest dam in Nagpur district after Totladoh dam. Both are north of the town known as Pench Project or Pench Prakalp. Water from the dam impoundment is use for irrigation in large parts of the Parseoni, Kalmeshwar, Kamthi, Savner, Ramtek, Mauda, and Kuhi tehsils.

This dam also supplies a large part of the drinking water to Nagpur city. Koradi and Khaparkheda power plants also receive water from the dam impoundment; hence, many farmers face water shortage for irrigation in those years when rainfall is low.
