= Satyanarayanapuram =

- village
- Location in Telangana, India Satyanarayanapuram (India)
- Coordinates: 17°35′0″N 80°7′41″E
- Country: India
- State: Telangana
- District: Khammam

Languages
  - Official: Telugu
- Time zone: UTC+5:30 (IST)
- PIN: 507140
- Telephone code: 08747
- Vehicle registration: TS
- Coastline: 0 kilometres (0 mi)
- Nearest city: bhadrachalam
- Lok Sabha constituency: mehabubabad
- Avg. summer temperature: 45 °C (113 °F)
- Avg. winter temperature: 25 °C (77 °F)
- Website: telangana.gov.in

Satyanarayanapuram is a village in Cherla mandal, in Khammam district, Telangana.
