= Pix Transmissions =

Indian belt manufacturing company

Pix Transmissions Ltd
- Company type: Public
- Traded as: BSE: 500333; NSE: PIXTRANS
- Industry: Belt manufacturer
- Founded: Mumbai, Maharashtra, India (1981; 45 years ago)
- Headquarters: Mumbai, Maharashtra, India
- Area served: Worldwide
- Revenue: ▲INR 4 billion (2021)
- Subsidiaries: PIX Europe Limited; PIX Germany GmbH; PIX Middle East Trading LLC
- Website: pixtrans.com

Pix Transmissions Ltd (PTL) is an Indian manufacturer of belts and related mechanical transmission products. Headquartered in Mumbai, Maharashtra, the company has manufacturing facilities in Hingna and Nagalwadi, Nagpur.

In 2021, PTL reported consolidated revenue of INR 4 billion. The company has also listed in the Bombay Stock Exchange in the year 1989.

== History ==
PTL started its operations in 1981 in Nagpur, Maharashtra. In 1999, the company established a new manufacturing facility and began production of Timing, Raw Edge Cogged, and Poly-V Belts.

The company has manufacturing units in Hingna and Nagalwadi, Nagpur. The Nagalwadi facility is an automated polymer mixing facility.

PTL commenced operations in the UK, Germany, and UAE by establishing subsidiaries and joint ventures, such as PIX Europe Limited, PIX Germany GmbH, and PIX Middle East Trading LLC.

In 2021, the company announced its foray into the automotive segment with the launch of PIX Force.

== R&D facilities ==
The company has its R&D centers located at Nagalwadi Plant, Nagpur.

- Plant I: Hingna MIDC
- Plant II: TRP plant, Nagalwadi, Nagpur
- Plant III: MEC plant, Nagalwadi, Nagpur
- Plant IV: Pix logistics hub

== Awards and achievements ==
- Export Promotion Council Govt. of India
- Niryat Shree Award from the president of India
