= Sillewada =

- Census town
- Location in Maharashtra, India
- Coordinates: 21.3015°N 79.1225°E
- Country: India
- State: Maharashtra
- District: Nagpur

Population (2001)
  - Total: 8,503

Languages
  - Official: Marathi
- Time zone: UTC+5:30 (IST)

Sillewada is a census town in Nagpur district in the Indian state of Maharashtra. It is a coal mine town with Western Coalfields Limited having several mines in and around the place.

== Demographics ==
As of 2001 India census, Sillewada had a population of 8503. Males constitute 53% of the population and females 47%. Sillewada has an average literacy rate of 75%, higher than the national average of 59.5%: male literacy is 80%, and female literacy is 69%. In Sillewada, 12% of the population is under 6 years of age.

Year	Male	Female	Total Population	Change	Religion (%)							
Year	Male	Female	Total Population	Change	Hindu	Muslim	Christian	Sikhs	Buddhist	Jain	Other religions and persuasions	Religion not stated
2001	4530	3973	8503	-	79.054	13.419	0.706	0.106	6.668	0.000	0.047	0.000
2011	3867	3423	7290	-14.266	79.150	14.595	0.576	0.329	5.144	0.082	0.000	0.123
