= Nagpur Improvement Trust =

Indian urban development authority

- नागपूर सुधार प्रन्यास
- Abbreviation: NIT
- Location: Nagpur, India
- Chairman: Sanjay Meena
- Website: nitnagpur.org

Nagpur Improvement Trust (NIT) (Marathi: नागपूर सुधार प्रन्यास [नासुप्र]) is an urban development authority with the task of developing new areas within the city limits of Nagpur, India and maintaining existing city infrastructure. This trust works along with Nagpur Municipal Corporation (NMC) which is an elected body of city representatives (Corporation). NIT itself is not a democratically elected civic body and has members appointed in it from various levels like Government of Maharashtra, NMC and other representatives of Nagpur. NIT thus has a small management body as compared to NMC. NIT holds the planning and development authority for Nagpur but does not receive any funds from state government. Funds needed for development work are raised by NIT through the auction of newly developed areas.

== Overview ==
NIT has played a major role in the expansion and maintaining Nagpur in its past 65+ years of work. However, the existence of NIT alongside NMC has been criticized several times as a violation of constitution of India. Several Chief Ministers of Maharashtra and former Governor of Maharashtra tried to abolish this agency but did not succeed. The argument is that the Constitution of India allows only democratically elected bodies to carry out the work of civic administration. Since NIT is not such a body, it has been demanded by several political bodies to abolish the NIT Act of 1936 or to merge NIT with NMC. It has been claimed that due to political reasons state government has failed to take any action till now. However, there are similar organizations like the Mumbai Metropolitan and Area Development Authority (MMRDA), Delhi Development Authority (DDA) and several such agencies that are functioning in the country today and the argument of NIT not fulfilling constitutional requirements has not been substantiated in the courts of law.

== History ==
Nagpur is an important city in central India and during days of British Raj two separate committees were formed to look after city's development. The Nagpur Municipal Committee was established in 1864. The Civil Station Sub-Committee was established in 1884. In 1928, the Municipal Committee passed a resolution for creating an "Improvement Trust" for Nagpur which was established in 1937 under the Nagpur Improvement Trust Act, 1936. NIT began functioning in 1937 and has collateral jurisdiction over the areas within the limits of the town wherever schemes are prepared by the trust and approved by the government.

After Indian independence, the Town Planning Department was established in 1947 under Central Provinces and Berar State Town Planning Expert with head office at Nagpur. The Department functioned under the administrative control of the local Self-Government Department. The Central Provinces and Berar Town Planning Act was enacted in 1948 and the Central Provinces and Berar Regulation of Uses of Land Act was also enacted in the same year to provide for the making and execution of town planning schemes and to regulate the development of areas with the object of securing proper sanitary conditions, amenities and convenience to persons living in such areas and in neighboring areas.

Later with creation of Maharashtra, Nagpur became part of Maharashtra. A new branch office of this department came into existence at Nagpur for the four districts of Nagpur, Chandrapur, Wardha and Bhandara. The Nagpur department continued to function along with NMC.

== Organization ==
NIT is governed by a board of trustees. The board consists of nine trustees, of which five are elected representatives of the local and state government and four are from the Central and State civil services:

- Elected Representatives from Nagpur Municipal Corporation (NMC) and Maharashtra Legislative Assembly
  - A Member of the Legislative Assembly (India) of the who is a resident of Nagpur
  - Three members appointed by the Government of Maharashtra
  - Chairman of Standing Committee of NMC
  - A Corporator nominated by NMC General body
- Civil Servants
  - A Chairman, who is a senior Indian Administrative Service (IAS) officer (currently Manoj Kumar Suryawanshi)
  - Commissioner of NMC
  - Joint Director, Town Planning, Nagpur Division
- Trustee :- Shri Vikas Pandurangji Thakre
- General Manager :- Shri Nishikant Suke

== Work ==
The major responsibilities of NIT include - housing schemes, rebuilding of certain city pockets, maintaining city streets, drainage, sanitation, and other city improvement schemes.

The NIT act of 1936 allows NIT to acquire land from surrounding rural areas to develop into new urban layouts. Money needed to acquire these lands and develop them is recovered back by the auction to general public when they are ready. Once a new area of the city is developed by NIT it is handed back to NMC for maintenance. NMC then recovers the money in form of various taxes from the residents of which two percent is given back to NIT. NIT in turn has the responsibility to provide drinking water and sewage disposal for these areas. NIT also distributes significant land acquired to weaker sections of the society at considerably lower rates. NIT also undertakes the work of regularization of unauthorized residential zones. NIT is also responsible for maintaining the 8 major gardens and 40 mini gardens in Nagpur. Various lakes and city monuments that come under the jurisdiction of local bodies are maintained by NIT.

In 2007, NIT unveiled the plans for setting up the Nagpur Metropolitan Region Development Authority (NMRDA). NIT was given the status of development authority by the state government and it has identified a total area of 3780 km^{2} for the Greater Nagpur Metropolitan Area excluding the area under NMC limits. The first phase of this Nagpur Metropolitan Region is to cover 1,520 km^{2} of area.

== See also ==
- Nagpur Municipal Corporation
- Nagpur Metropolitan Region Development Authority
