= Bindusara River =

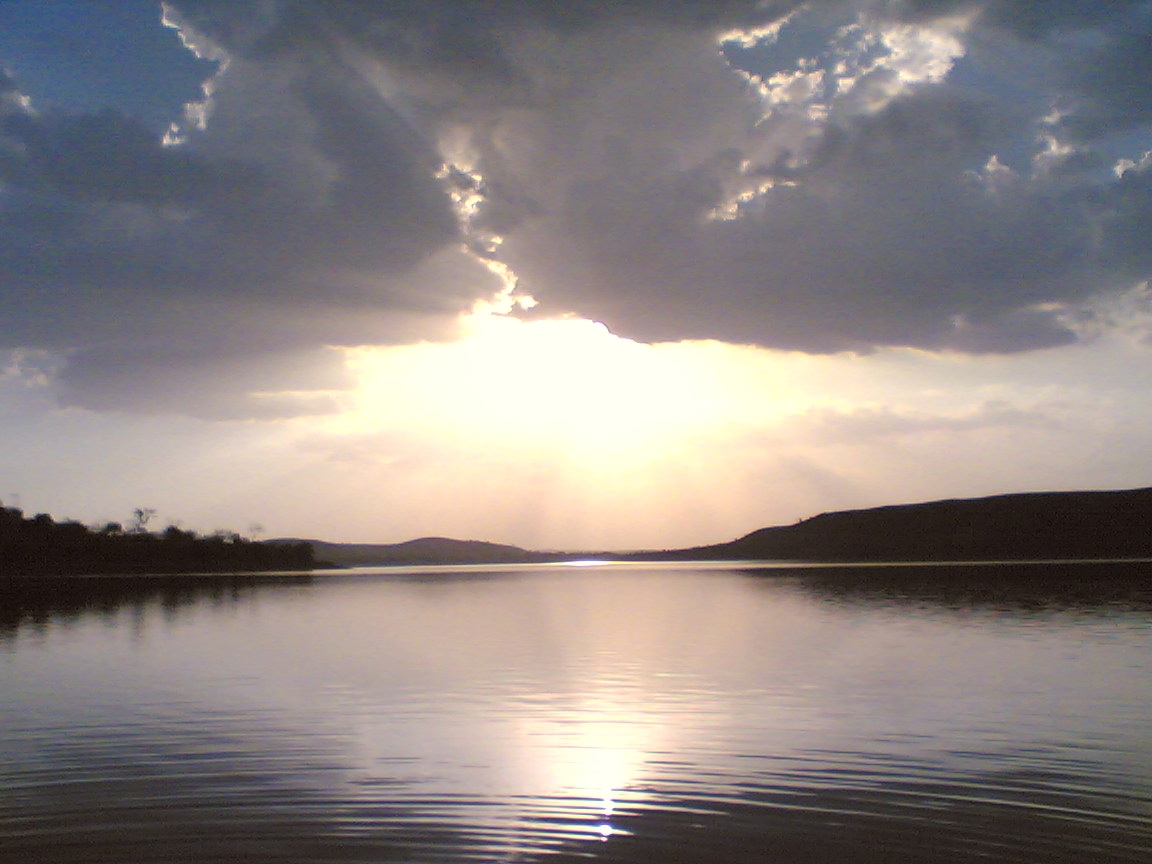

Location
- Country: India
- State: Maharashtra
- District: Beed

Physical characteristics
- Source
  - location: Balaghat Range, India
- Length: 40 km (25 mi)

Bindusara (also called Bendsura) is a 40-km long river in the district of Beed in Maharashtra state of India. It is a tributary of the Sindphana and a sub-tributary of Godavari river.

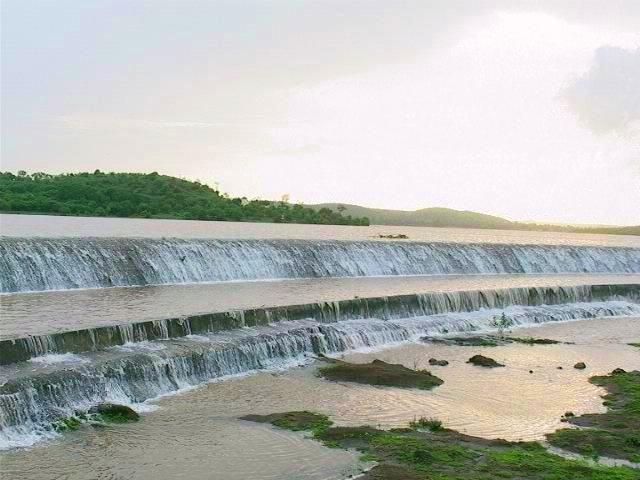
Bendsura dam overflowing in monsoon. Balaghat Range can be seen in the background.

Bindusara originates in the hills of Balaghat near the village Waghira, in south of district Beed in Patoda taluqa. There are hills nearby. The river receives its water from numerous little streams. On the banks of the Bindusara River is where the city of Beed is located.

Bendsura is a rapid and seasonal river. A reservoir; Bendsura Project (gross capacity 7.90, live capacity 7.106 million cubic metres) was constructed on the river in 1955 near the village of Pāli, about 10 km south of Beed.

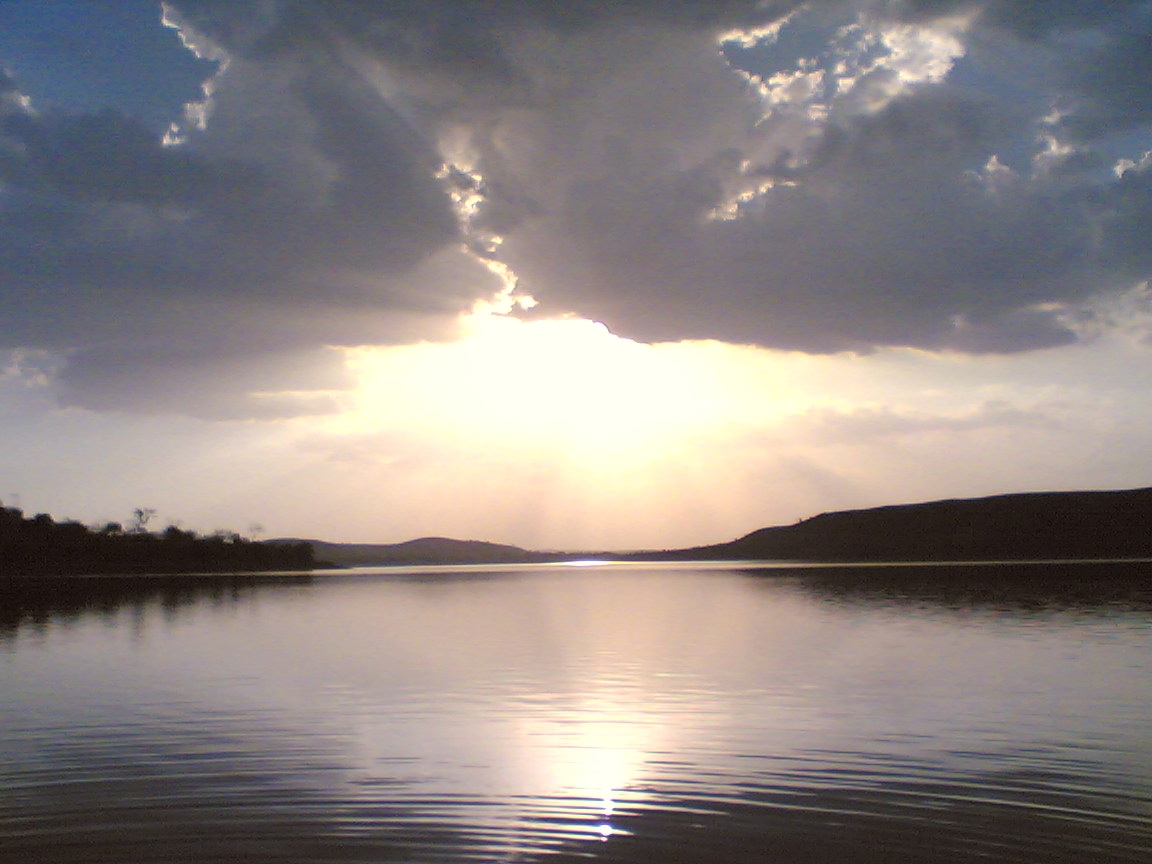
A cloudy evening at Bendsura dam

At some places the river is narrow and looks like a stream. The lack of vegetation and rocky and undulating terrain contributes to violent floods in heavy rains. These have repeatedly caused substantial loss of property and life in the history of Beed town, most recently on July 23, 1989, when a massive flooding of three habitations in the town caused a number of dead or missing and property losses of millions of rupees.

Bendsura river flows from south to north and meets Sindphana river, about 10 km north of Beed town. Total length of the river is about 40 km.

== See also ==
- List of rivers of India
- Rivers of India
