= Ambhora =

Village in Maharashtra

- Village
- Location in Maharashtra, India
- Coordinates: 21°00′40″N 79°35′43″E
- Country: India
- State: Maharashtra
- District: Nagpur
- Taluka: Kuhi 441210
- Founder: chaitanya varma

Population (2011)
  - Total: 620

Languages
  - Official: Marathi
- Time zone: UTC+5:30 (IST)

Ambhora is a village situated in the Kuhi taluka of Nagpur district in the Indian state of Maharashtra. As of the 2011 Indian census, it had a population of 530.

Ambhora-a place in Kuhi Tahsil of Nagpur is very scenic place. The five rivers namely Wainganga, Kanhan, Aam, Kolari and Murza meet here.The nearby Ambhora Bridge (seen in the photo under construction in 2023) crosses the Wainganga River, now the main arm of the Gosikhurd Dam reservoir. The bridge is located at 21°02′02″N 79°36′45″E.
