= Majalgaon =

- City
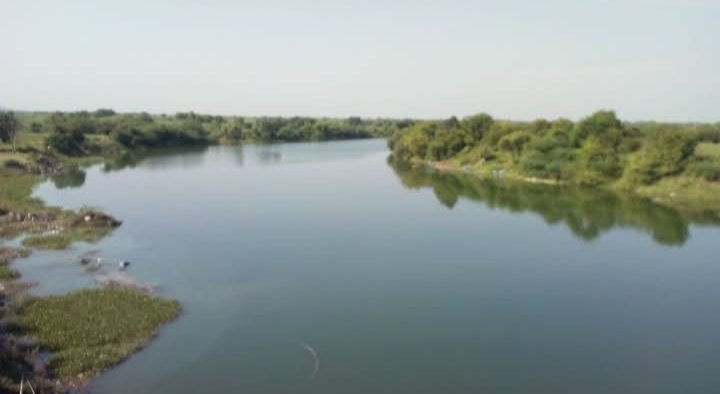
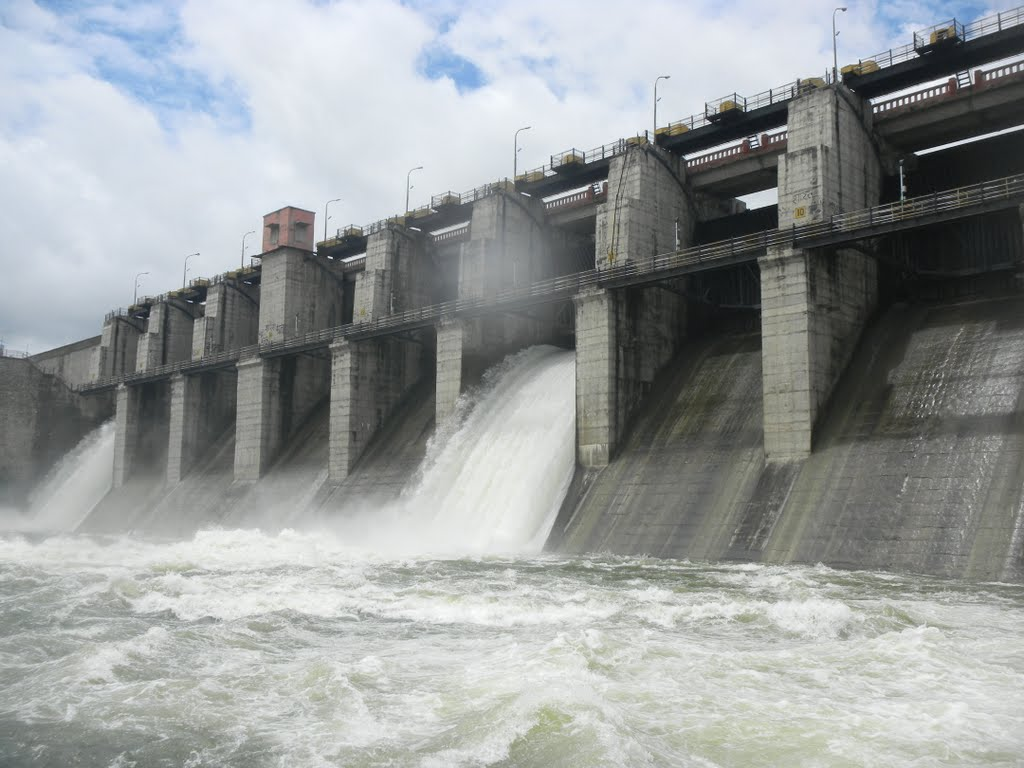
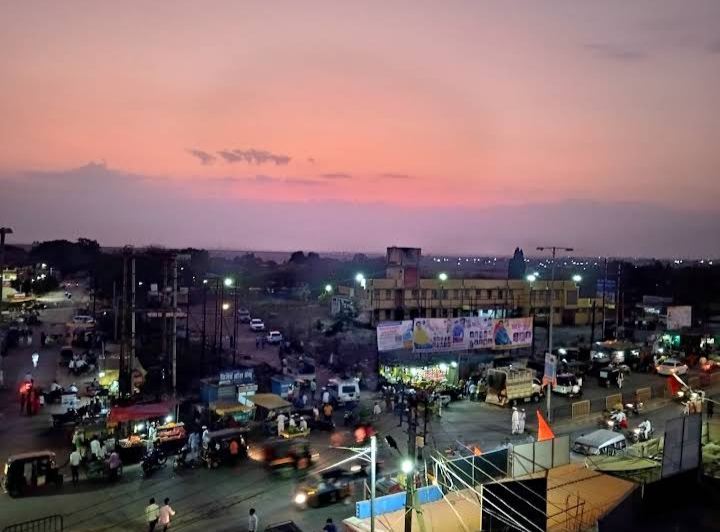
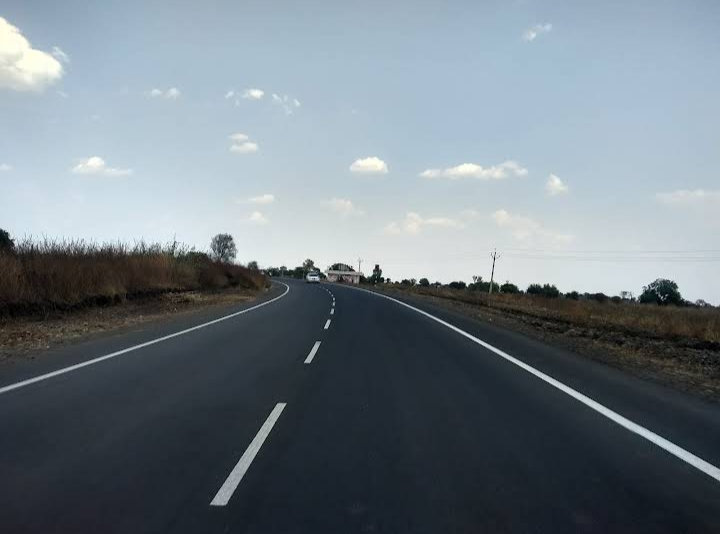
- From Top, then left to right: Sindphana River, Majalgaon Dam, City Bus Station, National Highway 61

- Location in Maharashtra, India Majalgaon (India) Majalgaon (Asia)
- Coordinates: 19.15°N 76.2333°E
- Country: India
- State: Maharashtra
- Region: Marathwada
- Division: Aurangabad
- District: Beed

Government
  - Type: Municipal council
  - Body: Majalgaon Assembly constituency
  - MLA: Prakashdada Solanke

Area
  - Total: 35.08 km^{2} (13.54 sq mi)

Population (2011)
  - Total: 49,453
  - Density: 1,410/km^{2} (3,651/sq mi)
- Demonym: Majalgaonkar

Languages
  - Official: Marathi
- Time zone: UTC+5:30 (IST)
- PIN: 431131
- Telephone code: 91-2443
- Vehicle registration: MH-44; MH-23
- Sex ratio: 923.54 ♀/1000♂
- Literacy: 72.2%
- Distance from Mumbai: 418 kilometres (260 mi) E (land)
- Climate: BSh (Köppen)
- Avg. summer temperature: 45 °C (113 °F)
- Avg. winter temperature: 15 °C (59 °F)
- Website: majalgaonmahaulb.maharashtra.gov.in

Majalgaon is a municipal council in Beed district in the Indian state of Maharashtra. It is the headquarters of the Majalgaon taluka of Beed district. Majalgaon is situated at northestern side of Beed district.

The Majalgaon Dam has been constructed across the Sindphana river, which is a major tributary of the Godawari river. This dam and the Majalgaon Right Bank Canal are components of the Jayakwadi Project Stage II. The project was approved by the government of Maharashtra in 1976 for an estimated cost of ₹5,433 lakhs.

== Demographics ==
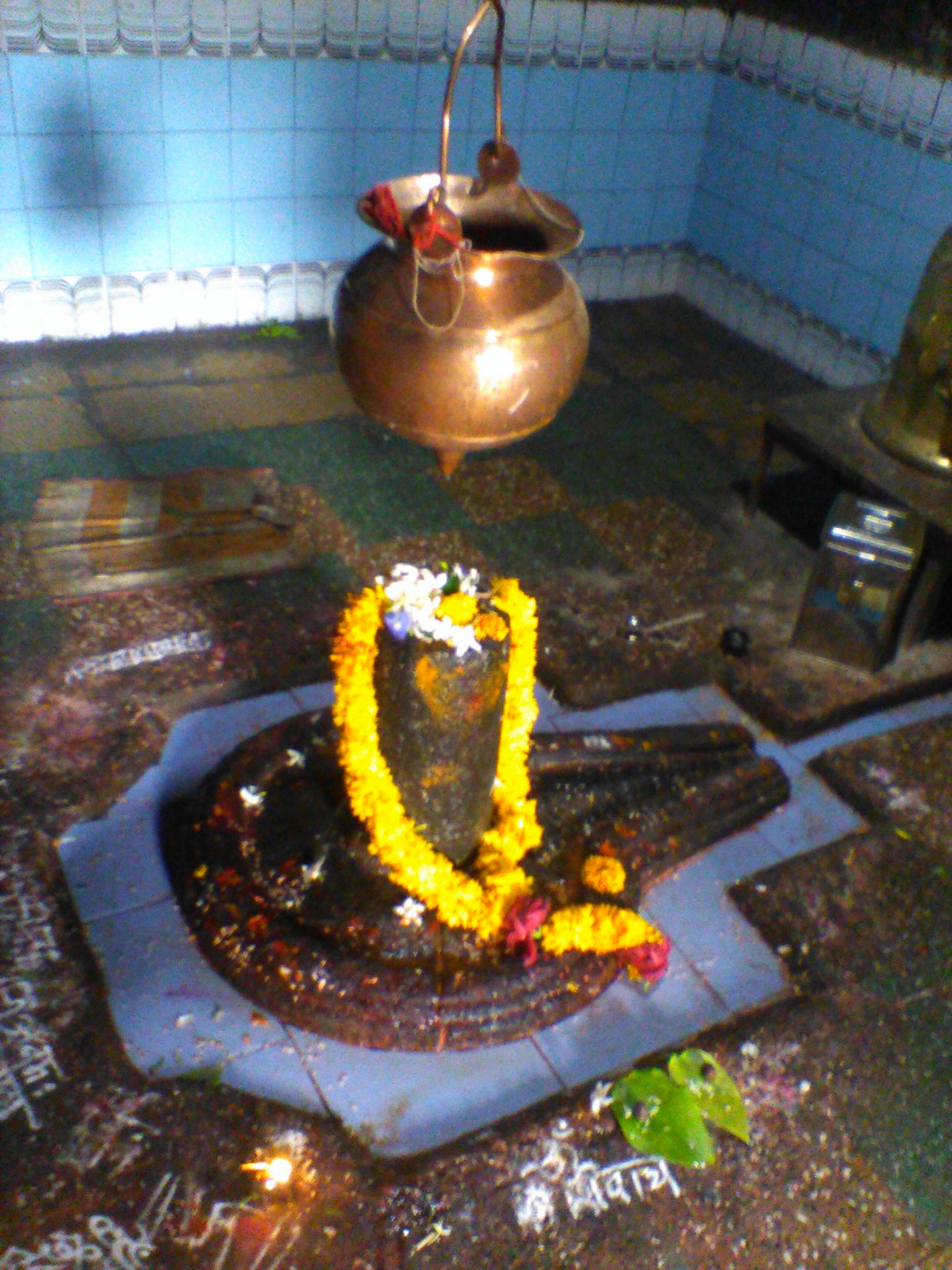
Shiddheswar temple in Majalgaon

Religions in Majalgaon
| Religion | Percent |
| Hindus | 55.92% |
| Muslims | 35.59% |
| Buddhists | 7.38% |
| Christians | 0.10% |
| Jains | 1.7% |
| Others† | 0.23% |
Distribution of religions †Includes Sikhs (0.2%).

As of 2011 India census, Majalgaon had a population of 49,453. Males constitute 51% of the population and females 49%. Majalgaon has an average literacy rate of 72%, higher than the national average.male literacy is 79%, and female literacy is 65%. In Majalgaon, 15% of the population is under 6 years of age.

== See also ==
- Sundarrao Solanke
- Majalgaon Dam
