= Kamptee taluka =

Kamptee taluka is a taluka of Nagpur district in Maharashtra state, India. It covers an area of 40,700 hectare, and as of 2001 had a population of 209,003, 126,097 of whom were urban dwellers, and 82,906 were rural. The administrative center of the taluka is the city of Kamptee. It is also a part of Nagpur metropolitan region.

== Panchayat villages ==
Kamptee taluka is divided into forty-eight panchayat villages, each of which oversees one or more villages. The panchayat villages are:

- Aadka
- Aajni
- Aawandhi
- Babhulkheda
- Bhamewada
- Bhilgaon
- Bhowri
- Bhugaon
- Bidgao

Bidgav

- Bina
- Chikhali
- Chikna
- Dighori
- Gada
- Garla
- Ghorpad
- Gumthala
- Gumthi
- Jakhegaon
- Kadholi
- Kapsi (BU)
- Kawtha
- Kem
- Kesuri
- Khairi
- Khapa
- Khasala
- Khedi
- Koradi
- Lihigaon
- Lonkhairi
- Mahadula
- Mahalgaon
- Nanha
- Neri
- Parsad
- Pawangaon
- Ranala
- Shiwni
- Sonegaon
- Suradevi
- Tarodi (BU)
- Temsna
- Umri
- Wadodha
- Warambha
- Waregaon
- Yerkheda
