= Totladoh Dam =

Totladoh dam
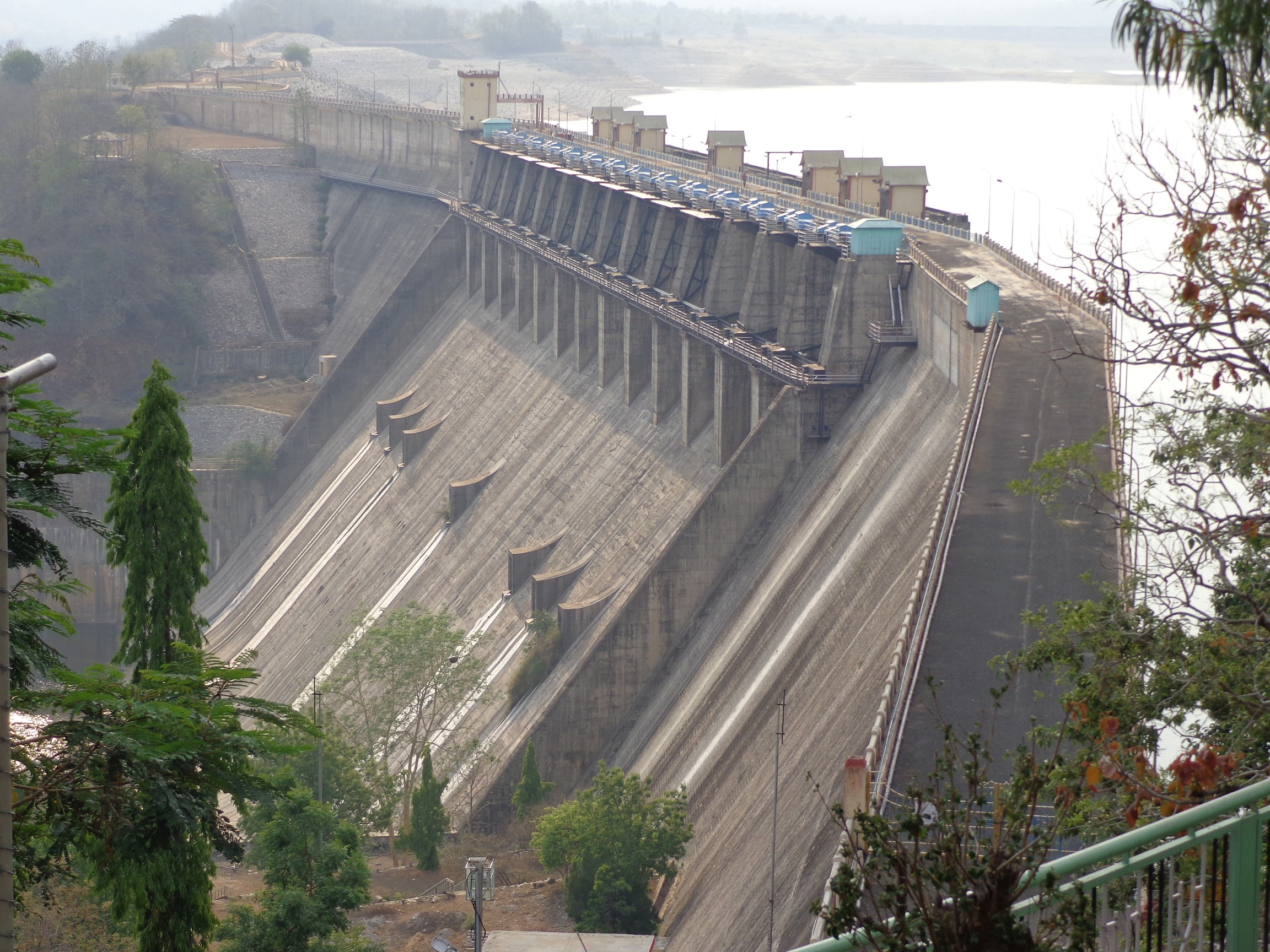

- Location within Maharashtra
- Official name: Totladoh dam D05107
- Location: Ramtek
- Coordinates: 21.658385°N 79.294167°E
- Opening date: 1989
- Owner: Government of Maharashtra

Dam and spillways
- Type of dam: Gravity
- Impounds: Pench river
- Height: 74.5 m (244 ft)
- Length: 680 m (2,230 ft)
- Dam volume: 972×10^{3} m^{3} (34.3×10^{6} cu ft)

Reservoir
- Total capacity: 1,241×10^{6} m^{3} (43.8×10^{9} cu ft)
- Surface area: 77.710 km^{2} (30.004 sq mi)

Power Station
- Installed capacity: 160 MW

Totladoh dam, is a gravity dam on the Pench river near Ramtek in Nagpur district in the state of Maharashtra and adjoining Madhya Pradesh in India.

== Specifications ==
The height of the dam above lowest foundation is 74.5 m (244 ft) while the length is 680 m (2,230 ft). The volume content is 972×10^{3} m^{3} (34.3×10^{6} cu ft) and live storage capacity is 1.091 km^{3} (0.262 cu mi).

== Purpose ==
160 MW hydroelectric plant called Pench Hydro power station is located at the foot of the dam.

== See also ==
- Dams in Maharashtra
- Godavari River Basin Irrigation Projects
- List of reservoirs and dams in India
- List of power stations in India
- Top 5 Dams in Maharashtra
- Money
