= Taliperu Project =

- Location within Telangana
- Official name: తాలిపేరు ప్రాజెక్ట్ Taliperu Project
- Location: Cherla, Khammam District, Telangana, India
- Coordinates: 18°6′10″N 80°51′55″E
- Purpose: Irrigation
- Status: Operational
- Opening date: 1985
- Construction cost: Rs 52.98 crores

Dam and spillways
- Type of dam: Earth fill dam
- Impounds: Taliperu River
- Height: 25 metres (82 ft) above lowest foundation
- Length: 2,762 metres (9,062 ft)
- Spillways: 25
- Spillway type: Ogee crest
- Spillway capacity: 53043 Cusec

Reservoir
- Creates: Taliperu Reservoir
- Total capacity: 0.73 Tmcft
- Active capacity: 0.51 Tmcft
- Catchment area: 24000 Acres

Taliperu Project (Telugu:తాలిపేరు ప్రాజెక్ట్) also known as Taliperu Reservoir is a medium irrigation project constructed across the Taliperu River, a tributary of Godavari River, located at Cherla Village and Mandal, Khammam District, Telangana. This project utilizes about 5.0 TMC of water and creates 24,500 acres (9,900 ha) of Ayacut in both Cherla and Dummugudem Mandals, Khammam District.

== See also ==
- Sriram Sagar Project
- Sripada Yellampalli project
- Nizam Sagar
- Kaddam Project
- Pranahita Chevella
- Alisagar lift irrigation scheme
- Sri Komaram Bheem Project
- Icchampally Project
- Lower Manair Dam
- Mid Manair Dam
- Upper Manair Dam
