= Taliperu River =

River in India

Coordinates: 18°02′12″N 80°49′22″E

Taliperu is a river in the Godavari system originating in the Bijapur District of Chhattisgarh. It is a left-bank tributary of Godavari River, draining into it through a confluence located near Cherla in the Khammam District in Telangana.

The river has been harnessed for agricultural purposes through extensive canal systems developed in that region. A dam known as the Taliperu Project has been built on the river for this purpose. The water impounded by it is known as the Taliperu Reservoir, which is a medium irrigation project located at Cherla Village and Mandal, Khammam District, Telangana. This project utilizes about 5.0 TMC of water and creates 24500 Acres of Ayacut in both Cherla and Dummugudem Mandals, Khammam District.
