= Sindphana Dam =

Sindphana Dam (Hingewadi)
- Location within Maharashtra
- Official name: Sindphana Dam D01206 (Hingewadi Dharan)
- Location: Shirur Kasar, Beed
- Coordinates: 18.9933914°N 75.3895998°E
- Construction began: 1950
- Opening date: 1963
- Owners: Government of Maharashtra, India

Dam and spillways
- Type of dam: Earthfill
- Impounds: Sindphana River
- Height: 19.05 m (62.5 ft)
- Length: 1,937 m (6,355 ft)
- Dam volume: 12,593 km^{3} (3,021 cu mi)

Reservoir
- Total capacity: 10,810 km^{3} (2,590 cu mi)
- Surface area: 5,068 km^{2} (1,957 sq mi)

Sindphana Dam is an earthfill dam on Sindphana River near Shirur Kasar, Beed district in the state of Maharashtra in India.

== Specifications ==
The height of the dam above lowest foundation is 19.05 m (62.5 ft) while the length is 1,937 m (6,355 ft). The volume content is 12,593 km^{3} (3,021 cu mi) and gross storage capacity is 12,600.00 km^{3} (3,022.90 cu mi).

== Purpose ==
- Irrigation
- Farming
- Tourism

== See also ==
- Dams in Maharashtra
- List of reservoirs and dams in India
