= Mandhal =

Coordinates: 20°57′N 79°28′E

Mandhal is a major commercial town in Kuhi Taluka of Nagpur district. Mandhal is famous for Chilly production and is a major market attracting traders from across the state and the state of Madhya Pradesh, Telangana and Chhattisgarh. The Agricultural produce market committee (APMC) of Mandhal is one of the largest in the district (https://web.archive.org/web/20090410004745/http://agmarknet.nic.in/profile/profile_online/displayformdetails.asp?mkt=2116 ) that serves to 186 towns and villages in the Kuhi Taluka.

The historical name for Mandhal was Matangnagari. It is famous for Akhada i.e. Indian wrestling. Competitions are held each year for the pandav panchami of Diwali festival at Bhola hudki.

== Nearby towns ==
Mandhal has direct connectivity with all nearby towns and cities. There is frequent bus service by Maharashtra State Road Transport Corporation (MSRTC) from the district headquarter Nagpur(55 km). It is connected with sub divisional headquarter Umred and taluka place Kuhi by all weather pucca road .

=== Route map for Mandhal ===
Click on to see road route and distance from Nagpur.

=== Weather of Mandhal ===
Click on to see complete weather forecast for Mandhal.
