= Hingna =

- town
- Location in Maharashtra, India
- Coordinates: 21°4′26″N 78°57′38″E
- Country: India
- State: Maharashtra
- District: Nagpur District
- Pincode: 441110

Languages
  - Official: Marathi
- Time zone: UTC+5:30 (IST)
- Vehicle registration: MH-40, MH-49
- Nearest city: Nagpur
- Lok Sabha constituency: Ramtek (Lok Sabha constituency)

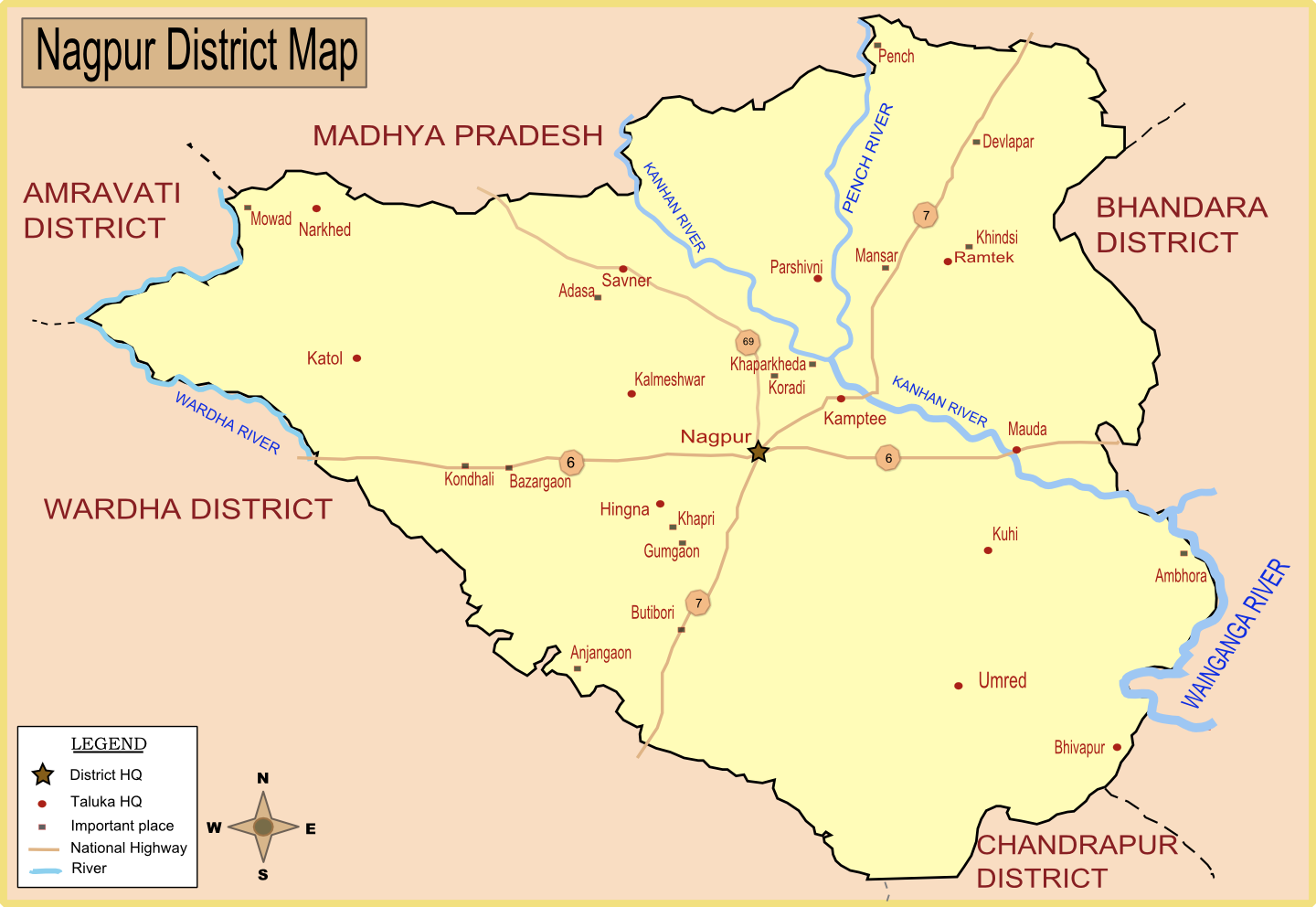
Map of Nagpur district with major towns(including Hingna) and rivers.

Hingna is a town, tehsil and taluka in Nagpur district in Maharashtra state. Now Hingna is part of Nagpur Metropolitan Region and emerging as an industrial suburb of Nagpur city due to presence of various industrial developments. The Nagpur revenue division is part of Berar region in the state.

== Town ==
Hingna is an industrial suburb of Nagpur city with industries operating from Maharashtra Industrial Development Corporation areas.

Hingna is located 15.06 km (9 mi) distance from its District Main City Nagpur. It is located 672 km (418 mi) distance from its State Main City Mumbai. The main river of the town is the Vena nadi (river).

== Taluka ==
Hingna is main town for the Hingna Taluka.

Other villages in Hingna Taluka are Adegaon, Amgaon(D), Chicholi(P), Dabha, Maharashtra, Degma (Bu), Degma (Kh), Dewli (A), Dewli (Kal), Dewli (P), Dhanoli (G), Dhanoli (K), Takalghat, Turakmari.

Year	Male	Female	Total Population	Change	Religion (%)							
Year	Male	Female	Total Population	Change	Hindu	Muslim	Christian	Sikhs	Buddhist	Jain	Other religions and persuasions	Religion not stated
2001	99263	85852	185115	-	84.690	2.195	0.298	0.219	12.418	0.072	0.065	0.043
2011	128693	113505	242198	30.837	83.815	2.696	0.225	0.124	12.862	0.080	0.021	0.178
