= Kakatiya Canal =

Coordinates: 18°57′53″N 78°21′02″E

Specifications
- Length: 284 km (176 miles)

Geography
- Start point: Sriram Sagar Reservoir
- End point: Lower Manair Dam

Kakatiya Canal is a major canal in the Telangana State in India. Its full name is SRSP Kakatiya Canal as the canal originates from the Sriram Sagar dam.

It feeds North Telangana by passing through the region for irrigation and as well as drinking water for major cities.

Kakatiya Canal is about 284 km long with 9,700 cusecs flow capacity and passing through Nizamabad, Karimnagar, Warangal and Khammam Districts. This canal is an inter river basin transfer link by feeding Godavari River water to Krishna River basin in Warangal and Khammam districts. 4 Units of 9 MW each to generate 36 MW have also been set up to harness the water head before feeding water into the canal.

== See also ==
- Sriram Sagar Project
- SRSP Flood Flow Canal
- Pranahita Chevella
