= Nagpur Metropolitan Region Development Authority =

Indian government agency

Agency overview
- Preceding agency: Nagpur Improvement Trust
- Type: Urban Planning Agency
- Jurisdiction: Nagpur metropolitan area
- Headquarters: Sadar, Nagpur, Maharashtra
- Minister responsible: Devendra Fadnavis, Chief Minister/Chairman/Minister of Urban Development
- Agency executive: Shri. Sanjay Meena, Metropolitan Commissioner
- Parent agency: Municipal Administration and Ministry of Urban Development
- Website: NMRDA Official Website

The Nagpur Metropolitan Region Development Authority (NMRDA) is the urban planning agency of Nagpur in the Indian state of Maharashtra. The NMRDA administers the Nagpur Metropolitan Region, spread over an area of 3,567.37 km^{2} (1,377.37 sq mi). It replaced the erstwhile Nagpur Improvement Trust. It was set up to plan, coordinate, supervise, promote, and secure the planned development of the Nagpur Metropolitan Region. It coordinates the development activities of municipal corporations, municipalities, and other local authorities.

== See also ==
- Mumbai Metropolitan Region Development Authority
- Pune Metropolitan Region Development Authority
- Nashik Metropolitan Region Development Authority
