= Sindphana River =

Sindphana
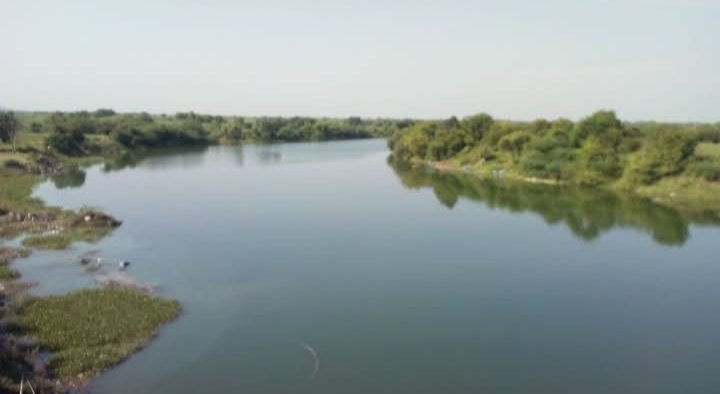
- Sindphana river

Location
- Country: India
- State: Maharashtra
- Region: Marathwada
- District: Beed
- City: Majalgaon

Physical characteristics
- Source: Chincholi hill
  - location: Patoda Taluka, Beed district, Marathwada, Maharashtra, India
  - coordinates: 19°23′N 76°26′E
  - elevation: 528 m (1,732 ft)
- Mouth: Godavari River
  - location: Manjarath, Beed District, Marathwada, Maharashtra
  - coordinates: 19°49′N 76°54′E
  - elevation: 407 m (1,335 ft)
- Length: 122 km (76 mi)

Basin features
- Tributaries
  - left: Kinha River
  - right: Bindusara River, Kundalika river

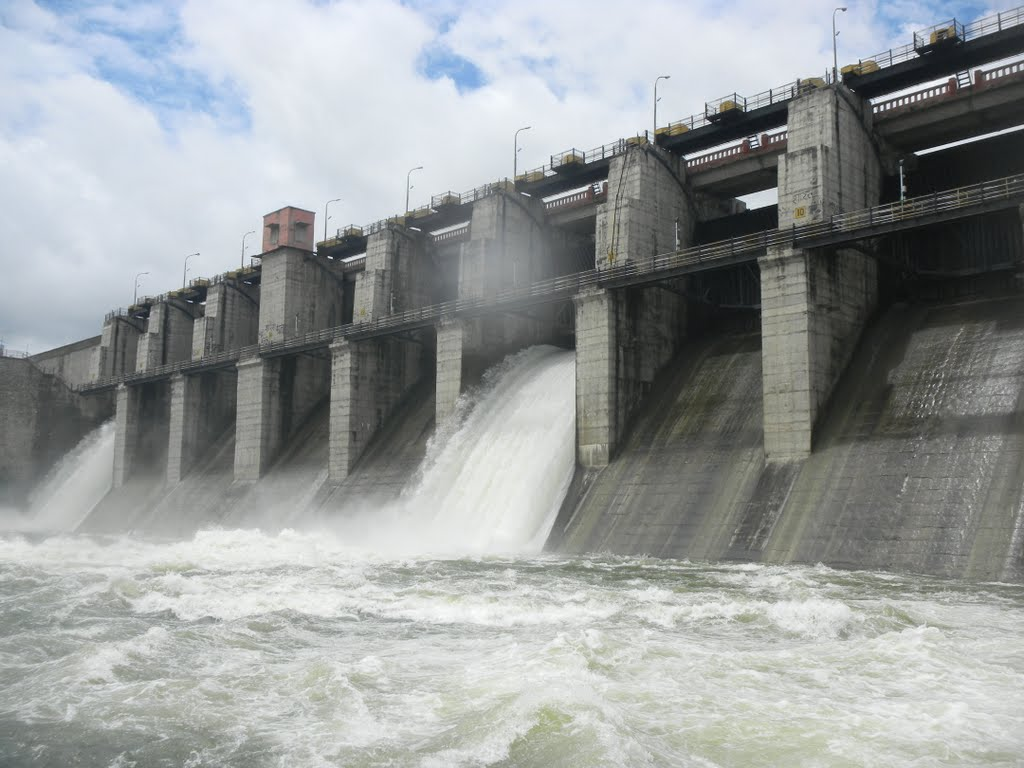
Majalgaon Dam on Sindphana River

Sindphana is a minor tributary of Godavari river that originates around the Chincholi hill in Patoda Taluka, Beed District, Maharashtra, in India. Crossing west to east its drainage basin covers nearly 80% of Beed District, making it the most important river within the district. The Majalgaon Dam, constructed across the river, irrigates 93885 hectares of land in Beed, Parbhani & Nanded districts.

== Origin ==
The Sindphana rises in the Chinchol hill at the north-west apex of the Balagat plateau in the Patoda Taluka of [Beed District].

== Course ==
From the site of origin the river flows in a northeasterly course past Amalner, a small village in the Patoda taluka. About a kilometre below Chavarwadi it makes a right-angle turn to follow a north-westerly direction flowing to Sindphana village, where the Sindphana Dam sits across the river. Here, it resumes its north-easterly course once again. After the confluence of another tributary, the Kinha, the Sindphana has a fairly long easterly course flowing alongside the villages Yelamb, Pimpari and Hirapur, beyond which it is joined by one of its tributaries - the Bindusara River. Its flow is interrupted by the Majalgaon Dam at Majalgaon, after which it flows north-eastwards and then northwards to join the Godavari at Manjarath village, Pathri taluka, Parbhani District at an elevation of 407m.

== Tributaries ==
=== Left bank ===
The only important tributaries of the Sindphana on its left bank are the Ad, the Belpar and the Kinha in the western part. In the eastern part the tributaries on the left flank flowing from the north are very small sized streams.

- The Ad rising on the northern slopes of the Chincholi hills flows by Kotan in a north-easterly direction to fall into the backwaters of the reservoir created by the Sindphana Dam.
- The Belpar also rises on the northern slopes of the Chincholi hills to the west of the Ad. After flowing past Hatola, it makes a short diversion out of the Ahmednagar district and after re-entering the district, flows by Pimpalner to join the Sindphana at Gomalwada.The Belapara Project Lake is situated on this river.
- The Kinha river (alternatively known as the Sina) rising in the hills to the west of Pangri village, flows in an easterly or north-easterly course, sometimes within and sometimes outside the district and joins the Sindphana just above Nimbgaon. The Kinha has several small tributaries such as the Manikarni. flowing by Manur, and the Nandidara, flowing by Ukirda.

=== Right bank ===
There are innumerable right-flank tributaries of Sindphana flowing from the Balaghat slopes, the more important of which, in order from west to east are the Uthola flowing by Raimoha, the Utawali flowing by Khokarmoha and Khalapuri, the Dombri flowing by Dombri, Ukhanda and Rajuri and joining the Sindphana opposite to Shiras marga, the Bindusara, the Takur rising on the eastern slopes of Pimpalgaon Ghat, the Pimpalner river and the Kundalika. Of these the Bendsura and the Kundalika are of considerable size and length and require some detailed consideration.

- Bindusara: The Bindusara rises near Waghera, 2 kilometres north-west of Limba Ganesh and has a fairly long course on the northern slopes of the Balaghat plateau first flowing northwards and after Kadamwadi eastwards to Pali village, receiving a number of tributaries on both banks comprising a fairly large catchment area of 183 square kilometres. This has been taken advantage of by the Bindusara project. About 8 kilometres below Pali the river flows through Beed town with a north-north-east course to join the Sindphana. The headward erosion of this comparatively large sized stream has been so considerable that the watershed to the south has migrated further south here than at other places.
- The Kundalika, called very often by the shortened form Kundka, rises to the north-east of Neknur and flows first in a north-easterly direction and then in an easterly direction up to Nagjheri after which it has a general northerly course to join the Sindphana a few kilometres upstream of Manjlegaon.

== Dams ==
- Majalgaon Dam
- Sindphana Dam
