= Sirpur Dam =

- Location within Maharashtra
- Official name: Sirpur Dam
- Location: Deori
- Coordinates: 21.0315736°N 80.4501343°E
- Opening date: 1970
- Owners: Government of Maharashtra, India

Dam and spillways
- Type of dam: Earthfill; Gravity
- Impounds: Bagh river
- Height: 24.69 m (81.0 ft)
- Length: 2,840 m (9,320 ft)
- Dam volume: 1,195,000 m^{3} (42,200,000 cu ft)

Reservoir
- Creates: Bagh reservoir
- Total capacity: 0.20384 km^{3} (0.04890 cu mi)
- Surface area: 32.970 km^{2} (12.730 sq mi)

Sirpur Dam, is an earth fill and gravity dam on Bagh river near Deori, Gondia district in the state of Maharashtra in India. The reservoir created by the dam is also known as Bagh reservoir. It is a joint project of Maharashtra and Chhattisgarh states located in Godavari River basin.

== Specifications ==
The height of the dam above the lowest foundation is 24.69 m (81.0 ft) while the length is 2,840 m (9,320 ft). The gross storage capacity is 0.20384 km^{3} (0.04890 cu mi).

== Purpose ==
- Irrigation

== See also ==
- Dams in Maharashtra
- List of reservoirs and dams in India
