= Majalgaon Dam =

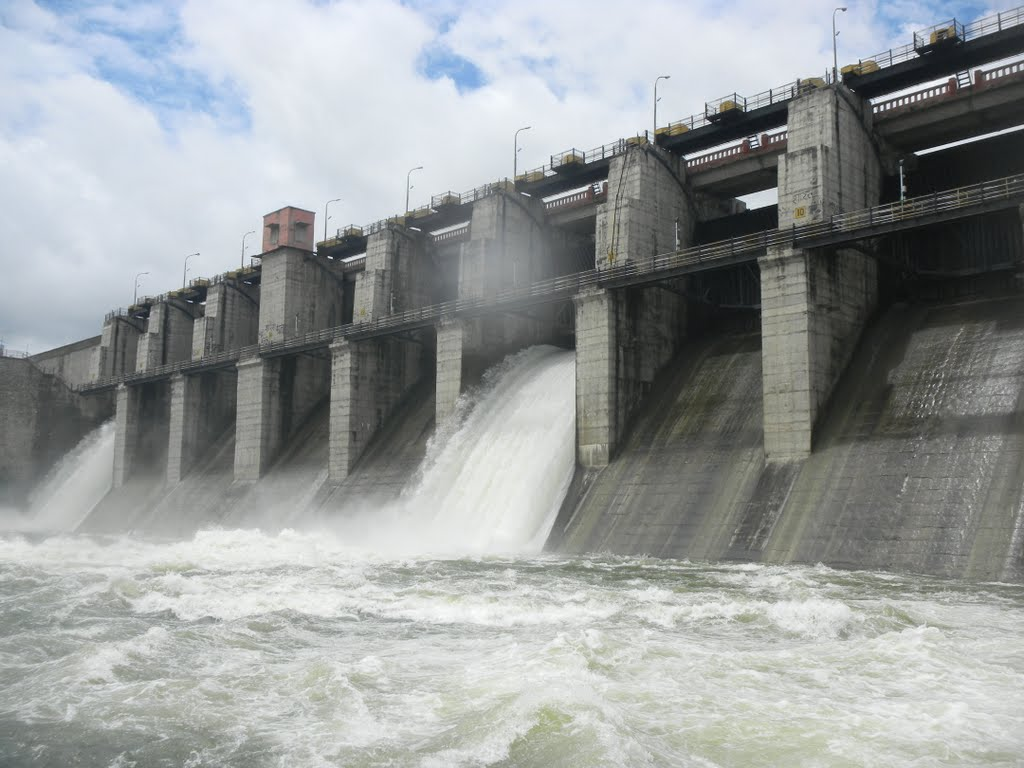

- Location within Maharashtra
- Official name: Jayakwadi Stage-II Dam
- Location: Majalgaon
- Coordinates: 19.150458°N 76.1816186°E
- Opening date: 1987
- Construction cost: Rs 54,300 Lakhs
- Owners: Government of Maharashtra, India

Dam and spillways
- Type of dam: Earthfill
- Impounds: Sindphana River
- Height: 31.19 m (102.3 ft)
- Length: 6,488 m (21,286 ft)
- Dam volume: 5.759 million cubic meters
- Spillway type: Gated Ogee
- Spillway capacity: 14,500 Cumecs

Reservoir
- Creates: Majalgaon
- Total capacity: 0.311300 km^{3} (0.074685 cu mi)
- Catchment area: 3,840 sq.km
- Surface area: 78.130 km^{2} (30.166 sq mi)

Power Station
- Turbines: 3
- Installed capacity: 750 KW each 2250 KW total (max)

Majalgaon Dam is a major earthfill dam, constructed across the Sindphana River, near Majalgaon in Beed district, Maharashtra, India. It forms part of the Jaikwadi Project Stage II and plays a vital role in irrigation, water supply, and power generation. Completed in 1987, the dam has a height of 31 metres and a length of 6.5 kilometres, creating a reservoir with a gross storage capacity of 453.64 million cubic metres. The Majalgaon Right Bank Canal, 165 kilometres long, irrigates 93,885 hectares across Beed, Parbhani, and Nanded. In addition, the dam supports hydroelectric generation, contributing to regional development.

== History ==
Majalgaon Dam and the Majalgaon Right Bank Canal form key components of the Jaikwadi Project (Stage II). The dam has been constructed across the Sindhaphana River, a major tributary of the Godavari, also known as Dakshin Ganga. The project was approved by the Government of Maharashtra in 1976 at an estimated cost of Rs. 5,433 lakhs.

The Majalgaon Dam is designed with earth berms on either side of a gated concrete spillway, located about 2 kilometres upstream of Majalgaon town. The dam will house three hydroelectric generators, each with a capacity of 750 kilowatts. Complementing this, a 165-kilometre-long canal has been constructed to irrigate 93,885 hectares (ICA) of agricultural land across Beed, Parbhani, and Nanded districts.

== Land Acquisition and Rehabilitation ==
The construction of the dam affected 34 villages, of which 18 were fully submerged and 2 were partially inundated. In total, 7,813 hectares of land came under water, though no forest land was affected. The displaced villages were rehabilitated and resettled into 26 newly developed residential settlements.

The dam stands 31.19 metres (102.3 ft) high from its foundation and stretches 6,488 metres (21,286 ft) in length. Its structural volume is 5.759 million cubic metres, while the gross water storage capacity created by the reservoir is 0.453640 cubic kilometres (0.108834 cubic miles).

== Purpose ==
- Irrigation
- Hydroelectricity
- Water supply to Beed city
- Drinking water and Industrial use

== See also ==
- Dams in Maharashtra
- List of reservoirs and dams in India
