= Yerkheda =

- Census town
- Location in Maharashtra, India
- Coordinates: 21.2142°N 79.1801°E
- Country: India
- State: Maharashtra
- District: Nagpur

Area
  - Total: 5.10 km^{2} (1.97 sq mi)

Population (2011)
  - Total: 15,727
  - Density: 3,080/km^{2} (7,990/sq mi)

Languages
  - Official: Marathi
- Time zone: UTC+5:30 (IST)

Yerkheda is a census town in Nagpur district in the Indian state of Maharashtra.

== Demographics ==
As of the 2011 Census of India, Yerkheda had a population of 15,727, of which 8,002 were males and 7,725 were females. The literacy rate was 92.40%.
