= Manar Dam =

- Location within Maharashtra
- Official name: Manar Dam D01052
- Location: Warwant, Tq. Kandhar, Dist. Nanded
- Coordinates: 18.8381384°N 77.31662°E
- Opening date: 1968
- Owners: Government of Maharashtra, India

Dam and spillways
- Type of dam: Earthfill
- Impounds: Manar River
- Height: 27 m (89 ft)
- Length: 2,592 m (8,504 ft)
- Dam volume: 1,557 km^{3} (374 cu mi)

Reservoir
- Total capacity: 128,700 km^{3} (30,900 cu mi)
- Surface area: 2,559 km^{2} (988 sq mi)

Manar Dam, is an earthfill dam on the Manar River at village Warwant near Barul Tal.Kandhar, Nanded district in the state of Maharashtra in India.

Manar Project is situated at village Barul which is, 51.92 km (32.26 mi) distant from the district headquarters. An approach road of 25.76 km (16.01 mi) in length has been constructed from Soankhed on Nanded-Latur road connecting the dam site.

The earthen dam has been put across the Manar. The maximum height of the dam is 26.84 metres (88.1 feet) and the length is 1,859.28 metres (6,100.0 feet).

The left bank canal is 72.420 km (45.000 mi) in length with a carrying capacity of 590 cusecs. The right bank canal, with a carrying capacity of 42 cusecs is, 19.312 km (12.000 mi) in length. The waste weir on the right bank has a total length of 731.52 metres (2,400.0 feet). The project will facilitate irrigation of 26,708.88 hectares (65,999.1 acres) of land. The construction work was started in 1960 and was scheduled to be completed in two phases by the end of the Third Five-Year Plan at an estimated cost of Rs. 5,26,69,400.

== Specifications ==
The height of the dam above lowest foundation is 27 m (89 ft) while the length is 2,592 m (8,504 ft). The volume content is 1,557 km^{3} (374 cu mi) and gross storage capacity is 139,000.00 km^{3} (33,347.87 cu mi).

== Purpose ==
- Irrigation
- Small scale fishing

== See also ==
- Dams in Maharashtra
- List of reservoirs and dams in India
