= Jayakwadi Dam =

Dam in Maharashtra, India

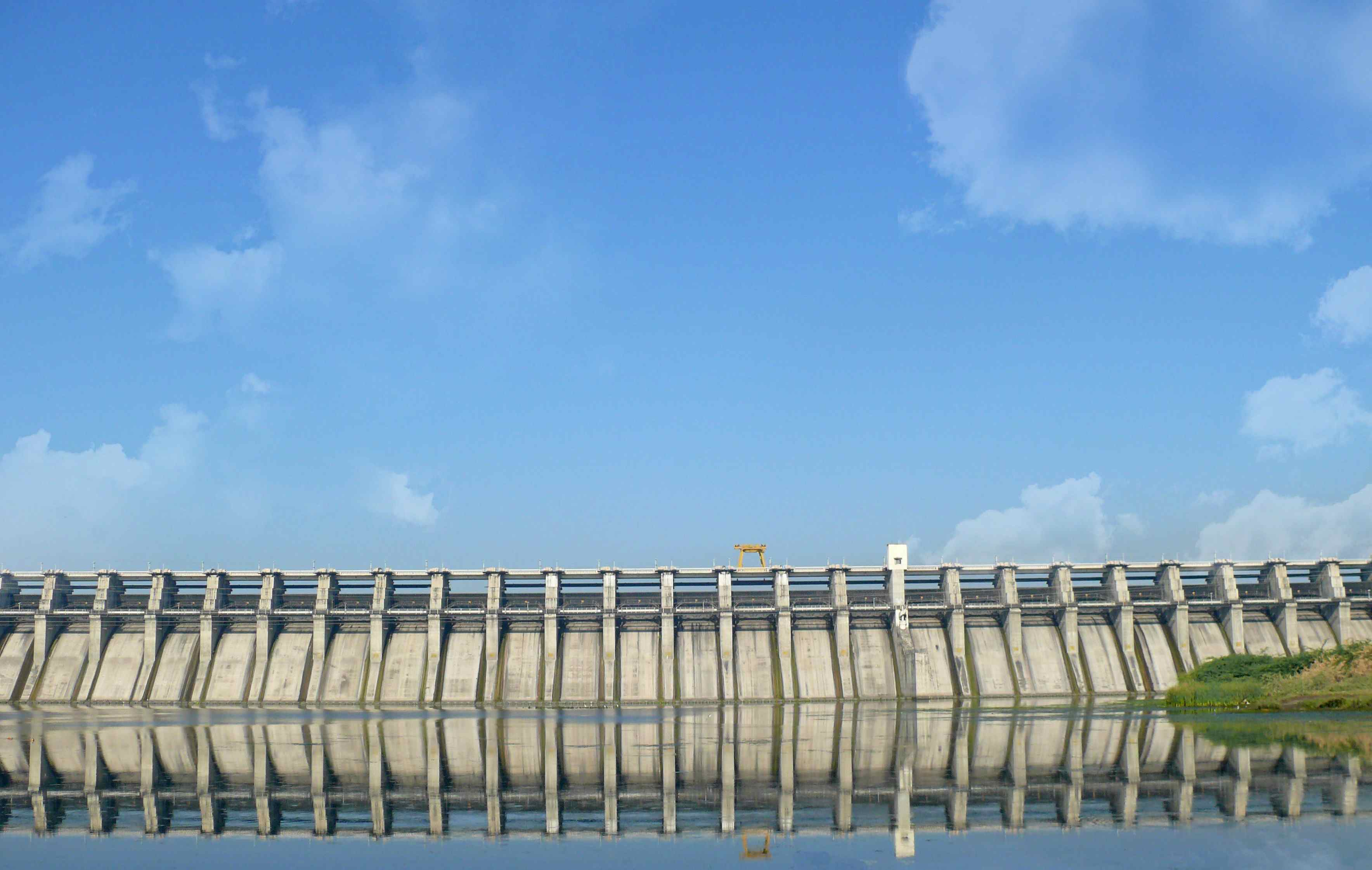
- Jayakwadi dam with its floodgates closed

- Location within India
- Official name: Jayakwadi-I D02995
- Location: Jayakwadi, Aurangabad district, Maharashtra, India
- Coordinates: 19°29′8.7″N 75°22′12″E
- Construction began: 1965
- Opening date: 1976
- Construction cost: 4,700 cr
- Owner: Government of Maharashtra

Dam and spillways
- Type of dam: Earthen dam
- Impounds: Godavari River
- Height: 41.30 m (135 ft)
- Length: 9,998 m (32,802 ft) (9.998 km)
- Spillways: 27 Gates
- Spillway capacity: 18153 cubic meters/sec

Reservoir
- Creates: Nath Sagar Jalashay
- Total capacity: 2.909 km^{3} (1.027×10^{11} ft^{3}) (102.75 tmc ft)
- Active capacity: 2.17 cubic kms (77 tmc ft)
- Inactive capacity: 26 tmc ft
- Catchment area: 21,750 km^{2} (8,398 mi^{2})
- Surface area: 350 km^{2} (135 mi^{2})

Power Station
- Installed capacity: 12 MW

Jayakwadi Dam is an earthen dam located on Godavari river at the site of Jayakwadi village in Paithan, India. It is a multipurpose project. The water is mainly used to irrigate agricultural land in the drought-prone Marathwada region of the state. It also provides water for drinking and industrial usage to nearby towns and villages and to the municipalities and industrial areas of Sambhajinagar and Jalna districts. The surrounding area of the dam has a garden and a bird sanctuary.

== History and significance ==
A plan to build a dam on Godavari river in the drought-prone Marathwada region was first conceived during rule of state of Hyderabad. The plan was to build a dam in Beed district near Jayakwadi village with storage capacity of 2,147 MCM (million cubic meters). The project came to be known as Jayakwadi project after the name of the village. However, after formation of new state of Maharashtra and comparative analysis on alternative places, it was decided to build a dam 100 km upstream at Paithan. The project was continued to name as Jayakwadi even after it was shifted to a new location. Building dam at higher level made it possible to have longer canals and thus providing irrigation facility to a larger region. The project proposal for this was completed by 1964, under the supervision of Mr. A A A Siddiqui, the incharge Civil Engineer, member of public commission, Maharashtra.

The foundation of the dam was laid by Lal Bahadur Shastri, then Prime Minister of India, on 18 October 1965. The dam was inaugurated on 24 February 1976 by the then Prime Minister Indira Gandhi.

== Dam ==
Jayakwadi is one of the longest earthen dams in Asia. Its height is about 41.30 metres (135.5 ft) and length of about 10 kilometres (6.2 mi) with a total storage capacity of 2,909 million cubic meters. The total catchment area of dam is 21,750 km^{2} (8,400 sq mi). There are 27 water gates for the dam. Jayakwadi Dam is also called as Nathsagar Dam.

"Over its lifetime, it has overflowed 19 times. On 10 August 2006, the highest discharge of 250,000 ft³/s was recorded. However, this record was broken on 28 September 2025, when the Jayakwadi Dam released its highest-ever water discharge of 3,08,824 cusecs into the Godavari River — an amount of water never released from the dam since its construction."

== Nath Sagar Jalashay ==
Nath Sagar Jalashay is the name of the reservoir formed by Jayakwadi Dam. Fed by the Godavari and Pravara rivers the reservoir is about 55 km long and 27 km wide and spans over 350 km^{2} (140 sq mi). Total submergence area due to the reservoir is about 36,000 hectares (89,000 acres).

Siltation has taken a heavy toll on the project. It is estimated that approximately 30% of the dam is filled with silt, reducing its life as well as storage capacity. Survey findings show that from 2003 to 2012, there was a loss of 31% (that is 8.08 thousand million cubic (TMC) feet) in dead storage and 14% (that is 10.73 TMC) in live storage capacity of the dam due to silt.

== Purpose ==
Jayakwadi project is a multipurpose project. The main purpose was to irrigate land for agriculture in the drought prone Marathwada region of Maharashtra state. Other important purpose was to provide water for drinking and industrial usage to nearby towns and villages and to the municipalities and industrial areas of Chhatrapati Sambhajinagar and Jalna. 80% of water of dam is allocated for irrigation, 5-7% for drinking water and the rest for industrial purposes. The average daily discharge of the dam is around 1.36 MCM, of which 0.05 MCM of water is supplied to the MIDC area, 0.15 MCM is distributed to fulfill the needs of Sambhajinagar, while the remaining amount is lost in evaporation.

=== Irrigation ===
The Jayakwadi project is one of the largest irrigation projects in Maharashtra of India . Through its canal system, the dam irrigates cultivable area of 237,452 hectares in the districts of Chhatrapati Sambhajinagar, Jalna, Beed, Ahmednagar and Parbhani. The length of left bank canal is 208 km, the length of right bank canal is 132 km, commanding a total area is 183,858 hectares. The gross irrigated area by 96,000 hectares under right bank canal was further enlarged by constructing Majalgaon Dam which acts as a balancing reservoir in addition to harness the Sindphana tributary of the Godavari river.

=== Electricity generation ===
A hydroelectric power plant of 12 MW capacity is installed on the right bank of the river. The water used for power generation is pumped back to the main reservoir from the tail pond using reversible hydro turbine.

During the drought year 2015, the inflows into the reservoir were very meagre due to failure of rains in the catchment area. However nearly 18 tmcft dead storage water available in the reservoir could not be used for the dire needs. With minor external modifications to the exiting reversible hydro turbine unit, most of the dead storage water can be put to use during the drought years by using the hydro power plant for pumping water into the nearby right canal. Water would be released downstream into the tail pond over the spillway (if needed by siphon pipes). Nearly five km long contour canal at MDDL of the right canal in the reservoir area is constructed to connect the power house area with the right canal intake point. The pen stock of the hydro power unit is extended (less than 100 m long) to connect to the contour canal. The hydro power unit is operated in pumping mode to pump water from the tail pond to the right canal when the reservoir level is below the canal's minimum draw down level (MDDL). The pen stock extension piping is detached when water pumping to the canal is not required to restore its normal power generation when the reservoir level is above the right canal's MDDL When the reservoir level is above the right canal MDDL level, the contour canal located in the reservoir area gets submerged without suffering any damage as it is not obstructing the flood flow to the dam spillway.

=== Industrial use ===
Around 0.05 MCM water is supplied daily from dam to various industries located in Chhatrpati Sambhajinagar and Jalna MIDC areas. The dam is also a primary source of water to the Parli Thermal Power Station.

== Flora and fauna ==
Aquatic vegetation has species of Chara, Spirogyra, Hydrilla, Potamogeton and Vallisneria. Surrounding areas grow Argemone mexicana and Ipomoea carnea. Around 37 species of flora have been reported in the vicinity of reservoir. Seasonal farming (gal pera) is carried out on the exposed land when the waterline recedes.

== Dnyaneshwar Udyan ==
Dnyaneshwar Udyan is one of the largest gardens in Maharashtra resembling the Brindavan Gardens of Mysore. It is spread over 125 hectares and is situated on the banks of Nathsagar Lake formed due to Jayakwadi Dam. It is located near the town of Paithan which is 50 km south of Aurangabad.

== Jayakwadi Bird Sanctuary ==
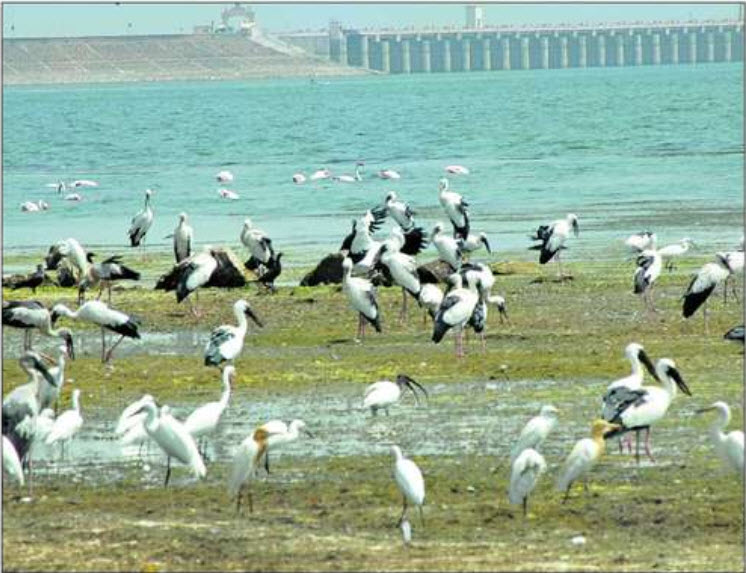
Migratory birds at Jayakwadi

The Nath Sagar reservoir creates 30 island of various sizes in the shallow waters, with trees for roosting, this provides an ideal shelter for migratory birds. Close to the dam a bird sanctuary has been created which is home for many species of resident and migrant birds. Almost 200 species of birds can be found in this region, which includes more than 70 species of migratory birds. Out of these, 45 chief species are of international migration. Notable amongst migratory birds are cranes, flamingos, pintails, wigeons, shovellers, brahminy ducks, pochards, teals, godwits, and glossy ibises.

Many species are reported in numbers larger than 1% of their bio-geographic population thresholds in Jayakwadi bird sanctuary (Wetlands International Norms – 2002). The Jayakwadi bird sanctuary qualifies for the congregatory criteria A4-i, A4-iii and A4-iv. [ A4i (≥1% biogeographic population), A4iii (≥20,000 water birds), A4iv (known to exceed thresholds set for migratory species) ].

However, the dam's high water levels have resulted in a loss of habitats for the birds, with an environmentalist noting in 2019 that "it could happen that migratory birds from our country and abroad may prefer other water bodies than the bird sanctuary".

== Renewable energy project and community opposition ==
In 2021, NTPC Limited announced a proposal for a 1,200 MW floating solar power project at the Jayakwadi Dam, backed by Bhagwat Karad (former Union Minister of State for Finance). The project was introduced as part of the country's plan to expand renewable energy generation, with solar panels to be installed across sections of the Nathsagar Reservoir. Following the announcement, local fishing communities expressed concern that large-scale solar installations would destroy livelihoods. Floating photovoltaic installations reduce sunlight and oxygen levels in water, alter temperature and nutrient balance, and can disrupt aquatic food webs and breeding cycles. The Bharatiya Janata Party has also petitioned to remove the bird sanctuary and Eco-Sensitive Zone status of the dam to accommodate the floating solar power project, drawing concerns from conservationists.

In early 2024, several fishing associations began organizing rallies, petitions, and meetings with local officials to oppose the project. After officials withdrew written assurances regarding the cancellation of the project, fisherfolk intensified their protest through a "Jal-Samadhi" (water-submerged hunger strike), in which thousands of fisherfolk entered the reservoir to demonstrate against the construction. Media outlets reported that at least ten protesters fainted due to exhaustion during the event, with protestors also warning mass suicides could take place if the project proceeded.

On December 11 2024, the Supreme Court of India dismissed an appeal by the Kahar Samaj Panch Committee challenging the National Green Tribunal's approval of the Jayakwadi floating solar power project, thereby allowing the project to proceed.

== See also ==
- Yeldari Dam
- Godavari River Basin Irrigation Projects
- Marathwada
