= Nagpur district =

- District of Maharashtra
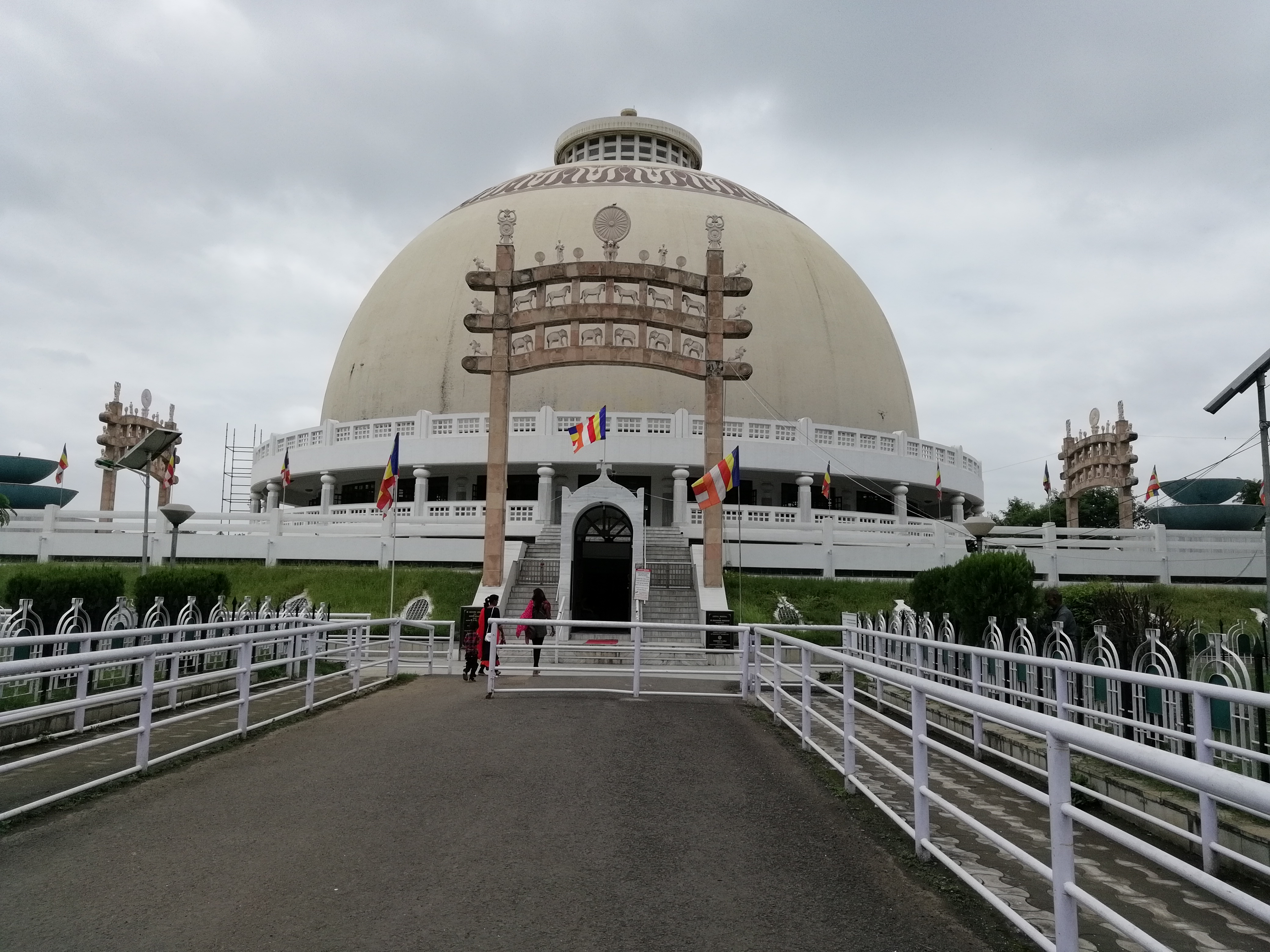
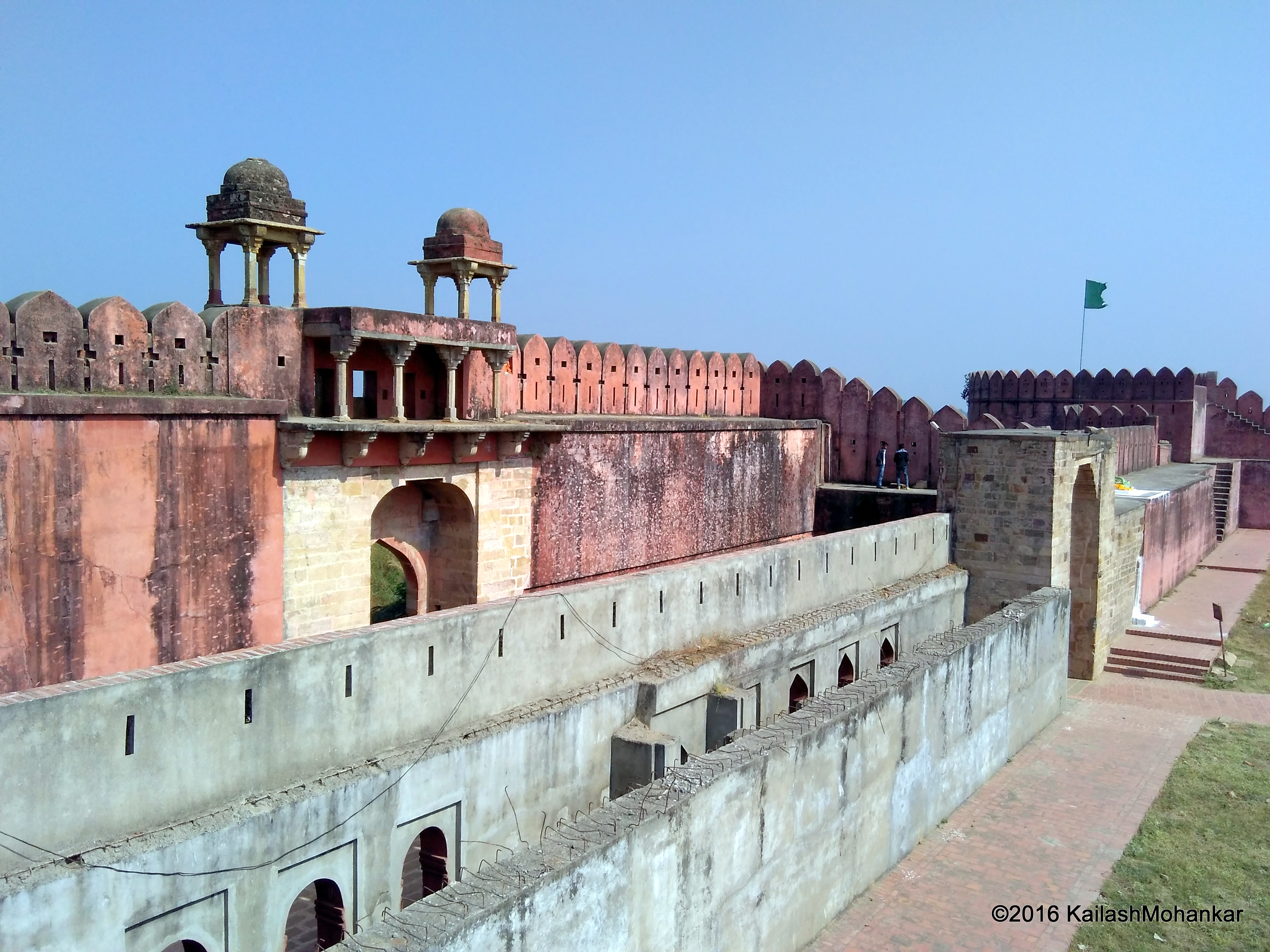
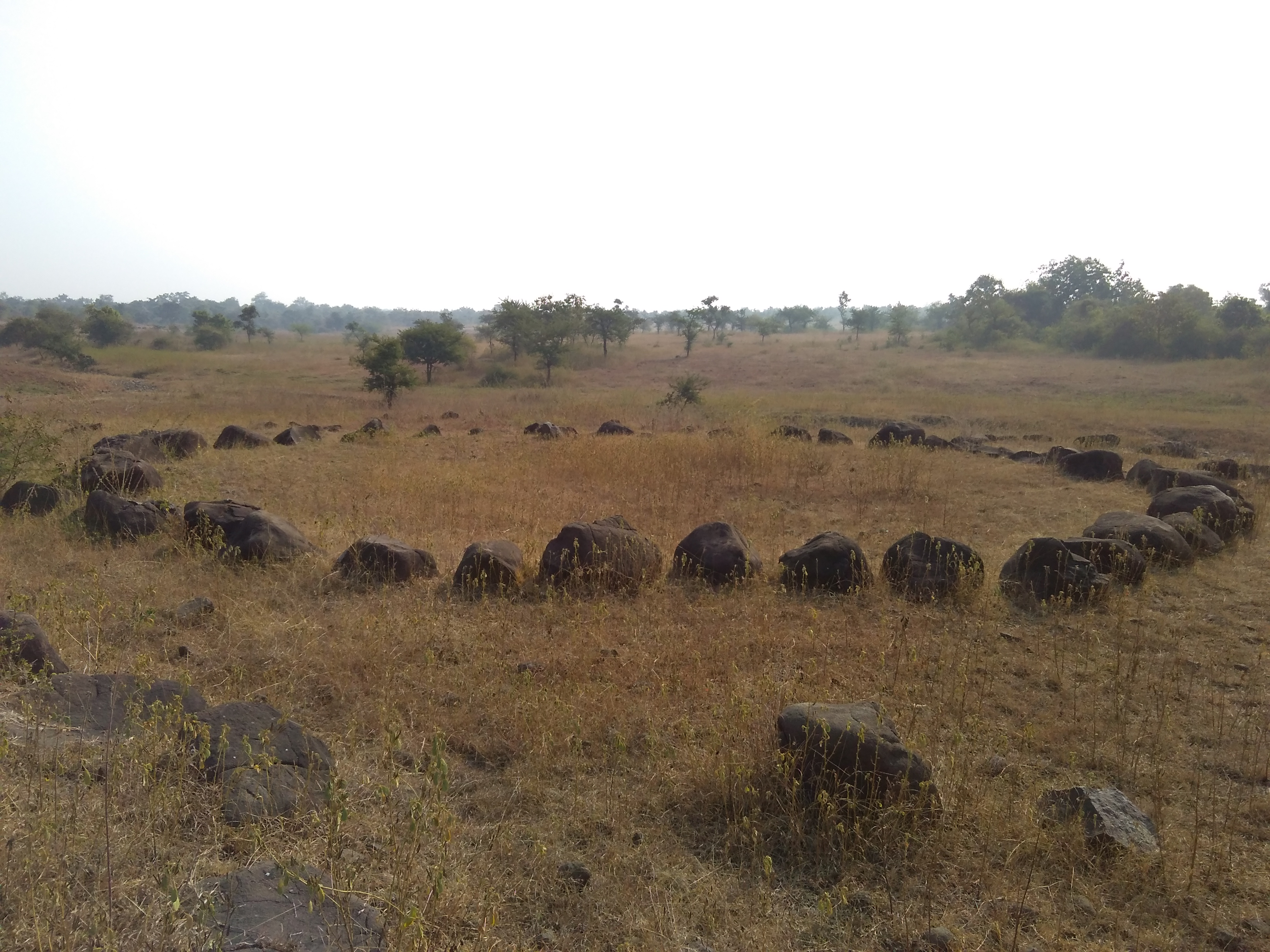
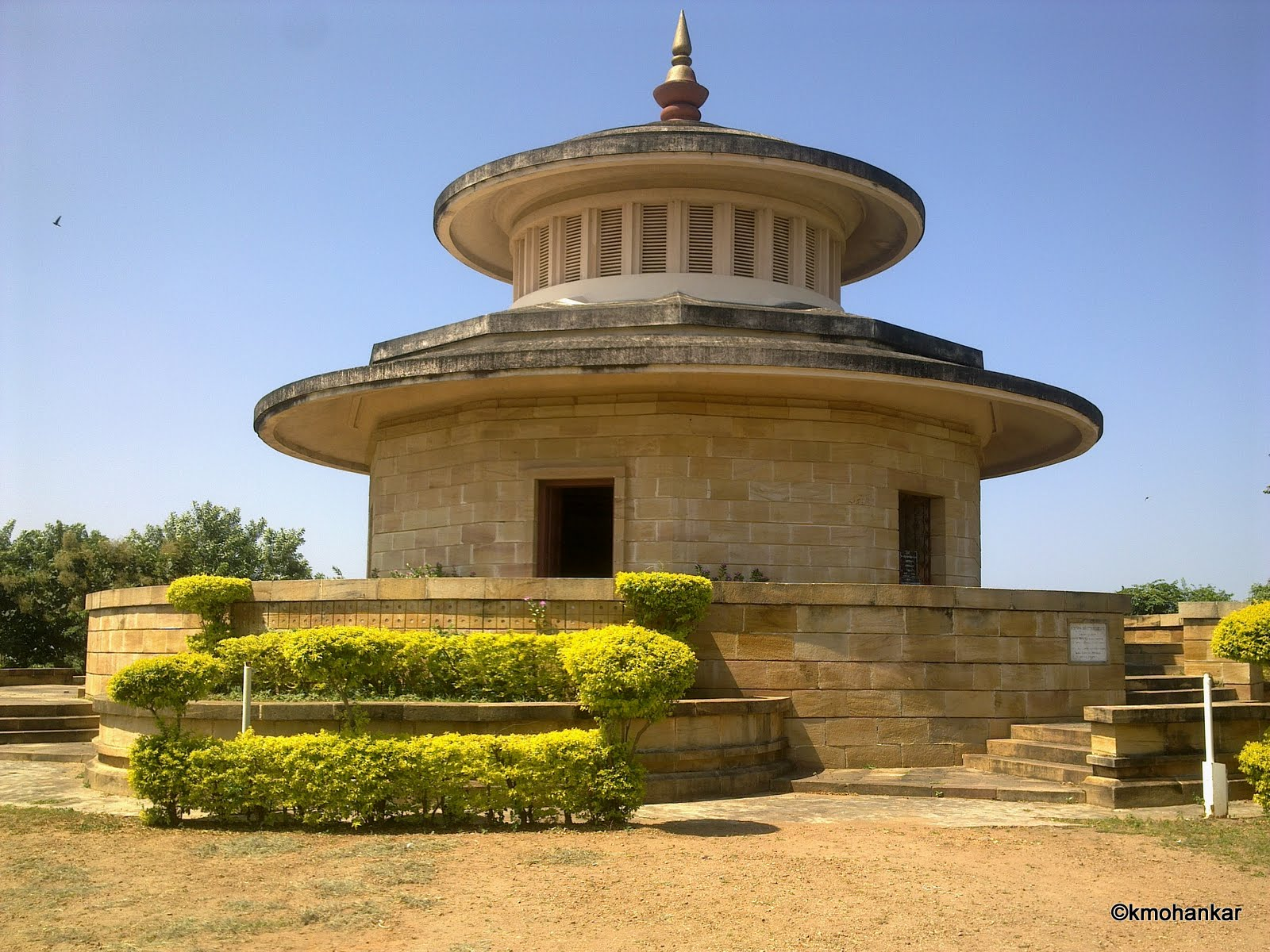
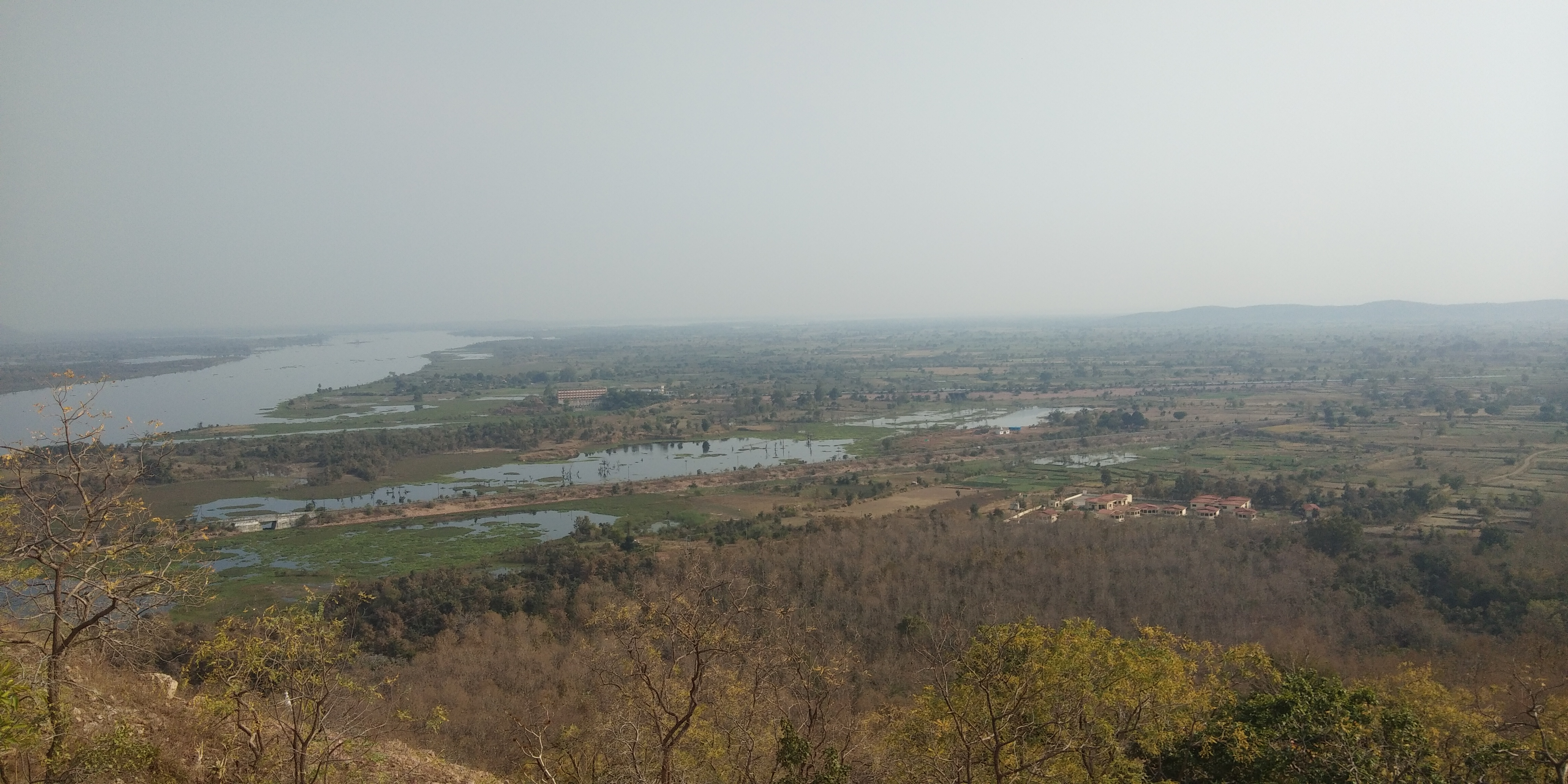
- Clockwise from top-left: Deekshabhoomi, Nagardhan Fort, Kalidas Memorial at Ramtek, Rivers at Ambhora, Stone circles of Junapani

- Location in Maharashtra
- Nagpur district
- Coordinates (Nagpur): 21°00′N 79°00′E
- Country: India
- State: Maharashtra
- Division: Nagpur
- Headquarters: Nagpur
- Tehsils: 1. Ramtek, 2. Umred, 3. Kalameshwar, 4. Katol, 5. Kamthi, 6. Kuhi, 7. Narkhed, 8. Nagpur, 9. Nagpur (Rural), 10. Parseoni, 11. Bhiwapur, 12. Mouda, 13. Savner, 14. Hingna

Government
  - Guardian Minister: Chandrashekhar Bawankule (Cabinet Minister)
  - Divisional Commissioner: Vijayalaxmi Bidari(IAS)
  - District Collector: Dr.Vipin Itankar(IAS)
  - District Council CEO: Vinayak Mahamuni(IAS)
  - MPs: Nitin Gadkari (Nagpur Lok Sabha); Shyamkumar (Bablu) Barve (Ramtek Lok Sabha)

Area
  - Total: 9,892 km^{2} (3,819 sq mi)

Population (2011)
  - Total: 4,653,570
  - Density: 470.4/km^{2} (1,218/sq mi)
  - Urban: 64.26%

Demographics
  - Literacy: 89.5%
  - Sex ratio: 948
- Time zone: UTC+05:30 (IST)
- Average annual precipitation: 1205 mm
- Nominal gross domestic product(Nagpur district): INR 1,81,665 crores (2022-2023)
- Per capita income(Nagpur district): INR 2,48,442 (2022-23)
- Website: nagpur.gov.in

Nagpur district (Marathi pronunciation: [naːɡpuːɾ]) is a district in the Vidarbha region of Maharashtra state in central India. The city of Nagpur is the district administrative centre. The district is part of Nagpur Division.

Nagpur district is bounded by Bhandara district on the east, Chandrapur district on the southeast, Wardha district on the southwest, Amravati district on the northwest and Chhindwara district and Seoni district of Madhya Pradesh state on the north.

== History ==
In 1853, after the death of Raghoji III, the princely state of Nagpur was annexed by the British and the territory occupied by the present district became part of the then Nagpur Province. In 1861, it was merged with the Central Provinces. In 1903 it became part of the Central Provinces and Berar. In 1950 Nagpur district was created when it became part of the newly formed Madhya Pradesh state and Nagpur became its capital. In 1956, after a reorganisation of Indian states, Nagpur district was incorporated into Bombay state. On 1 May 1960, it became a district of Maharashtra state.

== Geography ==
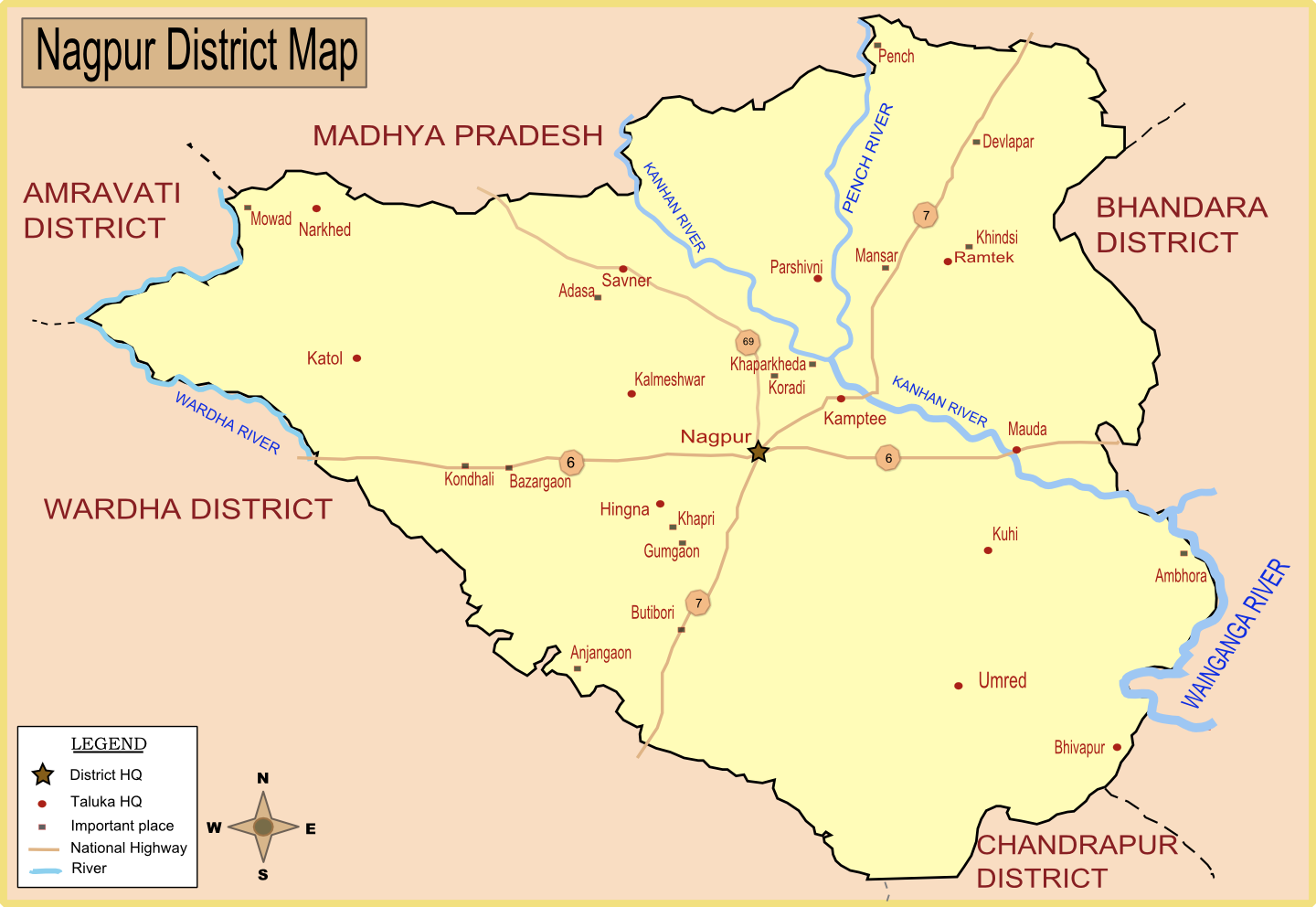
Map of Nagpur district with major towns and rivers.

=== Climate ===
Nagpur

Climate chart (precipitation, max. and min. temperature)
J	F	M	A	M	J	J	A	S	O	N	D
10 29 12	12 32 15	18 36 19	13 40 24	16 43 28	172 38 26	304 32 24	292 30 24	194 32 23	51 33 20	12 30 15	17 28 12
- █ Average max. and min. temperatures in °C
- █ Precipitation totals in mm
- Source: World Weather Information Service
Imperial conversion
J	F	M	A	M	J	J	A	S	O	N	D
0.4 83 54	0.5 90 59	0.7 97 66	0.5 104 75	0.6 109 82	6.8 100 79	12 89 75	11 87 74	7.6 89 73	2 91 68	0.5 87 59	0.7 83 54
- █ Average max. and min. temperatures in °F
- █ Precipitation totals in inches

Climate data for Nagpur
Month	Jan	Feb	Mar	Apr	May	Jun	Jul	Aug	Sep	Oct	Nov	Dec	Year
Record high °C (°F)	33 (91)	37 (99)	41 (106)	47 (117)	49 (120)	45 (113)	38 (100)	40 (104)	39 (102)	37 (99)	35 (95)	32 (90)	49 (120)
Mean daily maximum °C (°F)	28.6 (83.5)	32.1 (89.8)	36.3 (97.3)	40.2 (104.4)	42.6 (108.7)	37.8 (100.0)	31.5 (88.7)	30.4 (86.7)	31.8 (89.2)	32.6 (90.7)	30.4 (86.7)	28.2 (82.8)	33.5 (92.3)
Mean daily minimum °C (°F)	12.4 (54.3)	15.0 (59.0)	19.0 (66.2)	23.9 (75.0)	27.9 (82.2)	26.3 (79.3)	24.1 (75.4)	23.6 (74.5)	22.9 (73.2)	19.8 (67.6)	14.9 (58.8)	12.1 (53.8)	20.2 (68.4)
Record low °C (°F)	7 (45)	8 (46)	12 (54)	17 (63)	18 (64)	20 (68)	20 (68)	20 (68)	19 (66)	11 (52)	5 (41)	3.5 (38.3)	3.5 (38.3)
Average precipitation mm (inches)	10.2 (0.40)	12.3 (0.48)	17.8 (0.70)	13.2 (0.52)	16.3 (0.64)	172.2 (6.78)	304.3 (11.98)	291.6 (11.48)	194.4 (7.65)	51.4 (2.02)	11.8 (0.46)	17.2 (0.68)	1,112.7 (43.81)

== Divisions ==
Nagpur district is divided into 14 talukas: Ramtek, Umred, Kalameshwar, Katol, Kamptee, Kuhi, Narkhed, Nagpur, Nagpur Rural, Parseoni, Bhiwapur, Mouda, Savner and Hingna.

Sub-Divisions and Tahsils in Nagpur District
Sub-Division	Tahsils
Nagpur City	Nagpur City
Nagpur Gramin	Nagpur Gramin; Hingna
Kamptee	Kamptee; Mauda
Umred	Umred; Bhiwapur; Kuhi
Ramtek	Ramtek; Parseoni
Saoner	Saoner; Kalmeshwar
Katol	Katol; Narkhed

Nagpur district has 12 Vidhan Sabha constituencies: Nagpur South West, Nagpur South, Nagpur East, Nagpur Central, Nagpur West, Nagpur North, Katol, Savner, Hingna, Umred, Kamthi and Ramtek. The first six constituencies are part of Nagpur Lok Sabha constituency and rest are part of Ramtek Lok Sabha constituency.

== Administration ==
=== Members of Parliament ===
- Nitin Gadkari (BJP)
  (Nagpur Lok Sabha)
- Shyamkumar (Bablu) Barve (INC)
  (Ramtek Lok Sabha)

=== Guardian Minister ===
Guardian Minister Nagpur
- Emblem of India
- Incumbent; Chandrashekhar Bawankule since 18 January 2025
- Style: The Honourable
- Appointer: Chief Minister of Maharashtra
- Term length: 5 years / No time limit
- Website: nagpur.gov.in//

==== List of Guardian Minister ====
Name	Term of office
Devendra Fadnavis	24 September 2022 - 26 November 2024
Chandrashekhar Bawankule	18 January 2025 - Incumbent

=== District Magistrate/Collector ===
- Dr.Vipin Itankar (IAS) (2018 - Incumbent)

== Demographics ==
Historical population
Year	Pop.	±% p.a.
1901	748,489	—
1911	806,287	+0.75%
1921	789,940	−0.20%
1931	936,987	+1.72%
1941	1,056,537	+1.21%
1951	1,230,535	+1.54%
1961	1,508,455	+2.06%
1971	1,942,688	+2.56%
1981	2,588,811	+2.91%
1991	3,287,139	+2.42%
2001	4,067,637	+2.15%
2011	4,653,570	+1.35%

Religions in Nagpur district (2011)
Religion	Percent
Hinduism	75.04%
Buddhism	14.36%
Islam	8.40%
Christianity	0.74%
Jainism	0.53%
Sikhism	0.44%
Other or not stated	0.49%

According to the 2011 census Nagpur district had a population of 4,653,570, roughly equal to the nation of Ireland or the US state of South Carolina. This gives it a ranking of 29th in India (out of a total of 640). The district has a population density of 470 inhabitants per square kilometre (1,200/sq mi) . Its population growth rate over the decade 2001–2011 was 14.39%. Nagpur has a sex ratio of 948 females for every 1000 males, and a literacy rate of 89.52%. 68.31% of the population live in urban areas. Scheduled Castes and Scheduled Tribes make up 18.65% and 9.40% of the population respectively.

Year	Male	Female	Total Population	Change	Religion (%)							
Year	Male	Female	Total Population	Change	Hindu	Muslim	Christian	Sikhs	Buddhist	Jain	Other religions and persuasions	Religion not stated
2001	2105314	1962323	4067637	-	75.980	7.294	0.779	0.483	14.486	0.556	0.360	0.063
2011	2384975	2268595	4653570	14.405	75.044	8.402	0.745	0.440	14.356	0.527	0.262	0.226

Languages in Nagpur district (2011)
1. Marathi (70.1%)
2. Hindi (17.7%)
3. Urdu (4.20%)
4. Chhattisgarhi (1.39%)
5. Gondi (1.09%)
6. Sindhi (0.97%)
7. Others (4.53%)

At the time of the 2011 Census of India, 70.11% of the population spoke Marathi, 17.71% Hindi, 4.20% Urdu, 1.39% Chhattisgarhi, 1.09% Gondi and 0.97% Sindhi as their first language.

=== Urban areas ===
The current District Collector is Abhishek Krishna. Nagpur district is made up of the following administrative bodies:

- Nagpur Municipal Corporation
- Katol Municipal Council
- Saoner Municipal Council
- Ramtek Municipal Council
- Mowad Municipal Council
- Khapa Municipal Council
- Umred Municipal Council
- Narkhed Municipal Council
- Kalmeshwar Municipal Council
- Kamptee municipal Council
- Yerkheda nagar panchayat

References: Nagpur Improvement Trust

== Transport ==
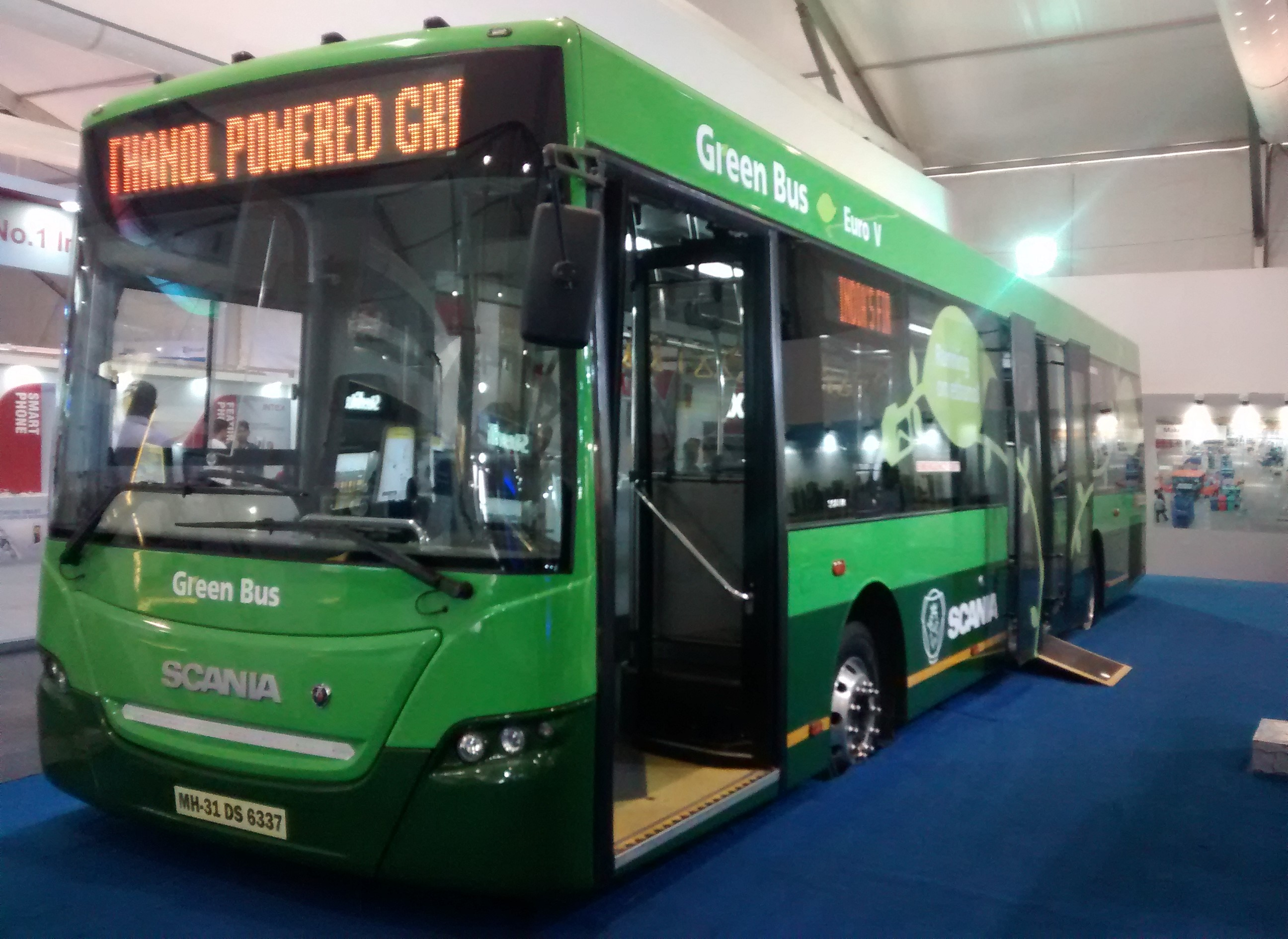
Public transport bus in Nagpur

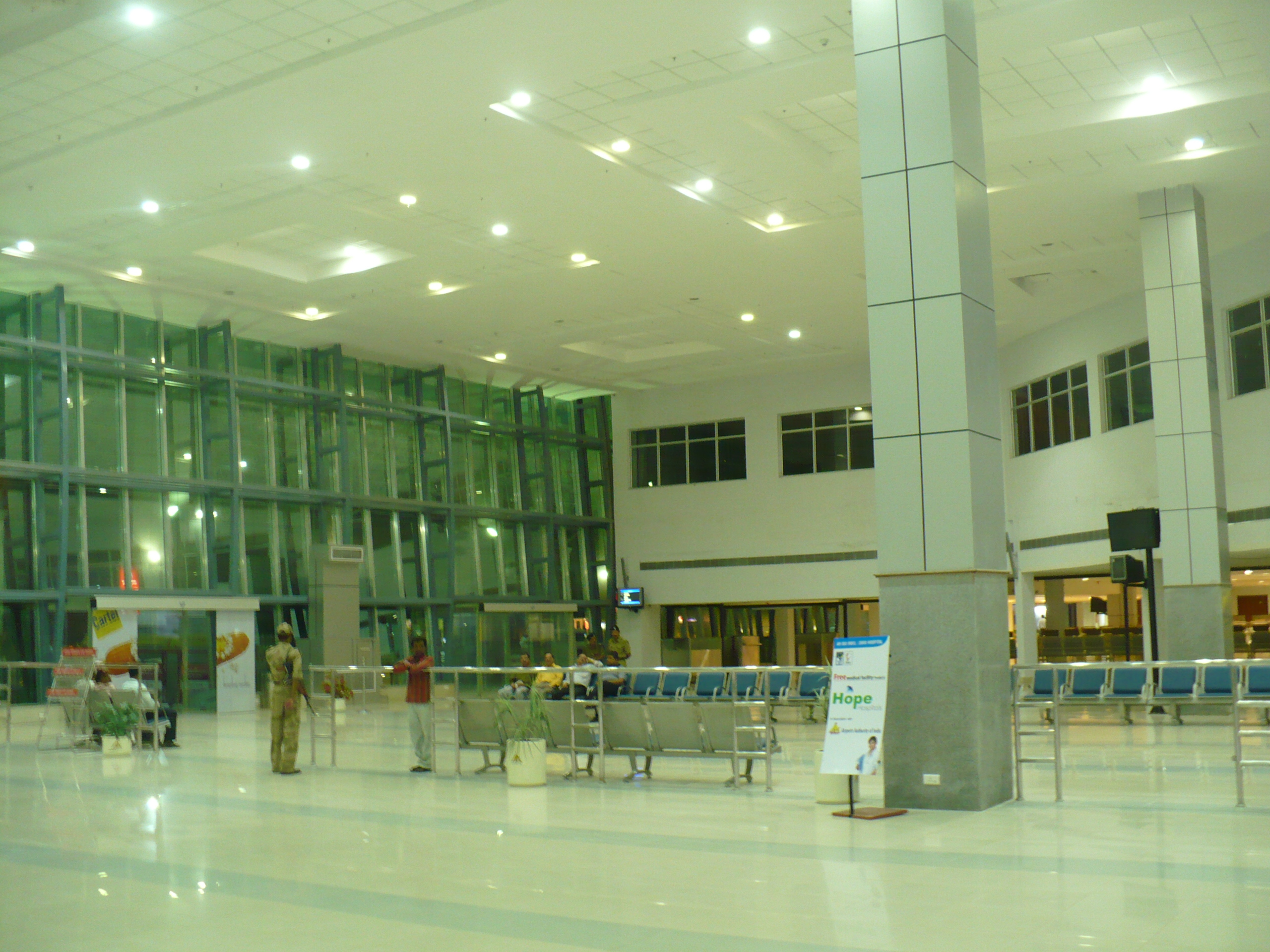
Nagpur's International Airport has the busiest air traffic control room in India.

Due to its central location in India, the Nagpur Railway Station is an important railway junction. It is a transit terminal for trains that connect the country lengthwise and breadthwise, especially trains connecting India's major metropolises, Mumbai to Howrah-Kolkata, Delhi and Jammu to Chennai, Hyderabad, Bangalore and Kanyakumari in the South, as well as western cities such as Pune and Ahmedabad.

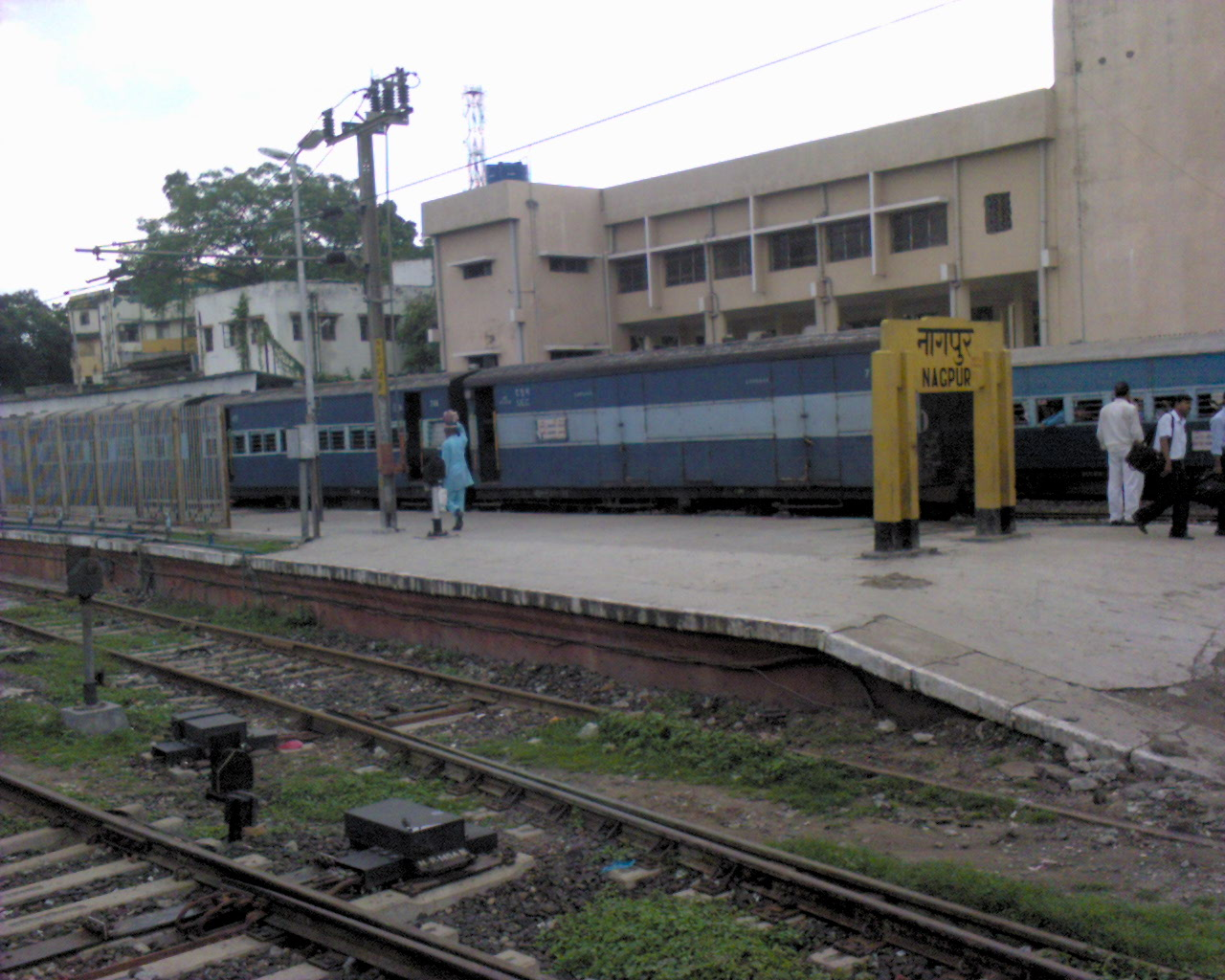
Nagpur Junction

Nagpur is also a major road junction as India's two major national highways, Kanyakumari-Varanasi (NH 7) and Hajira-Kolkata (NH 6), pass through the city. Highway number 69 connects Nagpur to Obaidullaganj near Bhopal. Nagpur is at the junction of Asian HigLanka and AH46 connecting Kharagpur to Dhule.

The MSRTC bus provides affordable transport service in and around the district, reaching even the most remote areas.

Dr. Babasaheb Ambedkar International Airport in Sonegaon, Nagpur, is a domestic and international airport, which connects Nagpur to Mumbai, Delhi, Sharjah, Dubai and Muscat via Doha .
