= Kuhi =

Kuhi kuhikar
- Town and Tehsil
- Location in Maharashtra, India
- Coordinates: = 2011) 21.0108242°N 79.3524241°E
- Country: India
- State: Maharashtra
- District: Nagpur

Government
  - Body: Nagarpanchayat

Area
  - Total: 3.5 km^{2} (1.4 sq mi)

Population
  - Total: 10,436 = 2,011
  - Density: 139.22/km^{2} (360.6/sq mi)

Languages
  - Official: Marathi
- Time zone: UTC+5:30 (IST)
- PIN: 441202
- Telephone code: 07100
- Vehicle registration: MH-40
- Nearest city: Mandhal, Umrer, Nagpur
- Lok Sabha constituency: Ramtek
- Civic agency: Nagarpanchayat President (vacant)

Kuhi is a town and a tehsil in the Umred subdivision of the Nagpur district in Nagpur, India. Kuhi is located 40 km from Nagpur District.Kuhi is two town areas. One is Kuhi and other is Bhojapur. It comes under the revenue division of Berar region in the state of Maharashtra.

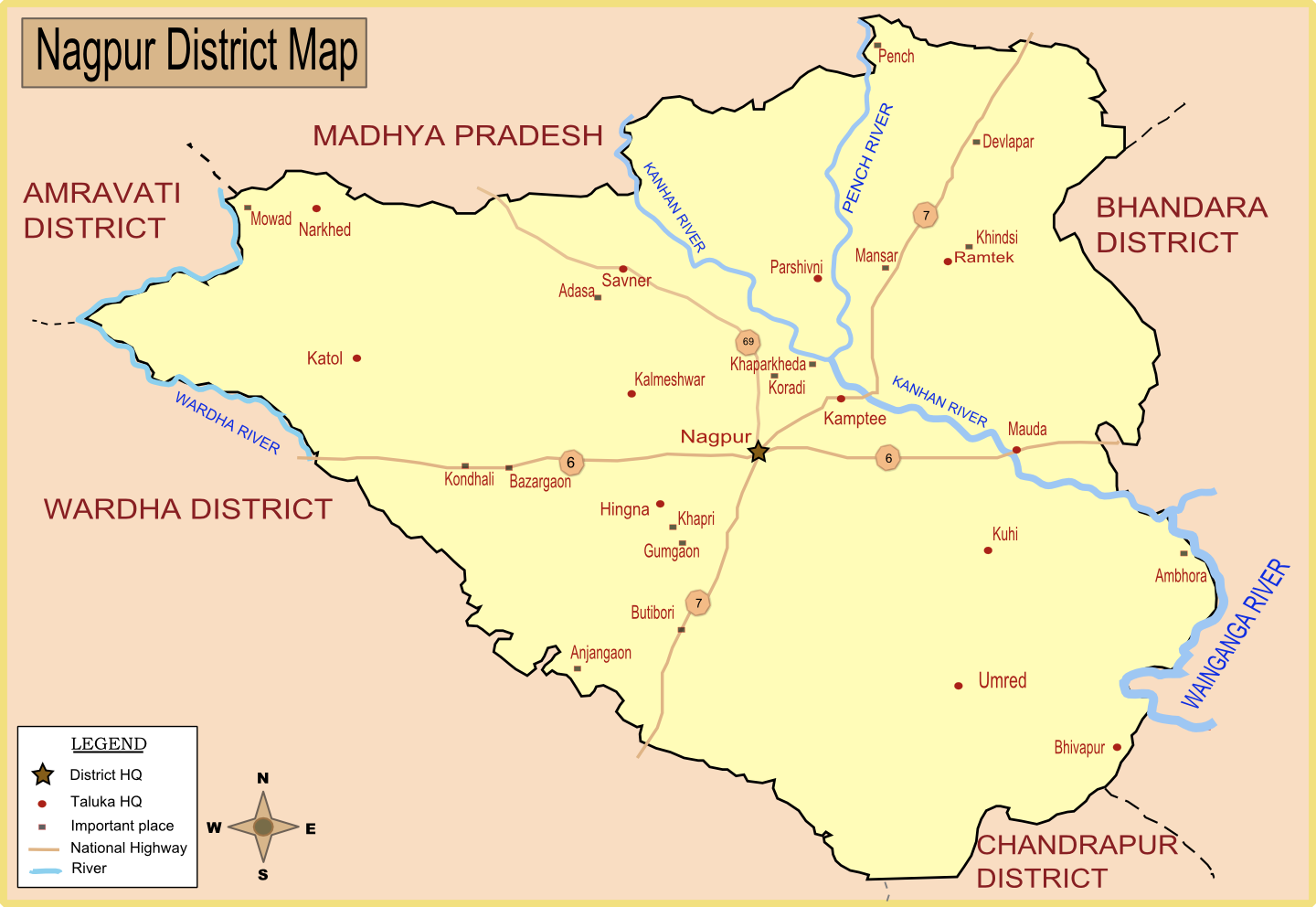
Map of Nagpur district showing Kuhi.

It is located along the banks of the Nag River.

== Demographics ==
AS per Indian government census of 2011, the population was 1,23,977.

Year	Male	Female	Total Population	Change	Religion (%)							
Year	Male	Female	Total Population	Change	Hindu	Muslim	Christian	Sikhs	Buddhist	Jain	Other religions and persuasions	Religion not stated
2001	64066	62250	126316	-	79.830	1.014	0.126	0.021	18.853	0.051	0.039	0.066
2011	63104	60873	123977	-1.852	80.661	1.212	0.140	0.028	17.210	0.058	0.013	0.678
