= Kamthikhairy Dam =

Pench Project (Kamthikhairy Dam)
- Location within Maharashtra
- Official name: Pench Project (Kamthikhairy Dam) D01100
- Location: Nagpur
- Coordinates: 21.4608421°N 79.1902631°E
- Construction began: 1970
- Opening date: 1976
- Owners: Government of Maharashtra, India

Dam and spillways
- Type of dam: Earthfill
- Impounds: Pench river
- Height: 32 m (105 ft)
- Length: 1,876 m (6,155 ft)
- Dam volume: 4,928 km^{3} (1,182 cu mi)

Reservoir
- Total capacity: 180,000 km^{3} (43,000 cu mi)
- Surface area: 23,653 km^{2} (9,132 sq mi)

Kamthikhairy Dam, also called Pench Dam, is on the Pench river near Parshivni in the state of Maharashtra, India. The dam was constructed for irrigation, and supplies water to two districts of Maharashtra, Nagpur and Bhandara. The dam is located in the West Pench National Park Range, surrounded by forested hills, and is 54 km north of Nagpur.

== Specifications ==
The height of the dam above its lowest foundation is 32 m (105 ft), and its length is 1,876 m (6,155 ft). The volume content is 4,928 km^{3} (1,182 cu mi) and gross storage capacity is 230,000 km^{3} (55,000 cu mi).

== See also ==
- Dams in Maharashtra
- List of reservoirs and dams in India
