= Cherla mandal =

Cherla Mandal
- Mandal
- Location in Telangana, India Cherla Mandal (India)
- Coordinates: 18.075°N 80.827°E
- Country: India
- State: Telangana
- District: Bhadradri Kothagudem
- Founder: Nadimpalli Perraju (1890- 1925)(Zamindaar)
- Elevation: 78 m (256 ft)

Languages
  - Official: Telugu
- Time zone: UTC+5:30 (IST)
- Postal code: 507133
- Vehicle registration: TS
- Website: telangana.gov.in

Cherla is a mandal in Bhadradri Kothagudem district in the state of Telangana. It is located on the banks of River Godavari.

== Geography ==
Cherla is a small town located on the banks of River Godavari at 18°04′30″N 80°49′37″E. It has an average elevation of 78 metres (259 ft) and is also close to the Taliperu tributary of the Godavari.

== Irrigation ==
The Taliperu Project is a medium irrigation project across the Taliperu river, a major tributary of the river Godavari, near Peddamidisileru village in Charla. It has an ayakut utilisation of 2,600 acres (11 km^{2}).
