= Sircilla Assembly constituency =

Constituency of the Telangana legislative assembly in India

Coordinates: 18.39°N 78.81°E

Sircilla
- Constituency No. 29 for the Telangana Legislative Assembly
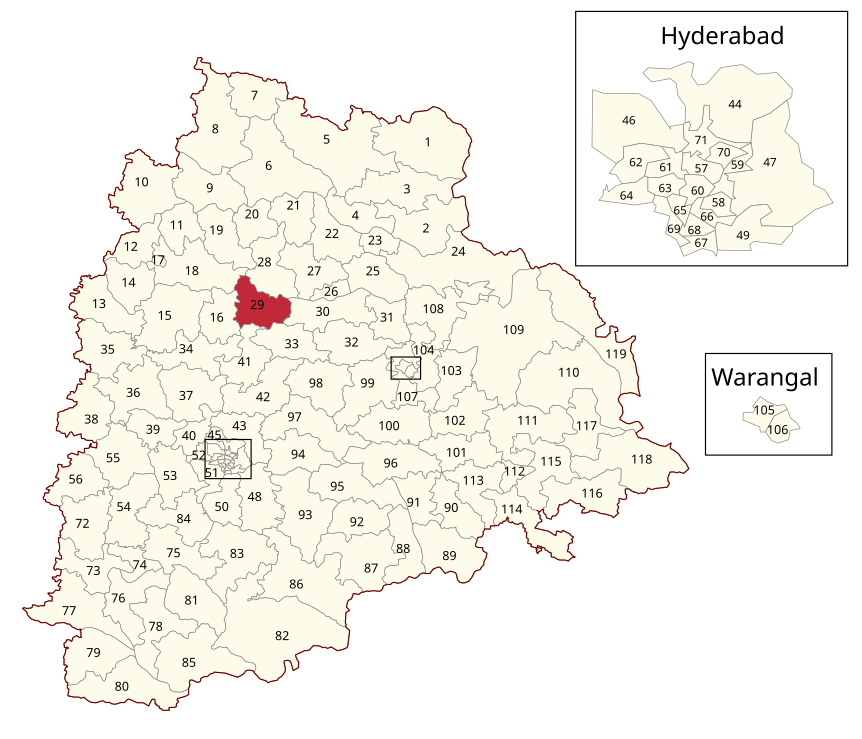
- Location of Sircilla Assembly constituency within Telangana

Constituency details
- Country: India
- Region: South India
- State: Telangana
- District: Rajanna Sircilla
- Lok Sabha constituency: Karimnagar
- Established: 1951
- Total electors: 2,27,883
- Reservation: None

Member of Legislative Assembly
- 3rd Telangana Legislative Assembly
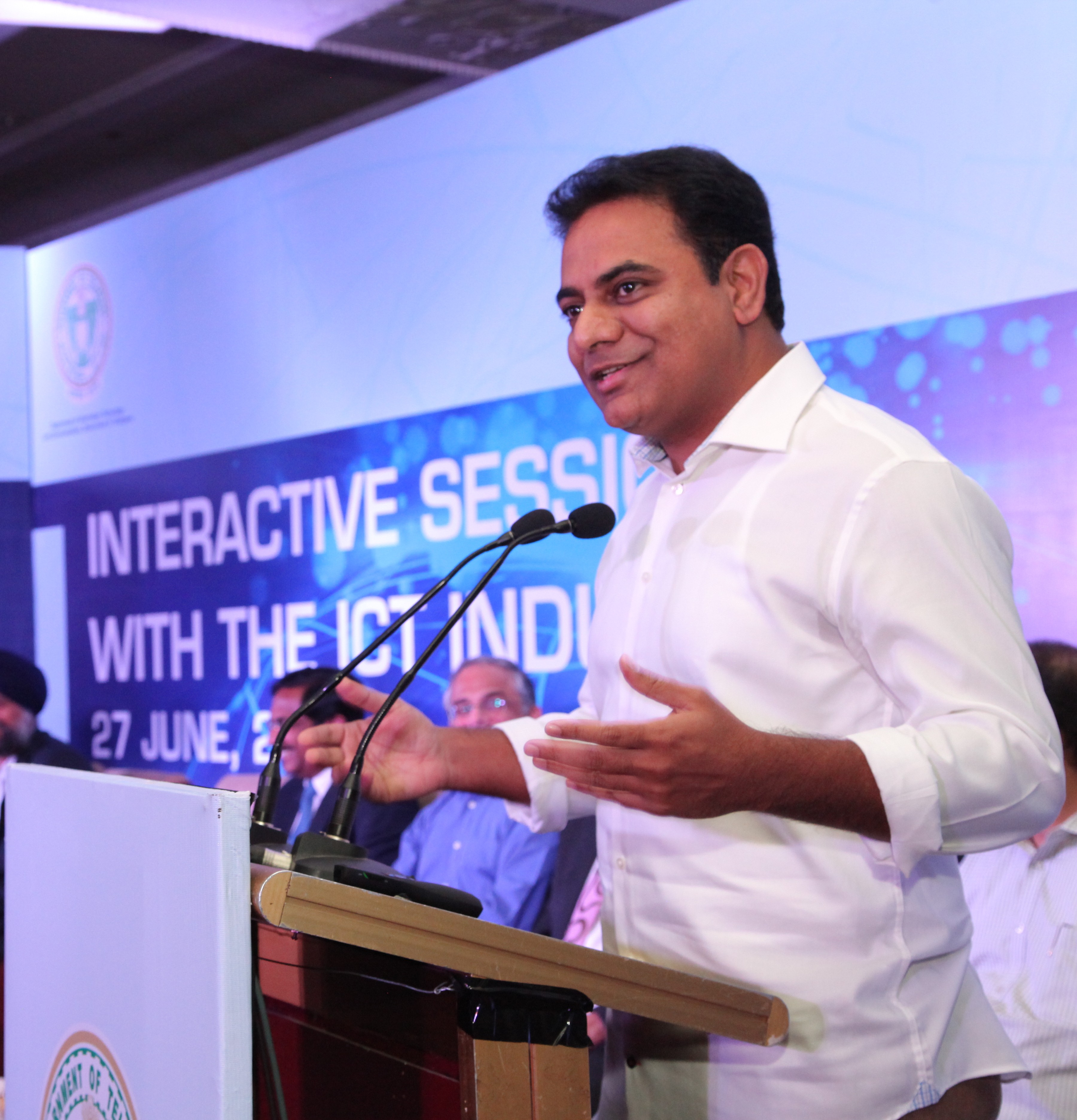
- Incumbent K T Ramarao
- Party: Bharat Rashtra Samithi
- Elected year: 2023

Siricilla Assembly constituency is a constituency of the Telangana Legislative Assembly, India. Sircilla is a town and the district headquarters of Rajanna Sircilla district in the Indian state of Telangana.

Kalvakuntla Taraka Rama Rao, the current working president of Bharat Rashtra Samithi is representing the constituency for the fourth consecutive term.

== Mandals ==
The assembly constituency presently comprises the following mandals:

Mandal
Sircilla
Yellareddipet
Gambhiraopet
Mustabad
Thangalapally
Veernapally

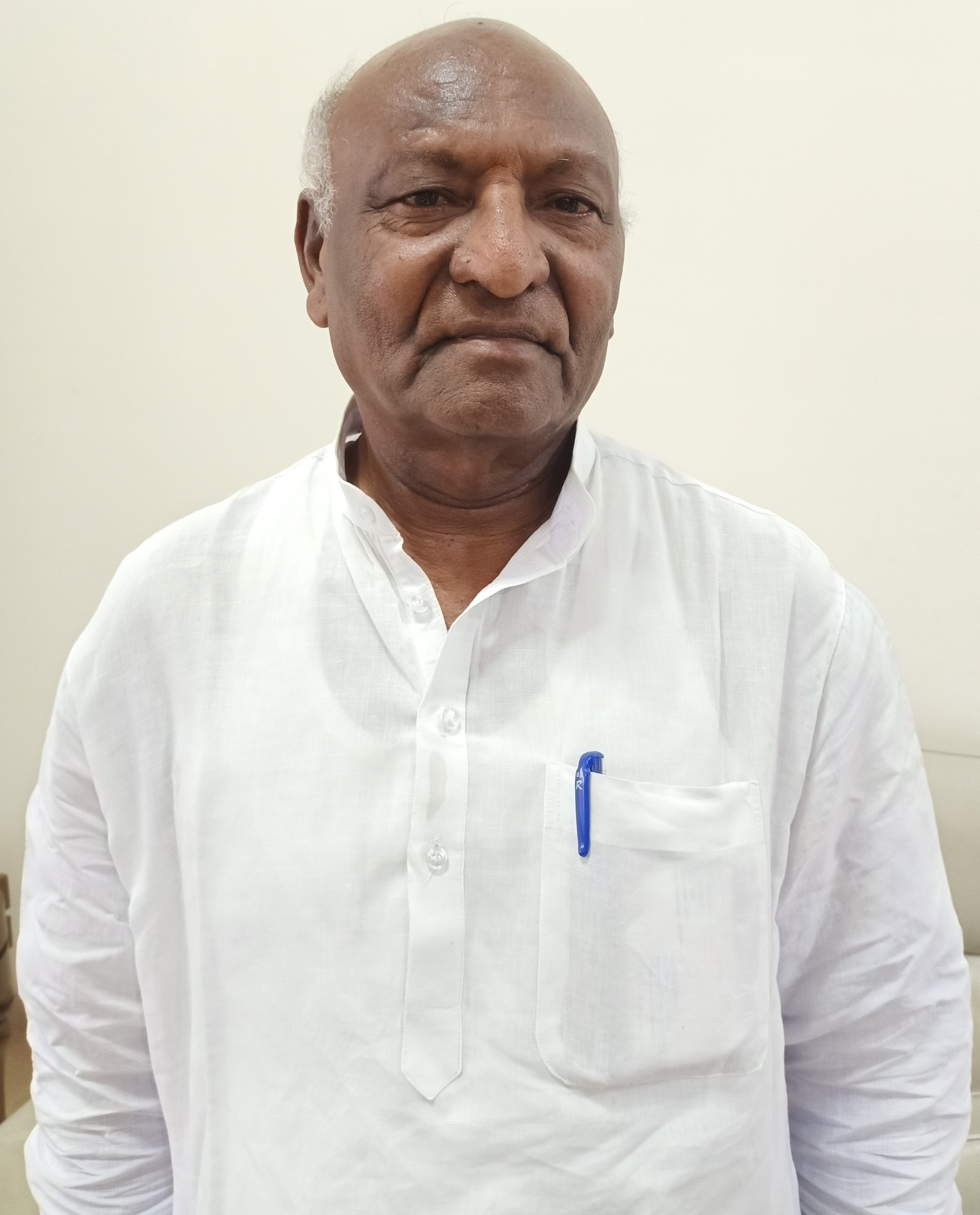
Vachidi Mohan Reddy, Sircilla Assembly constituency Ex MLA - 1983

== Members of Legislative Assembly ==
Year	Winning Candidate	Party
Hyderabad State
1952	Joganpalli Anand Rao	People's Democratic Front
1952	Joganpalli Rajmani Devi	Scheduled Castes Federation
United Andhra Pradesh
1957	K. Narsimha rao	People's Democratic Front
1957	Amritlal Shukla	People's Democratic Front
1962	Juvvadi Narsinga Rao	Indian National Congress
1967	C. Rajeshwara Rao	Communist Party of India
1972	Juvvadi Narsinga Rao	Indian National Congress
1978	C. Rajeshwara Rao	Communist Party of India
1983	Vachidi Mohan Rao	Telugu Desam Party
1985	C. Rajeshwara Rao	Communist Party of India
1989	N. V. Krishna rao	Independent politician
1994	C. Rajeshwara Rao	Communist Party of India
1999	Regulapati Papa Rao	Indian National Congress
2004	C. Rajeshwara Rao	Telugu Desam Party
2009	K. T. Rama Rao	Telangana Rashtra Samithi
2010^	K. T. Rama Rao	Telangana Rashtra Samithi
Telangana
2014	K. T. Rama Rao	Telangana Rashtra Samithi
2018	K. T. Rama Rao	Telangana Rashtra Samithi
2023	K. T. Rama Rao	Bharat Rashtra Samithi

- ^ by-election

== Election results ==
Vote share of Winning candidates
2023	47.28%
2018	70.89%
2014	58.36%
2010 (By-poll)	0.00%
2009	26.92%
2004	48.52%
1999	49.67%
1994	32.26%
1989	29.84%
1985	57.34%
1983	40.02%
1978	40.42%
1972	50.46%
1967	53.53%
1962	45.37%
1957	19.77%
1957	19.76%
1952	34.56%
1952	28.44%

=== 2023 ===
2023 Telangana Legislative Assembly election: Sircilla
Party	Candidate	Votes	%	±%
BRS	K. T. Rama Rao	89,244	47.28	
INC	K. K. Mahender Reddy	59,557	31.56	
BJP	Rani Rudrama Reddy	18,328	9.71	
BSP	Pittala Bhoomesh	7,585	4.02	
NOTA	None of the Above	842	0.45	
IND	9 Independent Candidates	6,551	3.47	
OTH	8 Other Party Candidates	6,633	3.51	
Majority		29,687	15.72	
Turnout		188,740		
BRS hold		Swing		

=== 2018 ===
2018 Telangana Legislative Assembly election: Sircilla
Party	Candidate	Votes	%	±%
TRS	K. T. Rama Rao	125,213	70.89	
INC	K. K. Mahender Reddy	36,204	20.50	
BSP	Avunoori Ramakanth	3,245	1.84	
BJP	Mallugari Narsa Goud	3,243	1.84	
NOTA	None of the Above	2,321	1.31	
IND	2 Independent Candidates	2,550	1.44	
OTH	7 Other Party Candidates	3,854	2.18	
Majority		89,009	50.39	
Turnout		176,630	80.88	
TRS hold		Swing		

=== 2014 ===
2014 Telangana Legislative Assembly election: Sircilla
Party	Candidate	Votes	%	±%
TRS	K. T. Rama Rao	92,135	58.36	
INC	Konduru Ravinder Rao	39,131	24.79	
BJP	Akula Vijaya	14,494	9.18	
RPI(A)	Reddymalla Srinivas	3,345	2.12	
BSP	Anagandula Venkanna	1,815	1.15	
NOTA	None of the Above	1,650	1.05	
IND	Gopi Reddaveni	1,637	1.04	
IND	Anthaiah Kodi	1,406	0.89	
YSRCP	Sridhar Reddy Velumula	803	0.51	
AAP	D. Anandam	800	0.51	
IND	Challa Balreddy	653	0.41	
Majority		53,004	33.57	
Turnout		157,869	73.62	
TRS hold		Swing		

=== 2010 by-election ===
2010 Sircilla by-election
Party	Candidate	Votes	%	±%
TRS	K. T. Rama Rao	87,876	66.05	
INC	K. K. Mahender Reddy	19,657	14.78	
TDP	P. K. Kumar	3,509	2.64	
IND	G. P. Chowdari	3,411	2.56	{{{change}}}
IND	N. P. Ramulu	2,974	2.24	{{{change}}}
Majority		68,219	51.27	{{{change}}}
Turnout		133,045	74.34	{{{change}}}

=== 2009 ===
2009 Andhra Pradesh Legislative Assembly election: Sircilla
Party	Candidate	Votes	%	±%
TRS	K. T. Rama Rao	36,783	26.92	
IND	K. K. Mahender Reddy	36,612	26.80	
PRP	Gajula Balaiah	22,988	16.82	
INC	Gudla Manjula	13,235	9.69	
BJP	Aravalli Chandrashekhar Rao	9,269	6.78	
BSP	Konduri Gandhi	4,178	3.06	
IND	Akku Ramchandram	2,407	1.76	
IND	Jamalpur Madanlal	2,362	1.73	
IND	Pakala Rajamallaiah	2,201	1.61	
IND	Vangari Narsaiah	1,490	1.09	
LSP	R. Santosh Babu	1,237	0.91	
IND	Amberi Laxminarayana	1,198	0.88	
IND	G. Laxminarsamma	868	0.64	
IND	Kalluri Raju	783	0.57	
MCPI(S)	Janardhan Sirimalla	597	0.44	
RPI(A)	Reddimalla Srinivas	429	0.31	
Majority		171	0.12	
Turnout		136,637		
Swing to TRS from TDP		Swing		

=== 2004 ===
2004 Andhra Pradesh Legislative Assembly election: Sircilla
Party	Candidate	Votes	%	±%
TDP	Chennamaneny Rajeshwar Rao	64,003	48.52	
TRS	Regulapati Papa Rao	46,995	35.63	
BSP	Y. Shankar Goud	7,747	5.87	
IND	Gundlapelli Srinivas	6,200	4.70	
JP	Vuchidi Mohan Reddy	3,808	2.89	
IND	Baddam Lachi Reddy	1,321	1.00	
IND	Puli Laxmipathi	984	0.75	
IND	Pampari Chandra Shekar	842	0.64	
Majority		17,008	12.89	
Turnout		131,900		
Swing to TDP from INC		Swing		

=== 1999 ===
1999 Andhra Pradesh Legislative Assembly election: Sircilla
Party	Candidate	Votes	%	±%
INC	Regulapati Papa Rao	58,638	49.67	
TDP	Chennamaneni Rajeshwar Rao	48,986	41.50	
CPI	Paravasthu Prem Chand	7,792	6.60	
ATDP	Chepuri Buchaiah	1,283	1.09	
NTDP	Shaik Bhashu Miyya	824	0.70	
AJBP	Nomula Raghupathi Reddy	528	0.45	
Majority		9,652	8.17	
Turnout		124,591	66.98	
Swing to INC from CPI		Swing		

=== 1994 ===
1994 Andhra Pradesh Legislative Assembly election: Sircilla
Party	Candidate	Votes	%	±%
CPI	Chennamaneni Rajeshwar Rao	36,154	32.26	
IND	Regulapati Papa Rao	31,637	28.23	
INC	Dr. Puli Vittal	15,129	13.50	
IND	Juvvadi Chalapathi Rao	14,796	13.20	
BJP	Kokkula Dayanand	5,866	5.23	
BSP	Kannam Raghu	5,073	4.53	
IND	Gangipalli Lachaiah	1,363	1.22	
IND	Pulkam Narsaiah	827	0.74	
LP	Ch. Anand Rao	785	0.70	
IND	S. K. Bhashumiya	436	0.39	
Majority		4,517	4.03	
Turnout		115,435	66.82	
Swing to CPI from Independent		Swing		

=== 1989 ===
1989 Andhra Pradesh Legislative Assembly election: Sircilla
Party	Candidate	Votes	%	±%
IND	N. V. Krishnaiah	26,430	29.84	
IND	Regulapati Papa Rao	25,906	29.25	
INC	J. Narsingha Rao	21,291	24.04	
CPI	Ch. Rajeshwar Rao	10,188	11.50	
IND	Gangipalli Lachaiah	2,789	3.15	
LKD(B)	P. Indira Gandhi	655	0.74	
IND	Nerella Anjaiah	518	0.58	
BSP	Kannam Raghu	471	0.53	
IND	Sangula Ram Kishan	313	0.35	
Majority		524	0.59	
Turnout		97,303	60.06	
Swing to Independent from CPI		Swing		

=== 1985 ===
1985 Andhra Pradesh Legislative Assembly election: Sircilla
Party	Candidate	Votes	%	±%
CPI	Ch. Rajeshwar Rao	43,664	57.34	
INC	Rudra Shankaraiah	20,101	26.40	
IND	Kashipathy	7,180	9.43	
IND	Goli Ganga Reddy	3,124	4.10	
IND	N. Laxminarayana	655	0.86	
IND	B. Papamma	456	0.60	
IND	Khaja Safiddin	411	0.54	
IND	Kodam Satyanarayana	280	0.37	
LKD	Hinge Lingaiah	278	0.37	
Majority		23,563	30.94	
Turnout		77,829	60.07	
Swing to CPI from Independent		Swing		

=== 1983 ===
1983 Andhra Pradesh Legislative Assembly election: Sircilla
Party	Candidate	Votes	%	±%
IND	Vachidi Mohan Reddy	27,508	40.02	
INC	Regulapati Papa Rao	19,809	28.82	
CPI	Chennamaneni Rajeshwara Rao	15,648	22.76	
IND	Polsani Vittal Rao	3,032	4.41	
IND	K. Veera Chari	953	1.39	
IND	Borra Papamma	819	1.19	
IND	Pulkam Narsaiah	767	1.12	
IND	Sirigiri Bombay Narsaiah	203	0.30	
Majority		7,699	11.20	
Turnout		70,328	62.58	
Swing to Independent from CPI		Swing		

=== 1978 ===
1978 Andhra Pradesh Legislative Assembly election: Sircilla
Party	Candidate	Votes	%	±%
CPI	Chennamaneni Rajeshwar Rao	28,685	40.42	
INC(I)	Nagula Mallaiah	18,807	26.50	
JP	Juvvadi Narsing Rao	14,206	20.02	
IND	Juvvadi Chalapathi Rao	6,903	9.73	
BCM	Gudise Kanthaiah	1,569	2.21	
IND	Thota Raghavulu	806	1.14	
Majority		9,878	13.92	
Turnout		73,187	69.25	
Swing to CPI from INC		Swing		

=== 1972 ===
1972 Andhra Pradesh Legislative Assembly election: Sirchilla
Party	Candidate	Votes	%	±%
INC	Juvvadi Narsinga Rao	25,821	50.46	
CPI	C. Rajeshwara Rao	23,135	45.21	
IND	Thota Raghavulu	1,816	3.55	
STS	Regulapati Satyanarayana Rao	400	0.78	
Majority		2,686	5.25	
Turnout		52,856	59.84	
Swing to INC from CPI		Swing		

=== 1967 ===
1967 Andhra Pradesh Legislative Assembly election: Sircilla
Party	Candidate	Votes	%	±%
CPI	C. Rajeshwara Rao	23,525	53.53	
INC	Juvvadi Narsinga Rao	15,193	34.57	
IND	V. Narsiah	3,479	7.92	
IND	G. Gangaram	1,754	3.99	
Majority		8,332	18.96	
Turnout		46,249	59.71	
Swing to CPI from INC		Swing		

=== 1962 ===
1962 Andhra Pradesh Legislative Assembly election: Sircilla
Party	Candidate	Votes	%	±%
INC	Juwwadi Narsing Rao	15,811	45.37	
IND	Gudla Lakshminarsiah	6,703	19.23	
IND	Amruthalal Shukla	6,390	18.34	
CPI	Baddam Yella Reddy	3,482	9.99	
IND	Govardhan	2,464	7.07	
Majority		9,108	26.14	
Turnout		36,777	59.82	
INC win (new seat)				

=== 1957 ===
1957 Andhra Pradesh Legislative Assembly election: Sirsilla (2-member constituency)
Party	Candidate	Votes	%	±%
PDF	K. Narsiah (SC)	19,106	19.77	
PDF	Amritlal Shukla	19,099	19.76	
INC	Rajamanidevi (SC)	18,351	18.99	
INC	A. V. Raja Reddy	16,708	17.29	
IND	R. Kamalakar Rao	10,923	11.30	
IND	T. Malliah	6,465	6.69	
IND	Lingiah (SC)	5,988	6.20	
Majority		7	0.01	
Turnout		96,640	95.01	

=== 1952 ===
1952 Hyderabad State Legislative Assembly election: Sircilla (2-member constituency)
Party	Candidate	Votes	%	±%
PDF	Joganpalli Anand Rao	38,421	34.56	
SCF	J. M. Rajmani Devi	31,624	28.44	
Socialist	R. M. Kamala Kar Rao	13,395	12.05	
INC	S. R. Babiah	12,758	11.47	
INC	Yadagiri Hanmanth Rao	10,027	9.02	
Socialist	Yadagiri Rao	4,959	4.46	
Turnout		111,184	94.27	

== Trivia ==
- Kalvakuntla Taraka Rama Rao set record as the first time won two consecutive general elections from Sircilla constituency.
- Regulapati Papa Rao is the first MLA for TRS, who quit Congress and joined TRS on May 9, 2001, within a fortnight of the party's founding by KCR. He was the party's only MLA for about 10 months.
- Freedom fighter and active member of Telangana Rebellion Chennamaneni Rajeshwar Rao was the five times winner of the constituency.
