= Upper Manair Dam =

- Location within Telangana Location within India
- Official name: اوپر مانیر ڈیم; Upper Manair Dam
- Location: Rajanna Sircilla district, Telangana, India
- Coordinates: 18°16′13″N 78°32′40″E
- Construction began: 1943 (by Nizam)
- Opening date: 1950; 76 years ago

Dam and spillways
- Impounds: Manair River and Kudlair River
- Height: 31 metres (102 ft) from river level
- Length: 9,201 metres (30,187 ft)

Reservoir
- Creates: Upper Manair Reservoir
- Total capacity: 62,387,000 m^{3} (50,578 acre⋅ft)
- Active capacity: 61,439,000 m^{3} (49,809 acre⋅ft)
- Surface area: 15.3 km^{2} (5.9 sq mi)

The Upper Manair Dam (Urdu: اوپر مانیر ڈیم) is a dam on the Manair River, at Narmal Village, Gambhiraopet mandal, Rajanna Sircilla district, Telangana by Nizam.

Situated at narmala village, rajanna sircilla district. Foundation stone laid in 1943 by Nizam of Hyderabad State presented by Janab Shaikhaan Sahab . Back water present mainly in Lachapet, Srigadha and Kollamaddi. Across the back water at srigadha bridge is constructed in the year 2018 and opened by minister Sri Kalvakuntla taraka ramarao

== See also ==
- Sriram Sagar Project
- Lower Manair Dam
- Mid Manair Dam
- Sripada Yellampalli project
- Nizam Sagar
- Kaddam Project
- Pranahita Chevella
- Alisagar lift irrigation scheme
- Sri Komaram Bheem Project
- Icchampally Project
