= Kothapally, Karimnagar district =

Village in Telangana, India

Kothapally
- village
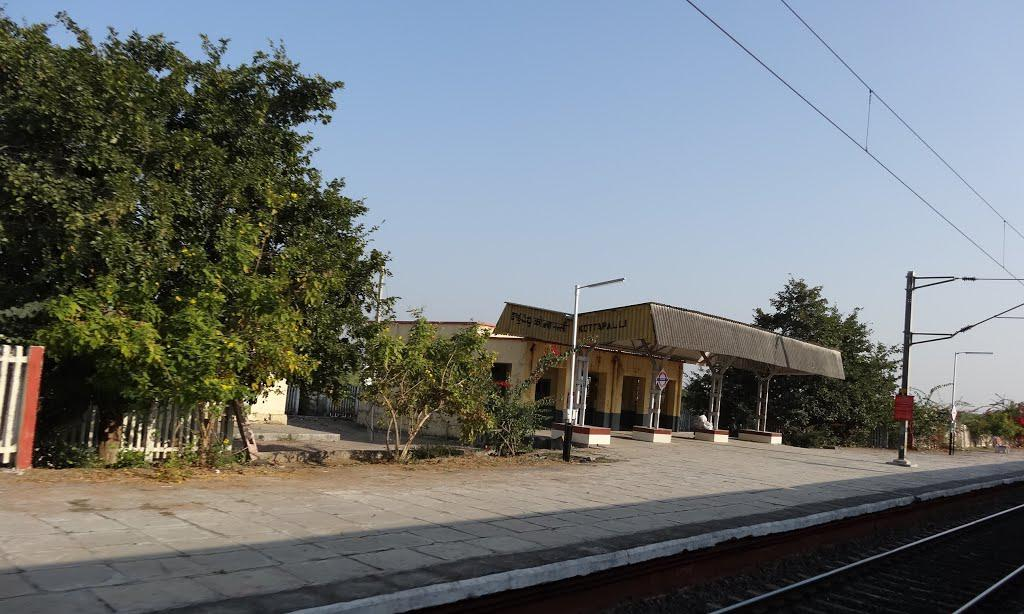

- Location in Telangana, India Kothapally (India)
- Coordinates: 18°15′35.51″N 78°35′4.93″E
- Country: India
- State: Telangana
- District: Rajanna Siricilla district
- Talukas: Gambhiraopet

Government
  - Member of Parliament: Bandi Sanjay
  - Member of the Legislative Assembly: K. T. Rama Rao
  - Sarpanch: (Akkapally Rajanarsimha reddy)

Area
  - Total: 34.9 km^{2} (13.5 sq mi)

Population
  - Total: 10,000(around)
  - Density: 191/km^{2} (490/sq mi)

Languages
  - Official: Telugu
- Time zone: UTC+5:30 (IST)
- PIN: 505304
- Telephone code: 91-8723
- Vehicle registration: TG23
- Literacy: 62%
- Lok Sabha constituency: Karimnagar
- Vidhan Sabha constituency: Siricilla
- Avg. annual temperature: 32 °C (90 °F)
- Avg. summer temperature: 40 °C (104 °F)
- Avg. winter temperature: 20 °C (68 °F)

Kothapally is one of the Villages in Gambhiraopet mandal which is in Karimnagar District in Telangana State in India. Rajpet, Gambhiraopet, Lingannapet, Kollamaddi, Srigada, Shilajinagar and Mucharla are the surrounding villages to this village.

== Education ==
Kothapally has an average literacy rate of 62%. From a decade there has been a good response for education. Literacy rate has been improved a lot. Girl education is highly encouraged in the village. There are 4 Mandal parishad primary schools, 1 Zilla Parishad High School, 4 Anganwadi centres and 2 English medium schools (Saraswathi school and SVS school) in the village. People prefer colleges in Hyderabad, Kamareddy and Karimnagar for higher studies. Hundreds of students go to colleges in Karimnagar as day scholars. Students completed Intermediate are around 850, Graduation are 350 and Post graduation are 200. Many students are joining in BTech/B.E courses. Recently professional degrees are becoming popular in the village and people are attracted to them.
