= Obulapuram =

Obulapuram may refer to one of the following villages in India:

- Obulapuram, Anantapur district, in Andhra Pradesh
  - Obulapuram Mining Company, company in Anantapur district
- Obulapuram, Rajanna Sircilla district, in Telangana
