= Pothugal =

Pothugal pothuganti
- village
- Country: India
- State: Telangana
- District: Rajanna Sircilla
  - Density: 15,000/km^{2} (39,000/sq mi)

Languages
  - Official: Telugu
- Time zone: UTC+5:30 (IST)
- PIN: 505404
- Telephone code: 08723
- Vehicle registration: TS
- Nearest city: sircilla

Pothugal is a village in Mustabad mandal in Rajanna Sircilla district in the state of Telangana in India. The main crops are rice and sugar cane and cotton.

It is located 3 km away from Musthabad, 28 km away from Siddipet, and 128 km away from Hyderabad.

The nearly 100-year-old deities of Sri Sita Ramachandra Swami, Lakshmana Swami and Goda Devi went missing for four years and nine months (from 19 January 2010 to 19 October 2014). After numerous padhayatras and other processions carried by Pothugal residents in devotion, the deities were successfully recovered by CCS Police of Karimnagar in October 2014.currently temple is under renovation.

After 12 years of the temple being forgotten, the natives have taken up the task of bringing back the grandeur and liveliness of the temple. This is all being done under the blessings of Sri Sri Sri Tridandi Chinna Jeeyar Swami garu. The prathistha of the idols of the deities is set to be on the 20th of June,2022.

== Present sarpanchs ==
Peddigari yadamma

== Past sarpanchs ==
Thanneeru Rajeswar Rao, Thanneeru Gopal Rao, Vennamaneni Narayana Rao and Thanneer Goutham Rao and Koppu Rajalingavva W/o Koppu Kistaiah.Recently elected single-window chairmen Thanner Bapu Rao.

== Temples ==
Sitha Ramaswamy Devasthanam, Shivalayam and many Hanuman temples, nalla pochamma, erra pochamma, Yellamma, katta maisamma, pedamma, Gangamma, beerappa,

== Facilities ==
Government School for Boys, Government School for Girls, Government Hospital, Government Hostel, co-operative Bank is located in Pothugal, Big play ground,

== Notable people ==
- Aravelly Avanish Rao, cricketer
