= SRiX =

Technology Business Incubator

- Formation: 2018
- Purpose: Business incubator
- Location: Warangal, Telangana
- Key people: Sreedevi Devireddy, CEO
- Website: SRiX Website

SRiX (SR Innovation Exchange) is a Technology Business Incubator (TBI) located in Warangal, Telangana. The incubator was inaugurated by Telangana IT & Panchayat Raj Minister K. T. Rama Rao on 5 March 2018.

== Campus ==
SRiX is located in SR Engineering College campus in Warangal. It is supported by the Department of Science & Technology (DST) and Government of India to accelerate the startup eco-system.
