= Donatekart =

- Type: Privately-held
- Industry: Philanthropy
- Founded: November 11, 2016; 9 years ago
- Founders: Anil Kumar Reddy; Sandeep Sharma; Sarang Bobade
- Fate: Active
- Headquarters: Bangalore, India
- Area served: Indian subcontinent
- Website: donatekart.com

Donatekart is an India-based social enterprise that allows individuals to donate supplies needed to a charity instead of donating money. The organization was founded in 2016 by Anil Kumar Reddy, Sandeep Sharma, and Sarang Bobade. Donatekart acts as an online crowdsourcing platform that assists non-governmental organizations to create campaigns and collect products they require from donors instead of traditional monetary donations. Donatekart enables donors and philanthropists to directly donate required products to charitable organizations online instead of money. Donatekart is incubated by Zone Startups India, an accelerator program run by Bombay Stock Exchange, Mumbai and T-Hub, Hyderabad.

== History ==
Donatekart was founded in 2016 by 2 NIT Nagpur and 1 ICT Mumbai graduate, Sarang Bobade, Sandeep Sharma, Anil Reddy.

The inception of Donatekart began during the Chennai Floods 2015 while volunteering with Goonj Delhi, when the founders noticed that people were buying goods like rice and flour from e-commerce giants like Amazon and Flipkart and shipping them to NGOs. But the on-ground needs were different- people urgently needed tarpaulins, mosquito nets, and blankets. There was a gap in providing donations based on what was needed on-ground.

This realization led to the innovative idea of creating a platform where NGOs could start campaigns by listing the products they required. Donors could then contribute funds for these specific items, ensuring a direct match between contributions and the real needs of the beneficiaries. This visionary concept gave rise to Donatekart, an organization committed to facilitating more effective and need-based philanthropy.

Donatekart delivers the products to the organizations bringing transparency in donations made to non-governmental organization by replacing monetary donations to in-kind donations. Donatekart is a hybrid of crowdfunding and eCommerce and is the first of its type internationally. Donatekart was incubated by Zone Startups India, an accelerator program run by Bombay Stock Exchange (BSE), Mumbai. In 2018, they were incubated by T-Hub, Hyderabad.

=== Initiatives ===
During 2018 Kerala floods, Donatekart collaborated with T-Hub and Goonj and helped procure the relief materials worth Rs.20 million within a week time. This initiative by the organization received coverage by major news agency across India. By April 2019, Donatekart has worked with over 600 organization all over India and has raised over 6 crore worth of products. More than forty thousand donors have channelized donations through the platform to charities from various sectors including education, elderly, medical, animals, women empowerment, humanitarian and disaster relief.

=== Fundings and partnerships ===
In May 2019, Donatekart raised 2.55 Crores in seed funding from LetsVenture and other investors. Shanti Mohan, the founder of LetsVenture joined the board of the organization as part of the round. Vijay Shekhar Sharma, the founder of Paytm, has also endorsed Donatekart in 2018. The organization also initiated a matching donation drive with Yes Foundation, a CSR initiative of Yes Bank, where 7 campaigns were 100% matched by Yes Foundation whenever any donation was made to such campaigns.
