= Obulapuram, Rajanna Sircilla district =

Obulapuram
- Location in Telangana, India Obulapuram (India)
- Coordinates: 18°21′34.6″N 78°54′36.8″E
- Country: India
- State: Telangana
- District: Rajanna Sircilla

Government
  - Type: Grama Panchayat
  - Body: Obulapuram Panchayat

Population (2011)
  - Total: 2,109

Languages
  - Official: Telugu
- Time zone: UTC+5:30 (IST)
- PIN: 505402
- Vehicle registration: TS-23
- Lok Sabha constituency: Karimnagar
- Assembly constituency: Manakondur(SC)

Obulapuram is a village in Ellantakunta mandal in the Rajanna Sircilla district of Telangana state, India. As of the 2011 Census of India, it had a population of 2,109 across 537 households.
