= List of by-elections to the Andhra Pradesh Legislative Assembly =

The following is a list of by-elections held for the Andhra Pradesh Legislative Assembly, India, since its formation in 1956.

== 13th Assembly ==
=== 2010 ===
S.No	Date	Constituency	MLA before election	Party before election	Elected MLA	Party after election
1	27 July 2010	Sirpur	Kaveti Sammaiah	Telangana Rashtra Samithi	Kaveti Sammaiah	Telangana Rashtra Samithi
2	27 July 2010	Chennur	Nallala Odelu	Telangana Rashtra Samithi	Nallala Odelu	Telangana Rashtra Samithi
4	27 July 2010	Mancherial	Gaddam Aravinda Reddy	Telangana Rashtra Samithi	Gaddam Aravinda Reddy	Telangana Rashtra Samithi
15	27 July 2010	Yellareddy	Eanugu Ravinder Reddy	Telangana Rashtra Samithi	Eanugu Ravinder Reddy	Telangana Rashtra Samithi
17	27 July 2010	Nizamabad Urban	Endela Lakshminarayana	Bharatiya Janata Party	Endela Lakshminarayana	Bharatiya Janata Party
20	27 July 2010	Koratla	Kalvakuntla Vidya Sagar Rao	Telangana Rashtra Samithi	Kalvakuntla Vidya Sagar Rao	Telangana Rashtra Samithi
22	27 July 2010	Dharmapuri	Koppula Eshwar	Telangana Rashtra Samithi	Koppula Eshwar	Telangana Rashtra Samithi
28	27 July 2010	Vemulawada	Chennamaneni Ramesh	Telugu Desam Party	Chennamaneni Ramesh	Telangana Rashtra Samithi
29	27 July 2010	Sircilla	K. T. Rama Rao	Telangana Rashtra Samithi	K. T. Rama Rao	Telangana Rashtra Samithi
31	27 July 2010	Huzurabad	Etela Rajender	Telangana Rashtra Samithi	Etela Rajender	Telangana Rashtra Samithi
33	27 July 2010	Siddipet	T. Harish Rao	Telangana Rashtra Samithi	T. Harish Rao	Telangana Rashtra Samithi
105	27 July 2010	Warangal West	Dasyam Vinay Bhasker	Telangana Rashtra Samithi	Dasyam Vinay Bhasker	Telangana Rashtra Samithi

=== 2011 ===
S.No	Date	Constituency	MLA before election	Party before election	Elected MLA	Party after election
248	8 May 2011	Pulivendla	Y. S. Vijayamma	Indian National Congress	Y. S. Vijayamma	YSR Congress Party
14	13 October 2011	Banswada	Pocharam Srinivas Reddy	Telugu Desam Party	Pocharam Srinivas Reddy	Telangana Rashtra Samithi

=== 2012 ===
S.No	Date	Constituency	MLA before election	Party before election	Elected MLA	Party after election
7	10 March 2012	Adilabad	Jogu Ramanna	Telugu Desam Party	Jogu Ramanna	Telangana Rashtra Samithi
16	18 March 2012	Kamareddy	Gampa Govardhan	Telugu Desam Party	Gampa Govardhan	Telangana Rashtra Samithi
74	18 March 2012	Mahbubnagar	N. Rajeshwar Reddy	Independent	Yennam Srinivas Reddy	Bharatiya Janata Party
81	18 March 2012	Nagarkurnool	Nagam Janardhan Reddy	Telugu Desam Party	Nagam Janardhan Reddy	Independent
85	18 March 2012	Kollapur	Jupally Krishna Rao	Indian National Congress	Jupally Krishna Rao	Telangana Rashtra Samithi
99	18 March 2012	Ghanpur Station	T. Rajaiah	Indian National Congress	T. Rajaiah	Telangana Rashtra Samithi
235	18 March 2012	Kovur	Nallapareddy Prasanna Kumar Reddy	Telugu Desam Party	Nallapareddy Prasanna Kumar Reddy	YSR Congress Party
104	12 June 2012	Parkal	Konda Surekha	Indian National Congress	M. Bikshpathi	Telangana Rashtra Samithi
127	12 June 2012	Narasannapeta	Dharmana Krishna Das	Indian National Congress	Dharmana Krishna Das	YSR Congress Party
152	12 June 2012	Payakaraopet	Golla Baburao	Indian National Congress	Golla Baburao	YSR Congress Party
152	12 June 2012	Ramachandrapuram	Pilli Subhash Chandra Bose	Indian National Congress	Thota Trimurthulu	Indian National Congress
177	12 June 2012	Narasapuram	Mudnuri Prasad Raju	Indian National Congress	Kothapalli Subbarayudu	Indian National Congress
186	12 June 2012	Polavaram	Tellam Balaraju	Indian National Congress	Tellam Balaraju	YSR Congress Party
212	12 June 2012	Prathipadu	Mekathoti Sucharitha	Indian National Congress	Mekathoti Sucharitha	YSR Congress Party
220	12 June 2012	Macherla	Pinnelli Ramakrishna Reddy	Indian National Congress	Pinnelli Ramakrishna Reddy	YSR Congress Party
227	12 June 2012	Ongole	Balineni Srinivasa Reddy	Indian National Congress	Balineni Srinivasa Reddy	YSR Congress Party
242	12 June 2012	Udayagiri	Mekapati Chandrasekhar Reddy	Indian National Congress	Mekapati Chandrasekhar Reddy	YSR Congress Party
244	12 June 2012	Rajampet	Akepati Amaranath Reddy	Indian National Congress	Akepati Amaranath Reddy	YSR Congress Party
246	12 June 2012	Kodur	Koramutla Srinivasulu	Indian National Congress	Koramutla Srinivasulu	YSR Congress Party
247	12 June 2012	Rayachoti	Gadikota Srikanth Reddy	Indian National Congress	Gadikota Srikanth Reddy	YSR Congress Party
253	12 June 2012	Allagadda	Shobha Nagi Reddy	Praja Rajyam Party	Shobha Nagi Reddy	YSR Congress Party
263	12 June 2012	Yemmiganur	K. Chennakesava Reddy	Indian National Congress	K. Chennakesava Reddy	YSR Congress Party
267	12 June 2012	Yemmiganur	Kapu Ramachandra Reddy	Indian National Congress	Kapu Ramachandra Reddy	YSR Congress Party
272	12 June 2012	Anantapur Urban	Bodimalla Gurunatha Reddy	Indian National Congress	Bodimalla Gurunatha Reddy	YSR Congress Party
286	12 June 2012	Tirupati	Konidela Chiranjeevi	Praja Rajyam Party	Bhumana Karunakar Reddy	YSR Congress Party

=== 2013 ===
S.No	Date	Constituency	MLA before election	Party before election	Elected MLA	Party after election
76	21 August 2013	Avanigadda	Ambati Brahmanaiah	Telugu Desam Party	Ambati Srihari Prasad	Telugu Desam Party

== 14th Assembly ==
=== 2014 ===
S.No	Date	Constituency	MLA before election	Party before election	Elected MLA	Party after election
1	13 September 2014	Nandigama	Thangirala Prabhakara Rao	Telugu Desam Party	Tangirala Sowmya	Telugu Desam Party
2	8 November 2014	Allagadda	Shobha Nagi Reddy	YSR Congress Party	Akhila Priya Reddy	YSR Congress Party

=== 2015 ===
S.No	Date	Constituency	MLA before election	Party before election	Elected MLA	Party after election
1	13 February 2015	Tirupati	M.Venkataramana	Telugu Desam Party	M Suguna	Telugu Desam Party

=== 2017 ===
S.No	Date	Constituency	MLA before election	Party before election	Elected MLA	Party after election
139	23 August 2017	Nandyal	Bhuma Nagi Reddy	YSR Congress Party	Bhuma Brahmananda Reddy	Telugu Desam Party

== 15th Assembly ==
=== 2021 ===
S.No	Date	Constituency	MLA before election	Party before election	Elected MLA	Party after election
124	30 October 2021	Badvel	Gunthoti Venkata Subbaiah	YSR Congress Party	Dasari Sudha	YSR Congress Party

=== 2022 ===
Date	S.No	Constituency	MLA before election	Party before election	Elected MLA	Party after election
23 June 2022	115	Atmakur	Mekapati Goutham Reddy	YSR Congress Party	Mekapati Vikram Reddy	YSR Congress Party
