= Manair River =

Manair River Maner River, Maneru River
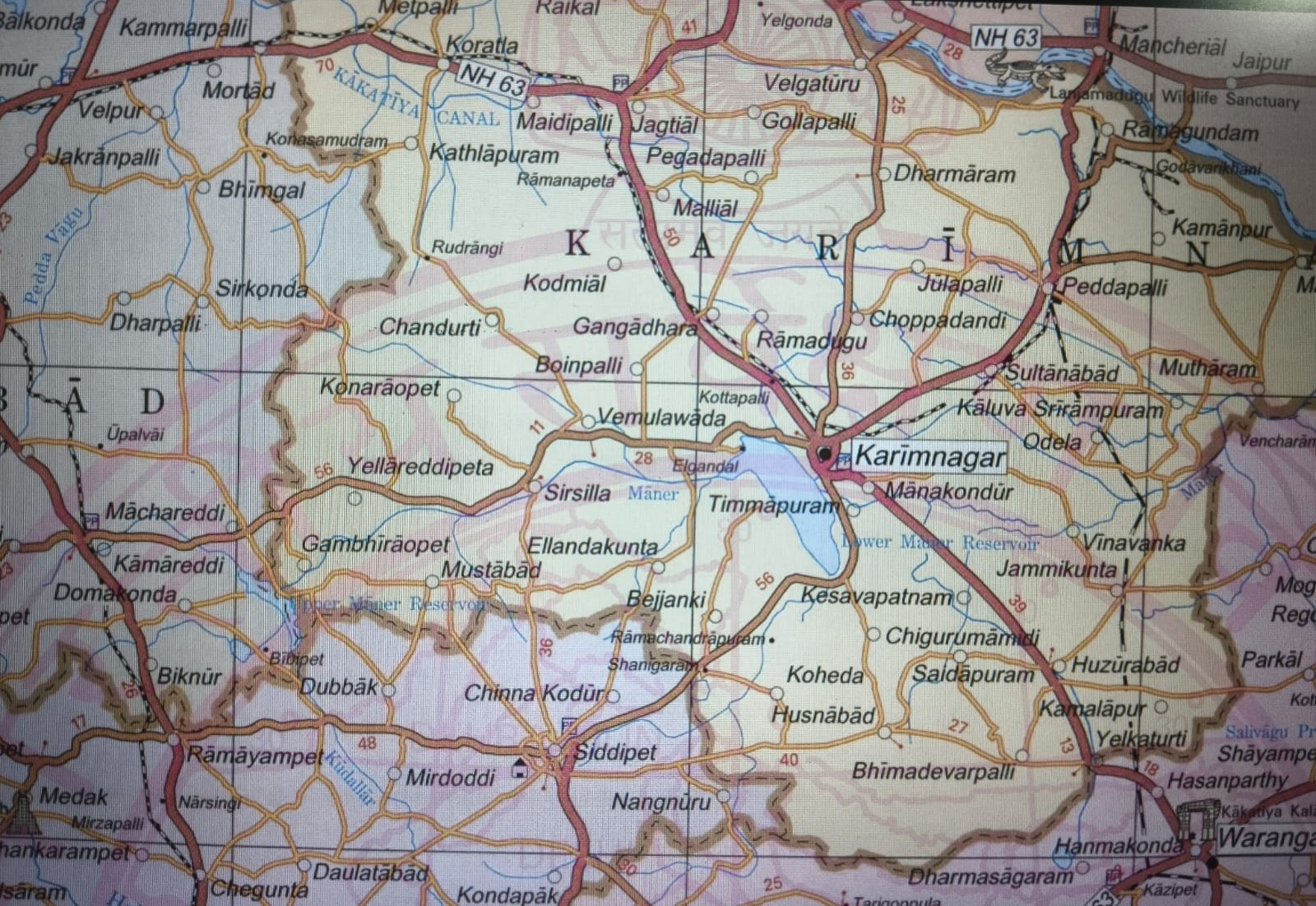
- Locator map of the Manair River in Telangana, India. The map illustrates the river’s course from its origin in the Sircilla hills (Rajanna Sircilla district), through Karimnagar district, and into Jayashankar Bhupalpally district, where it joins the Godavari River. Major reservoirs including Upper Manair Dam, Mid Manair Dam, and Lower Manair Dam are also marked.

Location
- Country: India
- State: Telangana

Physical characteristics
- Source: Sircilla hills, Rajanna Sircilla district
- Mouth: Godavari River
  - location: Narmala village, Mahadevapur taluk, Jayashankar Bhupalpally district
  - coordinates: 18°42′13″N 79°48′49″E
- Length: 128–161 km
- Basin size: 6,464 km²

The Manair River (also spelled Maner or Maneru) is a river in the Indian state of Telangana and a right-bank tributary of the Godavari River. It flows through the districts of Rajanna Sircilla, Karimnagar district, and Jayashankar Bhupalpally district, supporting irrigation, drinking water supply, and several major dams.

== Origin and course ==
The Manair originates in the Sircilla hills of Rajanna Sircilla district. From its source, it flows southeast through Rajanna Sircilla and Karimnagar districts, and then east into Jayashankar Bhupalpally district. The river ultimately joins the Godavari River near Narmala village in Mahadevapur taluk, Jayashankar Bhupalpally district. Along its course, it passes towns such as Sircilla and Karimnagar.

The total length of the river is estimated at 128 to 161 km, draining a catchment area of about 6,464 km².

== Tributaries ==
The Manair River is fed by numerous tributaries and seasonal streams (*vagus*), including:

- Salivagu River
- Mohedamada River (joins near Lower Manair Dam)
- Sali Vagu / Chali Vaagu
- Podaru Vagu
- Pedda Bodaru Vagu
- Pedda Vagu
- Chinna Vagu
- Kanthatmakur Vagu
- Hussein Miyan Vagu
- Nakkala Vagu
- Kesavapatnam Vagu
- Mothe Vagu
- Alipuram Vagu
- Mathula Vagu
- Mula Vagu (joined by Nalla Vagu and Nakka Vagu)

== Major reservoirs and dams ==
- Upper Manair Dam — located at Narmala village, Gambhiraopet mandal, Rajanna Sircilla district. Built during the Nizam period, it impounds the upper reaches of the river and has a capacity of about 2.20 TMC ft.
- Mid Manair Dam (MMD) — located at Manwada village, Boinpalli mandal, Rajanna Sircilla district. It has a capacity of ~25.87 TMC and was completed in 2018. During construction, part of its earthen embankment was breached in September 2016 during floods.
- Lower Manair Dam (LMD) — located at Alugunur village, Thimmapur mandal, Karimnagar district. Constructed between 1974 and 1985, it has a height of 41 m, length ~10.7 km, and gross storage capacity ~24 TMC ft. It serves as a balancing reservoir for the Sriram Sagar Project, irrigates ~163,000 hectares, and supplies drinking water to Karimnagar and nearby towns.

The Manair system provides irrigation, stabilizes ayacut under the Sriram Sagar Project, and supplies drinking water to Karimnagar. Through link canals, its reservoirs also receive and regulate water from major lift irrigation projects such as Kaleshwaram. A prominent recent landmark is the Karimnagar Cable Bridge, inaugurated on 21 June 2023, which spans the Manair near Karimnagar. It has become a tourist attraction and improved connectivity in the region.

A Chalukyan-era Trikutalayam temple was discovered on the banks of the Manair River at Tangellapally village in Sircilla mandal, Rajanna Sircilla district. The temple dates to the 10th–11th centuries and contains sculptures including Gajalakshmi, a Shiva Linga, and an idol of Lord Keshava among others.

The river has been subject to periodic floods, particularly in the midstream areas. The 2016 breach at Mid Manair Dam inundated several villages and highlighted dam safety and resettlement issues. Siltation, sand mining, and sewage inflows near urban centers have also been reported as concerns. The Lower Manair Dam is a popular recreation spot. It has boating facilities, parks (e.g. Ujwala Park, Deer Park) and attracts visitors especially during monsoon when floodgates release water.

== See also ==
- Godavari River
- Sriram Sagar Project
- Kaleshwaram Lift Irrigation Project
- Upper Manair Dam
- Mid Manair Dam
- Lower Manair Dam
- Karimnagar Cable Bridge
