= Thangallapally =

Thangallapally తంగళ్లపల్లి
- Village & Mandal Headquarters
- Location in Telangana, India
- Coordinates: 18°22′08″N 78°49′02″E
- Country: India
- State: Telangana
- District: Rajanna Sircilla
- Mandal: Thangallapally
- Headquarters: Thangallapally

Government
  - Type: Gram Panchayat
  - Sarpanch: Pamu. Naga
- Elevation: 361 m (1,184 ft)

Population (2011)
  - Total: 7,688

Languages
  - Official: Telugu, Urdu
- PIN: 505405
- Telephone code: 08723
- Vehicle registration: TS
- Number of Villages: 30 (in the Mandal)
- Website: rajannasircilla.telangana.gov.in

Thangallapally is the Mandal of Rajanna Sircilla district in Telangana, India. It is located on the banks of Maner River, a tributary of the Godavari river. This Maner River separates it from its District Headquarters of Sircilla. Thangallaplly is situated 133 km north of Hyderabad, the capital city of Telangana.

It was announced in 2026 that in Thangallapally would be built a new Tahsildar office.
