= Maner River =

River in India

Location
- Country: India
- State: Telangana
- Districts: Rajanna Sircilla, Karimnagar, Jayashankar Bhupalpally

Physical characteristics
- Source: Sircilla hills / Swarna hills
  - location: Rajanna Sircilla district, Telangana
- Mouth: Godavari River
  - location: Jayashankar Bhupalpally district, Telangana
- Length: 162 km

Basin features
- Progression: Godavari River → Bay of Bengal
- Tributaries
  - left: Salivagu river
- Major Dams: Upper Manair Dam; Mid Manair Dam; Lower Manair Dam

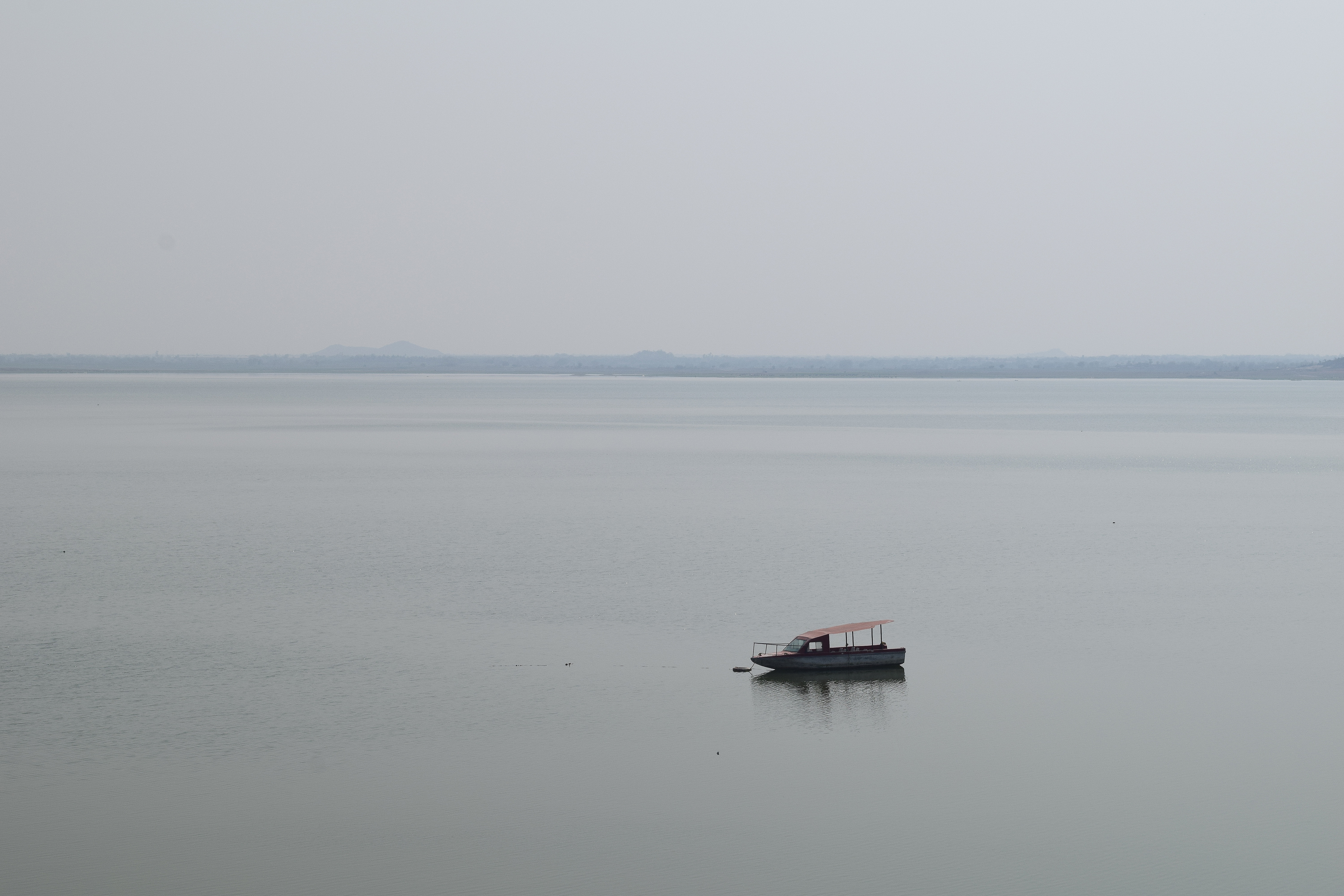
Manair Reservoir

The Maner river or Manair or Maneru (Marathi: मानेर, Telugu: మానేరు) is a tributary to the Godavari River in India. It is in turn fed by the Salivagu river. This river provides drinking water to Karimnagar, Telangana and also to the NTPC power plant at Ramagundam.

Three major projects built on Maneru River are:

1. Lower Manair Dam was constructed at Karinmnagar city of Karimnagar district
2. Mid Manair Dam was constructed at Manwada village Village in Boinpalli Mandal of Rajanna Sircilla district.
3. Upper Manair Dam was constructed at Narmala village in Gambhiraopet mandal of Rajanna Sircilla district.
