= Aravelly Avanish Rao =

Indian cricketer (born 2005)

Avanish
Personal information
- Full name: Aravelly Avanish Rao
- Born: 2 June 2005 (age 21); Mustabad Mandal Potgal, Rajanna Sirsilla, Telangana, India
- Batting: Left-handed
- Role: Wicket-keeper-batter

Domestic team information
- Years: Team
- Hyderabad
- 2024: Chennai Super Kings
- Source: News18

Aravelly Avanish Rao (born 2 June 2005) is an Indian cricketer who plays for Chennai Super Kings in the Indian Premier League. Avanish represented the 2024 Under-19 Cricket World Cup as a member of the Indian U-19 cricket team.
