= T–Works =

Prototyping centre in India

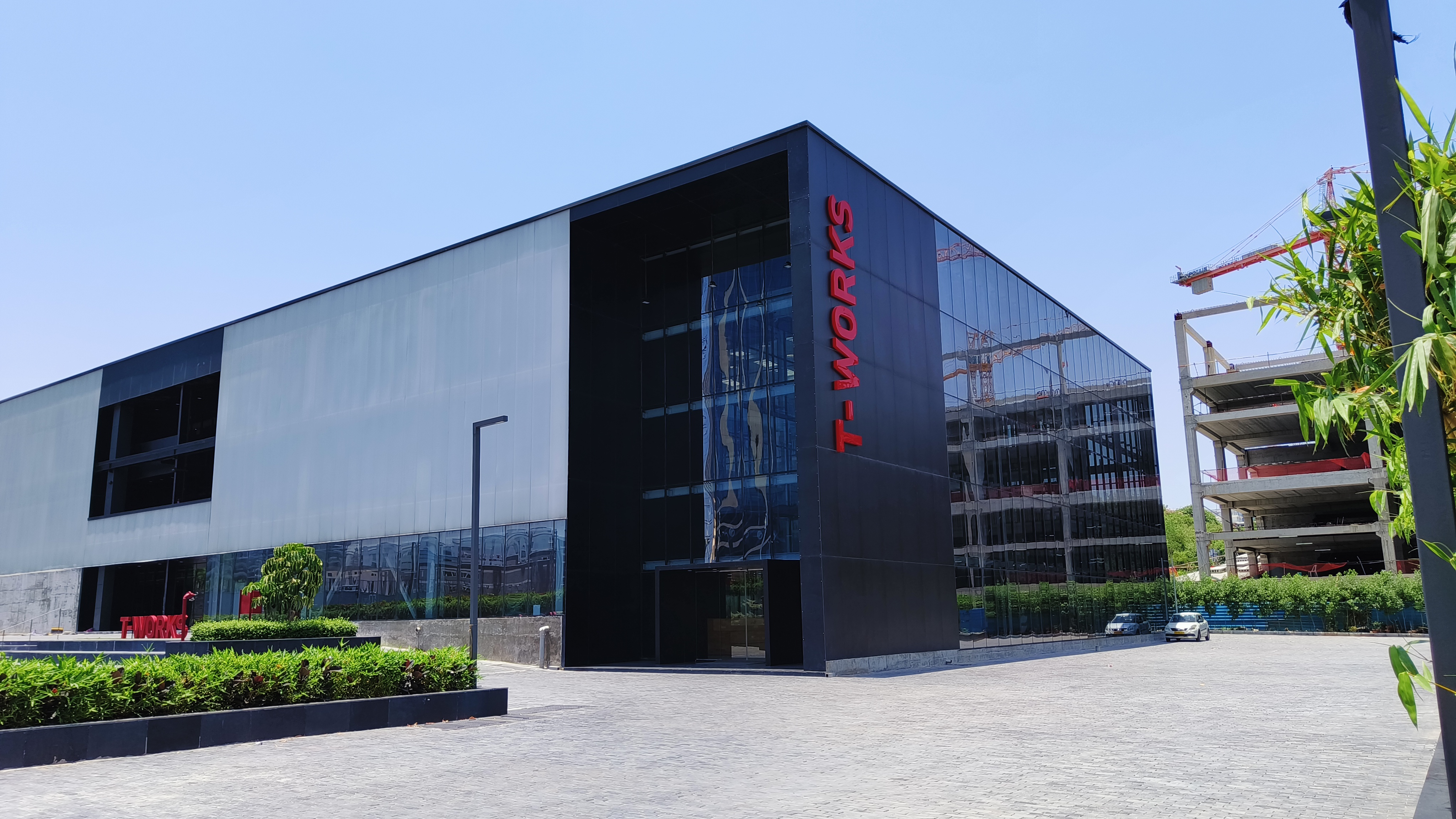
- India's largest prototyping centre
- Formation: 3 March 2023; 3 years ago
- Type: Public–private partnership
- Legal status: Active
- Purpose: Prototyping centre
- Headquarters: Raidurg, Hyderabad, Telangana, India
- Region served: Telangana
- Architect: Studio Chintala
- Key people: Anand Raj (CEO)
- Website: T–Works Website

T–Works is India's largest prototyping center. It is an initiative of the Government of Telangana, aimed to create and celebrate a culture of hobbyists, makers, and innovators in India, who explore and experiment without the fear of failure. T–Works Phase-1 is a 78,000 sq. ft. building, situated near T-Hub in Raidurg, Hyderabad, Telanagana. It has over 200 industry grade tools worth ₹ 115 million. T–Works Phase-2 will expand T-works to 250,000 sq. ft. over a 4.89-acre campus. To encourage innovators from smaller towns and rural areas, satellite centers of T–Works will also be set up in towns such as Warangal, Karimnagar, Khammam, Siddipet, Nizamabad, etc., where IT towers are being set up by the Government of Telangana.

== History ==
On 2 March 2023, Foxconn chairman Young Liu and Telangana industries & IT minister K. T. Rama Rao inaugurated T–Works via an innovative Kabuki drop (dramatic Japanese reveal style). Foxconn chairman also announced donation of a complete surface mount technology assembly line, which is used for assembling high-end electronics circuit boards, to T–Works.

== Facilities ==
- Metal Shop
- Advanced Rapid Prototyping
- 3D Printing Lab
- Electronics Lab
- Testing Lab
- Wood Shop
- Ceramic Studio
- Laser Cutting and Engraving

== See also ==
- List of business incubators
- National Institute of Design
