= Raidurg =

Neighbourhood in Hyderabad, India

Raidurgam
- Neighbourhood
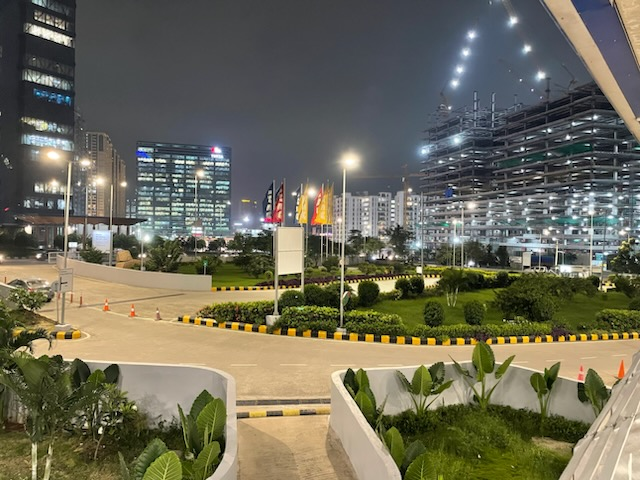
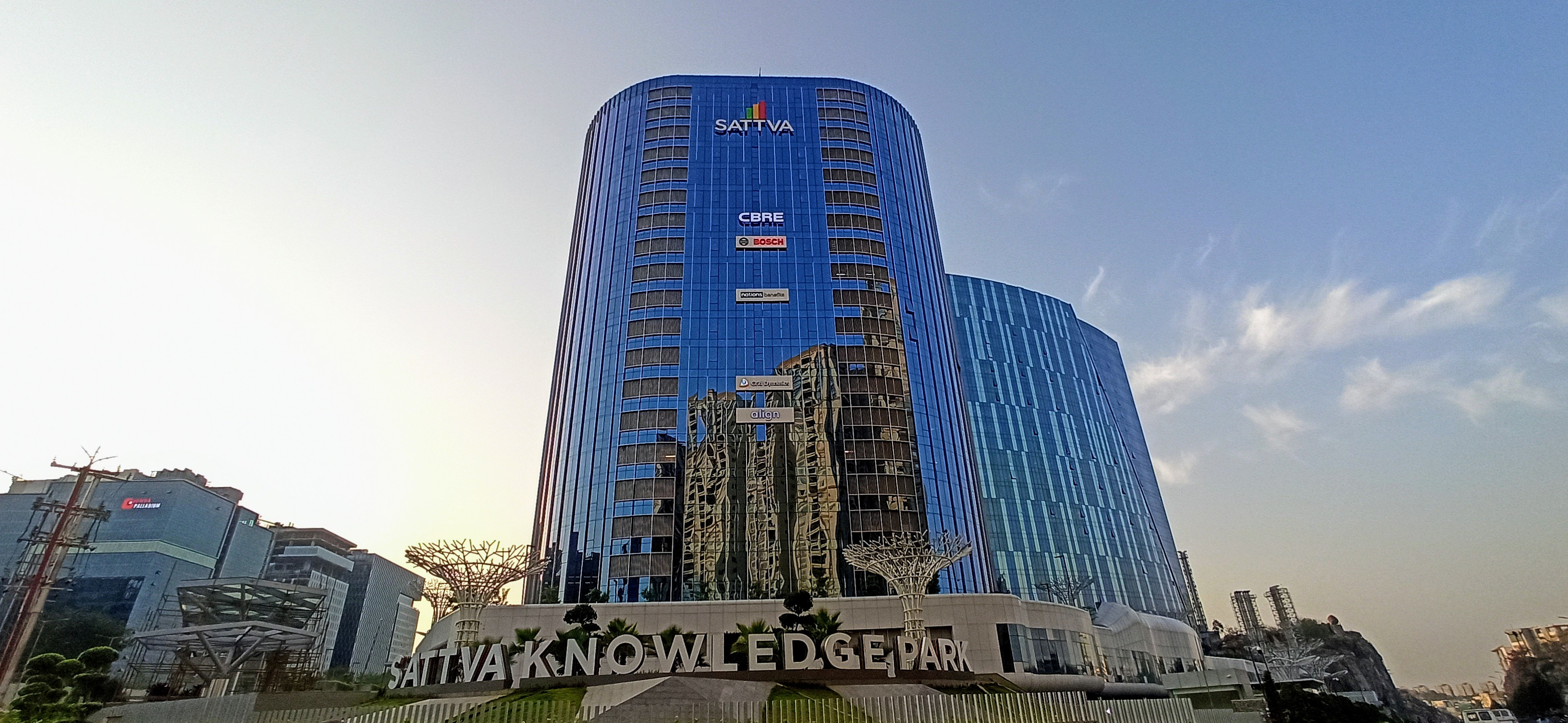
- From top: Raidurg view at night, Sattva Knowledge Park

- Location in Hyderabad, India
- Coordinates: 17°25′22″N 78°22′55″E
- Country: India
- State: Telangana
- District: Rangareddy
- Metro: Hyderabad

Government
  - Body: GHMC

Languages
  - Official: Telugu
- Time zone: UTC+5:30 (IST)
- PIN: 500062
- Lok Sabha constituency: Shamshabad
- Vidhan Sabha constituency: Jubilee Hills Assembly constituency
- Planning agency: HUDA
- Civic agency: GHMC

Raidurg or Raidurgam is a neighbourhood in Hyderabad, Telangana, India. It is close to HITEC City and is part of the HMDA. Salarpuria Sattva Knowledge City, T-Hub and T-Works are prominent buildings in its vicinity. In March 2023, Telangana High Court passed judgement that 84-acre (0.34 km^{2}) on survey number 46 of Raidurg village, Serilingampally mandal is state government land. Several of the tallest buildings in Hyderabad are located in Raidurg.

== History ==
Tools dating to the Neolithic period (6000 years old) have been discovered underneath the natural rock formation at BN Reddy Hills at Raidurg.

== Transport ==
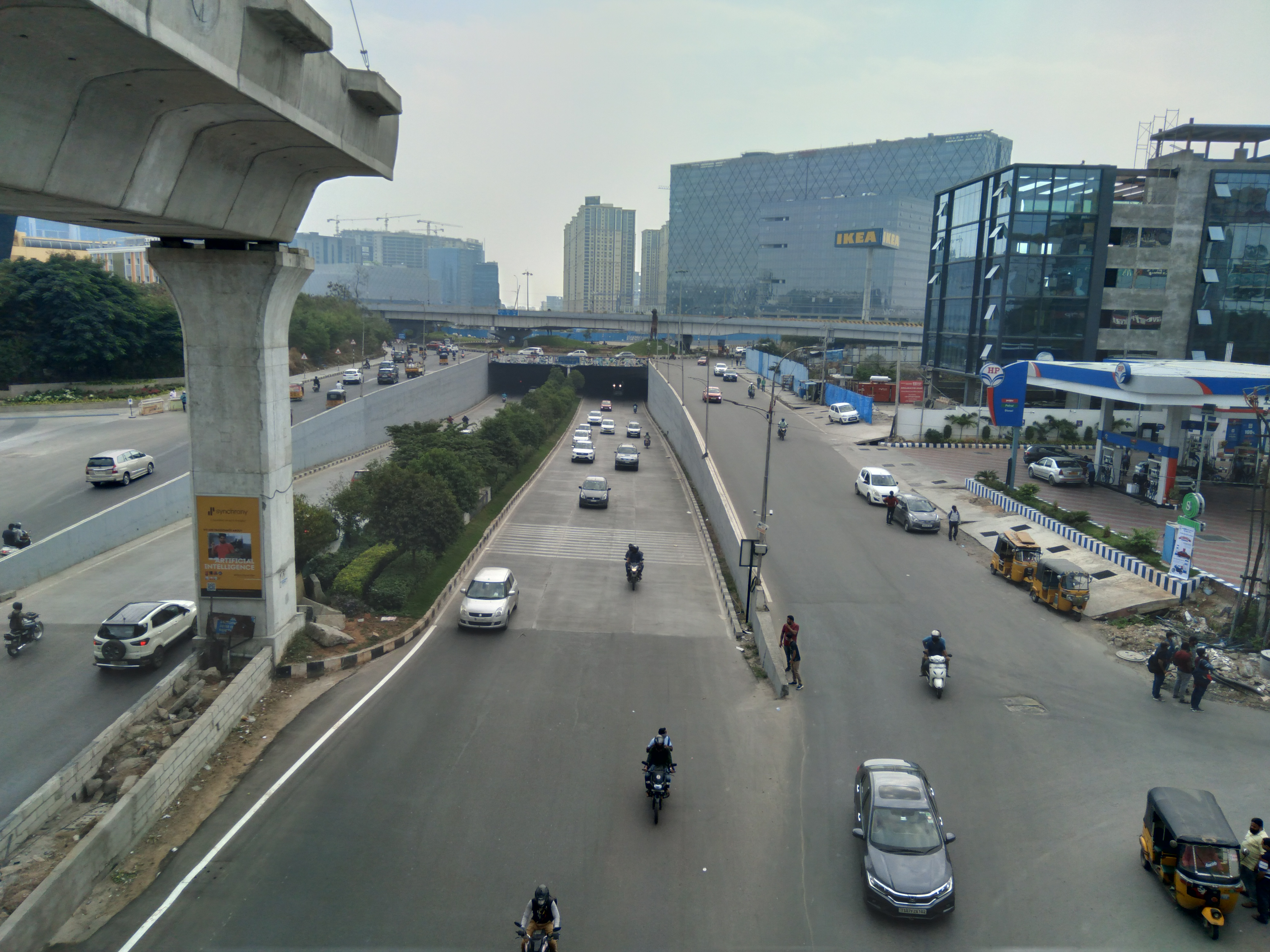
Mindspace underpass

It has good connectivity of buses by TSRTC. The suburb is part of the Hyderabad Metro rail line via the Raidurgam metro station.
