= Chandurthi =

Village in Telangana, India

Coordinates: 18°32′36″N 78°46′38″E

Chandurthi is a village and mandal headquarters located in the Rajanna Sircilla district of Telangana, India. It is home to several villages, including Ananthapalli, Bandapalle, Chandurthy, Jogapuram, Lingampeta, Mallial, Kattalingampet, Narsingapur, Marrigadda, Moodepalle, Sangula, Ramaraopally, Thimmapuram, Ashireddypally, and Yangal.
