= Boinpalle mandal =

Coordinates: 18°32′03″N 78°56′19″E

Boinpalle
- village
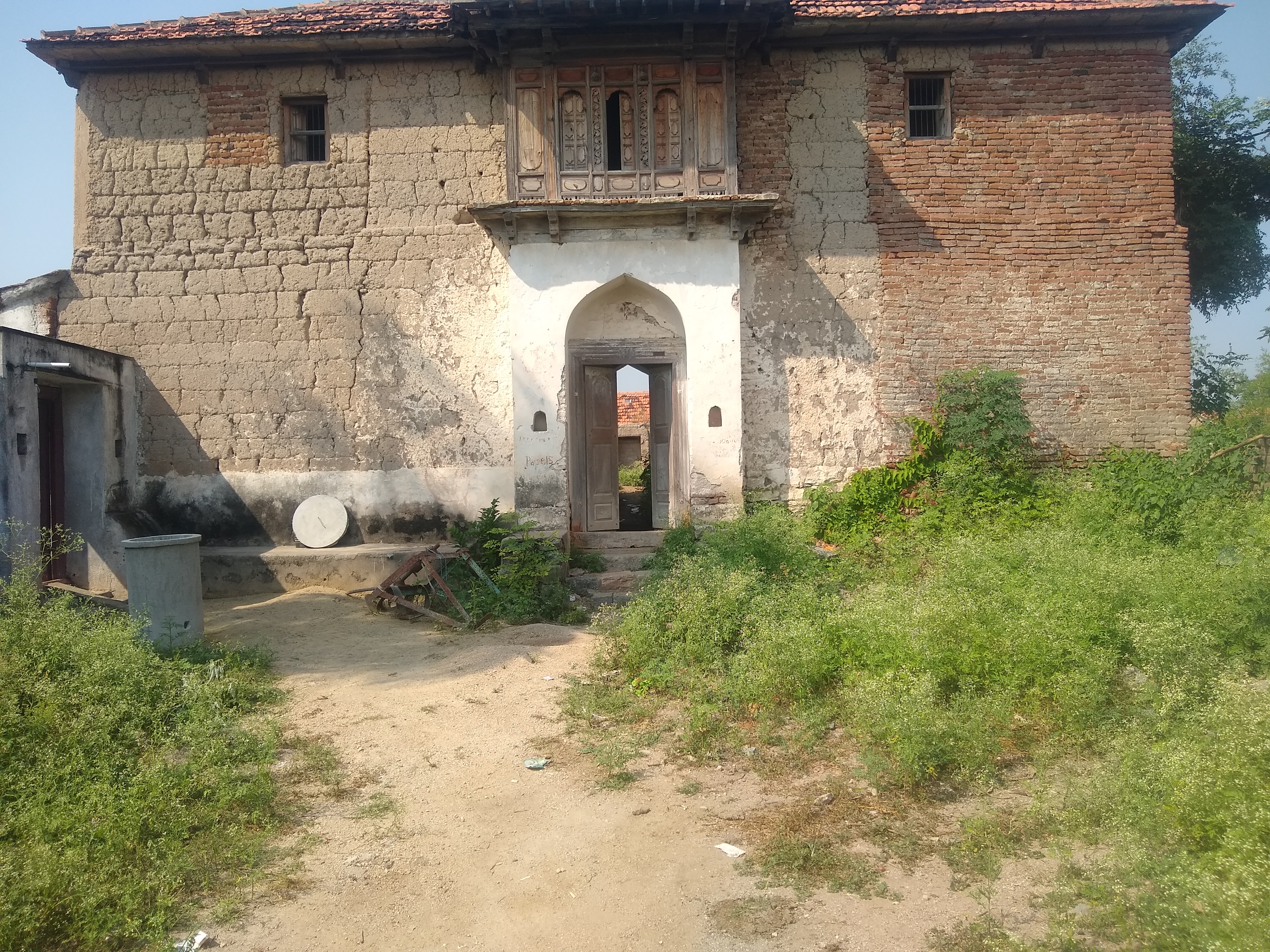
- Burugupalli Ghadi
- Interactive map of Boinpalle
- Country: India
- State: Telangana
- District: Rajanna Siricilla
- Talukas: Boinpalle

Languages
  - Official: Telugu
- Time zone: UTC+5:30 (IST)
- Postal code: 505524
- Vehicle registration: TS 23
- Website: telangana.gov.in

Boinpalle or Boinpalli is a mandal in Rajanna Sircilla district in the state of Telangana in India.

== Grama Panchayat villages ==
1. Ananthapally
2. Boinpalli
3. Burugupalli
4. Desaipalli
5. Dundrapally
6. Gundannapalli
7. Jaggaraopally
8. Kodurupaka
9. Korem
10. Kothapeta
11. Malkapoor
12. Manwada
13. Marlapet
14. Narsingapoor
15. Neelojipally
16. Ralla Ramannapeta
17. Ratnampet
18. Shabashpalli
19. Stambampalli
20. Thadagonda
21. Vardavelly
22. Venkatraopally
23. Vilasagar

== Places to Visit ==
Burugupalli Ghadi is located in Burugupalli Village of Boinpalle Mandal. Built in 1878 by Madireddy family (Madireddy Ram Reddy).
