= Lachapet =

- village
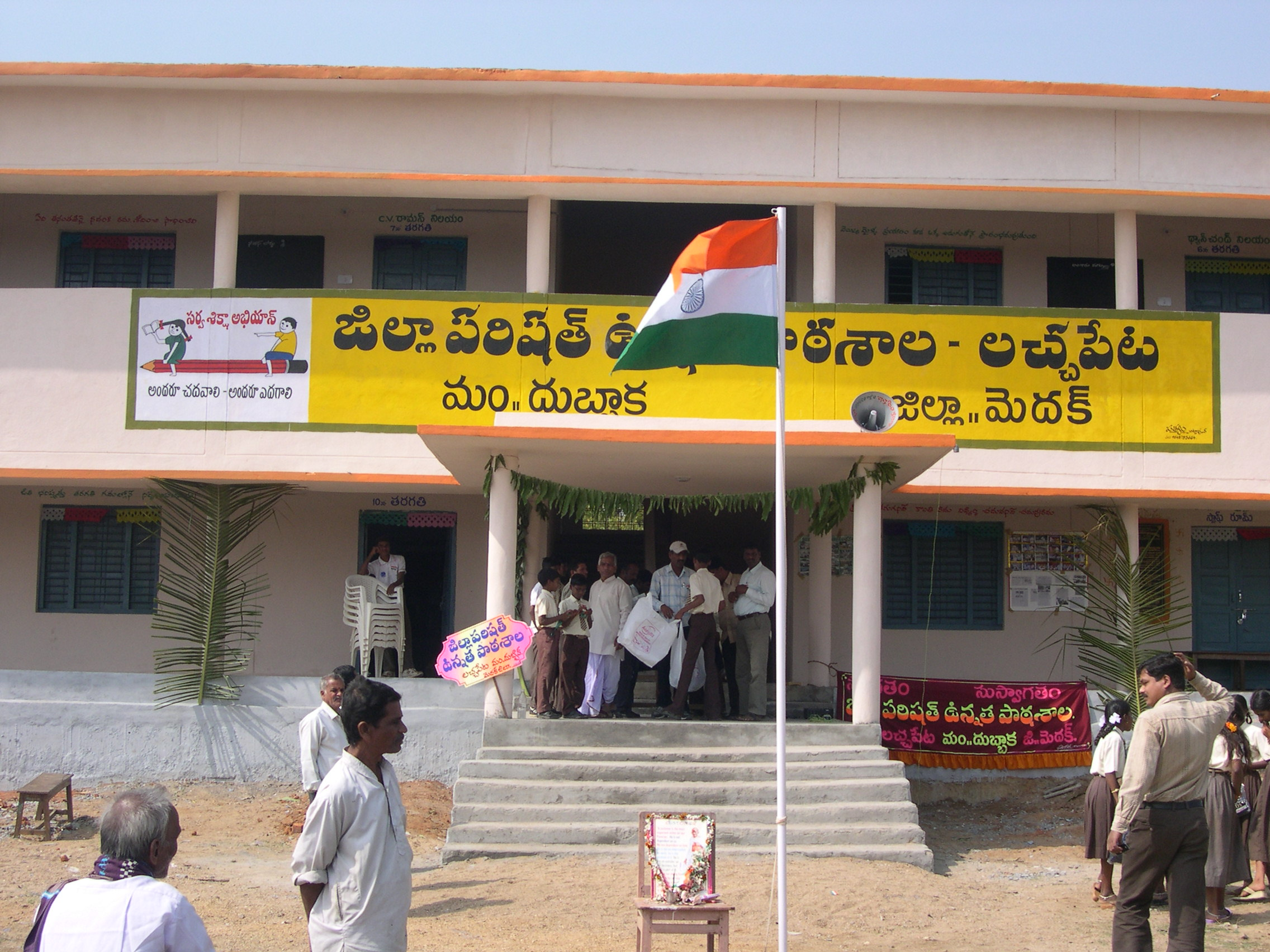

- Location in Telangana, India Lachapet (India)
- Coordinates: 18.19421°N 78.65003°E
- Country: India
- State: Telangana
- District: Medak

Languages
  - Official: Telugu
- Time zone: UTC+5:30 (IST)
- PIN: 502108
- Vehicle registration: TG

Lachapet is a village located in the Dubbak mandal, Medak district, Telangana. As of 2011 census, the population was around 5,000.
