= Obulapuram, D. Hirehal mandal =

Village in Andhra Pradesh, India

Obulapuram is a village in D Hirehal Mandal in Anantapur district, Andhra Pradesh, India. It has one iron ore mine.

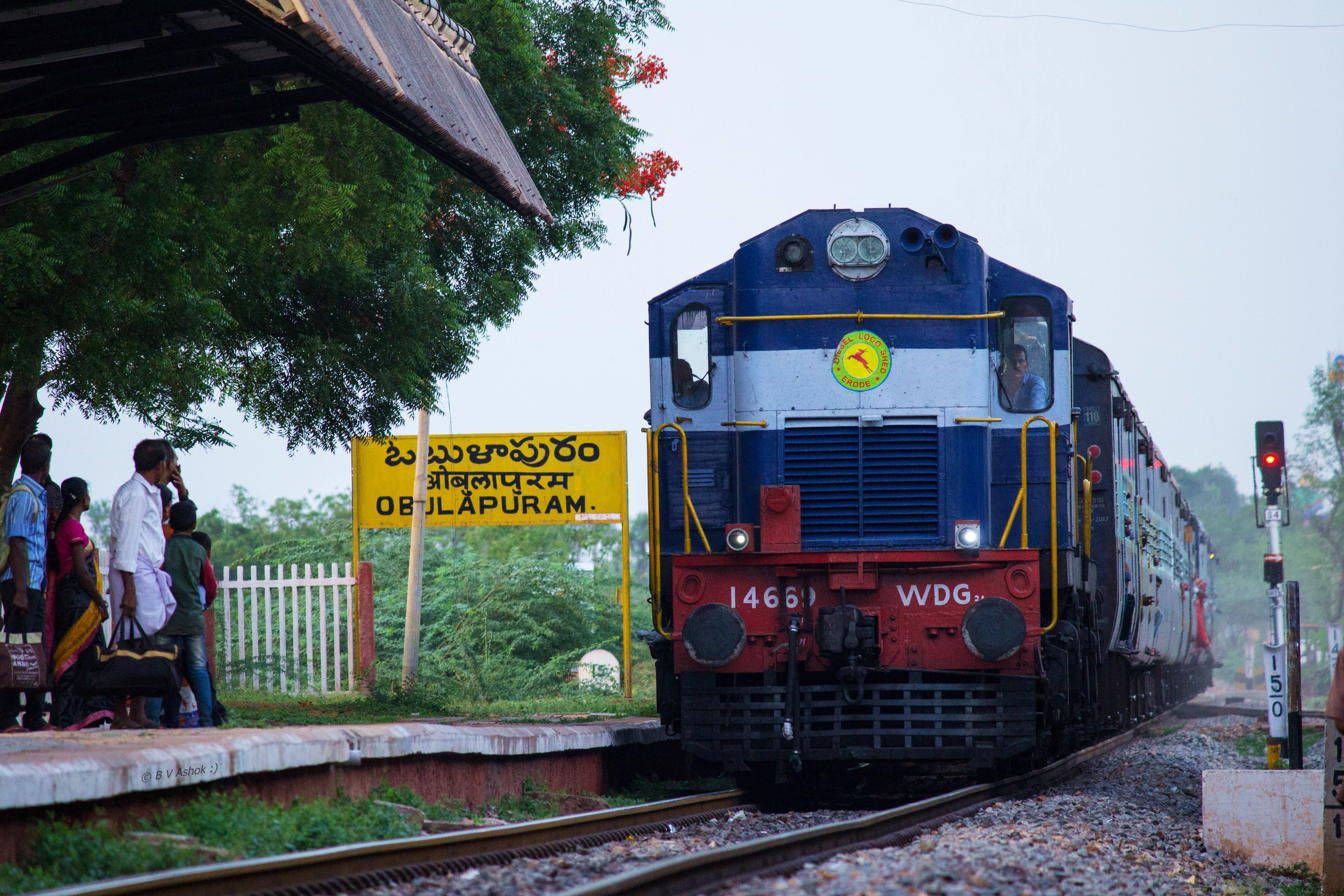
Obulapuram Railway Station
