= John B. Veihmeyer =

American businessman (born 1959)

- Born: 29 June 1959 (age 67); Washington, D.C.
- Education: University of Notre Dame - Mendoza College of Business
- Occupations: Past Global Chairman KPMG, and Chairman and CEO of KPMG in the U.S.
- Spouse: Elizabeth Ann Lichtenfels
- Children: Bridget, Patrick and Eileen Veihmeyer
- Parent(s): Edward Brady Veihmeyer and Margaret Catherine Easby-Smith

John B. Veihmeyer (born 29 June 1959) was global chairman of KPMG from April 2014 till September 2017. He previously served as chairman and chief executive officer of KPMG's U.S. firm for a five-year term from 10 June 2010 until 9 June 2015. William B Thomas, 49, has been elected Chairman of KPMG International. He will lead the KPMG global network of professional services firms for a 4-year term, effective 1 October 2017, succeeding John B Veihmeyer, 61, who is completing his term as Chairman and retiring from the firm, at the end of September 2017.

Veihmeyer previously served as a member of Chairman Christopher Cox's SEC Advisory Committee on Smaller Public Companies; Saint Mary's College Board of Trustees; Board Chairman of the Cultural Alliance of Greater Washington; Executive Committee of the Boards of the Federal City Council and Greater Washington Board of Trade.

Veihmeyer is a member of the Business Roundtable and the Mendoza College Business Advisory Council of the University of Notre Dame, from which he graduated.

== Education ==
Veihmeyer is based in New York City and has a BBA in Accounting from University of Notre Dame - Mendoza College of Business.

== Philanthropy ==
He is co-chair of CEOs Against Cancer and is a board member of the Committee Encouraging Corporate Philanthropy.

== Awards and recognition ==
Veihmeyer has been consistently named as one of the "Top 100 Most Influential People in Accounting" by Accounting Today magazine, and one of the Top 100 Most Influential People in Corporate Governance by Directorship Magazine. In 2013, Mr. Veihmeyer was honored as "Responsible CEO of the Year" by Corporate Responsibility Magazine. In 2011, he received the CEO Leadership Award from Diversity Best Practices for his commitment to diversity, and he has also been recognized for his work on KPMG's Family for Literacy (KFFL), a signature community outreach initiative dedicated to fighting childhood illiteracy.

== Association with KPMG ==
Career with KPMG:

Position	Year	Status
Global Chairman	2014-2017	-
U.S. Chairman, KPMG US	2010-2015	-
Chief Executive Officer, KPMG US	2008-2015	-
Chairman of Americas, KPMG US	2007-2014	-
Deputy Chairman, KPMG US	2005-2010	-
Washington Area Office Managing Partner, KPMG US	2003-2005	-
Partner-in-Charge of Audit in Washington and Baltimore, KPMG US	2002-2003	-
Lead SEC and professional practice partner Mid-Atlantic Area, KPMG US	1999-2001	-
Partner, KPMG US	1987	-
Employee, KPMG US	1977 (joined)	-

== Board Membership ==
Board membership:

Board Membership	Organisation
Global Chairman	KPMG International
Chairman and Chief Executive Officer	KPMG
Director	Partnership for New York City (PFNYC)
Director	Catalyst
Member of Governing Board	Center for Audit Quality (CAQ)
Board Member	Committee Encouraging Corporate Philanthropy
Member of International Advisory Board	British American Business Council
Board Member	US India Business Council
Member of Board of Trustees	United States Council for International Business
Member of Executive Committee	Business-Higher Education Forum (BHEF)
