= Ellanthakunta mandal =

Ellandakunta Illanthakunta
- Village
- Location in Telangana, India Ellandakunta (India)
- Coordinates: 18.307°N 78.954°E
- Country: India
- State: Telangana
- District: Rajanna Sircilla
- Talukas: Ellanthakunta

Languages
  - Official: Telugu
- Time zone: UTC+5:30 (IST)
- PIN: 505402/505528
- Telephone code: 08723
- ISO 3166 code: IN-TG
- Website: telangana.gov.in

Ellanthakunta is a mandal in Rajanna Sircilla district in the state of Telangana in India.
