= Yellareddipet =

Coordinates: 18°31′26″N 78°35′06″E

Srinagar Colony
- Village
- Interactive map of Srinagar Colony
- Country: India
- State: Telangana
- District: Rajanna Siricilla
- Talukas: Rajanna Sircilla

Languages
  - Official: Telugu
- Time zone: UTC+5:30 (IST)
- PIN: 505303
- STD code: 08723
- Vehicle registration: TS 02
- Website: telangana.gov.in

Yellareddipet is a village in Rajanna Siricilla district in the state of Telangana, India.
