= T–Hub =

Indian business incubator

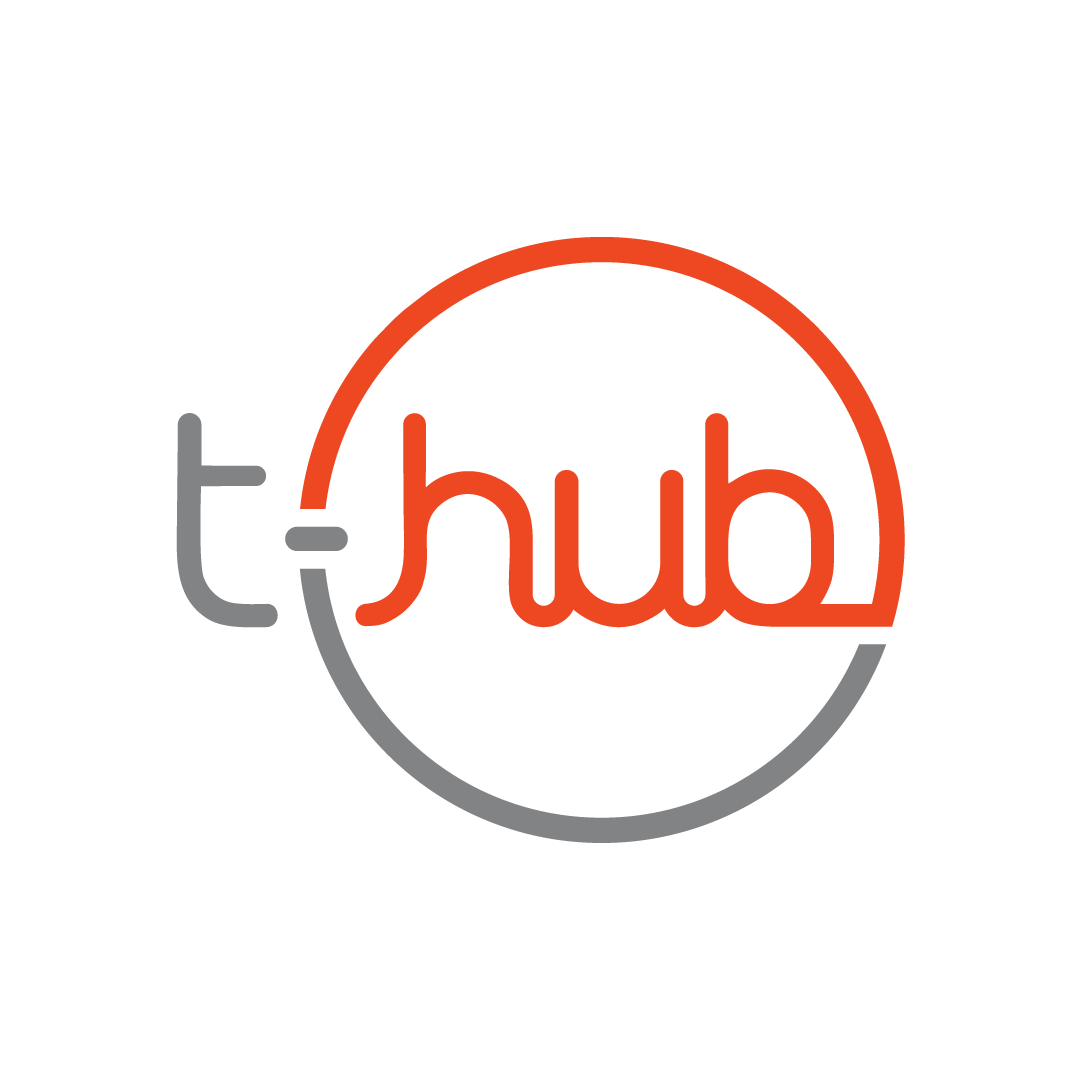
- Startup incubation and innovation hub in Hyderabad, India
- Formation: 5 November 2015; 10 years ago
- Type: Public–private partnership
- Legal status: Active
- Purpose: Business incubator
- Headquarters: Hyderabad, Telangana, India
- Region served: Telangana
- Key people: Kavikrut (CEO)
- Website: www.t-hub.co

T–Hub is a startup incubator and innovation hub headquartered in Hyderabad. Its campus spans more than 572,000 square feet. T–Hub supports startups and entrepreneurs through incubation and acceleration programs, mentorship, industry partnerships, market-access initiatives, and connections to funding opportunities. The organization works with startups, corporations, academic institutions, investors, and government agencies across India.

T–Hub also hosts several innovation initiatives and centers, including the AIC T–Hub Foundation, the Innovation for Defence Excellence (iDEX) hub, and the Machine Learning and Artificial Intelligence Technology Hub (MATH) Centre of Excellence, which is supported by the Department of Science and Technology. T–Hub also houses a Google for Startups Hub.

According to organisational reports, It has supported more than 3,300 startups through curated programs, market access, funding opportunities, mentorship, and infrastructure The organisation reports that startups associated with its ecosystem have collectively created more than 25,000 jobs and facilitated over US$2 billion in funding. T–Hub functions as an "incubator of incubators" and anchors the AIC T–Hub Foundation under NITI Aayog. It also hosts the Machine Learning and Artificial Intelligence Technology Hub (MATH), supported by the Department of Science and Technology.

T–Hub hosted the first Google for Startups Hub in the country. Inaugurated by Hon'ble CM Revanth Reddy, It is designed to provide startups with access to Google’s AI technologies, mentorship, cloud infrastructure, training programs, and global startup ecosystem support. The initiative aims to accelerate innovation across sectors such as AI, SaaS, deeptech, and digital transformation while enabling founders to scale globally. The organisation has stated that it aligns with Telangana government's startup and innovation initiatives, including long-term entrepreneurship ecosystem development goals. T–Hub operates across startup innovation, government innovation, corporate innovation, and academic innovation. It also runs programmes focused on startup mentorship, grant facilitation, investor access, corporate engagement, and international market access initiatives.

== History ==
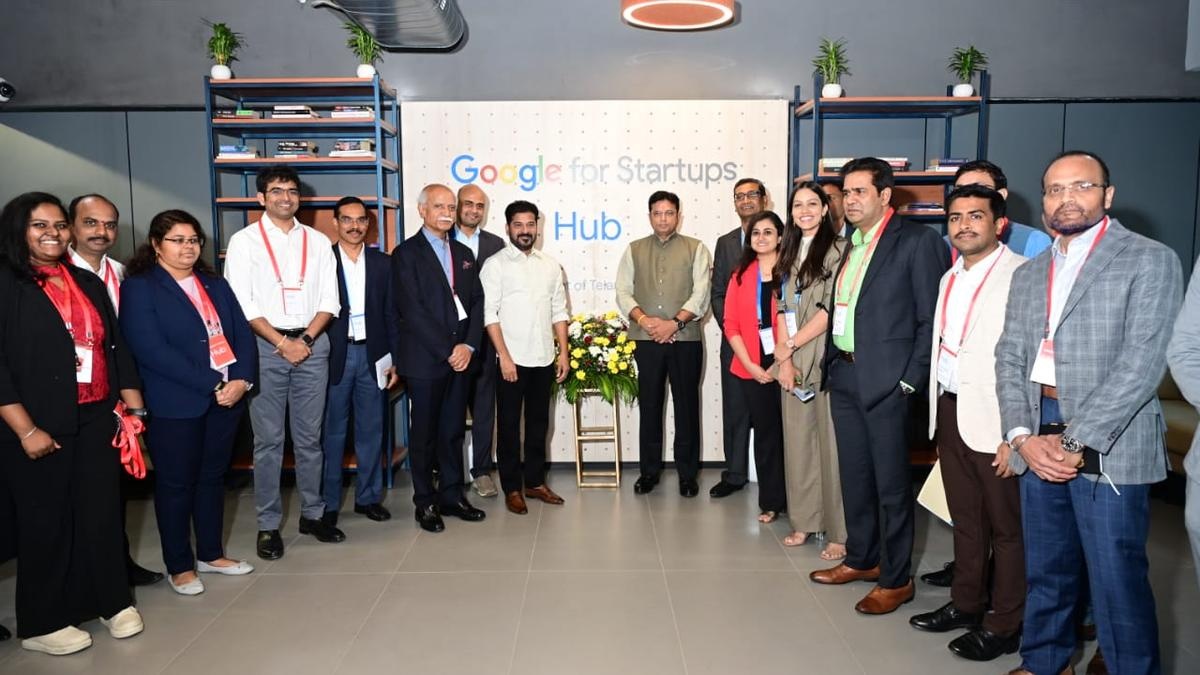
Telangana Chief Minister A. Revanth Reddy, IT Minister D. Sridhar Babu at the Google for Startups Hub in Hyderabad on December 10, 2025.

T–Hub was launched on 5 November 2015 by E. S. L. Narasimhan, Ratan Tata, and K. T. Rama Rao. At the time of its establishment, Hyderabad had relatively limited startup incubation infrastructure. T–Hub initially focused on creating co-working infrastructure and providing incubation support for startups. The organisation's revenue model includes memberships, corporate partnerships, and government support. The organisation later expanded into multidomain innovation programmes supporting startups, corporations, academic institutions, and government initiatives. It subsequently introduced structured incubation programmes, international market-access initiatives, sector-focused programmes, and corporate innovation collaborations. T–Hub 2.0 was inaugurated on 28 June 2022 by the then Chief Minister of Telangana, K. Chandrashekar Rao.

== Impact and ecosystem initiatives ==
T–Hub states that it has established programmes across startup innovation, corporate innovation, government innovation, and academic innovation. According to organisational reports, the organisation has supported more than 4,100 startups, facilitated more than US$2 billion in startup funding, and contributed to the creation of over 25,000 jobs. T–Hub also reports a founder network of more than 3,300 entrepreneurs and a mentor network comprising more than 337 mentors who have collectively delivered over 6,400 mentorship hours. The organisation operates funding-access and grant-support initiatives intended to assist startups with investor outreach, pilot opportunities, and access to public-sector innovation programmes. T–Hub has also supported incubation initiatives including Kickstart, AIC T–Hub Foundation, and MATH CoE, which focus on specialised sectors such as semiconductors, healthcare, mobility, sustainability, artificial intelligence, and defence technology. Several startups associated with T–Hub have appeared on Shark Tank India, including Portl, Jarsh Safety, Airth, and Sonic Lamb. T–Hub has additionally reported more than 180 corporate engagements and over 70 international delegation engagements through its global innovation and partnership initiatives.

T–Hub operates a Funding Desk that assists startups in identifying grant opportunities and connecting with potential investors. T–Hub serves as an anchor institution for WaveX, an initiative that aims to establish innovation hubs across India for startups working in the animation, visual effects, gaming, comics, and extended reality (AVGC-XR) sectors. According to official announcements, the initiative seeks to facilitate collaboration among startups, creators, investors, industry participants, and academic institutions through mentorship, networking, and market-access programs.

=== Achievements (2024–2026) ===
According to organisational reports and programme updates, T–Hub supported more than 1,750 startups between January 2024 and February 2026, including over 750 startups from Telangana. During this period, more than 108 startups were supported through AIC programmes, and over 56 pilot projects were executed across sectors including semiconductors and healthcare. The organisation reported that ₹3.3 crore was invested in 27 startups through T–Hub-managed funds, while more than 1,700 startup-investor introductions were facilitated with venture capital firms and investors. Organisational reports also stated that grants exceeding ₹85 crore were facilitated across deep technology, aerospace, and defence sectors, and that Lab2Market programme alumni collectively raised more than ₹36 crore.

T–Hub further reported facilitating more than ₹4,770 crore in startup credits through partnerships with technology companies and ecosystem partners. According to programme updates, more than 332 corporate connections and 30 pilot engagements were facilitated, while 52 startups reported average revenue growth exceeding hundred percent. T–Hub was referenced in a 2025 World Economic Forum report on innovation ecosystems as part of a case study on startup ecosystem development models. AIC T–Hub's semiconductor programme "ChipIn" received recognition at Startup Mahakumbh 2025 under the "Best Conceived Cohort" category. 1,748 startup–investor introductions made to 89 VCs. Mentorship & Talent Development: 6,420+ mentor hours delivered via a 337-member mentor network. T–Hub's total community size: 3,309 founders. Grade A Incubator accreditation (AIC T–Hub).

== Flagship programmes ==
Past Programs

=== Lab32 ===
Lab32 is a market-readiness programme supporting early-stage startups.

=== T-Angel ===
T-Angel is a programme designed to prepare startups for investment readiness.

Present Programs

=== T-Bridge ===
T-Bridge is an internationalisation programme connecting Indian startups with global markets.

=== AIC T-Hub Foundation ===
AIC T–Hub Foundation is an Atal Incubation Centre established under the Atal Innovation Mission of NITI Aayog. It focuses on sectors including healthcare, mobility, semiconductors, sustainability, and space technology. AIC T–Hub Foundation has built meaningful innovation outcomes across the ecosystem, with 205+ startups incubated, 162+ startups graduated, and 54+ products commercialized. The platform has helped startups raise 69+ crore in investment, secure 40.29+ crore in grants, deliver 97+ pilots, and build 141+ patents/IP, while also enabling a 6.65+ crore increase in MRR across supported ventures. According to organizational sources, AIC T–Hub is one of the largest Atal Incubation Centres in the Atal Innovation Mission network. The centre supports startups through incubation programs and initiatives such as BIML and Lab2Market, which focus on incubation management and the commercialization of research-based innovations.

=== MATH ===
MATH is India's largest AI/ML Centre of Excellence, developed in partnership with the Department of Science and Technology (DST). The hub targets supporting 150 AI startups annually and creating 500+ jobs in the AI ecosystem. MATH Nuage Program offers startups a virtual platform for incubation, providing comprehensive support to budding entrepreneurs in machine learning and artificial intelligence. The program aims to empower startups with the resources and guidance they need to thrive in a competitive landscape.

=== Google for Startups Hub ===
Google for Startups launched its first state-integrated facility in India at T–Hub, in collaboration with the Telangana Government. The initiative will enable access to global expertise, specialised training, and structured support for founders scaling across markets.

=== iDEX ===
T–Hub supports the iDEX initiative of the Government of India, which focuses on defence and aerospace innovation. According to programme updates, iDEX initiatives hosted at T–Hub have included startup challenges, grants, defence pilot projects, and procurement support for startups working in defence technologies. According to program reports, 73 iDEX challenges had been conducted as of FY 2025, including 30 challenges executed during FY 2025. The program reported the disbursement of more than ₹42 crore in grants and over ₹255 crore in commercial defence orders. In addition, 11 iDEX-supported startups completed proof-of-concept (PoC) projects with a reported combined value of approximately ₹9.29 crore.

== Partnerships ==
WaveX Collaboration T–Hub signed an MoU with WaveX, a startup accelerator under the Ministry of Information & Broadcasting, to bolster India's media-tech startup ecosystem. This partnership focuses on establishing up to 10 innovation hubs nationwide, supporting startups in the AVGC-XR (Animation, Visual Effects, Gaming, Comics, and Extended Reality) sector.

Skolkovo Innovation Center, Russia T–Hub forged a significant partnership by signing an MoU with the Skolkovo Innovation Center in Moscow. This alliance is designed to support tech startups and drive research collaborations between India and Russia, fostering cross-border innovation and technology exchange.

T–Hub and Algorand Foundation On July 30, 2025, T–Hub signed an MoU with the Algorand Foundation to support Web3 startups. This partnership aims to provide resources and mentorship to startups leveraging blockchain technology.

T–Hub and KPMG India In August 2025, T–Hub and KPMG India signed an MoU to empower technology-driven startups with strategic support and expert guidance. This collaboration focuses on providing startups with access to KPMG's extensive network and resources.

T–Hub and Hauts-de-France Regional Council (France) The Regional Council of Hauts-de-France has entered into a strategic partnership with T–Hub, the world's largest home for startups, establishing a structured framework to strengthen startup-led economic cooperation between India and France. As a part of this partnership, both parties will facilitate reciprocal market entry through structured immersion programs, market access and registration support in new geographies, while enabling cross-border investment through investor introductions, syndication pathways, and co-investment opportunities across both ecosystems.

T–Hub and JETRO T–Hub, the world’s largest home for startups, has entered into a strategic partnership with the Japan External Trade Organisation (JETRO). Through this engagement, T–Hub will serve as a comprehensive access platform for Japanese startups, corporates, and investors seeking to enter and grow in India, while enabling Indian startups to pursue structured expansion pathways into Japan. This partnership’s launch was reinforced with students from Tongali Nagoya University and Shizuoka University having recently participated in an immersive learning experience at T–Hub, reflecting both the strength and depth of the ecosystem engagement.

== Leadership ==
Kavikrut became CEO of T–Hub in 2025. Former chief executive officers include:

- Srinivas Kollipara (2015–2019)
- Jay Krishnan (2015–2018)
- Ravi G Narayan (2018–2021)
- M. Srinivas Rao (2021–2024)

== Board of directors ==
- K. Rama Krishna Rao, IAS, Chief Secretary to Government of Telangana
- B. V. R. Mohan Reddy
- Madan Mohan Pillutla
- Srinivasa Raju Chintalapati
- Sashi Reddi
- Raman Kumar
- Srikrishna Deva Rao Pendyala
- Prof. Sandeep Shukla

== Advisory committee ==
- Ajit Rangnekar

== See also ==
- List of business incubators
- Atal Innovation Mission
- Startup India
- T-Works
- iDEX
