= K. T. Rama Rao =

Indian politician

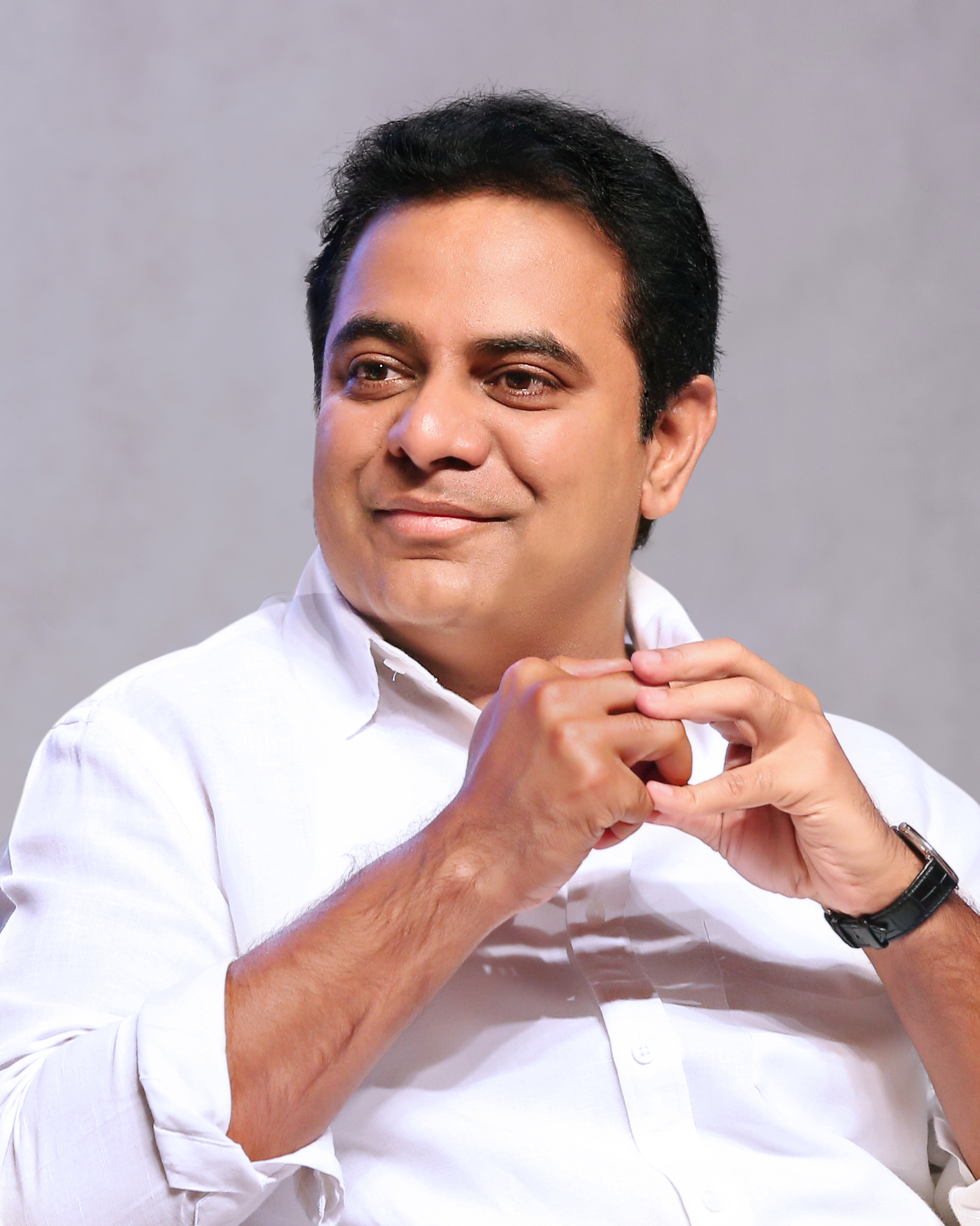
- KTR in 2015

Working President of Bharat Rashtra Samithi
- Incumbent
- Assumed office 17 December 2018
- President: K. Chandrasekhar Rao
- Preceded by: Office established

Minister for Industries Government of Telangana
- In office 8 September 2019 – 6 December 2023
- Governor: Tamilisai Soundararajan
- Chief Minister: K. Chandrashekar Rao
- Preceded by: K. Chandrashekar Rao (Chief Minister)
- Succeeded by: Duddilla Sridhar Babu

Minister for Municipal Administration & Urban Development Government of Telangana
- In office 7 February 2016 – 12 December 2018
- Governor: E. S. L. Narasimhan
- Chief Minister: K. Chandrashekar Rao
- Preceded by: Office established
- Succeeded by: K. Chandrashekar Rao (Chief Minister)
- In office 8 September 2019 – 6 December 2023
- Governor: Tamilisai Soundararajan
- Chief Minister: K. Chandrashekar Rao
- Preceded by: K. Chandrashekar Rao (Chief Minister)
- Succeeded by: Revanth Reddy (Chief Minister)

Minister for Information Technology Government of Telangana
- In office 2 June 2014 – 12 December 2018
- Governor: E. S. L. Narasimhan
- Chief Minister: K. Chandrashekar Rao
- Preceded by: Office established
- Succeeded by: Duddilla Sridhar Babu
- In office 8 September 2019 – 6 December 2023
- Governor: Tamilisai Soundararajan
- Chief Minister: K. Chandrashekar Rao
- Preceded by: K. Chandrashekar Rao (Chief Minister)
- Succeeded by: Duddilla Sridhar Babu

Minister for Panchayat Raj Government of Telangana
- In office 2 June 2014 – 12 December 2018
- Governor: E. S. L. Narasimhan
- Chief Minister: K. Chandrashekar Rao
- Preceded by: Office established
- Succeeded by: Errabelli Dayakar Rao

Member of Legislative Assembly, Telangana
- Incumbent
- Assumed office 2 June 2014
- Preceded by: Telangana Assembly Created
- Constituency: Sircilla Assembly constituency

Member of Legislative Assembly Andhra Pradesh
- In office 30 July 2010 – 28 April 2014
- Preceded by: Himself (Resigned for Telangana Statehood)
- Succeeded by: Telangana Assembly Created
- Constituency: Sircilla
- In office 3 June 2009 – 14 February 2010
- Preceded by: Chennamaneni Rajeshwara Rao
- Succeeded by: Himself (Resigned for Telangana Statehood)
- Constituency: Sircilla

Personal details
- Born: Kalvakuntla Taraka Rama Rao; 24 July 1976 (age 50) Karimnagar, Andhra Pradesh (present day Telangana), India
- Party: Bharat Rashtra Samithi
- Spouse: Shailima
- Children: 2
- Parents: K. Chandrashekar Rao (father); K. Shobha (mother)
- Relatives: K. Kavitha (sister); Joginapally Santosh Kumar (Cousin)
- Education: BSc (Osmania) in Hyderabad; MSc (Pune); MBA (Baruch College) in United States
- Alma mater: St. George's Grammar School, Abids Hyderabad, Andhra Pradesh present (Telangana); Vignan Junior College, Vadlamudi Guntur (Andhra Pradesh); Nizam College, Abids, Hyderabad, Andhra Pradesh present (Telangana); University of Pune, Pune (Maharashtra); Baruch College, New York City of United States

Kalvakuntla Taraka Rama Rao (born 24 July 1976), commonly known as KTR, is an Indian politician and Member of Legislative Assembly (MLA) of Telangana Legislative Assembly. He is a former Minister for Panchayat Raj, Municipal Administration and Urban Development, Industries and Information Technology and Communications of Telangana. He represents Sircilla assembly constituency in the Telangana Legislative Assembly, he is also the working president of the Bharat Rashtra Samithi.

He is the son of K. Chandrashekar Rao, former Chief Minister of Telangana and the founder of Bharat Rashtra Samithi (earlier Telangana Rashtra Samiti). He is also brother K. Kavitha. Rama Rao has been awarded Most Inspirational Icon of the Year 2015 by CNN-IBN and Ritz Magazine.

== Early life and education ==
K. T. Rama Rao was born in the Karimnagar district of Telangana (erstwhile Andhra Pradesh), India, on 24 July 1976. His father, K. Chandrashekhar Rao, founded the Telangana Rashtra Samithi political party and is the ex Chief Minister of Telangana. His mother K. Shobha, is a home maker. His younger sister, K. Kavitha, is a former Member of Parliament in the Lok Sabha for the Nizamabad constituency., Also many people commonly refer Rama Rao as KTR.

At the age of ten, he moved to Hyderabad and joined the Amravati Public School at Yousufguda before shifting to Nalanda Public School at Mehdipatnam. He completed his Schooling at St. George's Grammar School, Abids Road. Further, he pursued Intermediate from Vignan Junior College, Vadlamudi, Guntur district.

He earned BSc in Microbiology, Chemistry and Botany from Nizam College, a constituent College of Osmania University at Hyderabad. He holds two Post-Graduate degrees—MSc in Bio-Technology from University of Pune and Master of Business Administration in Marketing and E-Commerce from Zicklin School of Business at Baruch College, a constituent college of the City University of New York.

During 1998–99, Rama Rao began his stint as an IT professional and interned at the shipping and ocean logistics firm INTTRA Inc on Madison Avenue, New York, United States.

From 2001–2006, KTR quit his job and returned to India to support his father's struggle for a separate Telangana state.

== Personal life ==
Kalvakuntla Taraka Rama Rao is married to Shailima. The couple has two children – son Himanshu and daughter Alekhya.

== Political career ==
KTR began his political career in 2009 when he contested the Andhra Pradesh Legislative Assembly Elections from the Sircilla Assembly constituency. He won by a close margin of 171 votes, defeating independent candidate K. K. Mahender Reddy.

Soon after, KTR and 10 other members from the TRS resigned from the Legislative Assembly in support of a separate State for Telangana. In July 2010, the High Court of Andhra Pradesh ordered the Election Commission of India to conduct by-polls in Sircilla and Vemulawada among other towns across the Telangana region. Rao contested again from Sircilla and again defeated K. K. Mahender Reddy (now with the Indian National Congress (INC)), this time with a margin of 68,219 votes.

He held Rail Roko agitation after police and paramilitary forces were deployed by the Kiran Kumar Reddy government to control the ongoing situation. On 27 January 2013, Rao courted arrest when he attempted to participate in the 'Samara Deeksha' (protest) at Indira Park in Hyderabad.

KTR demanded that a Bill be introduced in Parliament in an interview to a National News Channel. He also declared that the impending "Telangana government will not compromise on any aspect of administration being delegated to the union government with regard to (the city of) Hyderabad."

In the first Legislative Assembly elections for Telangana, as the 29th state of the Indian Union, Rao contested as the MLA candidate for TRS from Sircilla against Konduri Ravider Rao from the INC, winning the seat for the third consecutive time by a margin of 53,004 votes. TRS emerged as the ruling party with the single largest majority in the assembly, winning a decisive mandate of 66 out of 119 seats.

On 2 June 2014, KTR was sworn in as a Member of the Legislative Assembly (MLA) for Telangana, and Cabinet Minister for Information Technology and Panchayat Raj.

He was appointed Executive Working President of the Telangana Rashtra Samithi Party (TRS) by the President and Chief Minister Kalvakuntla Chandrashekhar Rao.

He won the same seat in the 2018 Telangana Legislative Assembly election against Kondam Karuna Mahender Reddy.

In the 2023 Telangana Legislative Assembly election, Rao officially submitted his nominations at the RDO office located in Sircilla. He won the seat for the fifth consecutive time, by a margin of 29,845 votes against K. K. Mahender Reddy once again. However, his party lost the election and became the opposition party after a defeat to the Indian National Congress.

In August 2024, he and other BRS MLAs were evicted from the Telangana Legislative Assembly by marshals. This was in response to them protesting against Chief Minister Revanth Reddy's disrespectful remarks against women legislators. They were released later at the Telangana Bhavan, the headquarters of their party.

== Role as Minister ==
He served as a minister in various portfolios from 2014-2023.

=== Minister for Information Technology ===
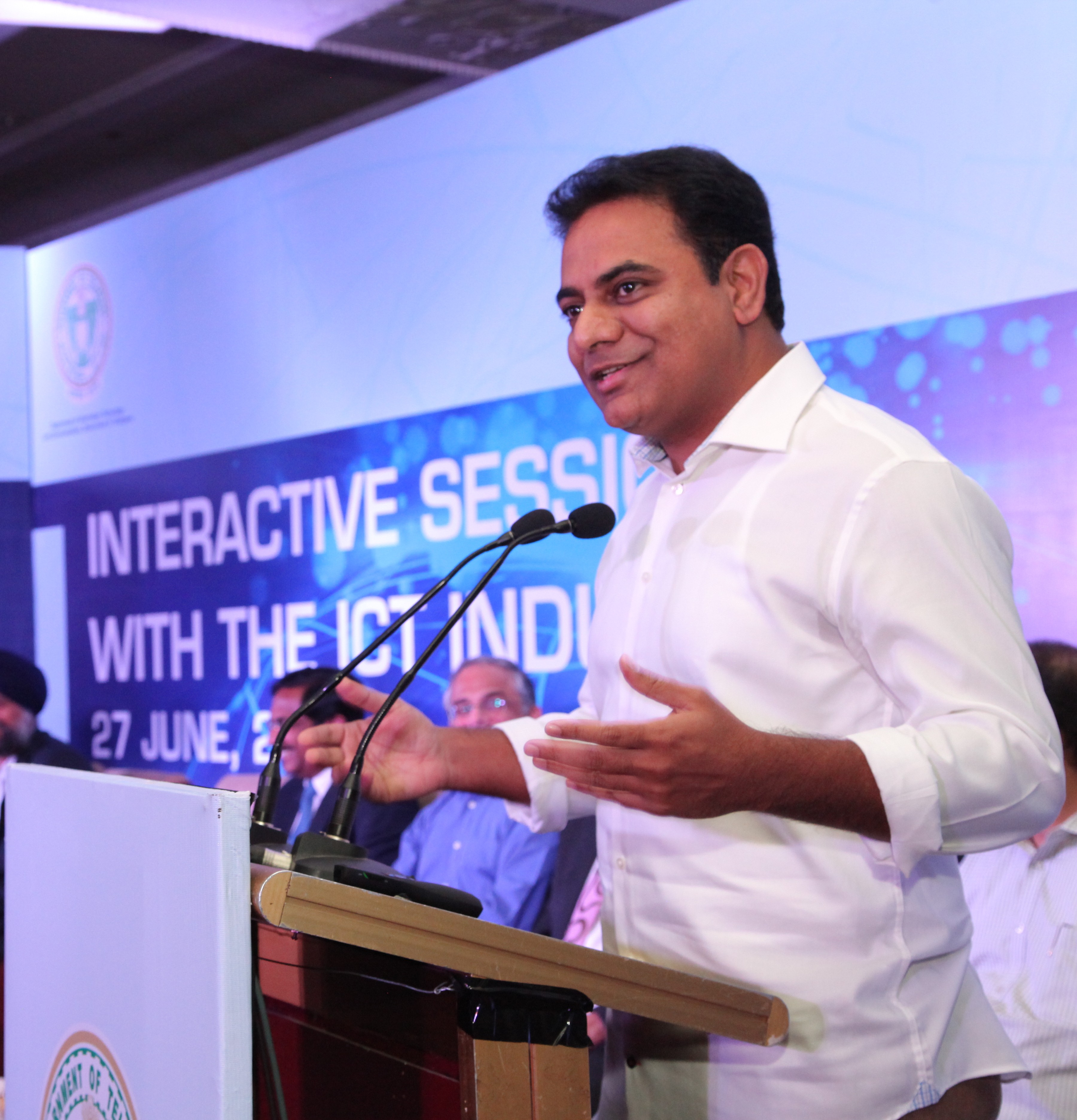
Rao at the Interactive Session with the ICT Industry event on 27 June 2014

Soon after assuming office, Information Technology (IT) Minister K. T. Rama Rao briefed the Chief Minister on large-scale projects for a progressive Hyderabad in a review meeting of the Information Technology and Investment Region (ITIR) Policy.

In December 2014, along with the Telangana State Industrial Infrastructure Corporation (TSIIC) Chairman, Rao held discussions with the CEO of Smart City in Dubai with regard to developing Hyderabad under the ambit of ITIR. Rao also called on Yusuff Ali M A, chairman of the Abu Dhabi-based Lulu Group who said that his company would invest Rs 2,500 crore in Telangana's FMCG domain for 2015–16. During the same time, Rama Rao visited the Sonapur camp in Dubai to interact with about 20,000 migrant workers from Telangana who resided there.

In May 2015, Rao led an IT department delegation on a two-week tour to the United States with the agenda of discussing and reaching partnerships with corporate giants on various areas of collaboration with the Government of Telangana. The top brass of 30 leading companies which include John Chambers of Cisco, Mark Hurd of Oracle and John Veihmeyer, the global chairman of KPMG, met Rao to discuss the new industrial policy and ease of doing business in Telangana. He met Microsoft CEO, Satya Nadella, and Amazon executives Monique Meche & John Schoettler who assured their continued support to the State's initiatives in the IT space. The Minister had also exhorted Non Resident Indians in a meeting at Seattle to be Goodwill Ambassadors in representation of the state government outside India.

He set up the largest start-up incubator, T-Hub on 5 November 2015. The platform located at Gachibowli is one of Rao's landmark initiatives for the state's young talent pool to innovate, incubate and incorporate new ideas for entrepreneurship. Up to 300 start-ups and provides a futuristic workspace for up to 800 people at once. Rao conceptualised the cell a step further than the norm by including public-private partnership and mentorship as core features of the facility.

Rao invited several industry leaders including Adobe Inc. CEO Shantanu Narayen, Biocon chairman Kiran Mazumdar Shaw and Infosys co-founder N R Narayana Murthy among others to mentor young entrepreneurs of the state. In December 2015, Infosys CEO Vishal Sikka met with Rao during his visit to T-Hub. Soon after, the company announced that it was going to expand its Pocharam campus to double the capacity to 25,000 employees as compared to 12,000 employees, making it Infosys' biggest campus. The Dalai Lama Centre for Ethics and Transformative Values at Massachusetts Institute of Technology (MIT) has decided to establish its South Asia centre in Hyderabad.

On 19 March 2016, Rao urged Union Information Technology Minister Ravi Shankar Prasad to sanction Rs 100 crore for the second phase of T-Hub. Mr. Prasad was also urged to sanction Rs 3,000 crore due to the State for implementation of IT Investment Region.

During a 2014 (CII) conference on cyber security, Rao had urged industry to collaborate with the government to combat cyber crimes. This, while emphasising a dedicated workforce to defeat the threat that hackers pose to the IT infrastructure. Towards a Swachh Digital Telangana, in July 2015, two important MoUs were signed in the presence of Rao. As a result, One MoU between the Government of Telangana and C.R. Rao Institute of Mathematics, Statistics and Computer Science to make cyber security part of the state's multi-policy framework. Another was signed between TASK and Samsung South-West Asia in offering courses on software development and testing operations. In August 2015, the state government partnered with NASSCOM and Data Security Council of India (DSCI) towards making Hyderabad a cyber-safe destination.

On 10 March 2016, Governor E S L Narasimhan stated in his address to the joint session of Assembly that, with Rao as the first IT Minister of the state, the IT sector recorded huge exports of Rs 68,258 crore through 1,300 IT units, including 500 global companies, which shows 16% growth. He has been invited to speak at international conferences on Telangana's growth such as the Bridge India Ideas for India Conference in May 2023. His speech at this conference attracted media attention on Telangana's growth as a pattern for the rest of India.

=== Minister for Panchayat Raj ===
On 19 January 2015, Rao announced that at least 26 government employees of various departments will be brought to work under the chairmanship of village sarpanches through a new Act that will strengthen village panchayats in Telangana. He also assured that his government will appoint special tribunals and ombudsmen for the purpose of accountability and grievance redressal. Rao stated that the government has plans to spend Rs. 642 crore in 150 most backward mandalstill the year 2020 for improving livelihood and human development index under the Telangana PallePragathiprogramme.

In June 2015, Rao urged Union Panchayat Raj Minister, Nihal Chand, to give priority to the new state and ensure that arrears of the 13th Finance Commission funds be released from the central pool with immediate effect. This, while appraising him of important programmes that include Our Village- Our Plan, Harithaharam and the much sought after construction of two bed room houses with basic amenities for the poor and weaker sections.

A Cabinet Sub-Committee chaired by Minister Rao had formulated guidelines for the implementation of "GramaJyothi", a flagship programme of the state government which was launched on 15 August 2015. The guidelines envisaged that the perspective plan should focus on provision of basic amenities for rural development. To meet them, Rao emphasised the allocation of funds to various works like provision of drinking water, health, education, electricity, sanitation and roads among others.

Rao also unveiled that the State Government was planning to increase the bank linkage to SHG women from the earlier Rs 5 lakh to Rs 10 lakh. He directed officials to construct Mahila Bhavans for SERP offices at the village level. In July 2014, Rao had expedited the clearance of dues to the tune of Rs 14.96 crore for women beneficiaries of the Bangaru Talli scheme.

During a review meeting of the Department of Panchayat Raj held on 18 September 2015, Rao announced that e-panchayat system would be rolled out across Telangana in the forthcoming months, the TRS government's flagship project in the e-governance space for a progressive state.

Towards women empowerment, he declared that about 10,000 women would be provided employment through the proposed comprehensive village service centers or PalleSamagraSevaKendram. These women, besides qualified youth, are trained and appointed as Village Level Entrepreneurs (VLEs) to operate, supervise and implement government schemes at the village level.

Interacting with a group of women at a VLE training programme held at the Telangana State Institute for Panchayat Raj and Rural Development (TSIPARD), Rao appreciated women from over 4 lakh self-help groups for successfully repaying Rs. 5,000 crore loans availed by thrift groups adhering to fiscal discipline.

Rao launched the Water Grid Scheme (Telangana Drinking Water Supply Project – Water Grid) in September 2015, with an estimated outlay of Rs. 35,000 crore. According to him, the State government is fully determined to complete the project, also known as Mission Bhagiratha, one that is expected to find a lasting solution to the drinking water needs of people in the State, much ahead of the stipulated time frame of three-and-a-half years. The government would also use hydraulic modelling software for determining the size of water pipelines, pumping capacity and height to which water would be pumped.

Wide spread success of the concept and implementation in the initial month impressed the Chief Minister of Uttar Pradesh, Akhilesh Yadav, who wished to replicate the model for the Bundelkhand Region. Rao and a team of IT department officials had flown to Lucknow in October 2015 to give a presentation in respect of the Water Grid Scheme, alongside inviting Yadav to visit Telangana for a ground-level assessment.

Earlier, Rao had also inaugurated the Rs. 10 crore Comprehensive Protected Drinking Water Supply (CPWS) Scheme at Puttakota in Raghunadhapalem mandal and a new rural water supply scheme at Edulapuram village in Khammam rural mandal.

On 27 January 2016, the Government of India, the Government of Telangana, and the World Bank signed a US$75 million credit agreement for the Telangana Rural Inclusive Growth Project. This was hailed as a significant boost to the rural development department on the ministerial watch of Rao that would enhance the agricultural incomes of small and marginal farmers in the state, and ensure increased access to services related to health, nutrition, sanitation and social entitlements.

Rao told the State Assembly in March 2016 that the state government would construct as many as 1,000 new Gram Panchayat buildings across the state in the first phase at a cost of Rs 130 crore. The new buildings will replace the dilapidated ones. The government has sanctioned Rs 13 lakh for each building. He also told the House that a total of 2.75 lakh LED bulbs would be fitted in 25 municipalities and nagar panchayats of Telangana government at a cost of Rs.10 per bulb as fitting charges.

=== Role in GHMC elections ===
Elections to the Greater Hyderabad Municipal Corporation (GHMC), the urban local government body of Hyderabad, were conducted in February 2016. Rao was made in-charge of the party's campaign for the election. He was entrusted with the complete responsibility of the party's campaign and publicity strategy since KCR was preoccupied with MLC polls. The odds were against the party in the city election since it had won only 2 out of 24 Assembly seats in previous GHMC elections.

The election has seen Rao actively touring all 150 wards of the city in a span of one week, conducting more than 100 public meetings while canvassing for TRS. Starting as early as 6 am every day, he worked round the clock to participate and engage with important leaders in the campaign sending a strong message to party cadre. He was seen to use his marketing skills and political experience to promote the party as a strong contender in the election.

Hyderabad is a bastion for urban-centric parties like the Bharatiya Janata Party and Telugu Desam Party (TDP) which draw their support from the large Seemandhra population and working class residing in the city. Proving the allegations that the ruling party was trying to conduct elections during the Sankranti vacation were wrong, Rao asserted that he believed in inclusive leadership and that the party would win with the votes of Seemandhra people, exuding confidence that the people of Andhra region would also vote for the TRS seeing the development works of the government.

His initiatives as the IT minister of the State won the confidence of both the people and industry leaders making his campaign a success. He also reached out to Bengalis, Jains, Sikhs, Muslims and "basti log". The induction of local basti leaders, announcement of the double-bedroom scheme, regularisation of house sites and uninterrupted water supply attracted people from the basti to vote for the party in large numbers.

As a result, TRS won in 99 out of the 150 wards in the city, virtually wiping out the BJP, Indian National Congress (INC) and TDP. Political analysts attributed this to the articulate speeches of the double master's degree holder turned-politician that won the hearts of Hyderabadis and positioned him as the most preferred leader among young voters.

Rao is lauded for the victory of TRS in the GHMC polls since the party had a bitter loss when it contested for the local government (Municipal Corporation of Hyderabad) elections in 2002, when it ended up winning just one division.

=== Municipal Administration and Urban Development and Brand Hyderabad ===
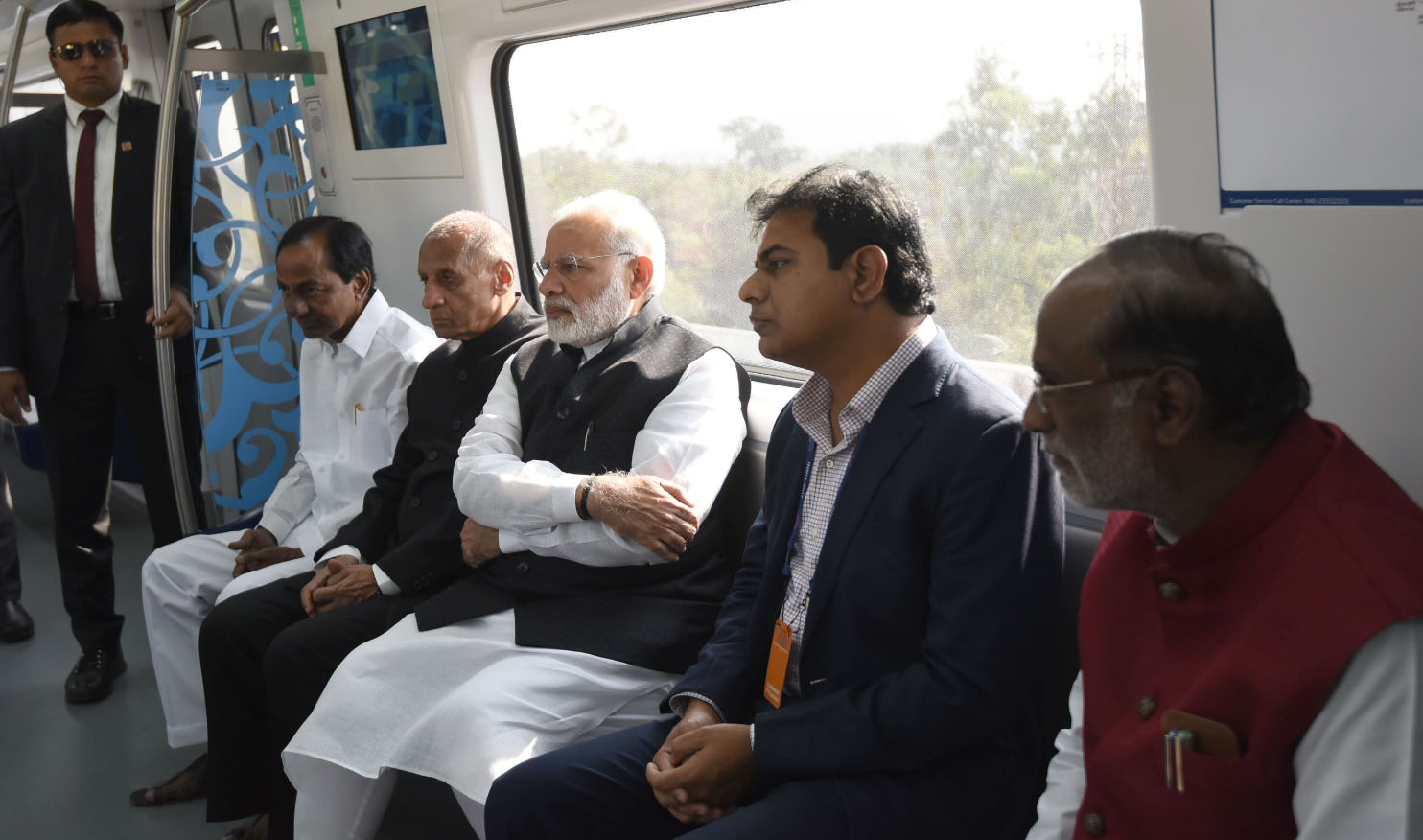
Rao (second from right) with the Prime Minister Narendra Modi (third from right) in Hyderabad Metro in 2017

Rao was assigned the Municipal Administration and Urban Development portfolio in addition to the Information Technology, Electronics and Communications portfolio.

To rejuvenate the polluted Musi River, Rao announced that the state government would seek a Rs 3,000 crore loan from the Green Climate Fund (GCF) in Incheon, South Korea. He also urged industrialists, manufacturers, and hoteliers not to discharge waste into the drains, warning of action against violators.

In March 2016, Rao said that the government was prepared to establish special-purpose vehicles, provide speedy clearances and ensure proper dispute redressal mechanism for firms investing in key infrastructure projects, including flyovers, expressways, in the capital region.

Rao aimed at revitalising Hyderabad and boosting the state's economy by launching the Happening Hyderabad initiative for 52 events across 52 weeks a year. The concept encourages the hosting of various events in the city, from music and dance programs to food and art events. with the Telangana government supporting event organizers financially or through branding, a first for any state government in India.

Rao replied to a query in the State Assembly in March 2016 that 74 per cent of the Hyderabad Metro Rail project was completed. He informed members of the House that the metro line had been laid to an extent of 43 km in a short span of time and claimed that it is a world record for the world's biggest metro project in public private partnership.

In March 2016, Rao announced that the long-pending Charminar Pedestrianisation Project (CPP) in Old City area of Hyderabad would be completed by August, and it would be opened to public.

Rao laid the foundation stone for the IMAGE (Innovation in Multimedia, Animation, Gaming and Entertainment) Tower at Hyderabad Knowledge City, Raidurgam on 5 November 2017. The tower was launched as a centre of excellence with state-of-the-art facilities for animation, visual effects, gaming and comics sectors in Telangana.

In December 2024, case was registered against KTR in connection with alleged mismanagement of funds and payments made in bringing the Formula E car racing event to Hyderabad in February 2023, when KTR was the state's minister for MAUD.

== Awards and recognition ==
- Inspirational Icon Of The Year - For Politics, by News18
- Ritz Magazine Skoch Challenger of the Year 2015
- IT Minister of the year 2017 by Skoch.

== Electoral history ==
=== Telangana Legislative Assembly ===
Year	Constituency	Party	Votes	%	Opponent	Opponent Party	Opponent Votes	%	Result	Margin	%
2023	Sircilla	BRS	89,244	47.28	Kondam Karuna Mahender Reddy	INC	59,557	31.56	Won	29,687	15.72
2018	Sircilla	TRS	125,213	70.89	Kondam Karuna Mahender Reddy	INC	36,204	20.50	Won	89,009	50.39
2014	Sircilla	TRS	92,135	58.36	Konduru Ravinder Rao	INC	39,131	24.79	Won	53,004	33.57
2010	Sircilla (by-election)	TRS	87,876	66.05	Konduru Ravinder Rao	INC	19,757	14.77	Won	68,119	32.48
2009	Sircilla	TRS	36,783	26.9	Kondam Karuna Mahender Reddy	IND	36,612	26.8	Won	171	0.1
