= Gambhiraopet =

- Village
- Location in Telangana, India Gambhiraopet (India)
- Coordinates: 18.3000°N 78.5833°E
- Country: India
- State: Telangana
- District: Rajanna Sircilla
- Talukas: Gambhiraopet
- Elevation: 421 m (1,381 ft)

Population
  - Total: 20,986

Languages
  - Official: Telugu & Hind,
- Time zone: UTC+5:30 (IST)
- PIN: 505304
- Telephone code: 08723
- Vehicle registration: TS 25
- Website: telangana.gov.in

Gambhiraopet is a village in Gambhiraopet mandal of Rajanna Sircilla district And territory district Karimnagar in the state of Telangana in India. and there are 18 villages under gambhiraopet mandal and mixed religious people live there i.e. Hindu, Muslim, Christians and it has to be taluka before but it remains as a mandal.

Gambhiraopet has a tourist attraction Akhanda Dweepam, from the chalukya rule 800 years ago.

== Geography ==
Gambhiraopet is located at 18.3000°N 78.5833°E. It has an average elevation of 421 metres (1,381 ft) above mean sea level.
