= Mustabad =

Mustabad ముస్తాబాద్
- Village
- Location in Telangana, India Mustabad (India)
- Coordinates: 18.2787°N 78.7108°E
- Country: India
- State: Telangana
- District: Rajanna Sircilla
- Mandal: Mustabad mandal
- Elevation: 575 m (1,886 ft)

Population (2011)
  - Total: 8,665

Languages
  - Official: Telugu
  - Other: Urdu
- Time zone: UTC+5:30 (IST)
- PIN: 505404
- Telephone code: 08723
- Vehicle registration: TS
- Website: telangana.gov.in

Mustabad is a village and mandal headquarters of Mustabad mandal, located in Rajanna Sircilla district of Telangana, India.

== Geography ==
Mustabad is located at 18.2787°N 78.7108°E.

== Transport ==
=== Rail ===
The Kothapalli-Manoharabad railway line is nearby and connects the town to Hyderabad.
