= Rajanna Sircilla district =

- District of Telangana
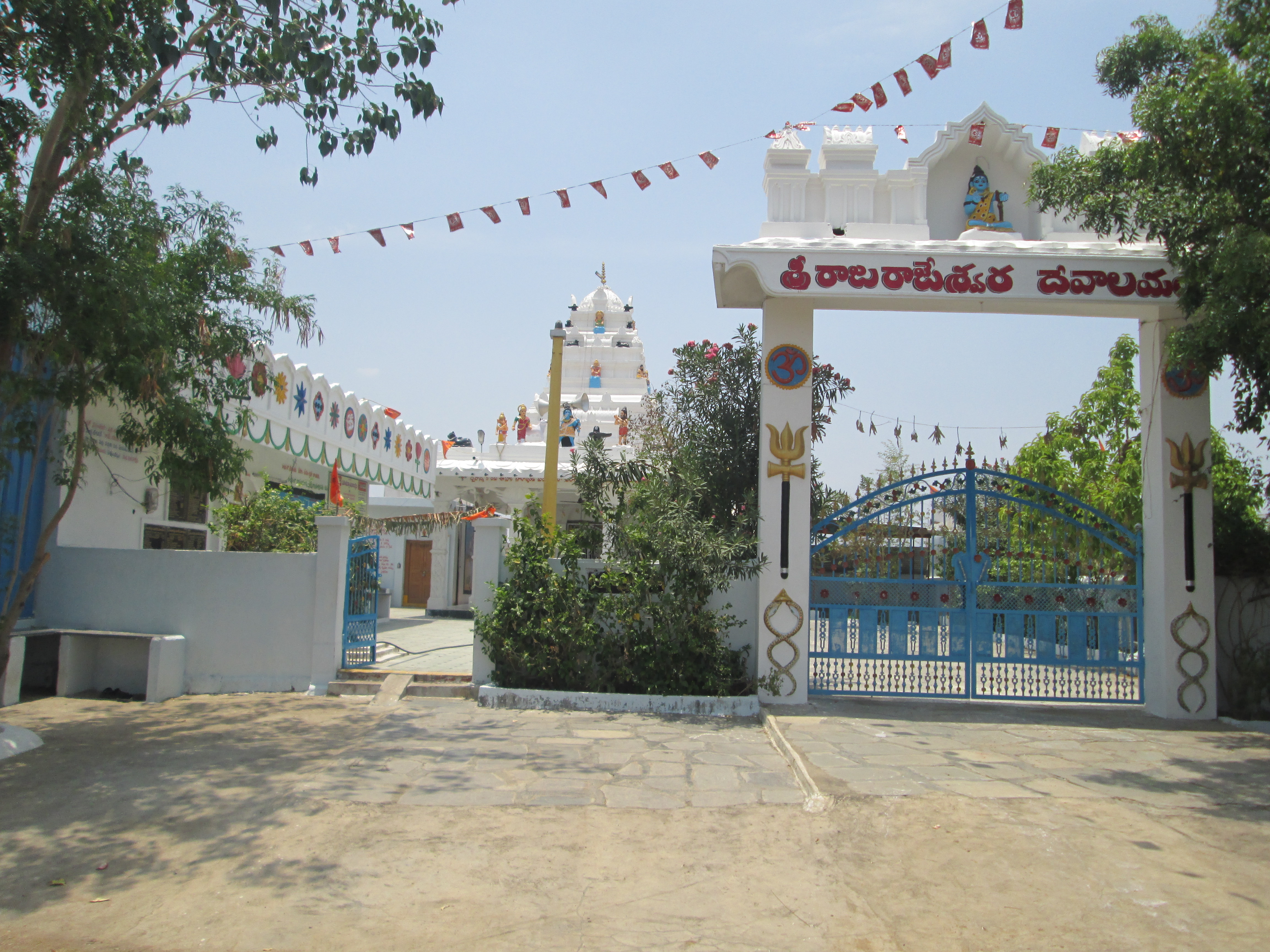
- Sri Raja Rajeswara Temple in Akkannapet

- Location in Telangana
- Rajanna Sircilla district
- Country: India
- State: Telangana
- Named for: Rajanna (Lord Shiva)
- Headquarters: Sircilla
- Mandalas: 13

Government
  - District collector: Devarakonda Krishna Bhaskar
  - Parliament constituencies: Karimnagar
  - Assembly constituencies: Sircilla, Vemulawada, Choppadandi

Area
  - Total: 2,019 km^{2} (780 sq mi)

Population (2016)
  - Total: 552,037
  - Density: 273.4/km^{2} (708.2/sq mi)
  - Urban: Sircilla and Vemulawada

Demographics
  - Literacy: 62.71%
  - Sex ratio: 1014
- Time zone: UTC+05:30 (IST)
- Vehicle registration: TG–23
- Major highways: Karimnagar-Sircilla-Kamareddy; Sircilla-Siddipet-Suryapet
- Website: rajannasircilla.telangana.gov.in

Rajanna Sircilla district is a district in the Indian state of Telangana. Sircilla is the district headquarters. The district shares boundaries with Karimnagar, Siddipet, Jagtial, Kamareddy, and Nizamabad districts.

M. Haritha assumed charge Collector of Rajanna-Sircilla district succeeding Sandeep Kumar Jha on 29 September 2025.

== Geography ==
The district is spread over an area of 2,030.89 square kilometres (784.13 sq mi). This district is bounded by Jagtial District in the North, Karimnagar District in the North East, Siddipet District in the South, Kamareddy District in the West and Nizamabad District in the North West.

== Demographics ==
Religion in Rajanna-Sircilla district (2011)
Hinduism	94.75%
Islam	4.05%
Christianity	0.87%
Other or not stated	0.33%

As of 2011 Census of India, the district has a population of 552,037. Rajanna-Sircilla district has a sex ratio of 1014 females per 1000 males and a literacy rate of 62.71%. 48,751 (8.83%) were under 6 years of age. 116,892 (21.17%) lived in urban areas. Scheduled Castes and Scheduled Tribes made up 102,110 (18.50%) and 22,990 (4.16%) of the population respectively.

Languages of Rajanna-Sircilla district (2011)
1. Telugu (93.2%)
2. Urdu (3.50%)
3. Lambadi (2.50%)
4. Others (0.85%)

At the time of the 2011 census, 93.15% of the population spoke Telugu, 3.50% Urdu and 2.50% Lambadi as their first language.

== Administrative divisions ==
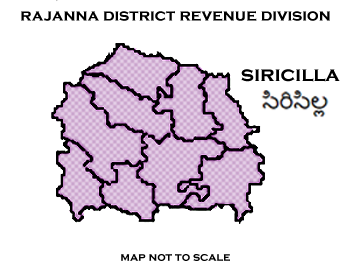
Sircilla District Revenue division

The district will have two revenue division of Sircilla and Vemulawada It is sub-divided into 13 mandals. Anuraag Jayanti IAS is the present collector of the district.

S No.	Sircilla Revenue Division	Vemulawada Revenue Division
1.	Sircilla	Vemulawada
2.	Thangallapalli	Vemulawada Rural
3.	Gambhiraopet	Chandurthi
4.	Yellareddipet	Konaraopeta
5.	Veernapalli	Boinpalli
6.	Mustabad	Rudrangi
7.	Ellanthakunta	

== Villages ==
- Pothugal

== See also ==
- List of districts in Telangana
