= Pranahita Pushkaralu =

Indian festival

Pranahita Pushkaram
- Status: Active
- Genre: Hindu festivals
- Frequency: every 12 years
- Venue: List of Major Ghats: Tummidi Hatti; Arjunigutta; Vemanpalli; Kaleshwaram
- Location: Pranahita River
- Country: India
- Most recent: 2010
- Next event: April 13 - 24, 2022
- Area: South India
- Major events: Holy river dip

Pranahita Pushkaralu is a festival of River Pranahita normally occurs once in 12 years. The Pushkaram is observed for a period of 12 days from the time of entry of Jupiter into Pisces (Meena rasi).

== See also ==
- Godavari Pushkaralu
- Pushkaram
