= Sarasvati Pushkaram =

Indian river festival

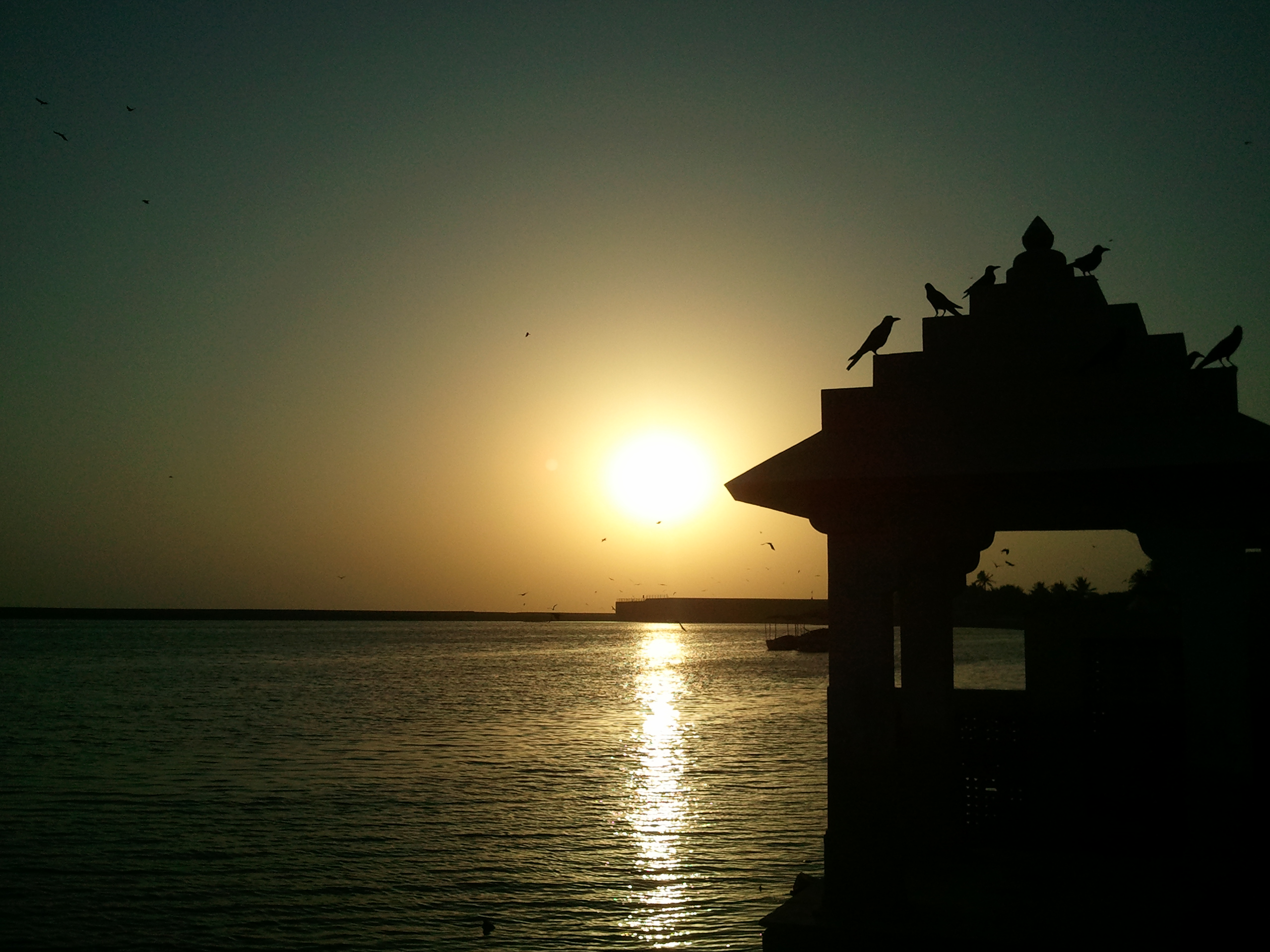
- Triveni Ghat in Somanth is the confluence of three holy rivers namely Kapil, Hiran and a mystical River Saraswathy.
- Status: Active
- Genre: Hindu festivals
- Frequency: every 12 years
- Venue: Triveni Sangam
- Locations: Prayag, Uttar Pradesh, Kaleshwaram, Telangana
- Country: India
- Most recent: May 31, 2013
- Next event: 2037
- Area: North India
- Major events: Holy river dip

Sarasvati Pushkaram is a festival of River Sarasvati that normally occurs once every 12 years. Saraswati River is considered as the "Antarvahini" (invisible river) which flows at Triveni Sangam. This Pushkaram is observed for a period of 12 days from the time of entry of Jupiter into Mithuna rasi (Gemini).

Saraswati Pushkaram or Pushkaralu is a Hindu festival dedicated to the River Saraswati, celebrated once every 12 years when Jupiter (Brihaspati) enters the Zodiac sign Gemini (Mithun). The event holds special spiritual significance and is marked by bathing rituals, religious ceremonies and cultural festivals on the bank of the river Godavari.

Kaleshwaram Saraswati Anthya Pushkaralu Mahotsav is from 21 May to 1 June.

== History and significance ==
Pushkaralu festivals are river-based festivals held across India that are associated with a specific river and zodiac sign. Saraswati Pushkaralu is linked to the mystical river Saraswati and is celebrated with great devotion, especially at the Triveni Sangamam in Kaleshwaram. People believe that the three rivers - Godavari, Pranahita and Saraswati meet here.

The Pushkaram period is considered highly auspicious for Hindus. People claim that taking a dip in the river during this period washes away sins and helps in getting freedom from the cycle of birth and death, they also believe that the period is a good time to pray and offer respect to their ancestors by performing rituals like Tarpan.

== Triveni Sangamam ==
At Kaleshwaram, the Triveni Sangamam is considered a sacred confluence where devotees gather to perform rituals. The confluence of three rivers makes the site particularly powerful in spiritual terms. People believe that taking a holy dip during Pushkaralu provides spiritual purification and fulfils personal wishes.

During the 12-day festival, a variety of homams, pujas and aarti are conducted at major temples such as the Kaleshwara Mukteswara Swamy Temple and Shri Maha Saraswati Ammavari Temple.↵Common practices include:

- Snanam (Holy Dip) at the Godavari and Saraswati Ghats.
- Tarpanam to honor ancestors.
- Participation in homams for health, knowledge, family welfare and spiritual growth.

== Key Rituals and Homams ==
=== Godavari Ghat, Kaleshwaram ===
- Timings: 5:00 AM to 7:00 PM
- Devotees perform rituals and take a holy dip.

=== Saraswati Ghat (Triveni Sangamam) ===
- Timings: 5:00 AM to 7:00 PM
- The main site of the Triveni Sangam, where three rivers are believed to meet.

== Rivers and Zodiac Signs ==
The Pushkaram festivals are celebrated for 12 sacred rivers, each associated with a zodiac sign:

River	Zodiac Sign
Ganga	Aries
Yamuna	Cancer
Saraswati	Gemini
Narmada	Taurus
Godavari	Leo
Krishna	Virgo
Kaveri	Libra
Bhima	Scorpio
Tungabhadra	Capricorn
Sindhu	Aquarius
Pranahita	Pisces
Tapti	Sagittarius

In 2025, Saraswati Pushkaralu was from 15 May to 26 May in the town of Kaleshwaram, located in the Jayashankar Bhupalpally district of Telangana, India. It was inaugurated by CM Sri Anumula Revanth Reddy along with Sri Bhatti Vikramarku Mallu, Sri Duddilla Sridhar Babu, Sri Nalamada Uttam Kumar Reddy, Smt. Konda Surekha and Sri Ponnam Prabhakar.

In 2025, YatraDham.Org arranged the event, Saraswati Pushkaralu with the officials Saraswati Pushkaralu.

== See also ==
- Kumbh Mela
- Pushkaram
