= List of festivals in Andhra Pradesh =

Andhra Pradesh celebrates many religious festivals and has few holidays. Ugadi and Sankranti (Pedda Panduga) are the most significant festivals in the state. Festivals celebrated/observed by a considerable population are only listed here.

== Major religious festivals ==
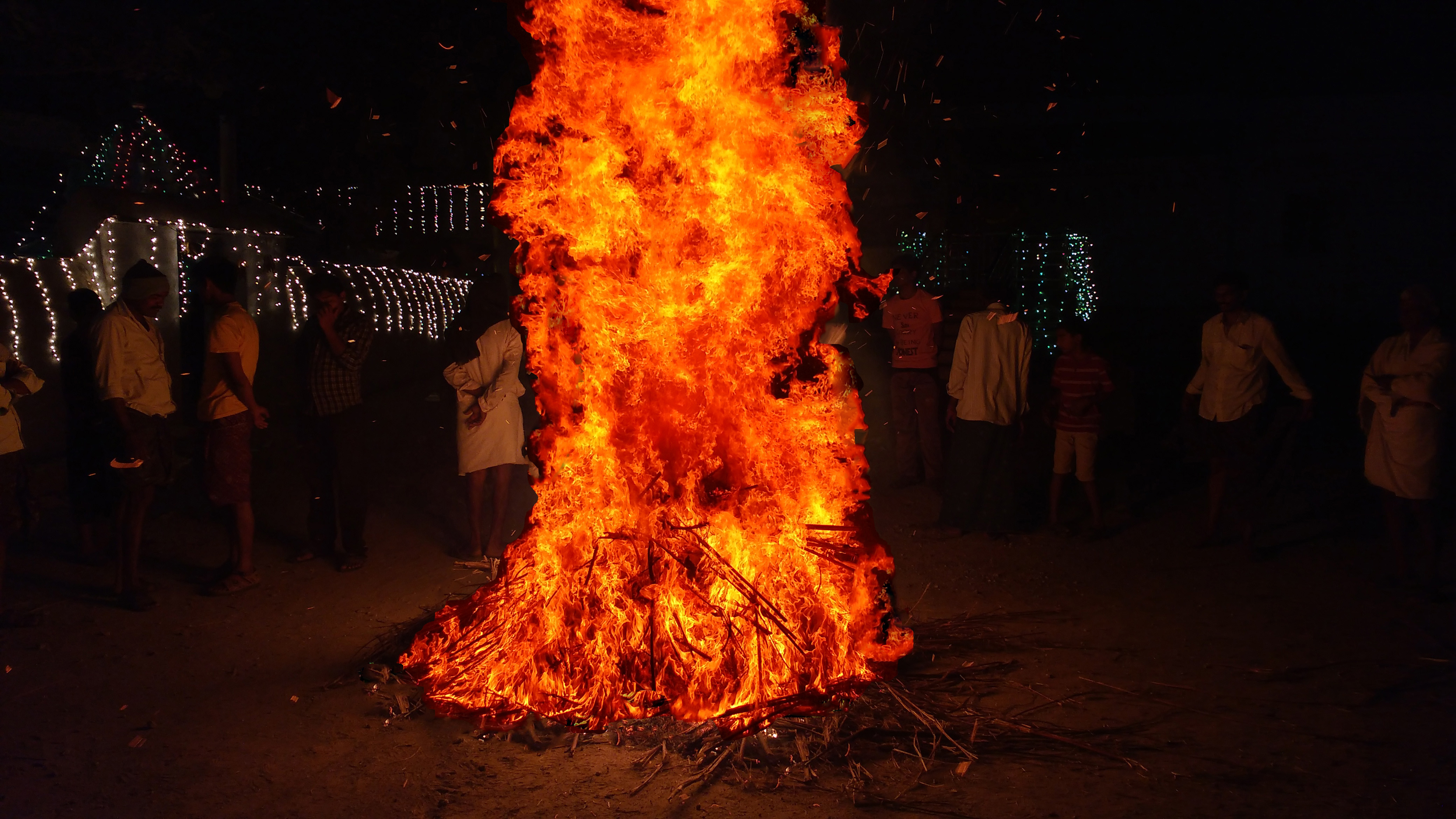
Bhogi bonfire in Andhra Pradesh

=== Annual ===
| Festival name | Date - Hindu lunar calendar | Date - Gregorian calendar | Description |
|---|---|---|---|
| Ugadi | 1st day of Chaitra | March–April | It is referred as the "Telugu New Year". Ugadi in Telugu means New Year |
| Sri Rama Navami | 9th day of Chaitra | March–April | Sri Rama Navami is the celebration of the birth of Rama. It is the day on which Lord Rama, the seventh incarnation of Lord Vishnu, incarnated in human form in Ayodhya. He is the ardha ansh of Vishnu or has half the divinitive qualities of Lord Vishnu. |
| Ekadasi | | July–August | |
| Varalakshmi Vratam | 2nd Friday of Sravanam | July–August | It is a puja performed by married Hindu women to seek the blessings of Mahalakshmi, goddess of wealth and prosperity. |
| Vinayaka Chavithi | 4th day of Bhaadrapadam | August–September | It is celebrated as the arrival of Vinayaka on the earth. |
| Navaratri | Chaitra and Ashvini | September–October | The nine-day festival of Durga culminates in Vijayadashami (Dasara). This is one of the three auspicious days of the year. |
| Vijayadashami | Tenth day of waxing moon of Ashvini | September–October | It is the Hindu celebration of good over evil. |
| Peerla Panduga | | | Observed by Muslims. It is a celebrated by across the Sufi shrines called as Ashurkhana. |
| Atla Tadde | 3rd night after the full moon in Ashvini | September–October | Celebrated by married Hindu women of Andhra Pradesh for the health and long life of their husbands. |
| Deepavali | Ashvini-Kartikam | October–November | Deepavali which means "row of lights/lamps" in Telugu. "Deepam" means lamp. The festival is celebrated on the occasion of Lord Krishna and his wife Satyabhama killing a demon Narakasura. Another story says the festival is celebrated for the return of Rama and Sita to the kingdom Ayodhya after fourteen years of exile. |
| Kartika Pournami | 15th of the Full moon day of Kartikam | November–December | |
| Bhogi | Maagam | 13 or 14 January | On Bhogi, the first day of Sankranthi festive season, people discard old and derelict things and concentrate on new things causing change or transformation. At dawn, people light a bonfire with logs of wood, other solid-fuels and wooden furniture at home that are no longer useful. The disposal of derelict things is where all old habits, vices, attachment to relations and material things are sacrificed in the sacrificial fire of the knowledge of Rudra, known as the "Rudra Gita Jnana Yajna". It represents realization, transformation and purification of the soul by imbibing and inculcating various divine virtues. |
| Sankranthi | Maagam | 14 or 15 January | Sankranthi marks the transition of the Sun into Makara rasi. It is an important harvest festival in India. |
| Kanuma | Maagam | 15 or 16 January | Third day of the four-day Sankranthi festive season.Kanuma festival is a significant event in Andhra Pradesh which celebrates cattle worship. It takes place on the third day of Makar Sankranti and honors the divine intervention of Lord Krishna, who saved the villagers and their cattle from a deadly flood by lifting Govardhan Hill. |

=== Non-Annual ===
| Festival name | Date - Hindu lunar calendar | Date - Gregorian calendar | Description |
|---|---|---|---|
| Krishna Pushkaralu | | August | It is a festival of River Krishna which normally occurs once in every 12 years |
| Godavari Pushkaralu | Ashadam | June–July | It is a festival of Godavari River which normally occurs once in every 12 years |
| Tungabhadra Pushkaralu | | November–December | It is a festival of Tungabhadra River which normally occurs once in every 12 years |

== Minor Religious Festivals ==
| Festival name | Date - Hindu lunar calendar | Date - Gregorian calendar | Description |
|---|---|---|---|
| Maha Sivaratri | Thirteenth night of the waning moon of Maagam | February–March | Maha Sivaratri is the great night of Shiva, during which followers of Shiva observe religious fasting and the offering of Bael (Bilva) leaves to Shiva |
| Holi | Phalgunam full moon | March–April | The festival celebrates the eternal and divine love of Radha and Krishna. It also signifies the triumph of good over evil, as it celebrates the victory of Lord Vishnu as Narasimha Narayana over Hiranyakashipu. |
| Eid al-Fitr | – | May–July | The day marks the end of the month-long dawn-to-sunset fasting of Ramadan |
| Rakhi Purnima | Last day of Sraavanam | July–August | |
| Krishnashtami | Ashtami in the dark half of Shravan | August–September | Birthday of Lord Krishna on Shravan Vadya ashtami is observed with a fast. |
| Christmas | – | 25 December | It is an annual festival commemorating the birth of Jesus Christ. |
