= Kaveri Pushkaram =

Kaveri Maha Pushkaram
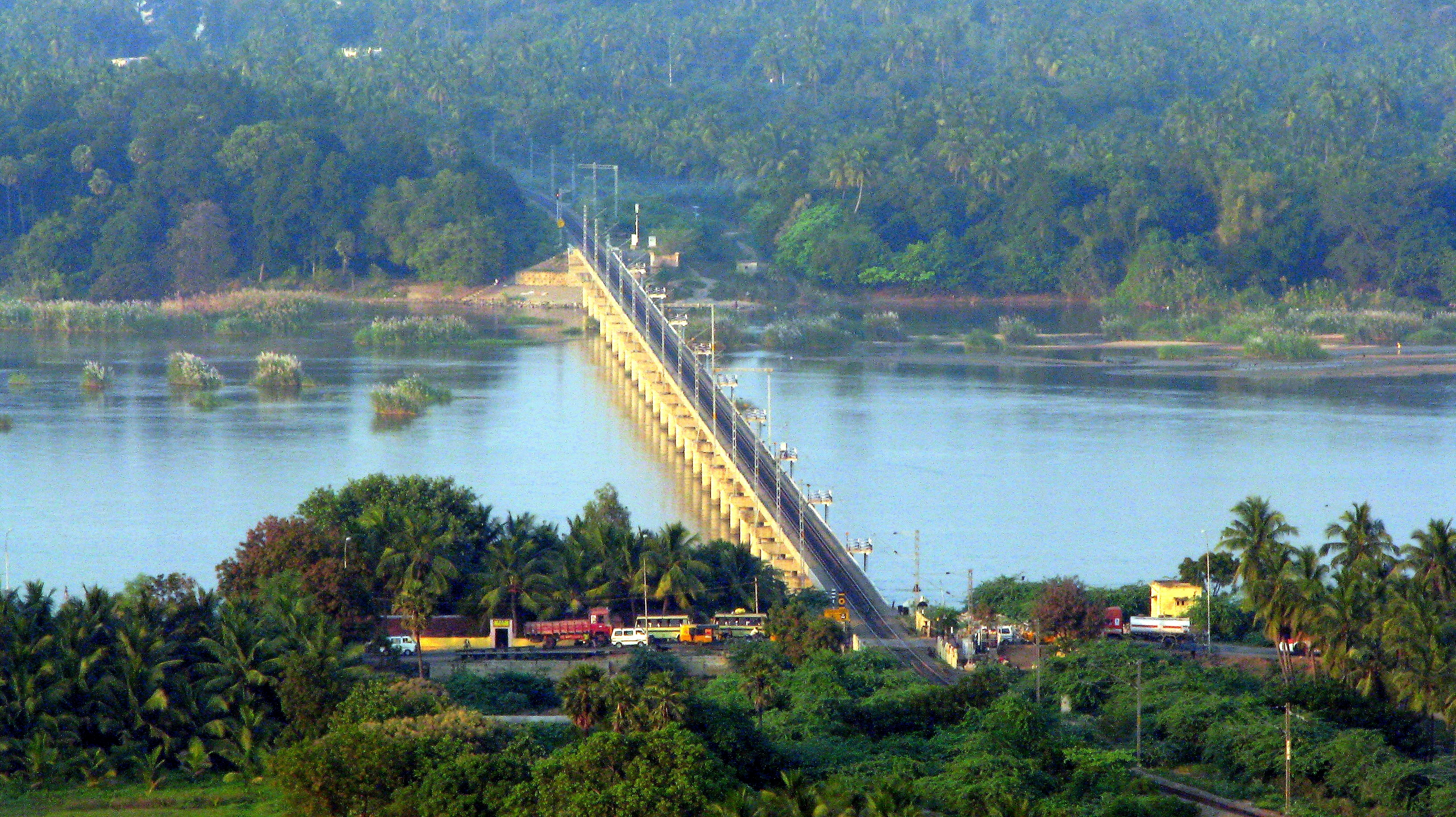
- Kaveri river, Trichy
- Status: Celebrated
- Genre: Hindu festivals
- Frequency: every 12 years(144 years Maha Pushkaram)
- Venue: List of Major Ghats: Srirangam; Mayiladuthurai
- Location: Kaveri River
- Country: India
- Most recent: 12–23 September 2017
- Next event: in 2029
- Area: Karnataka, Tamil Nadu
- Major events: Holy river dip

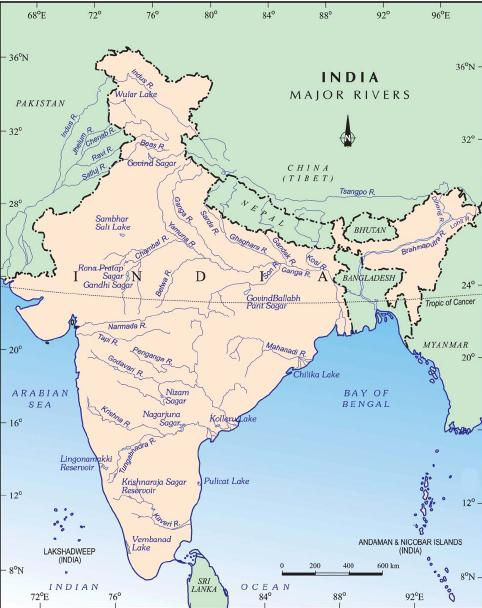
Course of the River through the South Indian Peninsula

Kaveri Pushkaram is a festival of River Kaveri that normally occurs once in 12 years.

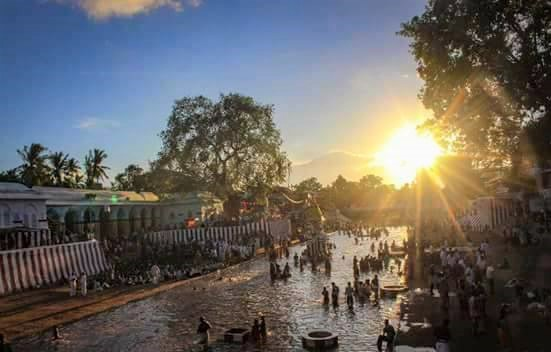
Sunrise in Thula Ghat-Kaveri Mayiladuthurai

== Mayiladuthurai ==
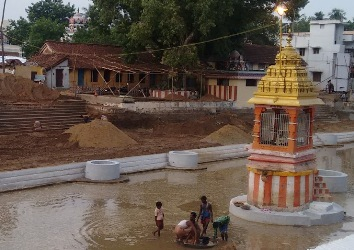
Mayiladuthurai is getting ready for Pushkaram

Mayiladuthurai (mayil-aadum-thurai which means “a place where peacock dances” ) is a town in Mayiladuthurai district in Tamil Nadu. The town is located at a distance of 281 km (175 mi) from the state capital Chennai. Mayiladuthurai is known for the Mayuranathaswami Temple, a prominent Shaivite shrine and Parimala Ranganathar Temple, one of the 108 Divya Desams.

Maha Pushkaram was celebrated with grandeur in Mayiladuthurai from 12 September – 24 September 2017. As the configuration and alignment of stars happen once in 144 years, the devotees throng the Thula ghat to have a holy dip. Veda Parayanam, Homam, Maha Yagnam, cultural activities such as music, traditional dances, spiritual discourses, Annadhanam, and pithru tharpanam are organized during festival days. A permanent tank with concrete flooring and one foot of sand amidst the river to hold water was set up. The Kanchi acharyas and other prominent Mutt heads have come to grace the occasion at Mayilduthurai.

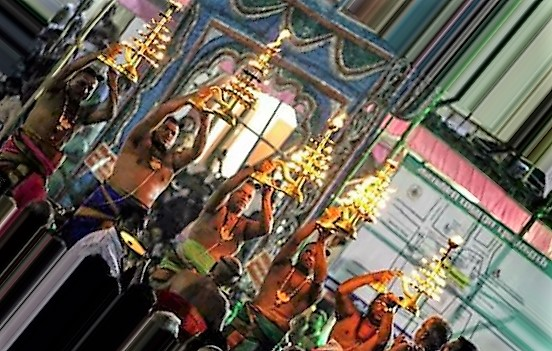
Kaveri Arathi in Thula Ghat

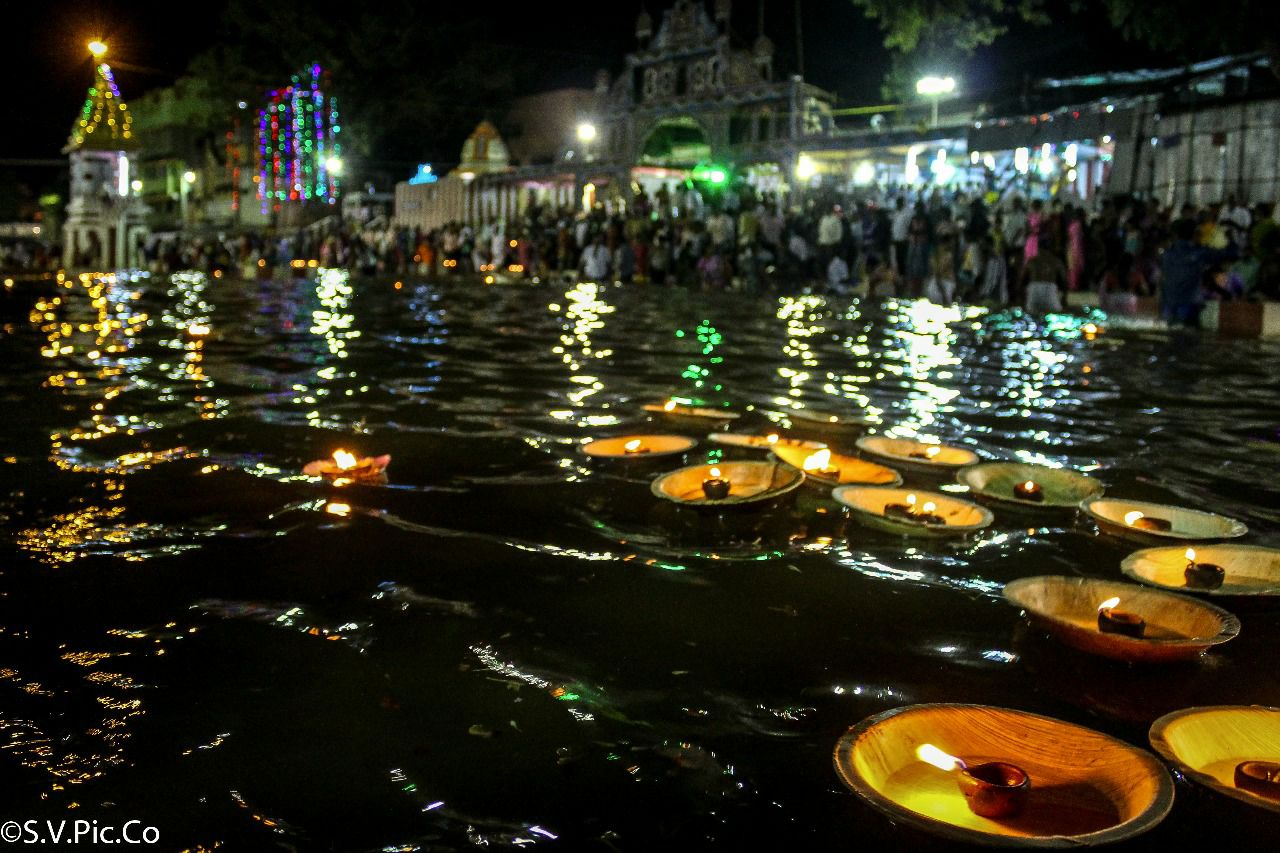
Lamps in Kaveri-Thula Ghat

== Events in Thula Ghat ==
The main event is at the Thula Kattam in Mayiladuthurai on the Cauvery, thousands of devotees sprinkled the holy water from the specially crafted tank readied as part of the Maha Pushkaram efforts. The Thula Kattam was renovated at a cost of ₹3 crore and the 12 sacred wells(built during medieval chola period) in the Thula Kattam also underwent a major revival. An idol of Kaveri matha was installed in the shores of river and poojas are being performed as part of this celebration

Early on day one, yagasala poojas were carried out at the Mangala Vinayakar shrine at the Vadapal Karai and Kanchi Acharyas Sri Jayendra Saraswathi and Sri Sankara Vijayendra Saraswati Swamigals along with Dharmapuram and Thiruvavaduthurai Adheenam pontiffs poured the sanctified waters at the yagasala on to River Cauvery.

The processional deities of Sri Mayuranatha Swamy, Sri Ayyarappar, Sri Kasi Viswanathar, Sri Vatharanyeswarar arrived at the banks of the Thula Kattam and soon after, abishekam was performed for the Astra Devars of those deities even as the Mutt heads took a holy dip to mark the commencement of the Cauvery Maha Pushkaram. The devotees followed the pontiffs in participating in the event.

== Other places ==
Apart from Mayiladuthurai, the festival is also held in Srirangam. It is also conducted along the course of the river at:

- Talakaveri
- Hogenakkal
- Bhavani Kooduthurai
- Mettur
- Kodumudi
- Kokkarayanpettai at Tiruchengode
- Karur
- Paramathi Velur
- Thirueengoimalai
- Nerur
- Kulithalai
- Thirupparaithurai
- Grand Anicut
- Thirukkattupalli
- Thiruvaiyaru
- Kumbakonam
- Courtallam
- Poompuhar

== See also ==
- Kumbh Mela
- Godavari Pushkaram
- Krishna Pushkaram
- Pushkaram
