= Andhra Muslims =

Ethnic group of Muslims from Andhra Pradesh, India

Regions with significant populations
- India

Religions
- Islam

Languages
- Telugu • Hindustani (mainly Deccani dialect)

Related ethnic groups
- Hyderabadi Muslims • Marathi Muslims • Bhatkal Muslims • other Indian Muslims

Andhra Muslims is a name given to Muslims hailing from Andhra Pradesh, India. Andhra Muslims have distinct traditions and culture both from the rest of the Muslim world and the wider culture of the area they live in.

== Population ==
According to the Census of 2001, Andhra Pradesh has a population of approximately 7 million Muslims who form a little under 9% of the State's population.

== See also ==
- Religion in Andhra Pradesh
- Bangalori Urdu
- Hyderabadi Urdu
