= Yamuna Pushkaram =

Festival of River Yamuna that occurs every 12 years

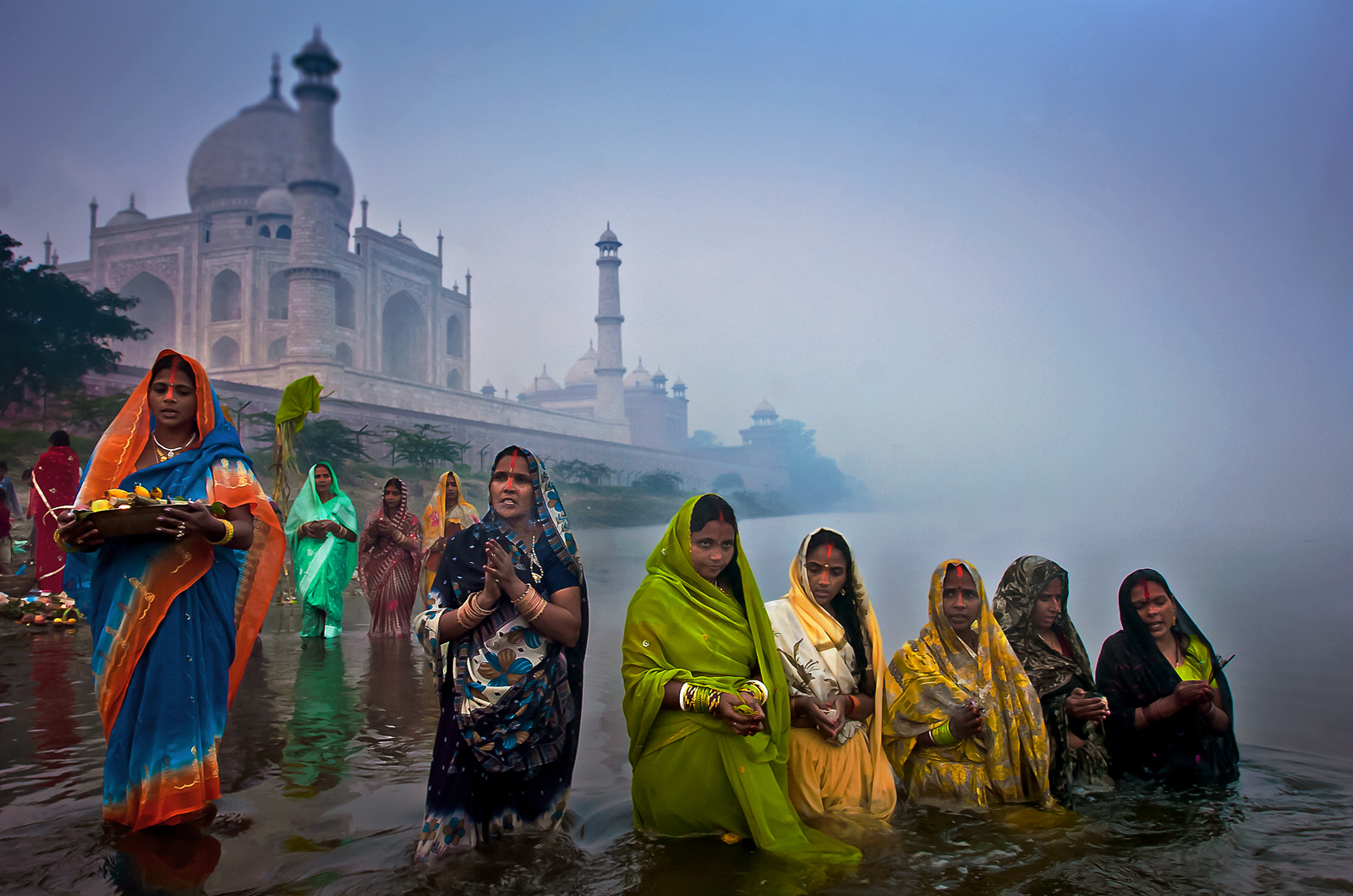
- Devotees offer prayer in the river Yamuna beside Taj Mahal
- Status: Active
- Genre: Hindu festivals
- Frequency: every 12 years
- Venue: List of Major Ghats: Mathura; Prayag; Kalpi
- Location: Yamuna River
- Country: India
- Most recent: 19 June 2014
- Next event: 2–13 June 2026
- Area: Uttarakhand, Haryana and Uttar Pradesh
- Major events: Holy river dip

Yamuna Pushkaram is a festival of River Yamuna normally occurs once in 12 years. This Pushkaram is observed for a period of 12 days from the time of entry of Jupiter into Karka rasi (Cancer).

== See also ==
- Kumbh Mela
- Godavari Pushkaralu
- Pushkaram
