= Bannar River =

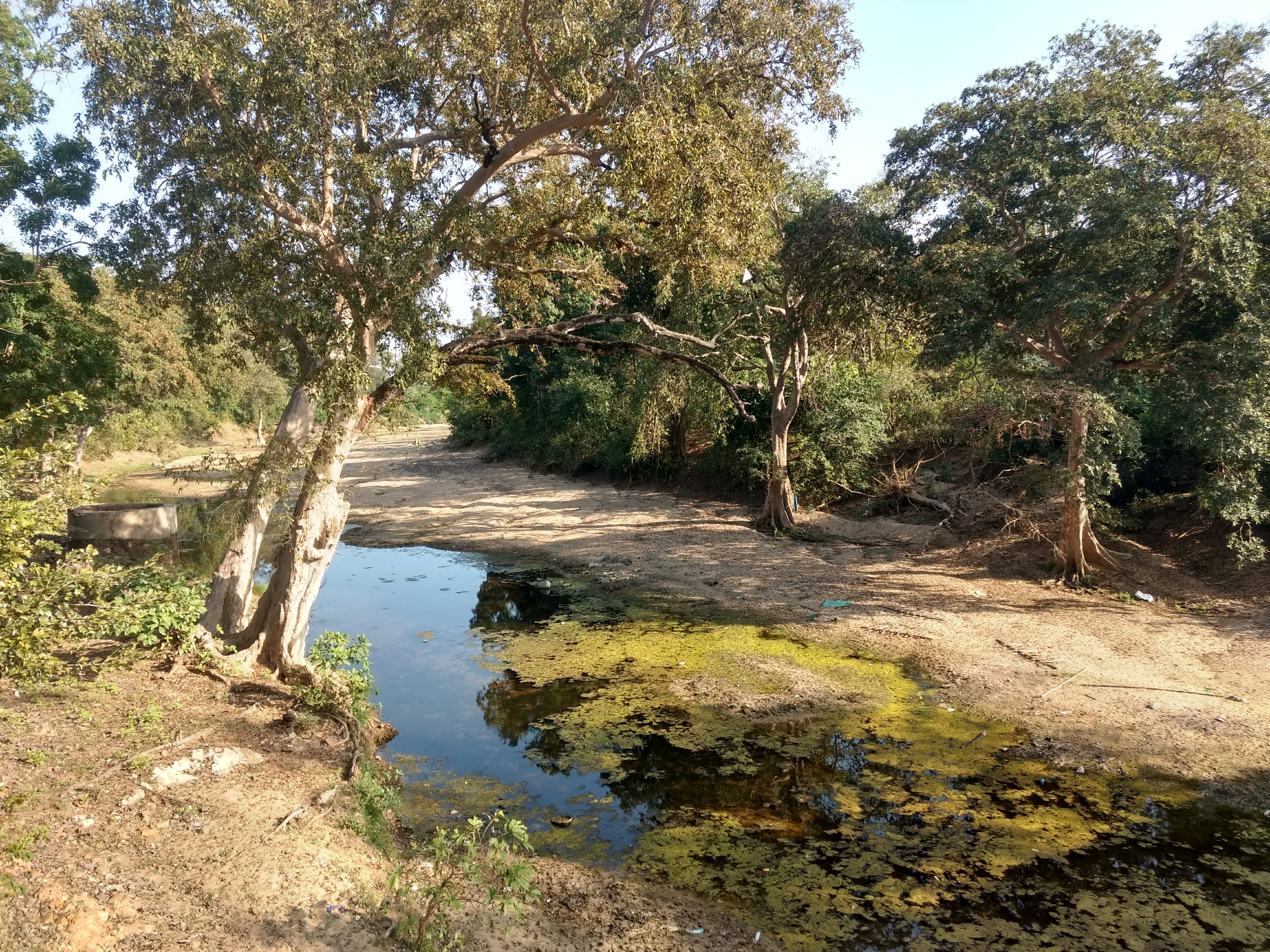
- Bamar River at Alapalli.jpg

Location
- State: Maharashtra
- District: Gadchiroli

Physical characteristics
- Mouth: Pranhita river
  - coordinates: 19.3829°N 79.9800°E

Basin features
- River system: Godavari basin
- Bridges: Bridge on NH 353C near Alapalli

Bannar river is a minor river in Gadchiroli district of Maharashtra. It is a minor tributary of Pranhita River and falls into it near Aheri.
