= Narmada Pushkaram =

Indian festival

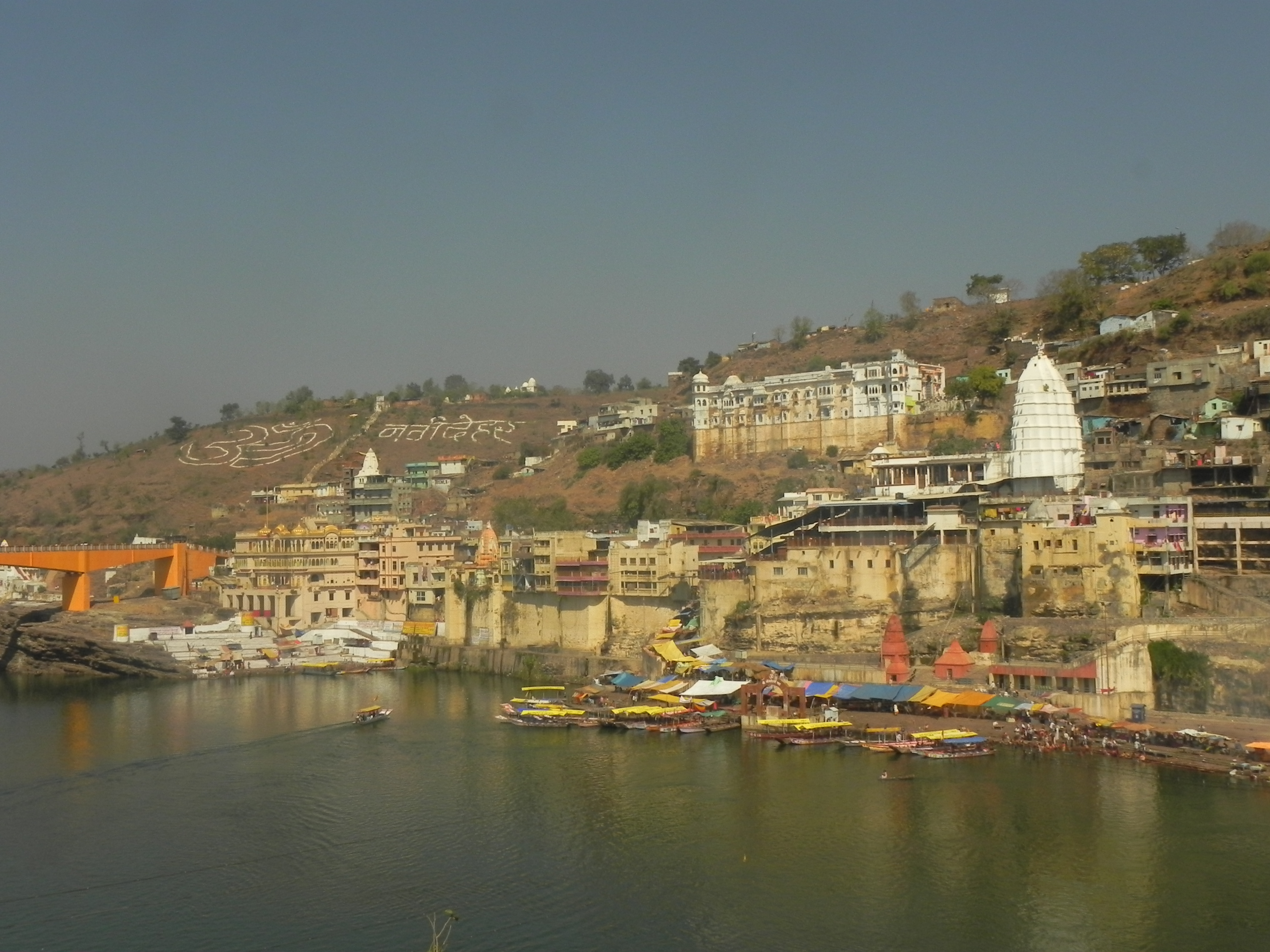
- Omkareshwar temple on Narmada river bank
- Status: Active
- Genre: Hindu festivals
- Frequency: Every 12 years
- Location: Narmada River
- Country: India
- Most recent: May 2024 (May 1st - May 12th)
- Next event: 2036
- Area: Central India
- Major events: Holy river dip

Narmada Pushkaram is a festival of River Narmada normally occurring once in 12 years. This Pushkaram is observed for a period of 12 days from the time of entry of Jupiter into Vrushabha Rasi (Taurus).

Amarkantak temple, Omkareshawar Temple, Chausath Yogini Temple, Chaubis Avatar Temple, Maheshwar Temple, Nemawar Siddheshwar Mandir and Bhojpur Shiva Temple are ancient temples ehich are known to be popular among tourist and local residents. Omkareshawar is one of the twelve Jyotirlingas and Amrarkantak is the best places to take holy dip in the Narmada river.

Significance

In Hinduism, the Narmada River carries deep spiritual significance, revered as sanctified by the divine essence of Lord Shiva. The Narmada Pushkaram signifies a sacred interval during which the river is venerated fervently, providing devotees a chance to absolve their transgressions and accrue spiritual blessings through ceremonial bathing in its hallowed currents. It is held that during this period, the river becomes imbued with celestial energy, amplifying the efficacy of every ritual and homage offered.

== See also ==
- Kumbh Mela
- Godavari Pushkaralu
- Pushkaram
