= Ganga Pushkaram =

Hindu festival, held every 12 years

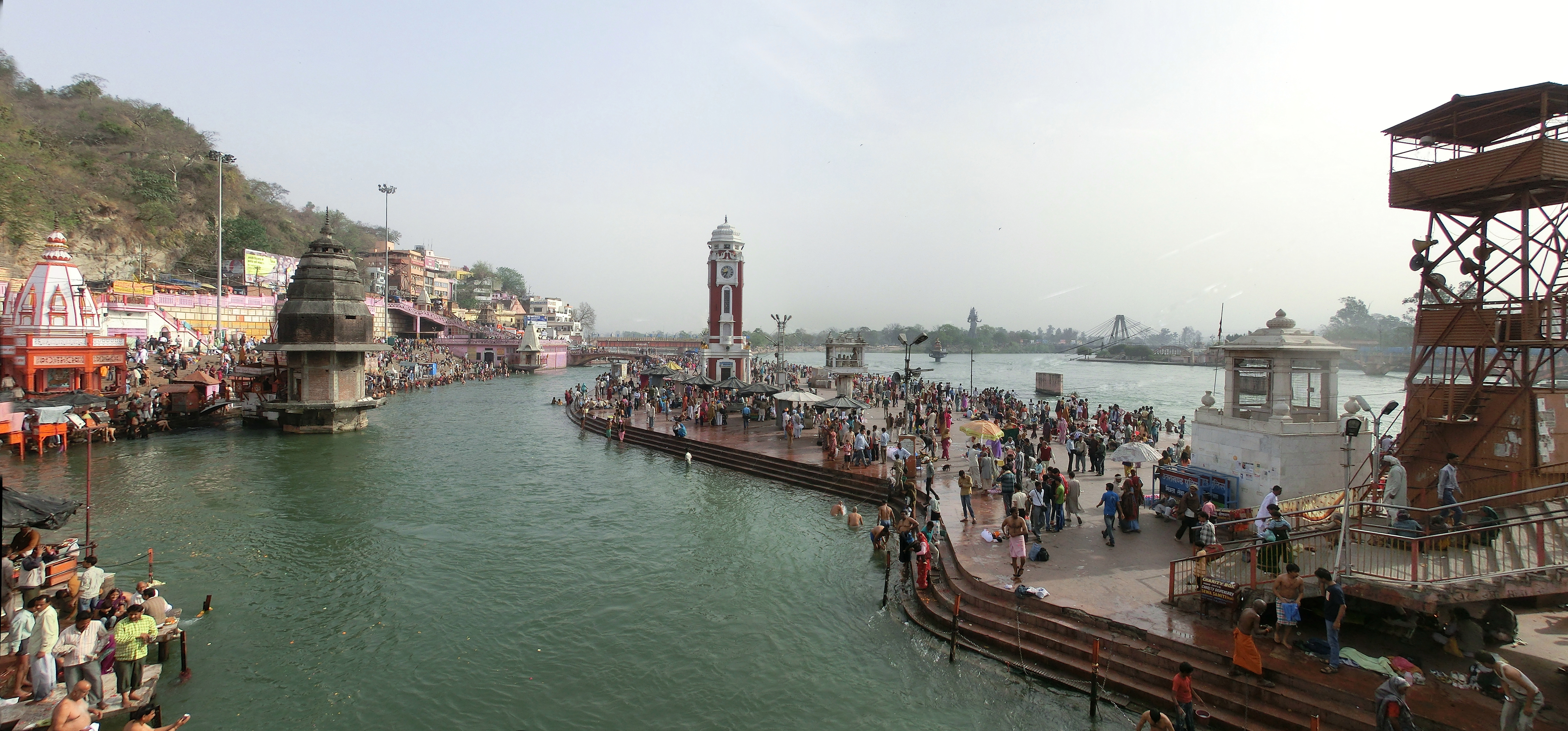
- Pilgrims taking dip in the holy Ganges river at Haridwar (2012)
- Status: Active
- Genre: Hindu festivals
- Frequency: every 12 years
- Venue: List of Major Ghats: Gangotri; Gangasagar; Haridwar; Badrinath; Kedarnath; Varanasi; Prayag
- Location: Ganga River
- Country: India
- Most recent: 2011
- Next event: 22 April – 5 May 2023
- Area: North India
- Major events: Holy river dip

Ganga Pushkaram is a festival of River Ganga which normally occurs once in 12 years. This Pushkaram is observed for a period of 12 days from the time of entry of Jupiter into Aswini nakshatra Mesha rasi (Aries).

== See also ==
- Kumbh Mela
- Godavari Pushkaram
- Pushkaram
