= Pranahita Wildlife Sanctuary =

Protected area in Telangana State, India

- IUCN category IV (habitat/species management area)
- Location within Telangana Location within India
- Interactive map of Pranahita Wildlife Sanctuary
- Location: Telangana State, India
- Nearest city: Mancherial
- Coordinates: 19°01′32″N 79°54′19″E
- Area: 136.2 km^{2} (52.6 sq mi)
- Established: 1980; 46 years ago
- Website: forests.telangana.gov.in/WildLife/PNWS.htm

Pranahita wildlife sanctuary is a protected area located in Mancherial district (Old Adilabad District) of Telangana State, India. It lies along the Pranahita River, and forms a contiguous ecological landscape with the Pranhita Wildlife Sanctuary in the neighbouring Maharashtra.

This sanctuary is on the bank of Pranahita River, 35 km (22 mi) away from Mancherial town. It is famous for Blackbuck and over 20 species of reptiles, over 50 species of birds, over 40 species of mammals.

== History ==
Pranahita was established on 13 March 1980, and covers an area of 136.02 km^{2} (52.52 sq mi). Pranahita is a southern tropical dry deciduous forests, with dry shrub jungle and grasslands.

== Visiting time ==
Best time to visit the place is in November to April.

There are forest rest houses at Mancherial and Chennur.

The air temperature varies from 15 to 40 °C (59 to 104 °F).

== How to reach ==
By road:

Hyderabad – Karimnagar – Mancherial – 258 km (160 mi)

By rail:

Hyderabad to Mancherial – 236 km (147 mi)

By air:

Nearest airport – Hyderabad
