= Religion in Andhra Pradesh =

Religion in Andhra Pradesh
1. Hinduism (90.9%)
2. Islam (7.30%)
3. Christianity (1.30%)
4. Jainism (0.10%)
5. Others & None (0.40%)

In the state of Andhra Pradesh the most widely professed religion is Hinduism, with significant Muslim communities. According to 2011 Census of India figures, Hindus (90.89%), Muslims (7.30%) and Christians (1.34%) form the three largest religious groups in the total population of the state. Jains (0.06%) and Buddhists (0.04%) are the minority religious groups of the state.

== Overview ==
=== Hinduism ===
Venkateswara Temple at Tirupati is the world's second-richest temple and is visited by millions of devotees throughout the year. Andhra Pradesh is home to Shankaracharya of Pushpagiri Peetham. Other Hindu saints include Sadasiva Brahmendra, Bhaktha Kannappa, Yogi Vemana, Sathya Sai Baba, and Pothuluru Veerabrahmendra.

Village deities or grama devata of village are also widely worshiped among the people of the villages. They are found in almost all villages throughout India, and more common in Andhra Pradesh along with Tamil Nadu. They are known as Kula deivam (guardian deity) and Local Village Gods. They are associated to a main deity who is generally ascribed as Kuladeivam by various communities and castes as part of the tracing their generation through centuries.

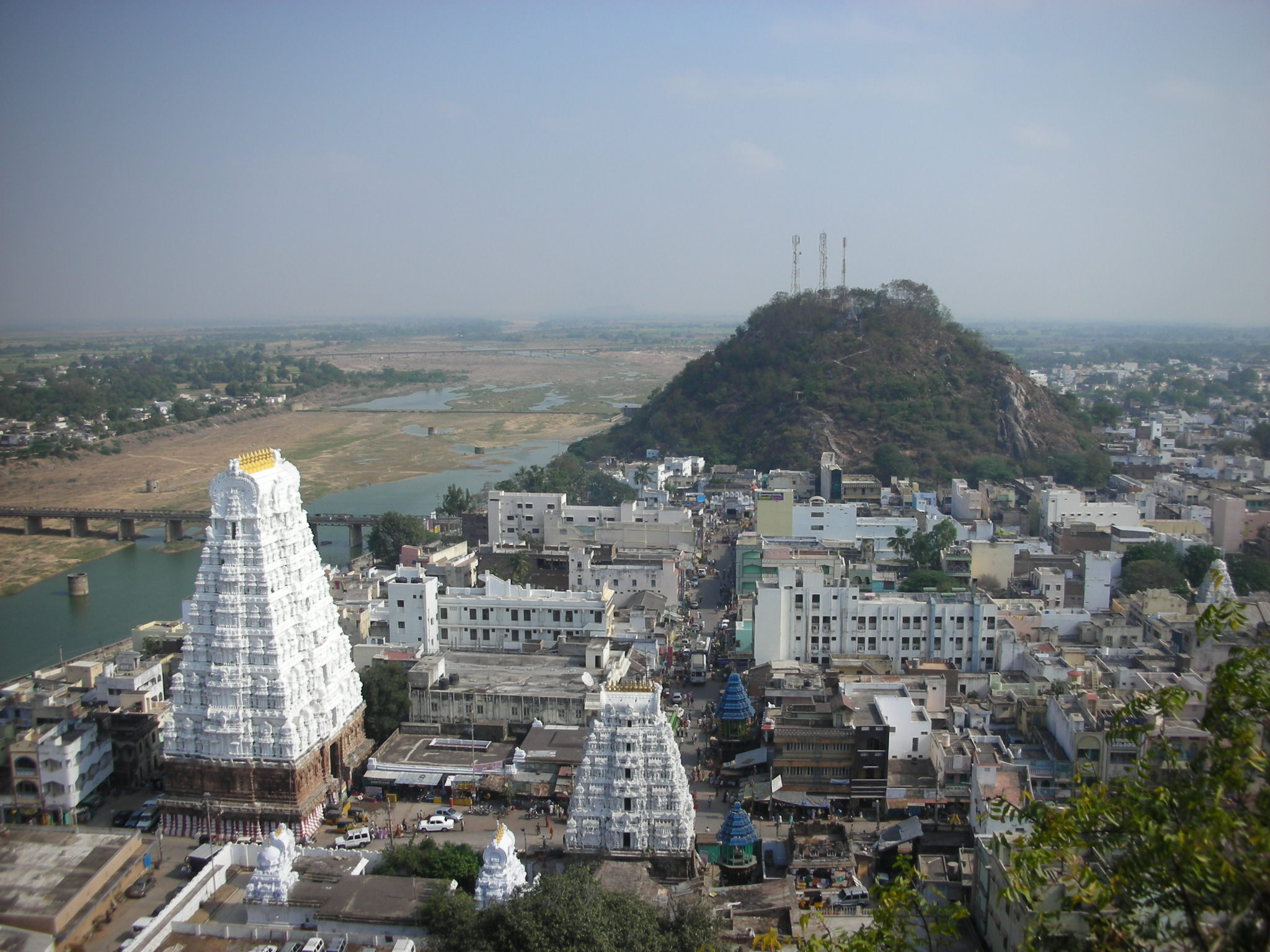
Srikalahasti Temple

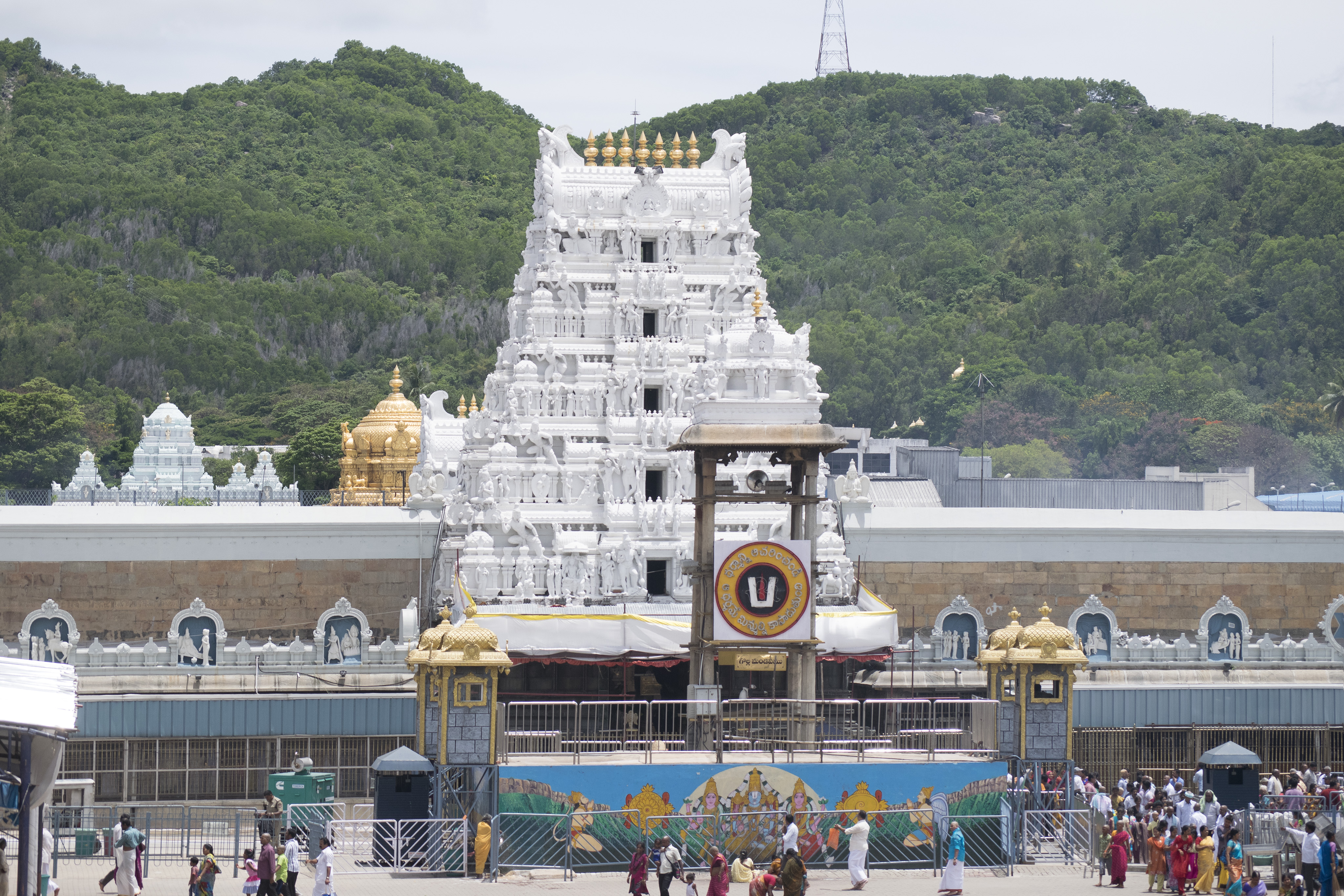
Venkateswara Temple, Tirumala

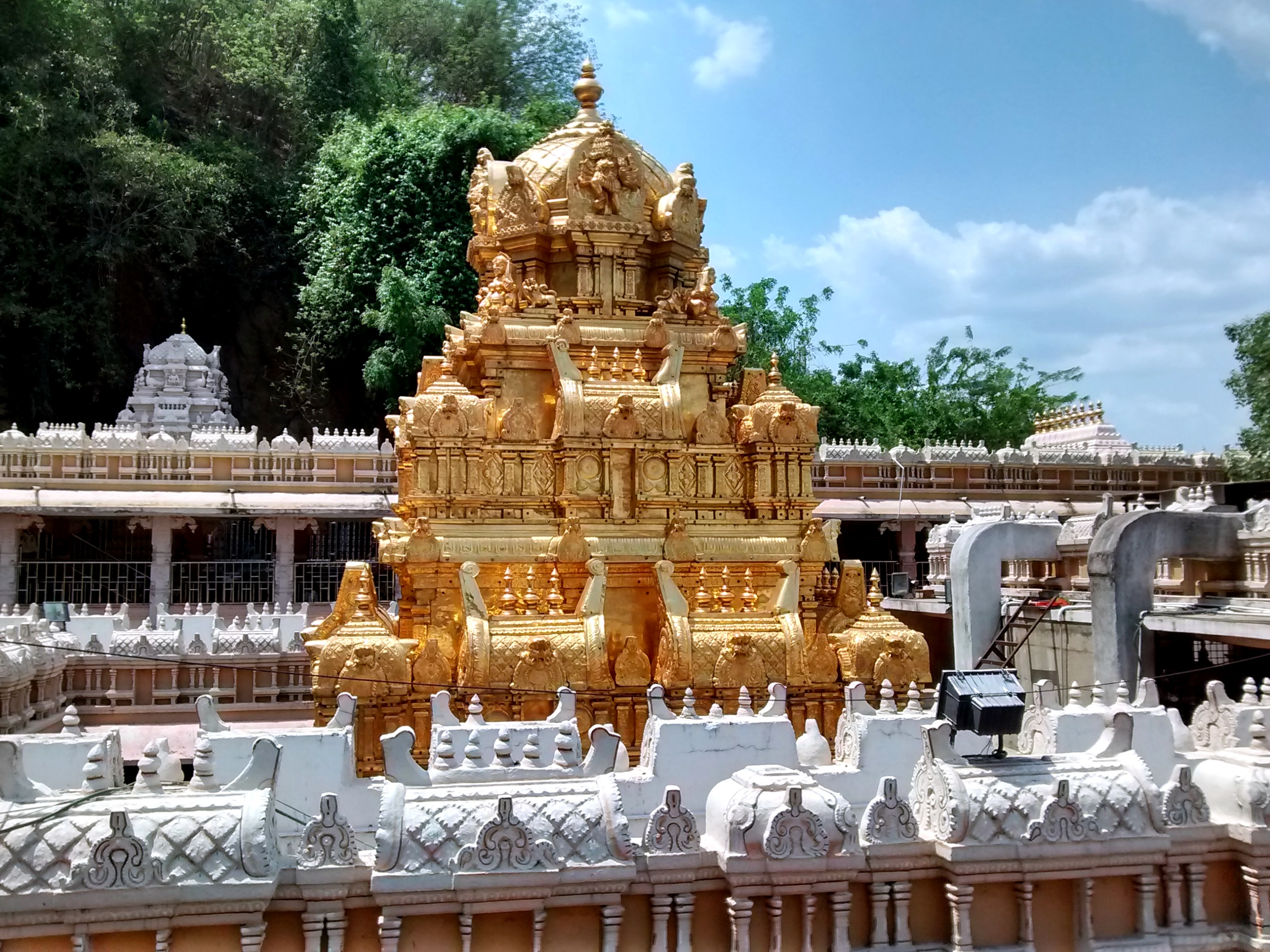
Kanaka Durga Temple, Vijayawada

=== Islam ===
Andhra Muslims have different traditions and culture both from the rest of the Muslim world and the wider culture of the area they live in. Andhra Muslims speak a distinct dialect of Urdu, referred to as Dakhini, however, most Andhra Muslims are fluent in Telugu as well. Most of the Andhra Muslims are Sunni, and follow the Hanafi school of Islamic Jurisprudence. There is also a minor Shia population in various districts.

Contrary to general impression that Islam started with Muslim invasions and forcible conversions, Islam in southern India grew gradually through traders and itinerant Sufis starting from 643 AD in Kerala. Proselytization was carried out by individual Sufi saints and major shrines may be found in Kadapa and Penukonda.

According to the Census of 2001, Andhra Pradesh has a population of approximately 7 million Muslims who form around a little under 9% of the State's population. Out of this around a million and a half live in Hyderabad. Therefore, an approximate figure for Andhra Muslims in Andhra region would be somewhere around 6 million. The sex ratio is around 960 females per 1000 males, higher than the national average of 933. The literacy rate stands at 68%, again higher than the national average of 64%.

=== Christianity ===
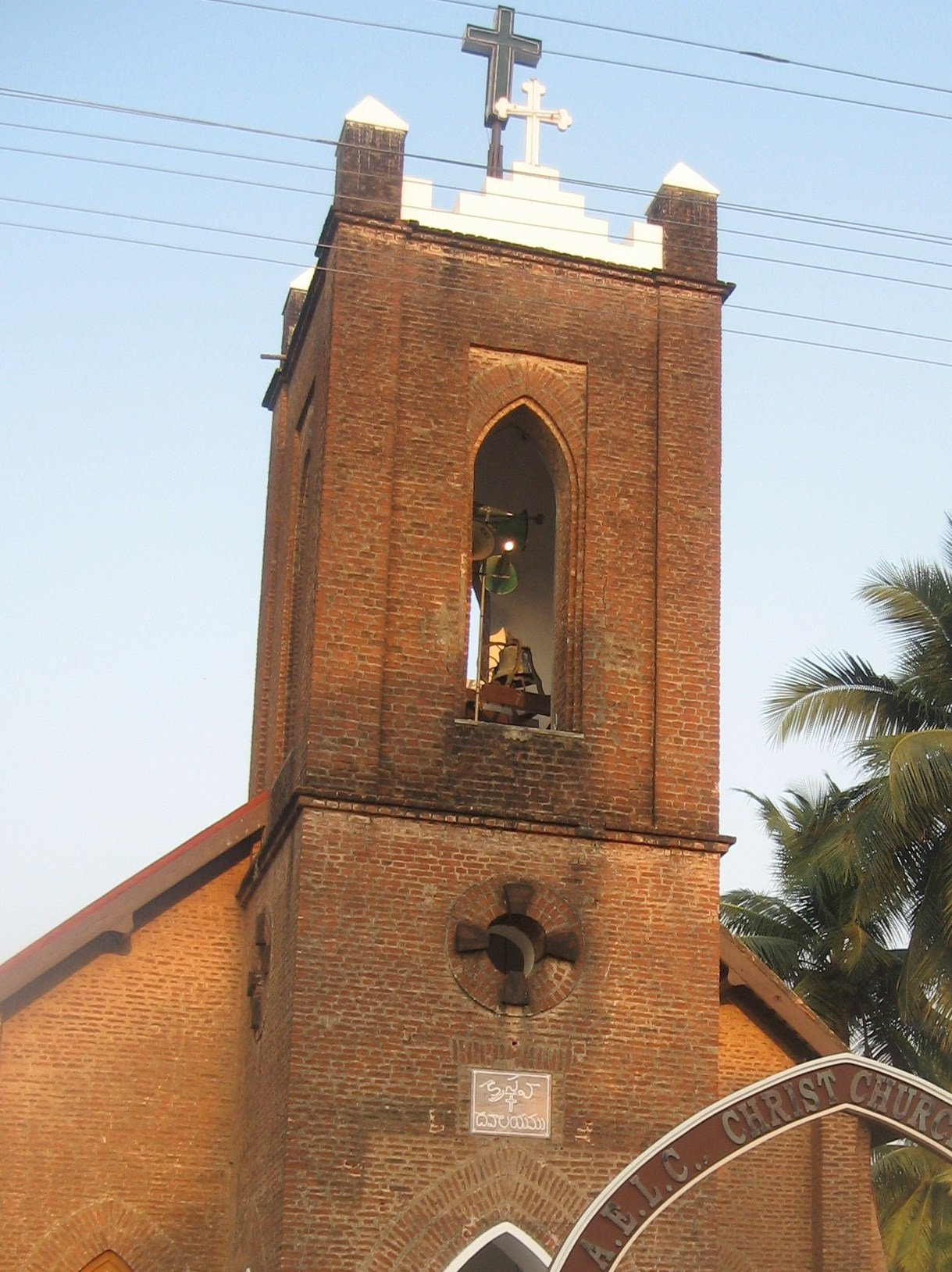
Church bells from belfries such as the one above of the Christ Lutheran Church, Narsapur are still used in rural congregations for tolling the death knell

According to the Census of India, there are over a million Christians in Andhra Pradesh, constituting 1.51% of the state's population, although a decrease from the 1971 census figure which was 2%, as a result of low birth rates and emigration. However this has long been considered a significant underestimate as the majority of Christians, who almost exclusively converted from Dalit communities such as Malas and Madigas, record their religious identity as "Hindu" on government forms to avail reservation benefits restricted to Hindu, Sikh, and Buddhist Dalits. Most Telugu Christians are Protestant, belonging to major Indian Protestant denominations such as the predominant Anglican Church of South India, Pentecostals such as Assemblies of God in India, India Pentecostal Church of God, The Pentecostal Mission, the Andhra Evangelical Lutheran Church, the Samavesam of Telugu Baptist Churches Bible Mission the Salvation Army and several others. There also is a significant number of Catholics and Evangelicals. The first Protestant missionaries in Andhra Pradesh were Cran and Des Granges who were sent out by the London Missionary Society. They set up their station at Visakhapatnam in 1805 AD.

The mother tongue of Telugu Christians is Telugu, the most widely spoken Dravidian language in India. However, with mission schools being the first to teach using English as the primary medium, English is widely used among Telugu Christian communities for both religious and secular purposes. Most major churches offer religious services in both Telugu and English. Some churches such as St. John's Church, Secunderabad and St. George's Church, Hyderabad offer services exclusively in English. English is also the preferred lingua franca of urban Christian youth.

The music of Telugu Christians consists mostly of hymns. The Andhra Kraistava Keerthanalu (Andhra Christian Hymnal) is the single most important collection of hymns used in Telugu Christian congregations. It includes translations of English Hymns and original hymns written in Telugu by famous hymnists such as Purushottam Chaudhary, John Bethala and the likes. Most of these Telugu Christian songs are set to the ragaas used in the Indian classical music.

=== Buddhism ===
Buddhism spread to Andhra Pradesh early in its history. The Krishna river valley was "a site of extraordinary Buddhist activity for almost a thousand years." The ancient Buddhist sites in the lower Krishna valley, including Amaravati, Nagarjunakonda and Jaggayyapeta "can be traced to at least the third century BCE, if not earlier."

The region played a central role in the development of Mahayana Buddhism, along with the Magadha-area in northeastern India. A. K. Warder holds that "the Mahāyāna originated in the south of India and almost certainly in the Andhra country." According to Xing, "Several scholars have suggested that the Prajnaparamita probably developed among the Mahasamghikas in Southern India probably in the Andhra country, on the Krishna River." The Prajñāpāramitā Sutras belong to the earliest Mahayana Sutras.

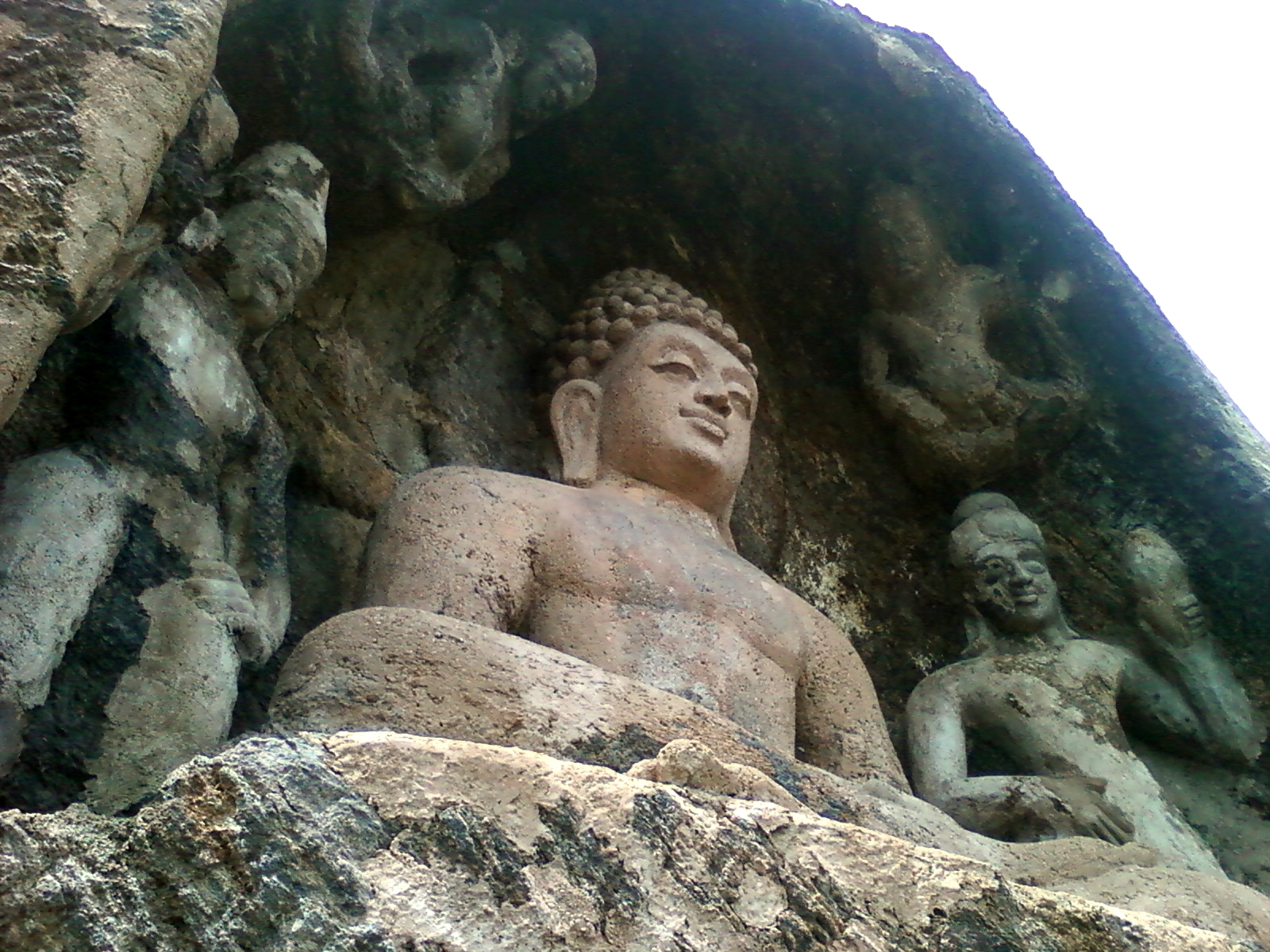
Rock-cut Buddha statue at Bojjannakonda near Anakapalle, Visakhapatnam

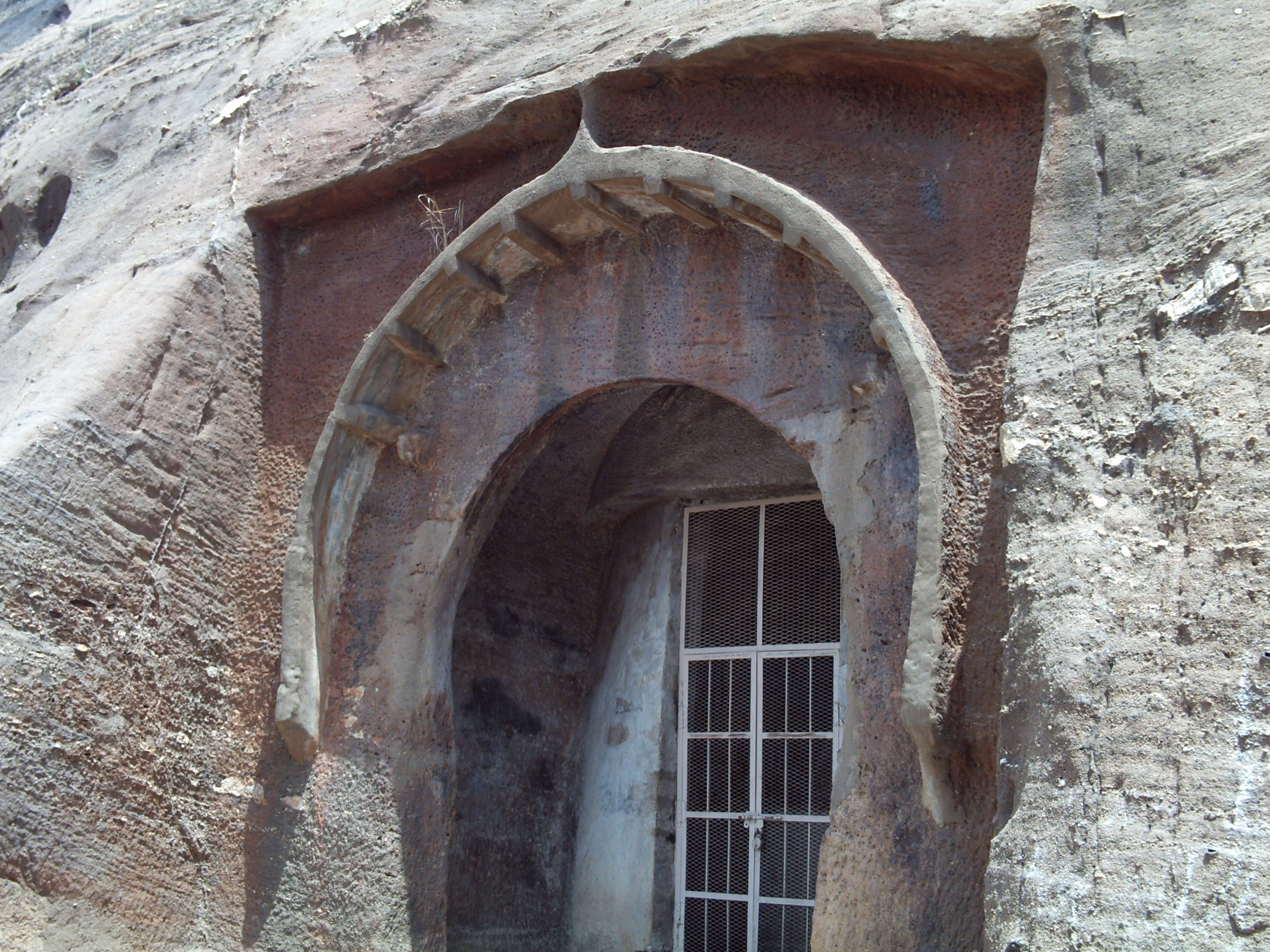
Entrance to the chaitya hall at Guntupalli Buddhist Monument near Eluru

=== Sikhism ===
The Sikhs comprise Banjara and Satnami. The process of blending the religion into southern India for the Sikligars began at the time of 10th Sikh Guru Gobind Singh, who came to the Deccan and died in 1708 at Nanded (Maharashtra).

It all came by the Sikligars as they came to southern India as expert arms-making camp followers of the tenth Guru. Sikligar is a compound of the Persian words saiqal and gar meaning a polisher of metal. The traditional occupation of the Sikligars is crafting kitchen implements.

=== Jainism ===
The Jaina tradition is that Mahavira himself had come to the north-eastern borders of Andhra Pradesh and preached the religion. There is a tradition (that Samprati, the grandson of Asoka (aśoka), sent Jaina monks to Andhra in the capacity as his ambassadors, after instructing the people how to treat them. The Hāthīgumphā inscription of Kharavela (kharavēla), written in Mauryan year 165 (2nd century B.C.), says that the idol of the Jina

Kundakunda[ acharya (c. 1st century A.D.) is one of the greatest savants of South Indian Jainism. According to tradition, he belonged to the hill-tracts of Anantapur. According to another tradition, Simha-nandi, a Jaina monk, who lived in Pēr-ūr in Andhra Pradesh, helped two Ikṣvāku princes, Dāḍiga and Mādhava, to carve a kingdom of their own, which later came to be known as the Ganga (gaṅga) kingdom.

== Demographics ==
Religion	1991		2001		2011	
Religion	pop	%	pop	%	pop	%
Hinduism	36,686,303	90.77	41,205,703	91.12	45,059,944	90.89
Islam	2,767,839	6.85	3,133,643	6.93	3,620,846	7.30
Christianity	936,970	2.32	797,544	1.76	684,586	1.38
Jainism	17,070	0.04	21,887	0.05	27,159	0.05
Sikhism	3,867	0.01	7,177	0.02	9,904	0.02
Buddhism	769	0.00	2,409	0.01	4,139	0.01
Others	964	0.00	1,686	0.00	4,572	0.01
Not stated	5152	0.01	52,687	0.12	165,953	0.33
Total	40,418,934		45,222,736		49,577103	

== See also ==
- Buddhapad Hoard
- List of festivals in Andhra Pradesh
