= Pranhita Wildlife Sanctuary =

Wildlife sanctuary in Gadchiroli district, Maharashtra, India

- IUCN category IV (habitat/species management area)
- Location within Maharashtra Location within India
- Interactive map of Pranhita Wildlife Sanctuary
- Location: Gadchiroli district, Maharashtra, India
- Nearest city: Gadchiroli
- Coordinates: 19.80°N 80.15°E
- Area: 418.85 km^{2} (161.72 sq mi)
- Designation: Wildlife sanctuary
- Established: 27 August 2014
- Governing body: Forest Department, Government of Maharashtra

Pranhita Wildlife Sanctuary is a wildlife sanctuary located in the Gadchiroli district of the Indian state of Maharashtra. The sanctuary was notified by the Government of Maharashtra on 27 August 2014 under the provisions of the Wildlife (Protection) Act, 1972 and covers an area of approximately 418.85 km^{2}. It lies along the Pranahita River, a major tributary of the Godavari River, and forms a contiguous ecological landscape with the Pranahita Wildlife Sanctuary in the neighbouring state of Telangana.

The sanctuary forms part of the Eastern Vidarbha landscape and plays an important role in maintaining habitat connectivity between protected areas across Maharashtra and Telangana.

== History ==
Pranhita Wildlife Sanctuary was notified in 2014 as part of the Maharashtra government's initiative to expand the protected area network in eastern Vidarbha. The sanctuary encompasses forest tracts primarily in the Aheri and Sironcha talukas of Gadchiroli district and was established to conserve dry deciduous forests, riverine habitats, and wildlife populations along the Pranhita River, which also forms the inter-state boundary between Maharashtra and Telangana.

== Geography and habitat ==
The sanctuary is situated in eastern Maharashtra within the Pranhita River basin and comprises gently undulating terrain with southern tropical dry deciduous forests interspersed with riparian vegetation. The river and associated streams provide perennial water sources and contribute to the ecological continuity of the forest landscape across state boundaries.

== Flora and fauna ==
Pranhita Wildlife Sanctuary is characterised by southern tropical dry deciduous forests dominated by teak (Tectona grandis), bamboo, and associated dry-deciduous tree and shrub species typical of eastern Vidarbha. Riverine vegetation along the Pranhita River supports grasses, reeds, and riparian plant communities that provide important habitat and water resources for wildlife.

The sanctuary supports a variety of mammal species including tiger (Panthera tigris), leopard (Panthera pardus), sloth bear (Melursus ursinus), wild dog or dhole (Cuon alpinus), nilgai (Boselaphus tragocamelus), sambar deer (Rusa unicolor), chital (Axis axis), wild boar (Sus scrofa), Indian porcupine (Hystrix indica), langur, and smaller carnivores. The forest and riverine habitats also sustain diverse birdlife, reptiles, and amphibians associated with dry deciduous and riparian ecosystems.

== Management and conservation ==
The sanctuary is administered by the Maharashtra Forest Department and is managed for wildlife conservation, habitat protection, and mitigation of human–wildlife conflict. Its location within the Eastern Vidarbha landscape makes it significant for maintaining wildlife corridors, particularly for large carnivores dispersing between Maharashtra and Telangana. Conservation measures include habitat management, anti-poaching activities, and regulation of development within and around the protected area.

== See also ==
- Pranahita Wildlife Sanctuary (Telangana)
- Wan Wildlife Sanctuary
