= Pushkaram =

Indian river worship festival

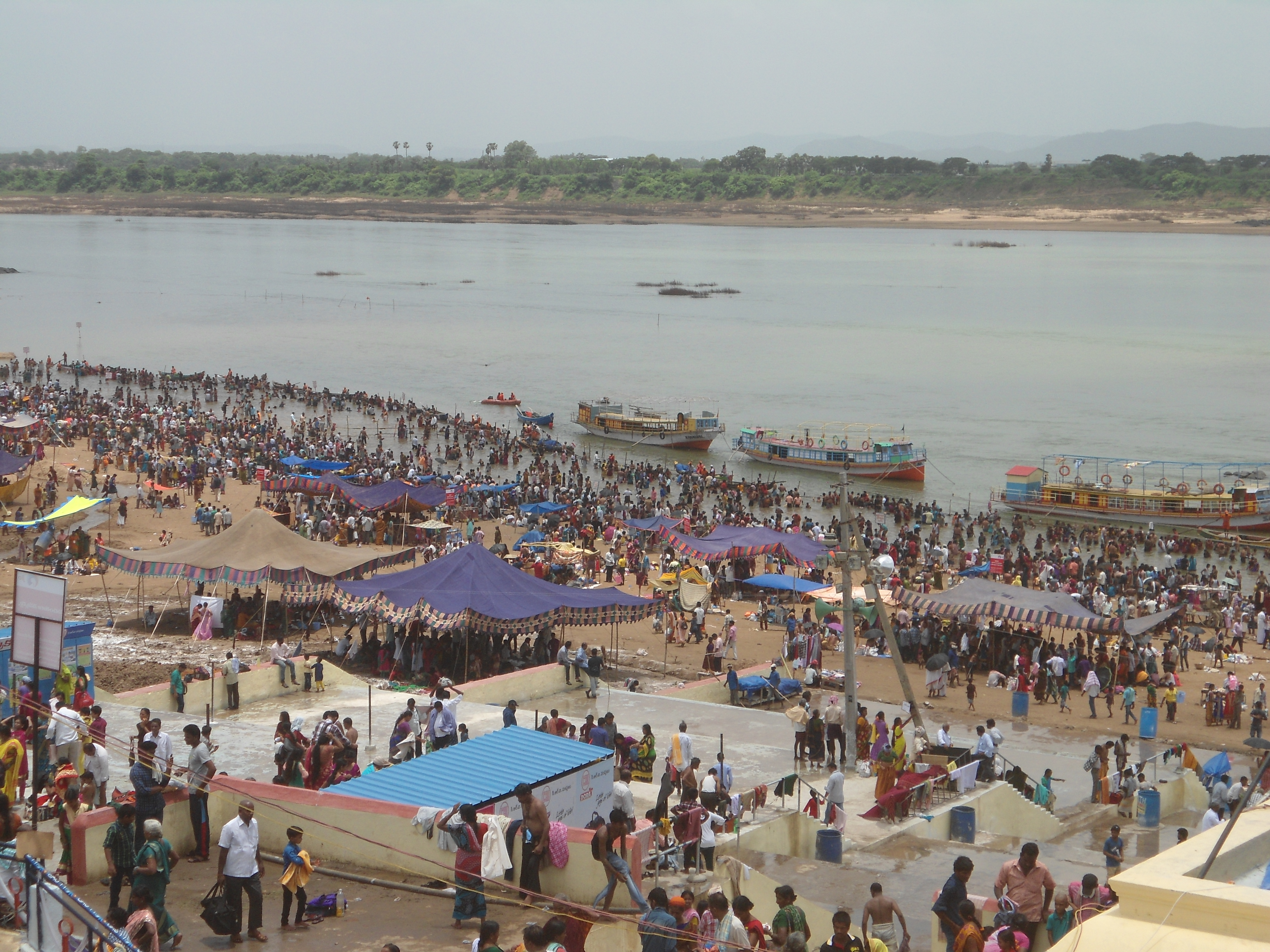
Godavari Pushkaram at Bhadrachalam, 2015

Pushkaram is an Indian festival dedicated to worshiping of rivers. It is also known as Pushkaralu (in Telugu), Pushkara (in Kannada) or Pushkar.

It is celebrated at shrines along the banks of 12 major sacred rivers in India, in the form of ancestor worship, spiritual discourses, devotional music and cultural programmes. The celebration happens annually, once in 12 years along each river. Each river is associated with a zodiac sign, and the river for each year's festival is based on which sign Jupiter is in at the time. Due to regional variations, some of the zodiac signs are associated with multiple rivers.

== Tradition ==
According to a legend mentioned in astrology treatises such as Jataka Parijata (1426), a Brahmin was granted a boon by Shiva after severe penance. The boon was that he would be able to live in water and purify the holy rivers. The Brahmin came to be known as Pushkara ("the one who nourishes"). On a request from Bṛhaspati (Jupiter), he decided to enter one of the 12 sacred rivers when Bṛhaspati traveled from one zodiac sign to another.

== The rivers ==
Each river is associated with a zodiac sign, and the river for each year's festival is based on which zodiac sign the planet Jupiter (Bṛhaspati) is in at that time. There are periods when Jupiter is in retrograde motion, resulting in entry into the same Zodiac sign twice in a year. On such occasions, the second entry of Jupiter is reckoned for celebrating the first part of the festival.

The Pushkaram tradition is not mentioned in the early Hindu texts; it is part of the medieval Hindu astrological lore. Therefore, the names of 12 rivers may vary depending on the regional traditions. For example, in Maharashtra, Bhima is associated with Scorpio sign, while in Tamil Nadu, Tamraparni is associated with it. The sacred rivers include:

#	Rashi (Hindu zodiac sign)	Corresponding Western zodiac sign	River	Next Pushkaram
1	Mesha	Aries	Ganga; Ganga Pushkaram	April 22 - May 5, 2023
2	Vrishabha	Taurus	Narmada; Narmada Pushkaram	May 1-13, 2024
3	Mithuna	Gemini	Saraswati; Sarasvati Pushkaram	May 15–26, 2025
4	Karka	Cancer	Yamuna; Yamuna Pushkaram	June 2–13, 2026
5	Simha	Leo	Godavari; Godavari Pushkaram	July 27 - August 03, 2027
6	Kanya	Virgo	Krishna, Krishna in Telangana and Andhra Pradesh; Krishna Pushkaralu In Tamil Nadu, the festival is celebrated at the Sangu Theertham tank at Vedagiriswarar temple.	August 12–23, 2028
7	Tula	Libra	Kaveri; Kaveri Pushkaram	September 12–23, 2029
8	Vrishchika	Scorpio	Bhima, Bhima in Maharashtra, Karnataka, Telangana; Bhima Pushkaram and Tamraparni river in Tamil Nadu.	October 12–23, 2018
9	Dhanus	Sagittarius	Tapti, (Pushkaravahini); Tapti Pushkaravahini In Assam, the festival is celebrated on the banks of Brahmaputra river.	March 29 - April 9, 2019
10	Makara	Capricorn	Tungabhadra; Tungabhadra Pushkaralu	November 20 - December 1, 2020
11	Kumbha	Aquarius	Sindhu (Indus); Sindhu Pushkaram	April 6–17, 2021
12	Mina	Pisces	Pranhita (Parineeta); Pranahita Pushkaralu	April 13–24, 2022

== Celebrations ==
Pushkaram celebrations include reverence of ancestors, spiritual discourses, devotional music and cultural programmes. The devotees engage in activities such as snana (bath in the river), dāna (charity), japa (recitation of mantras), archana and dhyana (meditation).

Theoretically, the festival lasts as long as Jupiter remains in the corresponding zodiac sign (generally, for one year). However, it draws major crowds only during the first 12 days. The first 12 days when the Jupiter enters the zodiac sign and the last 12 days when it exits the zodiac sign are considered as most auspicious. A dip in the sacred river is believed to erase all sins. The first twelve days are known as Adi Pushkaram, and the last twelve days are called Anthya Pushkaram. It is believed that during the above period of twenty-four days, "Pushkar", imbued with the power to make any river holy, will travel with Jupiter as Jupiter moves from one Zodiac house to another. Planets that fall in the "Pushkara navamsa" or "Puskara bhaga" of a birthchart are considered to be very beneficial and auspicious in jyotish astrology.

In Telugu-speaking states of Andhra Pradesh and Telangana, Pushkaralu are celebrated for Godavari, Krishna, Tungabhadra, Pranahita and Bhima (near Bhima-Krishna Sangam) rivers. The major towns and cities to easily reach out by train and extensive bus services for pushkaralu in Telugu states are Godavari: Rajahmundry (Airport also), Bhadrachalam, Mancherial, Basara; Krishna: Vijayawada/Amaravati (Airport also), Nagarjuna Sagar, Srisailam, Beechupalli, Repalle; Tungabhadra: Mantralayam, Kurnool, Alampur; Pranahita: Kaleshwaram-Sironcha (of Maharashtra), Korisini, and Vemanpally; Bhima: Khalhalli. All these places can be reached by direct bus services from Hyderabad and all local district headquarters.

In Tamil Nadu, Pushkaram is celebrated in Tamraparni River when Jupiter is in Scorpio. In the four places where River Tamraparni flows from south to north, Banathirtham, Papanasam, Thirupudaimaruthur and Sinthupoondurai, the festival is celebrated in accordance with tradition. The Tamraparni temple at Suthamalli is also a place of religious celebration during the Pushkaram year.

== See also ==
- Kumbh Mela
- Godavari Maha Pushkaram
- Krishna Pushkaram
