= Tungabhadra Pushkaralu =

Hindu river festival in India

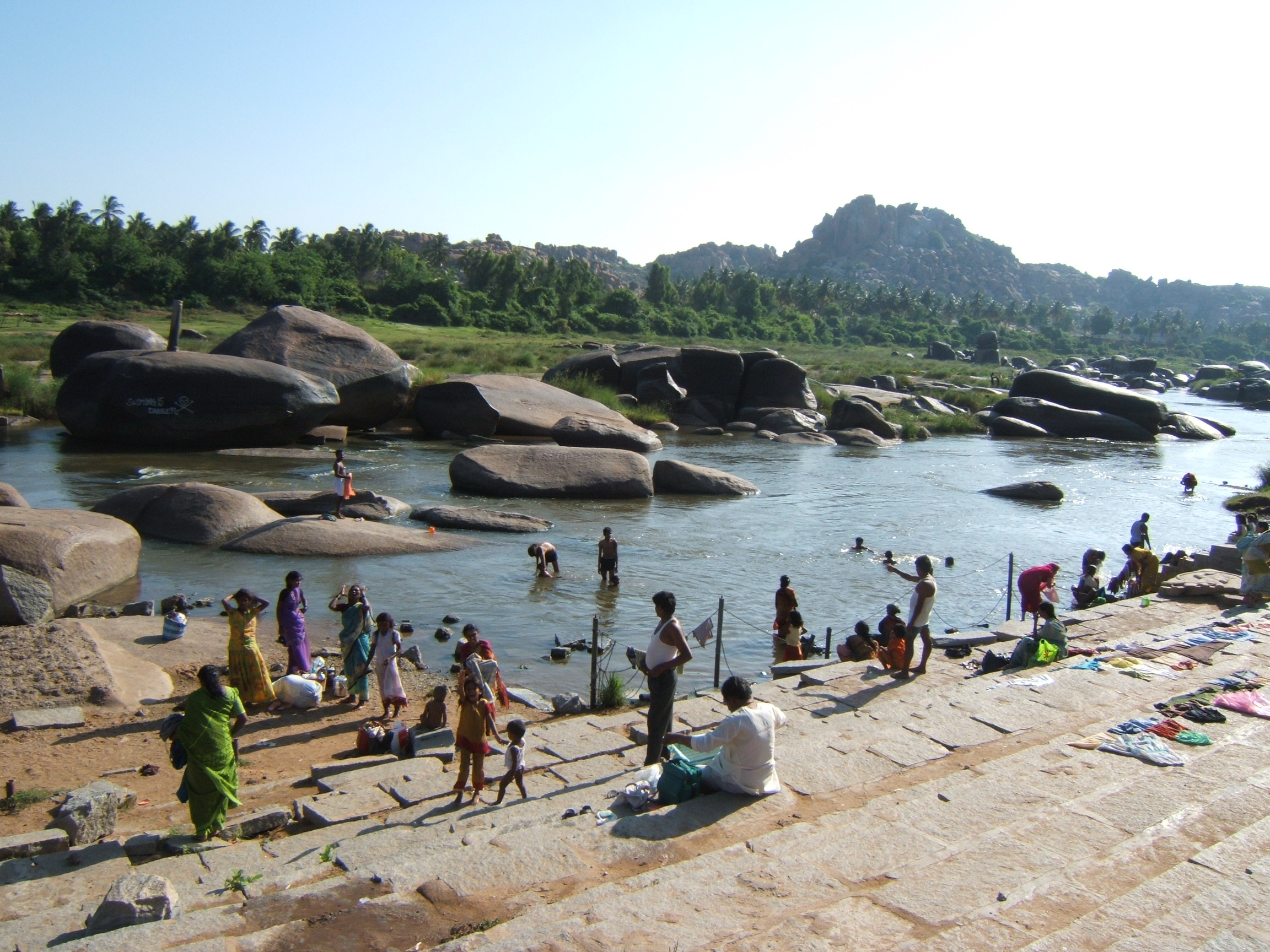
- Tungabhadra River in Hampi
- Status: Active
- Genre: Hindu festivals
- Begins: 20 Nov 2020
- Ends: 1 Dec 2020
- Frequency: every 12 years
- Venue: List of Major Ghats: Hospet; Hampi; Kampli; Mantralayam; Kurnool; Alampur
- Location: Tungabhadra River
- Country: India
- Previous event: 9 December 2008
- Next event: 2032
- Participants: 1 Crore
- Area: Karnataka, Andhra Pradesh, Telangana
- Budget: Rs. 125 crores
- Major events: Holy river dip and worship at the temples on the banks of the river

Tungabhadra Pushkaram is a festival of River Tungabhadra normally occurs once in 12 years. This Pushkaram is observed for a period of 12 days from the time of entry of Jupiter into Makara rasi (Capricorn).

== Details of locations ==
The places on the banks of the Tungabhadra River where pilgrims visit famous temples are in the Alampur, Jogulamba Gadwal district of Telangana and Kurnool district of Andhra Pradesh. The notable places are Hospet, Hampi, Kampli, Mantralayam, Kurnool, and Alampur.

== See also ==
- Godavari Pushkaralu
- Kumbh Mela
- Pushkaram
