= Bhima Pushkaram =

- Genre: Hindu festivals
- Frequency: every 12 years
- Location: Bhima River
- Country: India
- Next event: October 12 - 23, 2018
- Major events: Holy Bath

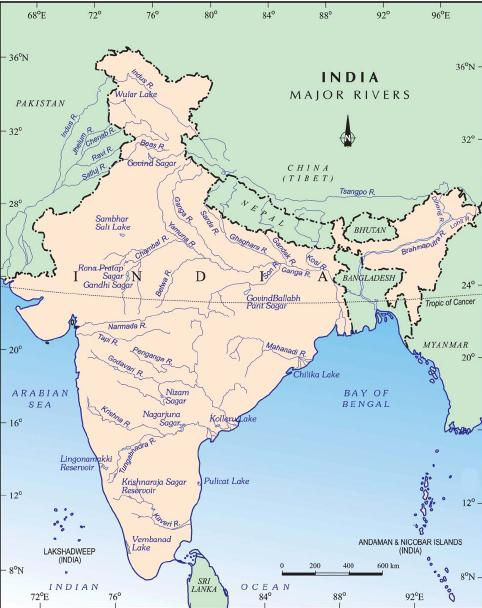
Course of the River through the South Indian Peninsula

The Bhima Pushkaram is the Pushkaram river festival organized on the banks of the Bhima river. It is a Hindu festival, organized once every 12 years. Thousands of people dive in to take a bath as worship. The Rashi or the Hindu zodiac sign for this river is Vrishchika or Scorpio.
