= Pranahita River =

River in India

Pranahita ప్రాణహిత प्राणहिता
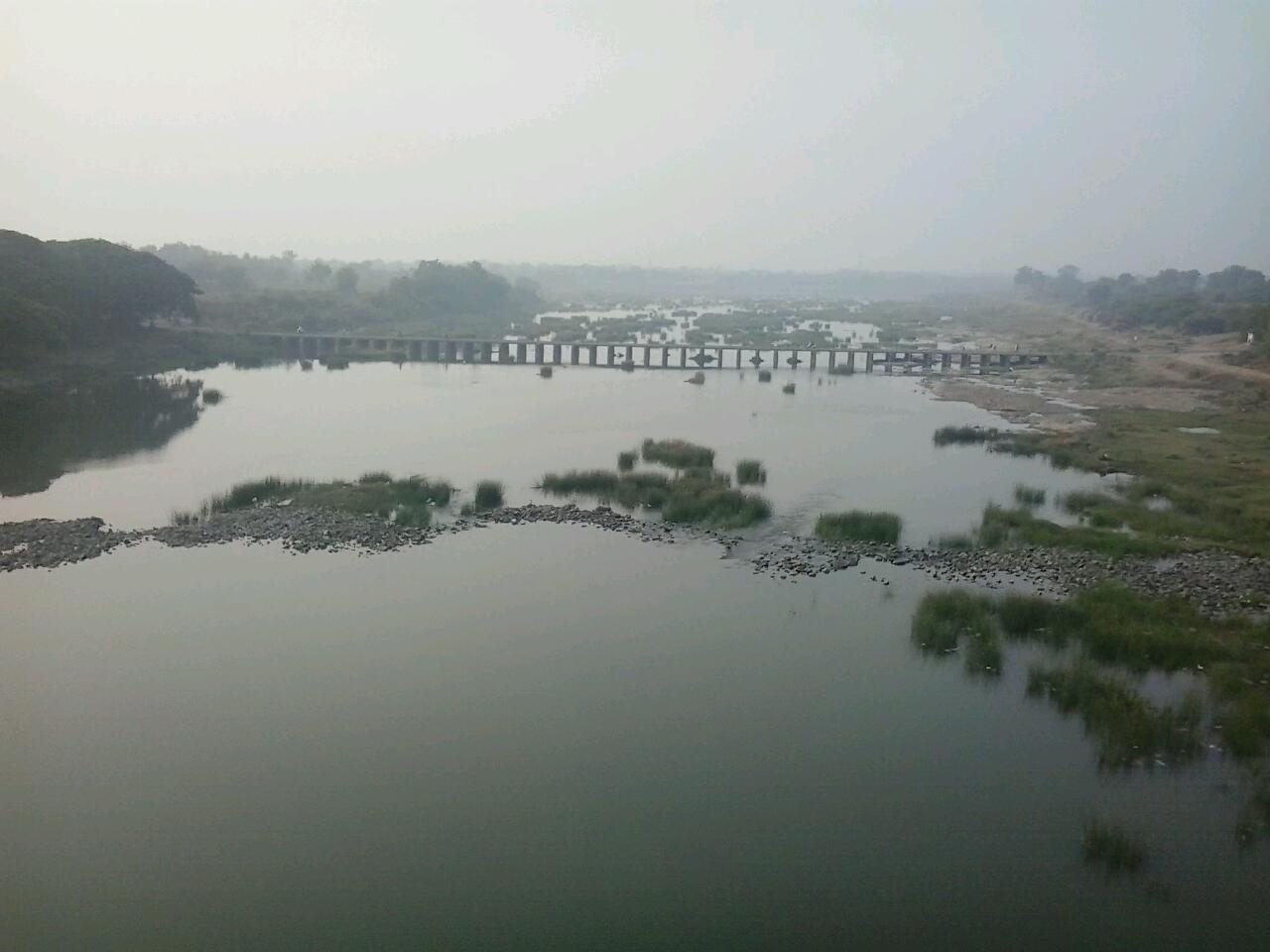
- Native name: ప్రాణహిత (Telugu)

Location
- Country: India
- State: Maharashtra, Telangana
- Districts: Gadchiroli District, Komaram Bheem Asifabad district, Mancherial district
- Town: Sirpur , Kaleshwaram, Sironcha

Physical characteristics
- Source: Confluence of Wardha and Wainganga
  - location: Koutala, Telangana, India
  - coordinates: 19°35′24″N 79°47′59″E
  - elevation: 146 m (479 ft)
- Mouth: Godavari River
  - location: Kaleshwaram, Telangana
  - coordinates: 18°49′30″N 79°54′36″E
  - elevation: 107 m (351 ft)
- Length: 113 km (70 mi)
- Basin size: 109,078 km^{2} (42,115 sq mi)

Basin features
- Tributaries
  - left: Dina River
  - right: Nagulvagu River, Peddawagu River

The Pranahita River is the largest tributary of Godavari River covering about 34% of its drainage basin conveying the combined waters of the Penganga River, the Wardha River, and the Wainganga River. By virtue of its extensive network of tributaries, the river drains a large part of Vidarbha region in Maharashtra, as well as the southern slopes of the Satpura Range in southeast Madhya Pradesh. It flows along the border of Gadchiroli district in Maharashtra and Komaram Bheem Asifabad district,Mancherial district in Telangana. The Pranahita sub-basin is the seventh largest in India, measuring about 109,078 km^{2}, making it larger than the individual basins of significant rivers such as the Narmada River and Kaveri.

== Origin ==
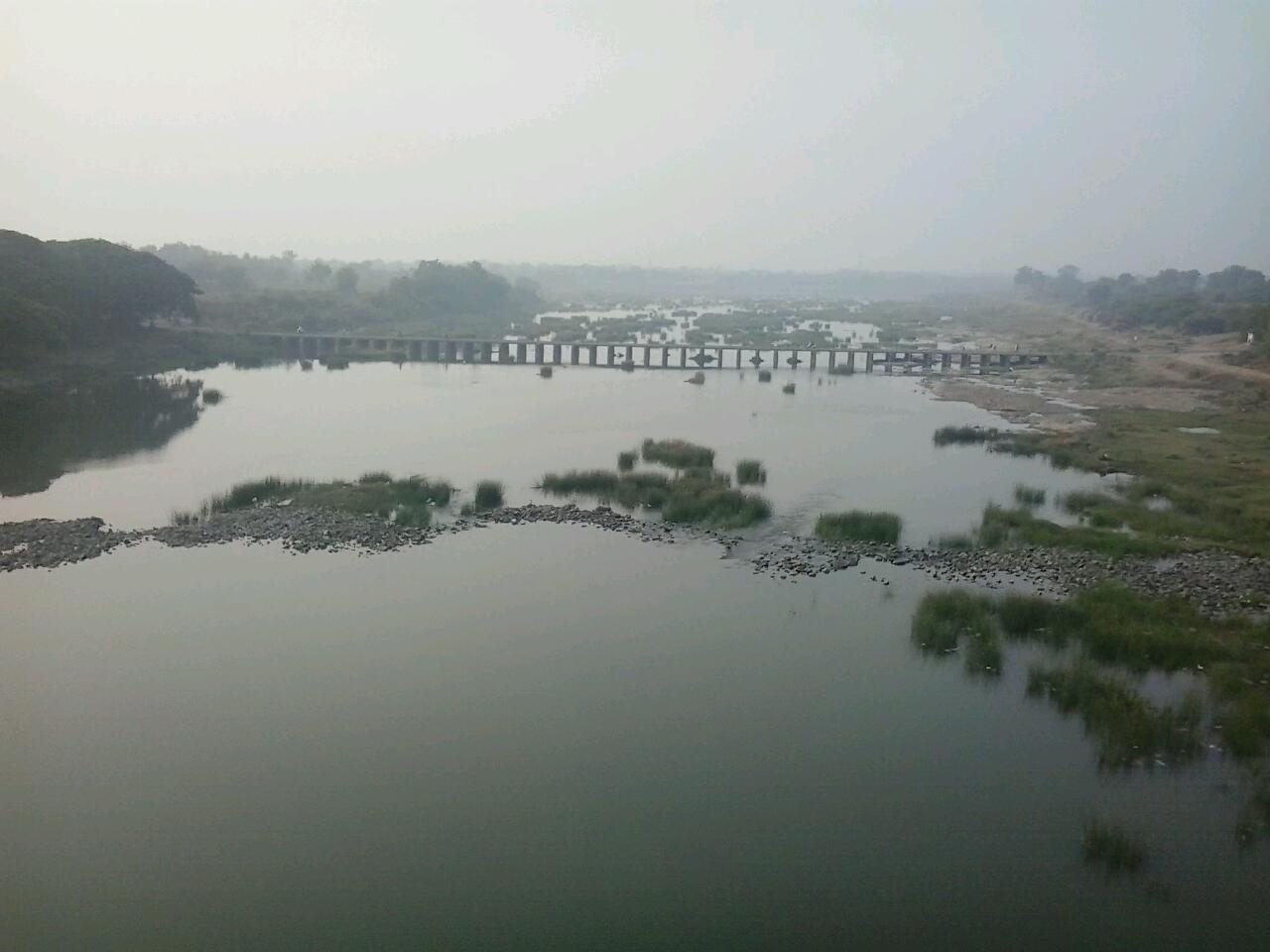
Wardha river at Pulgaon

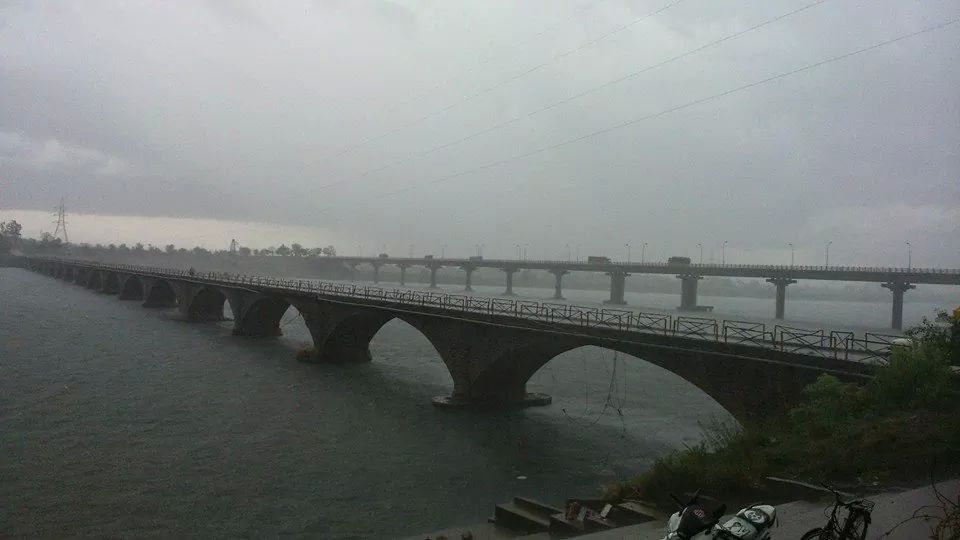
Wainganga River in Bhandara City

The Pranahita River begins at the confluence of two extensive rivers: the Wardha (catchment area: 46,237 km^{2}) and the Wainganga (catchment area: 49,677 km^{2}). This junction lies on the border between the states of Maharashtra and Telangana near Tumdi Hettty, Kouthala Mandal (near Sirpur (T)). Right at the onset, the river enjoys a wide riverbed.

== Course ==
The Pranahita River follows a short course of 113 kilometers, strictly adhering to the boundary between Gadchiroli district in Maharashtra and Komaram Bheem Asifabad, Mancherial, Jayashankar Bhupalapally districts in Telangana. The direction of flow is southward, unlike most rivers of the Deccan Plateau. Along its course, the river is flanked by thick forests and harbors rich biodiversity of flora and fauna. After completing its short journey, the river empties itself into the Godavari River at Kaleshwaram.

== Dams ==
The Pranahita River currently does not have any dams built on it. However, a water project to construct a barrage is currently underway. This project, the Kaleshwaram Lift Irrigation Project, has an estimated cost of Rs. 38,500 crore and is a project the Indian state of Telangana.

== Uses ==
The River is used for water transport between Sironcha and Kaleshwaram. It is also one of twelve rivers in the Pushkaram, a festival in Hindu traditions. The pushkaram on Pranahita (pranati) will held immediate after Sindhu river pushkaram, Pranahita river pushkaram assign with zodiac of Mena (pisces).

== Wildlife ==
There are 2 wildlife sanctuaries on the river- Pranahita Wildlife Sanctuary in Telangana and Pranhita Wildlife Sanctuary in Maharastra.
