= Kaleshwara Mukteswara Swamy Temple =

Hindu temple in Telangana, India

Kaleshwara Mukteeshwara Swamy Temple
- Kaleshwara Mukteswara Swamy Temple, Mahadevpur Mandal

Religion
- Affiliation: Hinduism
- District: Bhoopalpally
- Deity: Shiva

Location
- State: Telangana
- Country: India
- Interactive map of Kaleshwara Mukteeshwara Swamy Temple
- Coordinates: 18.811821°N 79.904026°E

Architecture
- Type: Dravidian

Kaleshwara Mukteeshwara Swamy Temple is a Hindu temple located in Kaleshwaram, Bhoopalpally, Telangana, India.

== Deity ==
It is the site of a temple of the Hindu god Shiva. The temple is significant because of the two Shiva Lingas that are found on a single pedestal. These Linga are named Lord Shiva and Lord Yama. Collectively, they known as Kaleshwara Mukteeshwara Swamy. Kaleshwaram is one of three Shiva temples mentioned in Trilinga Desham, or "Land of Three Lingas."

== Pilgrims ==
The holy place draws tourists during the Karthika Month of the Indian Calendar, 16 November – 15 December. Holy baths are held during 6–17 December. People who bathe here first visit Lord Ganesha, then pray to Lord Yama and then to Lord Shiva.

== Darshan ==
The temple is open from 6:30 a.m.-1:30 p.m. and 4:00-6:00 p.m.

Access to Laksha Bilwapatri Pooja is by request to Dewasthanam officials at least one month in advance.

Two types of prasadam are inside the temple: Pulihora (Tamarind rice) and Laddu (sweet). This place is very popular for after funeral events like kashi. People believe that this is second kashi in India.
