= Krishna Pushkaram =

Indian festival

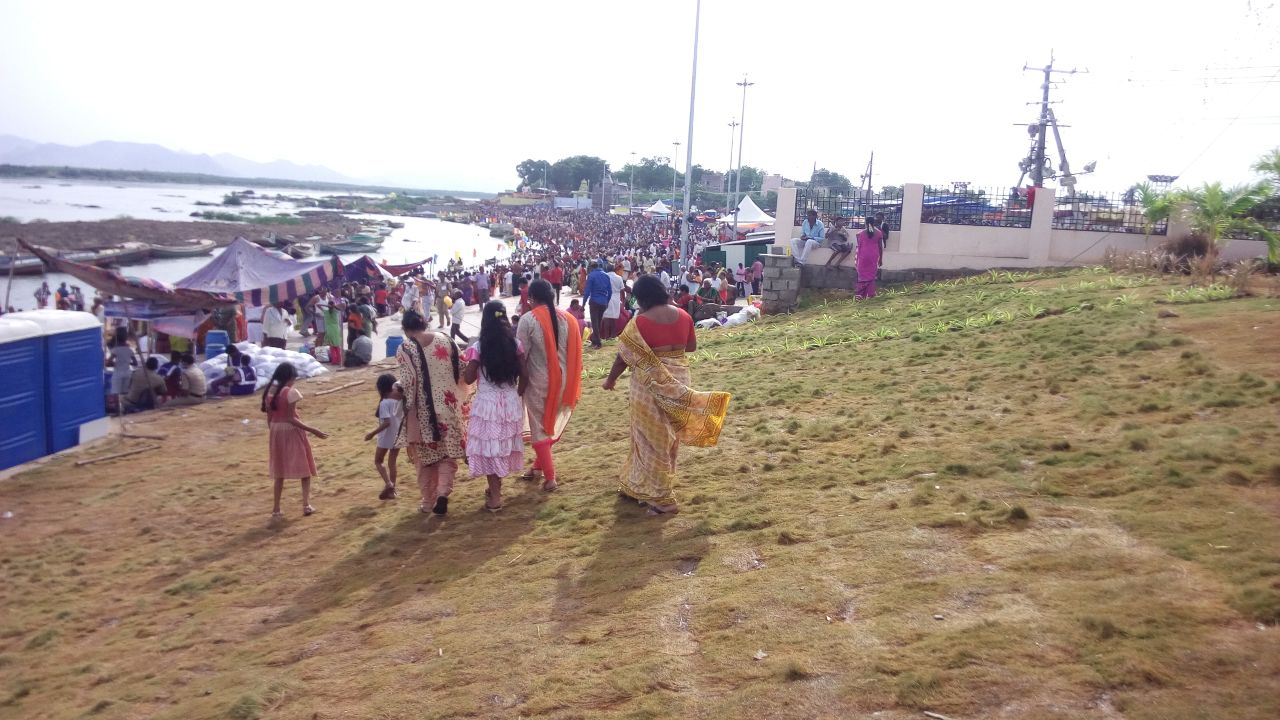
- Also called: Krishna River Pushkaram
- Observed by: Hindus and followers of Hinduism
- Type: Hindu
- Significance: Worship of the Krishna River
- Celebrations: Prayer along the riverbanks, bathing in the holy water of the river
- Begins: 12 August 2028
- Ends: 23 August 2028
- Duration: 12 days
- Frequency: Every 12 Years
- Started by: Hindu tradition in Rajasthan
- Related to: Pushkaralu

Krishna Pushkaram is a holy festival in Hinduism to worship the Krishna River, which is one of the 12 sacred rivers in India. The holy festival is observed in the banks along it, usually held in the form of fairs, praying halls, or Hindu temples with ghats along the river. The festivity normally occurs once in every 12 years and is celebrated with much glory due to its occurrence once every 12 years, and the holiness of the event. The duodecennial festival has over 50 million attendees during the 12 days, and many workplaces offer a break during the festival in regard of its importance.

The Pushkaram is observed for a period of 12 days from the time of entry of Jupiter into Virgo (Kanya rasi). The festival should theoretically be observed throughout the twelve months that the planet remains in that sign, but the first 12 days are considered most sacred as per the beliefs of worshippers. Pushkaram has been an age old practice in southern states Andhra Pradesh, Karnataka and Telangana. In 2016, the celebration started on 12 August and ended on 23 August.

== Temples of Observance ==
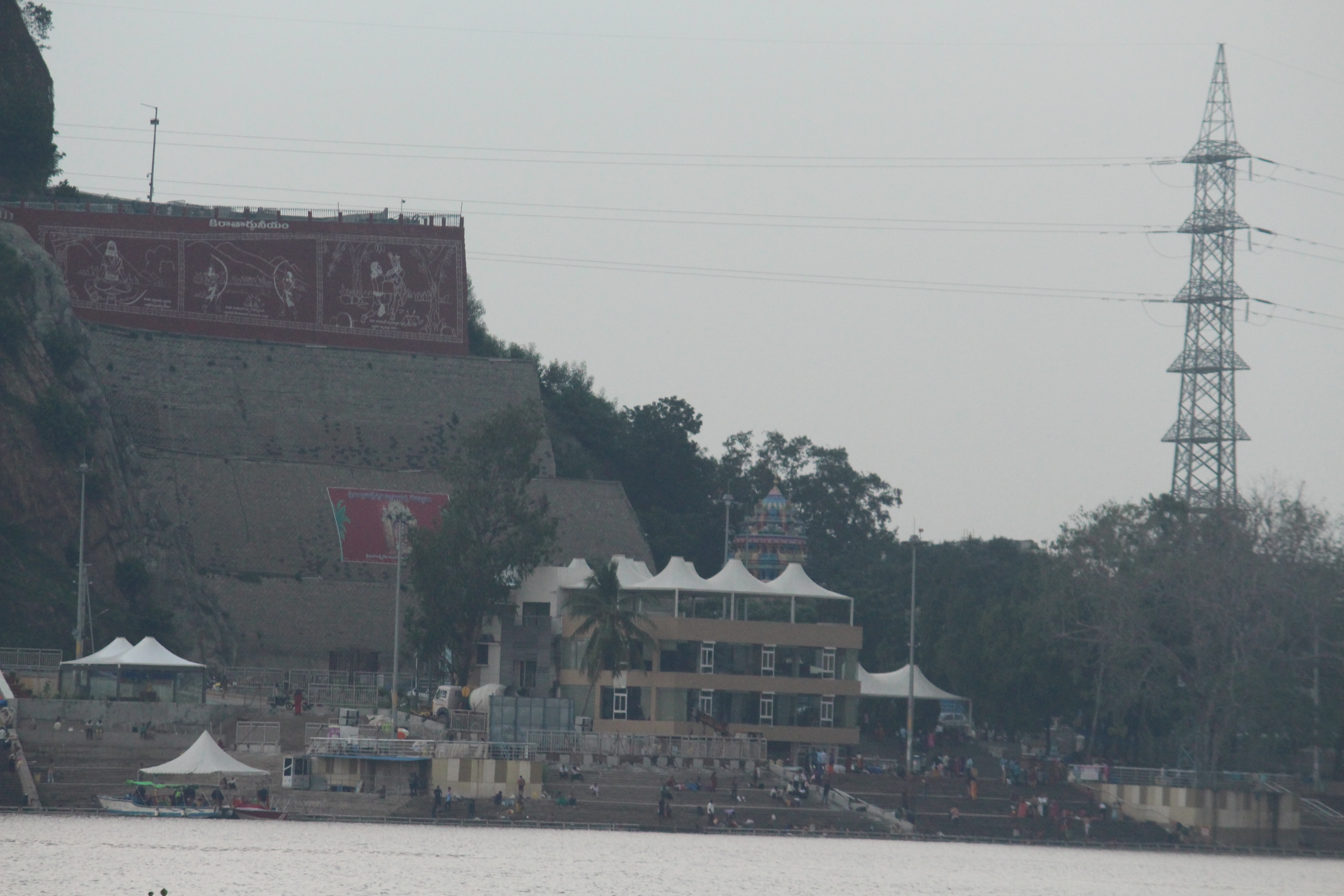
Pushkar Ghats at Vijayawada

The following is a list of Hindu temples that have a ghat (an entry into a river) or just ghats, which were built for public use.

Vijayawada: Padmavathi Ghat, Krishnaveni Ghat, Durga Ghat, Sithanagaram Ghat, Punnami Ghat, Bhavani Ghat, Pavithra Sangam (Ferry) Ghat

Amaravathi: Shivalayam Ghat, Dhyana Buddha Ghat, Dharanikota Ghat

Kurnool: Patala Ganga Ghat (Srisailam), Sangameswaram River Ghat

Gadwal: Mahaboob Nagar Juraala, Beechupally.

Karnataka: Chikodi (Bagalkot), Raichur (Krishna Taluk)
