= Kaleshwaram =

Kaleshwaram Kālēśwaraṁ
- ← Kaleshwaram (India)
- Coordinates: 18°48′41″N 79°54′24″E
- Country: India
- State: Telangana
- District: Bhupalpally

Government
  - Type: Village Panchayat
- Climatic: Tropical (Köppen)
- Precipitation: 995 millimetres (39.2 in)
- Avg. annual temperature: 31 °C (88 °F)
- Avg. summer temperature: 44 °C (111 °F)
- Avg. winter temperature: 20 °C (68 °F)

Kaleshwaram is a village in Mahadevpur Mandal in Jayashankar Bhupalpally district in the Indian state of Telangana. This name refers more broadly to the state of Telangana & Kaleshwaram Temple.

Kaleshwaram is at the juncture of the rivers Godavari and its Pranahita tributary. It is 277 kilometres from Hyderabad, 125 kilometres from Karimnagar, 130 kilometres from Warangal, 95 kilometres from Ramagundam railway station, 60 kilometres from Godavarikhani, 75 kilometres from Parkal and 60 kilometres from Manthani. This place is also popularly known as second Kashi or southern Indian Kashi. It is 10 km from Sironcha, Maharashtra.

== Legend ==
Legend claims that a long time ago, a Vaishya had performed an Abhisheka to Lord Kaleshwara Mukteeshwara with hundreds of milk pots, and the milk evolved at the sangamam of Godavari and Pranahita.

== Transport ==
Tsrtc Bus services are available from Hyderabad, Godavarikhani, Warangal, Parkal, Karimnagar, Gadchiroli, Sironcha, Aheri, Manthani, and Peddapalli. Mainly Godavarikhani, Bhupalpally, Manthani, Hanumakonda bus depots run buses.

== Theology ==
The name Kaleshwara indicates Kala (Who takes life(Death)) means Yama and Eshwara (who gives life) means Shiva. This is a rare combination as the Life and Death are at same place. which is strong evidence that Life and Death are not different, they are Same.

== Temple ==
Kaleshwara Mukteswara Swamy Temple, Mahadevpur Mandal

It is the site of a temple of the Hindu god Shiva. The temple is significant because of the two Shiva Lingas that are found on a single pedestal. These Linga are named Lord Shiva and Lord Yama. Collectively, they are known as Kaleshwara Mukteeshwara Swamy. Kaleshwaram is one of three Shiva temples mentioned in Trilinga Desham, or "Land of Three Lingas."

The holy place draws tourists during the Karthika Month of the Indian Calendar, 16 November – 15 December. Holy baths are held during 6–17 December. People who bathe here first visit Lord Ganesha, then pray to Lord Yama and then to Lord Shiva.

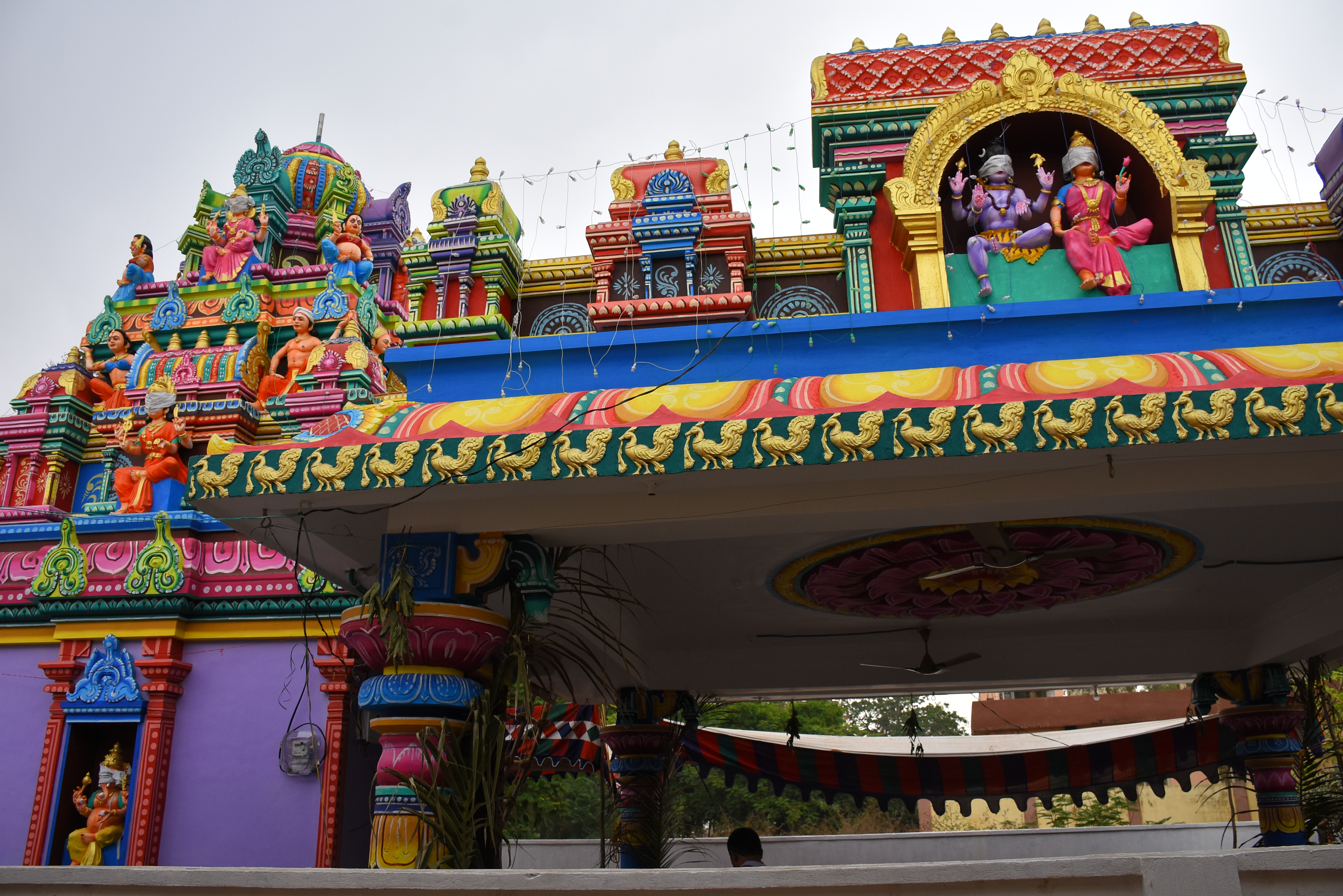
Vasavi kanyaka Parameshwari temple, Kaleshwaram

In 2018, Sri Vasavi Kanyaka Parameshwari temple was opened near Kaleshwara Mukteeshwara Swamy Temple. Adjacent to it was new Nitya Anna Dhana Vysya Satram. Temple is funded and built by Rajaiah and Satyavathi Devi Daram. Everyday rituals are being performed by Purohiths.

== Kaleshwaram Lift Irrigation Project ==
The Kaleshwaram Lift Irrigation Project is a major irrigation project that was started in 2016. The massive project is intended to meet the irrigation needs of nearly three-fourths of Telangana with its headworks taken up at a cost of ₹80,500 crore.

== Kaleshwaram ==
- Visit www.KaleshwaramTemple.in – Kaleshwaram Devasthanam – Sri Kaleshwara Muktheeshwara Devasthanam
- Visit https://traveltimings.in/hyderabad-kaleshwaram/ – For Hyderabad to Kaleshwaram Bus Timings – For Sri Kaleshwara Muktheeshwara Devasthanam
- The Kaleshwaram Lift Irrigation Project website
