= Godavari Maha Pushkaram =

Hindu festival held every 144 years

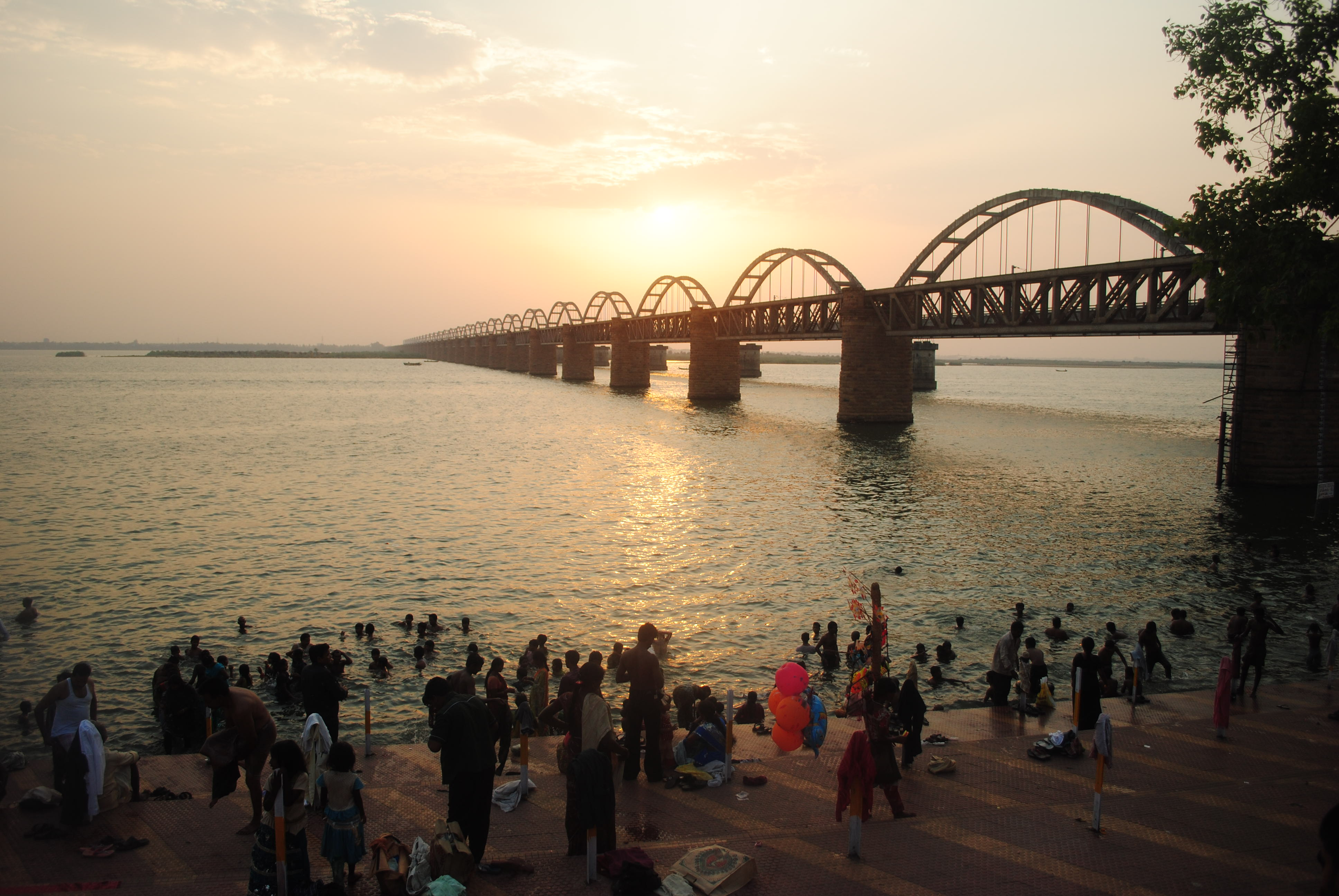
- Godavari River at sunset at Rajamahendravaram
- Genre: Hindu festivals
- Frequency: every 12 years; every 144 years (Maha Pushkaram)
- Venue: List of major ghats: Kotilingala; Kaleshwaram; Bhadrachalam; Dowleswaram; Rajamahendravaram; Kovvur; Narsapuram; Antarvedi
- Location: Godavari River
- Country: India
- Previous event: 14 August 2015
- Next event: 2027
- Participants: 110 million (64 million in Andhra Pradesh and 46 million in Telangana) (official)
- Area: Maharashtra, Telangana, Chhattisgarh, Andhra Pradesh
- Budget: INR 23 billion (in 2015)
- Major events: Holy river dip and worship at the temples on the banks of the river
- Website: godavarimahapushkaram.org

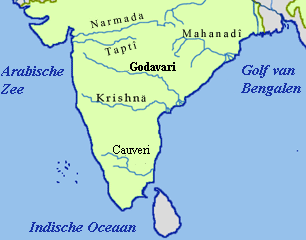
Course of the Godavari River through the South Indian Peninsula

Godavari Maha Pushkaram (lit. 'Great Worship of the Godavari River') was a Hindu festival held from 14 July to 25 July 2015. This festival occurs once every 144 years, corresponding to the 12th recurrence of the 12-year Godavari Pushkaram cycle.

The festival starts from the Ashadha (June/July in the Gregorian calendar) month on the Chaturdashi thithi (14th day), when planet Jupiter enters the zodiac sign Leo. The festival is "theoretically" observed throughout the twelve months that the planet remains in that sign, but the first 12 days are considered most sacred. The first 12 days of the Godavari Pushkaram are known as "Aadhi Pushkaram" and the last 12 days are titled "Anthya Pushkaralu". The next Maha Pushkaram will be celebrated in 2159.

At least 27 pilgrims, 13 of them women, died and 20 others were injured in a stampede at a major bathing spot on the banks of the Godavari river where a huge crowd of devotees had gathered on the opening day of 'Pushkaram' festival.

== Etymology ==
"Maha" means "great" and Pushkaram refers to the worship of the river in which the god Pushkar appears every 12 years. Pushakaram is spelled Pushkaralu in Telugu, Pushkaram in Tamil, Pushkara in Kannada, and Pushkar in Hindi.

== Background ==
Pushkaram is a Hindu festival dedicated to worshiping of 12 sacred rivers. The celebration happens annually, once in 12 years along each river. Each river is associated with a zodiac sign, and the river for each year's festival is based on which sign Bruhaspathi (Jupiter) is in at the time. It is believed that bathing in the sacred river during Pushkaram cleanses the devotees of their sins.

Godavari is one of the 12 sacred rivers, and the Godavari Pushkaram takes place once every 12 years, when the Jupiter is in the Leo sign. The Maha Pushkaram ("Great Pushkaram") takes place once every 144 years.

== Festival dates ==
The 2015 Godavari Pushkaram is believed to be a Maha Pushkaram, which happens once in 144 years. In 2015, Jupiter enters Leo on 14 July 2015 (Tuesday) at 6.26 am IST, when the Maha Pushkaram begins, and ends after 12 days on 25 July 2015 (Saturday).

Multiple almanac writers and other skeptics have disputed that the 2015 Godavari Pushkaram was a "Maha Pushkaram". According to Hanmanthavajjula Subrahmanya Sarma, the president of State Drukghanitha Almanac Writers’ Association, the "theory of 144 years is a myth", and nobody knows "who calculated it and how they calculated it".

== Details of locations ==
The places on the banks of the Godavari River where pilgrims visit famous temples are in the five districts of Telangana and Andhra Pradesh. The notable places are Manthani, Basar, Dharmapuri, Koti Lingala, Kaleshwaram and Bhadrachalam in Telangana and Rajamahendravaram, Kovvur, Narasapuram, Antarvedi in Andhra Pradesh.

== Facilities ==
The Maha Pushkaram festival in 2015 attracted 48.1 million people in Andhra Pradesh and 57 million people in the Telangana state link from all parts of India. On this occasion, it is essential to take a holy dip in the Godavari River to get the supposed benefits of better physical and mental abilities. The Governments of Andhra Pradesh and Telangana have made all arrangements for this event in their respective states by constructing ghats for bathing and improving roadways, basic amenities of water supply and sanitation, and security. In Andhra Pradesh. the budget allocated for improvement of infrastructure facilities was INR 12.95 billion.

== Symbolism ==
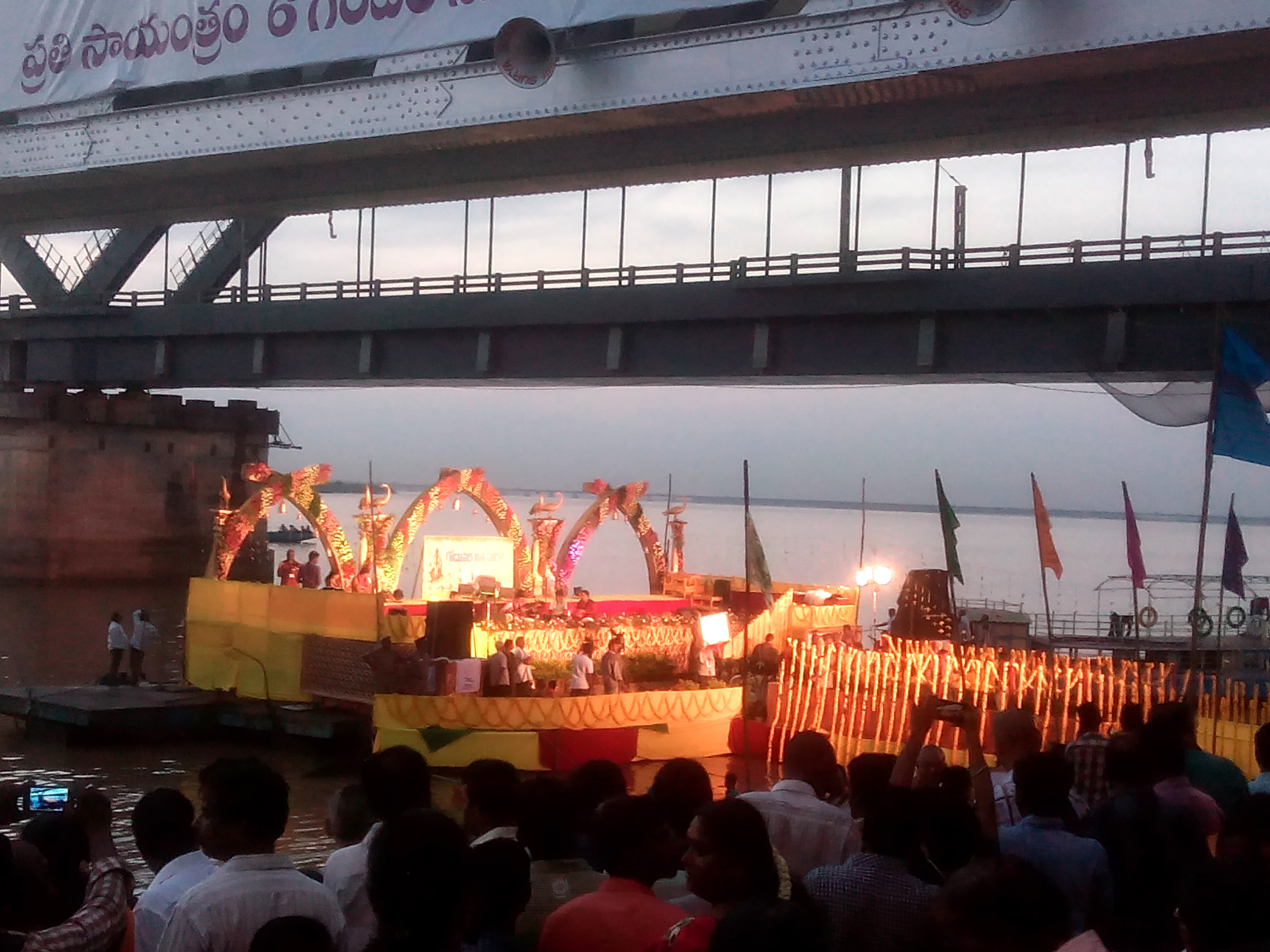
Stage of Godavari Harathi in Rajamundry

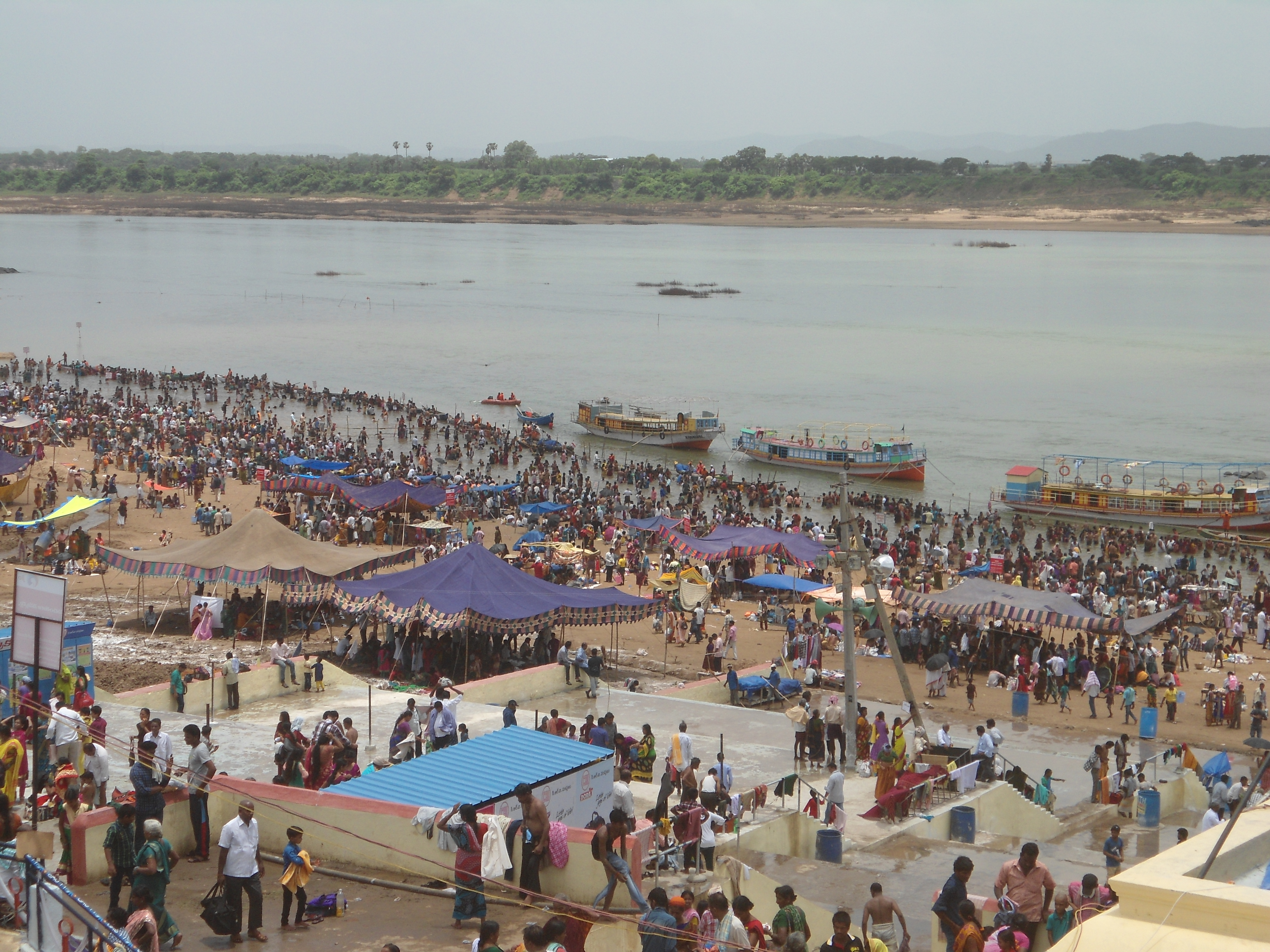
Devotees taking a holy dip at Bhadrachalam during Maha Pushkaram in 2015

An emblem titled "Godavari Maha Pushkaram 2015" and "Godavari Pushkaramalu" has been adopted by the state governments for this festival, and a special organization under the same name has also been instituted to address all issues related to the smooth functioning of the festive event. The emblem or logo with a simple design has lines to denote the rapid flow conditions of the Godavari River, a "jyoti" a glowing light, and the representation of offering oblation, called "Arghyam", to Surya, the Sun god.

Another symbolic event proposed during the festival is to hold "Sobha Yatra", a procession carrying the sacred waters of the Godavari River to be mixed with water bodies in all the villages in the 13 districts which lie within the ambit of the Godavari River.

A religious symbolic performance called the "Godavari Arathi", a ritual of worship with a number of lamps is also proposed to be held at Rajamahendravaram where the river flows out to the sea.

== See also ==
- List of largest gatherings in history
- Pushkaram

== Bibliography ==
- Dalal, Roshen (18 April 2014). Hinduism: An Alphabetical Guide. Penguin Books Limited. ISBN 978-81-8475-277-9.
- Pillai, L.D.S. (1 December 1996). Panchang and Horoscope. Asian Educational Services. ISBN 978-81-206-0258-8.
