= Bharatiya Janata Party – Telangana =

Telangana affiliate of the Bharatiya Janata Party

- President: N. Ramchander Rao
- Chairman: Alleti Maheshwar Reddy
- General Secretary: Sri Gujjula Premender Reddy ◽️Sri Dugyala Pradeep Rao ◽️Kum. Bangaru Shruthi ◽️Dr. Kasam Venkateshwarlu
- Founder: Atal Bihari Vajpayee; Lal Krishna Advani; Murli Manohar Joshi; Nanaji Deshmukh; K. R. Malkani; Sikandar Bakht; Vijay Kumar Malhotra; Vijaya Raje Scindia; Bhairon Singh Shekhawat; Shanta Kumar; Ram Jethmalani; Jagannathrao Joshi
- Founded: 6 April 1980 (46 years ago)
- Headquarters: Nampally, Hyderabad, Telangana
- Youth wing: Bharatiya Janata Yuva Morcha, Telangana
- Women's wing: BJP Mahila Morcha, Telangana
- Ideology: Integral humanism; Social conservatism; Economic liberalism; Hindu nationalism; Cultural nationalism
- Colours: Saffron
- Alliance: National Democratic Alliance
- Seats in Rajya Sabha: 0 / 7
- Seats in Lok Sabha: 8 / 17
- Seats in Telangana Legislative Council: 3 / 40
- Seats in Telangana Legislative Assembly: 7 / 119

Election symbol

Party flag
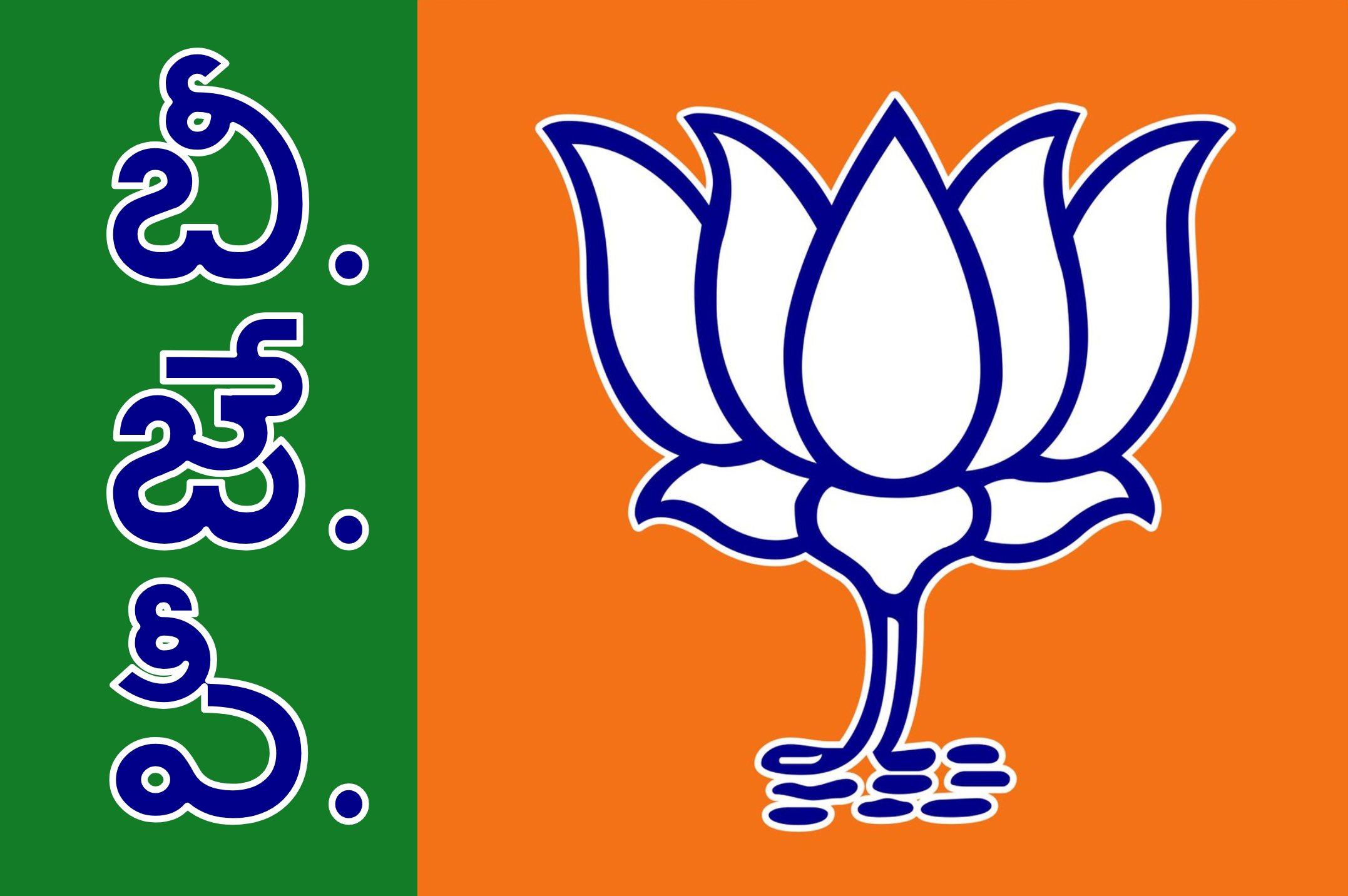

Website
- bjptelangana.org

The Bharatiya Janata Party – Telangana (BJP - Telangana) is the affiliate of the Bharatiya Janata Party in the Indian state of Telangana. The party is based in Hyderabad led by N. Ramchander Rao and he is the president of the BJP Telangana.

The party currently holds 8 seats in the Lok Sabha from the state. Furthermore, the party has 3 seats in the Telangana Legislative Council and 8 seats in the Telangana Legislative Assembly.

== History ==
After the formation of Telangana, the BJP in alliance with Telugu Desam Party fought the 2014 Legislative Assembly election. BJP won 5 seats in the newly formed Telangana Legislative Assembly. BJP also won a Lok Sabha seat from Secunderabad constituency in the simultaneously held 2014 Lok Sabha election.

In 2018, the state assembly was dissolved earlier than its term, and elections were held same year. BJP in this election could only secure 1 seat and its vote share was 7.10%. However, in the 2019 Lok Sabha BJP won 4 out of the 17 seats. The BJP got 19.45% of the total votes. In 2023 Telangana Legislative Assembly election the BJP won 8 seats with a vote share of 13.90%.In 2024 Indian general election in Telangana the BJP increased its tally to 8 and secured a vote share of 35.08%.

== Electoral Performance ==
=== Lok Sabha elections ===
The Lok Sabha, also known as the House of the People, is the lower house of the bicameral Parliament of India, where the upper house is Rajya Sabha. Members of the Lok Sabha are elected by an adult universal suffrage and a first-past-the-post system to represent their respective constituencies, and they hold their seats for five years or until the body is dissolved by the president of India on the advice of the Union Council of Ministers. The house meets in the Lok Sabha chamber of the Parliament House in New Delhi.

Election Year	Leader	Alliance	Seats			Popular vote			Sitting side
Election Year	Leader	Alliance	seats contested	seats won	+/- in seats	Votes	votes %	±pp	Sitting side
Lok Sabha Elections Performance in Telangana
2014	Narendra Modi	NDA	9	1 / 17	▲1	20,19,336	8.52%	Steady	Government
2019	Narendra Modi	NDA	17	4 / 17	▲3	36,26,173	19.65%	▲11.13%	Government
2024	Narendra Modi	NDA	17	8 / 17	▲4	77,43,947	35.08%	▲15.43%	Government

==== Elected Members to Lok Sabha election in Telangana ====
Lok Sabha Members in Telangana
S.No.	Portrait	Name	Election Years	Constituency		Popular Votes				Prime Minister
S.No.	Portrait	Name	Election Years	No.	Name	Votes	Vote %	Margin	Margin %	Prime Minister
2024 Lok Sabha Members in Telangana
01.		G. Nagesh (b. 21 October 1964)	2024	1	Adilabad (ST)	5,68,168	45.98%	90,652	7.33%	Narendra Modi
02.		Bandi Sanjay Kumar (b. 11 July 1971)	2024	3	Karimnagar	5,85,116	44.57%	2,25,209	17.16%	Narendra Modi
03.		Dharmapuri Arvind (b. 25 August 1976)	2024	4	Nizamabad	5,92,318	48.02%	1,09,241	8.86%	Narendra Modi
04.		Raghunandan Rao (b. 23 March 1968)	2024	6	Medak	4,71,217	33.99%	39,139	2.22%	Narendra Modi
05.		Etela Rajender (b. 20 March 1964)	2024	7	Malkajgiri	9,91,042	51.25%	3,91,475	20.25%	Narendra Modi
06.		G. Kishan Reddy (b. 15 June 1960)	2024	8	Secunderabad	4,73,012	45.15%	49,944	4.77%	Narendra Modi
07.		Konda Vishweshwar Reddy (b. 26 February 1960)	2024	10	Chevella	8,09,882	48.34%	1,72,897	10.32%	Narendra Modi
08.		D. K. Aruna (b. 4 May 1960)	2024	11	Mahabubnagar	5,10,747	41.66%	4,500	0.37%	Narendra Modi
2019 Lok Sabha Members in Telangana
01.		Soyam Bapu Rao (b. 28 April 1969)	2019	1	Adilabad (ST)	3,77,374	35.47%	58,560	5.51%	Narendra Modi
02.		Bandi Sanjay Kumar (b. 11 July 1971)	2019	3	Karimnagar	4,98,276	43.40%	89,508	7.80%	Narendra Modi
03.		Dharmapuri Arvind (b. 25 August 1976)	2019	4	Nizamabad	4,80,584	45.20%	70,875	6.66%	Narendra Modi
04.		G. Kishan Reddy (b. 15 June 1960)	2019	8	Secunderabad	3,84,780	42.04%	62,114	6.79%	Narendra Modi
2014 Lok Sabha Members in Telangana
01.		Bandaru Dattatreya (b. 12 June 1947)	2014	8	Secunderabad	4,38,271	43.66%	2,54,735	New entry	Narendra Modi

=== Telangana Legislative Assembly Election Performance ===
Election Year	Leader	Alliance	Seats			Popular vote			Sitting side
Election Year	Leader	Alliance	seats contested	seats won	+/- in seats	Votes	votes %	±pp	Sitting side
Telangana Legislative Assembly Election Performance
2014	G. Kishan Reddy	NDA	119	5 / 119	Steady	15,13,201	4.13%	Steady	Opposition
2018	T. Raja Singh	NDA	118	1 / 119	▼4	14,43,799	6.98%	▲2.85%	Opposition
2023	A.Maheshwar Reddy	NDA	111	8 / 119	▲7	32,57,528	13.90%	▲6.92%	Opposition

==== Elected Members to Telangana Legislative Assembly Election ====
List Members to Telangana Legislative Assembly
S.No.	Portrait	Name	Election	Constituency			Popular Votes		
S.No.	Portrait	Name	Election	District	No.	Name	Votes	Vote %	Margin
2023 Legislative Assembly Members in Telangana
01.		Palvai Harish Babu	2023	Asifabad	1	Sirpur	63,702	34.09%	3,088
02.		Payal Shanker	2023	Adilabad	7	Adilabad	67,608	35.84%	6,692
03.		Alleti Maheshwar Reddy	2023	Nirmal	9	Nirmal	1,06,400	54.03%	50,703
04.		Rama Rao Pawar	2023	Nirmal	10	Mudhole	98,252	48.59%	23,999
05.		Paidi Rakesh Reddy	2023	Nizamabad	11	Armur	72,658	44.90%	29,669
06.		K. V. Ramana Reddy	2023	Kamareddy	16	Kamareddy	66,652	34.55%	6,741
07.		Dhanpal Suryanarayana Gupta	2023	Nizamabad	17	Nizamabad Urban	75,240	40.82%	15,387
08.		T. Raja Singh	2023	Hyderabad	65	Goshamahal	80,182	54.08%	21,457
2018 Legislative Assembly Members in Telangana
01.		T. Raja Singh	2018	Hyderabad	65	Goshamahal	61,854	45.18%	17,734
2014 Legislative Assembly Members in Telangana
01.		N. V. S. S. Prabhakar	2014	Ranga Reddy	47	Uppal	82,395	36.8%	14,169
02.		K. Laxman	2014	Hyderabad	57	Musheerabad	65,209	43.5%%	27,386
03.		G. Kishan Reddy	2014	Hyderabad	59	Amberpet	81,430	55.92%	62,598
04.		Chintala Ramachandra Reddy	2014	Hyderabad	60	Khairatabad	53,102	37.3%	20,846
05.		T. Raja Singh	2014	Hyderabad	65	Goshamahal	80,182	58.9%	46,793

==== Elected Members to Telangana Legislative Council ====
Member of Telangana Legislative Council
S.No.	Portrait	Members	Position Held	Election Years	Constituency		Term in office		
S.No.	Portrait	Members	Position Held	Election Years	No.	Name	Assumed office	Left office	Time in office
Elected from Graduates constituencies
1		Chinnamile Anji Reddy	MLC	2025	3	Medak-Nizamabad -Adilabad - Karimnagar	30-Mar-2025	29-Mar-2031	1 year, 135 days
2		N. Ramchander Rao	MLC	2015	2	Mahbubnagar–Rangareddy–Hyderabad Graduates	30 March 2015	29 March 2021	6 years, 0 days
Elected from Teachers constituencies
3		Malka Komaraiah	MLC	2025	2	Medak–Nizamabad–Adilabad–Karimnagar	30-Mar-2025	29-Mar-2031	1 year, 135 days
4		A. Venkata Narayana Reddy	MLC	2023	3	Mahbubnagar–Ranga Reddy–Hyderabad	30-Mar-2023	29-Mar-2029	3 years, 135 days

== Leadership ==
=== State Party Leadership ===
==== State General Secretaries ====
- Sri Gujjula Premender Reddy
- Sri Dugyala Pradeep Rao
- Kum. Bangaru Shruthi
- Dr. Kasam Venkateshwarlu

==== State Secretary ====
- Sri M. Raghunandan Rao, MP-Medak Lok Sabha constituency
- Dr. Prakash Reddy
- Sri M. Srinivas Goud
- Smt. M. Jayasree
- Sri Palle Ganga Reddy
- Smt. Kolli Madhavi
- Smt. G. Umarani
- Smt. Akula Vijaya

==== State Special Invitees ====
- D. K. Aruna -BJP National Vice President
- Bandi Sanjay Kumar - BJP National General Secretary
- K. Laxman - OBC Morcha National President
- Sri Tarun Chugh-National General Secretary & Telangana State Incharge
- Sunil Bansal- National General Secretary & TS Election Saha Incharge
- Sri Shiv Prakash-BJP National Jt. Gen Secretary (Org.)
- Prakash Javadekar-Former Union Minister & Telangana State Election Incharge
- Dharmapuri Arvind-MP-Nizamabad Parliament
- Konda Vishweshwar Reddy-MP-Chevella Parliament
- Etela Rajender-BJP National Executive Spl. Invitee
- Sri N. Ramchander Rao- Ex,MLC
- Sri Marri Shashidhar Reddy-Former Minister
- Dr. Bura Narsaiah Goud-Ex.MP
- Sri A. Narayana Reddy, MLC-BJP National Executive Spl. Invitee
- Sri Garikapati Mohan Rao, Ex. MP
- Sri Ponguleti Sudhakar Reddy
- Sri Soyam Bapu Rao, Ex. MP
- Sri P. Muralidhar Rao

==== State Spokespersons ====
- Sri K. Krishna Sagar Rao
- Sri T. Veerender Goud
- Sri N. V. Subash
- Smt. Y. Rachna Reddy, Advocate
- Sri J. Sangappa
- Smt. Chandupatia Keerthi Reddy
- Sri Poreddy Kishore Reddy
- Sri Katta Sudhakar Reddy
- Smt. Rani Rudrama G
- Sri Ch. Vittal
- Sri G.Venkat Reddy, Retired Lecturer

==== State Prominent Leaders ====
- Smt.Mounika Sunkara- State Media Team POC, Assembly Prabhari, Legal Wing, Advocate.
- Dr. O. Srinivas Reddy-BJP Telangana - State Joint Treasurer
- Sri Vijay Surana Jain- BJP Telangana - State Joint Treasurer

=== List of State President of Bharatiya Janata Party, Telangana ===
President of Bharatiya Janata Party, Telangana
S.No.	Portrait	Name (born /death)	Term in office		
S.No.	Portrait	Name (born /death)	Assumed office	Left office	Time in office
1		G. Kishan Reddy (b. 15 June 1960)	2 June 2014	8 April 2016	1 year, 311 days
1		G. Kishan Reddy (b. 15 June 1960)	4 July 2023	30 June 2025	1 year, 361 days
2		Kova Laxman (b. 3 July 1960)	8 April 2016	11 March 2020	3 years, 338 days
3		Bandi Sanjay Kumar (b. 11 July 1971)	11 March 2020	4 July 2023	3 years, 115 days
4		N. Ramchander Rao (b. 27 April 1959)	1 July 2025	Incumbent	1 year, 42 days

== See also ==
- Bharatiya Janata Party
- National Democratic Alliance
- State units of the Bharatiya Janata Party
