= K. Nageshwar =

Indian professor, Youtuber, politician, and political analyst

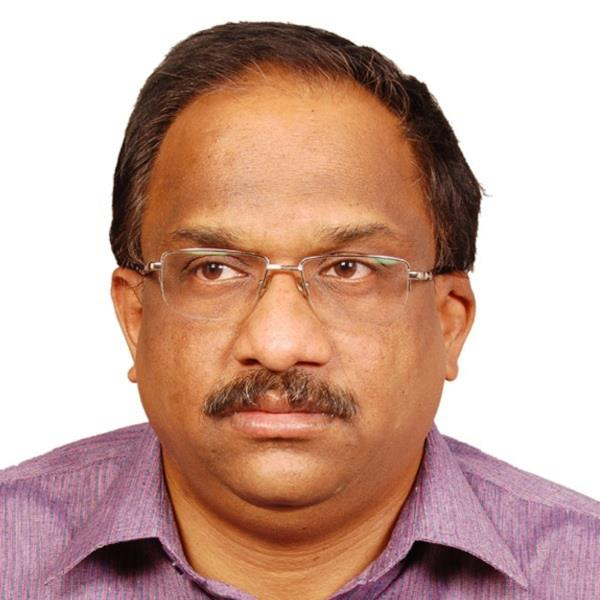

Member of Legislative Council, Telangana
- In office 30 March 2007 – 29 March 2015
- Preceded by: Office established
- Succeeded by: N. Ramchander Rao
- Constituency: Mahbubnagar–Rangareddy–Hyderabad Graduates

Personal details
- Born: 15 August 1963 (age 63) Adilabad, Andhra Pradesh (now in Telangana), India
- Party: Independent
- Spouse: K. Sri Lakshmi
- Children: 2
- Parents: K. Sadasiva Rao (father); K. Anasuya (mother)
- Education: City College, Hyderabad (BSc in Electronics); Osmania University (Post Graduate in Journalism); Osmania University (Ph.D in Political Science)
- Occupation: Professor; political analyst; Youtuber
- Website: https://professorn.in/

Kasanagottu Nageshwar is an Indian professor, politician, and political analyst. He served as member of the Andhra Pradesh Legislative Council and subsequently in Telangana Legislative Council during 2007 to 2015. Nageshwar was a professor at the Department of Communication & Journalism, Osmania University, Hyderabad, India.

== Electoral history ==
Year	Constituency	Party	Votes	%	Opponent	Party	Votes	%	Result	Margin	%
2007	Mahbubnagar–Ranga Reddy–Hyderabad (MLC)	IND	—	—	P. Venugopal Reddy	INC	—	—	Won	—	—
2009	Mahbubnagar–Ranga Reddy–Hyderabad (MLC)	IND	59,840	30.70	N. Ramchander Rao	BJP	45,120	23.15	Won	+14,720	+7.55
2014	Malkajgiri (MP)	IND	13,239	0.82	Malla Reddy	TDP	5,23,356	32.30	Lost	-5,10,117	-31.48
2021	Mahbubnagar–Ranga Reddy–Hyderabad (MLC)	IND	45,120	13.39	Surabhi Vani Devi	TRS	1,49,271	44.27	Lost	-1,04,151	-30.88

== Career ==
He won the elections to the Legislative Council from the Graduates’ Constituency of Hyderabad, Mahabubnagar and Ranga Reddy districts first in 2007 and subsequently in 2009. Contesting as an Independent Candidate, he defeated the candidates belonging to the major political parties.

Earlier, he worked with Indian Express and the Times of India groups. During over three decades of journalistic experience, he published articles in the leading newspapers/magazines. He regularly comments on TV channels and his YouTube channel on wide-ranging contemporary issues. Leading websites publish his articles.

He received the Junior Research Fellowship in Journalism in 1986. He won the UGC Career Award in 1994. He has been the visiting professor at Birla Institute of Technology and Sciences, BITS Pilani, Hyderabad; National Academy of Administration, Mussoorie, National Police Academy, DR MCR Institute of Human Resource Development, NALSAR, SRM University and many Journalism Schools.

He is the former editor of The Hans India, English Daily. He was earlier the Editor-in-Chief of Telugu news channel HMTV. He was the founder chairman of 10TV. He is the author of the books Interpreting Contemporary India; How to win at life.

== Controversy over political remarks ==
In May 2026, Nageshwar became the subject of controversy following remarks made during a televised discussion in which he claimed, citing unnamed sources, that Janasena Party leaders Pawan Kalyan and Nadendla Manohar had met Union Home Minister Amit Shah seeking action against Y. S. Jagan Mohan Reddy. He further alleged that Shah had stated that the BJP's alliance with the Telugu Desam Party was temporary and had referred to Y. S. Jagan Mohan Reddy as a "long-term friend".

Janasena leaders rejected the allegations as false and announced legal action against those disseminating the claims. Following the controversy, Nageshwar faced criticism on social media, including from supporters of the Janasena Party and the Telugu Desam Party.

Multiple FIRs were subsequently registered against Nageshwar and others in Andhra Pradesh under various provisions of the Bharatiya Nyaya Sanhita. Nageshwar later withdrew his remarks and issued an unconditional apology, stating that the information provided by his sources may have been incorrect.

The FIRs prompted reactions from several political leaders, including BJP leader P. Muralidhar Rao and TRS president K. Kavitha, who criticized the police action and expressed concerns regarding freedom of expression.
