= Maharajgunj Assembly constituency =

Former assembly constituency of Andhra Pradesh, India

Maharajgunj
- Former constituency No. 214 for the Andhra Pradesh Legislative Assembly

Constituency details
- Country: India
- Region: South India
- State: Andhra Pradesh
- District: Hyderabad
- Lok Sabha constituency: Hyderabad
- Abolished: 2008

Maharajgunj was a constituency of the Andhra Pradesh Legislative Assembly covering the neighbourhood of Maharajgunj in the Hyderabad district of Andhra Pradesh (now Telangana), India.

Maharajgunj was one of the assembly constituencies in the Hyderabad (Lok Sabha constituency). After the 2008 delimitation, this constituency was abolished and replaced by the Goshamahal Assembly constituency.

== Members of the Legislative Assembly ==
Election	MLA	Party	Total Vote
1978	Shiv Pershad	INC(I)	22,801
1983	P. Rama Swamy	TDP	17,835
1985	G. Narayan Rao	TDP	24,584
1989	M. Mukesh	INC	28,890
1994	P. Ramaswamy	BJP	14,206
1999	Prem Singh Rathore	BJP	33,969
2004	M. Mukesh	INC	31,875

== Election results ==
=== 2004 ===
2004 Andhra Pradesh Legislative Assembly election: Maharajgunj
Party	Candidate	Votes	%	±%
INC	M. Mukesh	31,875	56.30	+10.67
BJP	Prem Singh Rathore	22,317	39.42	−11.31
BSP	Durga Prasad Tivari	1,216	2.15	New
Majority		9,558	16.88	+11.78
Turnout		56,615	61.10	−1.27
INC gain from BJP		Swing	+10.99	

=== 1999 ===
1999 Andhra Pradesh Legislative Assembly election: Maharajgunj
Party	Candidate	Votes	%	±%
BJP	Prem Singh Rathore	33,969	50.73	+24.02
INC	M. Mukesh	30,553	45.63	+23.73
Majority		3,416	5.10	+4.73
Turnout		66,956	62.37	+5.37
BJP hold		Swing	+24.02	

=== 1994 ===
1994 Andhra Pradesh Legislative Assembly election: Maharajgunj
Party	Candidate	Votes	%	±%
BJP	P. Ramaswamy	14,206	26.71	−20.09
Independent	M. Mukesh	14,009	26.34	New
TDP	Prem Singh Rathore	11,815	22.21	New
INC	K. Keshava Rao	11,650	21.90	−29.53
Majority		197	0.37	−4.26
Turnout		53,188	57.00	−5.46
BJP gain from INC		Swing		

=== 1989 ===
1989 Andhra Pradesh Legislative Assembly election: Maharajgunj
Party	Candidate	Votes	%	±%
INC	M. Mukesh	28,890	51.43	+20.68
BJP	Bandaru Dattatreya	26,294	46.80	New
Majority		2,596	4.63	−18.04
Turnout		56,178	62.46	+7.90
INC gain from TDP		Swing		

=== 1985 ===
1985 Andhra Pradesh Legislative Assembly election: Maharajgunj
Party	Candidate	Votes	%	±%
TDP	G. Narayan Rao	24,584	53.42	New
INC	Lalita Rao Yadav	14,152	30.75	+1.31
Independent	Shanker Singh	4,287	9.31	New
Independent	Damodhar	1,613	3.50	New
Majority		10,432	22.67	+15.40
Turnout		46,023	54.56	+0.48
TDP gain from Independent		Swing		

=== 1983 ===
1983 Andhra Pradesh Legislative Assembly election: Maharajgunj
Party	Candidate	Votes	%	±%
Independent	P. Ramaswamy	17,835	36.71	New
INC	Shiv Pershad	14,303	29.44	−15.65
BJP	Ganga Shankar Vyas	12,531	25.79	New
Independent	Nayeemuddin	1,988	4.09	New
JP	D. Shankar	1,047	2.16	−42.40
Indian Congress (Jagjivan)	Sardar Deep Singh	528	1.09	New
Majority		3,532	7.27	+6.74
Turnout		48,582	54.08	−8.54
Independent gain from INC(I)		Swing		

=== 1978 ===
1978 Andhra Pradesh Legislative Assembly election: Maharajgunj
Party	Candidate	Votes	%	±%
INC(I)	Shiv Pershad	22,801	45.09	
JP	Badri Vishal Pitti	22,535	44.56	
INC	N. Laxminarayana	3,819	7.55	
Independent	Khursheed Hussain	583	1.15	
Majority		266	0.53	
Turnout		50,569	62.62	
gain from		Swing		

== See also ==
- Goshamahal Assembly constituency
- Hyderabad (Lok Sabha constituency)
- Hyderabad district
- Telangana Legislative Assembly
- Andhra Pradesh Legislative Assembly
