= 2019 Indian general election in Telangana =

Indian lower house election in TG State

- 11 April 2019 (Phase 1)

All 17 Telangana seats to the Lok Sabha
- Turnout: 62.77%
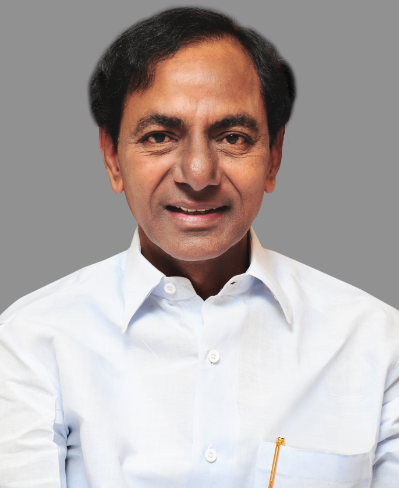

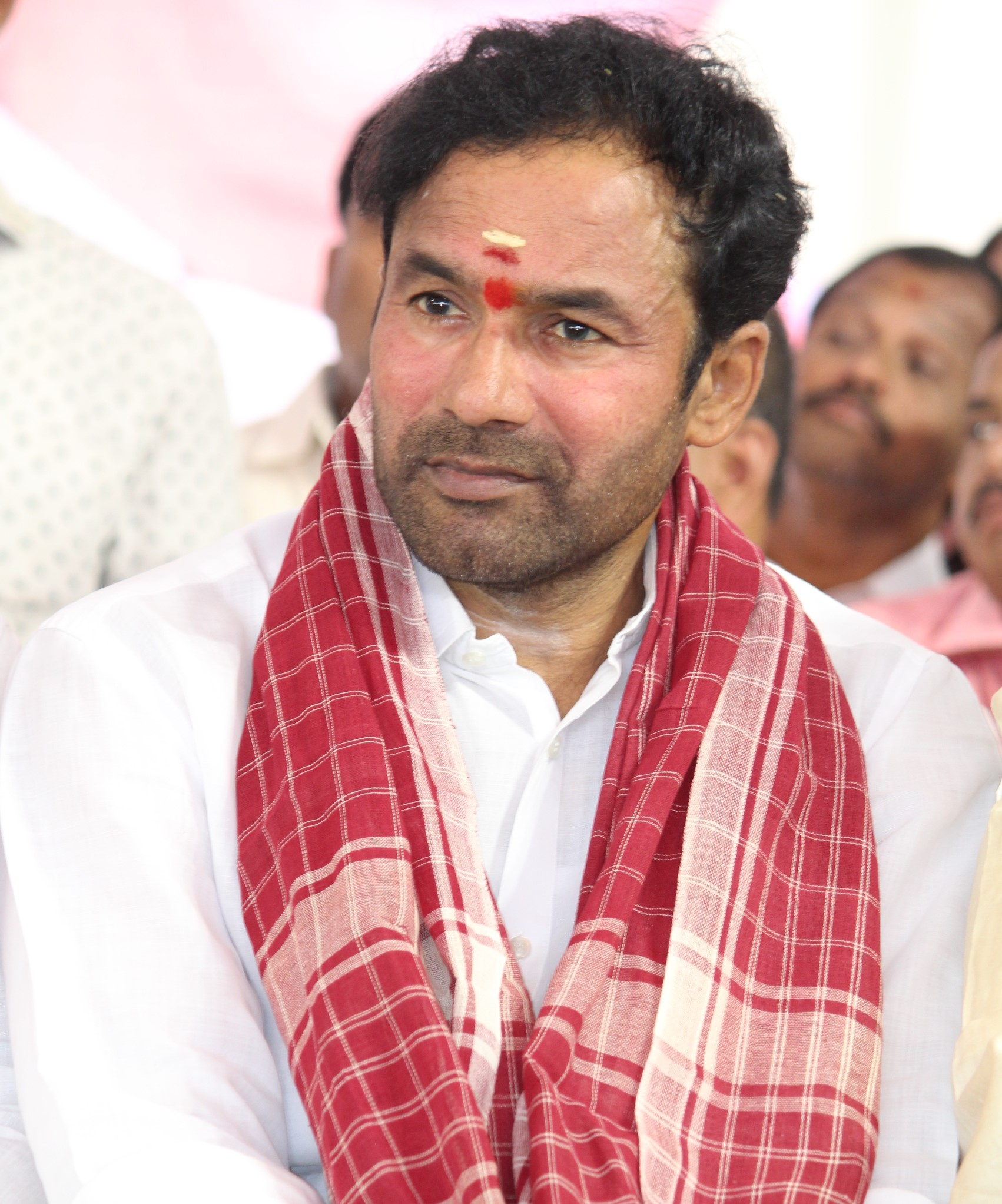

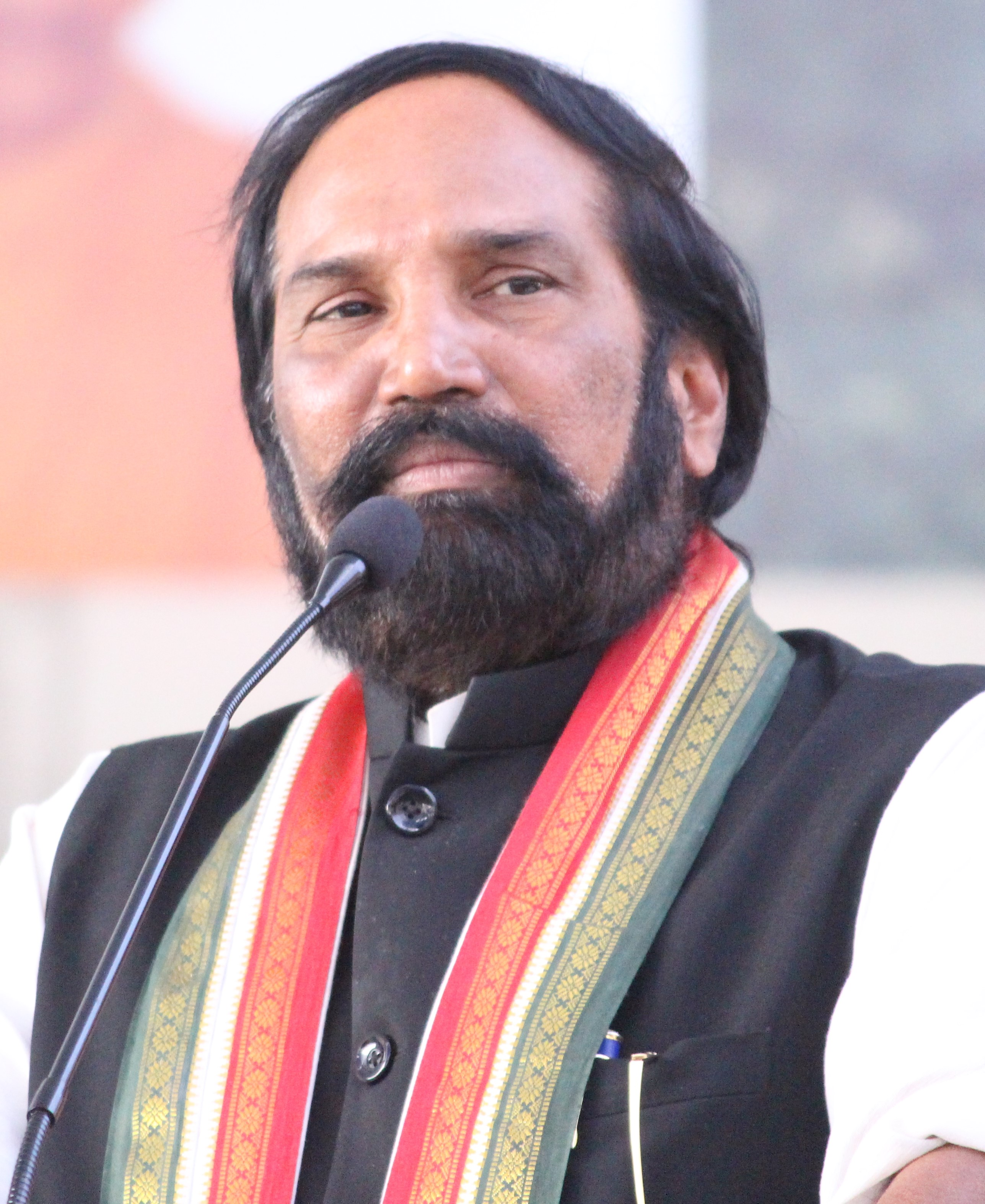

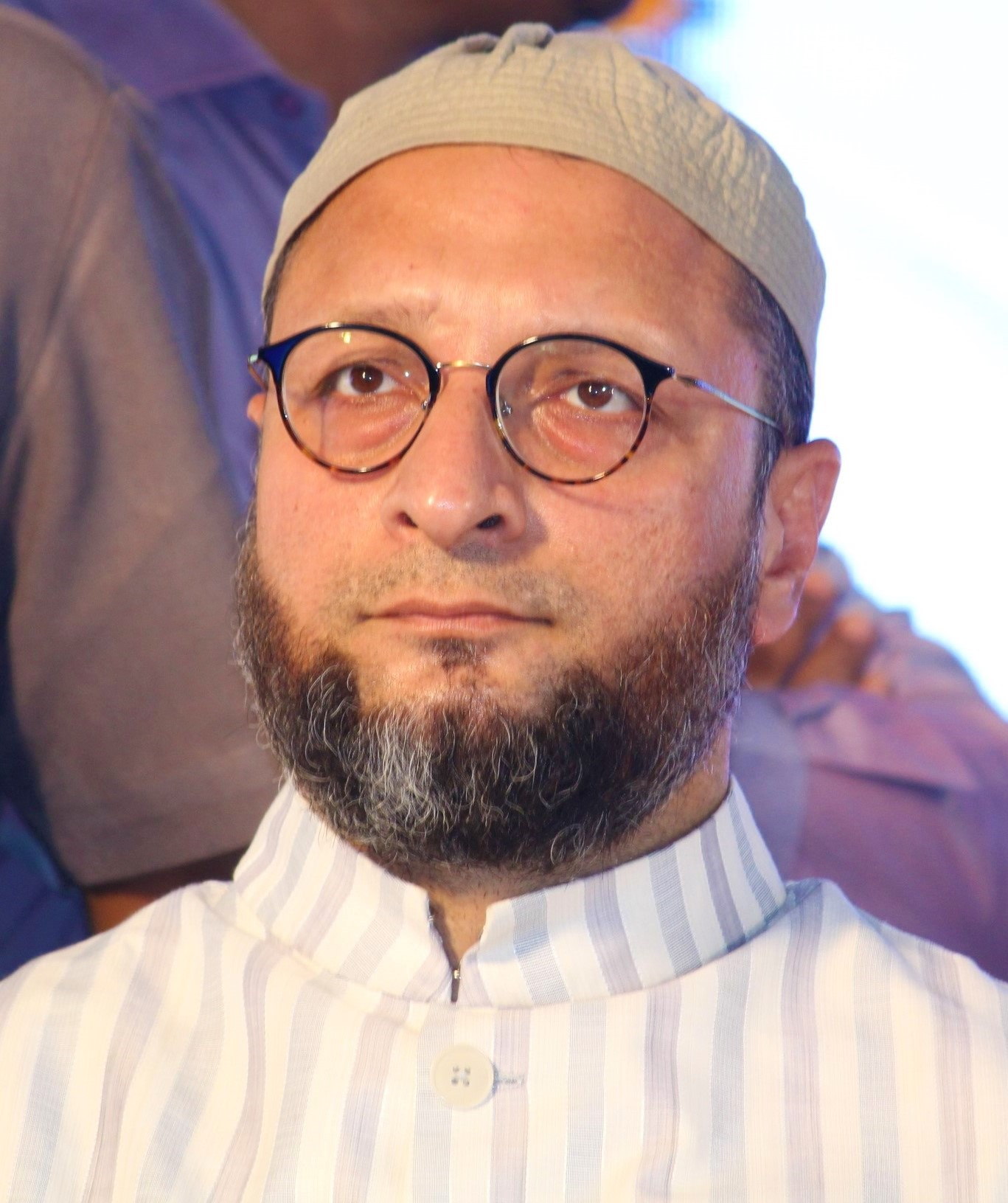
	First party	Second party
Leader	K. Chandrashekar Rao	G. Kishan Reddy
Party	TRS	BJP
Alliance		NDA
Leader's seat	Did not stand (Note: Represents Gajwel in the Telangana Legislative Assembly)	Secunderabad
Last election	34.94%, 11 seats	10.46%, 1 seat
Seats won	9	4
Seat change	▼2	▲3
Popular vote	7,696,848	3,626,173
Percentage	41.71%	19.65%
Swing	▲6.77 pp	▲9.19 pp
	Third party	Fourth party
Leader	N. Uttam Kumar Reddy	Asaduddin Owaisi
Party	INC	AIMIM
Alliance	UPA
Leader's seat	Nalgonda	Hyderabad
Last election	24.68%, 2 seats	3.53%, 1 seat
Seats won	3	1
Seat change	▲1	Steady
Popular vote	5,496,686	517,471
Percentage	29.79%	2.80%
Swing	▲5.11 pp	▼0.73 pp
Prime Minister before election
Narendra Modi
BJP
Prime Minister after election
Narendra Modi
BJP

The 2019 Indian general election in Telangana was held on 11 April 2019, to constitute the 17th Lok Sabha.

== Parties and alliances ==
Party/Alliance		Flag	Symbol	Leader	Seats contested
Telangana Rashtra Samithi				K. Chandrashekhar Rao	17
Indian National Congress				N. Uttam Kumar Reddy	17
Bharatiya Janata Party				K. Laxman	17
JSP+	Janasena Party			Pawan Kalyan	7
JSP+	Bahujan Samaj Party		BSP elephant	Mayawati	5
JSP+	Communist Party of India			Chada Venkat Reddy	2
JSP+	Communist Party of India (Marxist)			Tammineni Veerabhadram	2
All India Majlis-e-Ittehadul Muslimeen				Asaduddin Owaisi	1
Telangana Jana Samithi				M. Kodandaram	1

Telugu Desam Party for the first time in history did not contest the election, instead extended support to Indian National Congress.

Even YSR Congress Party abstrained from Telangana Lok Sabha election, instead focused on Andhra Pradesh election.

== Candidates ==
Constituency		TRS		INC		BJP	
#	Name	Party	Candidate	Party	Candidate	Party	Candidate
1	Adilabad	TRS	Godam Nagesh	INC	Ramesh Rathod	BJP	Soyam Bapu Rao
2	Peddapalle	TRS	Venkatesh Borlakunta	INC	A. Chandrasekhar	BJP	Sogala Kumar
3	Karimnagar	TRS	B. Vinod Kumar	INC	Ponnam Prabhakar	BJP	Bandi Sanjay
4	Nizamabad	TRS	K. Kavitha	INC	Madhu Yaskhi Goud	BJP	Dharmapuri Arvind
5	Zahirabad	TRS	B. B. Patil	INC	K. Madan Mohan Rao	BJP	Banala Laxma Reddy
6	Medak	TRS	K. Prabhakar Reddy	INC	Anil Kumar Gali	BJP	Raghunandan Rao
7	Malkajgiri	TRS	M. Rajasekhar Reddy	INC	A. Revanth Reddy	BJP	N. Ramchander Rao
8	Secunderabad	TRS	Talasani Sai Kiran	INC	Anjan Yadav	BJP	G. Kishan Reddy
9	Hyderabad	TRS	Srikanth Pusthe	INC	Feroz Khan	BJP	Bhagavanth Rao
10	Chevella	TRS	G. Ranjith Reddy	INC	K. Vishweshwar Reddy	BJP	B. Janardhan Reddy
11	Mahabubnagar	TRS	Manne Reddy	INC	Challa Vamshi Reddy	BJP	D. K. Aruna
12	Nagarkurnool	TRS	Pothuganti Ramulu	INC	Mallu Ravi	BJP	Shruthi Bangaru
13	Nalgonda	TRS	Vemireddy N. Reddy	INC	Uttam Kumar Reddy	BJP	Garlapati Jithendra Kumar
14	Bhongir	TRS	B. Narsaiah Goud	INC	Komatireddy Reddy	BJP	Padala Venkata Rao
15	Warangal	TRS	Pasunoori Dayakar	INC	Dommati Sambaiah	BJP	Chintha Sambamurthy
16	Mahabubabad	TRS	Kavitha Maloth	INC	Balram Naik	BJP	Jatothu Hussain
17	Khammam	TRS	Nama Nageswara Rao	INC	Renuka Chowdhury	BJP	Devaki Vasudeva Rao

== Results ==
=== Results by Party ===
Party Name	Popular vote			Seats		
Party Name	Votes	%	±pp	Contested	Won	+/−
TRS	76,96,848	41.29	▲6.35	17	9	▼2
INC	54,96,686	29.48	▲4.80	17	3	▲1
BJP	36,26,173	19.45	▲8.99	17	4	▲3
AIMIM	5,17,471	2.78	▼0.75	1	1	Steady
JSP	85,781	0.46	Steady	7	0	Steady
CPI	73,872	0.40	Steady	2	0	Steady
CPI(M)	82,191	0.44	Steady	2	0	Steady
Others	2,86,516	1.54	Steady	81	0	Steady
IND	5,86,559	3.15	Steady	299	0	Steady
NOTA	1,90,798	1.02	Steady			
Total	1,86,42,895	100%	-	460	17	-

Party	BRS	BJP	INC	AIMIM
Leader	K. Chandrashekhar Rao	G. Kishan Reddy	N. Uttam Kumar Reddy	Asaduddin Owaisi
Votes	41.29%, 7,696,848	19.45%, 3,626,173	29.48%, 5,496,686	2.78%, 517,471
Seats	9 (52.94%)	4 (23.53%)	3 (17.64%)	1 (5.88%)
Seats	9 / 17	4 / 17	3 / 17	1 / 17

== Detailed Results of Winners ==
Constituency		Winner				Runner Up				Margin	%
#	Name	Candidate	Party	Votes	%	Candidate	Party	Votes	%	Margin	%
1	Adilabad	Soyam Bapu Rao	BJP	377,374	35.47	G. Nagesh	TRS	318,814	29.96	58,560	5.51
2	Peddapalle	Venkatesh Netha Borlakunta	TRS	441,321	45.49	Agam Chandrasekhar	INC	346,141	35.68	95,180	9.81
3	Karimnagar	Bandi Sanjay Kumar	BJP	498,276	43.40	B. Vinod Kumar	TRS	408,768	35.60	89,508	7.80
4	Nizamabad	Arvind Dharmapuri	BJP	480,584	45.20	Kalvakuntla Kavitha	TRS	409,709	38.54	70,875	6.66
5	Zahirabad	B. B. Patil	TRS	434,244	41.57	Madan Mohan Rao	INC	428,015	40.98	6,229	0.59
6	Medak	Kotha Prabhakar Reddy	TRS	596,048	51.82	Anil Kumar Gali	INC	279,621	24.31	316,427	27.51
7	Malkajgiri	Revanth Reddy	INC	603,748	38.61	Marri Rajasekhar Reddy	TRS	592,829	37.91	10,919	0.70
8	Secundrabad	G. Kishan Reddy	BJP	384,780	42.04	Talasani Sai Kiran Yadav	TRS	322,666	35.25	62,114	6.79
9	Hyderabad	Asaduddin Owaisi	AIMIM	517,471	58.94	Dr. Bhagavanth Rao	BJP	235,285	26.80	282,186	32.14
10	Chevella	G. Ranjith Reddy	TRS	528,148	40.60	Konda Vishweshwar Reddy	INC	513,831	39.50	14,317	1.10
11	Mahbubnagar	Manne Srinivas Reddy	TRS	411,402	41.78	D. K. Aruna	BJP	333,573	33.87	77,829	7.91
12	Nagarkurnool	Pothuganti Ramulu	TRS	499,672	50.48	Mallu Ravi	INC	309,924	31.31	189,748	19.17
13	Nalgonda	N. Uttam Kumar Reddy	INC	526,028	44.73	Vemireddy Narasimha Reddy	TRS	500,346	42.55	25,682	2.18
14	Bhongir	Komatireddy Venkat Reddy	INC	532,795	43.93	Boora Narsaiah Goud	TRS	527,576	43.50	5,219	0.43
15	Warangal	Pasunuri Dayakar	TRS	612,498	57.69	Dommati Sambaiah	INC	262,200	24.70	350,298	32.99
16	Mahabubabad	Kavitha Maloth	TRS	462,109	46.98	Balram Naik	INC	315,446	32.07	146,663	14.91
17	Khammam	Nama Nageswara Rao	TRS	567,459	49.78	Renuka Chowdhury	INC	399,397	35.04	168,062	14.74

== Assembly segments wise lead of parties ==
Party	Assembly segments	Position in Assembly (Note: (as of the 2018 election))	Change in Seats
TRS	67	88	▼21
BJP	25	1	▲24
INC	21	19	▲2
AIMIM	6	7	▼1
TDP	—N/a	2	▼2
Others	—N/a	2	▼2
Total	119		

== Detailed Results for Assembly segments wise lead of parties ==
Constituency		Winner		Runner-up		Margin
#	Name	Party	Votes	Party	Votes	Margin
Adilabad Lok Sabha constituency
1	Sirpur	TRS	60,740	INC	47,355	13,385
5	Asifabad (ST)	TRS	47,401	BJP	44,874	2,527
6	Khanapur (ST)	INC	60,748	BJP	47,320	13,428
7	Adilabad	BJP	63,169	TRS	47,594	15,575
8	Boath (ST)	BJP	61,094	TRS	42,850	18,244
9	Nirmal	BJP	61,172	INC	46,617	14,555
10	Mudhole	BJP	75,216	TRS	44,212	31,004
Peddapalli Lok Sabha constituency
2	Chennur (SC)	TRS	67,219	INC	35,496	31,723
3	Bellampalle (SC)	TRS	56,325	INC	36,207	20,118
4	Mancherial	TRS	69,999	INC	54,841	15,158
22	Dharmapuri (SC)	TRS	68,162	INC	43,290	24,872
23	Ramagundam	INC	49,820	TRS	47,680	2,140
24	Manthani	INC	68,924	TRS	60,878	8,046
25	Peddapalle	TRS	70,744	INC	57,377	13,367
Karimnagar Lok Sabha constituency
26	Karimnagar	BJP	1,10,689	TRS	58,508	52,181
27	Choppadandi (SC)	BJP	97,441	TRS	41,396	56,045
28	Vemulawada	BJP	73,290	TRS	47,399	25,891
29	Sircilla	TRS	70,482	BJP	64,769	5,713
30	Manakondur (SC)	BJP	81,953	TRS	46,679	35,274
31	Huzurabad	TRS	77,211	INC	46,689	30,522
32	Husnabad	TRS	66,885	INC	44,123	22,762
Nizamabad Lok Sabha constituency
11	Armur	BJP	72,472	TRS	40,884	31,588
12	Bodhan	TRS	63,165	BJP	56,531	6,634
17	Nizamabad (Urban)	TRS	67,849	BJP	60,700	7,149
18	Nizamabad (Rural)	BJP	77,443	TRS	64,258	13,185
19	Balkonda	BJP	68,064	TRS	56,502	11,562
20	Koratla	BJP	78,359	TRS	58,410	19,949
21	Jagtial	BJP	66,179	TRS	58,413	7,766
Zahirabad Lok Sabha constituency
13	Jukkal (SC)	TRS	64,681	INC	48,901	15,780
14	Banswada	TRS	65,629	INC	45,569	20,060
15	Yellareddy	INC	62,592	TRS	53,755	8,837
16	Kamareddy	INC	65,679	TRS	49,258	16,421
35	Narayankhed	TRS	63,999	INC	54,634	9,365
36	Andole (SC)	TRS	76,945	INC	67,167	9,778
38	Zaheerabad (SC)	INC	83,358	TRS	59,799	23,559
Medak Lok Sabha constituency
33	Siddipet	TRS	78,102	BJP	30,995	47,107
34	Medak	TRS	67,901	INC	43,425	24,476
37	Narsapur	TRS	91,980	INC	42,096	49,884
39	Sangareddy	TRS	62,090	BJP	35,048	27,042
40	Patancheru	TRS	94,896	INC	59,410	35,486
41	Dubbak	TRS	82,024	BJP	29,546	52,478
42	Gajwel	TRS	1,18,837	INC	34,650	84,187
Malkajgiri Lok Sabha constituency
43	Medchal	TRS	1,30,286	INC	1,22,199	8,087
44	Malkajgiri	INC	81,875	TRS	72,034	9,841
45	Quthbullapur	TRS	1,15,918	INC	1,07,144	8,774
46	Kukatpally	TRS	79,312	INC	73,770	5,542
47	Uppal	INC	85,385	TRS	77,501	7,884
49	Lal Bahadur Nagar	INC	97,858	TRS	70,454	27,404
71	Secunderabad Cantt. (SC)	TRS	46,980	INC	34,676	12,304
Secunderabad Lok Sabha constituency
57	Musheerabad	BJP	65,959	TRS	41,564	24,395
59	Amberpet	BJP	80,244	TRS	34,854	45,390
60	Khairatabad	BJP	58,885	TRS	45,270	13,615
61	Jubilee Hills	TRS	58,032	BJP	40,552	17,480
62	Sanathnagar	BJP	54,015	TRS	38,790	15,225
63	Nampally	TRS	60,632	BJP	32,399	28,233
70	Secunderabad	BJP	52,194	TRS	43,340	8,854
Hyderabad Lok Sabha constituency
58	Malakpet	AIMIM	60,592	BJP	29,659	30,933
64	Karwan	AIMIM	90,288	BJP	39,629	50,659
65	Goshamahal	BJP	83,025	AIMIM	28,275	54,750
66	Charminar	AIMIM	57,259	BJP	27,879	29,380
67	Chandrayangutta	AIMIM	99,298	BJP	18,715	80,583
68	Yakutpura	AIMIM	80,503	BJP	24,659	55,844
69	Bahadurpura	AIMIM	1,01,024	BJP	11,490	89,534
Chevella Lok Sabha constituency
50	Maheswaram	TRS	89,989	INC	72,176	17,813
51	Rajendranagar	TRS	98,748	INC	70,162	28,586
52	Serilingampally	TRS	1,02,272	INC	92,108	10,164
53	Chevella (SC)	INC	80,684	TRS	64,853	15,831
54	Pargi	INC	66,629	TRS	60,055	6,574
55	Vicarabad (SC)	INC	69,977	TRS	49,318	20,659
56	Tandur	TRS	62,643	INC	61,444	1,199
Mahabubnagar Lok Sabha constituency
72	Kodangal	TRS	55,402	BJP	33,054	22,348
73	Narayanpet	TRS	53,641	BJP	52,430	1,211
74	Mahbubnagar	BJP	59,566	TRS	55,005	4,561
75	Jadcherla	TRS	65,345	BJP	44,819	20,526
76	Devarkadra	TRS	61,012	BJP	47,764	13,248
77	Makthal	BJP	54,687	TRS	52,633	2,054
84	Shadnagar	TRS	68,203	BJP	40,801	27,402
Nagarkurnool Lok Sabha constituency
78	Wanaparthy	TRS	74,793	INC	47,352	27,441
79	Gadwal	TRS	83,118	BJP	35,101	48,017
80	Alampur (SC)	TRS	71,264	INC	56,777	14,487
81	Nagarkurnool	TRS	60,531	INC	48,155	12,376
82	Achampet (SC)	TRS	72,431	INC	45,184	27,247
83	Kalwakurthy	TRS	70,645	BJP	23,760	46,885
85	Kollapur	TRS	66,646	INC	41,694	24,952
Nalgonda Lok Sabha constituency
86	Devarakonda (ST)	INC	71,689	TRS	67,122	4,567
87	Nagarjuna Sagar	INC	71,820	TRS	68,125	3,695
88	Miryalaguda	INC	75,669	TRS	68,483	7,186
89	Huzurnagar	INC	88,138	TRS	75,145	12,993
90	Kodad	INC	85,874	TRS	73,944	11,930
91	Suryapet	TRS	77,862	INC	66,363	11,499
92	Nalgonda	TRS	69,439	INC	65,955	3,484
Bhongir Lok Sabha constituency
48	Ibrahimpatnam	INC	80,539	TRS	74,915	5,624
93	Munugode	INC	79,843	TRS	75,133	4,710
94	Bhongir	INC	73,677	TRS	70,937	2,740
95	Nakrekal (SC)	INC	86,941	TRS	75,641	11,300
96	Thungathurthi (SC)	TRS	80,006	INC	76,424	3,582
97	Alair	TRS	82,223	INC	72,063	10,160
98	Jangaon	TRS	68,380	INC	62,544	5,836
Warangal Lok Sabha constituency
99	Ghanpur (Station) (SC)	TRS	94,327	INC	42,687	51,640
100	Palakurthi	TRS	92,437	INC	39,745	52,692
104	Parkal	TRS	87,567	INC	39,433	48,134
105	Warangal West	TRS	62,669	INC	33,417	29,252
106	Warangal East	TRS	85,873	INC	28,976	56,897
107	Waradhanapet (SC)	TRS	97,526	INC	33,846	63,680
108	Bhupalpalle	TRS	91,628	INC	43,712	47,916
Mahabubabad Lok Sabha constituency
101	Dornakal (ST)	TRS	78,986	INC	53,639	25,347
102	Mahabubabad (ST)	TRS	84,031	INC	55,785	28,246
103	Narsampet	TRS	84,858	INC	59,058	25,800
109	Mulug (ST)	TRS	71,518	INC	40,735	30,783
110	Pinapaka (ST)	TRS	55,958	INC	30,484	25,474
111	Yellandu (ST)	TRS	53,891	INC	53,742	149
119	Bhadrachalam (ST)	TRS	32,582	INC	21,819	10,763
Khammam Lok Sabha constituency
112	Khammam	TRS	95,001	INC	69,979	25,022
113	Palair	TRS	92,082	INC	57,208	34,874
114	Madhira (SC)	TRS	81,932	INC	63,134	18,798
115	Wyra (ST)	TRS	65,819	INC	58,139	7,680
116	Sathupalle (SC)	TRS	95,423	INC	63,486	31,937
117	Kothagudem	TRS	73,394	INC	55,345	18,049
118	Aswaraopeta (ST)	TRS	62,970	INC	31,717	31,253

== Post-election Union Council of Ministers from Telangana ==
#	Name	Constituency	Designation	Department	From	To	Party
1	G. Kishan Reddy	Secundrabad	MoS	Ministry of Home Affairs	31 May 2019	7 July 2021	BJP
1	G. Kishan Reddy	Secundrabad	Cabinet Minister	Ministry of Culture; Ministry of Tourism; Minister of DoNER	7 July 2021	9 June 2024	BJP
