= Kalvakuntla =

Kalvakuntla is a Telugu surname. Notable people with the surname include:

- Kalvakuntla Chandrashekhar Rao (born 1954), Indian politician
- K. Kavitha (born Kalvakuntla Kavitha in 1978), Indian politician
- K. T. Rama Rao (born Kalvakuntla Taraka Rama Rao in 1976), Indian politician
