= T. Raja Singh =

Indian politician

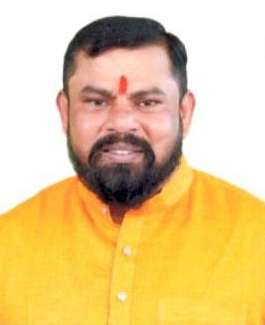

Member of Telangana Legislative Assembly
- Incumbent
- Assumed office 2 June 2014
- Preceded by: Mukesh Goud
- Constituency: Goshamahal

Personal details
- Born: Thakur Raja Singh Lodh; 15 April 1977 (age 49) Hyderabad, Andhra Pradesh (present-day Telangana), India
- Party: Independent (since 2025)
- Other political affiliations: Telugu Desam Party (2009–2014); Bharatiya Janata Party (2014–2022, 2023–2025)
- Spouse: T. Usha

Thakur Raja Singh (born 15 April 1977) is an Indian politician from the state of Telangana. He served as the MLA of the Telangana Legislative Assembly representing the Goshamahal Assembly constituency in Hyderabad from 2014 to 2025.

Singh had served as the party whip for the Bharatiya Janata Party in the state of Telangana. He was suspended from the party on 23 August 2022 for his remarks on Muhammad, as mentioned in Islamic scriptures, during the 2022 Muhammad remarks controversy, but his suspension was revoked on 22 October 2023 to allow him to contest the 2023 Telangana Legislative Assembly election. He has 105 criminal cases registered against him, of which 18 were related to communal offences.

He resigned from the BJP in June 2025, citing dissatisfaction with the party’s leadership decisions in the state.

In November 2025, Singh was booked by Hyderabad Police for allegedly making sacrilegious remarks against the Islamic prophet Muhammad during a public event. The FIR was registered following complaints from community organisations, citing that the remarks were circulated on social media.

== Personal life ==
T. Raja Singh was born to T. Naval Singh and hails from Goshamahal, Hyderabad. He is married to T. Usha. He has three sons and one daughter.

For the 2023 Telangana Legislative Assembly election, he self-declared 85 criminal cases and assets of ₹4.7 crore.

== Political career ==
In his early thirties, Singh was close to Mukesh Goud, the Goshamahal MLA from the Congress party, and Mettu Vaikuntam, the BJP corporator from Goshamahal. These connections helped him gain a following in Goshamahal. With Goud’s help, Singh was also involved in the Congress Party’s youth wing for some time.

Singh started his political career in 2009 with the Telugu Desam Party and was elected as the representative from Mangalhat to the Greater Hyderabad Municipal Corporation (GHMC) until 2014. It was a stronghold of the Indian National Congress before his arrival.

He joined the BJP ahead of the 2014 Andhra Pradesh Legislative Assembly election, on the insistence of Mettu Vaikuntam, and won the election for the Goshamahal Assembly constituency with a margin of 46,793 against Mukesh Goud.

In 2018, he was re-elected to the Telangana Legislative Assembly from the same constituency with a margin of 17,734 against the Bharat Rashtra Samithi candidate Prem Singh Rathore.

Since his joining the BJP in 2014, he has left the party three times on the grounds that the BJP has not been doing enough for the Hindus and more so for cow protection. Intelligence officials have claimed that he is one of the main men in the "Sriram Yuva Sena", a pro-hindutva organisation from the days of United Andhra Pradesh, consisting mainly of gau-rakshaks. The group emerged for a while after his suspension from the BJP for his controversial remarks against Prophet Muhammad.

In October 2023, following the revocation of his suspension, he was fielded as the BJP candidate in the 2023 Telangana Legislative Assembly elections, and won the seat for the third time in a row.

== Controversies ==
=== Arrest for fanning communal clashes (2010) ===
In April 2010, Singh was arrested on charges of attempting to provoke communal clashes in Hyderabad. Police accused him of making inflammatory remarks that risked disturbing public peace.

=== Arrest for purchasing and using a Stolen Vehicle (2012) ===
In 2012, while serving as the Mangalhat representative for the Greater Hyderabad Municipal Corporation (GHMC), Singh was arrested for theft and related offences. Hyderabad Police alleged that he knowlingly purchased and used a stolen Toyota Qualis belonging to the Government of Kerala. The vehicle had been running on fake registration documents, carrying the number of a TVS Champ two-wheeler. Singh's associates claimed that the arrest was politically motivated and influenced by rival parties.

=== Remarks on Hyderabad as "Mini Pakistan" (2017) ===
In May 2017, Singh described the Old City area of Hyderabad as "mini Pakistan", sparking outrage. His comments were criticised as hate speech, divisive, and communal in nature.

=== Comments on Gujarat Riots and call for Violence (2017) ===
In July 2017, Singh urged the Hindu community in West Bengal to respond to communal tensions in the same way as the 2002 Gujarat riots, which left hundreds dead. The remarks were widely condemned as inflammatory and dangerous.

=== Calls for banning the Quran (2018) ===
In June 2018, Singh called for a ban on the Quran, describing it as a source of violence. His demand was denounced by multiple political parties and religious groups.

=== Remarks against Muslims and Rohingyas (2018) ===
Singh is known for his vocal anti-Muslim views, which includes calling them traitors and backing the shooting of Rohingya people. In a video message, he said that 'illegal' Rohingya Muslims and Bangladeshis should be shot dead if they didn't leave the country respectfully, and labelled them as pests.

=== Facebook ban (2020) ===
On 2 September 2020, Facebook designated Singh a "dangerous individual" and permanently banned him from all its platforms, citing his repeated hate speech and incitement of violence.

=== Prophet Muhammad Remarks and Arrests (2022) ===
Amid the 2022 Muhammad remarks controversy, Singh was arrested by the Hyderabad Police on 23 August 2022, hours after his comments about Muhammad sparked protests in the city. He was subsequently suspended from BJP for violating party norms. He was released on bail the same evening but later arrested again on 25 August 2022. In October 2023, the BJP revoked his suspension ahead of the assembly elections in Telangana.

=== Remarks at Shiv Jayanti which led to Rioting (2023) ===
In 2023, during Shiv Jayanti celebrations in Shrirampur, Ahmednagar district, Singh made provocative remarks against Muslims that led to communal clashes in the area.

=== Violations of the Model Code of Conduct during Elections (2024) ===
Singh was booked multiple times for violating the Model Code of Conduct during the 2024 Indian general elections, by allegedly singing Islamophobic songs during an unauthorised rally in Afzal Gunj on 18 April 2024, and for conducting a rally beyond the permitted time in Khanapur on 8 May 2024.

=== Threats against comedian Daniel Fernandes (2024) ===
In June 2024, he threatened Bombay-based comedian Daniel Fernandes for making jokes against Jains. Following the threats, Fernandes was forced to cancel his show in Hyderabad. The incident drew criticism for curbing freedom of expression.

=== Remarks against Muslims in Goa (2024) ===
In December 2024, during a visit to Goa, Singh urged Christians to join Hindus in resisting what he described as "love jihad" and the growing Muslim population in the state. He tore up a Bangladeshi flag during the speech, which further intensified the controversy.

=== Calls for violence to establish a Hindu Rashtra ===
Singh has repeatedly advocated for the establishment of a Hindu Rashtra (Hindu nation) by armed means, further fuelling criticism of his extremist rhetoric.
