= Boggulkunta =

- neighbourhood
- Location in Hyderabad, India Boggulkunta (India)
- Coordinates: 17.391222°N 78.478317°E
- Country: India
- State: Telangana
- District: Hyderabad
- Metro: Hyderabad

Government
  - Body: GHMC

Languages
  - Official: Telugu
- Time zone: UTC+5:30 (IST)
- PIN: 500 001
- Lok Sabha constituency: Hyderabad
- Vidhan Sabha constituency: Goshamahal
- Planning agency: GHMC

Boggulkunta is a commercial area in Hyderabad, the capital city of Telangana, India. It lies between the commercial areas of Abids and Koti.

== Commercial area and hospitals ==
It is surrounded by Abids and Koti. There is a very old church of Medak diocese built by Posnett and besides this church, the church owned building 'Posnett Bhavan' let out to the government and private agencies is available. In the third floor of the building there is the Directorate of Census Operations, Telangana office.

The Fernandez Maternity Hospital is located over here. The King Koti Palace is also located here. The King Koti palace has a unique Gate known as "Pardha Gate". Once the Nizam of Hyderabad used to reside in this very Palace.

Very recently Kameneni Hospitals has been established which is becoming increasingly popular in the Hyderabad city. There are some popular restaurants like Kolani's Kitchen and Mayur Pan shop etc.

== Transport ==
The state run TSRTC has a big bus junction at close by koti to all parts of the city. The closest MMTS Train Station is at Kachiguda or Malakpet.

== School ==
There is an educational institute named Pragathi Mahavidyalaya which has a college and a school.
