= Goshamahal =

Goshamahal Goshamahal Topkhana
- Suburb
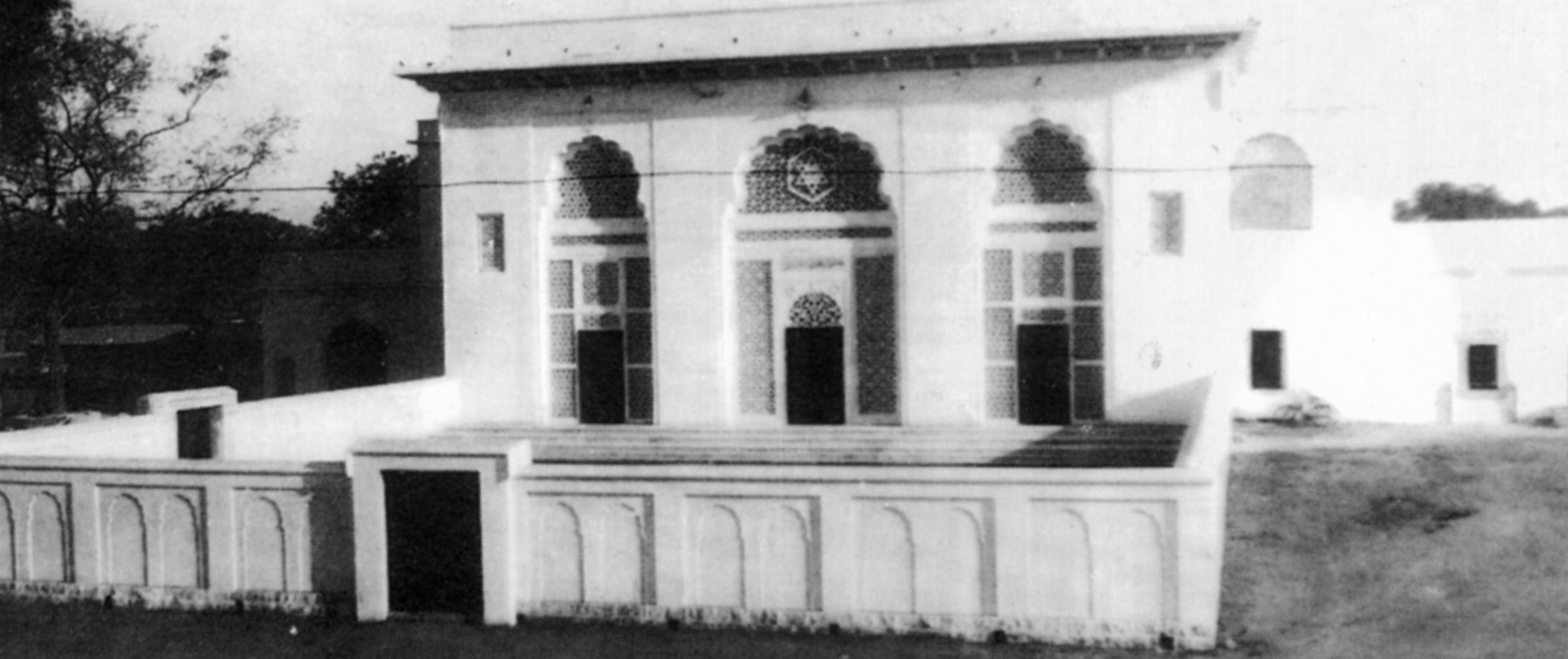
- Gosha Mahal Baradari in 1920s

- Location in Telangana, India Goshamahal (Telangana) Goshamahal (India)
- Country: India
- State: Telangana
- District: Hyderabad District

Government
  - Type: democratic
  - Body: GHMC
  - MLA: T. Raja Singh BJP
  - Member of Parliament: Asaduddin Owaisi (AIMIM)
  - Rank: 2nd

Languages
  - Official: Telugu
- Time zone: UTC+5:30 (IST)
- Postal code: 500012
- Vehicle registration: TG
- Lok Sabha constituency: Hyderabad
- Vidhan Sabha constituency: Goshamahal
- Planning agency: GHMC
- Website: telangana.gov.in

Goshamahal is a suburb in Hyderabad City, Telangana, India.

Derived from the word gosha meaning secluded women in purdah. The Goshamahal Baradari is probably the only well preserved palace built by the Qutb Shahi rulers, as almost all their palaces were destroyed during the long siege of the kingdom by Aurangzeb. It was built by the last Qutb Shahi ruler, Sultan Abul Hassan Tana Shah in 1684. Apparently, during Aurangzeb's conquest of the Deccan, he installed his son Shah Alam in this palace, which later served as the Mughal headquarters in the south.

Later, in the early 20th century, the 7th Nizam of Hyderabad handed this palace over to the Freemasons of Hyderabad and Secunderabad and it has been in their care ever since.
