= Dhoolpet =

- Inner city
- Location in Hyderabad, India
- Coordinates: 17°22′28″N 78°27′39″E
- Country: India
- State: Telangana
- District: Hyderabad
- Metro: Hyderabad

Government
  - Body: GHMC
  - MLA: T. Raja Singh (BJP)
  - Member of Parliament: Asaduddin Owaisi

Languages
  - Official: Telugu
- Time zone: UTC+5:30 (IST)
- PIN: 500 006
- Lok Sabha constituency: Hyderabad
- Vidhan Sabha constituency: Goshamahal
- Planning agency: GHMC

Dhoolpet is a neighbourhood in the Old City of Hyderabad India, partly inhabited by people who migrated from Uttar Pradesh during the Nizam rule. Dhoolpet is part of Goshamahal Assembly constituency in old city. Dhoolpet has a sizeable Hindu migrant population, drawn from north India and Gujarat, among which Lodha community is dominant. 52-feet Hanuman statue is located at Sri Akashpuri Hanuman Mandir in Dhoolpet.

The area is well known for illegal bootlegging. The Jummerat Bazaar (Thursday Market) is a flea market held every Thursday in Dhoolpet.

== Transport ==
Dhoolpet, situated near Afzalgunj, is connected by TSRTC buses (80 from Afzalgunj and 1J and 2J from Sec'bad). The closest MMTS train station is Nampally railway station.
