= Mahbubnagar–Ranga Reddy–Hyderabad Graduates constituency =

Graduates constituency of the Telangana Legislative Council, India

Mahbubnagar–Ranga Reddy–Hyderabad Graduates
- Indian electoral constituency

Constituency details
- Country: India
- Region: South India
- State: Telangana
- Established: 2007
- Reservation: None
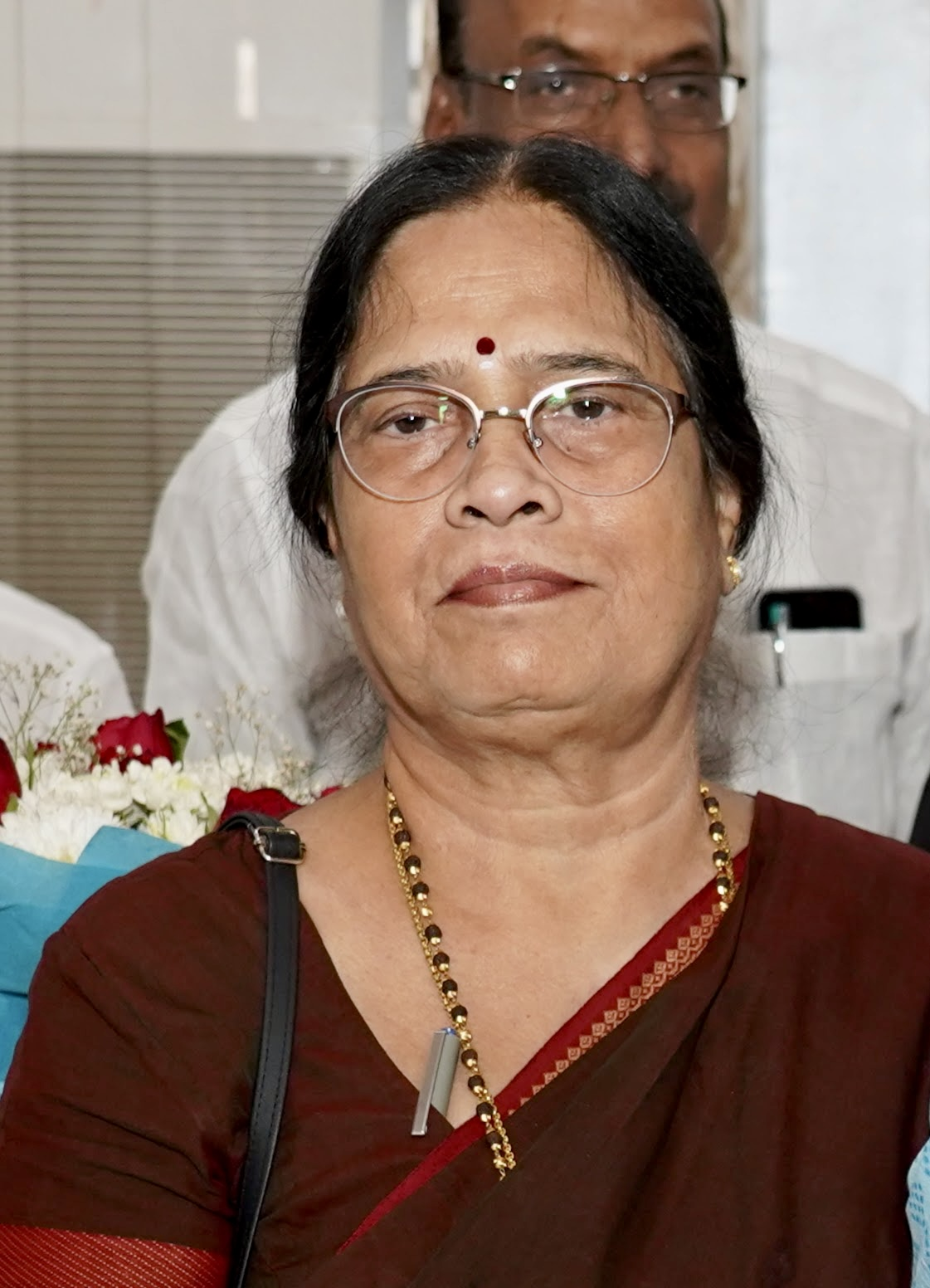
- Party: BRS
- Elected year: 2021

Mahbubnagar–Ranga Reddy–Hyderabad Graduates constituency is a constituency in Mahabubnagar district, Ranga Reddy district, Hyderabad district, Medchal-Malkajgiri district, Vikarabad district, Nagarkurnool district, Wanaparthy district, Narayanpet district and Jogulamba Gadwal district of Telangana that elects representatives to the Telangana Legislative Council in India. It is one of the three council constituencies representing graduates.

K. Nageshwar won the seat twice in 2007 and 2009. He was the longest-serving and the only member to be elected during the unified Andhra Pradesh. N. Ramchander Rao became the first elected member after the creation of Telangana.

== Districts ==
District
Mahabubnagar
Ranga Reddy
Hyderabad
Medchal-Malkajgiri
Vikarabad
Nagarkurnool
Wanaparthy
Narayanpet
Jogulamba Gadwal

== Members of the Legislative Council ==
Year	Member	Political party
2007	K. Nageshwar	Independent
2009	K. Nageshwar	Independent
2015	N. Ramchander Rao	Bharatiya Janta Party
2021	Surabhi Vani Devi	Bharat Rashtra Samithi
