= G. Kishan Reddy =

Indian politician (born 1960)

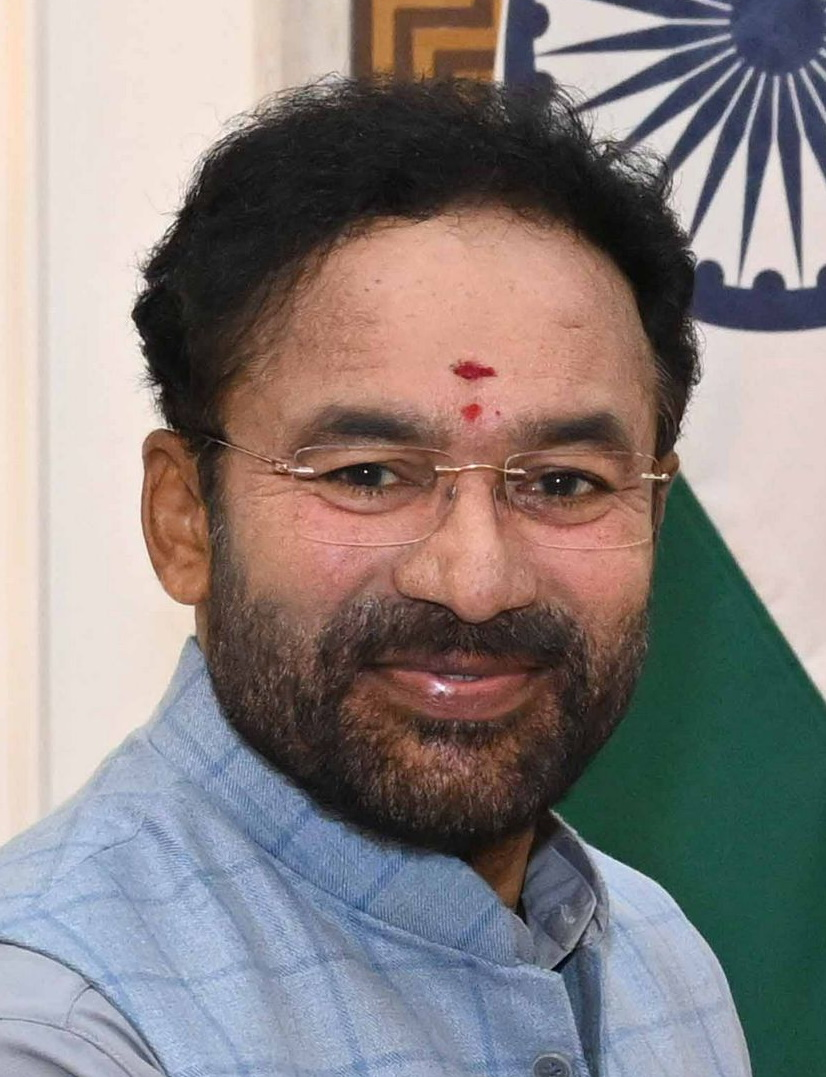
- Official portrait, 2024

25th Union Minister of Coal
- Incumbent
- Assumed office 9 June 2024
- President: Droupadi Murmu
- Prime Minister: Narendra Modi
- Preceded by: Pralhad Joshi

45th Union Minister of Mines
- Incumbent
- Assumed office 9 June 2024
- Prime Minister: Narendra Modi
- Preceded by: Pralhad Joshi

34th Union Minister of Tourism
- In office 7 July 2021 – 9 June 2024
- Prime Minister: Narendra Modi
- Preceded by: Prahlad Singh Patel
- Succeeded by: Gajendra Singh Shekhawat

12th Union Minister of Culture
- In office 7 July 2021 – 9 June 2024
- Prime Minister: Narendra Modi
- Preceded by: Prahlad Singh Patel
- Succeeded by: Gajendra Singh Shekhawat

9th Union Minister of Development of the North Eastern Region
- In office 7 July 2021 – 9 June 2024
- Prime Minister: Narendra Modi
- Preceded by: Dr. Jitendra Singh
- Succeeded by: Jyotiraditya Scindia

48th Union Minister of State for Home Affairs
- In office 30 May 2019 – 7 July 2021 Serving with H. G. Ahir (till 2019); Nityanand Rai (from 2019)
- Prime Minister: Narendra Modi
- Minister: Amit Shah
- Preceded by: Kiren Rijiju
- Succeeded by: Nisith Pramanik; A. K. Mishra

Member of Parliament, Lok Sabha
- Incumbent
- Assumed office 23 May 2019
- Preceded by: Bandaru Dattatreya
- Constituency: Secunderabad, Telangana

Member of Telangana Legislative Assembly
- In office 2 June 2014 – 11 December 2018
- Preceded by: Constituency shifted from Andhra Pradesh
- Succeeded by: Kaleru Venkatesham
- Constituency: Amberpet

1st President of Bharatiya Janata Party, Telangana
- In office 4 July 2023 – 30 June 2025
- National President: J. P. Nadda
- Preceded by: Bandi Sanjay Kumar
- Succeeded by: N. Ramchander Rao
- In office 2 June 2014 – 8 April 2016
- National President: Rajnath Singh; Amit Shah
- Preceded by: Office established (himself as President of United Andhra)
- Succeeded by: K. Laxman

9th President of Bharatiya Janata Party, Andhra Pradesh
- In office 8 March 2010 – 1 June 2014
- National President: Nitin Gadkari; Rajnath Singh
- Preceded by: Bandaru Dattatreya
- Succeeded by: Kambhampati Hari Babu (of bifurcated Andhra)

Member of Andhra Pradesh Legislative Assembly
- In office 16 May 2009 – 1 June 2014
- Preceded by: Constituency established
- Succeeded by: Constituency shifted to Telangana
- Constituency: Amberpet
- In office 11 May 2004 – 16 May 2009
- Preceded by: C. Krishna Yadav
- Succeeded by: Constituency bifurcated as per Delimitation Act, 2002
- Constituency: Himayatnagar

9th President of the Bharatiya Janata Yuva Morcha
- In office 2002–2005
- Preceded by: Shivraj Singh Chouhan
- Succeeded by: Dharmendra Pradhan

Personal details
- Born: Gangapuram Kishan Reddy; 15 June 1960 (age 66) Kandukur, Andhra Pradesh, India (present-day Telangana)
- Party: Bharatiya Janata Party (since 1980)
- Other political affiliations: Janata Party (1977–1980)
- Spouse: G. Kavya (m. 1995)
- Children: 2
- Education: Diploma, CITD

Gangapuram Kishan Reddy (born 15 June 1960) is an Indian politician who is serving as the 25th Minister of Coal and 45th Minister of Mines since 2024. He also served as Minister of Tourism, Culture and Development of North Eastern Region of India from 2019 to 2024. He is a member of the Bharatiya Janata Party since 1980. He is an MP representing Secunderabad (Lok Sabha constituency) since 2019. He served as the floor leader of the BJP in the Andhra Pradesh Legislative Assembly in 2009 and gave it up after being elected as the state BJP president of erstwhile Andhra Pradesh. He was first state president of Telangana BJP from 2014 to 2016, appointed again as Telangana BJP president on 4 July 2023 and served till 30 June 2025.

== Personal life and education ==
Gangapuram Kishan Reddy, was born in Timmapur village in Rangareddy district of Telangana to G. Swamy Reddy and Andalamma. He is married to Kavya Reddy and has two children, a daughter and a son. He did a diploma in tool design from CITD.

== Early political career ==
Reddy started his political career as a youth leader of the Janta Party in 1977.

Once the BJP was formed in 1980, he joined the party full time. He became the state treasurer of the state Bharatiya Janata Yuva Morcha, Andhra Pradesh.

- From 1982 to 1983 he was Bharatiya Janata Party Andhra Pradesh Yuva Morcha State Treasurer
- From 1983 to 1984 he was Bharatiya Janata Party State Secretary, Bharatiya Janata Yuva Morcha, Andhra Pradesh
- From 1986 to 1990 he was the State President, Bharatiya Janata Yuva Morcha, Andhra Pradesh
- From 1990 to 1992 he was the National Secretary, Bharatiya Janata Yuva Morcha & In-charge of the South India
- From 1992 to 1994 he was the National Vice President of the Bharatiya Janata Yuva Morcha
- From 1994 to 2001 he was the National General Secretary of the Bharatiya Janata Yuva Morcha
- From 2001 to 2002 he was the State Treasurer, State Spokesperson & Head Quarter Incharge of Bharatiya Janata Party, Andhra Pradesh
- From 2002 to 2004 he was the National President of the BJYM
- From 2004 to 2005 he was the State GS and official spokesperson, BJP Andhra Pradesh.

== Electoral History ==
Year	Constituency	Party	Votes	%	Opponent	Opponent Party	Opponent Votes	%	Result	Margin	%
1999	Karwan	BJP	50,064	31.84	Syed Sajjad	AIMIM	76,575	48.72	Lost	-26,511	-16.88
2004	Himayatnagar	BJP	55,338	49.30	Govind Giri	TRS	23,577	21.00	Won	31,761	28.30
2009	Amberpet	BJP	59,134	44.90	Mohd. Fareeduddin	INC	31,891	24.20	Won	27,243	20.70
2014	Amberpet	BJP	81,430	48.60	Aedla Sudhakar Reddy	TRS	18,832	11.20	Won	62,598	37.40
2018	Amberpet	BJP	60,542	41.50	Kaleru Venkatesh	TRS	61,558	42.20	Lost	-1,016	-0.70
2019	Secunderabad	BJP	384,780	42.05	Talasani Sai Kiran Yadav	TRS	322,666	35.26	Won	62,114	6.79
2024	Secunderabad	BJP	473,012	45.15	Danam Nagender	INC	423,068	40.38	Won	49,944	4.77

== Rise in state politics ==
=== Member of Legislative Assembly and Floor leader ===
Between 2004 and 2009 he was the MLA, Himayatnagar Constituency, Floor Leader of BJP in State Assembly. In 2009, when Himayatnagar (Assembly constituency) was abolished and largely replaced by Khairatabad Assembly constituency, Reddy contested from Amberpet Assembly Constituency. From 2009 to 2014 he was the MLA, Amberpet Assembly Constituency, Floor Leader of BJP in State Assembly. He was elected in 2009 to the Amberpet assembly constituency with a majority of over 27,000 votes.

=== President of State BJP ===
From 2010 to 2014, he was the BJP State President of the Andhra Pradesh. He was unanimously elected as the Telangana BJP president, as an inaugural holder.

Reddy, began the 22-day Telangana "Poru Yatra"– a 3,500-kilometre (2,200 mi) journey through 986 villages and 88 assembly constituencies stressing the need for a stance on Telangana state – on 19 January.

== Union minister of India ==
He was elected MP in the Lok Sabha from Secunderabad constituency in 2019 and 2024.

=== Minister of State ===
On 30 May 2019, he was sworn in as Union Minister of State (MoS) for Home Affairs in the Government of India. From 2019 to 2021 Minister of State for Home Affairs, Government of India, serving along with Nityanand Rai.

Considering the increase in demand for local public transport, he wrote a letter to the chief minister of Telangana, K. Chandrashekar Rao, urging him to resume MMTS services in the city.

=== Union Cabinet Minister ===
- Minister of Tourism (2021-2024)
- Minister of Culture (2021-2024)
- Minister of Development of North Eastern Region (2021-2024)

On 18 June 2022, the union Tourism Minister G Kishan Reddy explaining the training process of Agnipath Scheme at a press conference, stated that the people selected as Agniveers would be given training for the "skills of drivers, washermen, barbers, electricians and other professionals". The video clip of the remark became viral. Reddy said that there would be drivers, electricians, barbers and thousands other posts and people selected under this scheme, would be helpful in those jobs. A reporter noted that Skill Development Corporations was already established to train youth with different skills, Reddy answered that such skills would be imparted in Agnipath scheme as well.

- Minister of Coal (2024–present)
- Minister of Mines (2024–present)

In 2024, he took charge as the Union Minister of Mines and Union Minister of Coal in the Third Modi ministry.

== Return to state politics ==
On 5 July 2023, Reddy was re-appointed the State President of the Bharatiya Janata Party in Telangana. He succeeded Bandi Sanjay Kumar. This reshuffle came after weeks of infighting between various factions of the party.

Lok Sabha
Preceded by Bandaru Dattatreya	Member of Parliament for Secunderabad; 2019 – Present	Incumbent
Political offices
Preceded by Prahlad Singh Patel; Minister of State with Independent Charge	Minister of Tourism; 7 July 2021 – Present	Incumbent
Preceded by Prahlad Singh Patel; Minister of State with Independent Charge	Minister of Culture; 7 July 2021 – Present	Incumbent
Preceded by Jitendra Singh; Minister of State with Independent Charge	Minister of Development of North Eastern Region; 7 July 2021 – Present	Incumbent
