= Prem Singh Rathore =

Indian politician

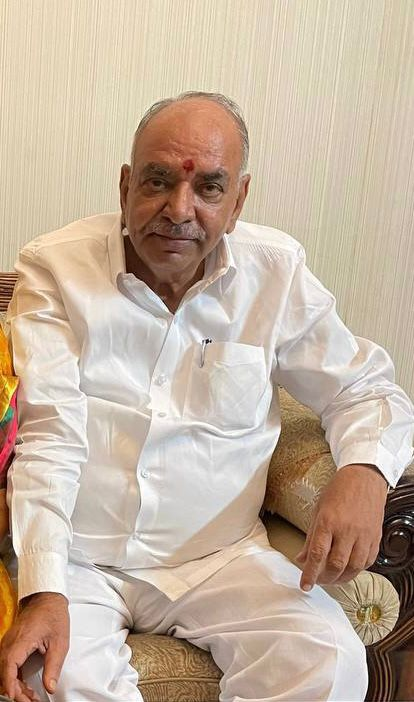
- Rathore in 2022

Chairman of the Musi Riverfront Development Corporation (Cabinet Minister)
- In office 2017–2023
- Premier: K. Chandrashekar Rao

Member of the Andhra Pradesh Legislative Assembly
- In office 1999–2004
- Constituency: Maharajgunj

Personal details
- Party: Bharatiya Janata Party (?–2004; 2013–2016; 2023–present)
- Other political affiliations: Telugu Desam Party (?–1994); Bharat Rashtra Samithi (2016–2023)
- Education: Osmania University
- Occupation: Politician, Social worker

Thakur Prem Singh Rathore is an Indian politician from Hyderabad, Telangana. A member of the Bharatiya Janata Party (BJP), he previously served as a Member of the Andhra Pradesh Legislative Assembly representing the Maharajgunj constituency (now Goshamahal Assembly constituency) from 1984 to 2004. On 24 April 2024, he was appointed as the BJP's Lok Sabha Co-ordinator for Hyderabad and its surrounding constituencies.

During his political career, Rathore served as the BJP's State Vice President and General Secretary in united Andhra Pradesh, as well as the City President of Hyderabad. He was also a member of the Telangana Rashtra Samithi (TRS), during which time he served as the first Chairman of the Musi Riverfront Development Corporation with a cabinet ministerial rank.

== Political career ==
Rathore began his political career with the Telugu Desam Party (TDP) before switching allegiance to the BJP. Ahead of the 1999 Andhra Pradesh Legislative Assembly election, he was recommended by the then-Vice President of India, Bhairon Singh Shekhawat, for the BJP ticket in the Maharajgunj constituency. Rathore won the election, and his tenure was noted for various developmental works within the constituency.

In the 2009 state assembly elections, his declared net worth stemming from various businesses and assets. This wealth became a focal point in the campaign, and he was ultimately defeated by his opponent, Mukesh Goud.

From 2013 to 2016, Rathore served as the BJP City President for Hyderabad. During his leadership, the BJP won five assembly constituencies in the city. In 2016, Rathore resigned from the BJP, alleging that the party was "selling" tickets to newcomers and side-lining veterans. He subsequently joined the Telangana Rashtra Samithi (TRS). Following his departure, the BJP's seat count in the city dropped to just one in the 2018 elections.

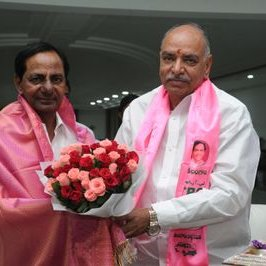
Prem Singh Rathore in 2018 with the Chief Minister of Telangana, K. Chandrashekar Rao

Under the TRS government, Chief Minister K. Chandrashekar Rao appointed Rathore as the chairman of the Musi Riverfront Development Corporation. This cabinet-rank position tasked him with overseeing the cleanup and beautification of the Musi riverfront.

Rathore contested the 2018 Telangana Legislative Assembly election as the TRS candidate for Goshamahal but lost to the BJP's T. Raja Singh.

In 2023, just prior to the Telangana state elections, Rathore rejoined the BJP. His return was credited with shifting swing votes in Goshamahal, which significantly aided T. Raja Singh in securing his third consecutive term.

== Social work ==
Rathore is known for organizing and funding religious services in Hyderabad. He serves as the President of the Vishwa Jagruti Mission, which operates an ashram in Narsingi. Additionally, he actively assists Rajput migrants settling in Hyderabad with housing, employment, and financial support.

== Controversies ==
Rathore's political career has been marked by several controversies and clashes with rivals. Former Minister Mukesh Goud accused Rathore of promoting the agenda of Bal Thackeray in Hyderabad, referring to him as a "Hindu extremist goon".

He has faced multiple arrests, including detentions during the Telangana movement and during a protest against Chief Minister Y. S. Rajasekhara Reddy, whom Rathore controversially labeled an "agent of the Vatican".

In 2002, during a police raid targeting street vendors in Begum Bazar, local residents called upon Rathore for help. He intervened and blocked the police from entering the lane. The situation escalated to the point where the then-Police Commissioner of Hyderabad had to personally visit the site to arrest him, as subordinate officers hesitated. During an interview with eTV, a senior police officer highlighted Rathore's local influence, stating, "We can arrest Naidu [the Chief Minister], but not Rathoreji; there is a fear of him in Hyderabad." The standoff ended only after Bandaru Dattatreya, then a Union Minister and senior BJP leader, intervened and persuaded Rathore to stand down. Consequently, Rathore was charged under Indian Penal Code (IPC) Section 188 (Disobedience to an order duly promulgated by a public servant) and IPC Section 283 (Danger or obstruction in a public way).

In 2013, Rathore was booked by police for allegedly making threatening remarks against a Cantonment CEO.
