= Muralidhar Rao =

BJP National General Secretary

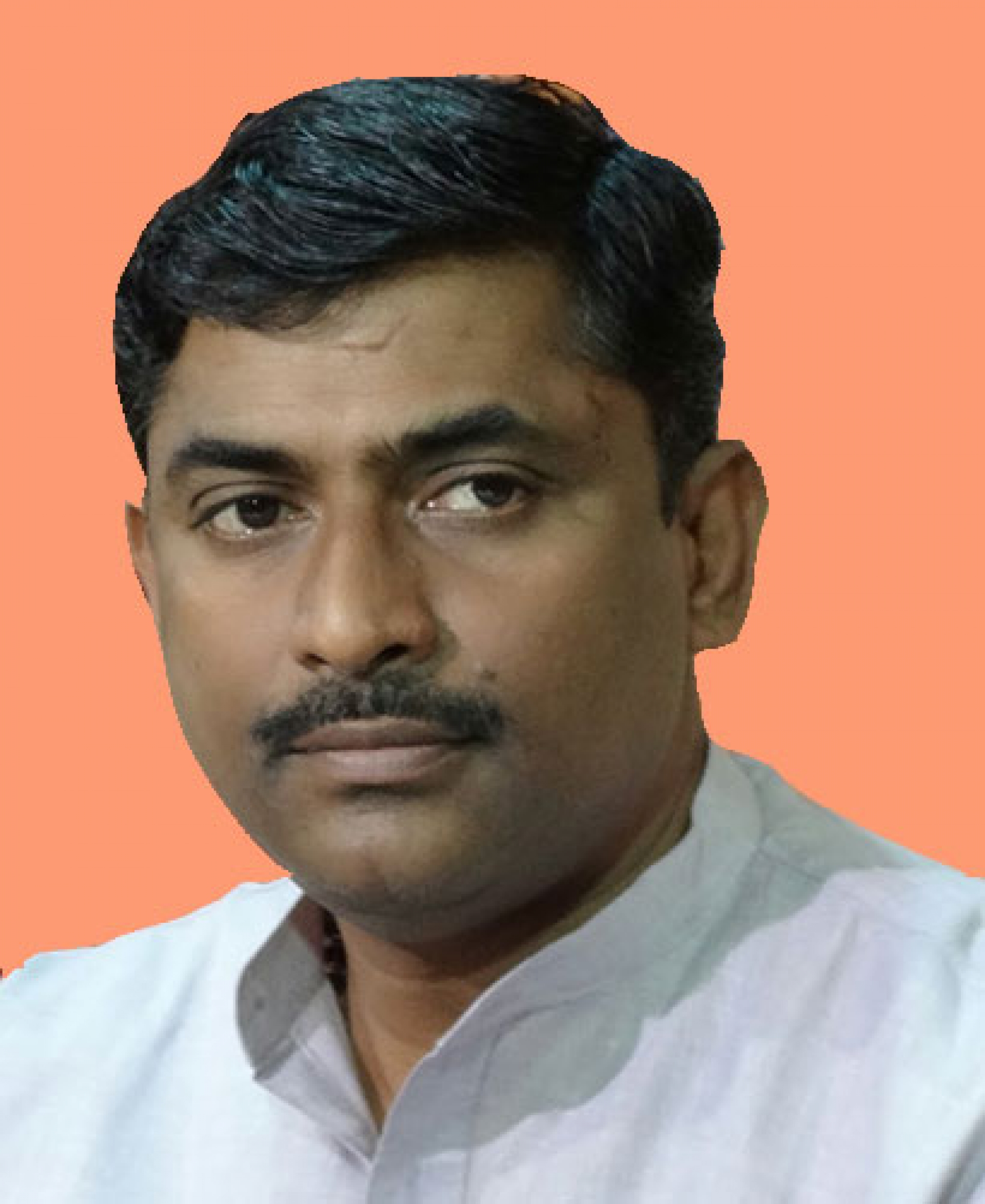

National General Secretary of the Bharatiya Janata Party
- In office 2013–2020
- President: Amit Shah; J. P. Nadda

National Secretary of the Bharatiya Janata Party
- In office 2010–2013

Personal details
- Born: Polsani Muralidhar Rao; 17 July 1965 (age 61) Korapalli, Andhra Pradesh (now in Telangana), India
- Party: Bharathiya Janata Party (2009-present)
- Education: Osmania University
- Website: muralidharrao.in

Polsani Muralidhar Rao is an Indian political activist and politician, he served as a National General Secretary of the Bharatiya Janata Party (BJP) from 2013 to 2020. Prior to joining the BJP, Rao was active in the Swadeshi Jagaran Manch, where he was its Organising Secretary, as well as in other affiliates of the organisation Rashtriya Swayamsevak Sangh.

== Life ==
Muralidhar Rao is the son of a farmer at Korapalli village in Karimnagar district. He did his undergraduate studies in Warangal and postgraduate studies in Osmania University, Hyderabad, receiving an MA and M. Phil in Philosophy. As a student leader of ABVP, he was a target of the Naxalites who shot him and about 18 pellets still remain in his body.

== Political career ==
Rao joined the Indian cultural volunteer organisation Rashtriya Swayamsevak Sangh at a young age and became its pracharak (full-time worker). Deputed to northern states by the RSS, he was recognised for his skills in organising students. While at Osmania University, he served as the Gen Secretary of Arts College students' union and an activist of Akhil Bharatiya Vidyarthi Parishad.

Muralidhar Rao joined the RSS at a very young age. He led ABVP in Warangal and Hyderabad. He was general secretary of Osmania University Students' Union in 1984.

Heading North

The ABVP deputed him to Rajasthan in 1987. His remarkable organising skills won him laurels of late Bhairon Singh Shekawat.

Fighting insurgents

The ABVP moved him to J&K in 1991, when there were pressing demands due to insurgency. He rallied the youth against fundamentalist forces, despite threats to his life from jihadists.

=== Swadeshi Jagaran Manch ===
He assisted RSS leaders Dattopant Thengadi, Madan Das and S Gurumurthy in floating Swadeshi Jagaran Manch, a movement to protect Indian rural economy against the onslaught of globalisation.

=== Bharatiya Janata Party ===
Muralidhar Rao joined BJP in January 2009 as attaché to the then president Rajnath Singh. In 2010, he was made national secretary by Nitin Gadkari. Appointed one of the BJP general secretaries on 1 March 2013. Muralidhar Rao was also in contention for the post of the BJP President, after the 2014 Lok Sabha elections saw Rajnath Singh becoming the Union Home Minister. In 2019 he played crucial role for the BJP.

Positions held

- 2009: Attaché to Rajnath Singh, BJP President.
- 2010: National secretary, BJP
- 2013: National General-Secretary, BJP
