= N. Ramchander Rao =

Indian politician (born 1959)

President of Bharatiya Janata Party – Telangana
- Incumbent
- Assumed office 1 July 2025
- President: J. P. Nadda; Nitin Nabin
- Preceded by: G. Kishan Reddy

Member of Legislative Council, Telangana
- In office 30 March 2015 – 29 March 2021
- Preceded by: K. Nageshwar
- Succeeded by: Surabhi Vani Devi
- Constituency: Mahbubnagar–Ranga Reddy–Hyderabad Graduates

Personal details
- Born: Naraparaju Ramchander Rao; 27 April 1959 (age 67) Hyderabad, Andhra Pradesh, India
- Party: Bharatiya Janata Party
- Spouse: Savithri
- Children: 2
- Education: Osmania University; Master of Arts; Bachelor of Laws
- Profession: Advocate, Politician

Naraparaju Ramchander Rao (born 27 April 1959) is an Indian politician and senior advocate from Telangana. He serves as the current president of the Bharatiya Janata Party Telangana state unit. He has been a member of Bar council of Andhra Pradesh from the year 2006 to 2019 and also served as member of Bar Council of India during the year 2011 to 2019. He has been nominated as BJP Telangana state president on 30th June 2025. He earlier served as the Member of Telangana Legislative Council (MLC) for Mahbubnagar–Ranga Reddy–Hyderabad Graduates constituency from 2015 to 2021. He also served as the membership drive incharge of Bharatiya Janata Party, Telangana before assuming the post of the president.

Ramchander Rao started his legal practice in Hyderabad in the year 1986 and was later designated as senior advocate in the year 2012 by the erstwhile High Court of Andhra Pradesh. In the year 2011, he was elected as a member of the Bar Council of India. He has also been BJP's Chief Spokesperson and the General Secretary of undivided Andhra Pradesh State.

== Electoral history ==
Year	Constituency	Party	Votes	%	Opponent	Party	Votes	%	Result	Margin	%
2009	Mahbubnagar–Ranga Reddy–Hyderabad (MLC)	BJP	45,120	23.15	K. Nageshwar	IND	59,840	30.70	Lost	-14,720	-7.55
2014	Malkajgiri	BJP	53,702	27.24	C. Kanaka Reddy	TRS	56,470	28.64	Lost	-2,768	-1.40
2015	Mahbubnagar–Ranga Reddy–Hyderabad (MLC)	BJP	58,048	39.51	Devi Prasad Rao	TRS	37,978	25.85	Won	+20,070	+13.66
2018	Malkajgiri	BJP	40,451	19.31	Mynampally Hanumantha Rao	TRS	1,14,149	54.49	Lost	-73,698	-35.18
2019	Malkajgiri (MP)	BJP	3,04,282	19.47	A. Revanth Reddy	INC	5,23,822	33.53	Lost	-2,19,540	-14.06
2021	Mahbubnagar–Ranga Reddy–Hyderabad (MLC)	BJP	1,04,685	29.27	Surabhi Vani Devi	TRS	1,49,271	41.73	Lost	-44,586	-12.46
2023	Malkajgiri	BJP	55,427	20.88	Marri Rajasekhar Reddy	BRS	1,25,049	47.12	Lost	-69,622	-26.24

== Family ==
Ramchander Rao born in a Brahmin Family Hailing from Nallabandagudem near Kodad, Suryapet district. Ramchander Rao's father, Professor NVRLN Rao, was Dean of the Faculty of Engineering for Osmania University. His daughter Amuktha Naraparaju is an AVP at a software consulting firm. His son Avaneesh Naraparaju is a practicing lawyer at Telangana High Court. His wife Savithri died in 2017 from prolonged illness.

== Early life ==
Mr. Ramchander Rao had attended his early education in Ranchi, Jharkhand (erstwhile Bihar state) as Rao’s father was working at Birla Institute of Technology, Mesra as a professor and later he attended Kendriya Vidyalaya in Secunderabad wherein he had completed his school education.

Thereafter, mr. Rao had pursued BA in Railway Degree College Secunderabad in 1980. For three consecutive years, he was elected President of the Students' Union (affiliated to Akhil Bharatiya Vidyarthi Parishad, (ABVP)) while studying Bachelor of Arts at Railway Degree College.

He secured a Master of Arts (Political Science) from Osmania University in 1982, wherein he stood second in the entrance examinations. He later earned an LLB degree from Osmania University in the year 1985. For two terms, he was elected as secretary (ABVP) of Osmania Law College Student Union.

He was jailed 14 times during his student years.

== Publications ==
- He used to write a column on Sundays named "Legal Corner" in Andhra Jyothy.
- He authored several legal articles to law journals such as Andhra Legal Digest and Andhra Pradesh Legal Journal.
- He has contributed articles to Jana Sandesh
- He has also written many books, the most recent one was on his debates and discussions in the Telangana Legislative Council.

== Positions ==
- 1977-80—President of Students Union, Railway Degree College
- 1982-85— Secretary of Students Union, Osmania University
- 1st State secretary for the Bharatiya Janata Yuva Morcha
- Legal Cell Convener for AP state BJP Unit.
- Joint convener for National Legal Cell
- 2008- —State spokesperson for Bharatiya Janata Party, for undivided Andhra Pradesh
- 2011-2013—Andhra Pradesh State General secretary.
- 2011-19 - Member, Bar Council of India
- 2015-21 - MLC, Telangana for Rangareddy, Mahabubnagar & Hyderabad
- 2017-20- President, BJP Hyderabad
- 2024-Telangana State BJP membership in-charge
- 1 July 2025 - Telangana BJP President

== Legislature ==
Rao lost the 2009 election for Member of Legislative Council (MLC) for the Graduates’ constituency for Hyderabad, Ranga Reddy and Mahabubnagar districts. He contested in 2014 from Malkajgiri, for Member of Legislative Assembly and lost by a narrow margin. In 2015, he won as Member of Legislative Council (MLC) from Mahabubnagar, Ranga Reddy, Hyderabad Graduates Constituency in Telangana as a BJP candidate. Rao lost to Surabhi Vani Devi in 2021 Mahabubnagar-Rangareddy-Hyderabad Graduates’ constituency elections.
