= Telangana Rakshana Sena =

- Abbreviation: TRS
- President: K. Kavitha
- Founded: 25 April 2026 (3 months ago)
- Split from: Bharat Rashtra Samithi
- Ideology: Regionalism
- Political position: Centre
- Colours: Yellow
- ECI status: Unregistered Party
- Seats in Rajya Sabha: 0 / 245
- Seats in Lok Sabha: 0 / 543
- Seats in Telangana Legislative Council: 0 / 40
- Seats in Telangana Legislative Assembly: 0 / 119
- Number of states and union territories in government: 0 / 31

Website
- www.trs-online.com

Telangana Rakshana Sena (transl. Telangana Protection Force; abbr. TRS) is an Indian political party in the state of Telangana. K. Kavitha, daughter of former Telangana Chief Minister K. Chandrashekar Rao, launched her party on 25 April 2026 at Advaya Convention in Medchal.

== History ==
After Bharat Rashtra Samithi defeat in 2023 Telangana Legislative Assembly election difference in opinions came up between K. Chandrashekhar Rao, K. T. Rama Rao and K. Kavitha. In 2025, she was suspended from BRS. Then in 2026, she floated a new party Telangana Rashtra Sena on 25 April 2026.

In January 2026 following standard Election Commission of India protocol, Kavitha proposed five names for the party: “Telangana Praja Jagruthi,” “Telangana Jagruthi,” “Telangana Rakshana Sena,” “Telangana Rashtra Jagruthi,” and “Telangana Praja Shakti.” Among these on 30 April 2026 the Election Commission of India granted approval for “Telangana Rakshana Sena (TRS).”
