= Surabhi Vani Devi =

Indian politician, academic and artist

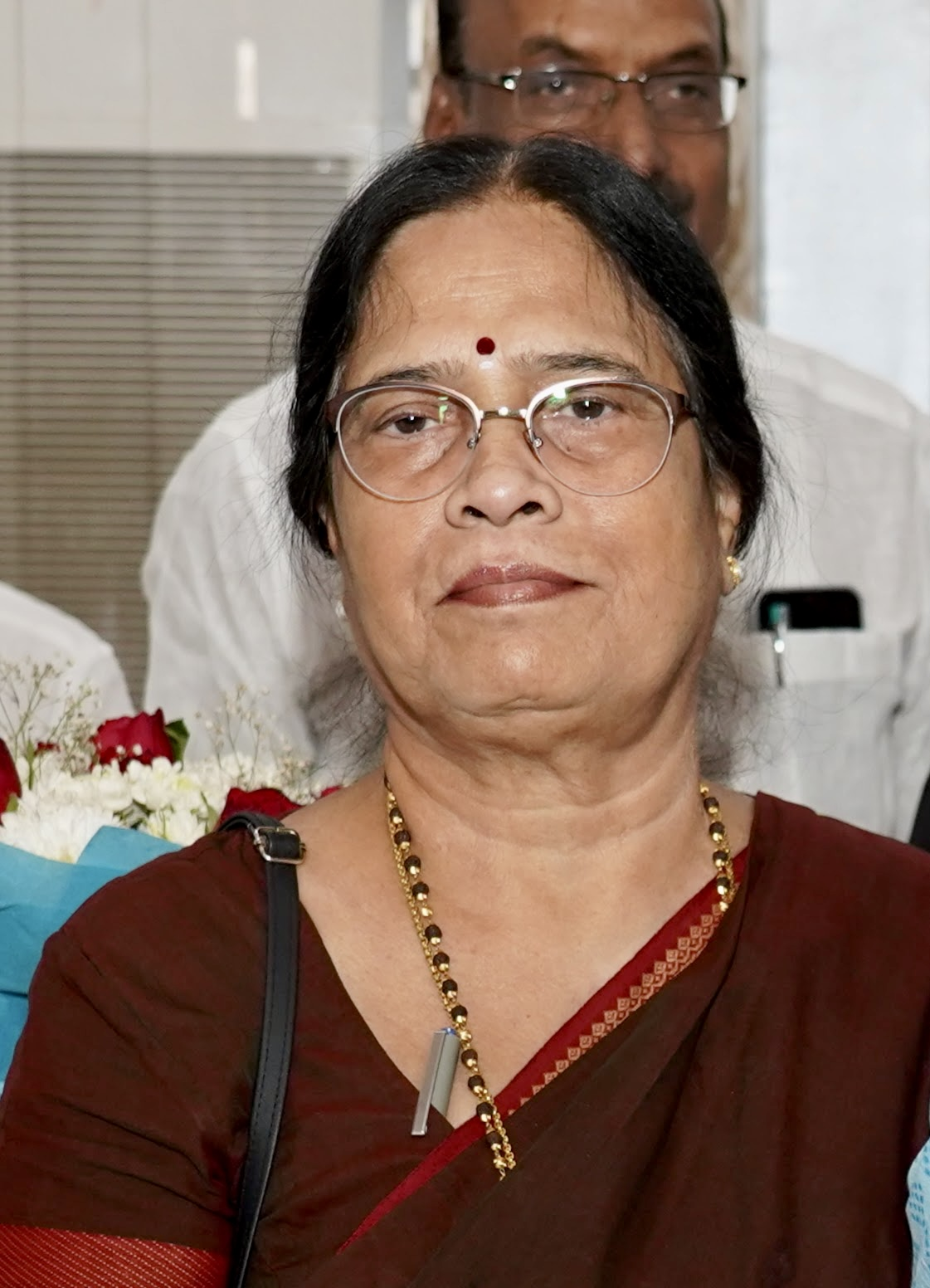

Member of Legislative Council, Telangana
- Incumbent
- Assumed office 30 March 2021
- Preceded by: N. Ramchander Rao
- Constituency: Mahbubnagar–Ranga Reddy–Hyderabad Graduates

Personal details
- Born: 1 April 1952 (age 74) Vangara, Hyderabad State, India (present-day Telangana)
- Party: Bharat Rashtra Samithi
- Spouse: Late Sri S. Dayakar Rao
- Children: 3
- Parents: P. V. Narasimha Rao (father); Smt. Sattamma (mother)
- Relatives: P. V. Rajeshwar Rao (brother)
- Education: B.A. (Osmania University); Diploma in Fine Arts (JNTUH)
- Occupation: Politician; academic; artist

Surabhi Vani Devi (born 1 April 1952) is an Indian politician, academic and artist. She is the daughter of P. V. Narasimha Rao, former Prime Minister of India. She was elected as MLC in Telangana Legislative Council election from Mahbubnagar–Ranga Reddy–Hyderabad Graduates constituency in March 2021.

== Early life ==
Vani Devi was born to former Prime Minister of India, P. V. Narasimha Rao on 1 April 1952 in Vangara village of then Karimnagar district in Telangana, India. She did her schooling from HSC from Govt. Girls High School, Hyderguda, B.A. from Osmania University and Diploma in Fine Arts from JNTU. She served as a lecturer in JNTU between 1990 and 1995.

== Academic activities ==
Vani Devi is an artist, educationist, social activist past 35 years, founder-principal of the Sri Venkateshwara Group of Institutions. She established Surabhi Educational Society, Sri Venkateshwara College of Fine Arts In the year 1991.

== As an artist ==
She is an artist, her favorite subject is Nature and medium is Water Colors and Acrylics. She has held more than 15 solo exhibitions, several group shows, seminars, talks in India and abroad since 1973.

== Awards ==
1. Awarded International Women’s Achievement Award by Telangana State Government in 2016.
2. Awarded Pratibha Puraskar award by Potti Sreeramulu Telugu University.
