= Dharmapuri Arvind =

Indian cricketer and politician (born 1976)

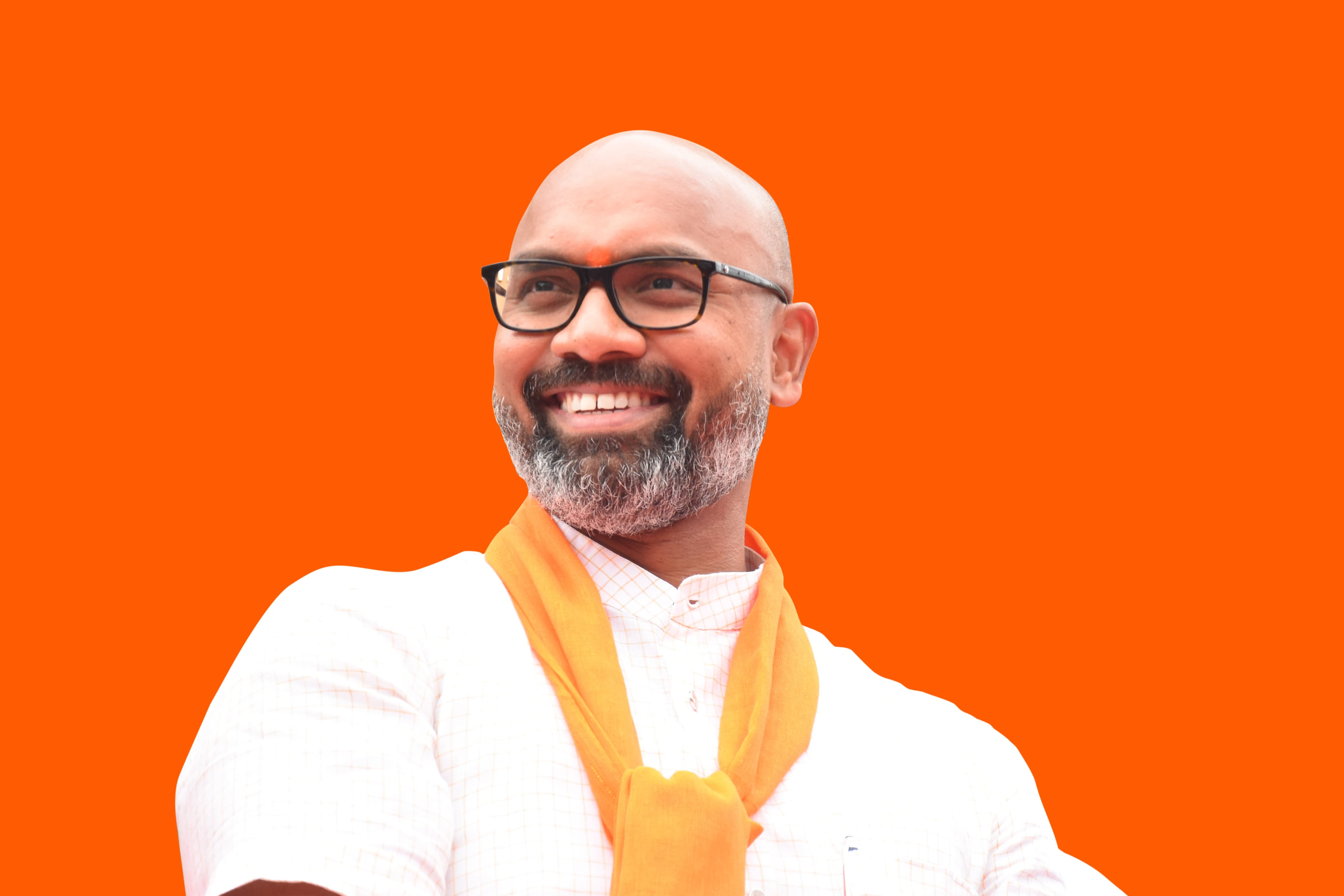

Member of Parliament, Lok Sabha
- Incumbent
- Assumed office 23 May 2019
- Preceded by: K. Kavitha
- Constituency: Nizamabad

Personal details
- Born: 25 August 1976 (age 50) Korutla, Nizamabad district, Andhra Pradesh (now Jagtial district, Telangana), India
- Party: Bharatiya Janata Party (BJP)
- Spouse: Priyanka Dharmapuri
- Children: Two sons
- Occupation: Politician
- Website: Official website
- Cricket career

Cricket information
- Batting: Right-handed
- Role: Batsman

Domestic team information
- Years: Team
- 1995–1996: Hyderabad (India)
- Source: ESPNcricinfo, 16 April 2016

Dharmapuri Arvind (born 25 August 1976) is an Indian politician, philanthropist, and former Ranji Trophy cricketer. He is currently serving as the member of parliament in the Lok Sabha from Nizamabad, Telangana. He is the younger of two sons of D. Srinivas who served as a Cabinet Minister under 4 Chief Ministers in United Andhra Pradesh.

== Early life and education ==
Arvind Dharmapuri was born on 25 August 1976 at Korutla into a prominent political family in Telangana. His grandfather, Dharmapuri Venkatram, was a Jan Sangh district vice-president. His father, D. Srinivas, was a four-time legislator, a former Andhra Pradesh Congress Committee President, and a Rajya Sabha Member. Arvind hails from the Munnuru Kapu community, categorized as Other Backward Class (OBC) in Telangana. Arvind completed his Master’s in Political Science from Janardan Rai Nagar Rajasthan Vidyapeeth.

== Career ==
=== Cricket ===
Arvind represented Hyderabad in the Ranji Trophy Ranji Trophy, and participated in Under-19, Under-21, Under-23, and Under-25 tournaments. He played the Moin-ud-Dowlah Gold Cup Tournament and represented South India Under-19 as an Opening Batsman.

=== Political ===
Arvind began his political career by joining the BJP in September 2017 and in 2019 contested as a BJP candidate from Nizamabad in the Lok Sabha elections.
He defeated former TRS MP K. Kavitha, the daughter of Telangana Chief Minister, K. Chandrashekar Rao while defeating world record 184 candidates from Nizamabad Lok Sabha Constituency. He was re-elected in 2024, defeating Congress veteran and former State Minister T. Jeevan Reddy, who is also a seven-time legislator. In 2022, Arvind was included in the core committee of BJP Videsh Vibhag.

Arvind played a crucial role in establishing the National Turmeric Board, fulfilling a 40-year-old demand of Telangana’s farmers. In October 2023, Prime Minister Narendra Modi announced the formation of the Board.

Before the National Turmeric Board was formed, he also contributed to the establishment of a Regional Centre of the Spices Board in 2020.

== Philanthropy ==
In 2013, Arvind founded the Arvind Dharmapuri Foundation (ADF) to support critically ill children from underprivileged families. The foundation has saved the lives of over 170 children under 12 years of age. Additionally, the ADF operates a Welfare Fund for BJP Booth Level Committee Members in Nizamabad.

== Personal life ==
Arvind comes from a family with a notable political legacy. He currently resides in Hyderabad with his mother, wife Priyanka, and two sons, Samanyu and Rudraksh.

== Key positions held ==
No	Position Held
1	Member of Parliament in the Lok Sabha from Nizamabad, Telangana
2	Member, Committee on Industry
3	Member, the Joint Committee on Offices of Profit
4	Consultative Committee for the Ministry of Road Transport & Highways

== See also ==
- List of Hyderabad cricketers
