= Goshamahal Assembly constituency =

Constituency of the Telangana legislative assembly in India

Coordinates: 17.379°N 78.468°E

Goshamahal
- Constituency No. 65 for the Telangana Legislative Assembly
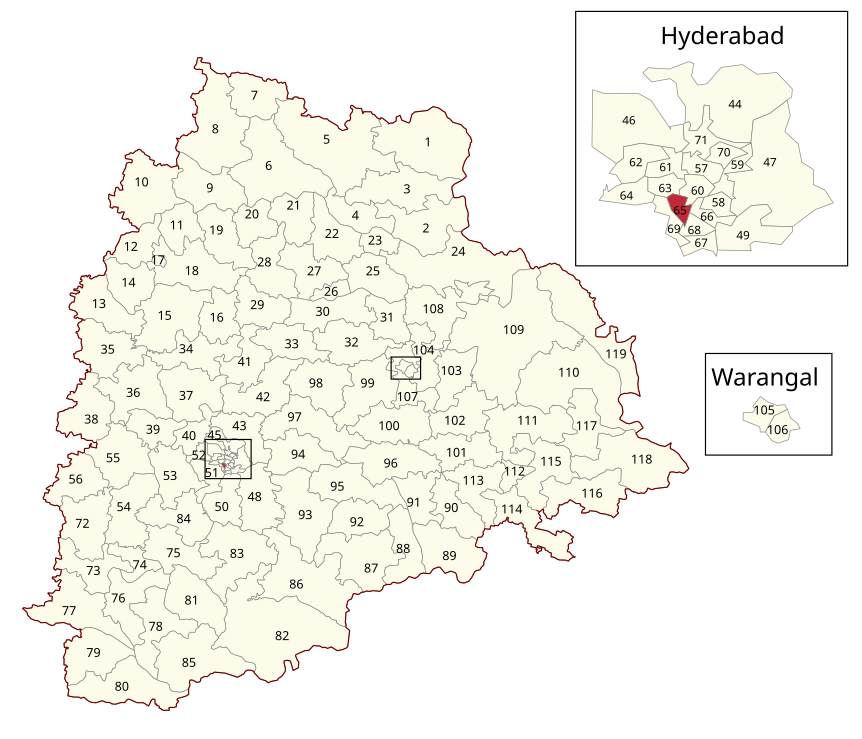
- Location of Goshamahal Assembly constituency within Telangana

Constituency details
- Country: India
- Region: South India
- State: Telangana
- District: Hyderabad
- Lok Sabha constituency: Hyderabad
- Established: 2008
- Total electors: 2,86,264
- Reservation: None

Member of Legislative Assembly
- 3rd Telangana Legislative Assembly
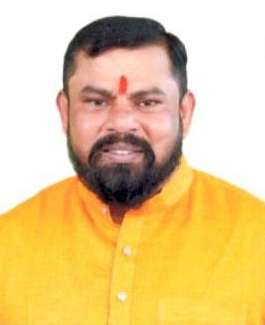
- Incumbent T. Raja Singh
- Party: BJP
- Elected year: 2023

Goshamahal Assembly constituency is a constituency of Telangana Legislative Assembly, India. It is one of the 26 constituencies of CURE limits, a strategic zone created by Government of Telangana. It is part of Hyderabad Lok Sabha constituency. Goshamahal has a sizeable Hindu migrant population, drawn from north India.

T. Raja Singh from Bharatiya Janata Party is representing the constituency. He was elected for the first time in 2014 and re-elected for second term in 2018 and got elected for a historic consecutive third term in 2023. The constituency before 2008 was Maharaj Ganj and its legislator was Prem Singh Rathore from BJP. T Raja Singh resigned from the Telangana BJP, citing his protest against the appointment of N Ramchander Rao

== Extent of the constituency ==
The constituency was created before the 2009 elections as per Delimitation Act of 2002.

The Assembly Constituency presently comprises the following neighbourhoods:

Neighbourhood
Goshamahal
Afzal Gunj
Aghapura
Boggulkunta
Dhoolpet
Koti (part)
Sultan Bazar
Moazzam Jahi Market
Nampally Station Road
Basheerbagh (part)

== Members of Legislative Assembly ==
Year	Member	Party
Andhra Pradesh
2009	Mukesh Goud	Indian National Congress
Telangana Legislative Assembly
2014	T. Raja Singh	Bharatiya Janata Party
2018	T. Raja Singh	Bharatiya Janata Party
2023	T. Raja Singh	Bharatiya Janata Party

== Election results ==
=== 2023 ===
2023 Telangana Legislative Assembly election: Goshamahal
Party	Candidate	Votes	%	±%
BJP	T. Raja Singh	80,182	54.08	+8.90
BRS	Nand Kishore Vyas	58,725	39.61	+7.38
INC	Mogili Sunitha	6,265	4.23	−15.00
NOTA	None of the Above	626	0.04	
Majority		21,457	14.47	
Turnout		1,48,259		
BJP hold		Swing		

=== 2018 ===
2018 Telangana Legislative Assembly election: Goshamahal
Party	Candidate	Votes	%	±%
BJP	T. Raja Singh	61,854	45.18	−13.5
TRS	Prem Singh Rathore	44,120	32.23	+14.4
INC	M. Mukesh Goud	26,322	19.23	−9.9
NOTA	None of the Above	709	0.52	
Majority		17,734	13.0	−16.52
Turnout		1,36,911	58.72	
BJP hold		Swing		

=== 2014 ===
Telangana Legislative Assembly Election, 2014: Goshamahal
Party	Candidate	Votes	%	±%
BJP	T. Raja Singh	92,757	58.9	+12.72
INC	M. Mukesh Goud	45,964	29.2	−16.49
IND.	Nand Kishore Vyas	7,123	4.49	New
TRS	Prem Kumar Dhoot	6,312	3.98	New
Majority		46,793	29.52	+12.83
Turnout		1,58,528	55.37	−3.93
BJP gain from INC		Swing	+13.03	

=== 2009 ===
Andhra Pradesh Legislative Assembly Election, 2009: Goshamahal
Party	Candidate	Votes	%	±%
INC	M. Mukesh Goud	55,829	45.48	
BJP	Prem Singh Rathore	35,341	28.78	
TDP	G. S. Bugga Rao	19,882	16.20	
PRP	G. Madhavi Deepak	5,442	4.43	
LSP	Hemanth Kumar Jaiswal	2,088	1.70	
Majority		20,488	16.69	
Turnout		1,22,759	59.30	
INC win (new seat)				

== Trivia ==
- Goshamahal is the only assembly seat in Hyderabad assembly constituency which has never been won by AIMIM.

== See also ==
- List of constituencies of Telangana Legislative Assembly
