= Mukesh Goud =

Indian politician (1959–2019)

Mula Mukesh Goud
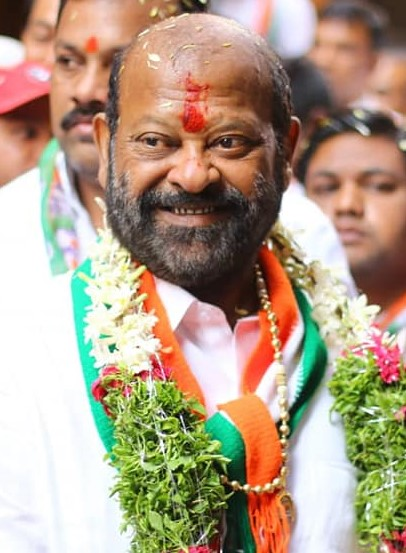
- Mukesh Goud

Minister for Marketing & Warehousing, Govt of Andhra Pradesh
- In office 25 November 2010 – 1 March 2014
- Preceded by: Raja Singh
- Constituency: Goshamahal

Personal details
- Born: 1 July 1959
- Died: 29 July 2019 (aged 60); Hyderabad, Telangana, India
- Political party: Indian National Congress
- Spouse: Smt. Laxmi
- Children: Shilpa Goud, Vikram Goud, Vishal Goud
- Parent: M. Narsimha Goud (father)
- Relatives: Tulla Devender Goud (maternal uncle)
- Website: www.mukeshgoud.org

Mula Mukesh Goud (1 July 1959 – 29 July 2019) was an Indian politician and 3 time MLA (Member of Legislative Assembly) in Andhra Pradesh Andhra Pradesh Legislative Assembly. He served as a Minister for Backward classes welfare (2007) and Minister for marketing and warehousing (2009) in the undivided Andhra Pradesh.

== Positions held ==
#	From	To	Position	Party
1.	2004	2009	MLA (2nd term, his first term was in the 1980’s) from Maharajgunj.: Minister for Backward classes welfare (2007)	INC
2.	2009	2014	MLA (3rd term) from Goshamahal.: Minister for marketing and warehousing (2009)	INC

== Death ==
He died at the age of 60 at a private hospital in Hyderabad on 29 July 2019. He was suffering from throat cancer for the last two years and was in hospitals for treatment many times.
