= K. Kavitha =

Indian politician (born 1978)

Kalvakuntla Kavitha
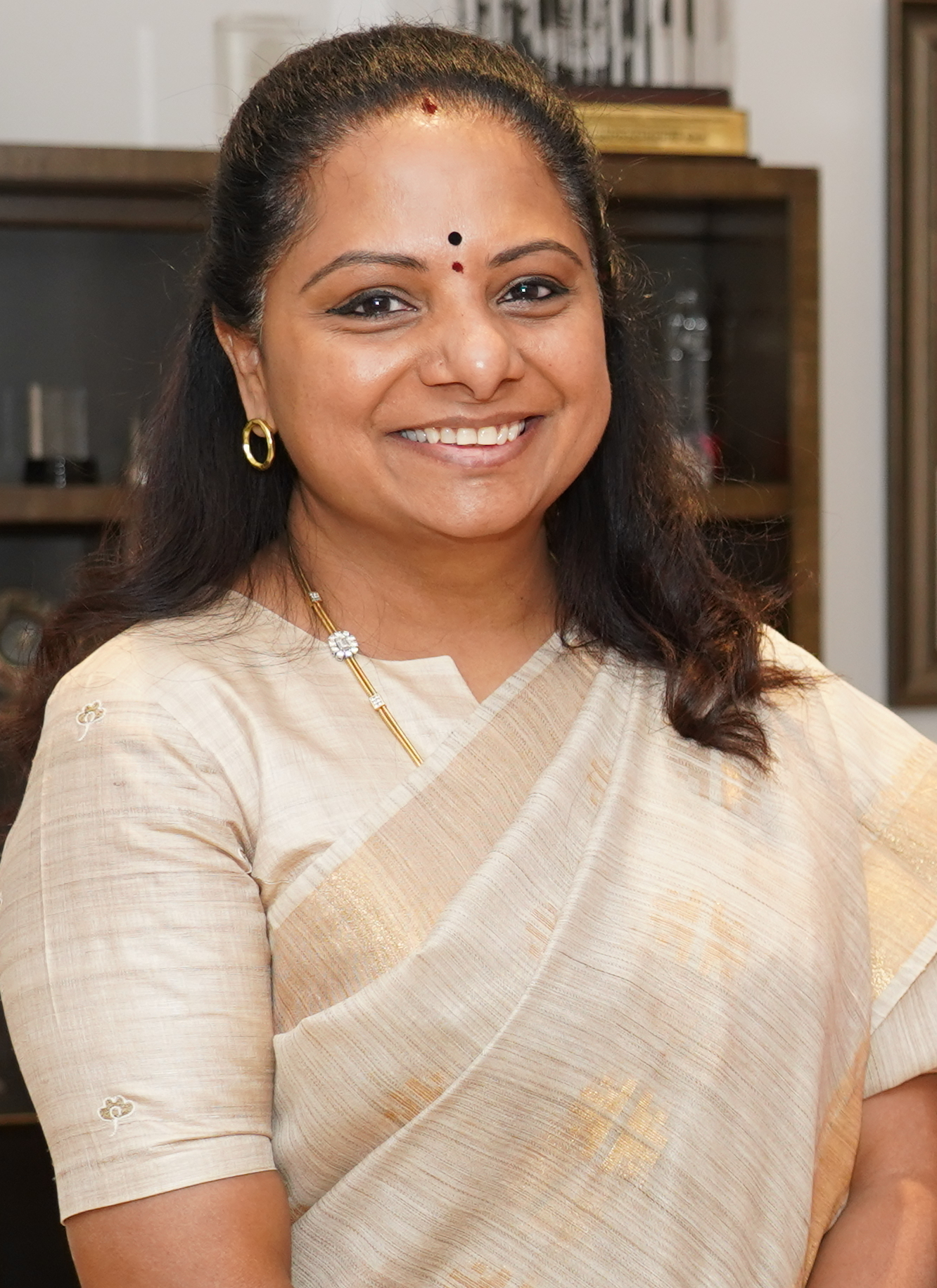
- Kavitha in 2025

Member of the Telangana Legislative Council
- In office 12 October 2020 – 6 January 2026
- Preceded by: R. Bhupathi Reddy
- Constituency: Nizamabad Local Authorities

Member of Parliament, Lok Sabha
- In office 16 May 2014 – 23 May 2019
- Preceded by: Madhu Yashki
- Succeeded by: Dharmapuri Arvind
- Constituency: Nizamabad

Personal details
- Born: 13 March 1978 (age 48) Karimnagar, Andhra Pradesh (present-day Telangana), India
- Party: Telangana Rakshana Sena (since 2026)
- Other political affiliations: Bharat Rashtra Samithi (until 2025)
- Spouse: Devanapalli Ramayagari Anil Kumar (m. 2003)
- Children: 2
- Parents: K. Chandrashekar Rao (father); K. Shobha (mother)
- Relatives: K. T. Rama Rao (brother); T. Harish Rao (cousin); Joginapally Santosh Kumar (cousin)

Kalvakuntla Kavitha (born 13 March 1978) is an Indian politician who served as a Member of the Legislative Council (MLC) from Nizamabad. Earlier she served as a Member of Parliament from Nizamabad Lok Sabha Constituency from 2014 to 2019. She is the daughter of former chief minister of Telangana, K. Chandrasekhar Rao.

Earlier she was a member of Bharat Rashtra Samithi party, she was suspended from BRS on 2 September 2025 for ‘anti-party activities’.

== Early life and education ==
Kavitha was born in Karimnagar, Telangana, to K. Chandrashekhar Rao and Shobha. Her father was a prominent leader of the Telangana movement and was the first Chief Minister of Telangana.

Kavitha was educated at Stanley Girls' High School in Hyderabad. She completed her B.Tech. from VNR Vignana Jyothi Institute of Engineering and Technology, Hyderabad. She then earned a master’s degree in Computer science from the University of Southern Mississippi, United States.

Kavitha is married to Devanapalli Anil Kumar, a businessman. They have two sons, Aaditya and Aarya.

== Career ==
Kalvakuntla Kavitha began her career as an IT professional in the United States, where she worked in the technology sector after completing her master's degree in computer science. Later she returned India to be part of the Telangana movement.

In 2006, Kavitha founded Telangana Jagruthi, a cultural and social organization dedicated to promoting Telangana’s identity, tradition, and native language. Through this platform, she organized cultural programs, literary events, and awareness campaigns.

In 2008, Kavitha worked with historians and archaeologists on initiatives to preserve Telangana's historical heritage, including the efforts for conservation and excavation of the Koti Lingala Temple, a sacred site spanning over 40 acres, believed to be one of the earliest Shiva temples in the region—bearing more than a thousand years of historical significance.

In 2010, Kavitha visited the Chenchu tribe, an indigenous community residing deep within the Nallamala Forest and opposed deforestation and mining activities in this ecologically sensitive region, advocating for the protection of tribal livelihoods and the preservation of nature.

After her marriage, in 2003, Kavitha moved to the US with her husband and returned to India in 2006. In 2014, the new state of Telangana was carved out of Andhra Pradesh and Kavitha's father was the leader of the movement for statehood. She took part of the movement. In the election of May 2014, her father's party swept the Telangana seats both for the state assembly and the national parliament and her father became the first chief minister of Telangana. She lost Lok Sabha election 2019 from Nizamabad to a BJP candidate Dharmapuri Arvind.

=== Telangana Jagruthi ===
Drawing Inspiration from the ongoing people's movement for the statehood of Telangana and a strong desire to work for the welfare of the people, led Kavitha to the formation of Telangana Jagruthi in August 2006. However, the organization was formally registered in November 2007. The word Jagruthi means Awakening. Awakening the Telangana society to a renewed sense of pride & unity was the goal.

Telangana Jagruthi played a key role in mobilizing the support of women and youth and also large sections of the society which acted as a force multiplier in the peaceful and non violent struggle for Telangana Statehood.

K. Kavitha took an initiative to skill the youth of Telangana for making them ready for the gainful employment. Currently Telangana Jagruthi Skill Centers are imparting training to 8500 students across Telangana and assist them in placements.

=== Labour and trade unions ===
Kavitha is actively involved in labour and trade unions. Currently she serves in the following Labour and Trade Unions.

1. Honorary President - Telangana Rashtra Vidyut Karmika Sangham - TRVKS - Electricity Employees Union.
2. Honorary President - Telangana Anganwadi Workers and Helpers Association - TAWHA - An organization of Anganwadi workers.

=== Bharat Scouts and Guides ===
K Kavitha has been elected the first state chief commissioner of Telangana chapter of Bharat Scouts and Guides (BS & G) Association. She formally took charge at the investiture ceremony held at the BSG state headquarters at Domalguda.

=== Hindu Mazdoor Sabha ===
Kavitha was elected as honorary president of Hindusthan Mazdoor Sabha - HMS (The Singareni Miners and Engineering Workers’ Union) in 2025.

== Political career ==
After the formation of Telangana state in 2014, Kavitha contested general elections from Nizamabad Lok Sabha constituency and won with over 164,184 vote majority. She took active leadership in the protests and demonstrations that were organized in support of the statehood movement all across Telangana.

As an MP, in Parliament and public life, Kavitha supported the cause of Telangana as well as other national issues. Kavitha once again contested as an MP in the 2019 Indian general election from Nizamabad. She lost to Dharmapuri Arvind with a margin of 70,875 votes.

Kavitha is elected as Member of Legislative Council from Nizamabad Local Authorities' Constituency in October 2020 in the bypoll, which was held after the disqualification of the then sitting member R. Bhoopati Reddy. Kavitha had secured 728 votes out of the total 823. Kavitha was elected unopposed from Nizamabad Local Authorities constituency in the biennial polls to the Telangana Legislative Council held in December 2021 for the second time. She took oath as MLC on 19 January 2022.

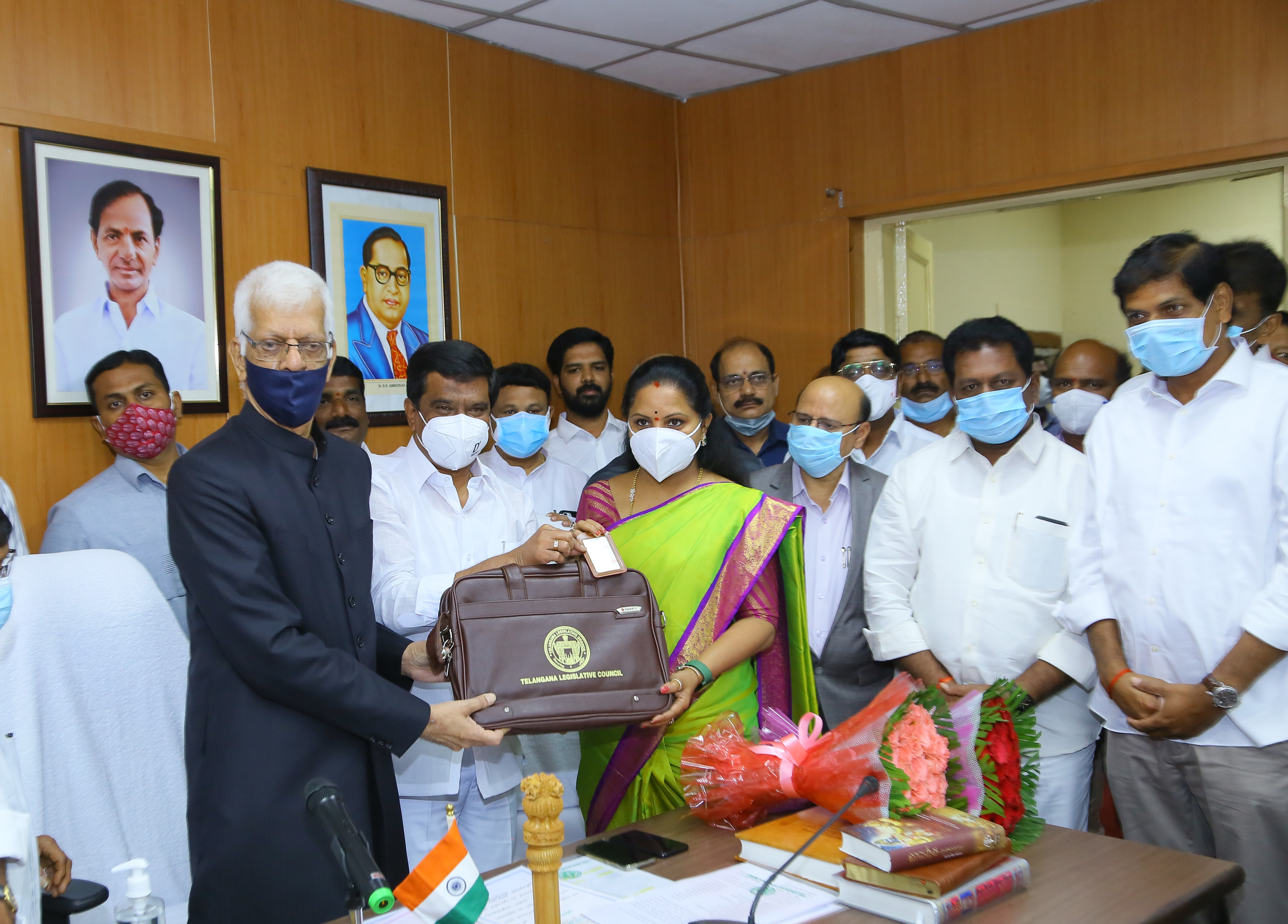
Kalvakuntla Kavitha takes oath as MLC

=== Parliamentary Committee ===
In the Parliament, Kavitha is a member of the Estimates Committee, the Standing Committee on Commerce and also on the Consultative Committee, Ministry of Rural Development, Panchayati Raj and Drinking water and Sanitation.

=== Commonwealth Parliamentary Association ===
Recently, Kavitha has been nominated to the steering committee of Commonwealth Women Parliamentarians (CWP) India Region. Commonwealth Women Parliamentarians works for increasing the women representatives in Parliaments.

=== Parliamentary delegation ===
Kavitha has traveled to many countries and officially she was a part of the Vice President's Delegation to Cambodia and Laos as well as with Lok Sabha Speaker's delegation to the European Parliament to Brussels, Belgium.

=== Rift with party ===
In May 2025, a private letter to K. Chandrasekhar Rao in which Kavitha alleged conspiracies in the party against him was leaked to press after which there were differences between her and the party members including with her brother K. T. Rama Rao. She later denied these and called them "rumors". In July 2025 she was allegedly sidelined by K.T Rama Rao in the appointment of the party's in-charge for a Coal Miner's union.

Reports of differences were continuously denied by both her and her party members.

In September, after the Ghose report on irregularities in Kaleeshwaram irrigation project was made public and the subsequent direction of the state government to launch of investigation into it by the CBI, she lashed out on Harish Rao, her cousin and the then irrigation minister of the state. On 2 September 2025, the disciplinary committee of the party suspended her for anti-party activities in a letter signed by KCR. After her suspension, she resigned from the party membership and also tendered her resignation as an MLC on 3 September 2025 Hon’ble Chairman Gutha Sukender Reddy accepted the resignation on 6 January 2026.

== Jagruthi Janam Bata ==
Kalvakuntla Kavitha has initiated a programme to travel across the telangana from 25 October 2025 to 13 February 2026 by interacting with intellectuals, educationalists, and caste organizations to discuss the way forward for her movements towards a 'Social Telangana'.

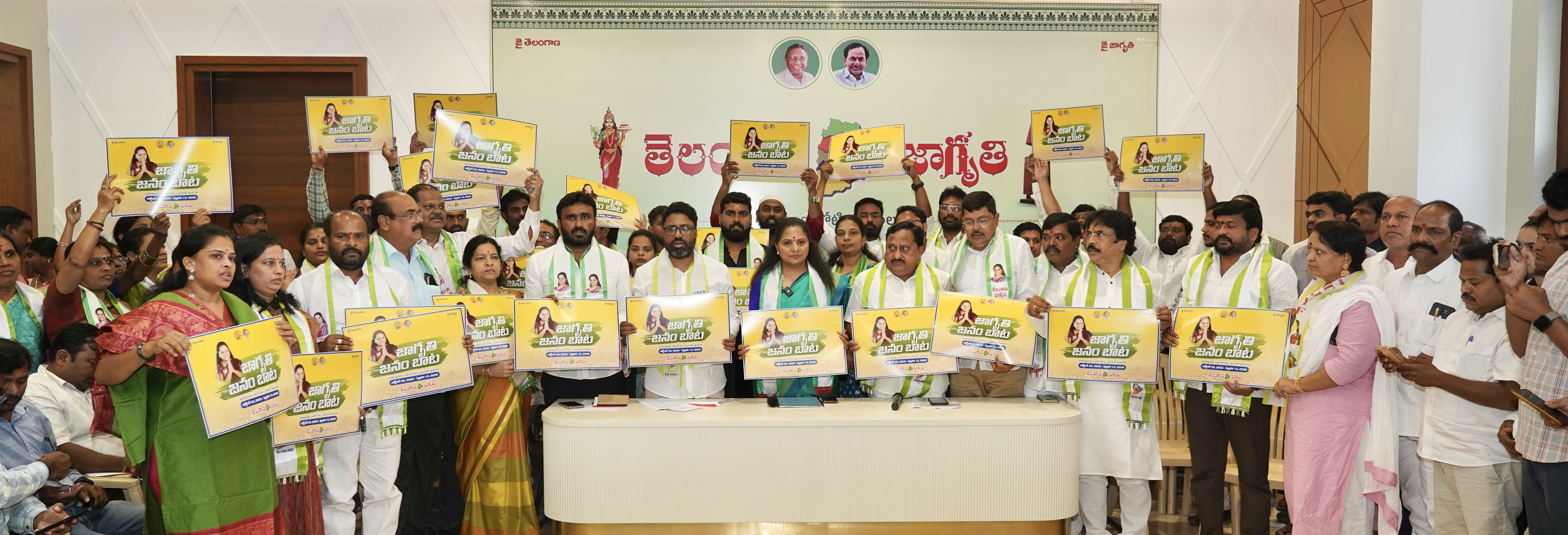
Kalvakuntla Kavitha unveiled the poster of the Jagruthi – Janam Bata programme, in the presence of Jagruthi leaders, supporters, and cadre

== Suspension from Bharat Rashtra Samithi ==
On September 2, 2025, K. Kavitha was suspended from the Bharat Rashtra Samithi (BRS) by party president K. Chandrashekar Rao, her father and the former chief minister of Telangana. The suspension followed her public allegations against senior BRS leader and cousin T. Harish Rao, whom she blamed for the federal investigation targeting KCR. In an official statement, party leaders cited her recent comments and activities as "anti-party" and damaging to the BRS.

== Key initiatives ==
Women’s Reservation Bill: Kavitha held a round table conference in New Delhi at Hotel Le Meridian on 15 March 2025 demanding instant introduction of the Women's Reservation Bill in the current session of Parliament. Earlier she protested a day-long hunger strike at Jantar Mantar on 10 March 2025.

Round Table Conferences: Kavitha held over 20 major round table conferences across the state, engaging with all BC groups to explain the importance and benefits of reservation. These meetings also aimed to mobilize support and pressurize both the state and central governments.

72-Hour Hunger Strike: Kavitha launched a 72-hour hunger strike demanding the 42% BC reservation on 4 August 2025 at Dharna Chowk. She called off her proposed 72-hour hunger strike that began at 10 am morning as the police denied permission for her protest after 4 pm. Indian National Lok Dal leader Arjun Singh Chautala attended the dharna and extended his support to Kavitha.

Political Engagement: Kavitha met with Union Minister of State for Social Justice and Empowerment Ramdas Athawale, along with numerous local and national party representatives, urging them to expedite the bills passed by the Telangana Assembly concerning BC reservations. She requested the Union Minister to support the cause and push for early approval.

Rail Roko Protest: In June–July 2025, Kalvakuntla Kavitha has announced a state-wide Rail Roko protest on July 17, demanding the Central government to approve the bills passed by Telangana Assembly for providing 42 per cent reservations to Backward Classes (BCs) in local bodies, education and employment.

== Controversies ==
=== Delhi liquor policy scam ===
In 2023, Kavitha has been accused of being involved in the Delhi liquor scam. She has been questioned and investigated by Enforcement Directorate (ED) regarding her role in the scam. She was arrested by the ED on 15 March 2024 in connection with the liquor scam.

On 26 March 2024, Kavitha was sent to judicial custody for 15 days in Tihar Jail.

On 11 April 2024, she was again arrested by the CBI in Tihar Jail and was released on bail on 27 August 2024.

On February 26, 2026, a Delhi court discharged Kavitha, along with Sisodia, Kejriwal and others, in this case, noting the accusations were not supported by sufficient material. While pronouncing the verdict, the Court said that the CBI chargesheet running into thousands of pages included material which did not support any of the witness statements. The Court said there were “misleading averments” in the chargesheet.

CBI stated that crucial aspects of the case have not been considered by the court and moved to Delhi High Court challenging the discharge of Kejriwal, Sisodia and others. CBI has claimed that the excise policy was "manipulated" to facilitate some traders and the CBI was able to trace the money laundering. However, the trial court proceeded to discharge the accused without considering the collaborative material on record. It has claimed that this is a clear case of corruption, with meticulous evidence being collected by CBI. The Delhi High Court has issued notice on this plea. The High Court has also stayed the observations made by the trial court against CBI.

== Elections contested ==
=== Lok Sabha ===
| Year | Constituency | Party | Votes | % | Opponent | Opponent Party | Opponent Votes | % | Result | Margin | % |
|---|---|---|---|---|---|---|---|---|---|---|---|
| 2019 | Nizamabad | TRS | 409,709 | 38.55 | Dharmapuri Arvind | BJP | 480,584 | 45.22 | Lost | -70,875 | -6.67 |
| 2014 | Nizamabad | TRS | 439,307 | 42.49 | Madhu Yaskhi Goud | INC | 272,123 | 26.23 | Won | 167,184 | 16.17 |

=== Telangana Member of Legislative Council ===
- Member of Legislative Council, Nizamabad Local Authorities' Constituency (First term) - 2020-21
- Member of Legislative Council, Nizamabad Local Authorities' Constituency (Second term) - 2021–25
