= Endapalli =

Endapalli may refer to places in India:

- Endapalli, Karimnagar district, Telangana.
- Endapalli, Krishna district, Andhra Pradesh.
- Endapalli, West Godavari district, Andhra Pradesh.
- Endapalli, Kadapa district, Andhra Pradesh.
