= Venkateshwara Temple, Allipur =

Hindu temple in Allipur, Jagtial, Telangana, IN

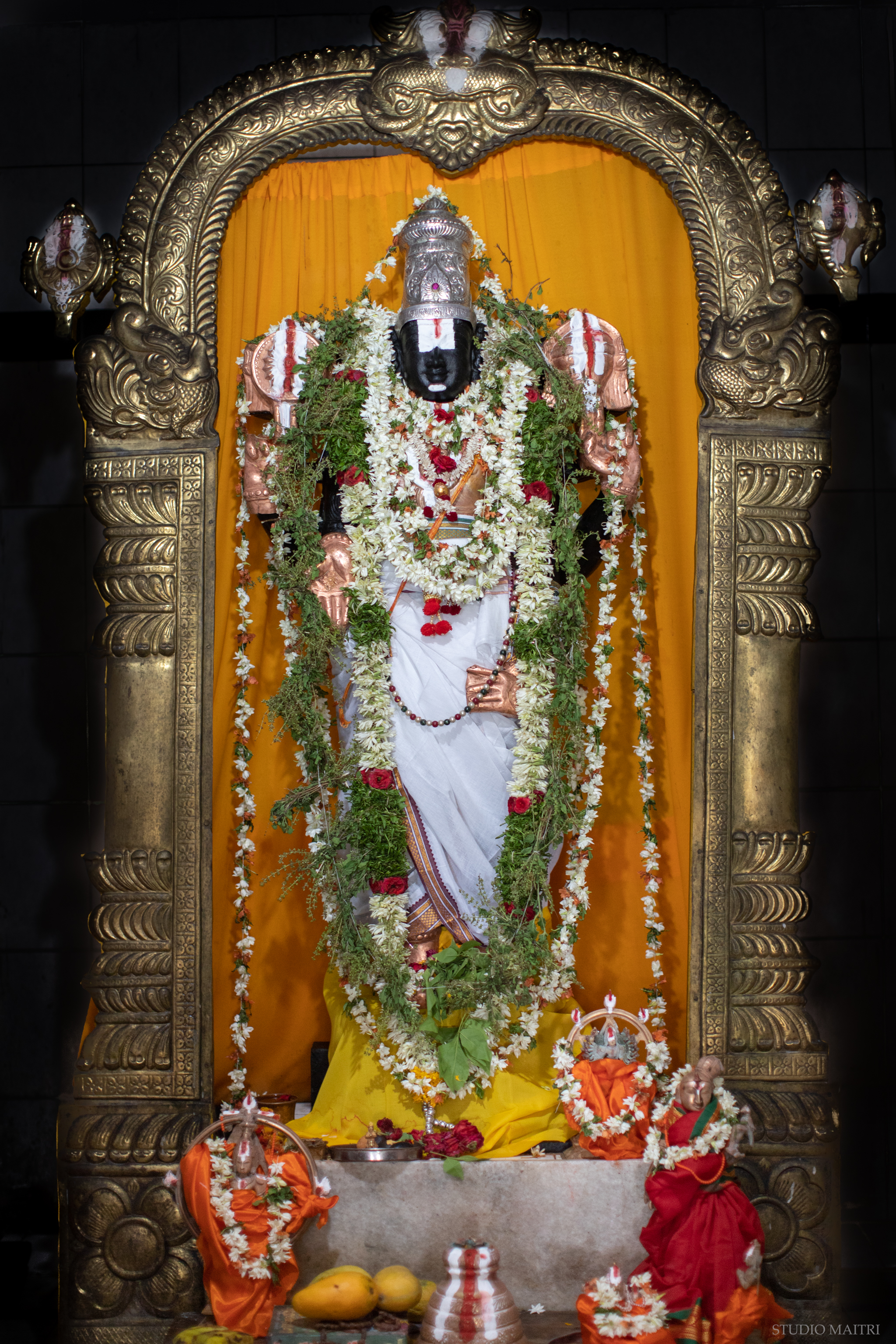
- Idol of Venkateshwara Swamy

- Location in Telangana

Religion
- Affiliation: Hinduism
- District: Raikal
- Deity: Venkateshwara Swamy

Location
- Location: Allipur
- State: Telangana
- Country: India
- Interactive map of Venkateshwara Temple, Allipur
- Coordinates: 18°51′18.8″N 78°52′14.51″E

Architecture
- Type: Dravidian
- Founder: Dr. Balay Ishweriah
- Completed: 2001

Website
- www.svtempleallipur.org

Sri Venkateshwara Swamy Temple is located at the village of Allipur, Raikal mandal in Jagtial district of Telangana, India. The temple is dedicated to promoting the Hindu religion and serving the community of Allipur and surrounding villages in the region.

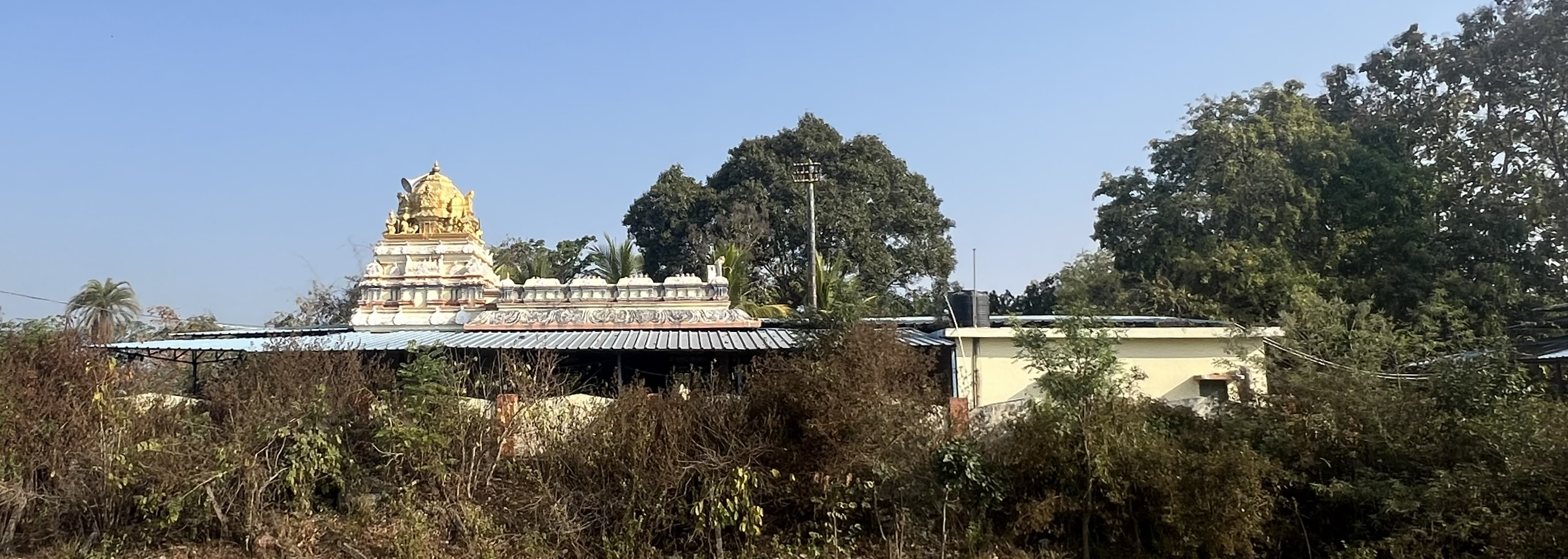
Venkateshwara Temple at Allipur

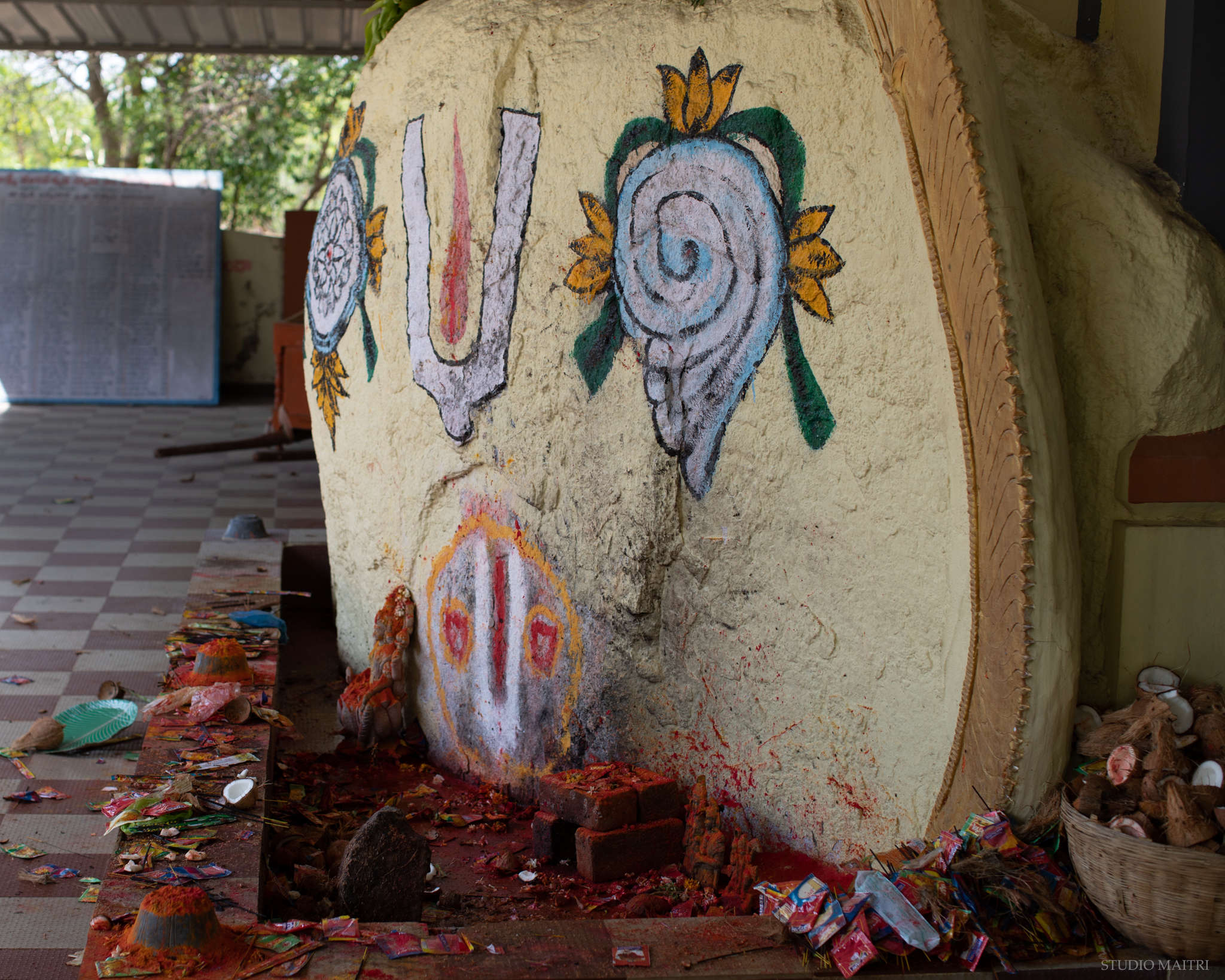
Sacred rock worshipped at Venkateshwara temple, Allipur

== History of the temple and region ==
The history of the temple and the region was well captured in a letter written by Jaisetty Ramanaiah, an eminent historian from this region who had also published books on the architecture and temples of the region. Below historical details are observations in the letter.

=== Legend ===
The local legend is that Lord Sri Rama had a sojourn here when he was passing through Dandakaranya. in Threthayuga. The presence of nearby village named Ayodhya, has been considered as a testimonial for it

=== Medieval history ===
Allipur and its vicinity has historical significance for the past thousand years. A Chalukyan Trikuta Temple at Raikal, built during the 11th century is located only 10 km from Allipur. The Dubba Rajeshwara Swamy temple at Konapur is located 6 km to the east and very near to it is Pulastheswara temple at Polasa, where an inscription on a stone pillar was perched by King Medha Raja the first in1108 AD. The worship of Lord Shiva and Lord Vishnu was prevalent in the region including at Allipur.

A deity of Vaishnava cult was noticed on a big rock lying on a mound in a field adjacent to the cart-track leading from Allipur to Jagtial. A large number of people including the local villagers have been worshipping this Vishnu deity performing several rituals. The sthala purana states that the sacred rock with the deity was surrounded by a forest and that the saints and sages worshipped this deity; their puranic stories are still revealed by the local villagers. The present day temple was built to provide shelter to this sacred shrine.

=== Consecration ===
The Prana Prathista of the temple was held on May 14, 2001. The vigrahams of Venkateshwa Swamy, Padmavati and Andal were acquired from Tirumala Tirupathi Devasthanams (TTD). The stone idol of main deity is over 4 ft tall.

A decade later (in 2012), two more shrines were added to the premises, dedicated to Laxmi Ganapati and Abaya Anjaneya Swamy.

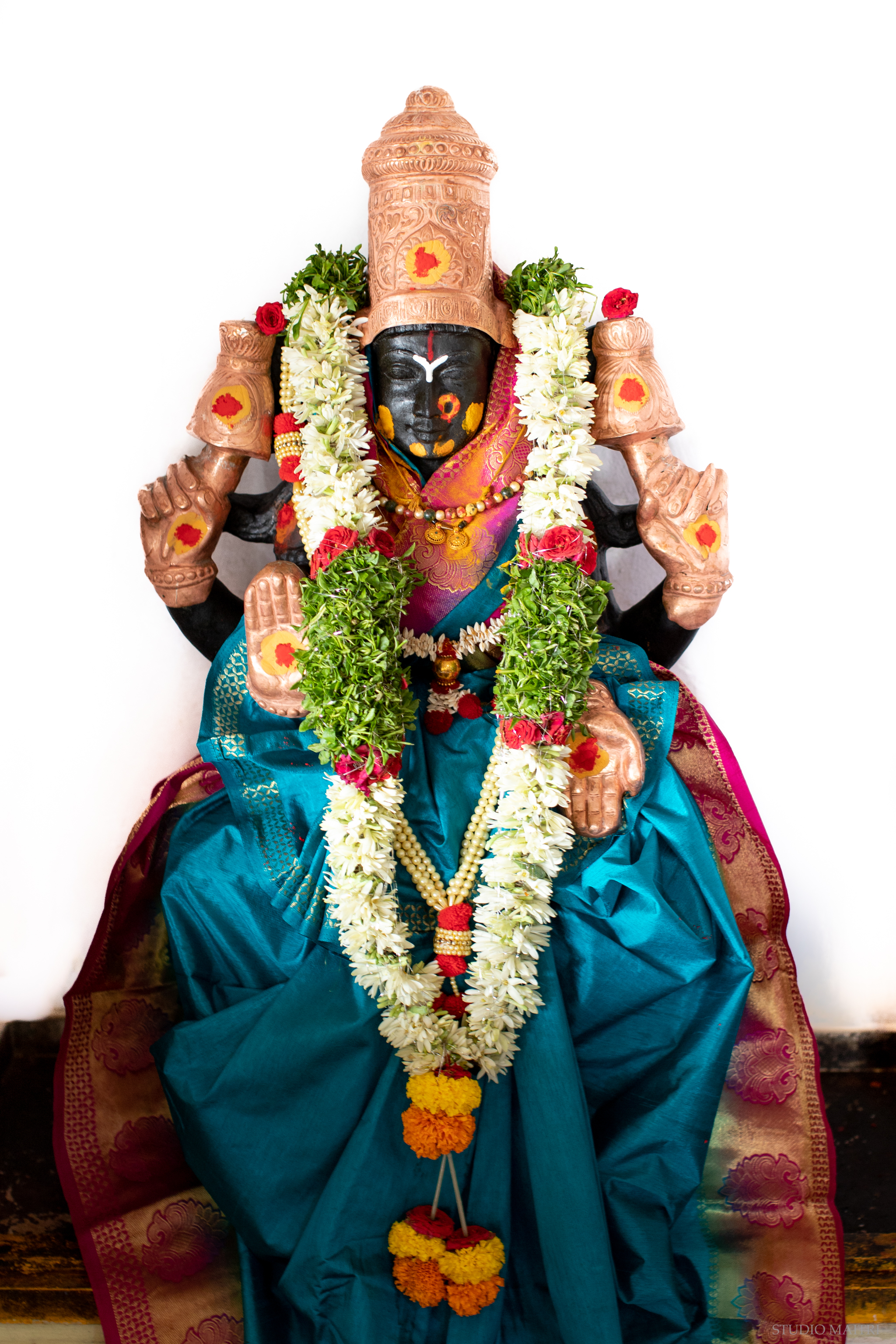
Idol of Padmavati

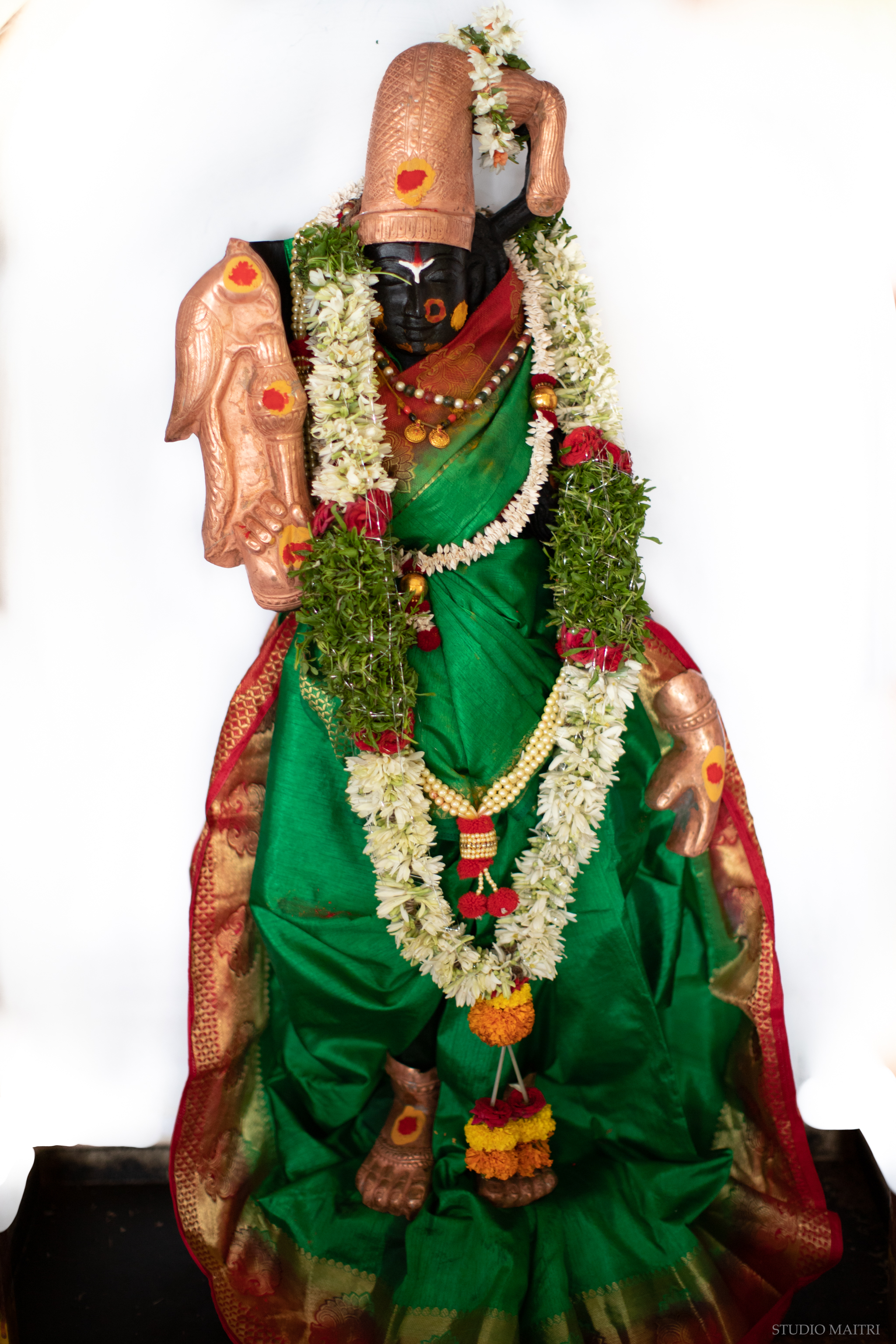
Idol of Andal

== See also ==
- Temple of Telangana
