= Dharmapuri, Telangana Assembly constituency =

Constituency of the Telangana legislative assembly in India

Coordinates: 18.95°N 79.09°E

Dharmapuri SC
- Constituency No. 22 for the Telangana Legislative Assembly
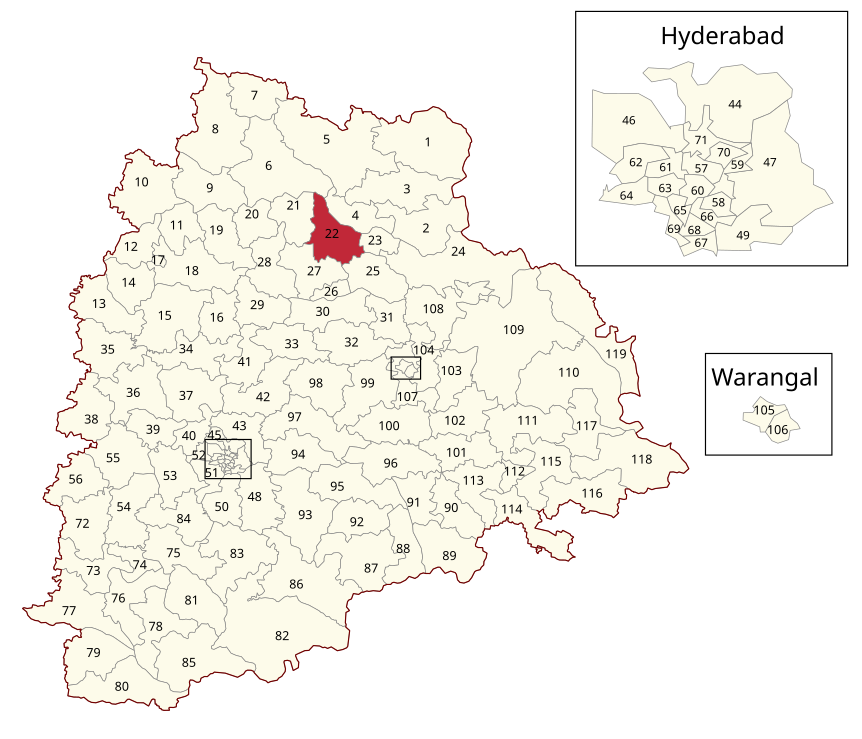
- Location of Dharmapuri Assembly constituency within Telangana

Constituency details
- Country: India
- Region: South India
- State: Telangana
- District: Jagitial
- Lok Sabha constituency: Peddapalli
- Established: 2008
- Total electors: 1,87,266
- Reservation: SC

Member of Legislative Assembly
- 3rd Telangana Legislative Assembly
- Incumbent A. Laxman Kumar
- Party: Indian National Congress
- Elected year: 2023

Dharmapuri is a constituency of Telangana Legislative Assembly, India. It is one among 3 constituencies in Jagitial district and is a part of Peddapalli Lok Sabha constituency.

Koppula Eshwar of Telangana Rashtra Samithi has represented the constituency since its inception, from the 2009 election until 2023. In the 2023 Telangana Legislative Assembly election, Adluri Laxman Kumar won.

== Election results Buggaram 1957-2004 ==
=== Assembly Election 2004 ===
2004 Andhra Pradesh Legislative Assembly election : Buggaram
Party	Candidate	Votes	%	±%
INC	Juvvadi Ratnakar Rao	54,897	48.70%	
TDP	Shikari Vishwanath	45,109	40.02%	
Margin of victory		9,788	8.68%	
Turnout		112,720	71.50%	
Total valid votes		112,720		
INC gain from TDP		Swing		

=== Assembly Election 1999 ===
1999 Andhra Pradesh Legislative Assembly election : Buggaram
Party	Candidate	Votes	%	±%
INC	Juvvadi Ratnakar Rao	63,383	52.80%	
TDP	Amballa Bhagyavathi	48,003	39.99%	
Margin of victory		15,380	12.81%	
Turnout		120,040	68.20%	
Total valid votes		120,040		
INC gain from TDP		Swing		

=== Assembly Election 1994 ===
1994 Andhra Pradesh Legislative Assembly election : Buggaram
Party	Candidate	Votes	%	±%
TDP	Shikari Vishwanath	51,599	48.35%	
INC	Juvvadi Ratnakar Rao	47,474	44.48%	
Margin of victory		4,125	3.87%	
Turnout		106,720	70.10%	
Total valid votes		106,720		
TDP gain from Independent		Swing		

=== Assembly Election 1989 ===
1989 Andhra Pradesh Legislative Assembly election : Buggaram
Party	Candidate	Votes	%	±%
Independent	Juvvadi Ratnakar Rao	32,892	38.60%	
TDP	Gandra Venkateshwar Rao	24,299	28.51%	
Margin of victory		8,593	10.09%	
Turnout		85,210	62.40%	
Total valid votes		85,210		
Independent gain from TDP		Swing		

=== Assembly Election 1985 ===
1985 Andhra Pradesh Legislative Assembly election : Buggaram
Party	Candidate	Votes	%	±%
TDP	Shikari Vishwanath	55,736	74.20%	
INC	Kadakuntla Gangaram	15,844	21.09%	
Margin of victory		39,892	53.11%	
Turnout		75,120	63.80%	
Total valid votes		75,120		
TDP gain from INC		Swing		

=== Assembly Election 1983 ===
1983 Andhra Pradesh Legislative Assembly election : Buggaram
Party	Candidate	Votes	%	±%
INC	Kadakuntla Gangaram	19,515	31.20%	
Independent	Shikari Vishwanath	17,596	28.13%	
Margin of victory		1,919	3.07%	
Turnout		62,540	58.20%	
Total valid votes		62,540		
INC gain from INC(I)		Swing		

=== Assembly Election 1978 ===
1978 Andhra Pradesh Legislative Assembly election : Buggaram
Party	Candidate	Votes	%	±%
INC(I)	Amballa Rajaram	35,992	58.10%	
INC	Velichala Jagapathi Rao	18,686	30.16%	
Margin of victory		17,306	27.94%	
Turnout		61,950	64.30%	
Total valid votes		61,950		
INC(I) win		Swing	New	

=== Assembly Election 1972 ===
1972 Andhra Pradesh Legislative Assembly election : Buggaram
Party	Candidate	Votes	%	±%
Independent	Joginipalli Damodar Rao	19,995	56.10%	
INC	B. Ramulu	12,462	34.96%	
Margin of victory		7,533	21.14%	
Turnout		35,640	52.10%	
Total valid votes		35,640		
Independent win		Swing		

=== Assembly Election 1967 ===
1967 Andhra Pradesh Legislative Assembly election : Buggaram
Party	Candidate	Votes	%	±%
INC	Y. M. Reddy	24,975	78.20%	
Independent	Enugu Narayana Reddy	5,018	15.71%	
Margin of victory		19,957	62.49%	
Turnout		31,930	48.60%	
Total valid votes		31,930		
INC win		Swing		

=== Assembly Election 1962 ===
1962 Andhra Pradesh Legislative Assembly election : Buggaram
Party	Candidate	Votes	%	±%
Independent	Enugu Narayana Reddy	20,807	48.70%	
INC	A. Mohan Reddy	20,493	47.97%	
Margin of victory		314	0.73%	
Turnout		42,720	54.80%	
Total valid votes		42,720		
Independent win		Swing		

=== Assembly Election 1957 ===
1957 Andhra Pradesh Legislative Assembly election : Buggaram
Party	Candidate	Votes	%	±%
Independent	A. Mohan Reddy	12,265	49.30%	New
INC	Lakshminarasimha Rao	11,816	47.50%	New
Margin of victory		449	1.80%	New
Turnout		24,870	41.20%	New
Total valid votes		24,870		
Independent win		Swing	New	

== Mandals ==
The assembly constituency presently comprises the following mandals:

Mandal	Districts
Dharmapuri	Jagtial
Gollapally	Jagtial
Velgatoor	Jagtial
Pegadapally	Jagtial
Dharmaram	Peddapalli
Buggaram	Jagtial

== Members of Legislative Assembly ==
Election	Name	Party
Andhra Pradesh
2009	Koppula Eshwar	Telangana Rashtra Samithi
2010 by-election	Koppula Eshwar	Telangana Rashtra Samithi
Telangana
2014	Koppula Eshwar	Telangana Rashtra Samithi
2018	Koppula Eshwar	Telangana Rashtra Samithi
2023	Adluri Laxman Kumar	Indian National Congress

== Election results ==
=== Assembly Election 2023 ===
2023 Telangana Legislative Assembly election : Dharmapuri
Party	Candidate	Votes	%	±%
INC	Adluri Laxman Kumar	91,393	50.30%	▲7.98
BRS	Koppula Eshwar	69,354	38.17%	▼4.41
BJP	Sogala Kumar	7,345	4.04%	▲0.86
Independent	Sherla Mahendar	3,847	2.12%	New
Independent	Mothe Naresh	2,678	1.47%	▲1.29
NOTA	None of the above	2,392	1.32%	▼0.25
BSP	Nakka Vijay Kumar	1,344	0.74%	▲0.10
Margin of victory		22,039	12.13%	▲11.87
Turnout		181,698	79.28%	▼0.91
Total valid votes		181,698		
INC gain from BRS		Swing	▲6.20	

=== Assembly Election 2018 ===
2018 Telangana Legislative Assembly election : Dharmapuri
Party	Candidate	Votes	%	±%
BRS	Koppula Eshwar	70,579	42.58%	▼5.12
INC	Adluri Laxman Kumar	70,138	42.32%	▲7.32
Independent	Kuntala Narsaiah	13,114	7.91%	New
BJP	Kannam Anjaiah	5,272	3.18%	▲0.18
NOTA	None of the above	2,600	1.57%	▲0.51
Independent	Buradagunta Sangha Mithra	1,259	0.76%	New
BSP	Thadagonda Nagaraju	1,063	0.64%	▼0.42
Margin of victory		441	0.26%	▼12.44
Turnout		165,744	80.19%	▲5.79
Total valid votes		165,744		
BRS hold		Swing	▼6.22	

=== Assembly Election 2014 ===
2014 Telangana Legislative Assembly election : Dharmapuri
Party	Candidate	Votes	%	±%
BRS	Koppula Eshwar	67,836	47.70%	▼20.27
INC	Adluri Laxman Kumar	49,157	35.00%	▲12.18
TDP	Gaddam Rajesh	13,267	9.33%	New
BJP	Kannam Anjaiah	4,266	3.00%	New
NOTA	None of the above	1,554	1.06%	New
BSP	Thadagonda Nagaraju	1,510	1.06%	New
Margin of victory		18,679	12.70%	▼32.45
Turnout		142,203	74.40%	▲8.72
Total valid votes		142,203		
BRS hold		Swing	▼16.23	

=== Assembly By-election 2010 ===
2010 Andhra Pradesh Legislative Assembly by-election : Dharmapuri
Party	Candidate	Votes	%	±%
TRS	Koppula Eshwar	86,720	67.97%	▲27.05
INC	Adluri Laxman Kumar	27,636	21.82%	▼17.92
TDP	A. Sanjeev	7,652	6.00%	New
Margin of victory		59,084	45.15%	▲43.97
Turnout		127,577	65.68%	▼1.69
Total valid votes		127,577		
TRS hold		Swing	▲22.49	

=== Assembly Election 2009 ===
2009 Andhra Pradesh Legislative Assembly election : Dharmapuri
Party	Candidate	Votes	%	±%
TRS	Koppula Eshwar	45,848	40.92%	New
INC	Adluri Laxman Kumar	44,364	39.74%	New
PRP	Gaddam Rajesh	10,225	9.16%	New
BJP	Kannam Anjaiah	4,116	3.69%	New
LSP	D. Bheemiah	3,591	2.82%	New
Margin of victory		1,484	1.18%	New
Turnout		112,042	67.37%	New
Total valid votes		112,042		
TRS win		Swing	New	
