= Koratla =

Koratla may refer to:

- Korutla, also known as Koratla, a town in Telangana, India
- Koratla (Assembly constituency), a constituency of the Telangana Legislative Assembly, India
- Koratla railway station, an Indian Railways station
