= Medipalle =

Medipalle (or Medipally) may refer to:

- Medipally, Telangana, a town in Medchal district, Telangana, India
- Medipalle mandal, a mandal in Jagtial District, Telangana, India
- Medipalle, Jagitial, a village in Medipalle mandal
- Medipally Nakkartha, a village located in Yacharam Mandal, Rangareddy district, Telangana, India
- Medipally Sathyam, an Indian politician in the state of Telangana
