= Kalvakuntla Sanjay =

Indian politician and orthopaedician

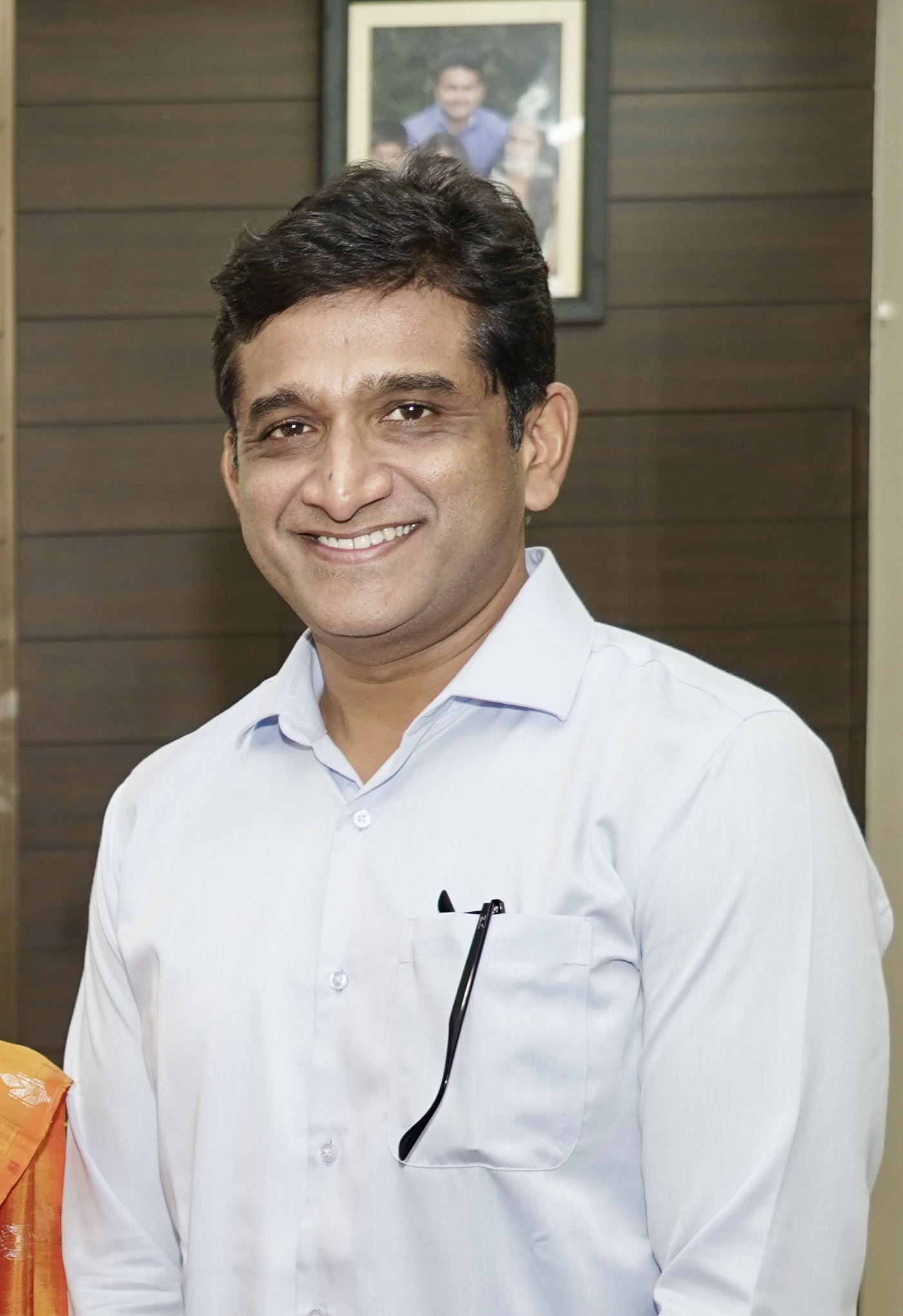

Member of Telangana Legislative Assembly
- Incumbent
- Assumed office 3 December 2023
- Preceded by: Kalvakuntla Vidya Sagar Rao
- Constituency: Koratla

Personal details
- Born: 18 October 1976 (age 49) Raghavapet village, Mallapur mandal, Jagtial district, Telangana, India
- Party: Bharat Rashtra Samithi
- Parent(s): Kalvakuntla Vidya Sagar Rao, Sarojana

Kalvakuntla Sanjay (born 18 October 1976) is an Indian politician from Telangana state. He is a member of the Telangana Legislative Assembly from Korutla Assembly constituency in Jagtial district. He represents Bharat Rashtra Samithi and won the 2023 Telangana Legislative Assembly election.

== Early life and education ==
Sanjay was born in Raghavapet village, Mallapur mandal, Jagtial district to Kalvakuntla Vidyasagar and Saroja. His father was a three time former MLA. He studied intermediate at Vignan College in Guntur from 1991 to 1993. Later, he did his master's degree in microbiology and biochemistry and passed his MBBS from B.M. Patel Medical College, Bijapur in 1999. He went on to complete his Master of Surgery at JSS Medical College, Mysuru, specialising in orthopaedics in 2003. Later, he started working in Yashoda hospitals group in Hyderabad.

== Political career ==
Sanjay won from Korutla Assembly constituency representing Bharat Rashtra Samithi in the 2023 Telangana Legislative Assembly election. He polled 72,115 votes and defeated his nearest rival, Dharmapuri Arvind of Bharatiya Janata Party, by a margin of 10,305 votes.
