= Donoor =

- village
- Location in Telangana, India Donoor (India)
- Coordinates: 18.985759°N 79.03529°E
- Country: India
- State: Telangana
- District: Karimnagar
- Elevation: 219 m (719 ft)

Languages
  - Official: Telugu
- Time zone: UTC+5:30 (IST)
- PIN: 505454
- Vehicle registration: TS
- Nearest city: Dharmapuri, Jagtial
- Lok Sabha constituency: Peddapalli
- Vidhan Sabha constituency: Dharmapuri
- Website: telangana.gov.in

Donoor is a small village in the Karimnagar district of Telangana. It is a small gram-panchayat with a population of just around 2500. It is around 8 kilometers from the temple town Dharmapuri.

== Infrastructure ==
=== Health care ===
A small government-funded primary care center supervised by a trained health care worker provides health education and first aid services. It does have a few registered medical practitioners (RMP) who help provide first aid. However it is a health care under-served area, with the nearest physician services available some 8 kilometers away. Lack of proper transportation services makes the availability of timely health care difficult.

There are people who can trace their roots back to this village.

=== Education ===
Donoor has a government upper primary school, which provides education for around 224 students. There are five secondary grade teachers and one ancillary staff.
