= Koratla Assembly constituency =

Constituency of the Telangana legislative assembly in India

Coordinates: 18.82°N 78.71°E

Koratla
- Constituency No. 20 for the Telangana Legislative Assembly
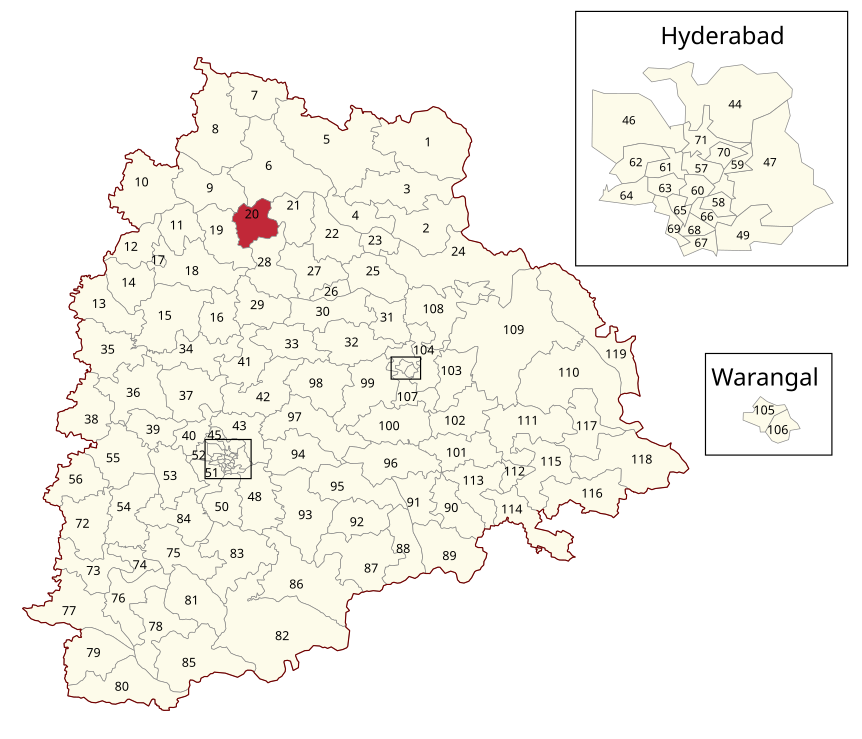
- Location of Koratla Assembly constituency within Telangana

Constituency details
- Country: India
- Region: South India
- State: Telangana
- District: Jagtial
- Lok Sabha constituency: Nizamabad
- Established: 2008
- Total electors: 1,86,704
- Reservation: None

Member of Legislative Assembly
- 3rd Telangana Legislative Assembly
- Incumbent Kalvakuntla Sanjay
- Party: Bharat Rashtra Samiti
- Elected year: 2023

Koratla Assembly constituency is a constituency of Telangana Legislative Assembly, India. It is one among three constituencies in Jagtial district. It is part of Nizamabad Lok Sabha constituency.

Kalvakuntla Sanjay of Bharat Rashtra Samithi is representing the constituency

== Mandals ==
The Assembly Constituency presently comprises the following Mandals:

Mandal
Koratla
Metpally
Mallapur
Ibrahimpatnam

== Members of the Legislative Assembly ==
Year	Member	Political party
United Andhra Pradesh
2009	Kalvakuntla Vidya Sagar Rao	Telangana Rashtra Samithi
2010★	Kalvakuntla Vidya Sagar Rao	Telangana Rashtra Samithi
Telangana
2014	Kalvakuntla Vidya Sagar Rao	Telangana Rashtra Samithi
2018	Kalvakuntla Vidya Sagar Rao	Telangana Rashtra Samithi
2023	Dr. Kalvakuntla Sanjay	Bharat Rashtra Samithi

★By election

=== Assembly Election 2023 ===
2023 Telangana Legislative Assembly election : Koratla
Party	Candidate	Votes	%	±%
BRS	Kalvakuntla Sanjay	72,115	39.28%	▼12.35
BJP	Dharmapuri Arvind	61,810	33.67%	▲23.88
INC	Juvvadi Narsinga Rao	39,647	21.60%	▼10.98
BSP	Nishanth Karthikeya Pudhari	2,466	1.34%	New
NOTA	None of the above	1,391	0.76%	▼0.72
Margin of victory		10,305	5.61%	▼13.44
Turnout		1,83,592	76.21%	▲0.37
Total valid votes		1,83,592		
BRS hold		Swing	▼12.35	

=== Assembly Election 2018 ===
2018 Telangana Legislative Assembly election : Koratla
Party	Candidate	Votes	%	±%
TRS	Kalvakuntla Vidya Sagar Rao	84,605	51.63%	▲12.53
INC	Juvvadi Narsinga Rao	53,385	32.58%	▲16.01
BJP	J. N. Venkat	16,046	9.79%	▼5.35
SP	Md. Rasheed Khan	3,540	2.16%	New
NOTA	None of the above	2,426	1.48%	New
Margin of victory		31,220	19.05%	▲5.38
Turnout		1,63,868	75.84%	New
Total valid votes		1,63,868		
TRS hold		Swing	▲12.53	

=== Assembly Election 2014 ===
2014 Telangana Legislative Assembly election : Koratla
Party	Candidate	Votes	%	±%
TRS	Kalvakuntla Vidya Sagar Rao	58,890	39.10%	▲6.72
Independent	Juvvadi Narsinga Rao	38,305	25.43%	New
INC	Komoreddy Ramulu	24,954	16.57%	▼3.78
BJP	Surabhi Bhum Rao	22,806	15.14%	▲2.60
Margin of victory		20,585	13.67%	▲1.64
Turnout		1,50,613	69.80%	New
Total valid votes		1,50,613		
TRS hold		Swing	▲6.72	

=== Assembly By-election 2010 ===
2010 Andhra Pradesh Legislative Assembly by-election : Koratla
Party	Candidate	Votes	%	±%
TRS	Kalvakuntla Vidya Sagar Rao	80,495	64.68%	▲32.30
INC	Juvvadi Rathnakar Rao	23,970	19.26%	▼1.09
Independent	P. Rajalingam	4,874	3.92%	New
TDP	S. Vishwanatham	3,800	3.05%	New
Margin of victory		56,525	45.42%	▲33.39
Turnout		1,24,453	66.80%	New
Total valid votes		1,24,453		
TRS hold		Swing	▲32.30	

=== Assembly Election 2009 ===
2009 Andhra Pradesh Legislative Assembly election : Koratla
Party	Candidate	Votes	%	±%
TRS	Kalvakuntla Vidya Sagar Rao	41,861	32.38%	New
INC	Juvvadi Rathnakar Rao	26,316	20.35%	New
PRP	Jangili Sunitha Venkat	20,680	15.99%	New
BJP	Tummala Mamatha Reddy Damu	16,219	12.54%	New
Independent	M. A. Gaffar	14,612	11.30%	New
Margin of victory		15,545	12.03%	New
Turnout		1,29,282	66.52%	New
Total valid votes		1,29,282		
TRS win		Swing	New	

== See also ==
- List of constituencies of Telangana Legislative Assembly
