= Muthunur =

Muthunoor
- Village
- Location in Telangana, India Muthunoor (India)
- Coordinates: 18.8°N 79.4°E
- Country: India
- State: Telangana
- District: Karimnagar district

Languages
  - Official: Telugu
- Time zone: UTC+5:30 (IST)
- PIN: 505526
- Telephone code: 08724
- Vehicle registration: TS 02
- Nearest town: Jagityal
- Literacy: 9 %
- Lok Sabha constituency: Karimnagar
- Website: telangana.gov.in

Muthunoor (also Muthunur) is a village in Velgatoor mandal in the Jagitial District, Telangana, India.

== Geography ==
Muthunoor is situated near the bank of river Godavari. The village is positioned between Ramnoor and Mokkatraopet. Hyderabad is about 178 km from this hinterland. Agriculture is the main source of income. Paddy and Cotton are the main crops grown here.

== Assembly constituency ==
This village comes under Dharmapuri assembly constituency.
