= Vellulla =

- Village
- Location in Telangana, India Vellulla (India)
- Coordinates: 18.820044°N 78.616962°E
- Country: India
- State: Telangana
- District: Jagtial
- Talukas: Metpally
- Elevation: 302 m (991 ft)

Population
  - Total: 5,000

Languages
  - Official: Telugu, Urdu
- Time zone: UTC+5:30 (IST)
- PIN: 505325
- Vehicle registration: TS
- Website: telangana.gov.in

Vellulla is a village in Metpally mandal, Jagtial district, Telangana, India. Vellulla is 4.6 kilometers away from its mandal's main town Metpally and 160 kilometers away from Hyderabad.

== Vellulla Yellamma Temple ==
The Vellulla Yellamma Temple is dedicated to Yellamma, a Hindu goddess believed to cure all diseases. Being a notorious temple in the local region, it attracts visitors from Jagtial, Karimnagar, Nizamabad, Adilabad districts.
