= Adluri Laxman Kumar =

Member of Legislative Assembly Telangana

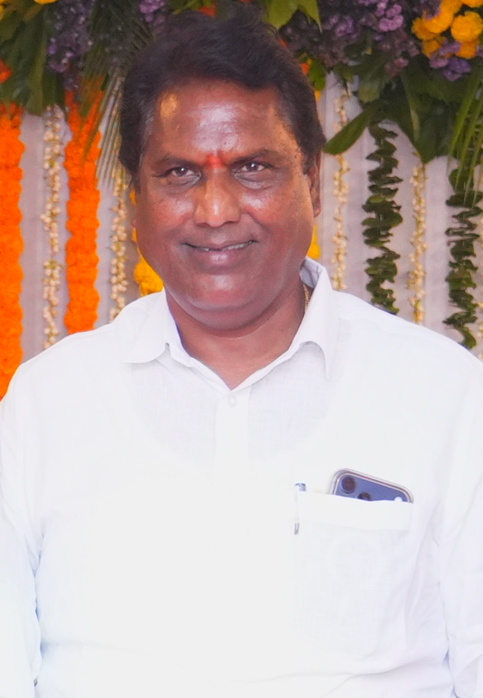
- Kumar in 2025

Minister for Scheduled Castes Development, Tribal Welfare, Minorities Welfare, Empowerment of Persons with Disabilities, Senior Citizens & Transgender Persons Government of Telangana
- Incumbent
- Assumed office 8 June 2025

Member of Telangana Legislative Assembly
- Incumbent
- Assumed office 03 December 2023
- Preceded by: Koppula Eshwar
- Constituency: Dharmapuri

Zilla Praja Parishad, Chairman Karimnagar District United Andhra Pradesh 2009-2011

Personal details
- Born: 1 April 1968 Peddapalli, Telangana
- Party: Indian National Congress
- Spouse: Kanthakumari
- Parent(s): Adluri Nagaiah, Lakshmi

Adluri Laxman Kumar (born 1 April 1968) is an Indian politician from Telangana state. He is an MLA from Dharmapuri Assembly constituency which is reserved for SC community in Jagtial district. He represents Indian National Congress Party and won the 2023 Telangana Legislative Assembly election.

He was appointed as In charge minister for Nalgonda District on 12 June 2025.

== Early life and education ==
Kumar is from Karimnagar. He was born to Nagaiah. He did his schooling in Godavari Khani and passed Class 10 in 1982. Later, he completed ITI diploma at Peddapalli in 1985. He is a retired head of the economics department at SRR Arts and Science College, Karimnagar.

== Career ==
Adluri Laxman Kumar won the 2023 Telangana Legislative Assembly election from Dharmapuri Assembly constituency representing the Indian National Congress. He polled 91,393 votes, and defeated his nearest rival Koppula Eshwar of Bharat Rashtra Samithi by a margin of 22,039 votes.

Adluri Laxman Kumar took oath as Minister in Revanth Reddy's Cabinet on Sunday 8 June 2025. He was allocated Scheduled Castes Development, Tribal Welfare Department, Minorities Welfare and Department for Empowerment of Persons ministries on 11 June 2025.

| Year | Constituency | Election Type | Party | Votes | % | Opponent | Opponent Party | Result | Margin |
|---|---|---|---|---|---|---|---|---|---|
| 1999 | Medaram | Assembly | INC | 34,124 | 31.25% | Matangi Narsaiah | TDP | Lost | 22,118 |
| 2009 | Dharmapuri | Assembly | INC | 44,364 | 34.73% | Koppula Eshwar | TRS | Lost | 1,484 |
| 2010 (By-poll) | Dharmapuri | Assembly | INC | 27,829 | 24.29% | Koppula Eshwar | TRS | Lost | 58,891 |
| 2014 | Dharmapuri | Assembly | INC | 49,157 | 33.47% | Koppula Eshwar | TRS | Lost | 18,679 |
| 2018 | Dharmapuri | Assembly | INC | 70,138 | 42.32% | Koppula Eshwar | TRS | Lost | 441 |
| 2023 | Dharmapuri | Assembly | INC | 91,393 | 50.30% | Koppula Eshwar | BRS | Won | 22,039 |

| Tenure | Position / Ministry | Chief Minister | Government / State | Party |
|---|---|---|---|---|
| 1996 – 2001 | General Secretary, Andhra Pradesh Youth Congress | — | United Andhra Pradesh | INC |
| 2006 – 2011 | ZPTC Member (Dharmaram Constituency) | — | United Andhra Pradesh | INC |
| 2010 – 2012 | Chairman, Karimnagar Zilla Parishad | K. Rosaiah / N. Kiran Kumar Reddy | United Andhra Pradesh | INC |
| 2013 – 2014 | Chairman, State SC Corporation | N. Kiran Kumar Reddy | United Andhra Pradesh | INC |
| 2023 – 2025 | Government Chief Whip | Revanth Reddy | Telangana | INC |
| 8 June 2025 – Present | Minister for Scheduled Castes Development, Tribal Welfare, Minorities Welfare, Empowerment of Persons with Disabilities, Senior Citizens & Transgender Persons | Revanth Reddy | Telangana | INC |
| 2023 – Present | Member of Legislative Assembly (MLA) | — | Telangana | INC |
