= Jagadevpet =

Coordinates: 18.821°N 79.152°E

Jagadevpet is a village in Velgatoor mandal, Karimnagar district, Telangana, South India. Its population is around 4,000 people.

Closest local settlements are Velgatoor and Charlapalli, both around 6 kilometres (4 mi) away and Dharmaram 13 kilometres (8 mi) away. The state's main city of Hyderabad is just under 180 kilometres (112 mi) away.

Jagadevpet has a government school teaching children up to the age of seven years.
