= Vallampally =

- Village
- Location in Telangana, India Vallampally (India)
- Coordinates: 18.7832232°N 78.7775517°E
- Country: India
- State: Telangana
- District: Karimnagar

Languages
  - Official: Telugu
- Time zone: UTC+5:30 (IST)
- Vehicle registration: TS

Vallampally is a small village located 65 km away from the district headquarters of Karimnagar district, Telangana, India. The Right Canal from the Pochampad project runs at the boundary of the village. Its closest towns are Korutla and Jagityal. It is accessible from Mohanraopet on NH-563. Shared-autos and private vehicles regularly ply between both the villages.

Vallampally has mixed population from various sections of society including cloth-weavers, farmers and small-time traders. Many families have family members working in Mumbai and middle east like Dubai and other gulf countries, and there is a strong association with people living abroad. Much of the younger generations have moved to towns and cities like Hyderabad, Bangalore and Pune in search of jobs in industry. The women in the village generally engage in beedi-rolling and agricultural forming works; which is a cottage-industry very popular in this region of Telangana.
