= Sarangapur =

Sarangapur may refer to:

- Sarangapur, Jagtial district, a village in Telangana, India
- Sarangapur, Nirmal district, a village in Telangana, India

== See also ==
- Sarangpur (disambiguation)
