= Sai Baba Mandir =

Sai Baba Mandir may refer to:

- any temple or mandir dedicated to either Sai Baba of Shirdi or Sathya Sai Baba
- Sai Shiva Balaji Mandir, Dharmapuri
