= Varshakonda =

- village
- Location in Telangana, India
- Coordinates: 18°54′33″N 78°32′16″E
- Country: India
- State: TELANGANA

Languages
  - Official: Telugu
- Time zone: UTC+5:30 (IST)
- Postal code: 505450
- Vehicle registration: TS

Varshakonda is a village in the Jagityal district of Telangana, India. It follows a panchayat form of government, where Sarpanch is the head of the village.
