= Kalvakota =

Coordinates: 18°45′50.84″N 78°46′58.94″E

Kalvakota is a village in the Jagtial district of Telangana State, India.
