= Dubba Rajeswara Temple =

Hindu temple in Telangana, India

Sri Dubba Rajeshwara Swamy Temple
- Sri Dubba Rajeswara Swamy Temple in Pembatla during Sri Rama Navami celebrations.

- Location in Telangana Dubba Rajeswara Temple (India)

Religion
- Affiliation: Hinduism
- District: Jagtial district
- Deity: Dubba Rajeswara Swamy (Shiva)

Location
- Location: Pembatla village, Sarangapur mandal
- State: Telangana
- Country: India
- Coordinates: 18°52.22′N 78°56.27′E

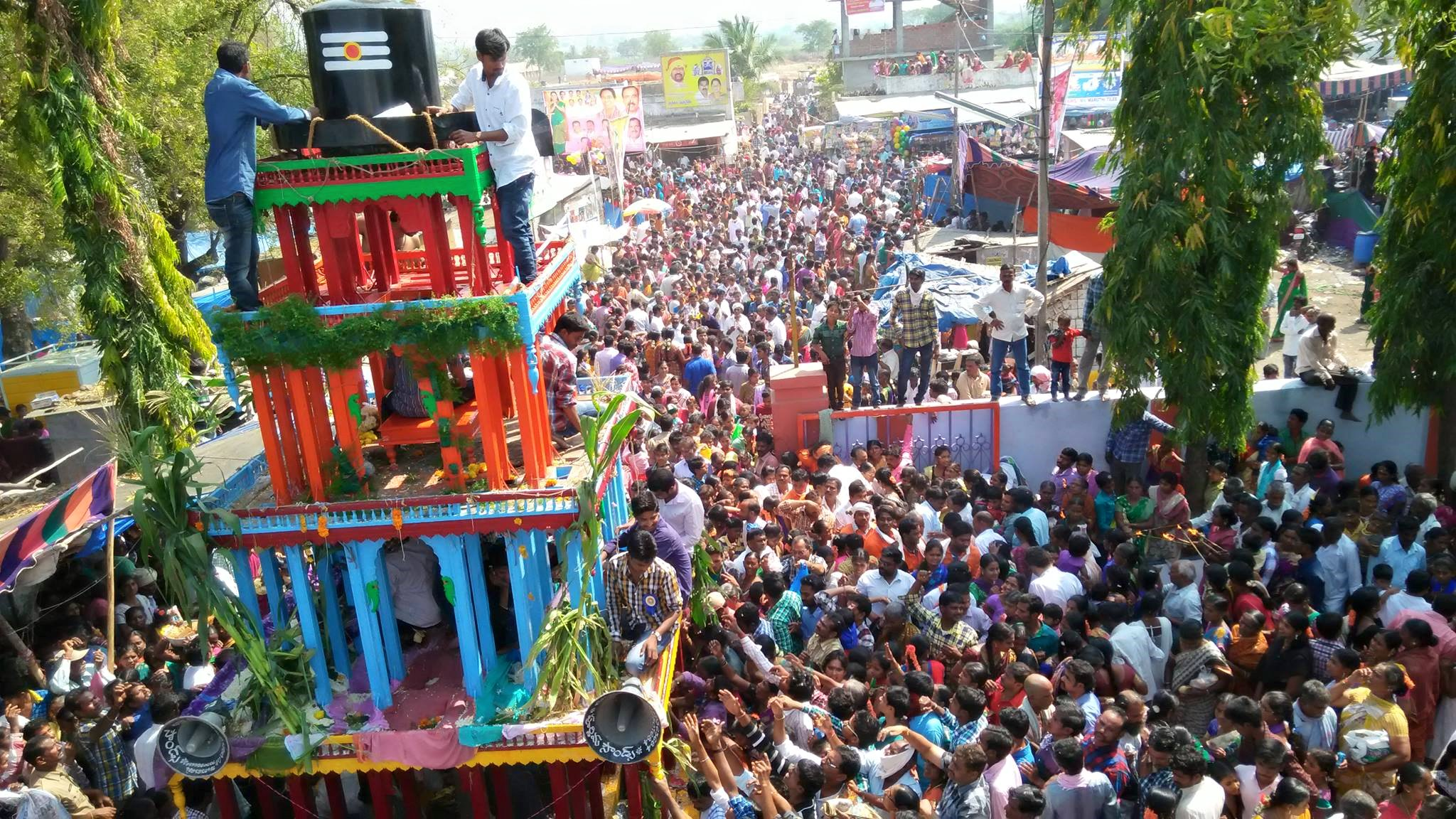
Sri Dubba Rajanna Rathotsavam at Pembatla-Konapur for Maha Shivarathri on Feb 19, 2015.

Sri Dubba Rajeshwara Swamy Devasthanam is a Hindu temple in the village of Pembatla, Sarangapur mandal, Karimnagar District, Telangana, India. It is one of the oldest and most famous temples in Karimnagar District, primarily worshipping Shiva in the form of Dubba Rajeswara Swamy.

Maha Shivaratri is the biggest festival celebrated at the temple. Other festivals celebrated include Sri Krishna Janmastami, Dasara, Vinakaya chaturthi, Sri Rama Navami, Deepavali, and many more.

The temple is situated 8 km from Jagtial and 57 km from Karimnagar, Telangana. TSRTC provides special buses on the occasion of the Maha Shivaratri from Jagtial to the temple.
