= Korutla Stepwell =

- కోరుట్ల మెట్లబావి (Telugu)
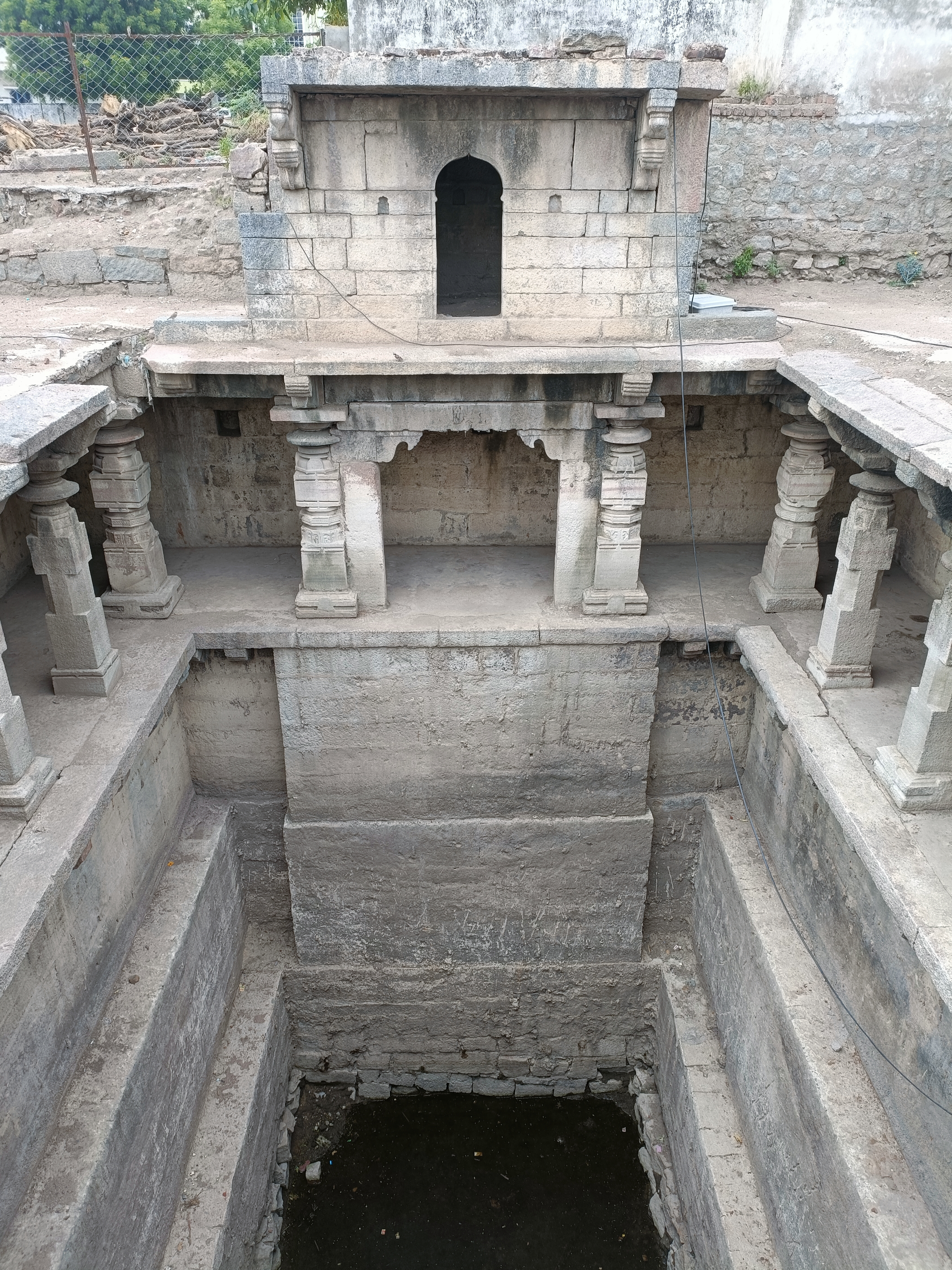
- Korutla Stepwell (also called as Metla Baavi or Koneru) constructed during 10th century.

- Location in Telangana Location in India
- 18.819221784519534°N 78.71485483819446°E
- Location: Korutla, Telangana, India

History
- Built: 11th century

Site notes
- Restored: 2023
- Restored by: Pratistha, Archaeological Survey of India
- Governing body: Government of Telangana

Korutla Stepwell (also called as Metla Baavi or Koneru) is a stepwell in the town of Korutla, located in the Jagtial district of the Indian state of Telangana. It was constructed during the 11th century by Polvasa rulers who were Jaina patrons of the stepwell. The stepwell had many purposes such as providing water for daily chores, being a place of retreat for travelers, and a place where Bathukamma was celebrated. In 2023, the Korutla Municipality along with Pratistha, a team of architects and urbanists from Hyderabad, took on the restoration project.

== History ==
The Korutla Stepwell was built in the 11th century by the Polavasa rulers to supply water and serve as a resting place for travelers. Over time it fell into disuse and the precinct became a dumping yard as local residents discarded waste on the site. In April 2023, a team of architects and heritage enthusiasts from Pratistha documented the structure and its surroundings using drone photography. Later that year the Korutla Municipality cleared debris, installed fencing, and began conservation work under a heritage-restoration project supported by state authorities.

== Architecture ==
The stepwell is a rectangular pushkarini measuring about 12 m by 8 m with five descending levels of broad stone steps bordered by plain stone walls. Each level features regularly spaced niches that once held oil lamps to illuminate the stairways at night. At the base is a water tank lined with dressed stone blocks and fitted with drainage channels to manage monsoon overflow. The uppermost landing retains evidence of a former mandapa entrance framed by bracketed stone supports and simple corbelled arches. Continuous stone banding marks each tier line and provides visual cohesion while protecting the carvings and masonry from weathering.
