= Kruthivennu mandal =

- Mandal
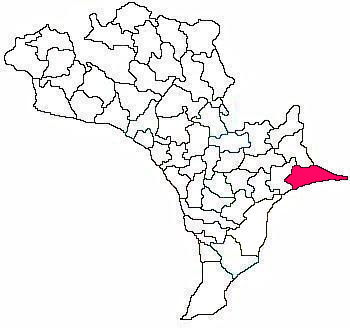
- Kruthivennu mandal in Krishna district
- Interactive map of Kruthivennu mandal
- Location in Andhra Pradesh, India
- Coordinates: 16°24′21″N 81°21′28″E
- Country: India
- State: Andhra Pradesh
- District: Krishna
- Headquarters: Kruthivennu

Government
  - Body: Mandal Parishad

Area
  - Total: 180.96 km^{2} (69.87 sq mi)

Population (2011)
  - Total: 48,892
  - Density: 270.18/km^{2} (699.77/sq mi)

Languages
  - Official: Telugu
- Time zone: UTC+5:30 (IST)
- Vehicle registration: AP 16

Kruthivennu mandal is one of the 25 mandals in Krishna district of the Indian state in Andhra Pradesh. The headquarters of this mandal is located in the town of Kruthivennu. The mandal is bordered by Kalidindi mandal to the north, West Godavari district to the east, Bay of Bengal to the south and Bantumilli mandal to the west.

== Demographics ==
As of 2011, the Mandal census stated a population of 48,892 people living in 13,830 households. The total population consists of 24,405 males and 24,487 females, with a ratio of 1003 females to 1000 males. There are 4,753 children in the age group of 0–6 years, of which 2,438 are boys and 2,315 are girls. The average literacy rate stands at 65.97% with 29,119 literates, of which 15,360 are males and 13,759 are females. There are 2,303 members of the Scheduled Castes and 1,034 members of the Scheduled Tribes.

=== Labor Statistics ===
As per the report published by the Census of India in 2011, 24,621 people are engaged in work activities, including 15,338 males and 9,283 females. In the census, 15,764 workers describe their work as main work, 1,778 as cultivators, 9,283 as agricultural labourers, 309 in household industry and 4,394 are involved in other works. Of these, 8,857 are marginal workers.

== Administration ==
Kruthivennu mandal is administered under the Pedana Assembly constituency of the Machilipatnam Lok Sabha constituency. It is one of the twelve mandals that fall under the Machilipatnam revenue division.

== Towns and villages ==
As of 2011 census, there are a total of 15 settlements in the mandal. Kruthivennu is the largest and Tadivennu is the smallest in terms of population.

The settlements in the mandal are:

1. Chandala
2. Cherkumilli
3. Chinagollapalem
4. Chinapandraka
5. Endapalll
6. Garisepudi
7. Interu
8. Komallapudi
9. Kruthivennu
10. Laxmipuram
11. Matlam
12. Munipeda
13. Neelipudi
14. Nidamarru
15. Tadivennu

== Education ==
The mandal plays a major role in education for the rural students of nearby villages. Primary and secondary school education is imparted by government, aided by private schools, under the School Education Department of the state. As per the school information report for the academic year 2015–16, the mandal has more than 4,887 students enrolled in over 76 schools.

== See also ==
- List of mandals in Andhra Pradesh
- Vijayawada
