= Katlakunta =

Katlakunta Jagadeka Patnam
- Village
- Country: India
- State: Telangana
- District: jagtial
- Mandal: Medipalli

Languages
  - Official: Telugu
- Time zone: UTC+5:30 (IST)
- PIN: 505453

Katlakunta is a village in Jagtial district, of Telangana.
