= Kodimial =

- Village
- Location in Telangana, India Kodimial (India)
- Coordinates: 18.6333°N 78.9000°E
- Country: India
- State: Telangana
- District: Jagtial
- Mandal: Kodimial
- Elevation: 387 m (1,270 ft)

Languages
  - Official: Telugu
- Time zone: UTC+5:30 (IST)
- PIN: 505501
- Vehicle registration: TS 02

Kodimial is a village in Kodimial mandal of Jagtial district in the state of Telangana in India.

== Geography ==
Kodimial is located at 18.6333°N 78.9000°E. It has an average elevation of 387 meters (1272 feet).
