= Medipalle, Jagitial =

Medipalle
- Village
- Interactive map of Medipalle
- Coordinates: 18°48′01″N 78°48′15″E
- Country: India
- State: Telangana
- District: Karimnagar
- Talukas: Medipalle

Languages
  - Official: Telugu
- Time zone: UTC+05:30 (IST)

Medipalle is a village in Medipalle mandal of Jagitial district in the state of Telangana in India.

== Demographics ==
According to 2011 Census, population of the village stands at 6,054.
