= Kruthivennu =

- Village
- Interactive map of Kruthivennu
- Location in Andhra Pradesh, India Kruthivennu (India)
- Coordinates: 16°24′21″N 81°21′28″E
- Country: India
- State: Andhra Pradesh
- District: Krishna
- Mandal: Kruthivennu

Area
  - Total: 22.14 km^{2} (8.55 sq mi)
- Elevation: 3 m (9.8 ft)

Population (2011)
  - Total: 7,585
  - Density: 342.6/km^{2} (887.3/sq mi)

Languages
  - Official: Telugu
- Time zone: UTC+5:30 (IST)
- Postal code: 521324
- Vehicle registration: AP

Kruthivennu is a village in Krishna district of the Indian state of Andhra Pradesh.

== See also ==
- Villages in Kruthivennu mandal
