= Kathlapur mandal =

Kathlapur
- Mandal
- Location in Telangana, India Kathlapur (India)
- Coordinates: 18°44′50″N 78°41′5″E
- Country: India
- State: Telangana
- District: Jagtial
- Talukas: Kathlapur

Languages
  - Official: Telugu
- Time zone: UTC+5:30 (IST)
- Postal code: 505462
- Vehicle registration: TS 21
- Website: telangana.gov.in

Kathlapur is a mandal in Jagtial district in the state of Telangana in India.

== Panchayats ==
The following is the list of village panchayats in Kathlapur mandal"

1. Bommena
2. Bhushanraopet
3. Ambaripet
4. Chinta Kunta
5. Duluru
6. Dumpet
7. Gambeerpur
8. Ippapally
9. Kalikota
10. Kathlapoor
11. Ottapally
12. Peggarla
13. Posanipet
14. Potharam
15. Sirkonda
16. Thakkalapally
17. Thandrial
18. Thurthy
