= Koratla railway station =

Railway station in Telangana, India

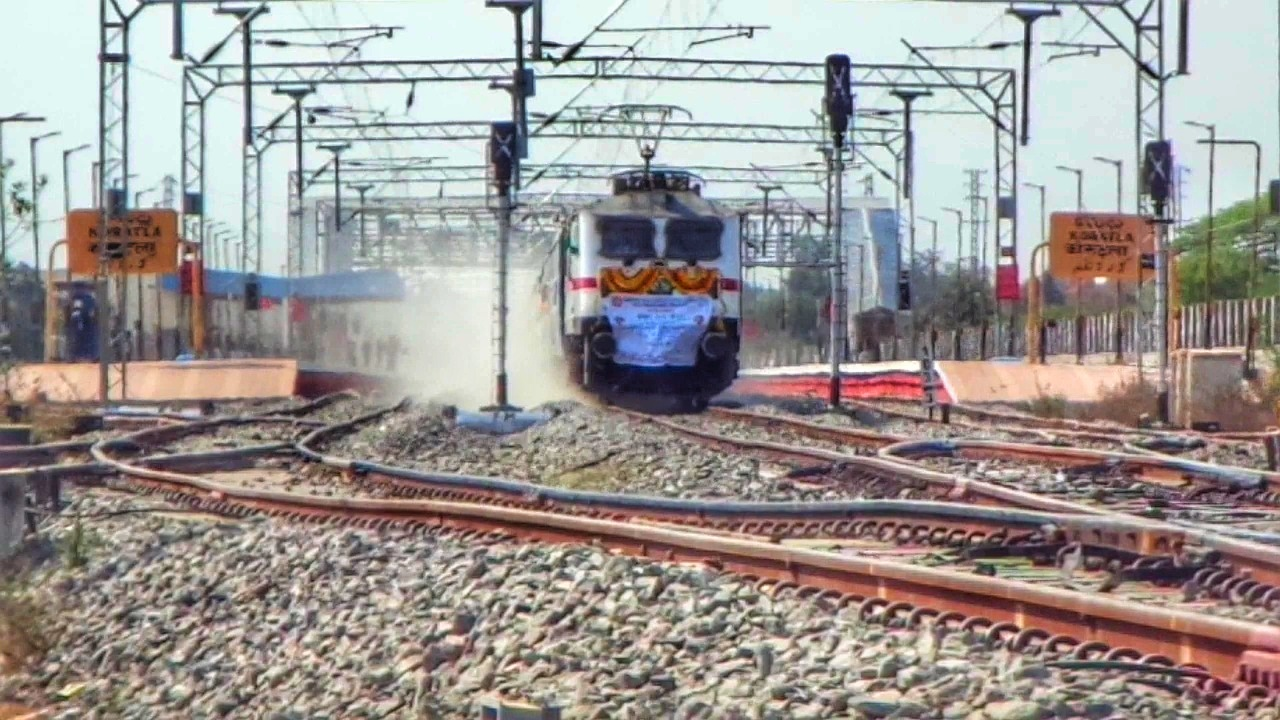
- CRS rake skipping KRLA station, in return from Morthad, on its first day of electrified route

General information
- Location: Koratla Railway Station Road, Korutla; India
- Coordinates: 18°50′08″N 78°42′38″E
- Elevation: 296 m (971 ft)
- System: Inter-city and Regional rail station
- Owner: Indian Railways
- Operator: South Central Railway zone
- Line: Peddapalli–Nizamabad section
- Platforms: 2
- Tracks: 3 5 ft 6 in (1,676 mm) broad gauge

Construction
- Structure type: Standard (on ground)

Other information
- Status: Active
- Station code: KRLA
- Zone(s): SCR
- Division(s): Secunderabad
- Classification: Non-suburban grade-6 (NSG-6)

History
- Opened: 2016; 10 years ago
- Electrified: Yes (12 March 2021)

Services
Preceding station	Indian Railways	Following station
Lingampet–Jagityal (LPJL) towards ?	Peddapalli–Nizamabad section	Metpalli (MTPI) towards ?
Location
- Location within Telangana Location within India

Koratla railway station (Station Code: KRLA) comes under Peddapalli–Nizamabad section. It is an Indian Railways station which serves the town Korutla of Jagtial District in Telangana. It is a major station after Lingampet - Jagityal station (LPJL) and Karimnagar railway station (KRMR). It is administered under Secunderabad railway division of South Central Railway zone of Indian Railways.

== History ==
Koratla railway station comes under Peddapalli–Nizamabad line. On 30 June 1993, P. V. Narasimha Rao has sanctioned Peddapalli–Nizamabad line. After 23 years, in 2016, the line was inaugurated.

== Arrivals and departures ==
- To Karimnagar 07893 - Bodhan - Karimnagar MEMU - 06:15 AM every day
- To Karimnagar 07793 - Kacheguda - Peddapalli DEMU - 11:40 AM every day
- To Hyderabad 07794 - Peddapalli - Kacheguda DEMU - 04:35 PM every day
- To Bodhan 07894 - Karimnagar - Bodhan MEMU - 04:55 PM every day
- To Mumbai 07195 - Kazipet Jn - Dadar Central - 08:21 PM every Wednesday
- To Warangal 07196 - Dadar central - Kazipet Jn - 02:30 PM every Friday

Apart from these six passenger trains, an average of 20 freight trains pass through the station every day.
