= Koppula Eshwar =

Indian politician

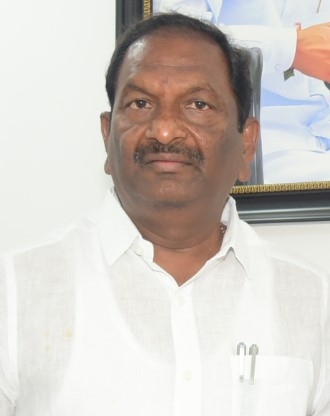

Minister for Scheduled Castes Development, Minorities Welfare, Disabled Welfare and Senior Citizens Welfare
- In office 2019 – 4 December 2023
- Constituency: Dharmapuri Assembly constituency

Personal details
- Born: 20 April 1959 (age 67) Godavarikhani
- Party: Telangana Rashtra Samithi

Koppula Eshwar is an Indian politician who has served as the Minister for Scheduled Castes Development, Minority Welfare, Disabled Welfare and Senior Citizens Welfare, Government of Telangana. He belongs to Telangana Rashtra Samithi. He won as a Member of Legislative Assembly (M.L.A.) from Dharmapuri constituency in Karimnagar assembly constituency.

== Electoral history ==
Year	Constituency	Party	Votes	Opponent		Result	Margin
1994	Medaram	TDP	31,450	INC	Gaddam Mathangi Narsaiah	Lost	-12,310
2004	Medaram	TRS	75,810	TDP	Gaddam Mathangi Narsaiah	Won	36,540
2008 (By-election)	Medaram	TRS	59,230	INC	Malyamshetti Ramaswamy	Won	14,320
2009	Dharmapuri	TRS	45,870	INC	Adluri Laxman Kumar	Won	1,484
2010 (By-election)	Dharmapuri	TRS	83,920	INC	Adluri Laxman Kumar	Won	58,970
2014	Dharmapuri	TRS	67,836	INC	Adluri Laxman Kumar	Won	18,679
2018	Dharmapuri	TRS	70,579	INC	Adluri Laxman Kumar	Won	441
2023	Dharmapuri	BRS	69,354	INC	Adluri Laxman Kumar	Lost	-22,039
2024	Peddapalle	BRS	193,356	INC	Gaddam Vamsi Krishna	Lost	-282,231

== Life ==
Eshwar was born in Kummarikunta village of Julapalli Mandal, Karimnagar district in a Scheduled caste community. His mother is Mallamma and father Lingaiah.

== Political career ==
Koppula Eshwar was born on April 20, 1959, and is a Graduate in Arts. A six time MLA from Karimnagar district, he started his political career in Telugu Desam Party in 1994 and continued as MLA from Medaram Assembly constituency and later from Dharmapuri Assembly constituency.

He joined TRS in 2001 and actively participated in Telangana agitation. He was elected MLA from Medaram constituency in 2004 after Matangi Narsaiah retired. He was reelected in 2008 from Medaram, 2009 in general elections, and 2010 by elections from Dharmapuri.

He worked in Singareni Collieries Company Limited for 26 years and served as Government Chief Whip from 2014 to 2018.

== Positions held ==
Telangana Cabinet Ministry of Scheduled Castes Development, Tribal Welfare, BC Welfare, Minority Welfare, Disabled Welfare and Senior Citizens Welfare	2019–2023
Government Chief Whip	2014- 2018

== Political statistics ==
Koppula Eshwar contested as Member of Legislative Assembly from Medaram and Dharmapuri (Assembly constituency).

	Year		Year Up To	Contested For	Constituency	Result	Political Party	
1	2001					Joined	TRS	
2	2004	to	2008	MLA	Medaram Assembly Constituency	Won	TRS	General Election
3	2008				For Telangana agitation	Resigned		
4	2008 (By Polls)	to	2009	MLA	Medaram Assembly Constituency	Won	TRS	By-Election
5	2009	to	2010	MLA	Dharmapuri Assembly Constituency	Won	TRS	General Election
6	2010				For Telangana agitation	Resigned		
7	2010 (By Polls)	to	2014	MLA	Dharmapuri Assembly Constituency	Won	TRS	By-Election
8	2014	to	2018	MLA	Dharmapuri Assembly Constituency	Won	TRS	General Election
9	2018	to	2023	MLA	Dharmapuri Assembly Constituency	Won	TRS	General Election
