= Kalvakuntla Vidya Sagar Rao =

Indian politician

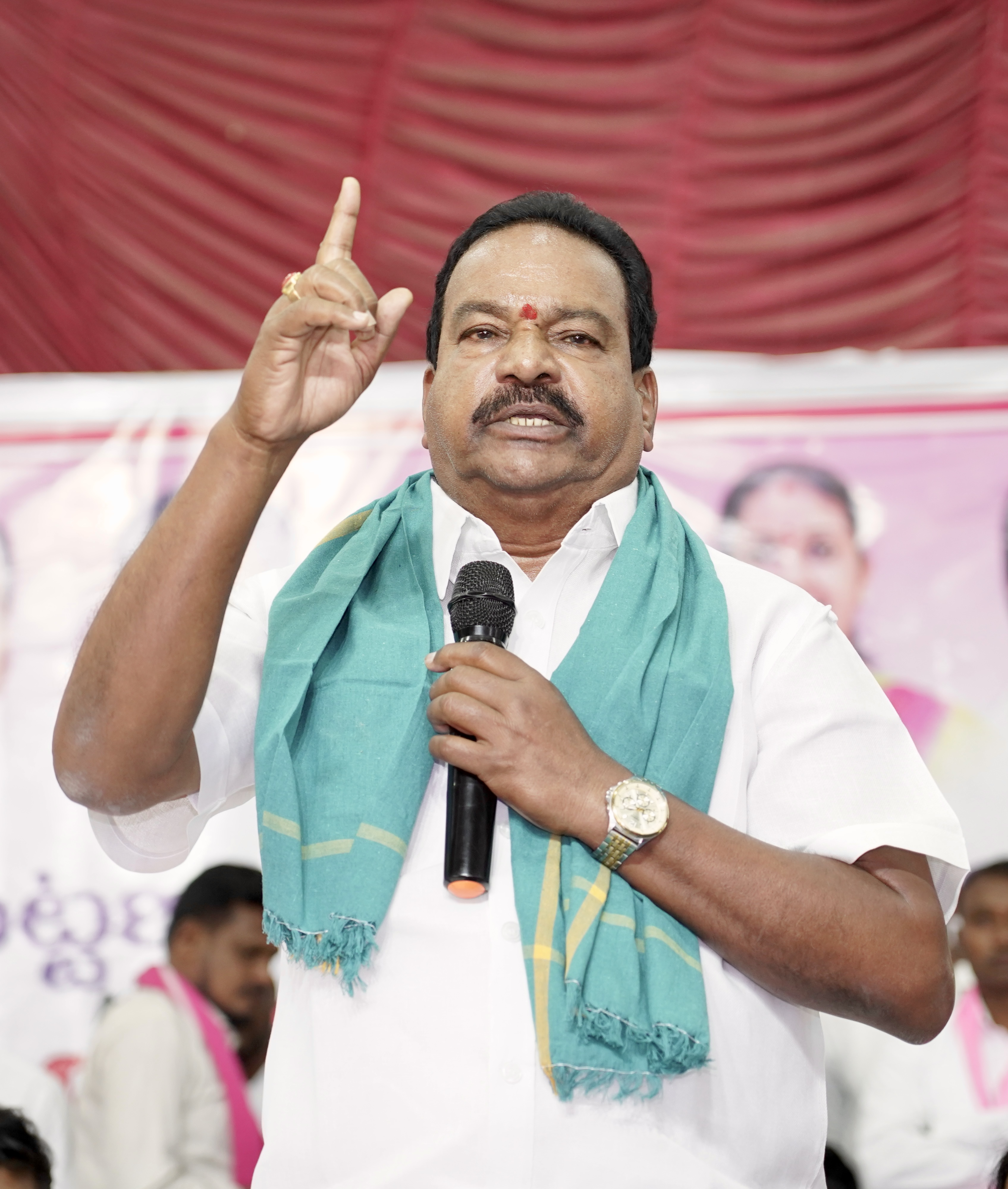

Member of Andhra Pradesh Legislative Assembly
- In office 2009–2014
- Preceded by: Constituency established
- Succeeded by: Himself
- Constituency: Koratla (Andhra Pradesh Until 2014)

Member of the Telangana Legislative Assembly
- In office 2014–2023
- Preceded by: Himself
- Succeeded by: Kalvakuntla Sanjay
- Constituency: Koratla (Telangana after 2014)

Personal details
- Born: 1953 (age 72–73) Telangana, India
- Party: Bharat Rashtra Samithi

Kalvakuntla Vidya Sagar Rao (born 1953) is an Indian politician from Telangana. He is a three time Member of the Legislative Assembly. He first won as a legislator in the United Andhra Pradesh in 2009 and later represented the Koratla Assembly constituency in the Telangana Legislative Assembly between 2014 and 2023.

== Early life and education ==
Rao is from Korutla, Karimnagar district, Telangana. He is the son of late Kalvakuntla Papa Rao. He completed his graduation in arts in 1973.

== Career ==
Rao was first elected as an MLA winning the 2009 Andhra Pradesh Legislative Assembly election from Koratla Assembly constituency representing the Telangana Rashtra Samithi. He polled 41,861 votes and defeated his nearest rival, Rathnakar Rao Juvvadi of the Indian National Congress, by a margin of 15,545 votes. He won again in the 2010 by election and retained the seat for the TRS in the 2014 Andhra Pradesh Legislative Assembly election defeating Juvvadi Narsinga Rao, an independent candidate, by a margin of 20,585 votes. He won a third consecutive term in the 2018 Telangana Legislative Assembly election defeating Narsinga Rao again, who contested this time on a Congress ticket.

He did not contest the 2023 Telangana Legislative Assembly election to pave way for his son Kalvakuntla Sanjay who won from Korutla.
