= Sai Shiva Balaji Mandir, Dharmapuri =

Religion
- Affiliation: Hinduism
- Deity: Sai Baba of Shirdi

Location
- Location: Dharmapuri, Karimnagar
- State: Andhra Pradesh
- Country: India
- Interactive map of Sai Shiva Balaji Mandir, Dharmapuri

Architecture
- Type: Mandir
- Creator: Sri Sai Shiva Balaji Mandir trust members

Website
- Sri Sai Shiva Balaji Mandir

Sai Shiva Balaji Mandir is a Hindu temple dedicated to Sai Baba of Shirdi. It is located at Dharmapuri in the Karimnagar district of Telangana in India. The temple is located on the banks of the Godavari River. The temple was built for the Shri Sai Shiva Balaji Mandir Trust by the trustees Shri V. Narsimha Shastry and his youngest son V.N. Pravin Shastry to spread the message of Sai Baba of Shirdi. The foundation stone was laid in 1994.

Visitors have to take off their shoes prior to visiting in order to maintain the sanctity of the temple complex.

== Accommodations ==
The Sai Bhaktha Nivas is a place made for the visitors where in rooms are available to stay, and also a kalyana mandapam (wedding hall) for some auspicious functions such as marriages, upanayana (sacred thread initiation ceremony), akshara bhyasam etcetera.
