= Sarangpur =

sarngpur may refer to:

- Sarangpur, Madhya Pradesh, a municipality in India
- Sarangpur (Vidhan Sabha constituency), Madhya Pradesh
- Sarangpur, Agra, a village in Uttar Pradesh, India
- an alternative spelling of Salangpur, a town in Gujarat, India

== See also ==
- Sarangapur (disambiguation)
