= Mallial =

- Village
- Location in Telangana, India Mallial (India)
- Coordinates: 18°42′14.857″N 78°56′59.492″E
- Country: India
- State: Telangana
- District: Jagtial
- Talukas: Mallial
- Elevation: 316 m (1,037 ft)

Population
  - Total: 11,684

Languages
  - Official: Telugu
- Time zone: UTC+5:30 (IST)
- PIN: 505 452
- Vehicle registration: TS
- Website: telangana.gov.in

Mallial is a mandal of Jagtial district in the state of Telangana in India.

== Geography ==
Malial is located at 18.7000°N 78.9667°E. It has an average elevation of 316 meters (1040 feet). It is located at 214 km distance from the state capital, Hyderabad.

== Villages ==
The villages in Mallial mandal include:

- Balwanthapur
- Gorregundam
- Maddutla
- Mallial
- Manala
- Muthyampeta
- Myadampalle
- Nookapalle
- Obulapur
- Potharam
- Rajaram
- Rampur
- Sarvapur
- Thakkallapalle
- Thatipalle
