= Chinapandraka =

- Village
- Interactive map of Chinapandraka
- Location in Andhra Pradesh, India
- Coordinates: 16.357°N 81.292°E
- Country: India
- State: Andhra Pradesh
- District: Krishna

Area
  - Total: 14.92 km^{2} (5.76 sq mi)

Population (2011)
  - Total: 5,448
  - Density: 365.1/km^{2} (945.7/sq mi)

Languages
  - Official: Telugu, Urdu
- Time zone: UTC+5:30 (IST)
- Vehicle registration: AP

Chinapandraka is a village in Kruthivennu mandal, located in Krishna district of the Indian state of Andhra Pradesh.
