= Medipalle mandal =

Medipalli
- Village
- Location in Telangana, India Medipalli (India)
- Coordinates: 18.4822°N 78.4850°E
- Country: India
- State: Telangana
- District: Jagtial

Languages
  - Official: Telugu
- Time zone: UTC+5:30 (IST)
- PIN: 505453
- Telephone code: 08724

Medipalle (or Medipalli) is a mandal in Jagtial District, Telangana, India.

== Villages ==
There are 19 villages in Medipalle mandal. They are:

1. Bheemaram
2. Dhammannapeta
3. Govindaram
4. Kacharam
5. Kalvakota
6. Katlakunta
7. Kondapur
8. Lingampeta
9. Machapur
10. Mannnegudem
11. Medipalle
12. Pasunoor
13. Porumalla
14. Raghojipeta
15. Rangapur
16. ThombaraoPeta
17. Vallampalle
18. Venkataraopeta
19. Voddedu
