= Endapalli, Karimnagar district =

Settlement in India

Endapalli is a mandal in Jagtial district in Telangana, India.

== Villages ==
- Endapalli
- Kondapur
- Gullakota
- Ambaripeta
- Kothapeta
- Godishelpet
- Shanabanda
- Pathagudur
- Suraram
- Padakal
- Munjampalli
- Maredupalli
- Undeda

== Demographics ==
Telugu is the local language. The total population of Endapalli is 5,267. The total area of Endapalli is 1,101 hectares (2,720 acres).
