= Endapalli, Annamayya district =

Village in Andhra Pradesh, India

Endapalli
- Village
- Interactive map of Endapalli
- Location in Andhra Pradesh, India Endapalli (India)
- Coordinates: 14.0432°N 78.6875°E
- Country: India
- State: Andhra Pradesh
- District: Annamayya
- Elevation: 143 m (469 ft)

Population (2011)
  - Total: 2,762

Languages
  - Official: Telugu
- Time zone: UTC+5:30 (IST)
- PIN: 516 269
- Vehicle registration: AP 04

Endapalli is a village in the Rayachoti mandal of the Annamayya district of Andhra Pradesh, India.
