= Allipur =

- Village
- Location in Uttar Pradesh, India Allipur (India)
- Coordinates: 27.72°N 78.75°E
- Country: India
- State: Uttar Pradesh
- District: Kashganj
- Post Office: Amanpur
- Elevation: 171 m (561 ft)

Population (2001)
  - Total: 1,200

Languages
  - Official: Hindi
- Time zone: UTC+5:30 (IST)
- PIN: 207241

Allipur is a village and a panchayat located in the Kasganj district of Uttar Pradesh, India.

== Demographics ==
As of 2001 India census, Allipur had a population of 1200. Males constitute 52% of the population and females 48%. Allipur has an average literacy rate of 55%, lower than the national average of 59.5%; with 60% of the males and 40% of females literate. 20% of the population is under 6 years of age.
