= Endapalli, Eluru district =

Endapalli
- Village
- Interactive map of Endapalli
- Location in Andhra Pradesh, India
- Coordinates: 17.2479°N 81.6432°E
- Country: India
- State: Andhra Pradesh
- District: Eluru
- Elevation: 21 m (69 ft)

Languages
  - Official: Telugu
- Time zone: UTC+5:30 (IST)
- PIN: 534 460
- Vehicle registration: AP 37
- Lok Sabha constituency: Eluru
- Climate: hot (Köppen)

Endapalli is a village in Eluru district of the Indian state of Andhra Pradesh. It is located in Chintalapudi mandal.
