= Gollapally, Jagtial district =

Gollapally
- village
- Location in Andhra Pradesh, India Gollapally (India)
- Coordinates: 18.790624°N 79.056906°E
- Country: India
- State: Telangana
- District: Jagtial

Languages
  - Official: Telugu
- Time zone: UTC+5:30 (IST)
- PIN: 505532
- Telephone code: 91-8724
- Vehicle registration: TS
- Nearest city: Jagtial
- Website: telangana.gov.in

Gollapally (also referred as Gollapalle or Gollapalli) is a village located in Gollapalle mandal of Jagtial district in Telangana, India. Before the reorganisation of districts in Telangana, Gollapally was part of Karimnagar district. And in this village there is a river named ganga

== Demographics ==
According to 2011 Census, village has a total population of 5,172, with 2,512 males and 2,660 females.
