= Medipally Nakkartha, Telangana =

Medipalli Nakkerta Nakkerta Medipally
- Village
- Nickname: Medipally
- Location in Telangana, India Medipalli Nakkerta (India)
- Coordinates: 17.003°N 78.654°E
- Country: India
- State: Telangana
- District: Ranga Reddy

Government
  - Type: Gram Panchayat

Area
  - Total: 21 km^{2} (8.1 sq mi)

Population (2025 (5489))
  - Total: 4,635
  - Rank: 3rd in Mandal
  - Density: 220/km^{2} (570/sq mi)

Languages
  - Official: Telugu
- Time zone: UTC+5:30 (IST)
- PIN: 501509
- Nearest city: Hyderabad
- Vidhan Sabha constituency: Ibrahim Patanam
- Website: telangana.gov.in

Medipally Nakkartha is a village located in Yacharam Mandal, Rangareddy district, Telangana, India, with a population of approximately 5,000 people. This village has a high school and a primary school, both are run by the government of Telangana. The primary languages used are that of Telugu and Urdu. The village sits at an elevation of 523 meters above the sea level.

== History ==
This village was under the control of Deshpandya and Deshmuk (Venkatrama Rao and Palamkush Rao). It was controlled by Grama Karnamu (Patvari), Grama Munsib (Police Inspector Karnati Jogi Reddy and Nijamuddin), and Grama Mali Patel (Revenue officer). The village was under the constituency of Ranga Reddy (Dist). Its name was formed with the combination of two villages, named Nakkartha and Medipally. A nearby village Nanak Nagar was also part of this village Panchayat until 1986.

== Geography ==
Nakkartha Medipally is located on the 17.003° north latitude and 78.654° east longitude. It has an average elevation of about 585 meters (1,919 feet) above sea level. The total area of the village is 2018 hectares. It is located in the Yacharam Mandal of Ranga Reddy district in Telangana, India. Near the well known Nagarjuna Sagar about 7 km away and is surrounded by the mountains on three sides.Nakkartha Medipally is part of Pharma City and Bharat Future city. Nakkartha Medipally irritated three lakes Saal Cheruvu, Urah Cheruvu and Kunta.

== Administration ==
Nakkartha Medipally is part Yacharam Mandal of Ibrahimpatnam Revenue Division. The Village has an Agriculture officer and Village is Part of Yacharam Society Bank. State Bank of India has its branch in the village. Hyderabad Green Pharma City Police station was established in the village in 2022.

== Education ==
Nakkartha Medipally has Zilla Parishad High School, a government primary school and four anganwadis. Children study in nearby schools in Yacharam and Mall namely Pudami School, Sri Chaitanya School, Jovial High School, St.Gregories Public school. Studying is done in Junior Government School, Gurunanak College, SCIENT Institute of Technology, Sri Indu,Sri Dattha and CVR College of Engineering.

== Politics ==
Sl.No	Sarpanch	Party	Time period
01	Gulam Yuddani	-	Example
02	Thota Achhaiah	Example	Example
03	Karnati Yadagiri Reddy	Example	Example
04	Karnati Ranga Reddy	Example	Example
05	Likki Nirmalamma	Example	Example
06	Boda Krishna	Example	Example
07	Erkala Balraj Goud	Example	Example
08	Pasha Basha	Congress	2014–present
