= Endapalle, Krishna district =

Endapalli
- Village
- Interactive map of Endapalli
- Coordinates: 17.10265°N 80.89312°E
- Country: India
- State: Andhra Pradesh
- District: Krishna

Government
  - Type: Gram Panchayat
  - Body: Endapalli Gram Panchayat

Area
  - Total: 7.20 km^{2} (2.78 sq mi)
- Elevation: 5 m (16 ft)

Population (2011)
  - Total: 1,074
  - Density: 149/km^{2} (386/sq mi)

Languages
  - Official: Telugu
- Time zone: UTC+5:30 (IST)
- Vehicle registration: AP 16

Endapalli is a village in Chintalapudi mandal, Eluru district, India.
