= Metpally =

Metpally Metpalle
- Town
- Location in Telangana, India Metpally (India)
- Coordinates: 18.8492°N 78.6261°E
- Country: India
- State: Telangana
- District: Jagityal
- Region: Deccan

Area
  - Total: 28.5 km^{2} (11.0 sq mi)
  - Rank: 1

Population (2011)
  - Total: 50,092
  - Density: 1,760/km^{2} (4,550/sq mi)

Languages
  - Official: Telugu, Urdu
- Time zone: UTC+5:30
- PIN: 505325
- Vehicle registration: TG–21
- Website: telangana.gov.in

Metpally is a town and Revenue Division and third largest town in Jagtial district of the Indian state of Telangana. It is located 222 km from the state capital Hyderabad, 67 km from Nizamabad, 80 km from Karimnagar and 33 km from district headquarters Jagtial. Many dynasties ruled including Sathavahanas and Kakatiyas. The Kakatiyas built a temple named Chennakesava.

== Government and politics ==
Metpally is in the Jagtial district. Metpally Municipality was constituted in 2005 and is classified as a third-grade municipality with 24 election wards. Metpally was once a thaluk and constituency for several years.

== Economy ==
The main occupation of the people surrounding this town is agriculture. A variety of crops are grown, including maize, turmeric, Paddy, soya, gingelly, castor, moong dal and groundnuts.

== Temples ==
There are several historical temples in Metpally.

- ISKCON Metpally, Hare Krishna Temple
- AYYAPA SWAMY TEMPLE INCLUDING HANUMAN TEMPLE BESIDE SRSP CANEL.
- Kashi bagh Temple complex including the Hanuman, Shiva and Dattatreya Swamy temples.
- Chenna Keshavaswamy temple dating back to the 13th century.
- Omkareshwara temple
- Narasimha Swami temple
- Ramalayam in SRSP camp
- Vasavi kanyaka parameshwari temple
- Abhayastha hanuman temple-Vellulla road
- Ayyappa swamy temple
- Markhandeya Temple
- Krishna Mandiram
- Sai Baba Temple-Near Railway Station
- Venkateshwara Temple-near Old Bustand
- Veera bramhamgari temple Dubbawada
- Gol Hanuman temple, Dubbawada
- Mahalaxmi temple near Vatti vaagu is the oldest & most believed temple by Metpally people.
- Bhudevi temple, located at Chavidi circle, is the 1st temple in Metpally.
- Tri Shakti Devalayam, besides ISKCON Hare Krishna Temple

=== HISTORY ===
Metpally is a town in Telangana, India, and the third largest in Jagtial district. Historically ruled by dynasties like the Sathavahanas and Kakatiyas—who built the Chennakesava temple—it's now an agricultural hub.

== Transport ==
Metpally town is connected with National Highway 63

=== Rail ===
Metpally has a railway station on the Peddapalli-Nizamabad line.

=== FAMOUS ===
The town is famous for its khadi textile industry and localized agricultural trading firms
