= Korutla =

Korutla కోరుట్ల Korutla
- Town
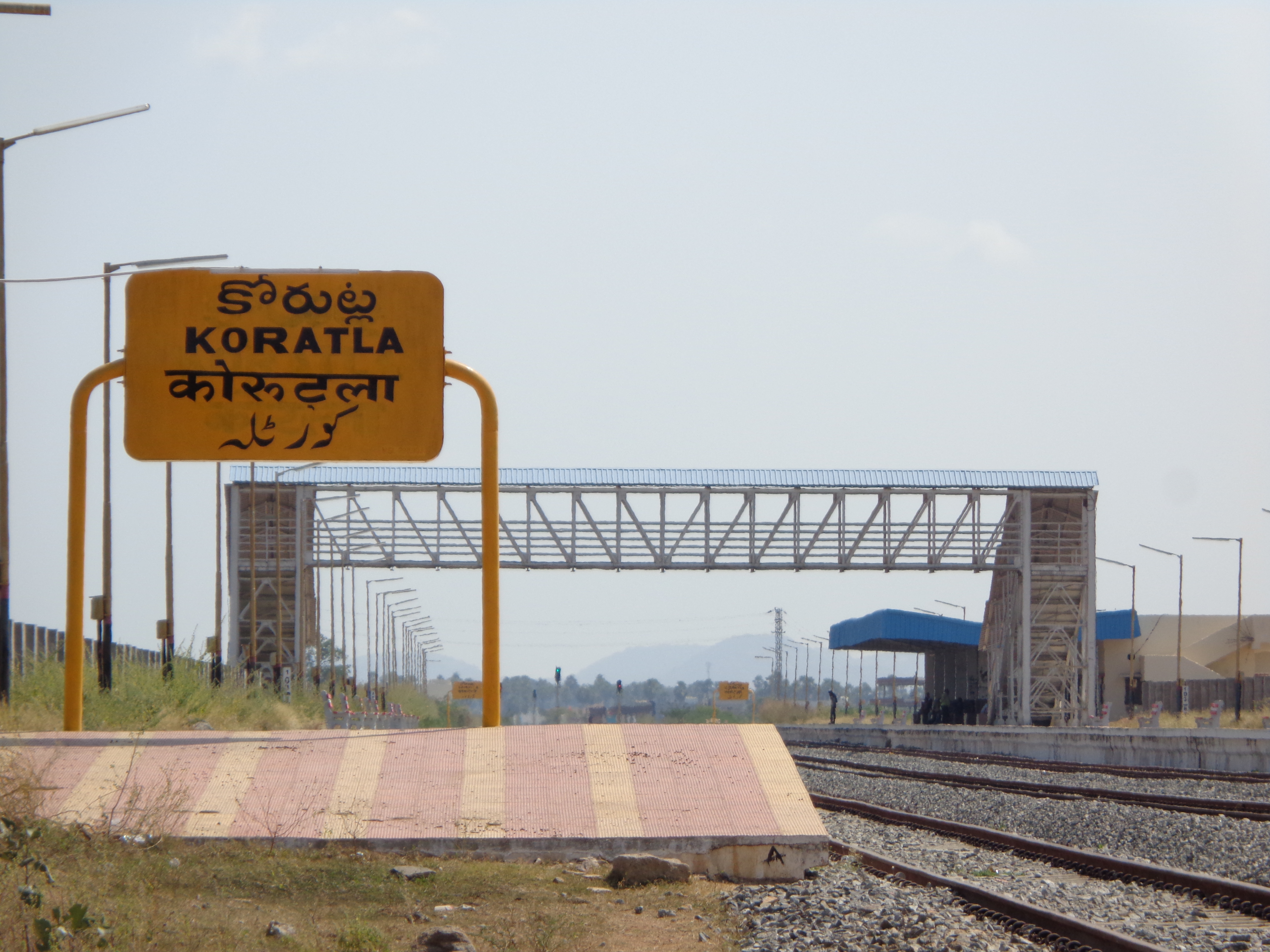
- Korutla Railway Station

- Location in Telangana, India Korutla (India)
- Coordinates: 18.8215°N 78.7119°E
- Country: India
- State: Telangana
- District: Jagtial
- Region: Deccan

Government
  - Type: Municipal Council
  - Body: Korutla Municipality

Area
  - Total: 34.12 km^{2} (13.17 sq mi)
  - Rank: 2
- Elevation: 287 m (942 ft)

Population (2018)
  - Total: 89,215
  - Density: 2,615/km^{2} (6,772/sq mi)

Languages
  - Official: Telugu
- Time zone: UTC+5:30 (IST)
- PIN: 505326
- Telephone code: 08725
- Vehicle registration: TS21
- Website: korutlamunicipality.telangana.gov.in

Korutla (also known as Koratla) is a town and revenue division in the Jagtial district in the Indian state of Telangana. It is a historical town ruled by Jain kings and second largest town in Jagtial district. It is the headquarters of Koratla constituency. It is located about 23 kilometres (14 mi) from the district headquarters Jagtial, 235 kilometers from Hyderabad, 73 kilometers from Karimnagar and 76 kilometers from Nizamabad.

== History ==
Korutla is used to be called with names such as Koravattu, Korapattu, Koravatlu, Koratlu, Kagithalapatla. In archeological evacuations, historians found epigraphy on stones (shilashasanam), written in 1042-1068 A.D was found in the holy pond (koneru or Korutla Stepwell) of Korutla. As per the writings and opinions of people here, Korutla has got thousands of years of history and was recorded as ancient Jain hub. More than a millennium ago it was ruled by great Jain kings, Kalyani Chalukyas (957-1184), Vemulawada Chalukyas (7th century to 10th century) and Rastrakutas.

In the era of Jain's it was called "Koravattu". As the days were passing, it changed to "Koravatlu", "Koratlu", and finally changed to present name Korutla. Another belief is that the Hindu sages, belong to the tribe of Koravattu, used to live here and performed their devotional activities and penances in this place. The two idols of Thirthankaras of Jainism were placed inside Shree Mahadevaswamy Temple dedicated to Lord Shiva which was built by Jain kings during their rule. An ancient katar (Push dagger) weapon was found in Shree Mahadevaswamy Temple which was used by one of the kings who ruled this place.

There are big and old constructions which are called as burujulu (ancient watch towers). They were built for the protection of the palace which is called as Gadi (గడి) in Telugu, which is located in the middle of six burujulu (watch towers). The palace was recently destroyed. Out of these six burujulu, one was destroyed but remaining five which can be seen. A big wall used to be there connecting all burjulu; it was wide enough that a car could go on it.

Along the wall, there used to be a canal with full of water for additional protection measures. For this reason that area is still called as "Kalvagadda or Kaluva Gadda". In the premises of the palace there is a holy pond (koneru or Korutla Stepwell), which is constructed with rock, under the ground, surrounding the holy pond and it was a construction with pillars and a dressing room.

== Temples ==
The 4 temples of Lord Shiva which were built during 10th century namely

- Shree Mahadevaswamy Temple
- Shree Nagareshwaraswamy Temple
- Shree Ramanathaswamy Temple
- Shree Rameshwara Temple

Other temples which are famous. They are

- Shree Astalakshmi Aadi Narayana Temple
- Shree Venkateshwara Temple
- Ayyappa Gutta Shree Gnana Saraswati Alaya Rahu Ketu Sahitha Shanaishwaralaya Shree Dharmashasta Ayyappa Temple
- Shree Venugopalaswamy Temple
- Shree Madvirat Potuluri Veerabrahmendra Swamy Temple
- Shree Peddamma Temple
- Trishakti Matha Temple
- Shree Koti Navadurga Shiva Markandeya Temple
- Shree Siddhi Vinayaka Temple
- Shree Hanuman Temple
- Shree Muthyala Pochamma Temple
- Shree Lakshmi Narasimha Swamy Temple
- Shree Seetha Ramalayam Temple
- Shree Durgadevi Temple

== Geography ==
Korutla Municipality covers an area of 34.12 square kilometers (13.17 square miles), at an elevation of 287 meters (942 ft).

== Demographics ==
Historical population
Year	Pop.	±%
1901	5,524	—
1911	6,068	+9.8%
1921	6,004	−1.1%
1931	6,996	+16.5%
1941	8,161	+16.7%
1951	8,874	+8.7%
1961	11,780	+32.7%
1971	17,701	+50.3%
1981	30,196	+70.6%
1991	40,080	+32.7%
2001	54,012	+34.8%
2011	66,504	+23.1%

As of 2011 Indian census, Korutla had an estimated population of 66,504. But, approximately in 2018, the population is 85,000. The gender split is 50% male, 50% female. The literacy rate is 60%—approximately equal to the national average of 59.5%. Male literacy is 69%, and female literacy is 51%. 14% of the population is under six years old.

== Transportation ==
It has a TSRTC bus stand. The buses travel to Hyderabad, Warangal, Karimnagar, Nizamabad, Tirupati, Pamur, Kanigiri, etc. National Highway 63 passes through this town.

=== Rail ===
Korutla Railway Station. The station code is [KRLA]. It has railway connectivity via the Peddapalli–Nizamabad line to Mumbai, Visakhapatnam, Delhi, and Chennai.

== Education ==
=== Colleges ===
- P.V. Narasimha Rao College of Veterinary Science
- Government Degree College, Korutla
- Government Boys Junior College, Korutla
- Government Girls Junior College, Korutla
- Government Polytechnic College, Korutla
- Rashmidhar Teja B.Ed & D.Ed College, Korutla
- Sri Arunodaya Degree College, Korutla
- Ramakrishna Degree College, Korutla
- Pothani Rajesh Babu Memorial Junior College, Korutla
- Maastro E-Techno Girls Junior College, Korutla
- Sri Chaitanya Junior College, Korutla

=== Schools ===
- Kerala English Medium High School (Korutla)
- Zilla Parishad Boys High School, Korutla
- Zilla Parishad Girls High School, Korutla
- Adarsha High School, Korutla
- Siddhartha High School, Korutla
- Akshara High School, Korutla
- Korutla Public School
- Little Flower High School, Korutla
- Sri Saraswathi Shishu Mandir, Korutla
- Gowtham Model School, Korutla
- SFS High School, Korutla

== Notable people ==
- Dharmapuri Arvind
- Thippiri Tirupathi

== Gallery ==
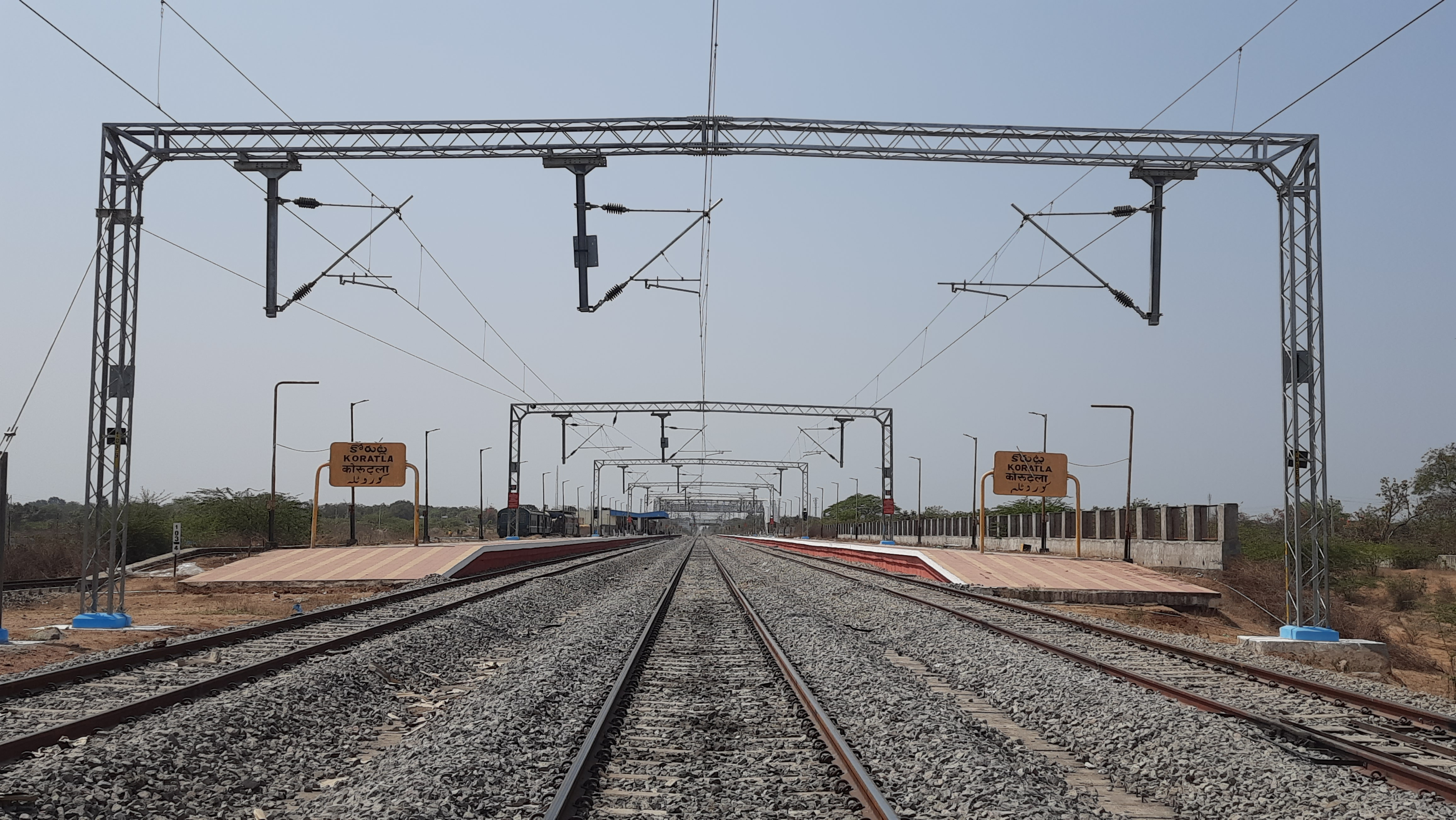
Koratla Railway Station

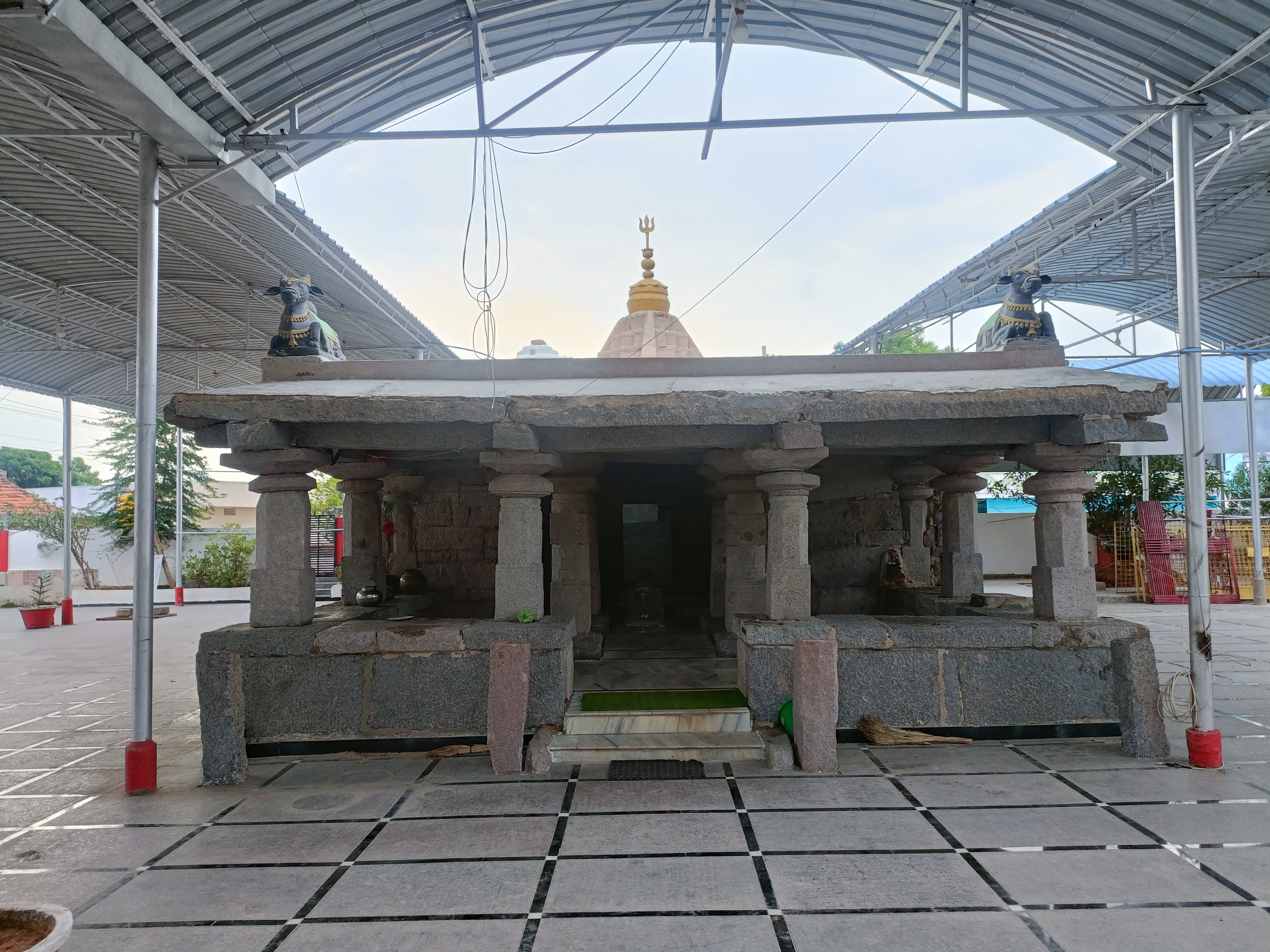
Shree Mahadevaswamy Temple

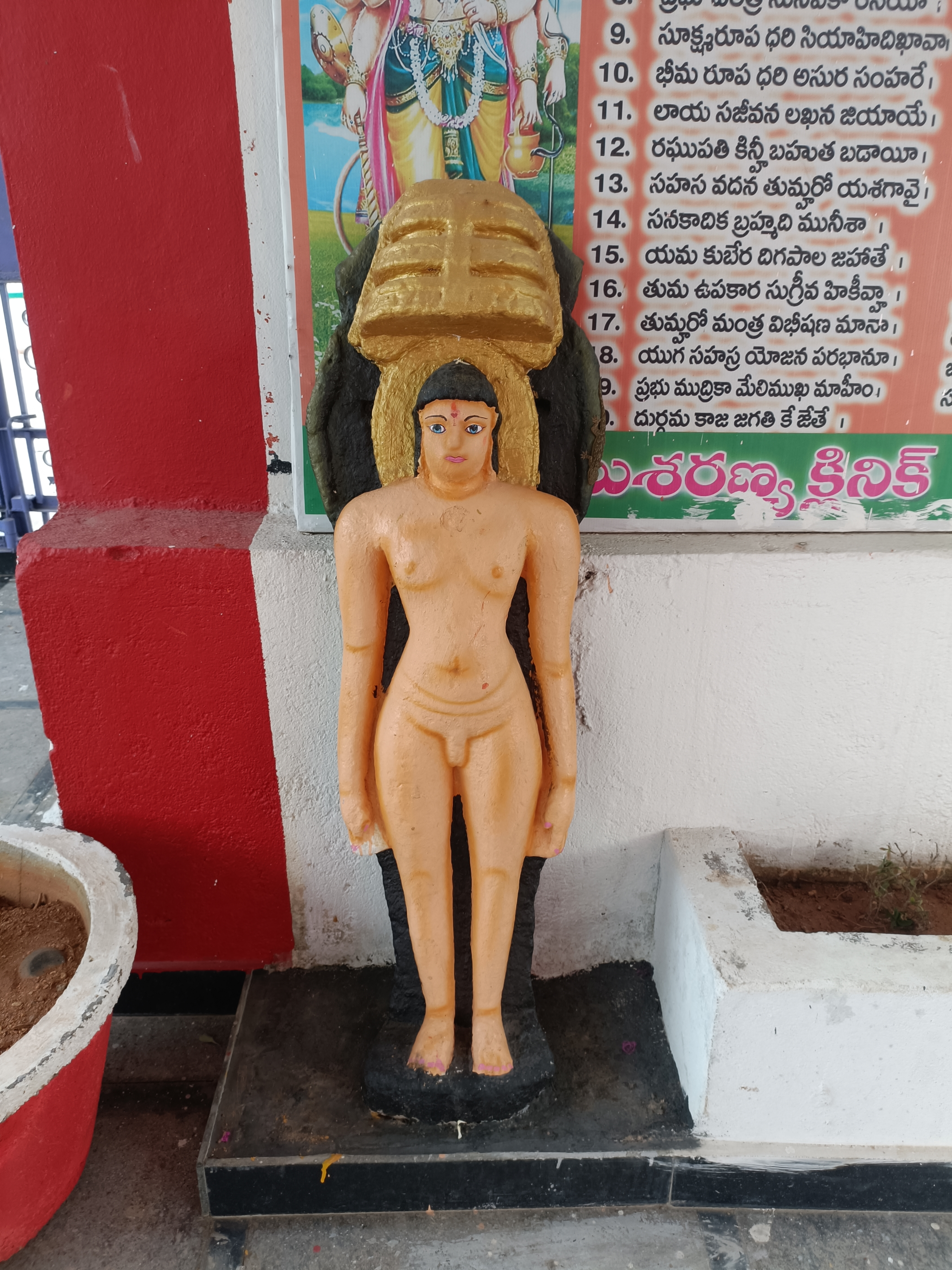
Idol of 1st Thirthankara Rishabhanatha inside Shree Mahadevaswamy Temple

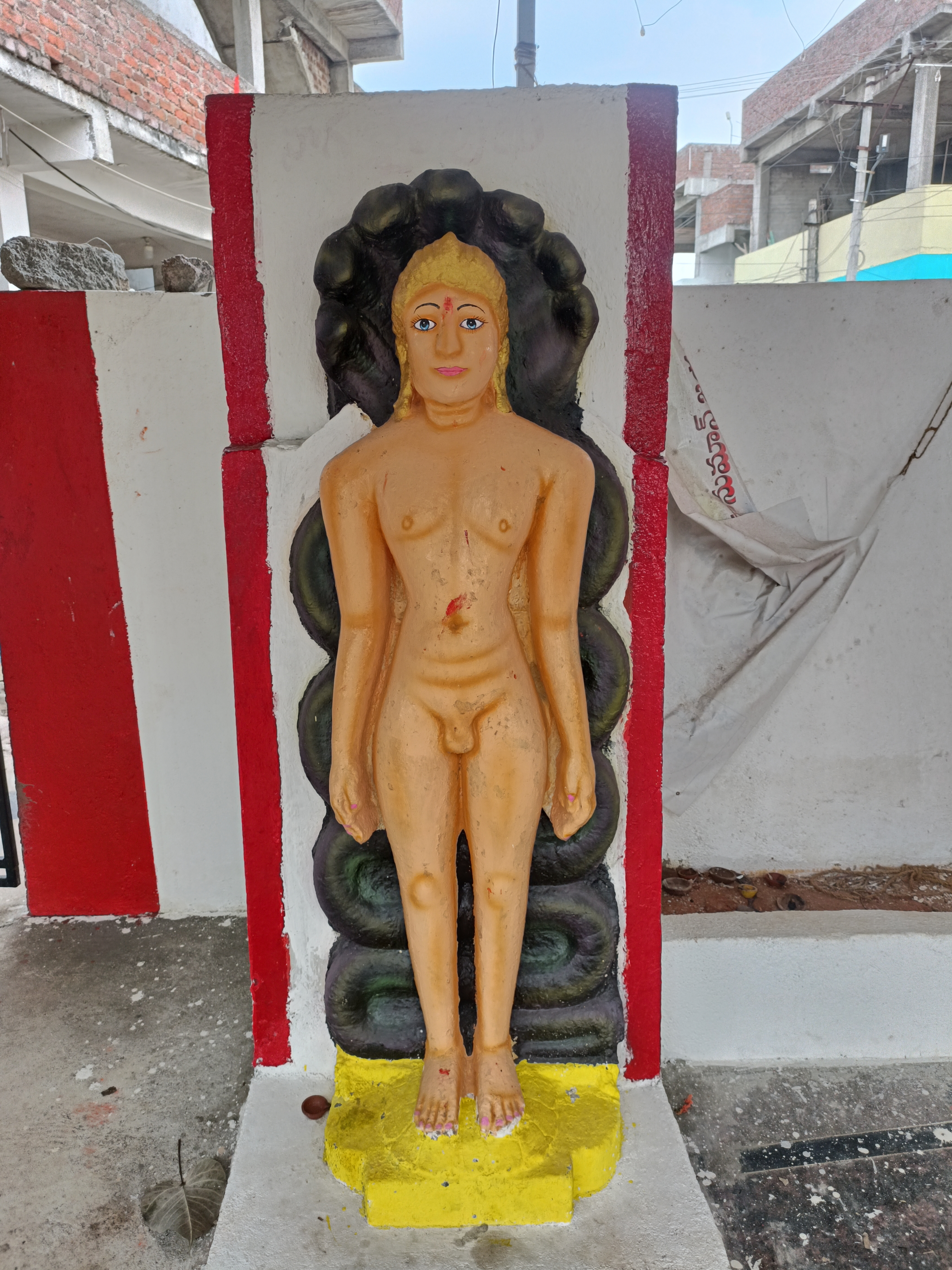
Idol of 23rd Thirthankara Parshvanath

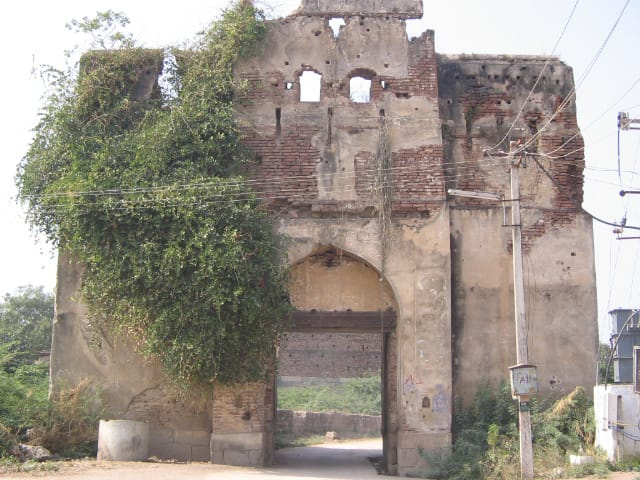
Korutla Buruju 1

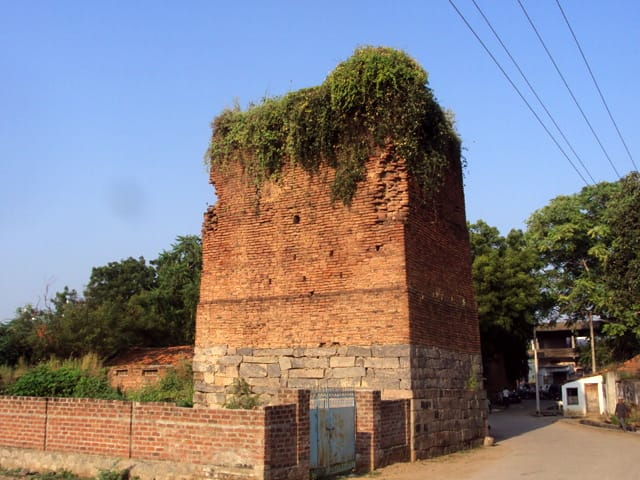
Korutla Buruju in ruining stage

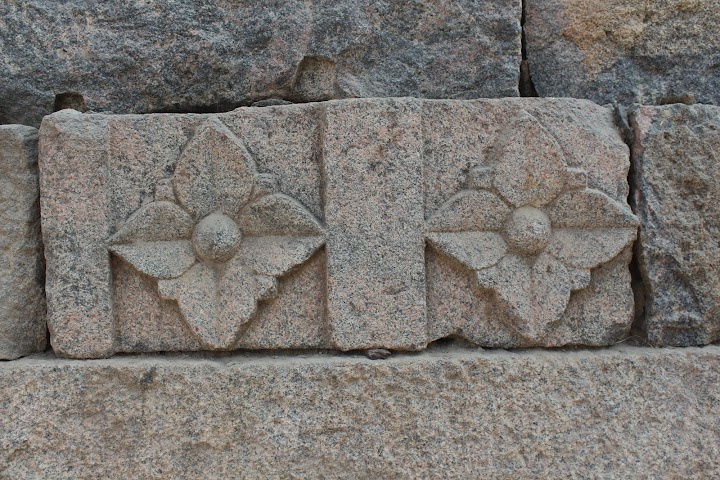
Flowers carving on the walls of one of the Burujulu

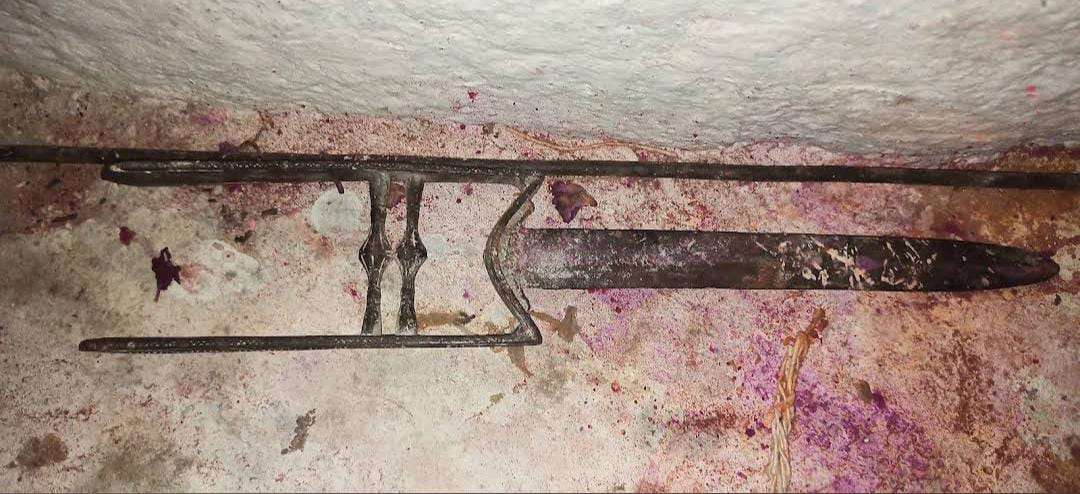
A katar (push dagger) weapon was found in Korutla's Shree Mahadevaswamy Temple
