= Mallapur mandal =

Mallapur
- Mandal
- Location in Telangana, India Mallapur (India)
- Coordinates: 18.970°N 78.705°E
- Country: India
- State: Telangana
- District: Jagtial
- Region: Deccan

Government
  - Type: Nagara Panchayathi
  - MLA: Kalvakuntla Vidyasagar Rao (TRS)
  - MP: Kalvakuntla Kavitha

Population (2011)
  - Total: 53,870
  - Rank: 6th Rank in Dist

Languages
  - Official: Telugu & Urdu
- Time zone: UTC+5:30 (IST)
- PIN: 505331
- Vehicle registration: TS-21
- Website: telangana.gov.in

Mallapur is a mandal in the Jagtial district of the Indian state of Telangana.

== Demographics ==
As of 2011 census, Mallapur mndal had 53,870 inhabitants, with 26,080 males and 27,790 females.
