= Sarangapur, Jagtial district =

Sarangapur
- Village
- Location in Telangana, India Sarangapur (India)
- Coordinates: 18°56′41″N 78°59′37″E
- Country: India
- State: Telangana
- District: Jagtial
- Elevation: 322 m (1,056 ft)

Population (2011)
  - Total: 122,368

Languages
  - Official: Telugu
- Time zone: UTC+5:30 (IST)
- PIN: 505529
- Vehicle registration: TS
- Website: telangana.gov.in

Sarangapur is a village Sarangapur mandal in Jagtial district of the Indian state of Telangana. Before reorganisation of districts in Telanaga in 2016, Sarangapur mandal was a part of Karimnagar district.
