= Velgatoor =

- Village
- Location in Telangana, India Velgatoor (India)
- Coordinates: 18.844°N 79.173°E
- Country: India
- State: Telangana
- District: Jagtial
- Talukas: Velgatoor

Languages
  - Official: Telugu
- Time zone: UTC+5:30 (IST)
- PIN: 505526
- Telephone code: 08728
- Vehicle registration: TS 21
- Website: telangana.gov.in

Velgatoor is a Town and mandal headquarter of Velgatoor mandal in Jagtial district in the state of Telangana in India.

== Demographics ==
According to 2011 Census, demographics of the village are:

- Total population: 4,463
- Males population: 2,248
- Female population: 2,215
- Number of households: 1,218
- Literacy rate: 60.19%
