= Dharmapuri, Telangana =

Dharmapuri
- Town
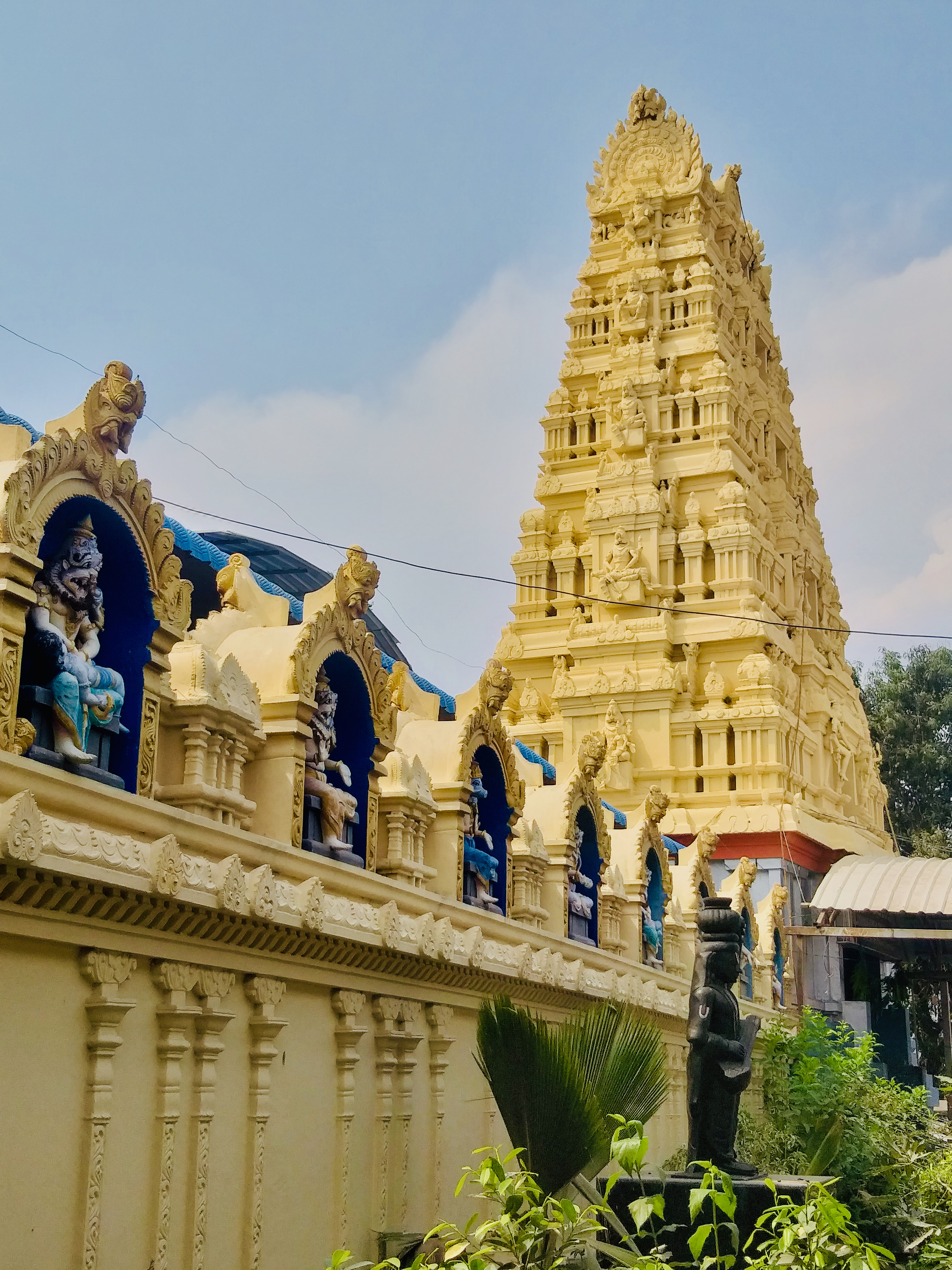
- Lord Narsimha Swamy and Devi Lakshmi

- Location in Telangana, India Dharmapuri (India)
- Coordinates: 18.9475°N 79.094°E
- Country: India
- State: Telangana
- District: Jagtial
- Named for: Dharmapuri Laxmi Narsimha Swamy

Government
  - Type: Municipal council
  - Body: Municipality

Area
  - Total: 15.23 km^{2} (5.88 sq mi)
  - Rank: 4rth in District

Population (2018)
  - Total: 18,882
  - Density: 1,240/km^{2} (3,211/sq mi)

Languages
  - Official: Telugu
- Time zone: UTC+5:30 (IST)
- PIN: 505 425
- Vehicle registration: TG
- Nearest city: Jagtial
- Website: telangana.gov.in

Dharmapuri is a municipality and the mandal headquarters of Dharmapuri mandal in Jagtial district of Telangana, India.

== Geography ==
Dharmapuri is situated at a distance of about 28–30 km from Jagityal town railway station and 42 km from Mancherial town on the Kazipet–Balharshah section of the South Central Railway on the Bank of River Godavari. This river flows West to East except in Dharmapuri where it flows North to South hence the river is termed as Dakshina Vahini (South Flowing).

== Tourism ==
Lakshmi Narasimha Temple is located in Dharmapuri Town. It is the abode of Narsimha Swamy, the fourth avatar of Vishnu, and his consort Devi Lakshmi. The place has garnered considerable crowd over the years. The temple was built during the reign of the Chalukyas, and later expanded by the Kakatiyas.
