= Jagtial district =

- District of Telangana
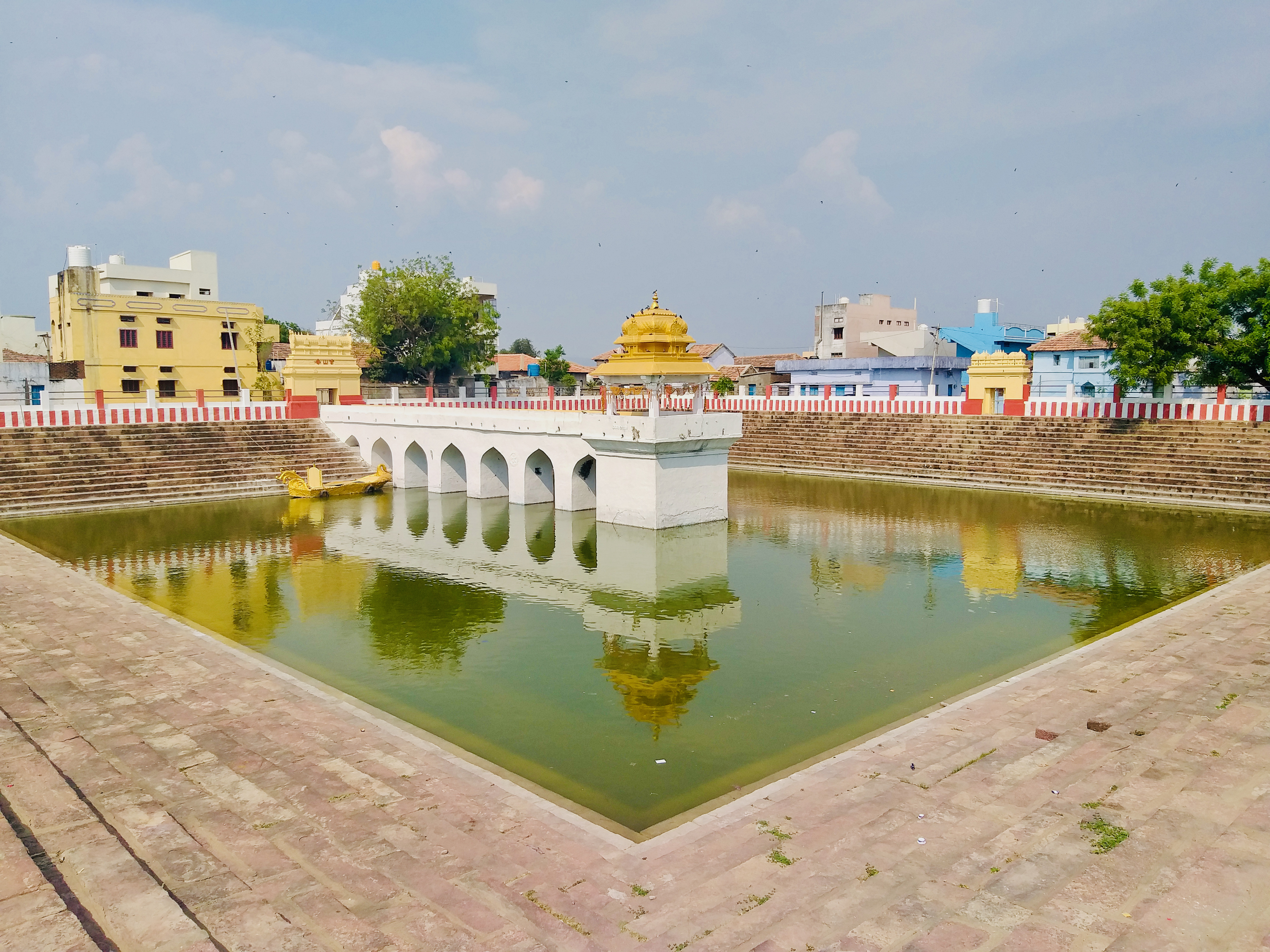
- Lakshmi Narasimha Swami temple, Dharmapuri
- Interactive map of Jagtial district
- Coordinates (Jagtial): 18.7°N 78.9°E
- Country: India
- State: Telangana
- Headquarters: Jagtial
- Mandalas: 18

Government
  - District Collector: Shaik Yasmeen Basha
  - Parliament constituencies: Nizamabad
  - Assembly constituencies: Jagtial, Korutla, Dharmapuri

Area
  - Total: 2,419.00 km^{2} (933.98 sq mi)

Population (2011)
  - Total: 988,913
  - Density: 408.811/km^{2} (1,058.81/sq mi)
- Time zone: UTC+05:30 (IST)
- Vehicle registration: TG 21
- Website: jagtial.telangana.gov.in

Jagtial district is a district located in the northern region of the Indian state of Telangana. Its administrative headquarters is the city of Jagtial. The district shares boundaries with Nirmal, Mancherial, Karimnagar, Peddapalli, Sircilla and Nizamabad districts.

== Geography ==
The district is spread over an area of 2,419.00 square kilometres (933.98 sq mi). Jagtial district shares it boundaries with Nirmal district and Mancherial district on North and North East respectively, it is bounded on South and South West by Karimnagar district and Peddapalli district respectively and on the West by Nizamabad district

== Demographics ==
Religions in Jagtial district (2011)
Religion	Percent
Hinduism	91.55%
Islam	7.80%
Christianity	0.45%
Other or not stated	0.20%
Distribution of religions

As of 2011 Census of India, the district has a population of 985,417, of which 221,336 (22.46%) live in urban areas. Jagtial district has a sex ratio of 1036 females per 1000 males and a literacy rate of 60.26%. 93,272 (9.47%) were under 10 years of age. Scheduled Castes and Scheduled Tribes comprised 164,596 (16.70%) and 23,351 (2.37%) of the population, respectively.

Languages of Jagtial district (2011)
1. Telugu (90.9%)
2. Urdu (7.17%)
3. Lambadi (0.91%)
4. Others (1.02%)

At the 2011 census, 90.90% of the population spoke Telugu, 7.17% Urdu and 0.91% Lambadi as their first language.

== Administrative divisions ==
Logo of the Jagtial Police. Jagtial Police is the agency responsible for enforcing law & order throughout the district

The district has three revenue divisions of Jagtial, Korutla and Metpally, which are sub-divided into 18 mandals.

=== Mandals ===
The table below categorizes the district's mandals into their respective revenue divisions.

Sr No.	Jagital revenue division	Korutla revenue division	Metpalli revenue division
1	Jagtial	Korutla	Metpalli
2	Jagtial Rural	Medipalle	Mallapur
3	Raikal	Kathlapur	Ibrahimpatnam
4	Sarangapur	Bheemaram	
5	Beerpur		
6	Dharmapuri		
7	Buggaram		
8	Pegadapalli		
9	Gollapalli		
10	Mallial		
11	Kodimial		
12	Velgatoor		
13	Endapalli		

== Notable people ==
- Duvvasi Mohan, actor and comedian in Telugu cinema
- Venu Sriram, film director in Tollywood
- Harish Shankar, film director in Tollywood
- Alishetty Prabhakar, writer and painter
- T. Jeevan Reddy, politician, MLC, ex R&B minister
- L. Ramana, politician from TRS Party, MLC
- Vamshi Paidipally, film director in Tollywood

== National Highways ==
NH563 Jagtial - Karimnagar - Warangal - Khammam

NH63 Latur- Nizamabad - Jagtial - Mancherial - Bijapur Jagdalpur

NH61 Bhiwandi - Ahmadnagar - Nanded - Nirmal - Jagtial

== See also ==
- List of districts in Telangana
