= List of members of the Telangana Legislative Council =

The Telangana Legislative Council, (also known as Telangana Śāsana Mandali) is the upper house of the bicameral legislature of Telangana state in south eastern India.

== Members of Telangana Legislative Council ==
This is a list of current and past members of the Telangana Legislative Council. The state elects members for a term of 6 years. 14 members are indirectly elected by the state legislators, 14 members are elected by Local Authorities, 3 from Graduates constituencies and 3 from teachers constituencies. The Governor of Telangana nominates up to 6 eminent people as members from various fields.

- Star (*) represents current members
- MLA - elected by Members of Telangana Legislative Assembly
- LA - Local Authorities
- GR - Graduates
- TR - Teachers
- NOM - Nominated

Name	Party	Constituency	Term start	Term end	Notes
C. Anji Reddy*	BJP	Medak–Nizamabad–Adilabad–Karimnagar GR	30-Mar-2025	29-Mar-2031	
Malka Komaraiah*	BJP	Medak-Nizamabad-Adilabad-Karimnagar TR	30-Mar-2025	29-Mar-2031	
P. Sripal Reddy	Ind	Warangal-Khammam-Nalgonda TR	30-Mar-2025	29-Mar-2031	
Vijayashanti	INC	MLA's	30-Mar-2025	29-Mar-2031	
Addanki Dayakar	INC	MLA's	30-Mar-2025	29-Mar-2031	
Kethavath Shankar Naik	INC	MLA's	30-Mar-2025	29-Mar-2031	
Nellikanti Satyam	CPI	MLA's	30-Mar-2025	29-Mar-2031	
Dasoju Sravan Kumar	BRS	MLA's	30-Mar-2025	29-Mar-2031	
Teenmar Mallanna	INC	Warangal–Khammam–Nalgonda GR	7-Jun-2024	29-Mar-2027	bye - resignation of Palla Rajeshwar Reddy
Naveen Kumar Reddy	BRS	Mahabubnagar LA	2-Jun-2024	04-Jan-2028	bye - resignation of Kasireddy Narayan Reddy
Mahesh Kumar Goud	INC	MLA's	22-Jan-2024	21-Nov-2027	bye - resignation of Kadiyam Srihari
Balmoor Venkat	INC	MLA's	22-Jan-2024	21-Nov-2027	bye - resignation of Kaushik Reddy
Mirza Rahmat Baig	AIMIM	Hyderabad LA	2-May-2023	1-May-2029	
A. Venkata Narayana Reddy*	BJP	Mahabubnagar-Rangareddy-Hyderabad TR	30-Mar-2023	29-Mar-2029	
Deshapati Srinivas	BRS	MLA's	30-Mar-2023	29-Mar-2029	
Challa Venkatrami Reddy	BRS	MLA's	30-Mar-2023	29-Mar-2029	
Kurumaiahgari Naveen Kumar	BRS	MLA's	30-Mar-2023	29-Mar-2029	
Dande Vittal	BRS	Adilabad LA	05-Jan-2022	04-Jan-2028	defected to INC
K. Kavitha	BRS	Nizamabad LA	05-Jan-2022	04-Jan-2028	
L. Ramana	BRS	Karimnagar LA	05-Jan-2022	04-Jan-2028	
T. Bhanu Prasad Rao	BRS	Karimnagar LA	05-Jan-2022	04-Jan-2028	defected to INC
Vanteri Yadav Reddy	BRS	Medak LA	05-Jan-2022	04-Jan-2028	
Patnam Mahender Reddy	BRS	Ranga Reddy LA	05-Jan-2022	04-Jan-2028	defeccted to INC
Shambipur Raju	BRS	Ranga Reddy LA	05-Jan-2022	04-Jan-2028	
Kasireddy Narayan Reddy	BRS	Mahabubnagar LA	05-Jan-2022	8-Dec-2023	elected to Kalwakurthy Assembly
Kuchukulla Damodar Reddy	BRS	Mahabubnagar LA	05-Jan-2022	04-Jan-2028	defeccted to INC
Mankena Koti Reddy	BRS	Nalgonda LA	05-Jan-2022	04-Jan-2028	
Pochampally Srinivas Reddy	BRS	Warangal LA	05-Jan-2022	04-Jan-2028	
Tata Madhusudhan	BRS	Khammam LA	05-Jan-2022	04-Jan-2028	
Kadiyam Srihari	BRS	MLA's	22-Nov-2021	9-Dec-2023	elected to Ghanpur Station Assembly
Gutha Sukender Reddy	BRS	MLA's	22-Nov-2021	21-Nov-2027	
Banda Prakash	BRS	MLA's	22-Nov-2021	21-Nov-2027	
Kaushik Reddy	BRS	MLA's	22-Nov-2021	9-Dec-2023	elected to Huzurabad Assembly
Thakkalapally Ravinder Rao	BRS	MLA's	22-Nov-2021	21-Nov-2027	
P Venkata Rami Reddy	BRS	MLA's	22-Nov-2021	21-Nov-2027	
Surabhi Vani Devi	BRS	Mahbubnagar–Ranga Reddy–Hyderabad GR	30-Mar-2021	29-Mar-2027	
Palla Rajeshwar Reddy	BRS	Warangal–Khammam–Nalgonda GR	30-Mar-2021	9-Dec-2023	elected to Jangaon Assembly
K. Kavitha	BRS	Nizamabad LA	12-Oct-2020	4-Jan-2022	bye - disq of Bhoopati Reddy
Pochampally Srinivas Reddy	BRS	Warangal LA	3-Jun-2019	4-Jan-2022	bye -res of Konda Muralidhar Rao
Patnam Mahender Reddy	BRS	Ranga Reddy LA	3-Jun-2019	4-Jan-2022	bye - res of Patnam Narender Reddy
Tera Chinnapa Reddy	BRS	Nalgonda LA	3-Jun-2019	4-Jan-2022	bye - res of Komatireddy Raj Gopal Reddy
Kurumaiahgari Naveen Kumar	BRS	MLA's	28-May-2019	29-Mar-2023	bye - res of M Hanumantha Rao
M.S. Prabhakar Rao	BRS	Hyderabad LA	2-May-2019	2-May-2025	defected to INC
Mahmood Ali	BRS	MLA's	30-Mar-2019	29-Mar-2025	
Satyavathi Rathod	BRS	MLA's	30-Mar-2019	29-Mar-2025	
Seri Subash Reddy	BRS	MLA's	30-Mar-2019	29-Mar-2025	
Mallesham Yegge	BRS	MLA's	30-Mar-2019	29-Mar-2025	defected to INC
Mirza Riyaz Ul Effendi	AIMIM	MLA's	30-Mar-2019	29-Mar-2025	
T. Jeevan Reddy	INC	Medak–Nizamabad–Adilabad–Karimnagar GR	30-Mar-2019	29-Mar-2025	
Alugubelli Narsi Reddy	Ind	Warangal-Khammam-Nalgonda TR	30-Mar-2019	29-Mar-2025	
Kura Raghotharn Reddy	Ind	Medak-Nizamabad-Adilabad-Karimnagar TR	30-Mar-2019	29-Mar-2025	
Syed Aminul Hasan Jafri	AIMIM	Hyderabad LA	2-May-2017	1-May-2023	
Vullolla Gangadhar Goud	BRS	MLA's	30-Mar-2017	29-Mar-2023	
Mynampally Hanumanth Rao	BRS	MLA's	30-Mar-2017	11-Dec-2018	elected to Malkajgiri Assembly
Alimineti Krishna Reddy	BRS	MLA's	30-Mar-2017	29-Mar-2023	
Katepally Janardhan Reddy	Ind	Mahabubnagar-Rangareddy-Hyderabad TR	30-Mar-2017	29-Mar-2023	
Gutha Sukender Reddy	BRS	MLA's	19-Aug-2019	3-Jun-2021	bye - disq of K. Yadava Reddy
Mohammed Fareeduddin	BRS	MLA's	7-Oct-2016	3-Jun-2021	bye - res of T Nageswara Rao
Puranam Satish Kumar	BRS	Adilabad LA	5-Jan-2016	4-Jan-2022	
R Bhoopati Reddy	BRS	Nizamabad LA	5-Jan-2016	4-Jan-2022	disqualified on 16-Jan-2019
T. Bhanu Prasad Rao	BRS	Karimnagar LA	5-Jan-2016	4-Jan-2022	
Naradasu Laxman Rao	BRS	Karimnagar LA	5-Jan-2016	4-Jan-2022	
V. Bhoopal Reddy	BRS	Medak LA	5-Jan-2016	4-Jan-2022	
Sunkari Raju	BRS	Ranga Reddy LA	5-Jan-2016	4-Jan-2022	
Patnam Narender Reddy	BRS	Ranga Reddy LA	5-Jan-2016	11-Dec-2018	elected to Kodangal Assembly
Kasireddy Narayan Reddy	BRS	Mahabubnagar LA	5-Jan-2016	4-Jan-2022	
Kuchukulla Damoder Reddy	INC	Mahabubnagar LA	5-Jan-2016	4-Jan-2022	
Komatireddy Raj Gopal Reddy	INC	Nalgonda LA	5-Jan-2016	17-Dec-2018	elected to Munugode Assembly
Konda Murali	BRS	Warangal LA	5-Jan-2016	22-Dec-2018	resigned
Balasani Laxminarayana	BRS	Khammam LA	5-Jan-2016	4-Jan-2022	
Kadiyam Srihari	BRS	MLA's	4-Jun-2015	3-Jun-2021	
K. Yadava Reddy	BRS	MLA's	4-Jun-2015	16-Jan-2019	disqualified
Nethi Vidya Sagar	BRS	MLA's	4-Jun-2015	3-Jun-2021	
Bodakunti Venkateswarlu	BRS	MLA's	4-Jun-2015	3-Jun-2021	
Thummala Nageswara Rao	BRS	MLA's	4-Jun-2015	23-May-2016	elected to Palair Assembly
Akula Lalitha	INC	MLA's	4-Jun-2015	24-Dec-2018	defected to BRS
N. Ramchander Rao	BJP	Mahbubnagar–Ranga Reddy–Hyderabad GR	30-Mar-2015	29-Mar-2021	
Palla Rajeshwar Reddy	BRS	Warangal–Khammam–Nalgonda GR	30-Mar-2015	29-Mar-2021	
