= Chairperson of the Telangana Legislative Council =

Presiding officer of the upper house of the Telangana Legislature of India

Chairperson of Telangana Legislative Council
- Telaṅgāṇa Śāsana Maṇḍali Chairpersonn
- Incumbent; Gutha Sukender Reddy since 14 March 2022
- Appointer: Members of the Telangana Legislative Council
- Term length: Subject to the pleasure of the Legislative Council (Six years maximum)
- Inaugural holder: Gutha Sukender Reddy
- Formation: 2 June 2014; 12 years ago
- Deputy: Deputy Chairperson of the Legislative Council

The Chairperson of Telangana Legislative Council presides over the upper house of the Telangana Legislature. The chairperson regulates the debates and proceedings of the House. The chairperson is elected internally by the Telangana Legislative Council.

== List of chairpersons ==
The Telangana Legislative Council is headed by a chairperson, elected by members in a simple majority vote. The following is the list of chairpersons of the council.

| # | Portrait | Name | Constituency | Tenure | | | Party |
| # | Portrait | Name | Constituency | Term start | Term end | Term | Party |
|---|---|---|---|---|---|---|---|
| 1 | | Nethi Vidya Sagar | Nalgonda LA | 9 June 2014 | 2 July 2014 | 23 days | Telangana Rashtra Samithi |
| 2 | | Kanakamamidi Swamy Goud | Medak–Nizamabad–Adilabad–Karimnagar GR | 2 July 2014 | 29 March 2019 | 4 years, 270 days | Telangana Rashtra Samithi |
| 3 | | Gutha Sukender Reddy | Elected By MLAs | 11 September 2019 | 3 June 2021 | 1 year, 265 days | Telangana Rashtra Samithi |
Vacant
| (3) | | Gutha Sukender Reddy | Elected By MLAs | 14 March 2022 | Incumbent | 4 years, 251 days | Bharat Rashtra Samithi |

== List of deputy chairpersons ==
The following is the list of deputy chairpersons of the council.

| # | Portrait | Name | Constituency | Tenure | | | Party |
| # | Portrait | Name | Constituency | Term start | Term end | Term | Party |
|---|---|---|---|---|---|---|---|
| 1 | | Nethi Vidya Sagar | Nalgonda LA | 2 June 2014 | 8 June 2014 | 6 days | Telangana Rashtra Samithi |
| 1 | | Nethi Vidya Sagar | Nalgonda LA | 2 July 2014 | 1 May 2015 | 303 days | Telangana Rashtra Samithi |
| 1 | | Nethi Vidya Sagar | Elected By MLAs | 6 October 2015 | 3 June 2021 | 5 years, 240 days | Telangana Rashtra Samithi |
Vacant
| 2 | | Banda Prakash | Elected By MLAs | 12 February 2023 | Incumbent | 3 years, 281 days | Bharat Rashtra Samithi |
