= Telangana Legislative Council =

Upper house of the bicameral legislature of the state of Telangana in India

Telangana Legislative Council Telaṅgāṇa Śāsana Maṇḍali

Type
- Type: Upper house of the Telangana Legislature
- Term limits: 6 years

History
- Founded: 2 June 2014 (12 years ago)

Leadership
- Governor: Shiv Pratap Shukla since 11 March 2026
- Secretary: Dr. V. Narasimha Charyulu since 1 September 2017
- Chairman: Gutha Sukender Reddy, INC since 14 March 2022
- Deputy Chairman: Banda Prakash, BRS since 12 February 2023
- Leader of the House (Chief Minister): Anumula Revanth Reddy, INC since 07 December 2023
- Minister of Legislative Affairs: D. Sridhar Babu, INC since 07 December 2023
- Leader of the Opposition: S. Madhusudhana Chary, BRS since 11 September 2024

Structure
- Seats: 40 (34 Elected + 6 Nominated)
- Political groups: Government (15) INDIA (15): INC (13); CPI (1); TJS (1); Official Opposition (17): BRS (17); Other Opposition (7): BJP (3); AIMIM (2); PRTU (1); Independent (1); Vacant (1) Vacant (1)

Elections
- Voting system: Single transferable vote
- Last election: January 2024

Meeting place
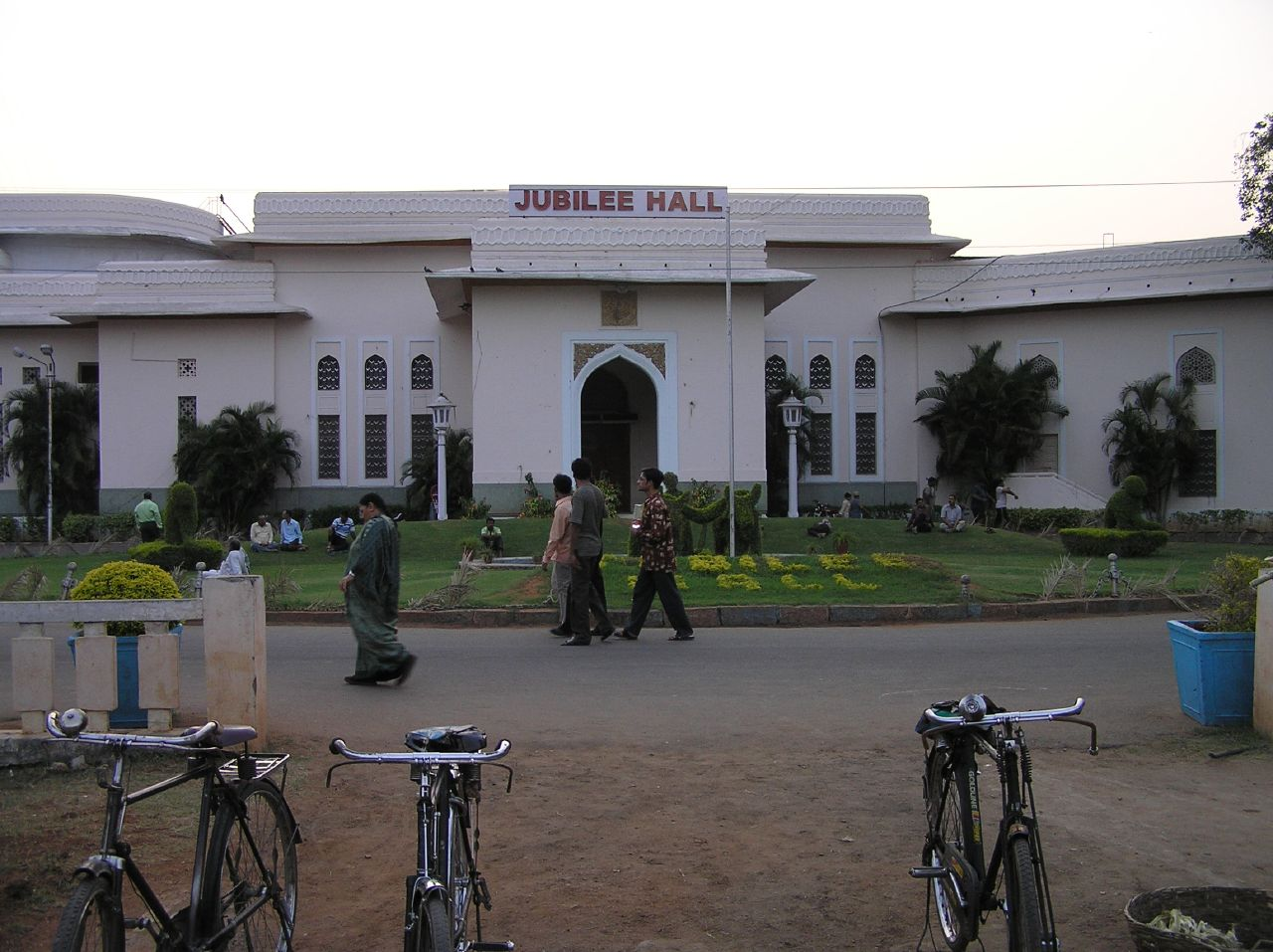
- Jubilee Hall, Hyderabad

Website
- Telangana Legislative Council

The Telangana Legislative Council, also known as Telangana Śāsana Mandali, is the upper house of the Telangana Legislature of the Indian state of Telangana; the lower house being the Telangana Legislative Assembly. It is situated in the state capital of Hyderabad, and has 40 members. The Legislative Council has been in existence since 2 June 2014 after bifurcation from the state of Andhra Pradesh.

== Composition ==
The chairman, elected by the council, presides over the sessions of the council. The deputy chairman is also elected to preside in the chairman's absence.

=== Presiding officers ===
Designation	Name
Governor	Shiv Pratap Shukla
Chair	Gutha Sukender Reddy (INC)
Deputy Chair	Banda Prakash (BRS)
Leader of the House (Chief Minister)	Revanth Reddy (INC)
Leader of the Opposition	S. Madhusudhana Chary (BRS)

=== Members ===
Party	Members
Bharat Rashtra Samithi	17
Indian National Congress	12
Bharatiya Janata Party	3
All India Majlis-e-Ittehadul Muslimeen	2
Communist Party of India	1
Progressive Recognized Teachers Union	1
Telangana Jana Samithi	1
Independent	1
Vacant	1
Total	40

== Current members ==
=== Elected by Members of the Legislative Assembly (14) ===
Keys: BRS (7) INC (6) CPI (1)

#	Member	Party	Term start	Term end
1	Dasoju Sravan Kumar	BRS	30-Mar-2025	29-Mar-2031
2	Challa Venkatrami Reddy	BRS	30-Mar-2023	29-Mar-2029
3	Kurumaiahgari Naveen Kumar	BRS	30-Mar-2023	29-Mar-2029
4	Deshapathi Srinivas	BRS	30-Mar-2023	29-Mar-2029
5	Banda Prakash	BRS	22-Nov-2021	21-Nov-2027
6	Parupati Venkatrama Reddy	BRS	22-Nov-2021	21-Nov-2027
7	Thakkellapally Ravindar Rao	BRS	22-Nov-2021	21-Nov-2027
8	Gutha Sukender Reddy	INC	22-Nov-2021	21-Nov-2027
9	Vijaya Shanthi Moturi	INC	30-Mar-2025	29-Mar-2031
10	Addanki Dayakar	INC	30-Mar-2025	29-Mar-2031
11	Kethavath Shankar Naik	INC	30-Mar-2025	29-Mar-2031
12	Bomma Mahesh Kumar Goud	INC	23-Jan-2024	21-Nov-2027
13	Balmoor Venkat Narsing Rao	INC	23-Jan-2024	21-Nov-2027
14	Nellikanti Satyam	CPI	30-Mar-2025	29-Mar-2031

=== Elected from Local Authorities Constituencies (14) ===
Keys: BRS (7) INC (4) AIMIM (2)

#	Constituency	Member	Party	Term start	Term end
1	Adilabad	Dande Vittal	INC	05-Jan-2022	04-Jan-2028
2	Karimnagar	T. Bhanu Prasad Rao	INC	05-Jan-2022	04-Jan-2028
3	Karimnagar	L. Ramana	BRS	05-Jan-2022	04-Jan-2028
4	Medak	Vanteri Yadav Reddy	BRS	05-Jan-2022	04-Jan-2028
5	Ranga Reddy	Sunkari Raju	BRS	05-Jan-2022	04-Jan-2028
6	Mahbubnagar	Naveen Kumar Reddy	BRS	02-Jun-2024	04-Jan-2028
7	Mahbubnagar	Kuchukulla Damodar Reddy	INC	05-Jan-2022	04-Jan-2028
8	Khammam	Tata Madhusudhan	BRS	05-Jan-2022	04-Jan-2028
9	Warangal	Pochampally Srinivas Reddy	BRS	05-Jan-2022	04-Jan-2028
10	Nalgonda	Mankena Koti Reddy	BRS	05-Jan-2022	04-Jan-2028
11	Ranga Reddy	P. Mahender Reddy	INC	05-Jan-2022	04-Jan-2028
12	Hyderabad	Mirza Riyaz Ul Hassan Effendi	AIMIM	02-May-2025	01-May-2031
13	Nizamabad	Vacant since 6 January 2026			
14	Hyderabad	Mirza Rahmat Baig	AIMIM	02-May-2023	01-May-2029

=== Elected from Graduates constituencies (3) ===
Keys: BJP (1) IND (1) BRS (1)

#	Constituency	Member	Party	Term start	Term end
1	Warangal–Khammam–Nalgonda	Teenmar Mallanna	Independent	7-Jun-2024	29-Mar-2027
2	Mahbubnagar–Ranga Reddy–Hyderabad	Surabhi Vani Devi	BRS	30-Mar-2021	29-Mar-2027
3	Medak–Nizamabad–Adilabad–Karimnagar	Chinnamile Anji Reddy	BJP	30-Mar-2025	29-Mar-2031

=== Elected from Teachers constituencies (3) ===
Keys: BJP (2) PRTU (1)

#	Constituency	Member	Party	Term start	Term end
1	Warangal–Khammam–Nalgonda	Pingili Sripal Reddy	PRTU	30-Mar-2025	29-Mar-2031
2	Medak–Nizamabad–Adilabad–Karimnagar	Malka Komaraiah	BJP	30-Mar-2025	29-Mar-2031
3	Mahbubnagar–Ranga Reddy–Hyderabad	A. Venkata Narayana Reddy	BJP	30-Mar-2023	29-Mar-2029

=== Nominated by Governor (6) ===
Keys: INC (3) BRS (2) TJS (1)

#	Member	Party	Term start	Term end
1	Mohammad Azharuddin	INC	26-Apr-2026	25-Apr-2032
2	Boggarapu Dayanand	INC	15-Nov-2020	14-Nov-2026
3	Basavaraju Saraiah	INC	15-Nov-2020	14-Nov-2026
4	S. Madhusudhana Chary	BRS	14-Dec-2021	13-Dec-2027
5	Goreti Venkanna	BRS	15-Nov-2020	14-Nov-2026
6	M. Kodandaram	TJS	26-Apr-2026	25-Apr-2032

== Former Members from 2007 ==
BRS (17) TDP (8) INC (23) BJP (1) CPI (2) IND (5)

#	Member	Party
1.	Thelukutla Gopala Venkata Krishna Reddy	INC
2.	Paturi Sudhakar Reddy	BRS
3.	V. Bhoopal Reddy	INC
4.	S. Jagadeeswar Reddy	INC
5.	Nethi Vidya Sagar	INC
6.	Potla Nageswara Rao	TDP
7.	Arikela Narsa Reddy	TDP
8.	Patil Venugopal Reddy	INC
9.	Naradasu Laxman Rao	BRS
10.	Konda Muralidhar Rao	INC
11.	S. Indrasain Reddy	INC
12.	K. B. Naranayappa	INC
13.	Poola Ravindar	IND
14.	Ponguleti Sudhakar Reddy	INC
15.	Peer Shabbir Ahmed	INC
16.	Patnam Narender Reddy	TDP
17.	P. Yadagiri	TDP
18.	Nagapuri Rajalingam	INC
19.	Mohd. Ali Shabbir	INC
20.	Mohammed Saleem	TDP
21.	M.S.Prabhakar Rao	INC
22.	K.Premsagar Rao	INC
23.	K.Yadava Reddy	INC
24.	K.Swamy Goud	BRS
25.	K.R. Amos	INC
26.	Ibrahim Bin Abdullah Masquati	TDP
27.	K. Nageshwar	IND
28.	Kapilavai Dileep Kumar	BRS
29.	Chukka Ramaiah	IND
30.	Cherupally Seetha Ramulu	CPI(M)
31.	Bodakunti Venkateswarlu	TDP
32.	Bharathi Dhiravat	INC
33.	Balasani Laxminarayana	TDP
34.	B. Mohan Reddy	IND
35.	P.J.C. Shekara Raoy	CPI
36.	N. Ramchander Rao	BJP
37.	Puranam Satish Kumar	BRS
38.	Komatireddy Raj Gopal Reddy	INC
39.	Thummala Nageswara Rao	BRS
40.	Rekulapally Bhoopathi Reddy	BRS
41.	Tera Chinnapa Reddy	BRS
42.	Kancharla Bhupal Reddy	BRS
43.	Nayani Narasimha Reddy	BRS
44.	Yegge Mallesham	BRS
45.	K. Naveen Rao	BRS
47.	Ramulu Naik	BRS
48.	Akula Lalitha	INC
49.	Mynampally Hanumanth Rao	BRS
50.	T. Santhosh Kumar	INC
51.	Karne Prabhakar	BRS
52.	Anumula Revanth Reddy	IND
53.	Mallu Bhatti Vikramarka	INC
54.	Palla Rajeshwar Reddy	BRS
55.	Padi Kaushik Reddy	BRS
56.	Kasireddy Narayan Reddy	BRS
57.	Kadiyam Srihari	BRS
57.	M. Srinivas Reddy	BRS
58.	Kura Raghotham Reddy	PRTU
59.	M. S. Prabhakar Rao	INC

== See also ==
- List of members of the Telangana Legislative Council
