= Mohan Reddy =

Mohan Reddy may refer to:

- B. Mohan Reddy, Indian politician and Member of Legislative Council
- Silpa Mohan Reddy, Indian politician, legislator and Member of Legislative Assembly
- V. Mohan Reddy, Indian academic
- B. V. R. Mohan Reddy, Indian businessman and founder of Cyient
- Y. S. Jagan Mohan Reddy, Indian politician, chief minister of Andhra Pradesh
