= Rythu Bandhu scheme =

Indian government welfare programme

- Type of project: Farmer Investment support
- Location: Telangana, India
- Founder: Government of Telangana
- Established: 10 May 2018
- Budget: ₹14,800 crore (FY 2021-22)

Rythu Bandhu scheme, also known as Farmer's Investment Support Scheme (FISS), is a welfare program to support farmer's investment for two crops a year by the Government of Telangana. The government is providing 58.33 lakh (5.8 million) farmers ₹5000 per acre per season to support the farm investment, twice a year, for rabi (winter) and kharif (rainy) seasons. This is a first direct farmer investment support scheme in India, where the cash is paid directly.

== History ==
The scheme was announced by the Former Chief Minister of Telangana, K. Chandrashekhar Rao at Farmers Coordination Committee (Rythu Samanvaya Samithi) conference at Jayashankar Agriculture University on 25 February 2018. An allocation of ₹12,000 crores was made in 2018-19 state budget. It was launched on 10 May 2018.

== The scheme ==
The scheme offers a financial help of ₹10,000 per year to each farmer (two crops). There is no cap on the number of acres, and most of the farmers are small and marginal. The total farming land is 1.43 crore acres and the number of farmers in the state stood at 58.33 lakh. Around 55% of population in Telangana make a living from agriculture.

The agriculture land holdings are:

Land Extent	No. of farmers	Total Acres	Est.Cost	
under 1 acre	18 lakhs	18 lakhs	14.4 billion	30.8%
under 1-2 acres	24 lakhs	48 lakhs	38.4 billion	41.9%
under 3-5 acres	11 lakhs	44 lakhs (avg)	35.2 billion	18.8%
5-10 acres	4.4 lakhs	33 lakhs (avg)	26.4 billion	7.5%
> 10 acres	94,000	9.4 lakhs	7.52 billion	1.6%
> 25 acres	6488	1.62 lakhs	1.3 billion	0.1%
> 50 acres	298	14900	119 million	0.005%

=== Land ceiling & Tenancy ===
As per AP Land Ceiling Act 1976, any person cannot hold more than 51 acres agriculture land and 21 acres dryland. Tenant farmers were excluded from the scheme to prevent legal disputes arising out of tenancy (Hyderabad Tenancy and Agricultural Lands Act, 1950). To prevent legal disputes, the tenancy column was removed from the newly issued Pattadar Passbook.

=== Give it Up! Option ===
The Chief Minister was the first farmer to forgo the support called as, Give it up!, given by the government and appealed to all rich farmers to do the same. The farmers who forgo the support, the money goes to the corpus of Rythu Samanvaya Samithi corpus.

=== Distribution ===
The money is given to the farmers through a bank bearer cheque. Along with the cheque, the government also gives the Pattadar Passbook, the title deed after an exercise to purify the land records was done by the government. The new passbook is highly secure with 17 tamper-proof security features, and a land bank website, Dharani, to have all land holdings in the state.

== Misuse ==
The scheme pays all land owners regardless of their personal income and wealth. Much of the opposition to the scheme is directed towards payments to rich land owners. Many wealthy individuals including government officials, doctors and businessmen own large tracts of farmlands. Contrary to the scheme's intention all such individuals are paid the scheme benefits. According to the government's estimates, about ₹3.19 billion is paid annually to farmers who own more than 20 acres. This estimate does not take into consideration the practice of splitting the land between members of the same family in order to show smaller land holdings. In addition, the scheme only pays the land owners and not the tillers.

== Annadatha Sukhibhava ==
Annadatha Sukhibhava (అన్నదాత సుఖీభవ ) is a welfare programme started by Andhra Pradesh Government to provide ₹15,000 investment support to small and marginal farmer's family per annum which includes ₹6000 Central Government Pradhan Mantri Kisan Samman Nidhi share. The government is providing support to nearly 70 lakh farmers including tenant farmers. This farmer investment support scheme where the cash is paid directly into the Aadhaar linked bank accounts will cover all the farmers in the state on Family as unit basis without any conditions. It was formally started on 19-02-2019 by providing ₹1000 Initially by RTGS Center.

== MIT study ==
MIT's Abdul Latif Jameel Poverty Action Lab (J-PAL), a poverty alleviation institute. It is conducting the study for randomly selected sample and is using High-frequency monitoring in-Person Phone Survey and IVR based survey on the effectiveness of the scheme.
