= T-Fiber =

Program to provide high speed Internet

- Type of project: Internet connectivity to 23 million people
- Location: Telangana, India
- Founder: Government of Telangana
- Chief Minister: Anumula Revanth Reddy
- Ministry: Ministry of Information Technology
- Established: 12 March 2015
- Status: Active
- Website: Official website

Telangana Fiber Grid or T-Fiber is a flagship program by Government of Telangana to provide high speed Internet across the state. It was expected to be completed by end of 2019. The project will help connect 23 million people with government to government, government to citizens services and the range of other applications.

== History ==
It started in 2017 with pilot project started in Maheshwaram Mandal in Rangareddy district by IT minister, K. T. Rama Rao. It provides internet access to improve health and education by bringing telemedicine and educational opportunities to more people in rural areas.

== The project ==
The project is accomplished by laying 62,000 miles of fiber-optic cable in more than 22,000 villages. The fiber optic line along with drinking water project, Mission Bhagiratha. The large black pipe is for water and a blue pipe has fiber optic cable.
