= List of current Indian legislative speakers and chairpersons =

Presiding officer of the legislative assembly in India

Speaker of the Legislative Assembly
- State legislative assemblies of India
- Style: Honourable (Inside India); His/Her Excellency (Outside India)
- Member of: State legislative assembly
- Appointer: Members of Legislative Assembly
- Term length: During the life of the Assembly
- Constituting instrument: Article 178 of the Constitution of India
- Deputy: Deputy Speaker of the Legislative Assembly
- Salary: ₹370,000 (US$4,000) (incl. allowances) per month

The Speaker of the Legislative Assembly is the presiding authority and highest authority of state legislative assemblies in India for carrying house proceedings. He is empowered to determine the status of a bill submitted to the house by the state legislators. Elected by the members of assembly, this post is held by two politicians for two identical roles such as "speaker" and "deputy speaker" for assembly session proceedings. In case one fails to attend the session due to some uncertainties such as resignation, illness or death, deputy speaker acts as a presiding officer until a new speaker is elected.

It is created under the Article 178 of the Constitution of India. The Indian constitution also allows all states and union territories for the appointment of a speaker. The two members are elected at anytime after the state election is declared. In Indian political system, the time frame for the election of a speaker and deputy speaker is determined by the state legislators independently. The election date for the post of speaker is decided by the state governor while deputy speaker election date is specified by speaker.

== Role ==
A speaker is responsible for presiding assembly debates and maintains order and discipline of the house during legislative session. He decides "when a member should be called upon to speak and how long he be allowed to speak". Questions relating breach of privilege and contempt of the house is raised by the members with consent of the Speaker or the Deputy Speaker.

With regard to matters within the assembly house or related to the members of the legislative assembly, it is the right of the Speaker to interpret the constitution and rules. The prime responsibility of the speaker is to maintain discipline and order in the house by practicing disciplinary privileges granted by the constitution of India.

In the Republic of India, the various central and state legislatures are presided by either a Chairperson or a Speaker. A speaker is the presiding officer of the Lok Sabha and of the legislative assembly of each of the twenty-eight states and three union territories. Similarly a chairperson heads the Rajya Sabha and the legislative council of each of the six states, where the upper house in the state legislature exists. Seventeen incumbents belong to the Bharatiya Janata Party and three to the Indian National Congress, No other party has more than one in office.

== Parliament of India ==
This is the list of current Chairpersons and Speakers of both houses of the Parliament of India (respectively):

=== Lok Sabha ===
House	Speaker	Party	Deputy Speaker	Party
Lok Sabha	Om Birla	BJP	Vacant	N/A

=== Rajya Sabha ===
House	Chairperson (Note: Vice President of India is the ex-officio Chairperson of the Rajya Sabha.)	Party	Deputy Chairperson	Party
Rajya Sabha	C. P. Radhakrishnan	BJP	Harivansh Narayan Singh	IND

== Legislatures of the States and Union territories ==
=== State Legislative Councils ===
This is the list of current Chairpersons and Deputy Chairpersons of the legislative councils of the Indian states:

State	Chairperson	Party	Deputy Chairperson	Party
Andhra Pradesh	Koyye Moshenu Raju	YSRCP	Zakia Khanam	BJP
Bihar	Awadhesh Narain Singh	BJP	Ram Bachan Rai	JD(U)
Karnataka	Basavaraj Horatti	BJP	M. K. Pranesh	BJP
Maharashtra	Ram Shinde	BJP	Neelam Gorhe	SS
Telangana	Gutha Sukender Reddy	BRS	Banda Prakash	BRS
Uttar Pradesh	Kunwar Manvendra Singh	BJP	Vacant	N/A

=== State Legislative Assemblies ===
This is the list of current Speakers and Deputy Speakers of the legislative assemblies of the Indian states and union territories:

States	Speaker	Party	Deputy Speaker	Party
Andhra Pradesh	Chintakayala Ayyanna Patrudu	TDP	Raghu Rama Krishna Raju	TDP
Arunachal Pradesh	Tesam Pongte	BJP	Kardo Nyigyor	BJP
Assam	Ranjeet Kumar Dass	BJP	Habbey Teron	BJP
Bihar	Dr. Prem Kumar	BJP	Narendra Narayan Yadav	JD(U)
Chhattisgarh	Raman Singh	BJP	Vacant	N/A
Goa	Ganesh Gaonkar	BJP	Joshua D'Souza	BJP
Gujarat	Shankar Chaudhary	BJP	Jethabhai Ahir	BJP
Haryana	Harvinder Kalyan	BJP	Krishan Lal Middha	BJP
Himachal Pradesh	Kuldeep Singh Pathania	INC	Vacant	N/A
Jharkhand	Rabindra Nath Mahato	JMM	Vacant	N/A
Karnataka	U. T. Khader	INC	Rudrappa Manappa Lamani	INC
Keralam	Thiruvanchoor Radhakrishnan	INC	Shanimol Osman	INC
Madhya Pradesh	Narendra Singh Tomar	BJP	Vacant	N/A
Maharashtra	Rahul Narwekar	BJP	Anna Bansode	NCP
Manipur	Thokchom Satyabrata Singh	BJP	Kongkham Robindro Singh	BJP
Meghalaya	Thomas A. Sangma	NPP	Limison D. Sangma	NPP
Mizoram	Lalbiakzama	ZPM	Lalfamkima	ZPM
Nagaland	Sharingain Longkümer	NPF	S. Toiho Yeptho	NPF
Odisha	Surama Padhy	BJP	Bhabani Shankar Bhoi	BJP
Punjab	Kultar Singh Sandhwan	AAP	Jai Krishan Singh	AAP
Rajasthan	Vasudev Devnani	BJP	Vacant	N/A
Sikkim	Mingma Narbu Sherpa	SKM	Raj Kumari Thapa	SKM
Tamil Nadu	J. C. D. Prabhakar	TVK	M. Ravisankar	TVK
Telangana	Gaddam Prasad Kumar	INC	Jatoth Ram Chander Naik	INC
Tripura	Ram Pada Jamatia	BJP	Ram Prasad Paul	BJP
Uttarakhand	Ritu Khanduri Bhushan	BJP	Vacant	N/A
Uttar Pradesh	Satish Mahana	BJP	Vacant	N/A
West Bengal	Rathindra Bose	BJP	Vacant	N/A

Union Territories	Speaker	Party	Deputy Speaker	Party
Jammu and Kashmir	Abdul Rahim Rather	JKNC	Vacant	N/A
Delhi	Vijendra Gupta	BJP	Mohan Singh Bisht	BJP
Puducherry	TBA	BJP	TBD	AINRC

== See also ==
- Governor (India)
- Chief minister (India)
- Chief Whip (India)
- List of current Indian chief justices
- List of current Indian opposition leaders
- List of female legislative speakers and chairpersons in India
- List of speakers of the Lok Sabha
- List of deputy speakers of the Lok Sabha
- List of chairpersons of the Rajya Sabha
- List of deputy chairmans of the Rajya Sabha
