= Government of Telangana =

Indian State Government

- Emblem of Telangana
- Formation: 2 June 2014; 12 years ago (Telangana Day)
- Country: India
- Website: www.telangana.gov.in
- Seat of government: Hyderabad, Telangana

Legislative Branch
- Legislature: Telangana Legislature
- Upper House: Telaṅgāṇa Sāsana Mandali
- Chairperson of the House: Gutha Sukender Reddy (BRS)
- Deputy Chairperson of the House: Banda Prakash (BRS)
- Leader of the House: Anumula Revanth Reddy (INC)
- Deputy Leader of the House: TBD (INC)
- Leader of the Opposition: K Chandrasekhar Rao (BRS)
- Deputy Leader of the Opposition: TBD (BRS)
- Members in Council: 40
- Lower House: Telaṅgāṇa Śāsana Sabha
- Speaker of the House: Gaddam Prasad Kumar (INC)
- Deputy Speaker of the House: TBD (INC)
- Leader of the House: Anumula Revanth Reddy (INC) (Chief Minister)
- Deputy Leader of the House: Mallu Bhatti Vikramarka (INC)
- Leader of the Opposition: BRS (BRS)
- Deputy Leader of the Opposition: BRS (BRS)
- Members in Śāsana Sabha: 119
- Meeting place: Assembly Building, Hyderabad Telangana

Executive Branch
- Governor (Head of the State): Shiv Pratap Shukla (Governor of Telangana)
- Chief Minister (Head of Government): Anumula Revanth Reddy, (INC) (Chief Minister of Telangana)
- Deputy Chief Minister (Deputy Head of Government): Mallu Bhatti Vikramarka (INC) (Deputy Chief Minister Telangana)
- Chief Secretary (Head of Civil Service): Kudligi Ramakrishna Rao (IAS) (Chief Secretary Telangana)
- State Cabinet: Telangana Council of Ministers
- Meeting place: Telangana Secretariat
- Ministry (Government Department): NA
- Total no. of Minister members: (Chief Minister 01); (Dy Chief Minister 01); (Cabinet Minister 10); (Minister of State 00); Total = 12
- Responsible for this: Telaṅgāṇa Śāsana Sabha

Judiciary branch
- High Court: Telangana High Court
- Chief Justice: Aparesh Kumar Singh

The Government of Telangana is the governing authority of the state of Telangana in India. It consists of an executive, a judiciary and a legislative.

The state government is headed by the Governor of Telangana as the nominal head of state, with a democratically elected Chief Minister as the real head of the executive. The governor who is appointed for five years appoints the chief minister and his council of ministers. Even though the governor remains the ceremonial head of the state, the day-to-day running of the government is taken care of by the chief minister and his council of ministers in whom a great deal of legislative powers are vested. The state government maintains its capital at Hyderabad and is seated at the Government Secretariat or the Sachivalayam.

The Government of Telangana was formed on 2 June 2014 after bifurcation of Andhra Pradesh as part of Andhra Pradesh Reorganisation Act, 2014.

== Head leaders ==
House	Leader	Portrait	Since
Constitutional posts
Governor	Jishnu Dev Varma		27 July 2024
Chief Minister	Anumula Revanth Reddy		7 December 2023
Deputy Chief Minister	Mallu Bhatti Vikramarka		7 December 2023
Chairperson	Gutha Sukender Reddy		16 November 2021
Speaker Telaṅgāṇa Sāsana Sabha	Gaddam Prasad Kumar		7 December 2023
Deputy Chairperson Telaṅgāṇa Sāsana Mandali	Banda Prakash		12 February 2023
Deputy Speaker Telaṅgāṇa Śāsana Sabha	Vacant		7 December 2023
Leader of the House Telaṅgāṇa Śāsana Sabha	Anumula Revanth Reddy		7 December 2023
Leader of the House Telaṅgāṇa Sāsana Mandali	Anumula Revanth Reddy		7 December 2023
Leader of the Opposition Telaṅgāṇa Śāsana Sabha	K. Chandrashekar Rao		7 December 2023
Leader of Opposition Telaṅgāṇa Sāsana Mandali	S. Madhusudhana Chary		11 September 2024
Chief Justice Telangana High Court	Aparesh Kumar Singh		23 July 2023
Chief Secretary	K. Ramakrishna Rao, IAS		30 April 2025

== Council of Ministers ==
As per the Constitution of India, all portfolios of state government is vested in Chief Minister, who distribute various portfolio to individual ministers whom he nominates to the State Governor. The state governor appoints individual ministers for various portfolios and departments as per advice of Chief Minister and together form the State Cabinet. As the original portfolios are vested with CM, who delegates to others upon his/her wish, actions of individual ministers are part of collective responsibility of the state cabinet and Chief Minister is responsible for actions of each minister. The state cabinet along with Chief Minister, prepares General policy and individual department policy, which will be guiding policy for day-to-day administration of each minister.

=== Current Cabinet ===
This is the current Cabinet of Telangana headed by the Chief Minister of Telangana, Revanth Reddy:

Portfolio	Minister	Constituency	Tenure		Party
Portfolio	Minister	Constituency	Took office	Left office	Party
Chief Minister
Municipal Administration and Urban Development; General Administration; Law & Order.; Other departments not allocated to any Minister	Anumula Revanth Reddy	Kodangal	07 December 2023	Incumbent	INC
Deputy Chief Minister
Finance & Planning; Energy	Mallu Bhatti Vikramarka	Madhira (SC)	07 December 2023	Incumbent	INC
Cabinet Ministers
Irrigation & Command Area Development; Food & Civil Supplies	Nalamada Uttam Kumar Reddy	Huzurnagar	07 December 2023	Incumbent	INC
Transport; Backward Classes Welfare	Ponnam Prabhakar	Husnabad	07 December 2023	Incumbent	INC
Roads & Buildings.; Cinematography.	Komatireddy Venkat Reddy	Nalgonda	07 December 2023	Incumbent	INC
Environment & Forests.; Endowment.	Konda Surekha	Warangal East	07 December 2023	Incumbent	INC
Panchayat Raj & Rural Development (including Rural Water Supply).; Women & Child Development.	Dansari Anasuya Seethakka	Mulug (ST)	07 December 2023	Incumbent	INC
Information Technology.; Electronics & Communications.; Industries & Commerce.; Legislative Affairs.	Duddilla Sridhar Babu	Manthani	07 December 2023	Incumbent	INC
Revenue and Housing.; Information & Public Relations.	Ponguleti Srinivasa Reddy	Palair	07 December 2023	Incumbent	INC
Agriculture.; Marketing.; Co-operation.; Handlooms & Textiles.	Thummala Nageswara Rao	Khammam	07 December 2023	Incumbent	INC
Health.; Medical & Family Welfare.; Science and Technology.	Cilarapu Damodar Raja Narasimha	Andole (SC)	07 December 2023	Incumbent	INC
Prohibition & Excise.; Tourism & Culture.; Archaeology.	Jupally Krishna Rao	Kollapur	07 December 2023	Incumbent	INC
Labour, Employment, Training & Factories; Mines & Geology	Gaddam Vivekanand	Chennur (SC)	08 June 2025	Incumbent	INC
Scheduled Castes Development; Tribal Welfare; Empowerment of Persons with Disabilities, Senior Citizens, and Transgender Persons	Adluri Laxman Kumar	Dharmapuri (SC)	08 June 2025	Incumbent	INC
Animal Husbandry, Dairy Development & Fisheries; Sports & Youth Services	Vakiti Srihari	Makthal	08 June 2025	Incumbent	INC
Public Enterprises; Minorities Welfare	Mohammad Azharuddin	Provisional (Note: Appointed as minister subject to election as a MLA or MLC within six months)	31 October 2025	Incumbent	INC

== District Guardian Ministers ==
Sr No.	District	Guardian_Minister	Party	Tenure	
01	Adilabad	TBD	Indian National Congress	3 December 2023	Incumbent
02	Komaram Bheem Asifabad	TBD	Indian National Congress	3 December 2023	Incumbent
03	Mancherial	TBD	Indian National Congress	3 December 2023	Incumbent
04	Nirmal	TBD	Indian National Congress	3 December 2023	Incumbent
05	Nizamabad	TBD	Indian National Congress	3 December 2023	Incumbent
06	Jagtial	TBD	Indian National Congress	3 December 2023	Incumbent
07	Peddapalli	TBD	Indian National Congress	3 December 2023	Incumbent
08	Kamareddy	TBD	Indian National Congress	3 December 2023	Incumbent
09	Rajanna Sircilla	TBD	Indian National Congress	3 December 2023	Incumbent
10	Karimnagar	TBD	Indian National Congress	3 December 2023	Incumbent
11	Jayashankar Bhupalpally	TBD	Indian National Congress	3 December 2023	Incumbent
12	Sangareddy	TBD	Indian National Congress	3 December 2023	Incumbent
13	Medak	TBD	Indian National Congress	3 December 2023	Incumbent
14	Siddipet	TBD	Indian National Congress	3 December 2023	Incumbent
15	Jangaon	TBD	Indian National Congress	3 December 2023	Incumbent
16	Hanamkonda	TBD	Indian National Congress	3 December 2023	Incumbent
17	Warangal	TBD	Indian National Congress	3 December 2023	Incumbent
18	Mulugu	TBD	Indian National Congress	3 December 2023	Incumbent
19	Bhadradri Kothagudem	TBD	Indian National Congress	3 December 2023	Incumbent
20	Khammam	TBD	Indian National Congress	3 December 2023	Incumbent
21	Mahabubabad	TBD	Indian National Congress	3 December 2023	Incumbent
22	Suryapet	TBD	Indian National Congress	3 December 2023	Incumbent
23	Nalgonda	TBD	Indian National Congress	3 December 2023	Incumbent
24	Yadadri Bhuvanagiri	TBD	Indian National Congress	3 December 2023	Incumbent
25	Medchal-Malkajgiri	TBD	Indian National Congress	3 December 2023	Incumbent
26	Hyderabad	TBD	Indian National Congress	3 December 2023	Incumbent
27	Ranga Reddy	TBD	Indian National Congress	3 December 2023	Incumbent
28	Vikarabad	TBD	Indian National Congress	3 December 2023	Incumbent
29	Narayanpet	TBD	Indian National Congress	3 December 2023	Incumbent
30	Mahabubnagar	TBD	Indian National Congress	3 December 2023	Incumbent
31	Nagarkurnool	TBD	Indian National Congress	3 December 2023	Incumbent
32	Wanaparthy	TBD	Indian National Congress	3 December 2023	Incumbent
33	Jogulamba Gadwal	TBD	Indian National Congress	3 December 2023	Incumbent

== Government and Administration ==
=== Structure ===
The Governor is the constitutional head and the Chief Minister is head of the government who also heads the council of ministers. The Chief Justice of the high court is the head of the judiciary.

=== Governor ===
The governor is appointed by the President for a term of five years. The executive and legislative powers lie with the Chief Minister and his council of ministers, who are appointed by the governor. The governors of the states and territories of India have similar powers and functions at the state level as that of the President of India at Union level. Only Indian citizens above 36 years of age are eligible for appointment. Governors discharge all constitutional functions such as the appointment of the Chief Minister, sending reports to the president about failure of constitutional machinery in a state, or with respect to issues relating to the assent to a bill passed by legislature, exercise or their own opinion.

Ekkadu Srinivasan Lakshmi Narasimhan was the governor from 2 June 2014 to 1 September 2019.

Tamilisai Soundararajan was appointed as the governor on September 1, 2019.

The governor enjoys many different types of powers:

- Executive powers: related to administration, appointments, and removals
- Legislative powers: related to lawmaking and the state legislature
- Discretionary powers: to be carried out according to the discretion of the governor

=== Legislature ===
The legislature comprises the governor and the legislative assembly, which is the highest political organ in the state. All members of the legislative assembly are directly elected

The current assembly consists of 119 elected members and one member nominated by the governor.The normal term of the legislative assembly is five years from the date appointed for its first meeting

=== Judiciary ===
The Telangana High Court is the apex court for the state. It is a court of record and has all the powers of such a court including the authority to punish an individual for contempt of court.

=== Executive ===
Like in other Indian states, the executive arm of the state is responsible for the day-to-day management of the state. It consists of the Governor, the Chief Minister and the Council of Ministers.

The secretariat headed by the secretary to the governor assists the council of ministers. The chief minister is assisted by the chief secretary, who is the head of the administrative services.

==== Chief Minister ====
The executive authority is headed by the Chief Minister of Telangana, who is the de facto head of state and is vested with most of the executive powers; the Legislative Assembly's majority party leader is appointed to this position by the governor. The current Chief Minister is Anumula Revanth Reddy, who took office on 7 December 2023. Generally, the party which reaches more than half mark i.e. 60 seats out of 119 decides the Chief Minister.

==== Council of Ministers ====
The Council of Ministers, which answers to the Legislative Assembly, has its members appointed by the Governor; the appointments receive input from the Chief Minister. They are collectively responsible to the legislative assembly of the State. Generally, the winning party and its chief minister chooses the ministers list and submit the list for the governor's approval.

==== Administrative divisions ====
Telangana State is divided into 33 districts. The business of the state government is transacted through the various secretariat departments based on the rules of business. Each department consists of secretary to government, who is the official head of the department and such other undersecretaries, junior secretaries, officers, and staffs subordinate to him/her. The Chief secretary superintending control over the whole secretariat and staff attached to the ministers.

== Elections ==
Elections to the state assembly are held every five years. Elections are generally held for Parliament, State assembly and regional panchayats. Like all other Indian states, the minimum age of registration of a voter is 18 years.

Election Commission announced dates for elections in five states including Madhya Pradesh, Rajasthan, Telangana, Chhattisgarh and Mizoram. Polls in Telangana were conducted on November 30, and results were announced on December 3: EC

== See also ==
- T App Folio
- T-Fiber
