= Syed Aminul Hasan Jafri =

Indian politician

Member of Legislative Council
- In office 2010 – 1 May 2023
- Succeeded by: Mirza Rahmat Baig Quadri

Personal details
- Born: 25 January 1955 (age 71)
- Party: All India Majlis-e-Ittehadul Muslimeen
- Spouse: Rasheda Sultana
- Parent: Syed Ahmed Hussain Jafri
- Education: Osmania University
- Occupation: Politician
- Profession: Journalist

Syed Aminul Hasan Jafri is an Indian journalist and politician. He served as a member of Legislative Council of the political party All India Majlis-e-Ittehadul Muslimeen (AIMIM), and was elected to the Telangana Legislative Council in 2011 and again elected in 2017.

== Career ==
=== Journalism ===
Jafri did his master's degree of journalism at Osmania University.

In May 2010, Jafri was felicitated at Basheerbagh in Hyderabad by Andhra Pradesh Union of Working Journalists, Hyderabad Union of Journalists.

=== Politics ===
In 2010, Jafri was nominated by the All India Majlis-e-Ittehadul Muslimeen party for the Andhra Pradesh Legislative Assembly, and was elected.

In February 2017, it was announced that Jafri would be retiring from his position on 1 May. In March of that year, he was re-elected unopposed to the Legislative Council for the third time. He did not face any opposition, due to an alliance of All India Majlis-e-Ittehadul Muslimeen and Telangana Rashtra Samiti. He was also the only person from his party to be elected.

In 2022, he was appointed Pro tem Chairman of the Telangana State Legislative Council, and has left the position as his term expired back in May 2023. He left AIMIM in the same year.
