= Rythu Samanvaya Samithi =

Indian agricultural cooperative in Telangana State

- Formation: March 2018
- Type: Agricultural organization
- Purpose: Agriculture
- Location: Hyderabad
- Region served: Telangana
- Key people: Palla Rajeshwar Reddy (Chairman)

Rythu Samanvaya Samithi (RSS) also Farmers’ Coordination Committee is an agriculture cooperative set up by the Government of Telangana to transform agricultural activity, development and farmer welfare in the state. The farmer investment support scheme, Rythu Bandhu scheme is to be distributed through this committees at the village level. The Ex Chairman of Rythu Samanvaya Samithi is Palla Rajeshwar Reddy Ex MLC, Telangana Legislative Council.

== History ==
The committees were announced at by the Chief Minister of Telangana, K. Chandrashekhar Rao. The committee came into existence on 26 February 2018. This scheme was held for farmers.

== Organization ==
The organization with 1,61,000 farmer members in the state is formed. The Farmer Committees at different levels are:

- Village level - 15 members
- Mandal level - 24 members
- District level - 24 members
- State level - 42 members

The State level committee will have farmers, agricultural officers, scientists and experts as its members. An Agriculture Extension officer for every 5000 acres were appointed by the government.

== The Corporation ==
The corporation was started as a non-profit organization. The duties and responsibilities for the members to play an active role in the agricultural operations; sowing the seeds, to selling the produce at Minimum Support Price (MSP).

Around 2,630 farmers’ association buildings will be constructed, one per every 5,000 acres, for the farmers to hold meetings, discuss and exchange views with other farmers. Mobile Soil Testing Labs would also operate from 137 Rythu Vedikas.
