= M. Srinivas Reddy =

Indian politician (born 1939)

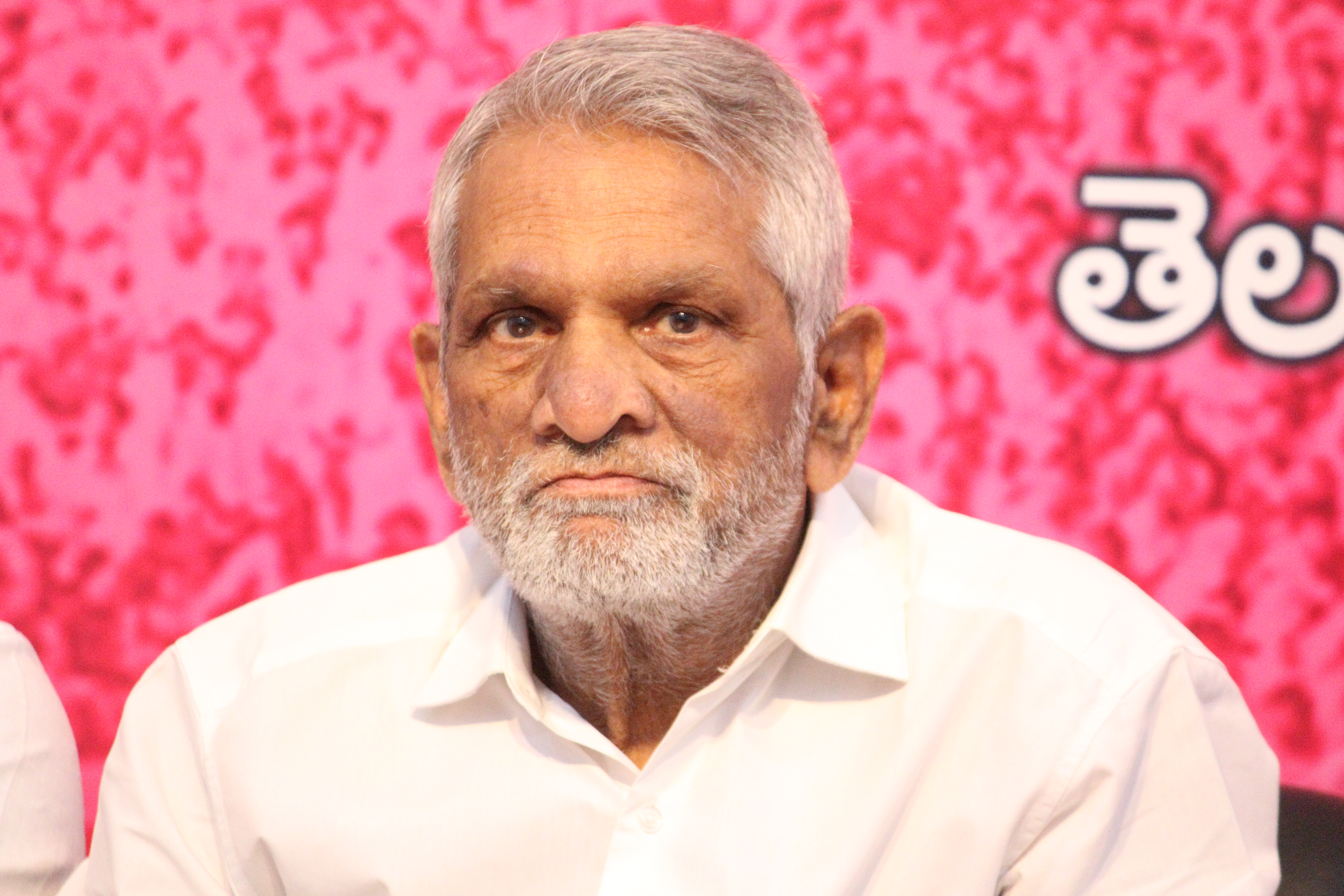

Member of Telangana Legislative Council
- Incumbent
- Assumed office 2015 - 2021
- Constituency: Nominated by Governor

Personal details
- Born: Madireddy Srinivas Reddy; 20 July 1939 (age 86) Momnoor, Warangal, Telangana, India
- Party: Bharat Rashtra Samithi
- Spouse: Pushpalatha
- Parent(s): Ramakrishna Reddy, Amruthamma

Madireddy Srinivas Reddy is an Indian politician from Telangana who served as member of the Telangana Legislative Council from 2015 to 2021. He is a member of the Bharat Rashtra Samithi.

He earlier worked as party general secretary and Bharat Rashtra Samithi party headquarters in-charge.
