= Mission Bhagiratha =

Safe drinking water project in Telangana, India

- Type of project: Safe drinking water
- Location: Telangana, India
- Founder: Government of Telangana
- Chief Minister: K.Chandrashekhar Rao
- Ministry: TDWSCL
- Established: 6 August 2016
- Budget: ₹43,791 crores
- Status: Active
- Website: Official website

Mission Bhagiratha is a safe drinking water project for every village in Telangana State, with a budget of ₹43,791 crores. The project aims to provide piped water to 2.32 crore people in 20 lakh households in urban and 60 lakhs in rural areas of Telangana. The project will supply clean drinking water to all households in the state through water sourced from the River Godavari (53.68 TMC) and the River Krishna (32.43TMC). The bulk supply is expected to be completed by May 2018, and intra-village, intra-locality works will be completed by December 2018.

== History ==
That project is named for King Bhagiratha, who, according to myth, brought the River Ganga to Earth from the heavens.

The inspiration for the project was driven by the residents who relied on contaminated groundwater. In drought-prone Nalgonda district, 973 villages faced high fluoride content that leads to disease and fluorosis.

A similar project, Maneru Manchineella Pathakam, was conceived and completed by K.C.R, when he was MLA for Siddipet Assembly Constituency in 1996-97, at a cost of ₹100 crores. The water was sourced from Lower Manair Dam and supplied to all households in 180 villages across Siddipeta constituency. The Chief Minister vowed in 2016 that he would not seek votes in 2019 if the water project was not completed by 2018. The project was completed successfully. It received an award from the Central Jal Shakti Minister Gajendra Singh Shekhawat in Rajya Sabha that Telangana is the only state in India providing piped water for every house hold in the state.

The project was launched by the Prime Minister of India, Narendra Modi at Komatibanda village, Medak district in Gajwel constituency on 6 August 2016. The other dignitaries were, the Chief Minister of Telangana, K Chandrashekar Rao.

== Technical feasibility study ==
The central government-owned, Water and Power Consultancy Services (WAPCOS) has vetted DPRs, Monitoring, Supervision, and Quality Control of TDWSP works.

The technical feasibility and design was done by irrigation officials. Indian Institute of Science (IISc), Indian Water Works Association, a foremost expert on a piped network, Dr. Srinivasa Lingireddy of Civil Engineering at the University of Kentucky, who has over 20 years of experience in pipe network modeling was consulted for the project. Lea Associates (LASA) prepared the tender process.

== Project ==
The project is divided into 26 segments, comprising 25,000 habitations, at an estimated cost of ₹42,853 crores, for which the state government has taken a loan of ₹32,000 crores. The Krishna and Godavari rivers and existing reservoirs will be interlinked to collect, reserve and supply treated drinking water in the state, to every household in over 25,000 villages and 65 towns. The target is to provide 100 liters drinking water per person in rural areas, and 150 liters per person in urban areas. Around 4 TMC is planned for industrial use. The project required 13,000 permissions from various departments like railways, defense, national highways, forest, irrigation, panchayat raj, roads and buildings.

Telangana Drinking Water Supply Corporation (TDWSCL) was established by the government to implement Mission Bhagiratha. 59 overhead and ground-level tanks are available. 40 TMC water is sourced from tanks and reservoirs, the areas range from 100 acres to 10,000 acres.

The piping system runs through 1.697 lakh kilometers. The electricity required is 182 megawatts.

=== Maintenance ===
The project Contractor is to take care of the maintenance of the entire water network for 10 years, at no additional cost to the government.

== Water purification ==
The 150 water treatment plants, 62 pumping stations, 35,573 Overhead service reservoirs, 27 intake wells are set up. The electric motors and pumping systems were sourced from BHEL with advanced technology.

== See also ==
- Drinking water quality standards
