= Palla Rajeshwar Reddy =

Indian politician

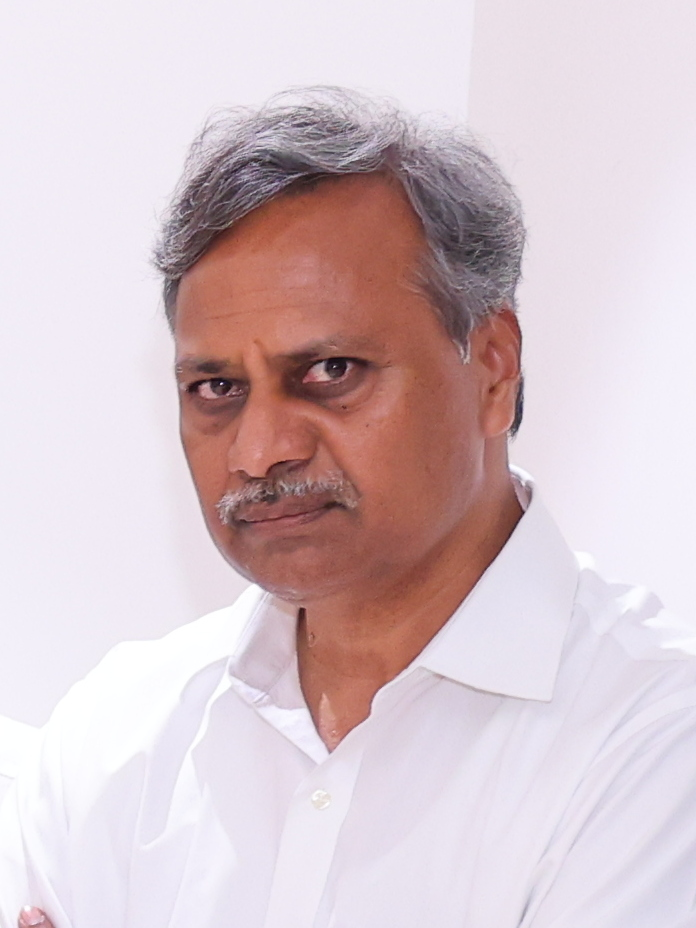

Member of the Telangana Legislative Assembly
- Incumbent
- Assumed office 3 December 2023
- Preceded by: Muthireddy Yadagiri Reddy
- Constituency: Jangaon

Member of Legislative Council
- Incumbent
- Assumed office 2015 March 30 – 2023 December 9
- Preceded by: Teenmar Mallanna
- Constituency: Warangal–Khammam–Nalgonda Graduates

Personal details
- Born: 4 November 1963 (age 62) Sodheshpally, Telangana, India
- Party: Bharat Rashtra Samithi
- Spouse: Neelima
- Children: Anurag, Apuroop
- Parent(s): Palla Raghava Reddy, Anusuya Reddy
- Education: PhD Osmania University
- Profession: Educationalist, politician

Palla Rajeshwar Reddy (born 4 November 1963) is an Indian politician from the state of Telangana. He is elected to the 2023 Telangana Legislative Assembly election from Jangaon Assembly constituency representing Bharat Rashtra Samithi.

== Early life ==
Palla Rajeshwar Reddy born in Sodashapalli village of Velair mandal in Warangal-Urban district in 1963. He was associated with the Students Federation of India (SFI), during his university days and later in 1986 he secured a doctorate degree in physics from Osmania University.

== Political career ==
Palla Rajeshwar Reddy started his political journey with the Bharat Rashtra Samithi (Then TRS) party and unsuccessfully contested from Nalgonda Lok Sabha Elections which was held in 2014 later in 2015 he contested Telangana Legislative Council Elections from Warangal–Khammam–Nalgonda Graduates constituency elections and was elected as a Member of the Legislative Council (MLC) and served as Govt. Whip in Council from 2016 to 2019. He was appointed chairman, Rythu Samanwaya Samithi on 17 November 2019.

Palla Rajeshwar Reddy was party in-charge for Huzurnagar Assembly constituency byelection which was held in 2019 and TRS candidate Shanampudi Saidireddy won with a margin of over 43,000 votes. Palla Rajeshwar Reddy contested Telangana Legislative Council Elections in 2021 from Warangal–Khammam–Nalgonda Graduates constituency elections and was elected as a Member of the Legislative Council (MLC) for the second time with a majority of 12, 806 votes.

Palla Rajeshwar Reddy was named as Bharat Rashtra Samithi party candidate in 2023 Telangana Legislative Assembly elections and was elected as Member of Legislative Assembly from Jangaon Assembly constituency with a majority of 15,783 votes.
