= Balmoor Venkat =

Indian politician from Telangana

Member of Telangana Legislative Council
- In office 22 January 2024 – Incumbent
- Constituency: Elected by MLAs

NSUI Telangana President
- In office 2018–2024
- In office 2015–2017

Personal details
- Born: Balmoor Venkat Narsing Rao; 1992 (age 33–34) Tharupalle, Kalva Srirampur Mandal, Peddapalli district, Telangana, India
- Party: Indian National Congress
- Education: MBBS from Chalmeda Anand Rao Institute of Medical Science, Karimnagar

Balmoor Venkat Narsing Rao is an Indian politician from Telangana. He was elected unanimously as member of the Telangana Legislative Council under the MLA quota on 22 January 2024.

== Political career ==
Balmoor Venkat started his political journey with NSUI and later he was elected as NSUI State President in 2015 and held various positions in Congress party. He unsuccessfully contested the 2021 By-election held for Huzurabad as a Congress candidate and managed to get only 3,014 votes. When the Congress was in the Opposition he as NSUI state president had launched many agitations, holding protests across the State and filed many PILs on behalf of students and unemployed youth. He was jailed numerous times by the BRS regime.

In 2022, Rahul Gandhi visited Chanchalguda Central Jail when he was jailed along with 18 NSUI members in for staging a protest at Osmania University on May 1 for denial of permission for Rahul Gandhi’s visit to the Osmania University.

After Congress came in to power in 2023 Elections, Balmoor Venkat's candidature was announced for member of the Legislative Council (MLC) under the MLAs' quota on 17 January 2024 and filed his nomination on 18 January 2024 and as no other nomination was filed from others, the election authorities declared him elected unopposed as MLC on 22 January 2024 and he took oath as Member of the Legislative Council (MLC) on 31 January 2024 in Legislative council chairman Gutha Sukender Reddy's chamber.

He was Appointed as Govt Whip on 19 March 2026.
