= P. Sripal Reddy =

Indian politician, academic

Pingili Sripal Reddy

Member of the Telangana Legislative Council
- Incumbent
- Assumed office 30 March 2025
- Preceded by: Alugubelli Narsi Reddy
- Constituency: Warangal-Khammam-Nalgonda Teachers Constituency

Personal details
- Born: 20/01/1973
- Party: PRTU
- Occupation: Politician; Educationalist

Pingili Sripal Reddy is an Indian politician from Telangana. He was elected as a member in the Telangana Legislative Council election from Warangal-Khammam-Nalgonda Teacher's constituency on 3 March 2025.

== Political career ==
Sripal Reddy contested election from Warangal-Khammam-Nalgonda Teacher's constituency as Progressive Recognised Teachers' Union Telangana State (PRTU) candidate and defeated his nearest rival UTF candidate Alugubelli Narsi Reddy.
