= Warangal–Khammam–Nalgonda Graduates constituency =

Graduates constituency of the Telangana Legislative Council, India

Warangal–Khammam–Nalgonda Graduates
- Indian electoral constituency

Constituency details
- Country: India
- Region: South India
- State: Telangana
- Established: 2007
- Reservation: None
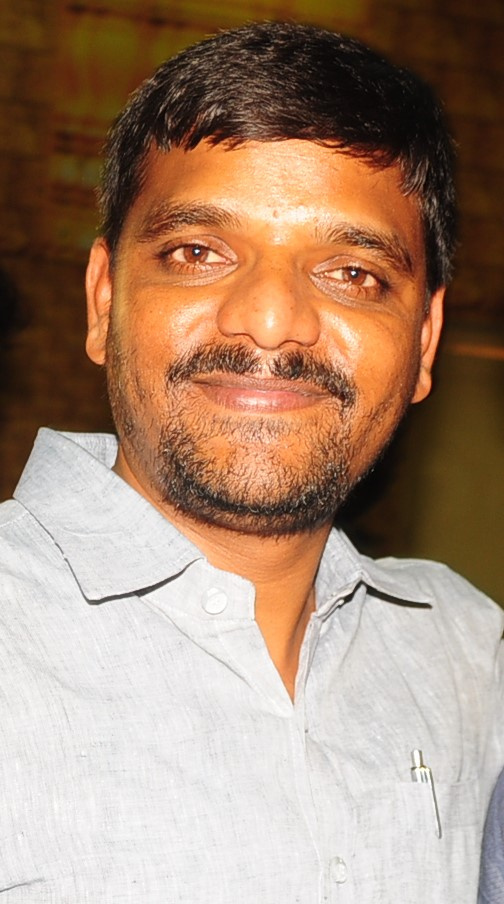
- Party: INC
- Elected year: 2024

Warangal–Khammam–Nalgonda Graduates constituency is a constituency in Warangal district, Khammam district, Nalgonda district, Bhadradri Kothagudem district, Mulugu district, Jangaon district, Mahabubabad district, Yadadri Bhuvanagiri district, Suryapet district, Hanamkonda district, and parts of Jayashankar Bhupalpally district, and Siddipet district of Telangana that elects representatives to the Telangana Legislative Council in India. It is one of the three council constituencies representing graduates.

Dileep Kumar won the seat twice in 2007 and 2009. He is the only member to be elected during the unified Andhra Pradesh. Palla Rajeshwar Reddy became the first elected member after the creation of Telangana.

== Districts ==
District
Warangal
Khammam
Nalgonda
Bhadradri Kothagudem
Mulugu
Siddipet
Jangaon
Mahabubabad
Jayashankar Bhupalpally
Yadadri Bhuvanagiri
Suryapet
Hanamkonda

== Members of the Legislative Council ==
Year	Member	Political party
2007	Dileep Kumar	Telangana Rashtra Samithi
2009	Dileep Kumar	Telangana Rashtra Samithi
2015	Palla Rajeshwar Reddy	Bharat Rashtra Samithi
2021	Palla Rajeshwar Reddy	Bharat Rashtra Samithi
2024 (Note: Bye-election due to Palla Rajeshwar Reddy's resignation as he was elected to the Telangana Legislative Assembly in the 2023 Telangana Legislative Assembly election)	Teenmar Mallanna (Note: Elected as an INC candidate who later resigned from the party and has since continued as an Independent)	Indian National Congress
