= Mirza Rahmat Baig =

Indian politician

Member of Legislative Council, Telangana
- Incumbent
- Assumed office 2023–present
- Constituency: Hyderabad Local Authorities

Personal details
- Party: All India Majlis-e-Ittehadul Muslimeen

Mirza Rahmat Baig or Mirza Rahmat Bhaig Quadri is an Indian politician member of the Telangana Legislative Council since 2023 He was a member of the All India Majlis-e-Ittehadul Muslimeen (AIMIM) and constituency Hyderabad.

== Political career ==
In the 2021 Telangana Legislative Council elections for the Hyderabad Local Authorities constituency, Mirza Rahmat Baig was declared elected unopposed. Other candidates, including independent civic advocate Mohammed Rahim Khan, had also filed nominations, but their papers were rejected or withdrawn.

== Controversies ==
AIMIM expelled its Member of the Legislative Council, Mirza Rahmath Baig, on August 29 2026, directing him to resign from the Telangana Legislative Council. The party's official statement did not specify the reason for the disciplinary action. The development follows Baig's complaint to the Cyber Crime Police regarding alleged blackmail attempts using deepfake content, and also comes amid unverified reports about an alleged incident involving a minor.
