= Mirza Riyaz Ul Hassan Effendi =

Indian politician

Member of the Telangana Legislative Council

Personal details
- Born: 26 July 1977 (age 48) Hyderabad
- Party: All India Majlis-e-Ittehadul Muslimeen
- Spouse: Shabana Ali
- Parent: Mirza Sayeedul Hasan Parvez Effendi (father)
- Education: B.Com

Mirza Riyaz Ul Hassan Effendi is an Indian politician currently serving as a Member of the Telangana Legislative Council since 2019. He is a member of the All India Majlis-e-Ittehadul Muslimeen. He was corporator from Dabeerpura (Ward No: 30) of GHMC.

== Early life and education ==
Ul Effendi was born to Mirza Sayeedul Hasan Parvez Effendi and Khadija Begum Effendi on 26 July 1977. He completed his bachelor's degree in commerce.

== Political career ==
In 2009, Effendi got elected as a corporator of Noor Khan Bazaar Division in GHMC and in 2016, he got elected as a corporator from Dabeerpura (Ward No: 30) of GHMC. Later in 2019, he got elected as the Member of Telangana Legislative Council (MLC) under the MLAs quota by getting 19 votes.

== Positions held ==
#	From	To	Position
1	2009		GHMC Corporator from Noor Khan Bazaar Division.
2	2016	2019	GHMC Corporator from Dabeerpura (Ward No: 30).
3	2019	2025	MLC in Telangana Legislative Council.
4	25 April 2025	Incumbent	MLC in Telangana Legislative Council.
