= Medak–Nizamabad–Adilabad–Karimnagar Graduates constituency =

Graduates constituency of the Telangana Legislative Council, India

Medak–Nizamabad–Adilabad–Karimnagar Graduates
- Indian electoral constituency

Constituency details
- Country: India
- Region: South India
- State: Telangana
- Established: 2007
- Reservation: None
- Party: BJP
- Elected year: 2025

Medak–Nizamabad–Adilabad–Karimnagar Graduates constituency is a constituency in Medak district, Nizamabad district, Adilabad district, Karimnagar district, Mancherial district, Komaram Bheem Asifabad district, Nirmal district, Jagtial district, Kamareddy district, Peddapalli district, Rajanna Sircilla district, and parts of Jayashankar Bhupalpally district, and Siddipet district of Telangana that elects representatives to the Telangana Legislative Council in India. It is one of the three council constituencies representing graduates.

Naradasu Laxman Rao was the inaugural holder of the seat in 2007. T. Jeevan Reddy became the first elected member after the creation of Telangana.

== Districts ==
District
Medak
Nizamabad
Adilabad
Karimnagar
Mancherial
Komaram Bheem Asifabad
Nirmal
Jagtial
Kamareddy
Peddapalli
Rajanna Sircilla
Jayashankar Bhupalpally
Siddipet

== Members of the Legislative Council ==
Year	Member	Political party
2007	Naradasu Laxman Rao	Telangana Rashtra Samithi
2013	Kanakamamidi Swamy Goud	Bharat Rashtra Samithi
2019	Tatiparthi Jeevan Reddy	Indian National Congress
2025	Chinnamile Anji Reddy	Bharatiya Janata Party
