= C. Anji Reddy =

Indian politician, academic

Chinnamail Anji Reddy

Member of the Telangana Legislative Council
- Incumbent
- Assumed office 30 March 2025
- Preceded by: T. Jeevan Reddy
- Constituency: Medak–Nizamabad–Adilabad–Karimnagar Graduates

Personal details
- Born: 18 June 1966 (age 60) Ramachandrapuram (BHEL Township), Sangareddy district, Telangana, India
- Party: Bharatiya Janata Party
- Spouse: Godhavari
- Children: 2
- Education: Osmania University
- Occupation: Politician; Businessman

Chinnamile Anji Reddy is an Indian politician from Telangana. He was elected as a member in the Telangana Legislative Council election from Medak–Nizamabad–Adilabad–Karimnagar Graduates constituency on 3 March 2025.

== Political career ==
Anji Reddy started his journey with Rashtriya Swayamsevak Sangh (RSS) and later joined Bharatiya Janata Party and aspired Patancheru Assembly constituency ticket in 2014 elections but BJP didn't given ticket to him and he contested as Independent candidate and lost the election. He joined in Indian National Congress in presence of Rahul Gandhi on 25 April 2018 and he later joined Bharatiya Janata Party ahead of GHMC Polls in the presence of BJP Telangana state president Bandi Sanjay Kumar.

Anji Reddy was named as BJP's candidate for Medak–Nizamabad–Adilabad–Karimnagar Graduates constituency on 11 January 2025 and he submitted his nomination papers on 8 February 2025. Elections were held on February 27 and the votes were counted on 5 March 2025 a total 2,52,100 votes cast, in which 2,24,000 were consider valid and Over 28,000 votes were declared invalid. Anji Reddy secured 78,635 votes, congress's Narender Reddy with 73,644 votes followed by BSP's Prasanna Harikrishna with 63,404 votes who stood third as no candidates secured the stipulated 50%+1 of the valid votes in the first preference vote count, EC went for second preference vote count in which Anji Reddy secured 98,637 votes, congress's Narender Reddy with 93,531 votes and CEO declared BJP candidate Anji Reddy won with a majority of 5,106 votes.
