= N. Naveen Kumar Reddy =

Indian politician

N. Naveen Kuamr Reddy
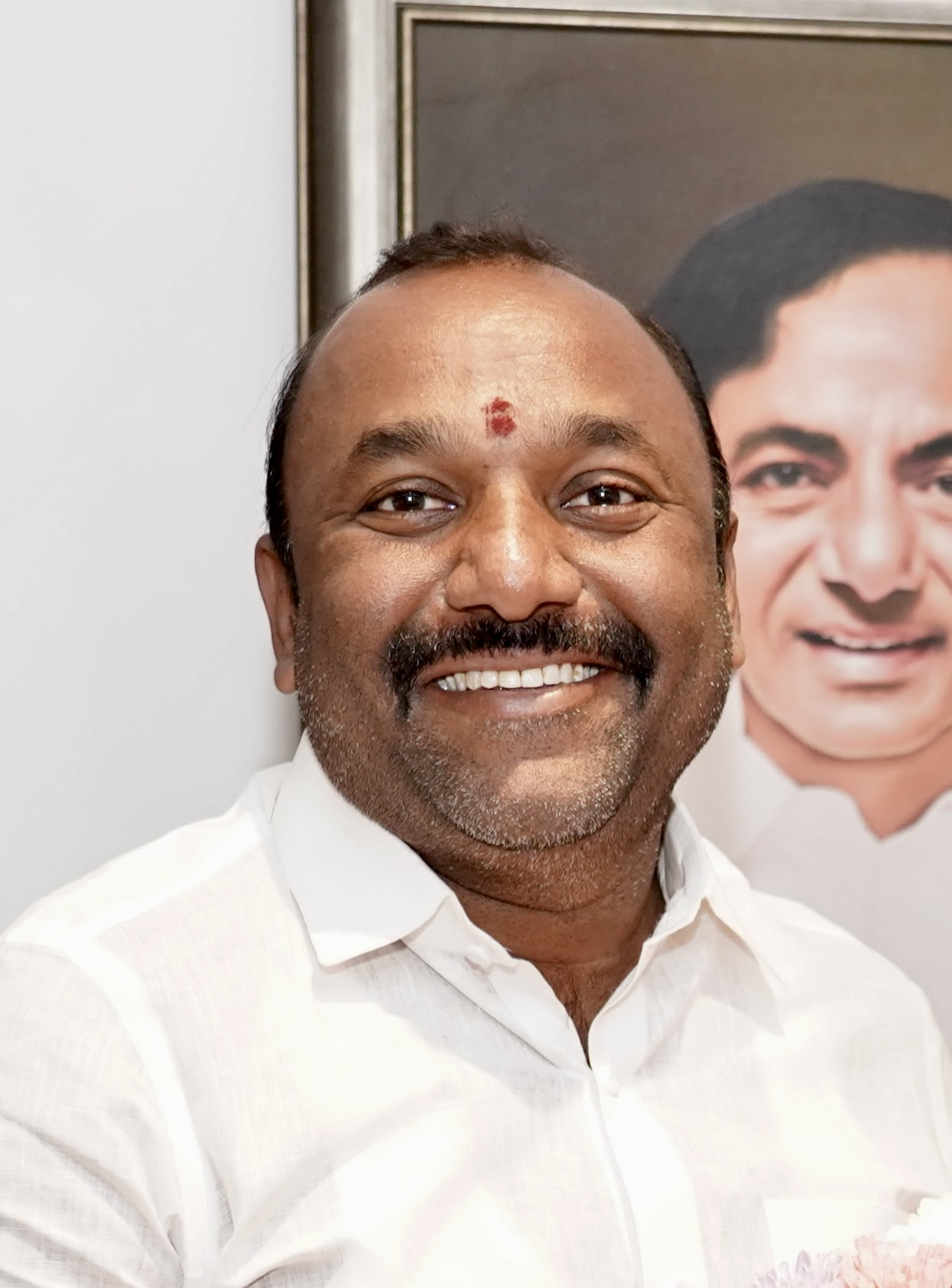

Member of Telangana Legislative Council
- Incumbent
- Assumed office 2 June 2024
- Constituency: Mahbubnagar (Local Authority Constituency)

Personal details
- Born: 1983 (age 42–43) Modallaguda, Nandigama Mandal, Ranga Reddy, Telangana
- Party: BRS
- Other political affiliations: INC
- Spouse: Lakshmi
- Parent: Venkatram Reddy
- Occupation: Politician

Nagarakunta Naveen Reddy is an Indian politician from the state of Telangana. He was elected as MLC in Telangana Legislative Council election from Mahabubnagar Local Bodies constituency bypoll in June 2024.

== Political career ==
N. Naveen Kumar Reddy started his political career with Congress party and won as Kothur Zptc and worked as Mahabubnagar District Zilla parishat Vice President from 2014 to 2019 and later joined Bharat Rashtra Samiti (BRS).

The Election Commission of India (ECI) issued the election notification for the vacant Mahbubnagar local authorities’ constituency seat in the Telangana Legislative Council on 26 February 2024. The election was necessitated as sitting member Kasireddy Narayan Reddy submitted his resignation on 8 December 2023, after he was elected as an MLA from Kalwakurthy in 2023 Assembly elections. Bharat Rashtra Samiti (BRS) has nominated N. Naveen Kumar Reddy as the party candidate for the bypoll which was held on 28 March.

Naveen Kumar Reddy won as Member of Telangana Legislative Council with a majority of 109 votes in which he secured 762 votes, while Congress nominee M Jeevan Reddy got 653 votes. An independent candidate got one vote.
