= Dande Vittal =

Indian politician from Telangana

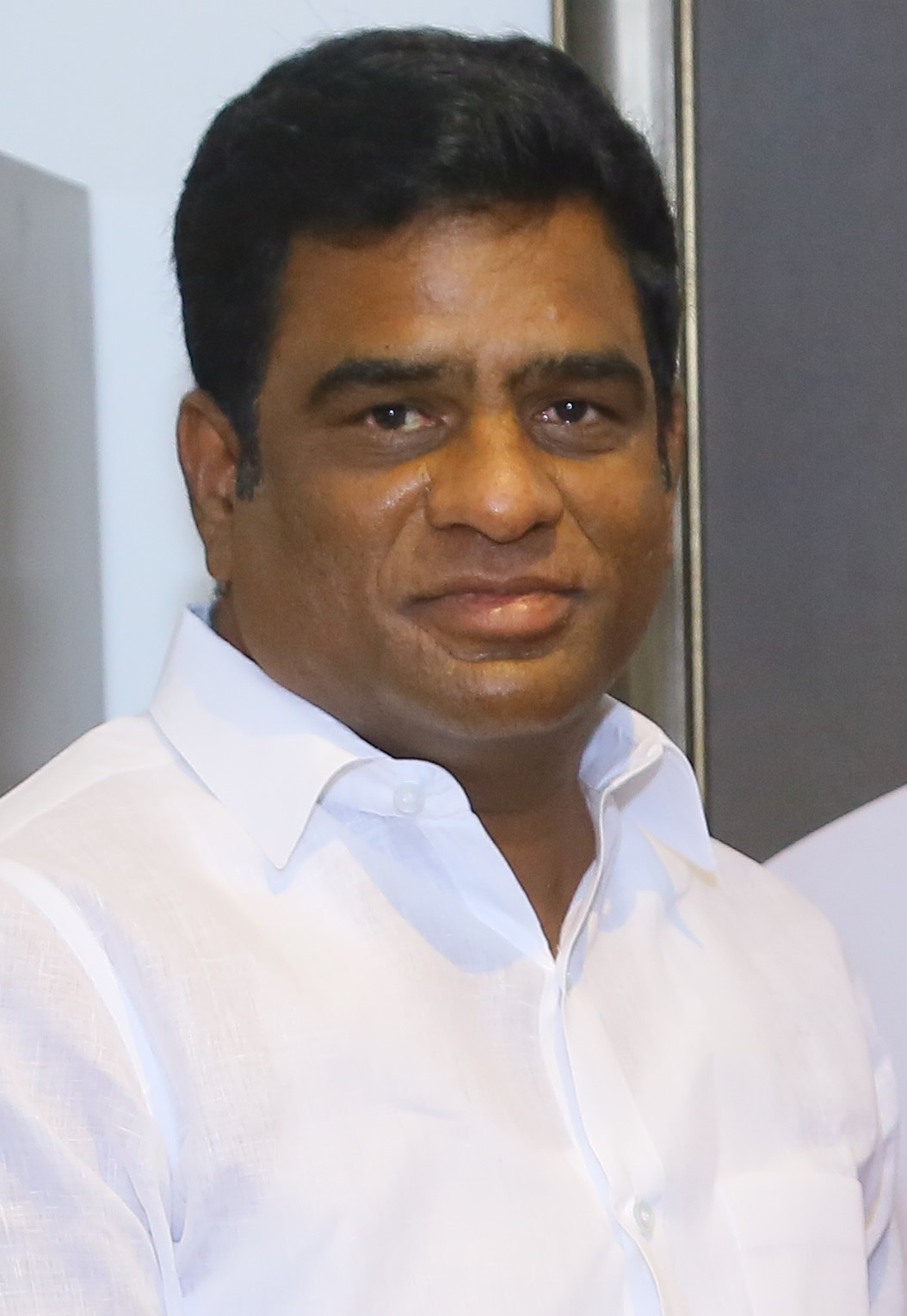
- Dande Vittal in 2021

Member of Telangana Legislative Council
- Incumbent
- Assumed office 05 January 2022
- Preceded by: Puranam Satish Kumar
- Constituency: Local Authorities Adilabad

Personal details
- Born: 22 December 1970 (age 55) Kagaznagar, Komaram Bheem Asifabad district, Telangana, India
- Party: Indian National Congress (since 2024)
- Other political affiliations: Bharat Rashtra Samithi (until 2024)
- Spouse: Madhavi Tathineni
- Children: 2

Dande Vittal is an Indian politician from Telangana. He was elected as member of the Telangana Legislative Council elected from the local body constituency of Adilabad in 2021.
