= Gutha Sukender Reddy =

Indian politician

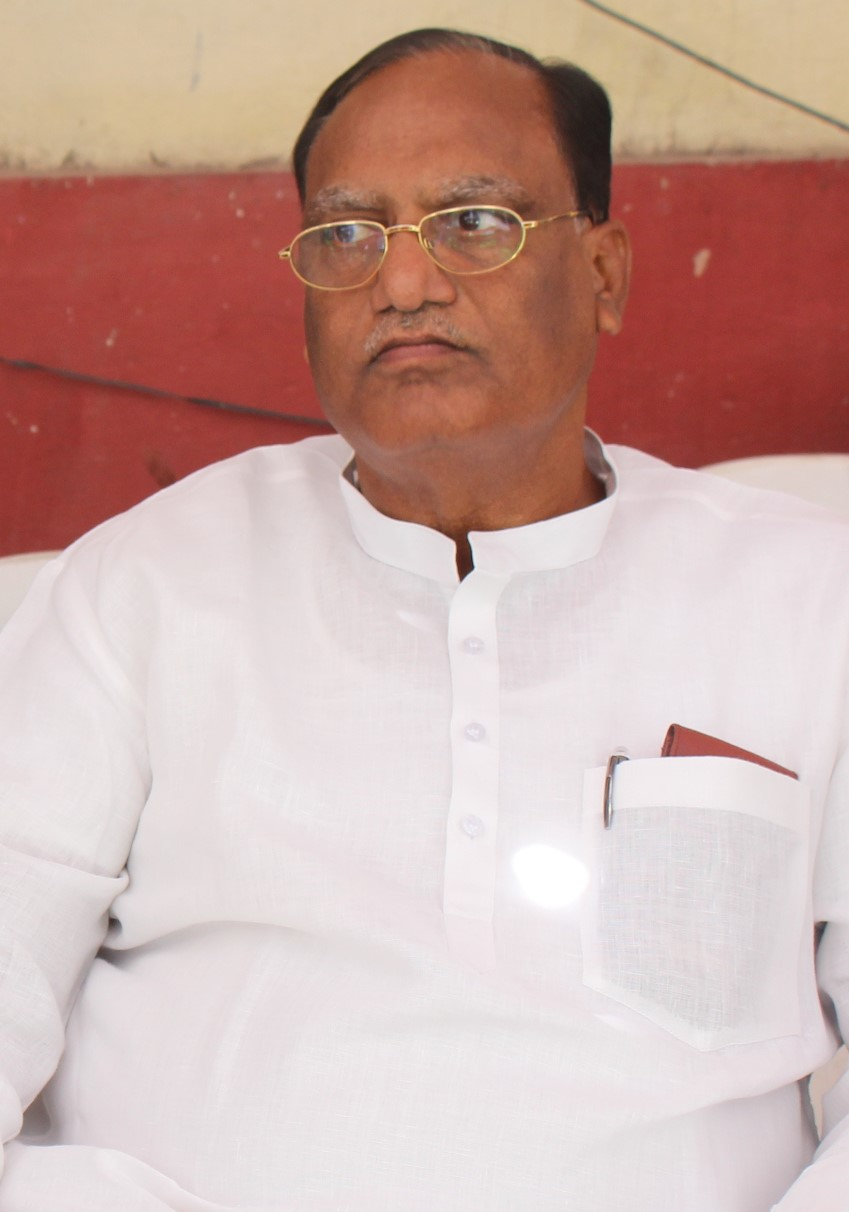

2nd Chairman of Telangana Legislative Council
- Incumbent
- Assumed office 14 March 2022
- Governor: • Tamilisai Soundararajan; •C.P. Radhakrishnan (additional charge); •Jishnu Dev Varma
- Leader of the House: ▪︎ K. Chandrashekar Rao; ▪︎ Revanth Reddy
- Deputy: ▪︎ Vacant; ▪︎ Banda Prakash; (since from 12 February 2023)
- Preceded by: Vacant
- In office 11 September 2019 – 3 June 2021
- Governor: Tamilisai Soundararajan
- Leader of the House: K. Chandrashekar Rao
- Deputy: Nethi Vidya Sagar
- Preceded by: K. Swamy Goud

Member of Legislative Council, Telangana
- Incumbent
- Assumed office 22 November 2021
- Chairperson: K. Swamy Goud
- Leader of the House: ▪︎ K. Chandrashekar Rao; ▪︎ Revanth Reddy
- Deputy: ▪︎ Vacant; ▪︎ Banda Prakash
- Constituency: Elected By MLAs, Telangana
- In office 11 August 2019 – 21 November 2021
- Chairperson: ▪︎ Vacant; ▪︎ Himself
- Deputy: Nethi Vidya Sagar
- Leader of the House: K. Chandrashekar Rao
- Constituency: Elected By MLAs, Telangana

Member of Parliament, Lok Sabha
- In office 6 October 1999 – 16 May 2004
- Preceded by: Suravaram Sudhakar Reddy
- Succeeded by: Suravaram Sudhakar Reddy
- Constituency: Nalgonda
- In office 16 May 2009 – 23 May 2019
- Preceded by: Suravaram Sudhakar Reddy
- Succeeded by: Nalamada Uttam Kumar Reddy
- Constituency: Nalgonda

Personal details
- Born: 2 February 1954 (age 72) Urmadla
- Party: Indian National Congress
- Other political affiliations: Telugu Desam Party Bharat Rashtra Samithi
- Spouse: Gutha Arundathi
- Children: 2

Gutha Sukender Reddy (born 2 February 1954) is an Indian INC politician who is the 2nd and current Chair of the Telangana Legislative Council since 14 March 2022. He was elected as MLC (Member of Legislative Council) in 2019 & 2021 respectively.

In the 2009 election he was elected to the 15th Lok Sabha from the Nalgonda constituency in Telangana. He was appointed Chairman of Telangana Rythu Samanvaya Samithi in February 2018. He is one of the strongest leaders in South Telangana Region. He has great command in his parliamentary constituency. Initially, his career was started in JP, later he joined the TDP. In 2009, he joined Congress party on the invitation of Y. S. Rajasekhara Reddy. In 2004, he unsuccessfully contested Nalgonda Legislative Assembly constituency. Because of negative wave against Chandrababu Naidu, he lost in that election. He is basically from an agricultural family.

== Early life ==
Gutha Sukender Reddy was born on 2 February 1954 into an agriculturist family from Urumadla Village, Chityal Mandal Nalgonda Dist., Telangana. Gutha Sukender Reddy is married and has a son and a daughter. He started his career as a farmer and fought for the farming community to facilitate the better supply of fertilizers. This struggle motivated him to fight for farmers and he represented the District Kisaan Youth Cell as president. During his education, Mr. Reddy represented the student body of the Nanakram Bhagavandas Science College in Hyderabad (1971–72) as general secretary. He was later elected as a Grampanchayat ward member from Urumadla, Nalgonda Dist. (1981). Reddy has been actively working ever since towards uplifting the downtrodden, the farmers and the laborers.

== Political statistics ==
	Year	Contested For	Party	Constituency	Votes	Opponent	Votes	Majority	Result
1	1999	MP	TDP	Nalgonda	427505	Kanukula Janardhan Reddy (INC)	347770	79735	Won
2	2004	MLA	TDP	Nalgonda	47080	Komatireddy Venkat Reddy (INC)	69818	-22738	Lost
3	2009	MP	INC	Nalgonda	493849	Suravaram Sudhakar Reddy (CPI)	340867	152982	Won
4	2014	MP	INC	Nalgonda	472093	Tera Chinnapa Reddy (TDP)	278937	193156	Won

== Service to the cooperative bodies and the Dairy Movement ==
Having been born into an agriculturist family, Reddy was involved in the district cooperative bodies and the Dairy Movement which helped to better the lives of many farmers and women.

- Nominated as the vice chairman for Chityal Agricultural Market Committee in 1984, and later took charge of the same as the chair in 1985.
- Involved in the co-operative movement and was elected as Single Window chairman (1992).
- Elected chairman for the Milk Cooperative Society from Urumadla (1992–99)
- Represented the Nalgonda and Ranga Reddy district milk producers Union as chairman (1992–1999)
- Dedicated his services to the Dairy Movement and constructed many chilling centers all over the two districts.
- In recognition of his services to the Dairy Movement, he was elected as chairman for Andhra Pradesh Dairy Development Cooperative Federation (1995–99) and was also nominated as a director to the National Dairy Development Board (1998).
- Served as chairman for Telangana Rashtra Raithu Samanvaya Samiti (TRRSS - A Telangana State Corporation established for Cooperation and Coordination amongst Farming fraternity and for their welfare and upliftment) (2018–19).

== Career accomplishments ==
- Actively participated in the struggle for Telangana statehood.
- Instrumental in completing the first Lift Irrigation Project in Telangana 'Srisailam Left Bank Canal project (AMRP)', and thereby facilitating the drought-stricken farmers of Nalgonda Dist. The project also supplies drinking water to hundreds of villages affected by fluorosis in Nalgonda and to the Greater Hyderabad Metro area.
- Successful amalgamation of Mother Dairy into Nalgonda and Rangareddy District Milk Unions, thereby bringing the unions into profits and financially strengthening the poor dairy farmers.
- Played vital role in the successful completion of National Highway 9/65 (Hyderabad - Vijayawada) & State Highway 02 (Narketpally – Addanki), saving innocent lives being lost in road accidents.
- Received sanction for 2-laning (National Highway) of Sirvancha (Maharashtra)-Nakrekal-Nalgonda- Nagarjunasagar-Renigunta, improving connectivity in Nalgonda district.
- Achieved two Centrally-sponsored Kendriya Vidyalayas in Nalgonda and Miryalaguda towns, ensuring the availability of quality education locally to the citizens of Nalgonda District.
- Was instrumental in securing central and state funds for the developments of Nalgonda, Miryalaguda, and Devarakonda divisions (RWS schemes, Model Schools etc.).
- Received sanction of two push-pull trains to Miryalaguda from Kachiguda (Hyd) via Nalgonda, facilitating scores of students, employees and everyday passengers.
- Received sanction of new 81-km railway line between Miryalaguda and Macherla.
- Pursued and received sanction for further development of Pendlipaka project, Nakkalagandi and Dindi reservoirs/projects benefitting the lakhs of farmers of Nalgonda.

== Positions held ==
As a part of his public career he had numerous opportunities to represent and solve various problems of his fellow citizens and constituents.

- Grampanchayat Ward Member from Urumadla village of Chityala Mandal, Nalgonda District (1981)
- Nominated as the vice chairman for Chityal Agricultural Market Committee in 1984 and later took charge for the same as the chairman of the Chityal Agricultural Market Committee.
- Single Window chairman, Chityal (1991)
- Served as chairman, District Vigilance and Monitoring Committee, Nalgonda.
- Served as member, Sri Venkateshwara Veterinary University, Tirupati.
- Zilla Parishad member (ZPTC), from Devarakonda, Nalgonda Dist. (1995)
- Chairman Nalgonda and Rangareddy Milk Producers Cooperative Union (1992–99)
- Served as member in various Parliamentary standing/consultative committee's on urban and rural development, information and broadcasting, energy, railways, commerce, etc. during his tenure as MP.
- Director, National Dairy Development Board of India (1998)
- Chairman, Andhra Pradesh Dairy Development Cooperative Federation (1995–99)
- Elected as a member of Parliament from Nalgonda - 13th Lok Sabha (1999-2004)
- Elected as the member of Parliament from Nalgonda Parliamentary constituency - 15th Lok Sabha (2009-2014)
- Elected as the member of Parliament from Nalgonda Parliamentary constituency - 16th Lok Sabha (2014-2019)
- Appointed chairman, Telangana Rashtra Raithu Samanvaya Samithi (2018-2019)
- Elected as the member of Telangana Legislative Council (19 August 2019)
- Elected as chairman Telangana Legislative Council (11 September 2019 - 3 June 2021)
- Elected as a member of Telangana Legislative Council (1 December 2021 - incumbent)
- Elected as chairman Telangana Legislative Council for the 2nd time (14 March 2022 - incumbent)

== Objectives ==
- Working towards betterment of agriculture and related industries, by strengthening the Agro-industry and farming fraternity who constitute the majority of the population.
- Strive to achieve sustainable financial independence for every Raithu/ Farmer.
- Uplifting the Common Man by providing better living conditions including Safety, Security, Education, Health Care, Employment, and Social Justice.
- Providing debt free infrastructure to rural India which inculcates social wellbeing of the poorest of the poor.
- Strive for the betterment of rural infrastructure
- Achieving community based rural development
