= Malka Komaraiah =

Indian politician, academic

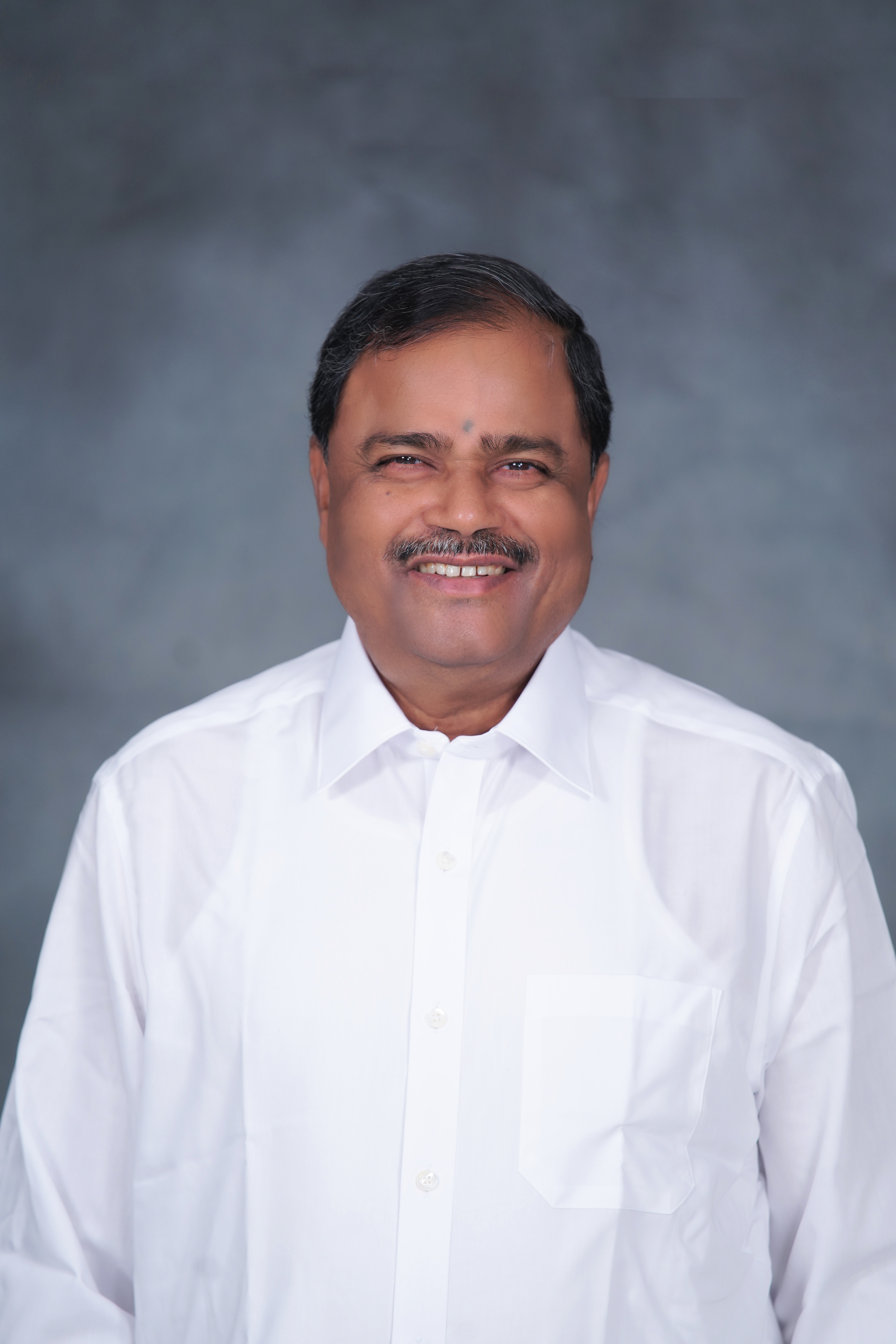

Member of the Telangana Legislative Council
- Incumbent
- Assumed office 30 March 2025
- Preceded by: Kura Raghotham Reddy
- Constituency: Karimnagar-Medak-Nizamabad-Adilabad Teachers Constituency

Personal details
- Born: Bandhampally, Peddapalli, Telangana, India
- Party: Bharatiya Janata Party
- Spouse: Pallavi
- Children: Malka Yasasvi, Tribuvana
- Occupation: Politician; Educationalist; Businessman

Malka Komaraiah is an Indian politician from Telangana. He was elected as a member in the Telangana Legislative Council election from Medak-Nizamabad-Adilabad-Karimnagar Teacher's constituency on 3 March 2025. He is a member of the Bharatiya Janata Party.

He owns Delhi Public School branches in Nacharam, Nadergul, Mahendra Hills, and Pallavi educational institutes in Peddapalli, Nirmal and Hyderabad.

He belongs to the Munnuru Kapu community, categorized as Other Backward Class (OBC) in Telangana.

== Political career ==
Mr. Komaraiah entered politics by joining Bharatiya Janata Party and aspired Malkajgiri Lok Sabha ticket in 2024 Parliamentary elections. He was named as BJP candiadete for Medak-Nizamabad-Adilabad-Karimnagar Teachers’ constituency which held on 27 February 2025 and won as MLC by defeating his nearest rival PRTU candidate Vanga Mahender Reddy with a margin of 5,777 first preference votes. Komaraiah secured 12,959 votes, Mahender Reddy got 7,182 votes out of the total 25,041 polled votes, in which 897 votes were declared invalid.
