= Nellikanti Satyam =

Indian politician

Member of Legislative Council Telangana
- Incumbent
- Assumed office 30 March 2025
- Constituency: Elected by MLAs

Personal details
- Born: 6 June 1969 (age 56) Yelagalagudem, Munugode Mandal, Nalgonda, Telangana, India
- Party: Communist Party of India
- Spouse: Annapurna
- Parent(s): Peddayya, Parvatamma
- Occupation: Politician

Nellikanti Satyam (born 6 June 1969) is an Indian politician from Telangana. He was elected unanimously as Member of Telangana Legislative Council on 13 March 2025.

He earlier served as CPI Nalgonda district secretary.

== Political career ==
Nellikanti Satyam started his political career with Communist Party of India and held various position in the party and he was announced as MLC candidate under the MLAs quota on 9 March 2025 and filed his nomination on March 10 and was elected unanimously as Member of Telangana Legislative Council on 13 March 2025.
