= Teenmar Mallanna =

Indian politician

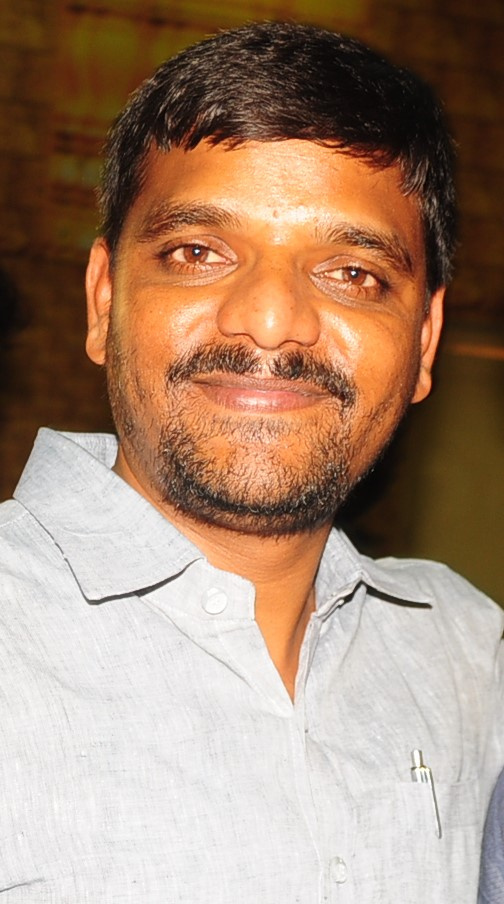

Member of Legislative Council, Telangana
- Incumbent
- Assumed office 7 June 2024
- Preceded by: Palla Rajeshwar Reddy
- Constituency: Warangal–Khammam–Nalgonda Graduates

Personal details
- Born: Chintapandu Naveen Kumar; 17 January 1983 (age 43) Madhapuram Village, Thurkapally MandaI, Nalgonda District, Telangana.
- Party: Telangana Rajyadhikara Party
- Other political affiliations: Indian National Congress (2023–2025); Bharatiya Janata Party (2021–2022)
- Spouse: Kondapuram Mathamma
- Children: 3
- Parent: Chintapandu Bagaiah (father)
- Education: (Osmania University); MBA (JNTUH)
- Occupation: Politician; Journalist

Teenmar Mallanna (Chintapandu Naveen Kumar) (born 17 January 1983) is an Indian politician from Telangana. He was elected as MLC in Telangana Legislative Council by election from Warangal–Khammam–Nalgonda Graduates constituency in June 2024.

He was a presenter of a satirical news bulletin "Teenmaar News" on V6 news channel during the Telangana agitation, and popularly known by his screen name Teenmaar Mallanna.

== Political career ==
Teenmar Mallanna contested as Congress party candidate from Warangal–Khammam–Nalgonda Graduates constituency in 2015 and finished third with BJP in second place and TRS candidate Palla Rajeshwar Reddy being the winner. He later contested unsuccessfully in Huzurnagar Assembly bypoll in 2019 and lost deposit, after the resignation of sitting MLA N Uttam Kumar Reddy following his election to the Lok Sabha.

In 2021 Warangal–Khammam–Nalgonda Graduates constituency elections Mallanna contested as Independent candidate and secured 83,520 votes, while TRS candidate Palla Rajeshwar Reddy remained victorious with 1,11,090 votes and won by a majority of 12,806 votes.

He joined the Bharatiya Janata Party in 2021 and quit in 2022.

Teenmaar Mallanna has joined the Congress party on 8 November 2023 in the presence of AICC Telangana Incharge Manikrao Thakare, TPCC Working President Mahesh Kumar Goud and later he was appointed Campaign Committee Convenor for 2023 Telangana Assembly Elections.

Teenmar Mallanna was named as Congress Candidate for 2024 Warangal–Khammam–Nalgonda Graduates constituency bypoll which was held in 2024. The MLC by-election was necessitated by the resignation of sitting BRS MLC Palla Rajeswar Reddy as he was elected to the Telangana Legislative Assembly held in December 2023. Mallanna was elected as an MLC as he got the highest number of votes among all the contestants, as no candidate crossed the magic figure of 1,55,095 after the first preference votes.

Mallanna criticized and burned the caste survey report released by the Telangana government in February and later Disciplinary Action Committee (DCA) of Telangana Pradesh Congress Committee (TPCC) issued him a show cause notice indulging in anti-party activities and asked him to submit his explanation on or before February 12. But the DAC has not received any explanation from him and he was dismissed from the Congress party on 1 March 2025.
