= Kethavath Shankar Naik =

Indian politician

Kethavath Shankar Nayak

Member of Legislative Council Telangana
- Incumbent
- Assumed office 30 March 2025
- Constituency: Elected by MLAs

Personal details
- Born: April 14, 1972 (age 54) Ketavath Thanda, Dameracherla, Nalgonda, Telangana, India
- Party: Indian National Congress
- Spouse: KETHAVATH LALITHA
- Children: KETHAVATH SONU& KETHAVATH AKHIL
- Education: degree
- Occupation: Politician

Kethavath Shankar Naik (born 14 April 1972) is an Indian politician from Telangana. He was elected unanimously as Member of Telangana Legislative Council on 13 March 2025.

== Political career ==
Shankar Naik started his political career with Indian National Congress and in 2001 he was appointed as Dameracherla congress mandal president. He was elected as ZPTC from Dameracherla in 2001, Dameracherla MPP in 2006, Congress block committee president in 2011. Shankar Naik was re-elected as ZPTC in 2018 from Damaracharla and was appointed as Nalgonda district Congress committee president in 2018.

Shankar Naik was announced as MLC candidate under the MLAs quota on 9 March 2025 and filed his nomination on March 10th and was elected unanimously as Member of Telangana Legislative Council on 13 March 2025.
