= Dasoju Sravan Kumar =

Indian politician

Dr. Dasoju Sravan Kumar
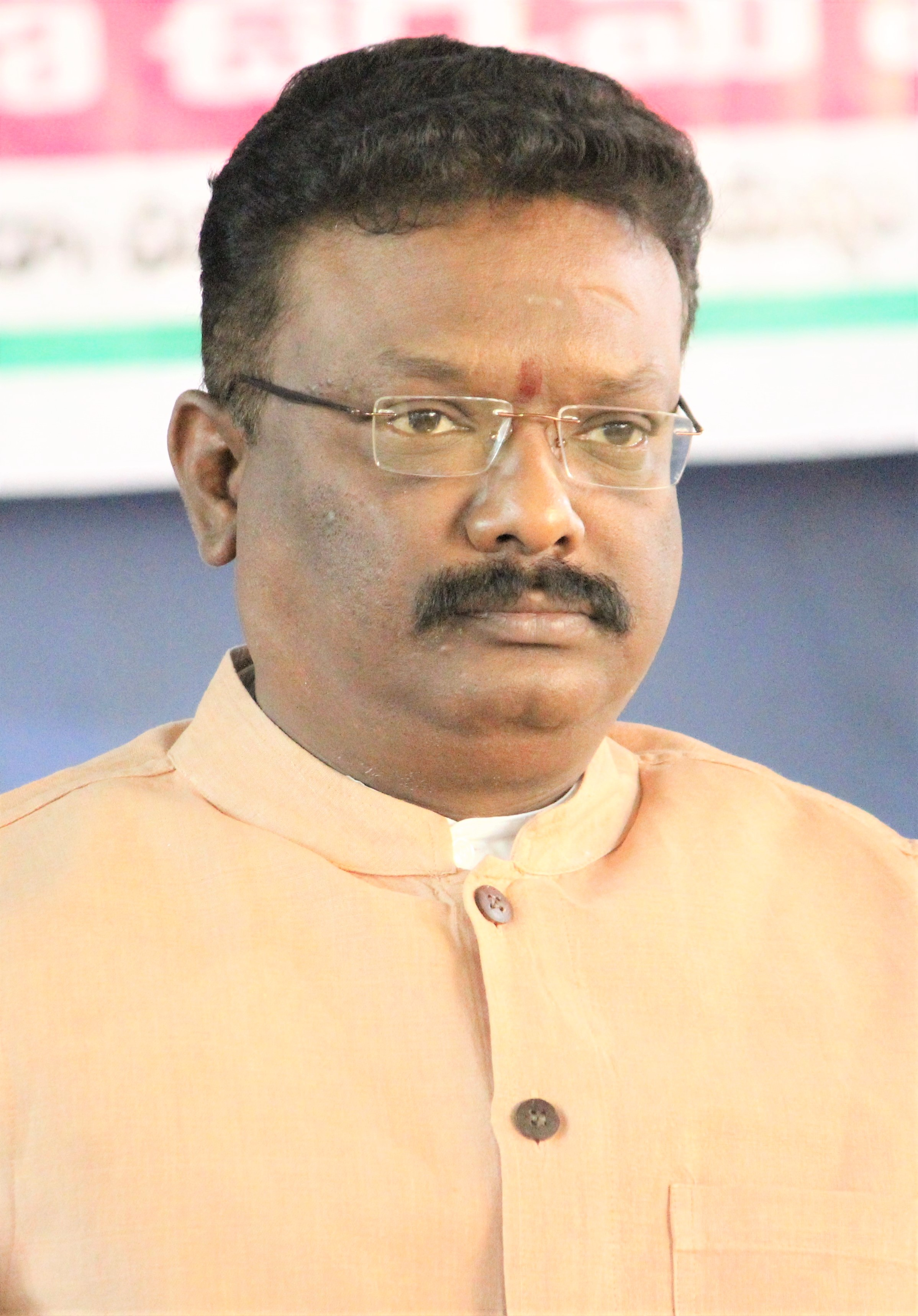

Member of Legislative Council Telangana
- Incumbent
- Assumed office 30 March 2025
- Constituency: Elected by MLAs

Personal details
- Born: 7 September 1966 (age 60) Nalgonda, Telangana, India
- Party: Bharat Rashtra Samithi
- Other political affiliations: Indian National Congress; Bharatiya Janata Party; Praja Rajyam Party
- Spouse: Shashikala
- Children: Mrinal, Gowri Narayani
- Parent(s): Late Dasoju Krishnamachary, Jogamma
- Education: Osmania University

Dr. Dasoju Sravan Kumar (born 7 September 1966) is an Indian politician from Telangana State. He was named as BRS candidate for MLC elections under the MLA quota on 9 March 2025 and unanimously elected as Member of Telangana Legislative Council on 13 March 2025.

== Political career ==
Dasoju Sravan Kumar started his career as RSS activist and was elected as general secretary of ABVP Arts College, Osmania University. He actively participated in all student movements and also fought for the rights of weaker sections. Sravan later joined Praja Rajyam Party and unsuccessfully contested from Secunderabad Lok Sabha constituency in 2009 Loksabha elections and stood third place with 91,414 votes. and later started taking active part in the Telangana movement and joined TRS Party he emerged as the Vocal Telangana Activist and a face of the Historical Struggle during the Telangana movement under Telangana ideologue Prof Jayashankar Sir and BRS founder KCR's mentoring. He was later appointed as TRS Politburo member and TRS party's official spokesperson. Dasoju Sravan Wanted to contest in elections from Bhongir or Musheerabad, But failed to get TRS party ticket and later he joined Congress Party on 12 April 2014 and was appointed as the Chief Spokesperson of TPCC

Dasoju Sravan Kumar unsuccessfully contested from Khairatabad Assembly Constituency in 2018 Telangana Assembly Elections and later he was appointed as All India Congress Committee (AICC) National Spokesperson. He left Congress blaming the functioning style of TPCC President Revanth Reddy and joined Bharatiya Janata Party in the presence of Telangana BJP in-charge Tarun Chugh on 5 August 2022. Sravan quit BJP and returned to Telangana Rashtra Samithi ahead of the Munugode Assembly Constituency byelection on 21 October 2022.

Sravan Kumar named as MLC under the Governor’s quota by BRS party in August 2023 after State Cabinet’s decision, but were rejected by the Governor Tamilisai Soundararajan referring to Article 171(5) of the Constitution, which says that Members of Legislative Councils nominated by the Governor shall have "special knowledge or practical experience" related to "literature, science, art, co-operative movement and social service."

Dasoju Sravan Kumar was named as BRS MLC candidate under the MLA quota on 9 March 2025 and unanimously elected as Member of Telangana Legislative Council on 13 March 2025. He took oath as MLC on 16 April 2025.
