= Swamy Goud =

Indian politician

K. Swamy Goud
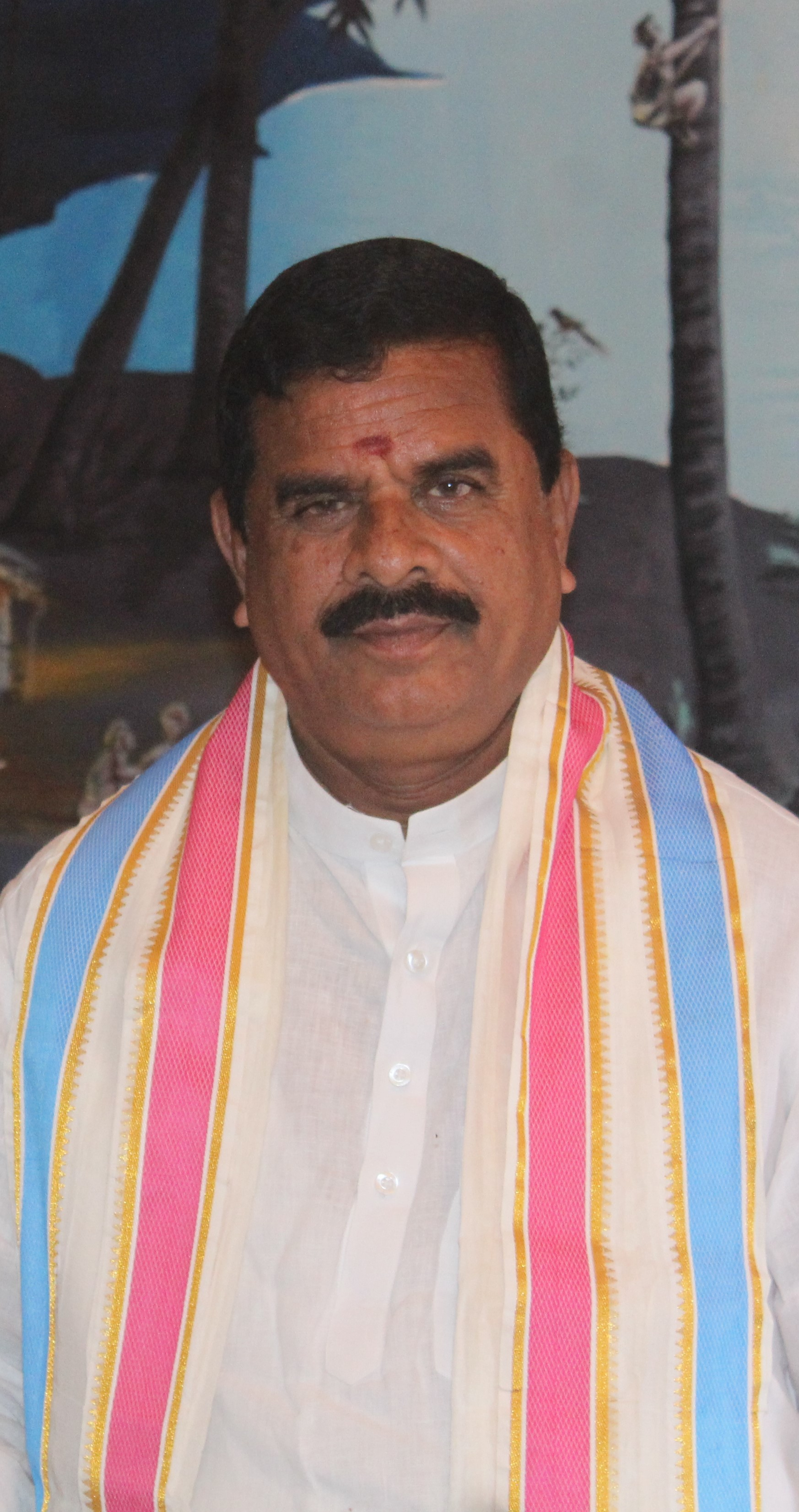
- Swamy at the US as of October 2015

Personal details
- Born: 5 July 1954 (age 72) Kismatpur, Ranga Reddy district, Telangana
- Party: Bharat Rashtra Samithi (2012–2020) (2022–present)
- Other political affiliations: Bharatiya Janata Party (2020–2022)
- Occupation: Politician
- Known for: Telangana activism

Kanakamamidi Swamy Goud (born 5 July 1954) is an Indian Politician from Bharat Rashtra Samithi. He Joined Bharatiya Janatha Party in 2020 and quit in 2022. He was the Chairman of Telangana Legislative Council from 2014 to 2019. He was the Politician of BRS from 2012 to 2020. He is convener of Telangana Joint Action Committee. He is a member of BRS politburo.

Goud won the legislative council seat from the Medak–Nizamabad–Adilabad–Karimnagar Graduates constituency that went to polls with five other seats on 21 February 2013. Goud polled 33,000 first preferential votes to win the graduates' seat.

== Early life ==
Goud was born in Kismatpur, Rajendranagar mandal, Ranga Reddy district of Telangana.

== Career ==
He worked with Andhra Pradesh Government for over 30 years. He was an active member of the trade union.

He started his career as an Attender.

During the 1977 cyclone in Krishna district, he helped perform cremations, supplying clothes and food under the guidance of Thomas.

He was a prominent activist for Telangana statehood and actively participated in many agitations. He was one of the people behind the employees strike for Telangana called Sakala Janula Samme. He retired from government service on 31 July 2012.

He joined Telangana Rashtra Samithi in November 2012 and was made its Politburo member. He was elected as an MLC from Karimnagar by securing 92.68% beating previous record of 85% by Atal Bihari Vajpayee.

K Swamy Goud resigned to TRS and joined BJP on 2020 November 26 in the presence of BJP national president J. P. Nadda in Delhi and later resigned to BJP and rejoined TRS in the presence of party's working president and K. T. Rama Rao on 21 October 2022 in Hyderabad.

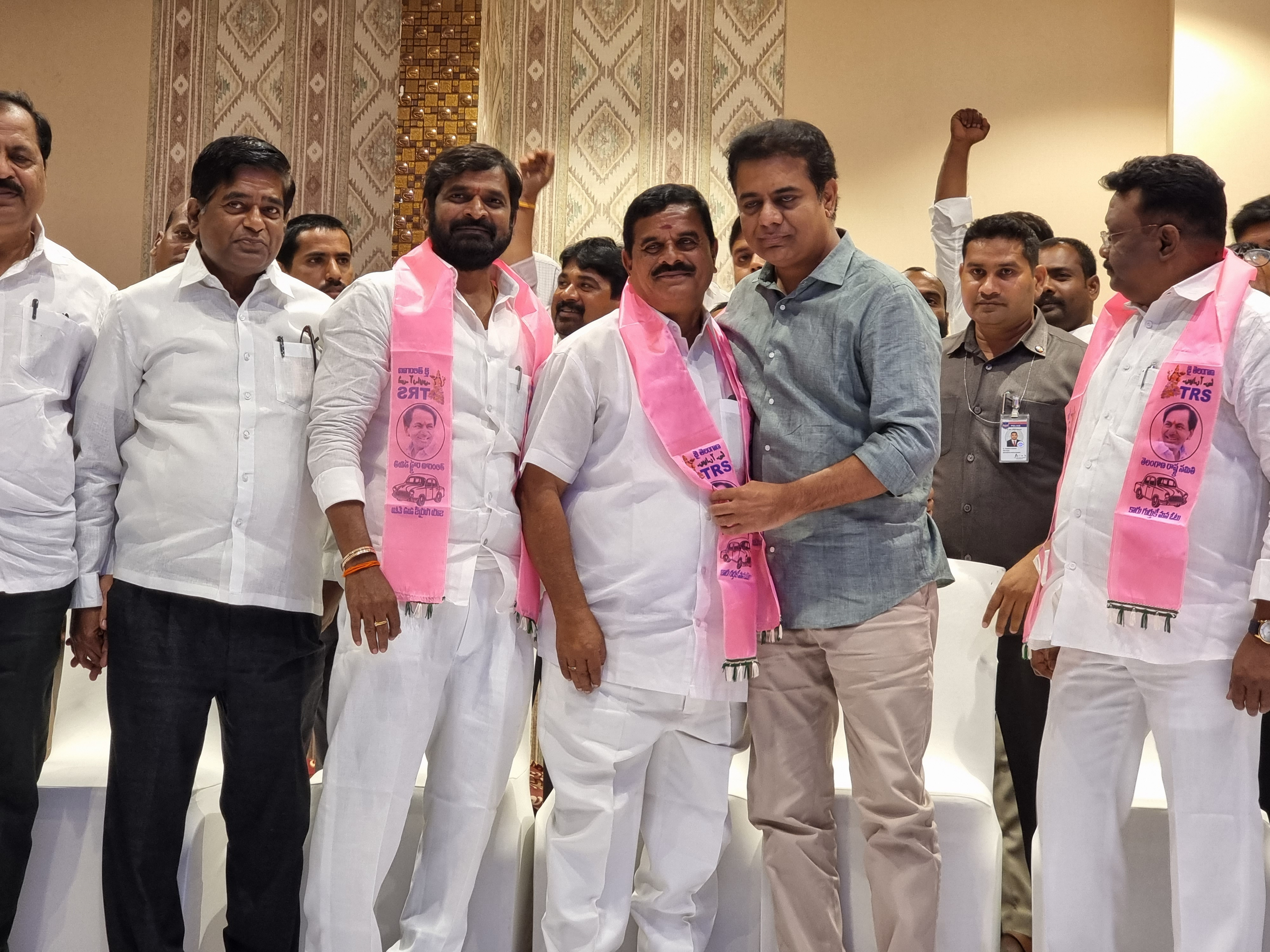
K.Swamy Goud Joined TRS party in the presence of TRS working president K. T. Rama Rao and Minister V. Srinivas Goud at Manneguda

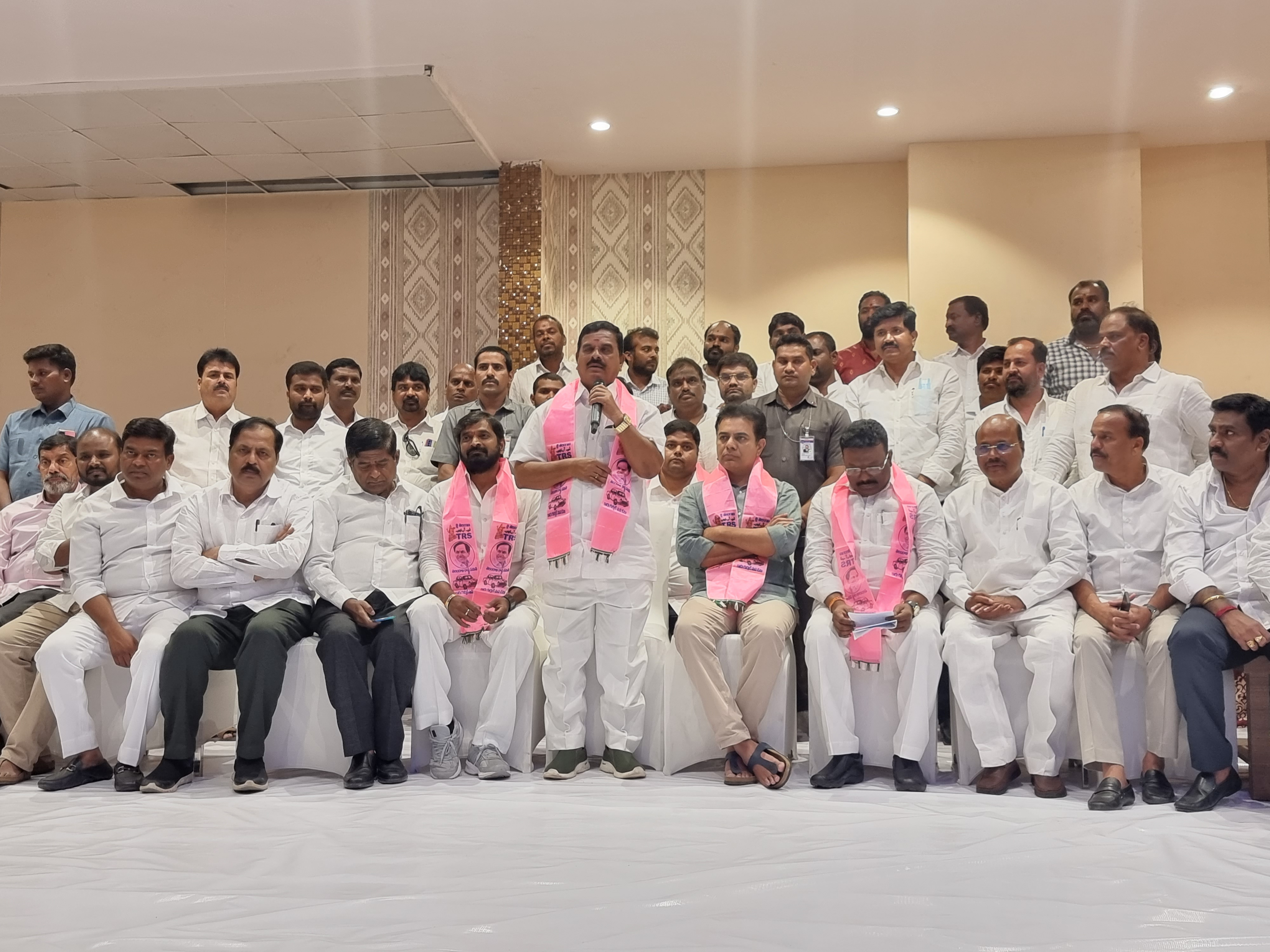
