= B. Mohan Reddy =

Indian politician and academic

Member of Legislative Council

Personal details
- Party: Indian National Congress

B. Mohan Reddy is an Indian politician and academic. He is a Member of Legislative Council in Andhra Pradesh. He belongs to Indian National Congress. He is president of Telangana Teachers' Association and is also associated with Progressive Recognised Teachers Union (PRTU).
