= Nethi Vidya Sagar =

Indian politician

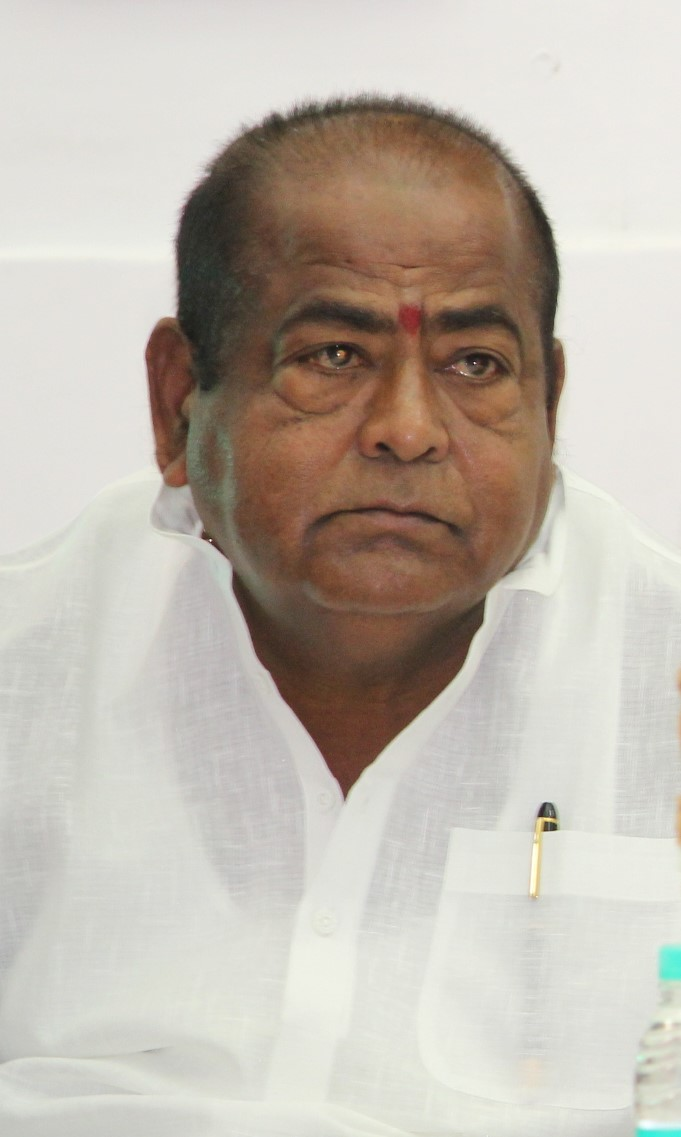

Member of the Telangana Legislative Council
- In office 4 June 2015 – 3 June 2021

1st Deputy Chairman of Telangana Legislative Council
- In office 02 June 2014 – 4 June 2021
- Preceded by: Office Established
- Succeeded by: Banda Prakash

Personal details
- Born: 29 June 1956 (age 69) Cherukupally
- Party: Indian National Congress(2023-Present)

Bikshamaiah Nethi Vidya Sagar is an Indian politician who served as the 1st Deputy Chairman of Telangana Legislative Council from 2 June 2014 to 4 June 2021. He was the Member of Legislative Council from Nalgonda.

== Career ==
He was first elected to the council in 2007 and reelected in 2009.
