= Naradasu Laxman Rao =

Indian politician

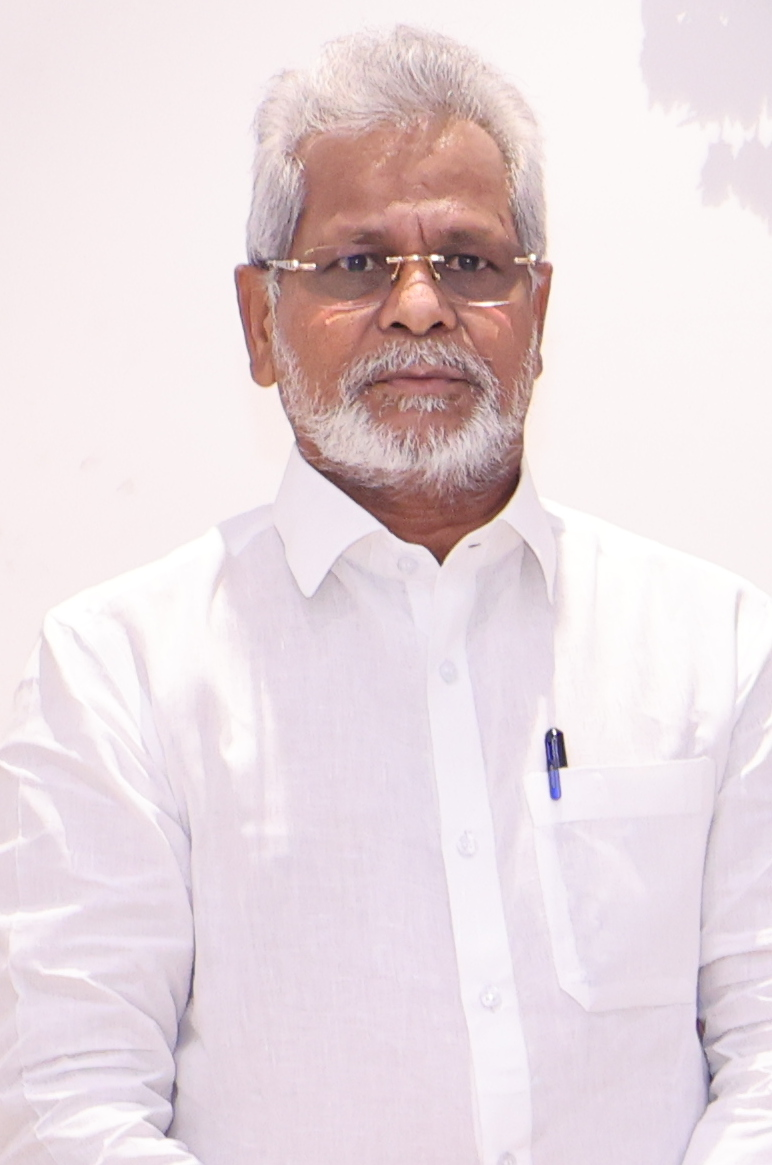

Member of Legislative Council

Personal details
- Born: 15 September 1955 (age 70)
- Party: Telangana Rashtra Samithi

Naradasu Laxman Rao is an Indian politician and a Member of Legislative Council in Telangana. He belongs to Telangana Rashtra Samithi. He is an MLC from Karimnagar. He produced one film which won Nandi Award for Best Film on National Integration - Vimukti Kosam (1983)
