= Banda Prakash =

Indian politician

Banda Prakash Mudiraj
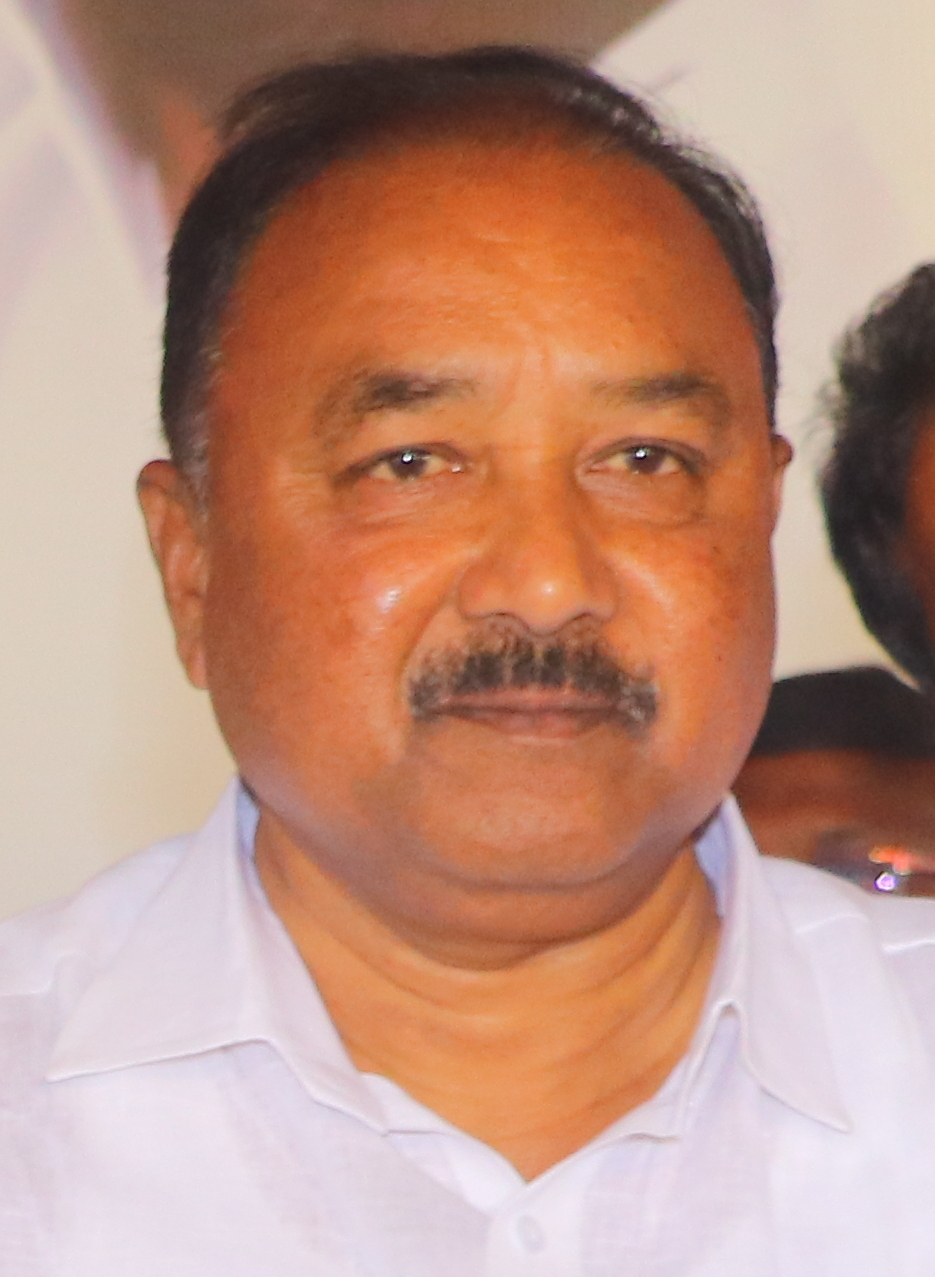

Deputy Chair of the Telangana Legislative Council
- Incumbent
- Assumed office 12 February 2023
- Governor: • Tamilisai Soundararajan; •C.P. Radhakrishnan (additional charge); •Jishnu Dev Varma
- Leader of the House: ▪︎ K. Chandrashekar Rao; ▪︎ Revanth Reddy
- Chair: Gutha Sukender Reddy
- Preceded by: Nethi Vidya Sagar

Member of Legislative Council Telangana
- Incumbent
- Assumed office 22 November 2021
- Constituency: Elected by MLAs

Member of Parliament, Rajya Sabha
- In office 3 April 2018 – 4 December 2021
- Preceded by: Palvai Govardhan Reddy, INC
- Succeeded by: Vaddiraju Ravi Chandra, BRS
- Constituency: Telangana

Personal details
- Born: Warangal
- Party: Bharat Rashtra Samithi

Banda Prakash Mudiraj (born 1954) is an Indian politician who is currently Deputy Chair of the Telangana Legislative Council from 12 February 2023. Also He is the Member of Telangana Legislative Council from 22 November 2021. Earlier he served as Member of Parliament in Rajya Sabha representing Telangana from 23 March 2018 to 4 December 2021. He won the voting with 33 votes. He is the President of Telangana Mudiraj Mahasabha. He belongs to Bharat Rashtra Samithi in Telangana.

Banda Prakash was unanimously elected as Deputy Chair of the Telangana Legislative Council on 12 February 2023.

== Life ==
Banda Prakash was born to Banda Satyanarayana in Warangal district in Telangana. He did his Ph.D. from Kakatiya University in 1996.

== Election History ==
=== Rajya Sabha ===
Position	Party	Constituency	From	To	Tenure
Member of Parliament, Rajya Sabha (1st Term)	TRS	Telangana	3 April 2018	4 December 2021	3 years, 245 days
