= JJM Medical College =

Indian medical college

- Jagadguru Jayadeva Murugarajendra Medical College
- Type: Private medical college
- Established: 1965
- Affiliations: Rajiv Gandhi University of Health Sciences
- Location: Davangere, Karnataka, India; 14°27′18″N 75°54′56″E
- Website: www.jjmmc.org

J. J. M. Medical College (JJMMC), formally known as Jagadguru Jayadeva Murugarajendra Medical College, is a private medical college located in Davangere, Karnataka, India. Established in 1965 by the Bapuji Educational Association, the institution is affiliated with the Rajiv Gandhi University of Health Sciences (RGUHS) and recognised by the National Medical Commission (NMC).

For clinical training, students and interns from JJMMC have been posted at both Bapuji Hospital and government hospitals in Davangere, including Chigateri General Hospital. During the COVID-19 pandemic in India, JJMMC postgraduate students and interns were among medical personnel deployed at Chigateri Hospital.

== History ==
The Bapuji Educational Association (BEA) was established in 1958 by a group of philanthropists in Davangere to expand educational opportunities in the region. J.J.M. Medical College was subsequently established by the association in 1965, with permission from the Government of Mysore (now Karnataka), the Medical Council of India, and the Government of India. The college received its first Letter of Permission for the MBBS course on 22 October 1965, with an approved initial intake of 300 students.

Upon its inception, the college was affiliated with the University of Mysore. It operated under this affiliation until 1987, the same year it received formal recognition from the Medical Council of India. Postgraduate qualifications in orthopaedics were subsequently granted under Kuvempu University. The institution is currently affiliated with the Rajiv Gandhi University of Health Sciences (RGUHS).

== Campus and teaching hospitals ==
The college campus is located in Davangere and includes clinical facilities across two major teaching hospitals: Bapuji Hospital and the government-run Chigateri General Hospital, which together provide over 1,700 teaching beds. For clinical training, students and interns from JJMMC are posted at both hospitals. During the COVID-19 pandemic in India, JJMMC postgraduate residents and interns were among the medical personnel deployed at Chigateri General Hospital.

== Academics ==
JJMMC offers the undergraduate Bachelor of Medicine, Bachelor of Surgery (MBBS) degree course with an approved annual intake of 245 students recognised by the National Medical Commission. Admission to the MBBS program is conducted through the National Eligibility cum Entrance Test (Undergraduate) (NEET-UG). The college also offers postgraduate degrees, including Doctor of Medicine (MD), Master of Surgery (MS), and medical diploma programs across various clinical disciplines.

== Notable alumni ==
- H. C. Mahadevappa - politician and former minister in the Government of Karnataka; completed his MBBS at JJM Medical College, Davangere, in 1999.
- K. S. Gopinath – surgical oncologist and recipient of the Padma Shri; completed his MBBS at JJM Medical College in 1975.
- K. R. Palaniswamy - gastroenterologist and medical academic; graduated in medicine from JJM Medical College, Davangere, in 1972, and was awarded the Padma Shri in 2007 and the Padma Bhushan in 2026.
- M. Sanjay Kumar - ophthalmologist and politician who represents Jagtial Assembly constituency in the Telangana Legislative Assembly; completed his postgraduate training in ophthalmology at JJM Medical College, Davanagere, in 1992.
- M. Srinivas - paediatric surgeon and former Director of the All India Institute of Medical Sciences, New Delhi; completed his postgraduate training in surgery at JJM Medical College, Davangere, before obtaining an M.Ch. in paediatric surgery from AIIMS, New Delhi.
- Mukku Ugra Narasimha Reddy - politician and Member of the Andhra Pradesh Legislative Assembly from Kanigiri Assembly constituency; completed his MBBS at JJM Medical College, Davangere, in 2000.
- Sathi Suryanarayana Reddy - politician and former Member of the Andhra Pradesh Legislative Assembly; completed his MS in general surgery at JJM Medical College in 1991.
- Suresh Hanagavadi - physician and professor of pathology; completed his MBBS at JJM Medical College, Davangere, and received the Padma Shri in 2026 for his work in haemophilia care and patient advocacy.
- Deeksha C Mudadevannanavar - Medical officer in the Indian army

== See also ==
- List of medical colleges in India
- Healthcare in India
