= T. Jeevan Reddy =

Indian politician (born 1951)

Tatiparthi Jeevan Reddy
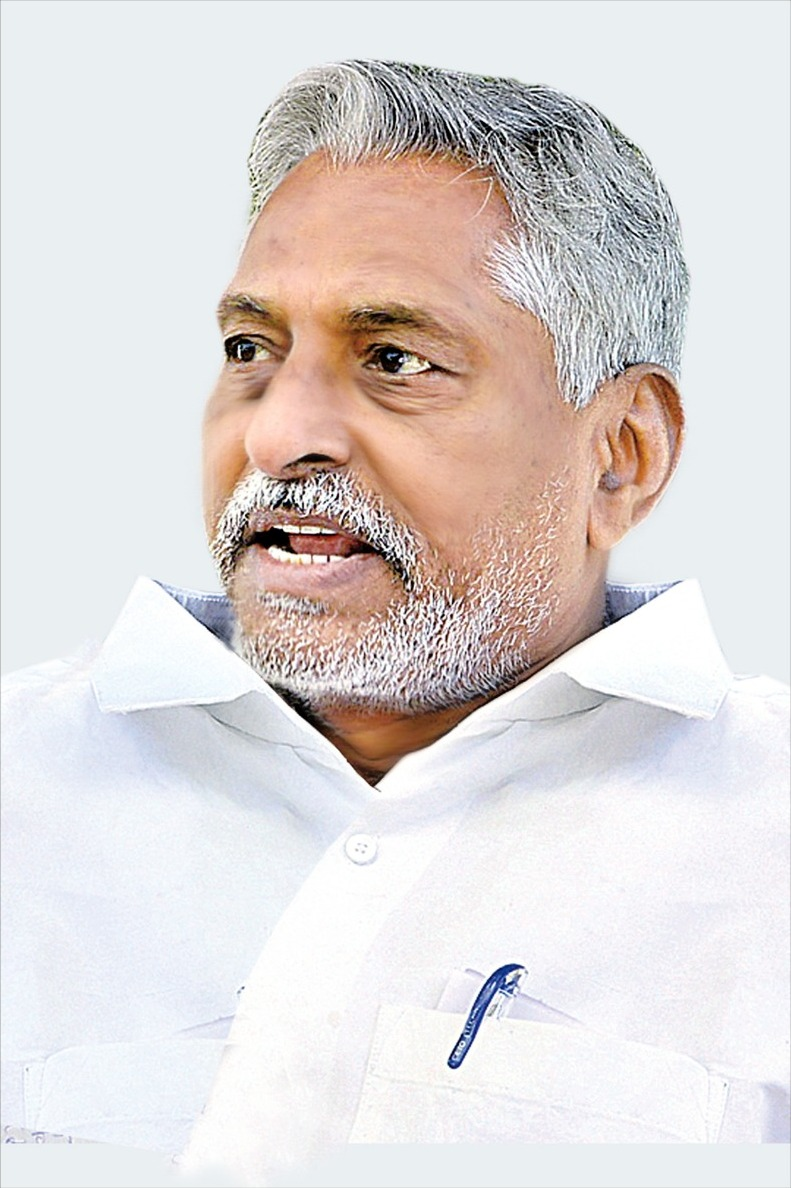

Member of Telangana Legislative Council
- In office 30 March 2019 – 29 March 2025
- Chairman: Swamy Goud; Gutha Sukender Reddy
- Deputy Chairman: Nethi Vidya Sagar; Banda Prakash
- Leader of the House: K. Chandrashekar Rao; Anumula Revanth Reddy
- Constituency: Medak–Nizamabad–Adilabad–Karimnagar Graduates

Member of Telangana Legislative Assembly
- In office 2 June 2014 – 11 December 2018
- Preceded by: Telangana Assembly Created
- Succeeded by: M. Sanjay Kumar
- Constituency: Jagtial

Minister of Roads & Buildings Government of Andhra Pradesh
- In office 26 April 2007 – 20 May 2009
- Governor: Rameshwar Thakur; N. D. Tiwari
- Chief Minister: Y. S. Rajasekhara Reddy
- Preceded by: A. Chandra Shekar
- Succeeded by: Galla Aruna Kumari

Minister of Excise, Distilleries and Molasses Control Government of Andhra Pradesh
- In office 9 January 1983 – 16 September 1984
- Governor: K. C. Abraham; Thakur Ramlal; Shankar Dayal Sharma
- Chief Minister: N. T. Rama Rao; Nadendla Bhaskara Rao
- Preceded by: M. M. Hashim; Y. S. Rajasekhara Reddy
- Succeeded by: Ashok Gajapathi Raju

Member of Andhra Pradesh Legislative Assembly
- In office 1996–2009
- Preceded by: L. Ramana
- Succeeded by: L. Ramana
- Constituency: Jagtial
- In office 1989–1994
- Preceded by: G. Rajesham Goud
- Succeeded by: L. Ramana
- Constituency: Jagtial
- In office 1983–1985
- Preceded by: Deverakonda Surender Rao
- Succeeded by: Godisela Rajesham Gowd
- Constituency: Jagtial

Personal details
- Born: 5 January 1951 (age 75) Bathkepally, Hyderabad State, India (now Jagtial district, Telangana State, India)
- Party: Bharat Rashtra Samithi (20 April 2026 - Incumbent)
- Other political affiliations: Telugu Desam Party; Indian National Congress (Till 25 March 2026)
- Occupation: Politician and Advocate

Tatiparthi Jeevan Reddy is an Indian politician who served as the Cabinet Minister in United Andhra Pradesh in NTR I and YSR I ministries. He was elected as a Member of the Telangana Legislative Assembly after the formation of Telangana in 2014. He served as a member of the Telangana Legislative Council from the Medak–Nizamabad–Adilabad–Karimnagar Graduates constituency between 2019 and 2025. He was elected six times to the Legislative Assembly.

He was first elected as Panchayat Samithi President of Mallial in 1981 in non-party-based elections, equivalent to today's legislative constituency. He was elected as MLA for the first time from the Telugu Desam Party in 1983 and was inducted into the state cabinet with an Excise Minister portfolio. He later differed with N. T. Rama Rao and joined the Indian National Congress under the leadership of Rajiv Gandhi in the year 1984. He won the elections from the Congress Party in 1989, 1996, 1999, 2004 and 2014. In 2019, he was elected as a Member of the Legislative Council (Graduate) from Karimnagar Assembly constituency with a majority of (39,430) votes.

Reddy contested against the Bharat Rashtra Samithi President in the 2006 and 2008 Parliamentary by-election. In the 2008 Parliamentary elections, he lost marginally with 14,000 votes only. In 2006, he was inducted into the State Cabinet until 2009, during which he held the portfolio of R&B. After the formation of Telangana State, he won the only seat from North Telangana for the Congress.

Jeevan Reddy tendered his resignation to Congress party’s primary membership as well as AICC membership citing discontent over defections and neglect of senior members, ending 42-year party association on 25 March 2026.

Jeevan Reddy Joined Bharat Rashtra Samithi on 20 April 2026 in the presence of party President and Ex Chief Minister K. Chandrashekar Rao at the Praja Ashirvada Sabha held in Jagtial.

== Electoral history ==
Year	Constituency	Party	Votes	Opponent		Result	Margin
1983	Jagtial	TDP	56,898	INC	Juvvadi Ratnakar Rao	Won	31,532
1985	Jagtial	INC	35,420	TDP	Godisela Rajesham Gowd	Lost	-13,450
1989	Jagtial	INC	62,315	TDP	Godisela Rajesham Gowd	Won	19,250
1994	Jagtial	INC	45,610	TDP	L. Ramana	Lost	-5,646
1996 (By-el.)	Jagtial	INC	83,291	TDP	Bandari Venugopal	Won	53,910
1999	Jagtial	INC	65,486	TDP	L. Ramana	Won	16,912
2004	Jagtial	INC	63,812	TDP	L. Ramana	Won	8,134
2006 (By-el.)	Karimnagar	INC	171,023	TRS	K. Chandrashekar Rao	Lost	-201,582
2008 (By-el.)	Karimnagar	INC	255,876	TRS	K. Chandrashekar Rao	Lost	-15,701
2009	Jagtial	INC	43,415	TDP	L. Ramana	Lost	-29,849
2014	Jagtial	INC	62,531	TRS	M. Sanjay Kumar	Won	7,828
2018	Jagtial	INC	43,062	TRS	M. Sanjay Kumar	Lost	-61,185
2019 (MLC)	Medak–Nizamabad–Adilabad–Karimnagar Graduates	INC	68,430	IND	Chandrasekhar Goud	Won	39,430
2023	Jagtial	INC	54,421	BRS	M. Sanjay Kumar	Lost	-15,822
2024	Nizamabad	INC	483,077	BJP	Dharmapuri Arvind	Lost	-109,241

== Minister in old Andhra Pradesh ==
He was the Roads and Buildings Minister of Andhra Pradesh from 2007 to 2009. He was a senior member of the Congress Party.

== Career ==
Jeevan Reddy was elected as an MLA six times consecutively from Jagityal constituency and was defeated by L. Ramana of the Telugu Desam Party in the 2009 elections.

In 2006 and 2008, he lost the Karimnagar by-election to TRS leader K. Chandrashekhar Rao. In the 2019 elections, he was elected as the legislative council (MLC) member for the graduates' constituency, Karimnagar.

Member of Legislative Assembly

Duration	Constituency	Political party
1983–1985	Jagtial	TDP
1989–1994	Jagtial	INC
1996–1999	Jagtial	INC
1999–2004	Jagtial	INC
2004–2009	Jagtial	INC
2014–2018	Jagtial	INC

S.No.	Year	Election Type	Constituency / Post	Candidate	Party	Result	Main Opponent	Opponent Party
1	1983	Assembly Election	Jagtial	T. Jeevan Reddy	Telugu Desam Party	Won	Juvvadi Ratnakar Rao	Indian National Congress
2	1985	Assembly Election	Jagtial	T. Jeevan Reddy	Indian National Congress	Lost	Godisela Rajesham Goud	Telugu Desam Party
3	1989	Assembly Election	Jagtial	T. Jeevan Reddy	Indian National Congress	Won	Godisela Rajesham Goud	Telugu Desam Party
4	1994	Assembly Election	Jagtial	T. Jeevan Reddy	Indian National Congress	Lost	L. Ramana	Telugu Desam Party
5	1996 (By-poll)	Assembly By-Election	Jagtial	T. Jeevan Reddy	Indian National Congress	Won	L. Ramana	Telugu Desam Party
6	1999	Assembly Election	Jagtial	T. Jeevan Reddy	Indian National Congress	Won	L. Ramana	Telugu Desam Party
7	2004	Assembly Election	Jagtial	T. Jeevan Reddy	Indian National Congress	Won	L. Ramana	Telugu Desam Party
8	2006 (By-poll)	Lok Sabha By-Election	Karimnagar	T. Jeevan Reddy	Indian National Congress	Lost	K. Chandrashekar Rao	TRS
9	2008 (By-poll)	Lok Sabha By-Election	Karimnagar	T. Jeevan Reddy	Indian National Congress	Lost	K. Chandrashekar Rao	TRS
10	2009	Assembly Election	Jagtial	T. Jeevan Reddy	Indian National Congress	Lost	L. Ramana	Telugu Desam Party
11	2014	Assembly Election	Jagtial	T. Jeevan Reddy	Indian National Congress	Won	Dr. M. Sanjay Kumar	TRS
12	2018	Assembly Election	Jagtial	T. Jeevan Reddy	Indian National Congress	Lost	Dr. M. Sanjay Kumar	TRS
13	2019	MLC Election (Graduates)	Medak–Nizamabad–Adilabad–Karimnagar Graduates	T. Jeevan Reddy	Indian National Congress	Won	Chandrashekhar Goud	Independent (TRS Backed)
14	2023	Assembly Election	Jagtial	T. Jeevan Reddy	Indian National Congress	Lost	Dr. M. Sanjay Kumar	BRS
15	2024	Lok Sabha Election	Nizamabad	T. Jeevan Reddy	Indian National Congress	Lost	Dharmapuri Arvind	Bharatiya Janata Party
