= G. Rajesham Goud =

Indian politician

Godisela Rajesham Goud
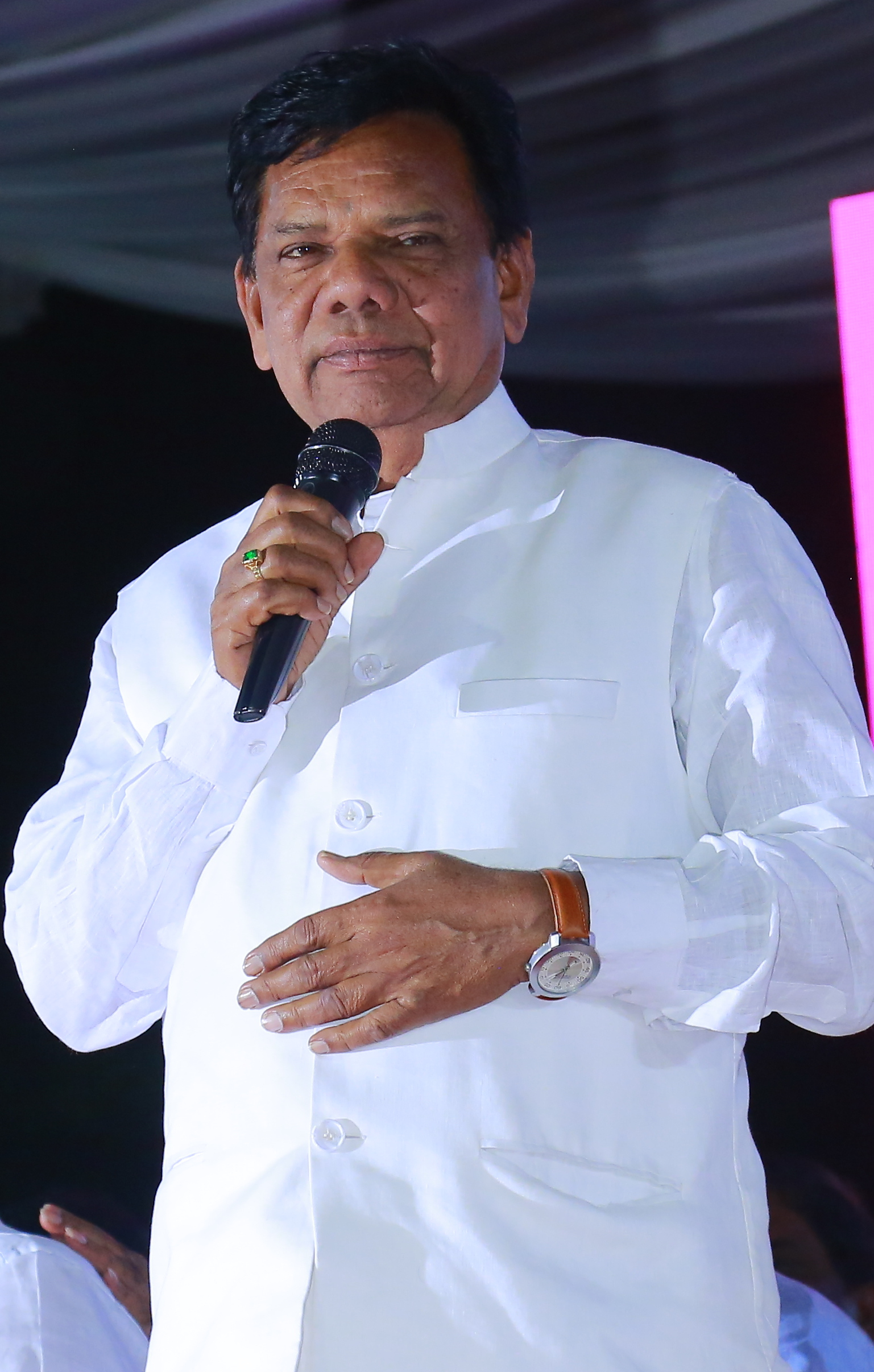

Chairman Telangana State Finance Commission
- In office 29 December 2017 – 2023

Minister of Law

Member of Andhra Pradesh Legislative Assembly
- In office 1985–1989
- Preceded by: T. Jeevan Reddy
- Succeeded by: T. Jeevan Reddy
- Constituency: Jagtial

Personal details
- Born: Antargaon, Jagtial, Karimnagar, Telangana
- Party: Bharat Rashtra Samithi
- Other political affiliations: Telugu Desam Party

Godisela Rajesham Goud is an Indian politician in the state of Telangana. He was served as Law Minister in united Andhra Pradesh, and later served as the first chairman for Telangana State Finance Commission, constituted in 2017.

== Political career ==
Rajesham Goud started his political journey with Telugu Desam Party and first elected as ZPTC and served as Karimnagar Zila Parishad Chairman. He was elected as a member of the legislative assembly from Jagtial constituency in 1985 and inducted as minister for Law in NTR's cabinet.

== Elections contested ==
Election results
Election	Constituency	Party	Opponent	Majority	Result
1985	Jagtial	TDP	T. Jeevan Reddy (INC)	15,122	Won
1989	Jagtial	TDP	T. Jeevan Reddy (INC)	31,786	Lost
