= Govindpalle =

- village
- Country: India
- State: Telangana

Languages
  - Official: Telugu
- Time zone: UTC+5:30 (IST)
- Vehicle registration: TS
- Website: telangana.gov.in

Govindpalle is a small village on the outskirts of Jagtial town, Karimnagar district, Telangana, India.
