= Rajarampalli =

Rajarampalli is a village in Endapalli Mandal in Jagityal District of Telangana State, India. It belongs to Telangana region. It is located 25 kilometres (16 mi) north of the district headquarters, Jagityal. The local language is Telugu.
