= L. Ramana =

Indian politician

Lgandula Ramana
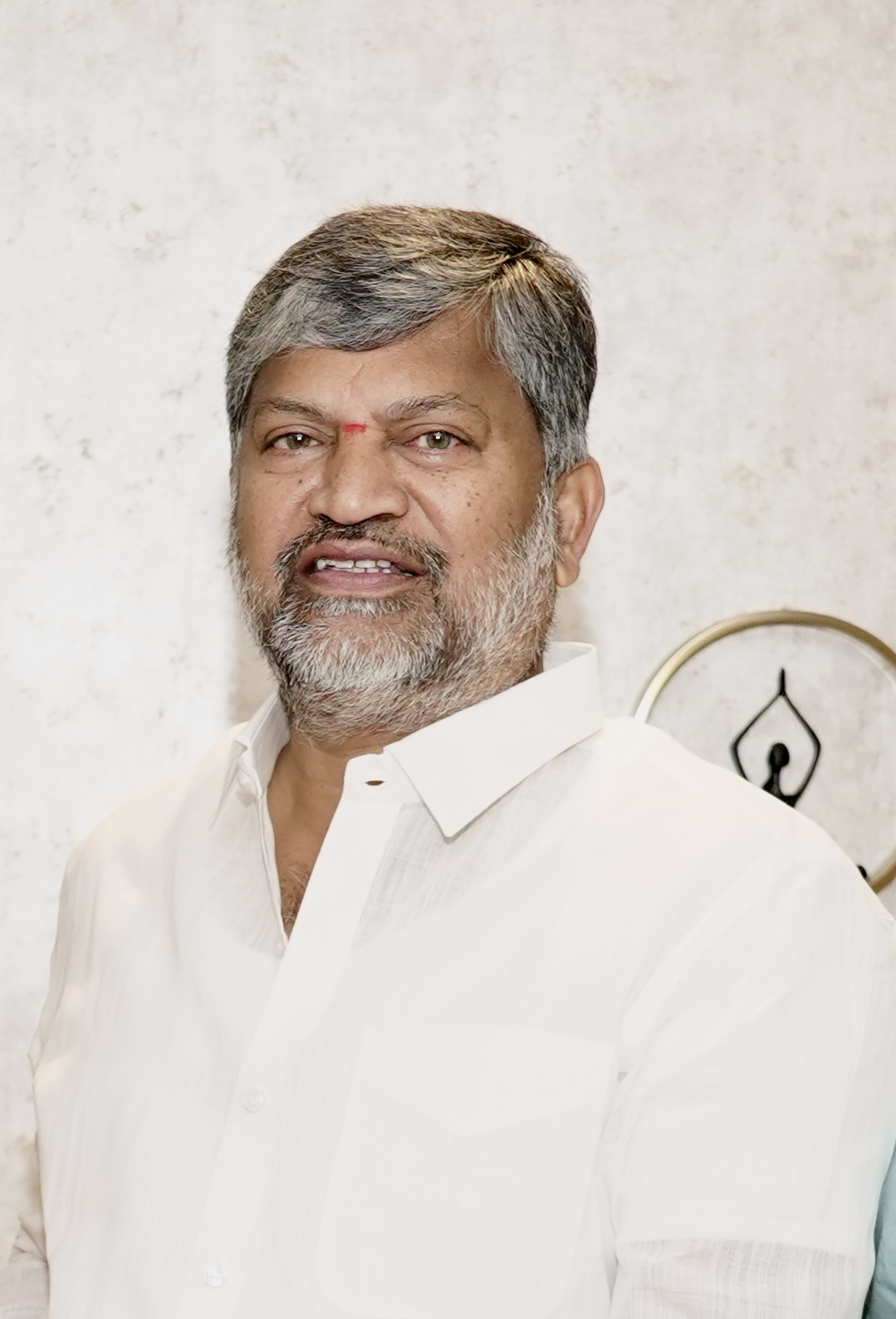

Member of Telangana Legislative Council
- Incumbent
- Assumed office 2021
- Constituency: Local Authorities Karimnagar

Member of Andhra Pradesh Legislative Assembly
- In office 1994–1996
- Preceded by: T. Jeevan Reddy
- Succeeded by: T. Jeevan Reddy
- Constituency: Jagtial
- In office 2009–2014
- Preceded by: T. Jeevan Reddy
- Succeeded by: M. Sanjay Kumar
- Constituency: Jagtial

1st President of Telugu Desam Party Telangana unit
- In office 30 September 2015 – 9 July 2021
- National President: N. Chandrababu Naidu
- Preceded by: Position established
- Succeeded by: Bakkani Narasimhulu

Personal details
- Born: 4 September 1961 (age 65) Jagtial, Karimnagar, Telangana
- Party: Bharat Rashtra Samithi (since 2021)
- Other political affiliations: Telugu Desam Party (until 2021)
- Spouse: Sandhya (m. 1990)
- Children: L.Manikanta, L.Karthikeya

Lgandula Ramana, popularly known as L. Ramana, was born on 4 September 1961 in Jagtial. He is EX President of Telugu Desam Party (TDP) for Telangana state. He is the son of Ganga Ram. Lgandula Ramana is a Bharat Rashtra Samithi politician from Karimnagar.

== Electoral history ==
Year	Constituency	Party	Votes	Opponent		Result	Margin
1994	Jagtial	TDP	51,256	INC	T. Jeevan Reddy	Won	5,646
1996	Karimnagar	TDP	235,343	INC	J. Chokka Rao	Won	51,761
1998	Karimnagar	TDP	233,033	BJP	C. Vidyasagar Rao	Lost	-95,997
1999	Jagtial	TDP	48,574	INC	T. Jeevan Reddy	Lost	-16,912
2004	Jagtial	TDP	55,678	INC	T. Jeevan Reddy	Lost	-8,134
2006 (By-election)	Karimnagar	TDP	170,268	TRS	K. Chandrashekar Rao	Lost	-207,762
2008 (By-election)	Karimnagar	TDP	173,400	TRS	K. Chandrashekar Rao	Lost	-96,052
2009	Jagtial	TDP	73,264	INC	T. Jeevan Reddy	Won	29,849
2014	Jagtial	TDP	22,385	INC	T. Jeevan Reddy	Lost	-40,231
2021 (MLC)	Mahabubnagar–Ranga Reddy–Hyderabad Graduates	TDP	4,656	TRS	Surabhi Vani Devi	Lost	—
2021 (MLC)	Karimnagar Local Authorities	TRS	479	IND	Sarabudla Prabhakar Reddy	Won	476

== Personal life ==
He is a graduate with a Bachelor of Science from SKNR Degree College (1978–81). He is a politician and social worker by profession. He was married to Sandhya on 8 August 1990. He has two

== Positions held ==
- Member of Legislative Assembly AP (2009–2014)
- A.P. Khadi Village Industries Board Chairman
- Member of Parliament, Lok Sabha (11th) - 1996-98
- Member of AP Legislative Assembly - 1994-96
- Minister of Handlooms and Textiles - 1994-96
- Former President of Telangana Telugu Desam Party
- Member of Telangana Legislative Council - Present
