= Bathkepally =

Bathikepelly
- Village
- Location in Telangana, India
- Coordinates: 18.732505°N 79.041666°E
- Country: India
- State: Telangana
- District: Jagityal
- Assembly constituency: Dharmapuri
- PIN: 505532
- Area code: 08724

Bathikepelly (also Bathkepally, Bathikepally or Bathkapalli) is a village located in Pegadapally mandal, in the Jagtial district of Telangana state. Prior to the formation of Telangana, the village was part of Karimnagar district in Andhra Pradesh.

There is a Legal Care and Support Centre in the village in the village operated by the Telangana State Legal Services Authority.

== Transport ==
Bathikepelly is located 52 kilometres from Karimnagar, 4 kilometres from Mandal Pegadapally, 18 kilometres from Jagityal, and 14 kilometres from Mallial.

== Education ==
The village has one government school named Z.P. High School (Bathkepally), and few other private high-schools.
