= Kasani Gnaneshwar Mudiraj =

Indian politician

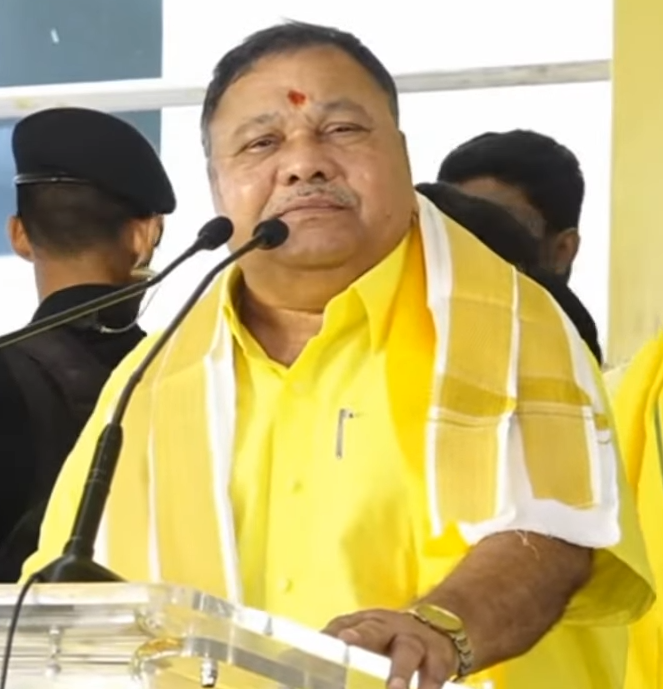
- Gnaneshwar Mudiraj at oath ceremony

3rd President of Telugu Desam Party Telangana unit
- In office 10 November 2022 – 30 October 2023
- National President: N. Chandrababu Naidu
- Preceded by: Bakkani Narasimhulu
- Succeeded by: Vacant

Member of Legislative Council, Andhra Pradesh
- In office 2007–2011

President of Mana Party
- In office August 2007 – 2022
- Preceded by: Position established
- Succeeded by: Dissolved

Personal details
- Born: 19 August 1954 (age 72) Bachupally
- Party: Bharat Rashtra Samithi (since 2023)
- Other political affiliations: Indian National Congress (until 2022); Mana Party (2007); Telugu Desam Party (until 2006; 2022–2023)
- Spouse: Kasani Chandrakala

Kasani Gnaneshwar Mudiraj (born 19 August 1954) is an Indian politician, who served as Member of Legislative Council, representing the Indian state Andhra Pradesh from 2007 to 2011. He was appointed as the State President of Telugu Desam Party for the Telangana unit by former chief minister N. Chandrababu Naidu in November 2022.

Kasani Gnaneshwar also serves as the National President of Mudiraj Mahasabha and is often considered a strong leader of the BC community. He was the president of Mana Party, which was founded by him in 2007.

== Electoral history ==
Year	Constituency	Party	Votes	%	Opponent	Party	Votes	%	Result	Margin	%
1999	Chevella	IND	19,890	16.24	P. Indra Reddy	INC	56,342	46.00	Lost	-36,452	-29.76
2007 (Note: Elected by Local Authorities)	Ranga Reddy Local Authorities (MLC)	IND	—	—	—	INC	—	—	Won	—	—
2009	Quthbullapur	MANP	23,430	14.87	Kuna Srisailam Goud	IND	56,809	36.05	Lost	-33,379	-21.18
2009	Chevella (MP)	MANP	19,996	1.84	Jaipal Reddy	INC	4,20,807	38.78	Lost	-4,00,811	-36.94
2018	Secunderabad	INC	33,839	25.68	T. Padma Rao Goud	TRS	79,309	60.18	Lost	-45,470	-34.50
2024	Chevella (MP)	BRS	1,78,968	10.68	Konda Vishweshwar Reddy	BJP	8,09,882	48.34	Lost	-6,30,914	-37.66

== Career ==
He served as chairman of Ranga Reddy Zila Parishad representing Telugu Desam Party from 2001 to 2006.

In 2007, Gnaneshwar was elected to Andhra Pradesh Legislative Council from the Assembly quota as an independent supported by ten Bharat Rashtra Samithi rebel MLAs.

He resigned from Telugu Desam Party (TDP), following differences with another party leader Tulla Devender Goud. In August 2007, he launched his own political party, named Mana Party, which claims to be representative of over 90 BC castes in Andhra Pradesh.

In 2009, he unsuccessfully contested the assembly election from Quthbullapur constituency, gained 23430 votes for Mana Party. Later, he entered into an alliance with Chiranjeevi's Praja Rajyam Party and contested 2009 general election from Chevella (Lok Sabha constituency), received 19996 votes. He is Prajakutami candidate in 2018 Telangana Legislative Assembly election, contesting on the Indian National Congress ticket from Secunderabad (Assembly constituency) and lost the election.

In 2022, he again joined back into the Telugu Desam Party in the presence of the party president and former Chief Minister of Andhra Pradesh, N. Chandrababu Naidu. On November 4, 2022, Kasani was appointed as the President of the Telugu Desam Party (TDP), Telangana unit. He took charge as the president of Telugu Desam Party, Telangana on November 10, 2022.

However again on 30 October 2023, just before the 2023 Telangana polls he resigned from TTDP president post as well as from TDP membership by criticising the decision of TDP supremo Chandra Babu Naidu not to contest the Telangana polls.

=== Positions held ===
Tenure	Position held
2001–2006	Chairman, Zila Parishad, Ranga Reddy District
2007–2011	Member of Andhra Pradesh Legislative Council
1975–1987	Vice-president, Indian Youth Congress
1987–1993	General Secretary, Rangareddy District Youth Congress
1993	Treasurer, Ranga Reddy District Congress Committee
1999	Vice President, Andhra Pradesh Congress Committee Backward Classes
2005	State Vice President, Telugu Desam Party, Andhra Pradesh
2007	National President, Mana Party (India)
2022–2023	President, Telugu Desam Party, Telangana

=== Other ===
He also served as president of Hyderabad Cricket Association and Telangana Kabaddi Association. In April 2017, he was elected as treasurer of All Indian Amateur Kabaddi Federation (AKF). He is serving as the director of International Kabaddi Federation since 2015.

== See also ==
- Andhra Pradesh Legislative Council
- List of people from Telangana
- Mana Party (India)
