= Jagtial Assembly constituency =

Constituency of the Telangana legislative assembly in India

Coordinates: 18.79°N 78.91°E

Jagtial
- Constituency No. 21 for the Telangana Legislative Assembly
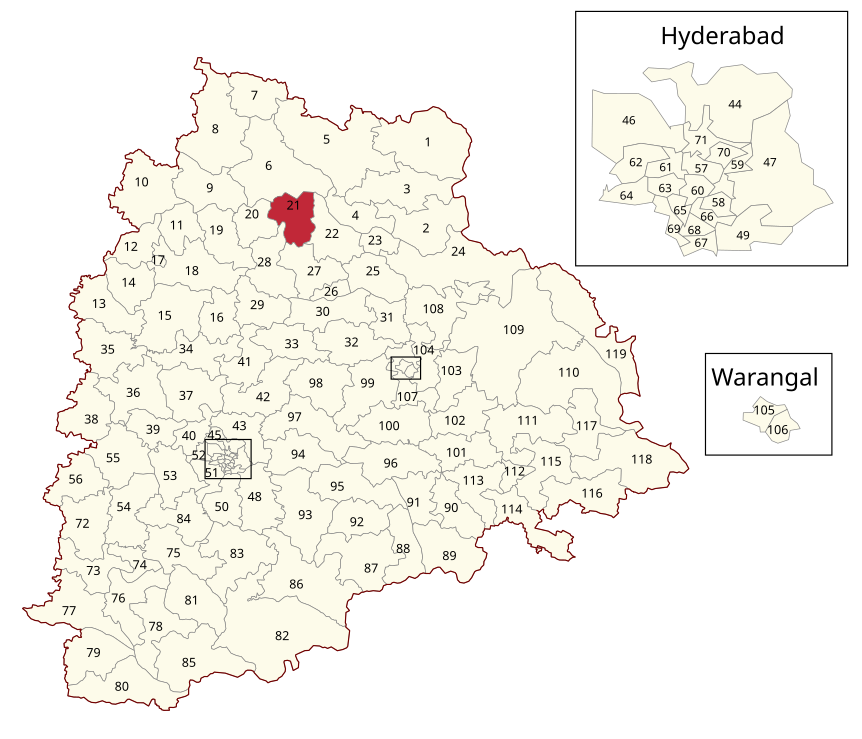
- Location of Jagtial Assembly constituency within Telangana

Constituency details
- Country: India
- Region: South India
- State: Telangana
- District: Jagtial
- Lok Sabha constituency: Nizamabad
- Established: 1951
- Total electors: 1,74,856
- Reservation: None

Member of Legislative Assembly
- 3rd Telangana Legislative Assembly
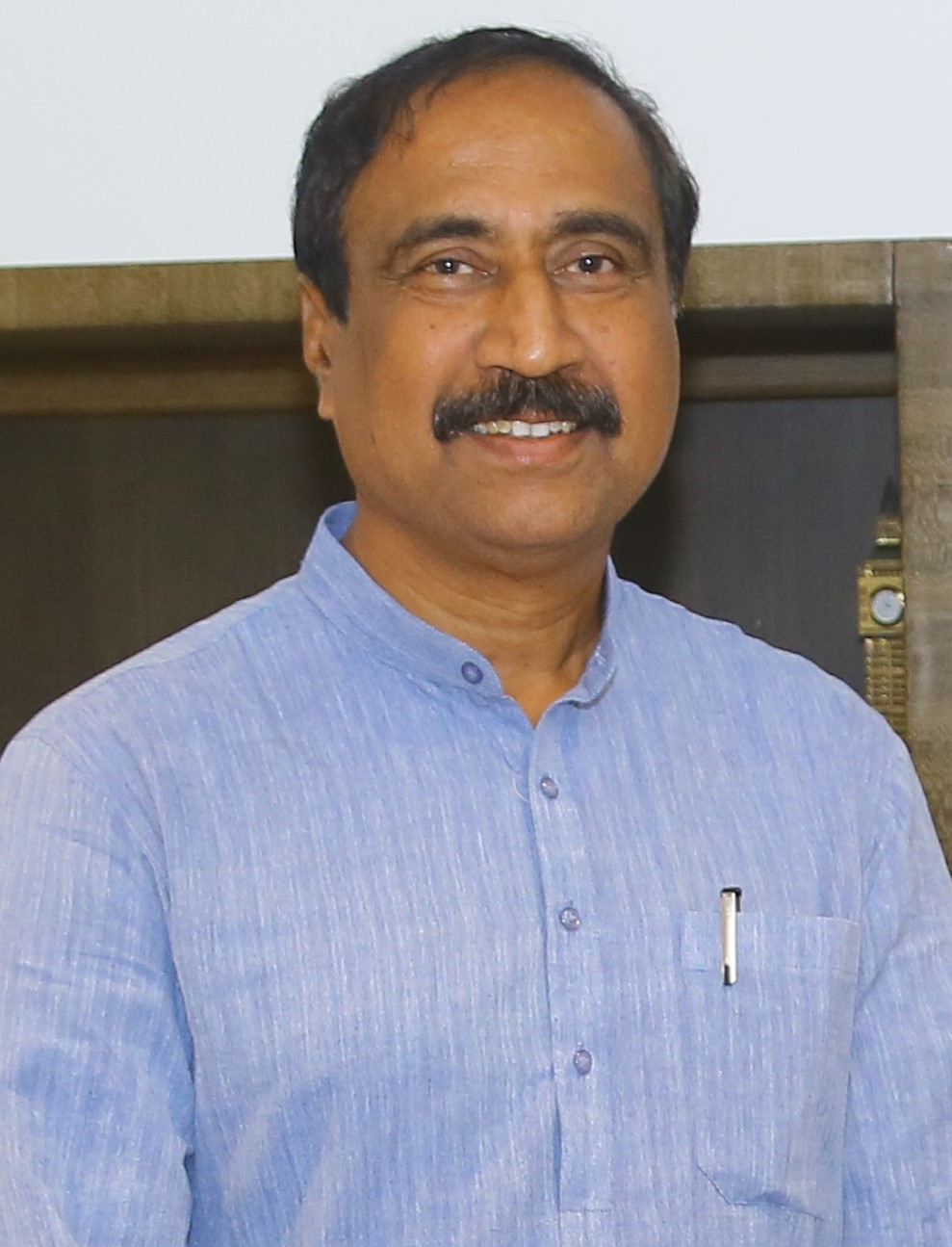
- Incumbent M. Sanjay Kumar
- Party: Indian National Congress
- Elected year: 2024

Jagtial Assembly constituency is a constituency of the Telangana Legislative Assembly, India. It is part of Nizamabad Lok Sabha constituency. M. Sanjay Kumar of [Bharatha Rastra Samithi] is currently representing the constituency.

== Mandals ==
The assembly constituency presently comprises the following mandals:

Mandal
Jagtial
Raikal
Sarangapur
Beerpur

== Members of Legislative Assembly ==
Duration/Term	Member	Political Party
Hyderabad State
1952	Baddam Malla Reddy	Indian National Congress
1952	Butti Rajaram	Indian National Congress
Andhra Pradesh
1957	Devakonda Hanumanth Rao	Indian National Congress
1962	Makunooru Dharma Rao	Indian National Congress
1967	K. L. N. Rao	Indian National Congress
1972	Velichala Jagapathi Rao	Indian National Congress
1978	Deevakonda Surender Rao	Indian National Congress
1983	T. Jeevan Reddy	Telugu Desam Party
1985	G. Rajesham Goud	Telugu Desam Party
1989	T. Jeevan Reddy	Indian National Congress
1994	L. Ramana	Telugu Desam Party
1996^	T. Jeevan Reddy	Indian National Congress
1999	T. Jeevan Reddy	Indian National Congress
2004	T. Jeevan Reddy	Indian National Congress
2009	L. Ramana	Telugu Desam Party
Telangana
2014	T. Jeevan Reddy	Indian National Congress
2018	M. Sanjay Kumar	Telangana Rashtra Samithi
2023	M. Sanjay Kumar	Bharat Rashtra Samithi

== Election results ==
=== 2023 Telangana Legislative Assembly election ===
Telangana Assembly Elections, 2023: Jagtial
Party	Candidate	Votes	%	±%
BRS	M. Sanjay Kumar	70,243	39.83	
INC	T. Jeevan Reddy	54,421	30.86	
BJP	Boga Shravani	42,138	23.89	
NOTA	None of the Above	1,471	0.83	
Majority		15,822	8.97	
Turnout		1,76,359	76.18	
BRS hold		Swing	{{{swing}}}	

=== 2018 Telangana Legislative Assembly election ===
Telangana Assembly Elections, 2018: Jagtial
Party	Candidate	Votes	%	±%
TRS	Dr. M. Sanjay Kumar	104,247	65.27	
INC	T. Jeevan Reddy	43,062	26.96	
BJP	Ravinder Reddy Muduganti	4,817	3.02	
NOTA	None of the Above	1,710	1.07	
Majority		61,185	38.31	
Turnout		1,59,720	78.83	
TRS gain from INC		Swing	{{{swing}}}	

=== 2014 Telangana Legislative Assembly election ===
Telangana Assembly Elections, 2014: Jagtial
Party	Candidate	Votes	%	±%
INC	T. Jeevan Reddy	62,531	42.16	
TRS	Dr. M. Sanjay Kumar	54,788	36.89	
TDP	L. Ramana	22,385	15.07	
Independent	Sabbu Jagan	3,585	2.41	
BSP	Damma Bharathi	1,697	1.14	
NOTA	None of the above	1,020	0.69	
Majority		7,828	5.27	
Turnout		1,48,528	72.01	
INC gain from TDP		Swing	{{{swing}}}	

=== 2009 Andhra Pradesh Legislative Assembly election ===
2009 Andhra Pradesh Legislative Assembly election: Jagtial
Party	Candidate	Votes	%	±%
TDP	L. Ramana	73,264	54.96	
INC	T. Jeevan Reddy	43,415	32.57	
PRP	Dr. Chandra Shekar Goud	9,944	7.46	
Independent	Mohammed Jamaluddin	2,224	1.67	
Pyramid Party of India	Dr. V. Satyanarayana Murthy	1,545	1.16	
LSP	Menneni Vidya Sagar Rao	1,513	1.13	
BSP	Komireddi Karamchand	1,404	1.05	
Majority		29,849	22.39	
Turnout		133,309		

=== 2004 Andhra Pradesh Legislative Assembly election ===
2004 Andhra Pradesh Legislative Assembly election: Jagtial
Party	Candidate	Votes	%	±%
INC	T. Jeevan Reddy	63,812	50.97	
TDP	L. Ramana	55,678	44.47	
Pyramid Party of India	Dr. V. Sathyanarayana Murthy	3,332	2.66	
BSP	Anumalla Bheemaiah	2,371	1.89	
Majority		8,134	6.50	
Turnout		125,193		

=== 1999 Andhra Pradesh Legislative Assembly election ===
1999 Andhra Pradesh Legislative Assembly election: Jagtial
Party	Candidate	Votes	%	±%
INC	T. Jeevan Reddy	65,486	56.89	
TDP	L. Ramana	48,574	42.19	
Akhil Bharatiya TDP	Didge Murali	951	0.83	
Independent	Kondu Srinivas Rao	107	0.09	
Majority		16,912	14.70	
Turnout		115,118		

=== 1996 Jagtial Assembly by-election ===
1996 Andhra Pradesh Legislative Assembly by-election: Jagtial
Party	Candidate	Votes	%	±%
INC	T. Jeevan Reddy	83,291	70.98	
TDP	Bandari Venugopal	29,381	25.04	
NTR Telugu Desam Party (LP)	Banda Bhasker Reddy	1,814	1.55	
BSP	Anumalla Bheemaiah	1,772	1.51	
Independent	P. Gangadhar	352	0.30	
Independent	B. David	349	0.30	
Bahujan Republican Party	Thota Bala Mallaiah	279	0.24	
Independent	L. Chandrshekhar	92	0.08	
Majority		53,910	45.94	
Turnout		119,093		
INC hold		Swing	{{{swing}}}	

=== 1994 Andhra Pradesh Legislative Assembly election ===
1994 Andhra Pradesh Legislative Assembly election: Jagtial
Party	Candidate	Votes	%	±%
TDP	L. Ramana	51,256	48.33	
INC	T. Jeevan Reddy	45,610	43.01	
BJP	Rachakonda Sri Ramulu	3,373	3.18	
Independent	Agurula Uma	1,781	1.68	
BSP	Ette Surender	1,580	1.49	
Independent	Ette Prabhakar	569	0.54	
National Students Party	Mothe Vishwanatha Rao	439	0.41	
Janata Party	Mir Amjad Ali	434	0.41	
Independent	Godisela Rajesham Goud	345	0.33	
Independent	Mitta Palli Sudarshan	303	0.29	
Independent	Musku Yella Reddy	276	0.26	
Independent	Azizul Rahman	86	0.08	
Majority		5,646	5.32	
Turnout		106,052		

=== 1989 Andhra Pradesh Legislative Assembly election ===
1989 Andhra Pradesh Legislative Assembly election: Jagtial
Party	Candidate	Votes	%	±%
INC	Tatiparthi Jeevan Reddy	62,590	65.95	
TDP	Godisela Rajesham Goud	30,804	32.46	
Janata Party (JP)	Javvaji Madan Mohan Rao	879	0.93	
Independent	Bandu Narsimlu	402	0.42	
Independent	Abdul Khaleel	233	0.25	
Majority		31,786	33.49	
Turnout		94,908		

=== 1985 Andhra Pradesh Legislative Assembly election ===
1985 Andhra Pradesh Legislative Assembly election: Jagtial
Party	Candidate	Votes	%	±%
TDP	Godisela Rajesham Gowd	43,530	57.97	
INC	Jeevan Reddy T.	28,408	37.83	
Independent	Mohd. Yousuf	1,372	1.83	
Independent	P. Ventaiah	988	1.32	
Independent	P. Vishwanath Rao	406	0.54	
Independent	Mothe Vishwanath Rao	391	0.52	
Majority		15,122	20.14	
Turnout		76,452	66.1	

=== 1983 Andhra Pradesh Legislative Assembly election ===
1983 Andhra Pradesh Legislative Assembly election: Jagtial
Party	Candidate	Votes	%	±%
TDP	Jeevan Reddy Tatiparithi	35,699	57.05	
INC	Juvvadi Rathnaker Rao	23,337	37.29	
Independent	Chetti Rajeswer	2,724	4.35	
Independent	Mohd. Ismail	357	0.57	
Independent	Sattarasetti Srinivas	232	0.37	
Independent	Gummadi Rajam	230	0.37	
Majority		12,362	19.76	
Turnout		62,579		

=== 1978 Andhra Pradesh Legislative Assembly election ===
1978 Andhra Pradesh Legislative Assembly election: Jagtial
Party	Candidate	Votes	%	±%
INC(I)	Surender Rao Deevakonda	32,848	53.87	
JP	Joginipalli Damodhar Rao	14,704	24.11	
INC	Hari Hari	13,426	22.02	
Majority		18,144	29.76	
Turnout		62,803	66.8	

== See also ==
- List of constituencies of Telangana Legislative Assembly
