= Kodaganur S. Gopinath =

Indian surgical oncologist

- Born: Bangalore, Karnataka, India
- Spouse: Kusum
- Children: Srinivas; Sindhura
- Awards: Padma Shri; Dr. B. C. Roy Award; Rajoytsava Award; Association of Surgeons of India Award; Panchajanya Puraskara, 2013
- Website: Official web site of Ambuja Health Clinic

Dr. Kodaganur S. Gopinath, MS, FAMS, FRCS (Edin) is an Indian surgical oncologist, known for his pioneering work on oncological research. He is a recipient of many awards including Dr. B. C. Roy Award, considered to be the premier medical honour in the country. The President of India recognised his services to the field of oncology, by awarding him the fourth highest civilian award, Padma Shri, in 2010.

== Biography ==
"I owe almost everything to my sister, Vimala," Dr Gopinath said on joining Kidwai Memorial Institute of Oncology, "She supported me after my father. She had read about the vacancy in Kidwai and called me here."

Kodaganur S. Gopinath was born in Davangere, a small town in Karnataka and had humble beginnings. He had his early schooling at St Paul's Convent School and joined JJM Medical College, Davangere, in 1968, to secure his MBBS degree with third rank, in 1975. Higher studies in general surgery (MS) was done at the King Edward Memorial Hospital and Seth Gordhandas Sunderdas Medical College, Mumbai. Later, he obtained FRCS from the Royal College of Surgeons of Edinburgh and FAMS from the National Academy of Medical Sciences, New Delhi.

On his return from Edinburgh, Dr. Gopinath joined Kidwai Memorial Institute of Oncology, Bangalore as a surgical oncologist where he stayed till he started the work on the Bangalore Institute of Oncology in 1989. He is the Director of Healthcare Global Enterprise (HCG), one of the world's largest cancer care providers and the Director and Consultant Surgical Oncologist at the Bangalore Institute of Oncology and Ambuja Health Care.

Dr. Gopinath is married to a college lecturer, Kusum, and the couple has a son, Srinivas and a daughter, Sindhura. The family resides in Bangalore. Srinivas is a Thoracic Oncology Fellow at Tata Memorial Centre in Mumbai and is recently married. Sindhura is pursuing her PhD in cancer biology at Icahn School of Medicine at Mount Sinai in New York City.

== Legacy ==
Dr. Gopinath founded the Bangalore Institute of Oncology where he is working as the Director and Consultant Surgical Oncologist. He is known to have done extensive research on oncology with special emphasis on the surgery of head and neck, comparative study of laparoscopic and conventional surgical methods, cancer of the rectum and the impact of yoga on cancer. He is also regarded as a specialist in the treatment of breast cancer.

== Positions ==
- 2018 - 2020, President International College of Surgeons, Indian Section
- 2016 - Till Now, Board of Director Asian Oncology Society
- 2013 - 2016 Editorial Board Annals of Surgical Oncology, USA
- 2010 - Till Now - Chairman / Editor Indian Journal of Surgical Oncology
- 2006 – President, Association of Surgeons of India, Chennai
- 2003–2004 – President, Indian Association of Surgical Oncologists
- 2000 – till date – President, Ostamates India, Bangalore
- 2000–2004 – Vice-president, Indian society of oncology
- Chairman – Association Surgeons of India, Karnataka chapter
- 2000–2006 – Joint editor, Indian journal of Surgery
- 1994–2000 – Governing Council Member – Association of Surgeons of India
- 1996 – Member – Scientific Advisory Committee (ICMR), New Delhi

== Awards and recognitions ==
- Professor B G Jirge Memorial Oration - 2018
- Professor S Krishnamurthy Memorial Oration - Tamilnadu - 2018
- Professor Balakrishna Rao Oration of Association of Surgeons of India - 2014
- Professor K P Bhargav Memorial Award - 2013
- Padma Shri – 2010
- Honorary FRCS, Royal College of Surgeons of Edinburgh
- Honorary FAMS National Academy of Medical Sciences, New Delhi – 2004
- Dr. B. C. Roy Award – 2008
- Rajoytsava Award – 2005
- Association of Surgeons of India Award
- Vikas Rathna Award – the International Friendship Society, New Delhi
- Mammadi Saudaver Travelling Fellowship in Oncology – 1987.
- Best Citizen Award – Lions Club, Peenya – 2002

== Publications ==
Dr. Gopinath has published several articles related to oncological studies.

- KS Gopinath; AK Kattepur (29 May 2014). Images in clinical medicine. Metastasis from thyroid carcinoma.
- Rather MI, Swamy S, Gopinath KS, Kumar A (10 January 2014). "Transcriptional repression of tumor suppressor CDC73, encoding an RNA polymerase II interactor, by Wilms tumor 1 protein (WT1) promotes cell proliferation: implication for cancer therapeutics". The Journal of Biological Chemistry. 289 (2): 968–76. doi:10.1074/jbc.M113.483255. PMC 3887219. PMID 24257751.
- Venkatesh T, Nagashri MN, Swamy SS, Mohiyuddin SM, Gopinath KS, Kumar A (2013). "Primary microcephaly gene MCPH1 shows signatures of tumor suppressors and is regulated by miR-27a in oral squamous cell carcinoma". PLOS ONE. 8 (3) e54643. Bibcode:2013PLoSO...854643V. doi:10.1371/journal.pone.0054643. PMC 3589425. PMID 23472065.
- Rather MI, Nagashri MN, Swamy SS, Gopinath KS, Kumar A (4 January 2013). "Oncogenic microRNA-155 down-regulates tumor suppressor CDC73 and promotes oral squamous cell carcinoma cell proliferation: implications for cancer therapeutics". The Journal of Biological Chemistry. 288 (1): 608–618. doi:10.1074/jbc.M112.425736. PMC 3537059. PMID 23166327.
- Jaka RC, Kumar KM, Gopinath KS (May 2009). "Spontaneous expulsion of benign phyllodes". The Breast Journal. 15 (3): 309. doi:10.1111/j.1524-4741.2009.00726.x. PMID 19645792. S2CID 40570877.
- Banerjee B; Vadiraj HS; Ram A; Rao R; Jayapal M; Gopinath KS; Ramesh BS; Rao N; Kumar A; Raghuram N; Hegde S; Nagendra HR; Prakash Hande M. (2007). "Effects of an integrated yoga program in modulating psychological stress and radiation-induced genotoxic stress in breast cancer patients undergoing radiotherapy". Integrative Cancer Therapies. 6 (3): 242–50. doi:10.1177/1534735407306214. PMID 17761637.
