= Lingampet Jagityal railway station =

Railway station in Telangana, India

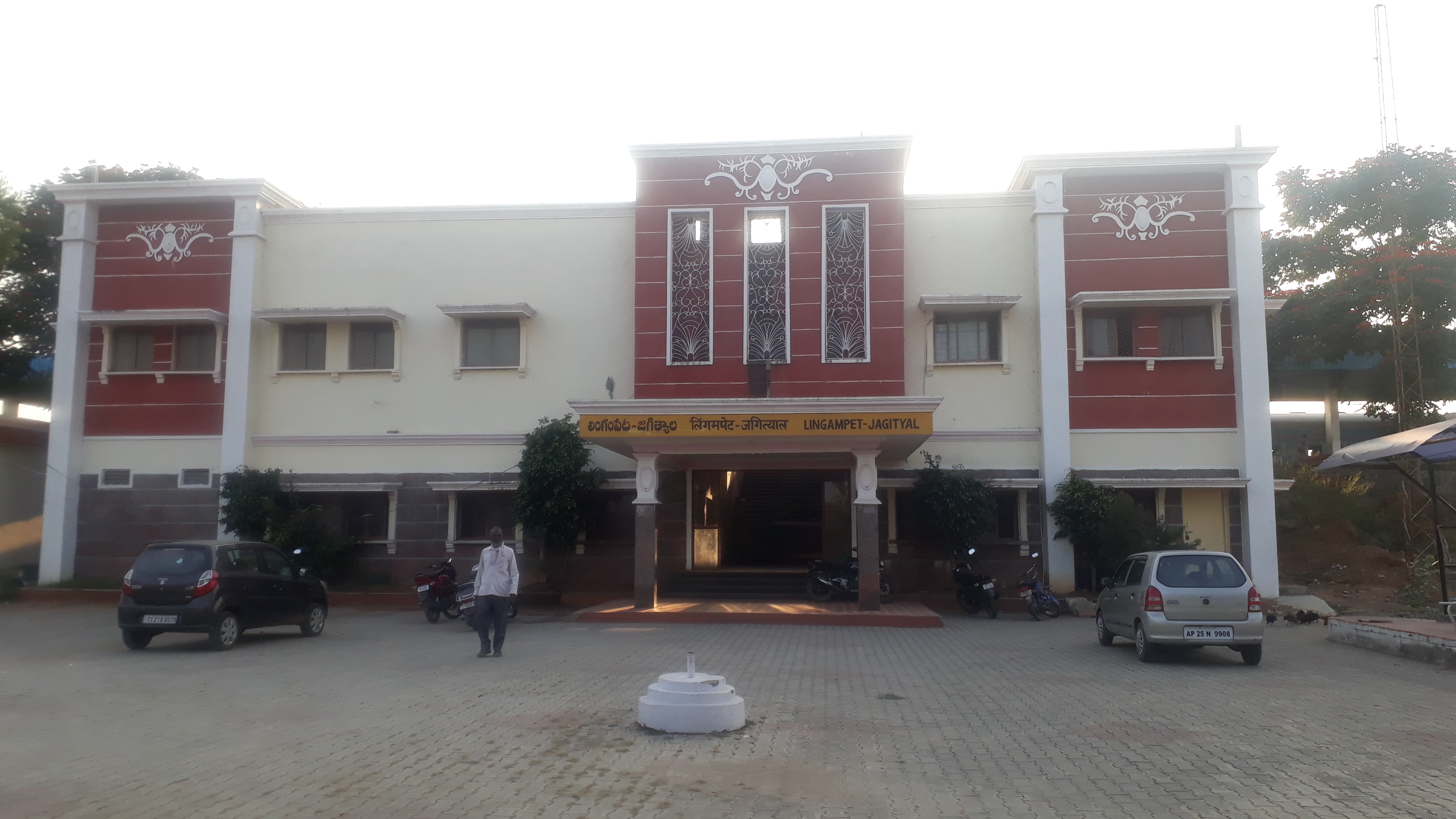
- Railway Station at Jagtiyal

General information
- Location: Jagtial Station, Jagtial - Ambaripet Road and Jagtial - Anthargam Road, Jagtial; India
- Coordinates: 18°46′57″N 78°53′15″E
- Elevation: 296 m (971 ft)
- System: Inter-city and Regional rail station
- Owner: Indian Railways
- Operator: South Central Railway zone
- Line: Peddapalli–Nizamabad line
- Platforms: 2
- Tracks: 3 Indian gauge

Construction
- Structure type: Standard (on ground)

Other information
- Status: Active
- Station code: LPJL
- Zone(s): SCR
- Division(s): Secunderabad
- Classification: Non-suburban grade-6 (NSG-6)

History
- Opened: 2007; 19 years ago
- Electrified: Yes (12 March 2021)
Location

Lingampet Jagityal railway station (station code: LPJL) is a railway station that is part of the Peddapalli–Nizamabad line. It is operated by Indian Railways, serving the town Jagtiyal of Jagtial district in Telangana. It is a major station after Karimnagar railway station (KRMR). It is administered under Secunderabad railway division of South Central Railway zone of Indian Railways.

== History ==
Jagtiyal railway station comes under Peddapalli–Nizamabad line. On 30 June 1993, P. V. Narasimha Rao sanctioned Peddapalli–Nizamabad line. In 2016 the line was inaugurated.
