= Bakkani Narasimhulu =

Indian politician

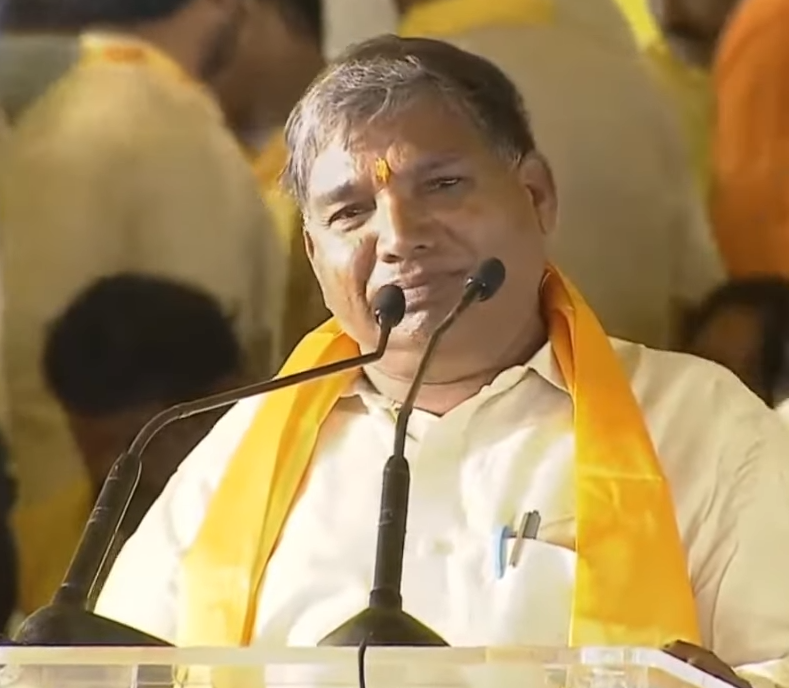
- Narasimhulu in 2022 at Mahanaadu

2nd President of Telugu Desam Party Telangana unit
- In office 19 July 2021 – 10 November 2022
- National President: N. Chandrababu Naidu
- Preceded by: L. Ramana
- Succeeded by: Kasani Gnaneshwar Mudiraj

Member of Legislative Assembly United Andhra Pradesh
- In office 1994–1999
- Chief Minister: N. T. Rama Rao; N. Chandrababu Naidu
- Preceded by: P. Shankar Rao
- Succeeded by: P. Shankar Rao
- Constituency: Shadnagar

Personal details
- Party: Telugu Desam Party
- Occupation: Politician

Bakkani Narasimhulu is an Indian politician belonging to the state of Telangana. He was the president of the Telangana unit of the Telugu Desam Party (abbreviated TDP) from 2021 to 2022 and a senior TDP leader from Mahabubnagar district.

== Political career ==
Bakkani Narasimhulu started his political career in 1983 as an ordinary political activist in the Telugu Desam Party. He worked in various capacities in the joint Mahabubnagar district-TDP unit. Narasimhulu contested the 1994 Andhra Pradesh Assembly elections as a Telugu Desam Party candidate from Shadnagar constituency and won against his nearest rival Congress Party candidate P. Shankar Rao with a majority of 45822 votes and entered the assembly for the first time as an MLA.

In 1999 he refrained from contesting in the legislative assembly election of Andhra Pradesh as this seat was allotted to Bharatiya Janata Party(abbreviated BJP) as a part of TDP-BJP alliance in the respective elections. Later in 2004 he contested in the legislative assembly election of Andhra Pradesh from Shadnagar Assembly constituency as a TDP candidate and lost to his nearest rival Congress Party candidate P. Shankara Rao by a margin of 10632 votes.

Later, he was in-charge of Shadnagar Constituency of Telugu Desam Party, TDP State Secretary, Executive Secretary, SC Cell State President, TTD Governing Body Member, TDP Election Committee Member, Disciplinary Committee Member and Joint Mahabubnagar District TDP President until it got divided into Jogulamba Gadwal district, Wanaparthy district, Nagarkurnool district, and itself as Mahabubnagar district. He worked as a member of the national executive committee and as the national general secretary of TDP. Bakkani Narasimhu contested the 2014 parliamentary elections as a TDP candidate from the Nagarkurnool Lok Sabha constituency and was defeated.

Narsimhulu was appointed as Telangana Telugu Desam Party State President on 19 July 2021.

== Personal life ==
Bakkani Narasimhulu was born in Lingareddy Guda village, Farooqnagar Mandal, Rangareddy District, Telangana state. He completed his tenth standard in 1970 from Zilla Parishad High School, Farooqnagar
