= Alishetty Prabhakar =

Indian author

- Born: 12 January 1954; Jagtial, Karimnagar, India
- Died: 12 January 1993 (aged 39); Hyderabad, Telangana
- Occupations: writer, photographer, painter
- Parent(s): Alishetty Chinnarajam, Alishetty Lakshmi

Alishetty Prabhakar was a painter, photographer and progressive Telugu language writer. He died at the age of 39 due to prolonged illness.

== Early life ==
He was born in Jagital from Jagital district. He discontinued his studies at intermediate level. Initially he started with photographing Festive vibes, Nature and also as a Paparazzi

== Career ==
At first he started his career as an artist. He mainly painted pictures of festivals, nature, and actors. He then had met with "Sahithi Mitra Deepthi" through which he had entered into poetry. He established a studio in Jagithyala "Studio purnima" then in Karimnagar "Studio Shilpi" and also in Hyderabad "Studio Chitralekha". After he joined 'sahithi mitramaa deepthi' he started to write poems. He was also a painter. He wrote articles and poems in the Andhra Jyothi newspaper such as "City Life", and published over 420 items.

His first poem was "Parishkaram" which was published in Andhrasacharithra a weekly newspaper in 1974. He established photo studios and wrote poems. His famous writing were 'Era Pavuralu' (his first writing) in 1978, "Mantala Jendalu", "Churakalu" in 1979, "Raktharekha" in 1985, "Enekala Endamavi" in 1989, "Sankshobha Ghetam" in 1990, "City Life" in 1992. In "City Life" he described Hyderabad in Telangana.

== Bibliography ==
- Yerra Pavuralu
- Mantala Jendalu
- Churakalu
- Raktarekha
- City Life in Andhra Jyothy newspaper
- Maranam naa chivari charanam kaadu
- Sankshobhageetam
