= Deeksha C Mudadevannanavar =

Indian Army medical officer

Deeksha C. Mudadevannanavar
- Military career
- Allegiance: India
- Branch: Indian Army
- Service years: 2019–present
- Rank: Major
- Unit: Parachute Regiment (Special Forces)
- Known for: Reported first woman officer to receive the Balidaan Badge

Deeksha C. Mudadevannanavar is a medical officer in the Army Medical Corps in the Indian Army. It was reported that she is the first woman officer to get posted as a medical officer in a battalion of the Para Regiment (Special Forces) of the Indian Army. It was further reported that she is the first woman officer to be awarded the Balidaan Badge in relation to the Special Forces of the Para Regiment.

== Early life and education ==
Deeksha hails from Davanagere, Karnataka. She graduated in Medicine at J.J.M. Medical College, Davanagere, earning her degrees in Bachelor of Medicine and Bachelor of Surgery. She ranked 596 in All India ranks in the Karnataka Common Entrance Test held in 2012.

Prior to joining the Army, she worked as Community Health Officer at a health center in Santebennur, Karnataka. She has also worked as Junior Resident in the Department of General Surgery at Gadag Institute of Medical Sciences.

== Military career ==
Mudadevannanavar joined the Indian Army as a medical officer under the Short Service Commission in October 2019. After commissioning, she completed her Medical Officers Basic Course at the Army Medical Corps Centre, Lucknow. She was thereafter assigned to 303 Field Hospital based at Tangtse in Leh.

She went on to apply for a posting with the Parachute Regiment. As per reports in The Times of India and Navbharat Times, she was initially unsuccessful in the selection process but was eventually selected for the Special Forces. Her selection was made known in relation to her posting in December 2022.

In March 2023, she was working as the regimental medical officer in a special forces unit and served there for four months.

== Balidaan Badge ==
Mudadevannavar became the first woman officer who earned the Balidaan Badge of Indian Army’s Para Special Forces.
