= Suresh Hanagavadi =

Indian physician and haemophilia activist (1963)

Suresh Hanagavadi (born 1 November 1963) is an Indian physician, pathologist and haemophilia activist from Davanagere, Karnataka. He is the founder and president of the Karnataka Haemophilia Society. He is the recipient of the Padma Shri (2026) and the National Award "Shresth Divyangjan" (2024).

== Early life and education ==
Hanagavadi was born on 1 November 1963 in Davanagere, Karnataka. He was born with Haemophilia B, a condition that affects blood clotting. He earned his MBBS degree from JJM Medical College, Davanagere and completed his post-graduate training in pathology at the Karnataka Institute of Medical Sciences, Hubballi.

== Career and advocacy ==
Hanagavadi is a professor of pathology at JJM Medical College, Davanagere. In 1990, he founded the Karnataka Haemophilia Society (KHS) which provides free diagnosis, treatment, physiotherapy and rehabilitation for haemophilia patients.

He established partnerships with Henry Ford Hospital (US) and Alder Hey Children's Hospital (UK) under the World Federation of Hemophilia Twinning Program. In 2014, his centre received the Best Treatment Centre Twin Award in Melbourne.

His advocacy made Karnataka the first Indian state to provide free clotting factor medication through government hospitals, a model later adopted nationally. He also worked to include haemophilia under the Disabilities Act.

He has served as President of the Hemophilia Federation of India (2004–2010), Advisor to the Karnataka Disability Commissioner (2019–2025) and President of the Karnataka Chapter of the Indian Association of Pathologists and Microbiologists (2022–2023).

== Awards and recognition ==
Hanagavadi received the Padma Shri in 2026 and the National Award "Shresth Divyangjan" in 2024. Other awards include the Deccan Herald Change Maker Award (2021), Red & White Bravery Award (2005), Best Blood Bank Officer State Award (2003) and TOYI Award (2001).
