= Mana Party (India) =

Political party

Mana Party ('Our Party') is a political party in United Andhra Pradesh, India. It was founded in 2007 by 93 BC Castes' Aiykya Vedika. MLC Kasani Gnaneswer is the president of the party. The party seeks to represent the interests of the backwards caste.
