= Pegadapally =

- Village
- Location in Telangana, India Pegadapally (India)
- Coordinates: 18.729299°N 77.904224°E
- Country: India
- State: Telangana
- District: Jagtial

Population (2011)
  - Total: 5,502

Languages
  - Official: Telugu
- Time zone: UTC+5:30 (IST)
- PIN: 505532
- Vehicle registration: TS-02
- Website: telangana.gov.in

Pegadapally (or Pegadapalle) is a village in Pegadapally mandal of Jagtial district in the state of Indian state of Telangana.

== Demographics ==
As of 2011 census, Pegadapalle had a population of 5,502. The total population constitute, 2,806 males and 2,696 females —a sex ratio of 961 females per 1000 males. 421 children are in the age group of 0–6 years. The average literacy rate stands at 58.32% with 2,963 literates.
