= M. Sanjay Kumar =

Indian politician (born 1962)

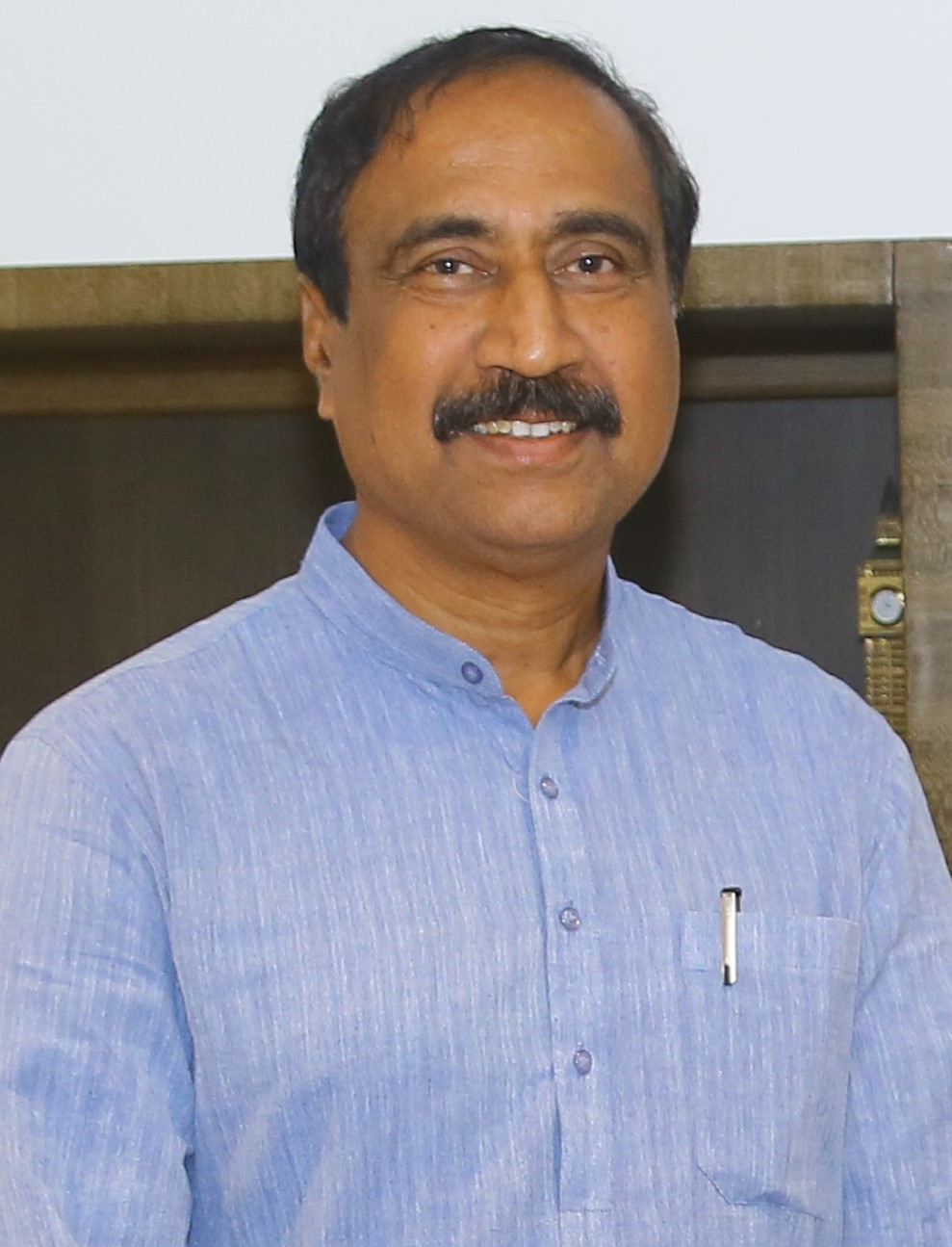

Member of the Telangana Legislative Assembly
- Incumbent
- Assumed office 2018–present
- Preceded by: T. Jeevan Reddy
- Constituency: Jagtial

Personal details
- Born: 6 June 1962 (age 64) Jagtial, Telangana State, India
- Party: Indian National Congress
- Other political affiliations: Bharat Rashtra Samithi (2018- 2024)
- Spouse: Radhika
- Children: 1 Daughter
- Parent(s): Hanumantharao, Vatsala
- Occupation: Politician & Doctor

M. Sanjay Kumar (born 6 July 1962) is an Indian politician in the state of Telangana. He is a member of Telangana Legislative Assembly from Jagtial constituency of Jagtial district for a second term after making his debut as a law maker in 2018.

== Early life and education ==
Sanjay Kumar was born in Anthargam village, Jagtial mandal to Vathsala and Hanumantha Rao. He studied MBBS at Siddartha Medical College, Vijayawada under Acharya Nagarjuna University in 1989. Later, he did his M.S. in ophthalmology from JJM Medical College, Davanagiri in Karnataka under the Kuvempu University in 1992.

== Career ==
He contested as a Bharat Rashtra Samithi candidate and won the Jagtial seat in the 2023 Telangana Legislative Assembly election defeating T. Jeevan Reddy of Congress by 15,822 votes. In 2018, Jeevan Reddy, then a sitting MLA, lost by a bigger margin of 42,439 votes. Sanjay joined the Congress party on 23 June 2024 in the presence of Telangana Pradesh Congress Committee chief and chief minister A Revanth Reddy.
