= Telugu Desam Party =

Indian political party

- Abbreviation: TDP
- President: N. Chandrababu Naidu
- General Secretary: Nara Lokesh
- Parliamentary Chairperson: Lavu Sri Krishna Devarayalu
- Rajya Sabha Leader: Sana Sathish
- Lok Sabha Leader: Lavu Sri Krishna Devarayalu
- Founder: N. T. Rama Rao
- Founded: 29 March 1982 (44 years ago)
- Headquarters: N. T. R. Bhavan, Hyderabad, Andhra Pradesh, India (present-day Telangana) (historical); N. T. R. Bhavan, Mangalagiri, Andhra Pradesh, India (present)
- Student wing: Telugu Nadu Students Federation
- Youth wing: Telugu Yuvatha
- Women's wing: Telugu Mahila
- Labour wing: Telugu Nadu Trade Union Council
- Peasant's wing: Telugu Rythu
- Ideology: Telugu regionalism; Secularism (Indian); Populism; Economic liberalism; Federalism; Neoliberalism
- Political position: Centre to centre-right
- Colours: Yellow
- ECI status: State party
- Alliance: National Alliance NDA (1999–2004; 2014–2018; since 2024); Regional Alliances Kutami (since 2024, Andhra Pradesh); Former Alliances: National Front (1989–1996, National); United Front (1996–1998, National); Third Front (2009, National); Maha Kutami (2009, Andhra Pradesh); Praja Kutami (2018, Telangana)
- Seats in Rajya Sabha: 4 / 245
- Seats in Lok Sabha: 16 / 543
- Seats in State Legislative Councils: 12 / 58 (Andhra Pradesh); 0 / 40 (Telangana)
- Seats in State Legislative Assemblies: 135 / 175 (Andhra Pradesh); 0 / 119 (Telangana)
- Number of states and union territories in government: 1 / 31

Election symbol
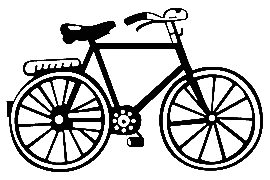
- Bicycle

Party flag

Website
- www.telugudesam.org

The Telugu Desam Party (TDP; transl. Party of the Telugu Land) is an Indian regional political party primarily active in the states of Andhra Pradesh and Telangana. It was founded by Indian matinée idol N. T. Rama Rao (NTR) on 29 March 1982, it holds the distinction of being the first regional political party established in the erstwhile united Andhra Pradesh. The party was formed on the ideology of "Telugu Vari Atma Gouravam" (Telugu People's Self-Respect) and has since focused on the socio-economic empowerment and cultural identity of the Telugu people.

TDP has won a majority in the Andhra Pradesh Legislative Assembly six times, emerging as the most successful political outfit in the state's history. It also is the first regional party to serve as the main opposition in the Lok Sabha, a feat achieved following the 1984 Indian general elections. Currently, it serves as the ruling party in Andhra Pradesh Legislative Assembly.

Since 1 September 1995, the party has been led by N. T. Rama Rao's son-in-law, Nara Chandra Babu Naidu, who serves as the national president of the party. Under his leadership, the party became a key architect of National Front and United Front governments at the Center. The party's headquarters, known as N. T. R. Bhavan, is located at Mangalagiri, Andhra Pradesh.

Post May 4, 2026, the TDP has the third largest number of MLAs across the whole country.

== Ideology and symbolism ==
The Telugu Desam Party follows a pro-Telugu ideology. It was founded as an alternative to the Congress hegemony, by emphasising Telugu regional pride and serving as the party for farmers, backward castes and middle-class people. Since the 1990s, it has followed an economically liberal policy that has been seen as pro-business and pro-development.

The party flag features a yellow background symbolising prosperity and energy, with a house symbolizing families, a plough for farmers and a wheel representing workers and progress. Its official electoral symbol is the bicycle.

=== Mahanadu ===
The party holds its annual conclave and ideological gathering known as Mahanadu (transl. Grand Conclave), a tradition initiated by founder N. T. Rama Rao. The first Mahanadu was organised in Vijayawada in May 1983, shortly after party's landslide victory in the 1983 Andhra Pradesh Legislative Assembly election. It serves as the party's primary platform for strategic decision making, policy formulation, leadership reaffirmation and mass mobilisation. The conclave is held for three days, usually around Rao's birth anniversary on 28 May.

== Membership ==
The party runs a biennial membership drive, offering enrollment for ₹100. Since 2014, every active member enrolled through this drive has been covered under a group personal accident insurance policy, a first-of-its-kind initiative by any political party in the country. The policy provided ₹2 lakh in case of accidental death or permanent total disability, such as the loss of both limbs or eyes. It also includes educational assistance of ₹5,000 per child (up to two children) and covers hospital treatment expenses up to ₹50,000 resulting from such accidents. By 2025, the party had crossed the milestone of one crore active members and the insurance coverage was increased to ₹5 lakh. Over 2,500 children of party workers have received financial support for higher education, and ₹103.28 crore has been distributed to the families of 5,164 deceased workers.

== History ==
=== N. T. Rama Rao (1983–1995) ===
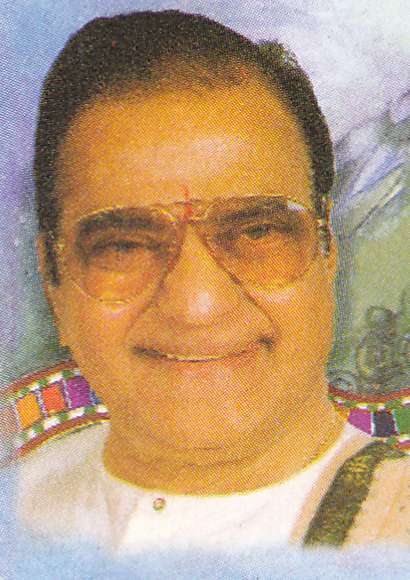
N. Taraka Rama Rao

Nandamuri Taraka Rama Rao (NTR) is a prominent figure in Indian cinema and politics, particularly known for his influence in Telugu-speaking regions. As an actor, he gained widespread recognition not only among Telugu-speaking people but across the country. NTR's contributions extend beyond the film industry, as he played a significant role in Andhra Pradesh's political landscape.

On 18 November 1977, the Pralaya cyclone struck the coastal regions of Andhra Pradesh, particularly affecting Diviseema in Krishna district. The cyclone caused widespread devastation, with turbulent seas resulting in massive flooding. Thousands of people lost their lives, and extensive property damage was reported. Official reports indicated casualties more than 10,000. Around 20,000 acres of crops were destroyed, and the overall damage was estimated to be in crores of rupees. The event left a lasting impact on the people of the region, and the memory of the flooding is still vivid among locals.

Shocked by the devastation, NTR mobilized support from the film industry and the general public to assist the victims of Diviseema. He appealed to people for donations, and the funds raised were used for the rehabilitation of the affected communities.

In response to the challenges faced by the people of Andhra Pradesh, NTR founded the Telugu Desam Party (TDP) on 29 March 1982, with the aim of addressing the state's political and socio-economic issues. The party's formation marked a shift in the political landscape, as it sought to provide an alternative to the long-standing rule of the Indian National Congress, which had been in power for over 26 years. In the 1983 state elections, the TDP secured a landslide victory, and NTR was sworn in as the 10th Chief Minister of Andhra Pradesh on 9 January 1983.

However, NTR's tenure as Chief Minister was interrupted in August 1984 when he went to the United States for medical treatment. During his absence, Nadendla Bhaskara Rao, a TDP MLA, took office as the Chief Minister with the support of the then Governor, Thakur Ram Lal. NTR's son-in-law Naidu, played an active role in rallying the support of legislators for NTR. He gathered them at Ramakrishna Cine Studios until NTR's return. On 16 September 1984, NTR led a march and protest in Delhi, demonstrating against the central government's actions under Prime Minister Indira Gandhi. Subsequently, NTR regained his position as Chief Minister, restoring his leadership in the state.

In 1985, after successfully regaining his position as Chief Minister following a brief political crisis, NTR called for fresh elections. The elections resulted in a landslide victory for the TDP. Naidu, who was initially involved in party activities by organizing training programs for legislators and computerizing membership records, was subsequently appointed as the party's general secretary in 1986.

During his tenure as Chief Minister, NTR implemented significant reforms in Andhra Pradesh, including the divestment of state industries, the introduction of the 1995 MACS Act for co-operatives, and an overhaul of the education system with statewide entrance exams like EAMCET. He also initiated welfare programs such as subsidized rice and housing, along with large-scale irrigation projects like the Telugu Ganga project. NTR's governance focused on decentralization, women empowerment, and enhancing the state's infrastructure, making lasting contributions to its political and economic development.

The party lost power in the 1989 Andhra Pradesh Legislative Assembly election, and was restricted to the opposition. However, it regained power in the 1994 Andhra Pradesh Legislative Assembly election. NTR was sworn in as Chief Minister for the fourth time. At the national level, the National Front (NF) was established under the leadership of the Janata Dal, which governed India from 1989 to 1990. NTR served as its chairman.

In 1995, a political crisis in Andhra Pradesh resulted in the removal of NTR as both the Chief Minister and the party president. NTR's son-in-law, N. Chandrababu Naidu, along with other family members, including Nandamuri Harikrishna, Nandamuri Balakrishna, and eldest son-in-law Daggubati Venkateswara Rao, ousted NTR from his roles in the party and government. Naidu accused NTR of being influenced by his second wife, Lakshmi Parvathi, whom he had married in 1993 following the death of his first wife, Basava Tarakam, in 1985. With the majority of party legislators supporting him, Naidu went on to become the longest-serving Chief Minister of Andhra Pradesh and the president of TDP since then.

On 18 January 1996, NTR died of a heart attack at his residence in Hyderabad, aged 72. With Naidu already assuming leadership of the TDP, Lakshmi Parvathi founded the NTR Telugu Desam Party (Lakshmi Parvathi). However, it failed to make any impact on the TDP's performance or vote share.

=== N. Chandrababu Naidu (1995–present) ===
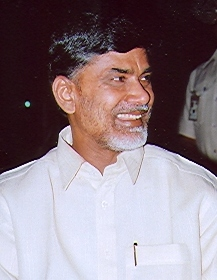
N. Chandrababu Naidu

Following the internal party crisis, with N. Chandrababu Naidu having assumed the role of Chief Minister of Andhra Pradesh and president of the party in 1995, the party underwent a significant transformation. Naidu's leadership marked a shift from the populist approach of NTR to a more technocratic and development-oriented governance model.

Naidu's first term as Chief Minister (1995–2004) is widely recognized for its focus on economic reforms and technological advancement. He prioritised transforming Hyderabad into a major IT hub, earning the moniker "CEO of Andhra Pradesh." His administration introduced initiatives like the Janmabhoomi program for rural development, e-seva centers for e-governance and infrastructure projects, including highways and bridges. Naidu's policies attracted global investment, notably in the IT sector.

Naidu's rise coincided with a role on the national stage with the formation of the United Front (UF), a coalition of non-Congress and non-BJP parties in 1996 to provide a third alternative government at the center. Following the inconclusive 1996 Indian general election, which resulted in a hung parliament, the TDP with 16 Lok Sabha seats extended support to the United Front government led by Prime Minister H. D. Deve Gowda and later I. K. Gujral. Naidu also served as the UF convenor.

In the 1999 Andhra Pradesh Legislative Assembly election, the TDP under Naidu's leadership secured victory, winning 180 out of 294 seats. The party provided outside support to the Atal Bihari Vajpayee led central government as part of the National Democratic Alliance.

Despite these achievements, Naidu faced criticism for his perceived neglect of the agricultural sector and rural communities. Several droughts and increasing agrarian distress during his tenure intensified dissatisfaction among rural voters. This growing discontent contributed to the TDP's defeat in the 2004 Andhra Pradesh Legislative Assembly election, with the Indian National Congress, returning to power. After the 2004 electoral loss, Naidu continued to serve as the Leader of the Opposition and sought to reconnect with rural voters by adjusting the party's focus toward welfare and agricultural concerns. However, the TDP was again defeated in the 2009 Andhra Pradesh Legislative Assembly election. During this period, Naidu remained an active figure in state politics, critiquing government policies and advocating for development-oriented reforms.

The bifurcation of Andhra Pradesh in 2014, which resulted in the formation of the new state of Telangana, led the party to establish separate units for both Telugu-speaking states.

==== Andhra Pradesh (since 2014) ====
In the 2014 Andhra Pradesh Legislative Assembly election held that year, Naidu led the TDP to victory in the residual state of Andhra Pradesh as part of the NDA once again. He was sworn in as the first Chief Minister of the newly reorganized Andhra Pradesh. His administration focused on building a new capital city at Amaravati, improving infrastructure, promoting foreign investment and enhancing public service delivery through digital initiatives. Despite these efforts, the Naidu government faced growing criticism over delays in capital construction and its inability to secure Special Category Status for the state from the centre. In the 2019 Andhra Pradesh Legislative Assembly election, the TDP suffered a major defeat to the YSR Congress Party, and Naidu once again became the Leader of the Opposition.

The party accused the ruling YSR Congress Party of political harassment and the use of derogatory language against its leader Naidu. Several TDP members were arrested and attacked, many killed, while party president Naidu was arrested in 2023 on alleged corruption charges, which he and his party described as politically motivated. His arrest led to widespread protests by party supporters across the state. Throughout its time in opposition, the TDP organized various demonstrations and campaigns criticizing the government's policies and governance.

In the 2024 elections, Naidu re-established the alliance with the Bharatiya Janata Party and the Jana Sena Party, rejoining the NDA. The alliance won a landslide victory in the 2024 Andhra Pradesh Legislative Assembly election, while the YSRCP suffered a major setback and failed to secure the status of the opposition. The result had the highest seat share for the TDP in its electoral history. Naidu was sworn in for a fourth term as Chief Minister, marking a historic political comeback.

==== Telangana (since 2014) ====
After the formation of Telangana, the TDP, in alliance with Bharatiya Janata Party (BJP), contested the 2014 Legislative Assembly election. TDP won 15 seats in the newly formed Telangana Legislative Assembly securing most of its seats in the districts of Ranga Reddy, Hyderabad, Mahabubnagar, Warangal, and Khammam. The party also won a Lok Sabha seat from Malkajgiri in the simultaneously held 2014 Indian general election. However, defections of legislators and other leaders from TDP to the Telangana Rashtra Samithi (TRS), now known as Bharat Rashtra Samithi (BRS), and the alleged portrayal of TDP as an "Andhra party" by the TRS, led to a decline of the party's influence in the state.

In the 2016 Greater Hyderabad Municipal Corporation election, TDP won just one councillor seat out of 150. In the 2018 Telangana Legislative Assembly election, the party won two seats, both in Khammam district, out of 119 seats. It had contested the 2018 elections as part of the Praja Kutami, which included the Indian National Congress, traditionally a long-time opponent of TDP and other parties.

Following the bifurcation, TDP created separate state units for both Andhra Pradesh and Telangana. In 2015, L. Ramana, a two time former MLA from Jagtial, was appointed as the first president of the Telangana unit of TDP, serving until 2021. Ramana later quit the party to join the BRS. He was succeeded by Bakkani Narasimhulu, a former MLA from Shadnagar, in July 2021. The party performed poorly in the 2020 Greater Hyderabad Municipal Corporation election, failing to win any seats.

In November 2022, Kasani Gnaneshwar Mudiraj, a former MLC and BC leader, was appointed president of Telangana TDP by N. Chandrababu Naidu. Kasani, who had also served as the national president of the Mudiraj Mahasabha, initiated efforts to revive the party in Telangana after his appointment.

However, on 30 October 2023, Kasani resigned as Telangana TDP president and joined the BRS, following N. Chandrababu Naidu announcement that TDP would not contest the 2023 Telangana Legislative Assembly election. Since then, the party's Telangana unit has remained without a leader. The party also announced that it would not contest the 2024 Indian general election in Telangana, but would continue to be part of the NDA.

==== Andaman and Nicobar Islands ====
The TDP also holds influence in the union territory Andaman and Nicobar Islands, contesting the Port Blair Islands periodically. With a significant Telugu population in the islands, the party secured and maintained two seats in both the 2015 and 2022 council elections. On 14 March 2023, TDP councillor S. Selvi was elected as the chairperson, as part of the TDP–BJP alliance.

== Electoral performance ==
=== Lok Sabha electoral performance ===
The Telugu Desam Party has had a significant presence in the Lok Sabha elections since its formation in 1982. In its first election in 1984, the party made a debut by winning 30 out of 42 seats in Andhra Pradesh. Over the years, TDP's performance in the Lok Sabha elections has fluctuated. In the 1989 elections, the party's influence slightly waned but it remained a key player in the state's politics.

N. T. Rama Rao served as the chairperson of the National Front, a coalition of non-Congress parties in the late 1980s. The TDP saw a resurgence in the 1996 and 1999 elections, forming alliances with national parties. N. Chandrababu Naidu played a crucial role as the convenor of the United Front, a coalition of non-BJP and non-Congress parties in the mid-1990s.

During the late 1990s, TDP leader G. M. C. Balayogi served as the Speaker of the Lok Sabha from 1998 to 2002. The party played a crucial role in supporting the Janata Dal coalition government and was instrumental in the formation of the BJP-led National Democratic Alliance (NDA) government with Atal Bihari Vajpayee as Prime Minister. The party's alliance with the BJP was pivotal in securing the necessary majority for the NDA.

The TDP's fortunes declined in the 2004 and 2009 elections, but it improved its seat count in 2014, winning 16 seats in alliance as part of the NDA. Naidu served as the convenor until 2018. However, in the 2019 elections, TDP faced a major setback, winning only 3 seats amidst strong competition from other parties in the state. After the bifurcation of Andhra Pradesh in 2014, the Lok Sabha seats were divided between the newly formed state of Telangana and Andhra Pradesh, leaving behind 25 seats in Andhra Pradesh and 17 seats in Telangana. In the recent 2024 election, the party, part of the NDA, managed to win 16 seats, playing a key role in the formation of the Third Modi ministry.

Lok Sabha elections (since 1983)
Year	Lok Sabha	Party leader	Seats contested	Seats won	Change in seats	(%) of votes	Vote swing	Popular vote	Outcome	Ref.
1984	8th	N. T. Rama Rao	34	30 / 543	new	4.31%	new	10,132,859	Others	
1989	9th	N. T. Rama Rao	33	2 / 543	▼28	3.29%	▼1.02	9,909,728	Coalition (NF, 1989–90)	
1989	9th	N. T. Rama Rao	33	2 / 543	▼28	3.29%	▼1.02	9,909,728	Others (1990–91)	
1991	10th	N. T. Rama Rao	35	13 / 543	▲11	2.99%	▼0.30	8,223,271	Others	
1996	11th	N. Chandrababu Naidu	36	16 / 543	▲3	2.97%	▼0.02	9,931,826	Others (1996)	
1996	11th	N. Chandrababu Naidu	36	16 / 543	▲3	2.97%	▼0.02	9,931,826	Coalition (UF, 1996–98)	
1998	12th	N. Chandrababu Naidu	35	12 / 543	▼4	2.77%	▼0.20	10,199,463	Outside support for NDA	
1999	13th	N. Chandrababu Naidu	34	29 / 543	▲17	3.65%	▲0.88	13,297,370	Coalition (NDA)	
2004	14th	N. Chandrababu Naidu	35	5 / 543	▼24	3.04%	▼0.61	11,844,811	Others	
2009	15th	N. Chandrababu Naidu	31	6 / 543	▲1	2.51%	▼0.53	10,481,659	Others	
2014	16th	N. Chandrababu Naidu	30	16 / 543	▲10	2.55%	▲0.04	14,099,230	Coalition (NDA, 2014–18)	
2014	16th	N. Chandrababu Naidu	30	16 / 543	▲10	2.55%	▲0.04	14,099,230	Others (2018–19)	
2019	17th	N. Chandrababu Naidu	25	3 / 543	▼13	2.04%	▼0.51	12,515,345	Others	
2024	18th	N. Chandrababu Naidu	17	16 / 543	▲13	1.98%	▼0.06	12,775,270	Coalition (NDA)	

All time-TDP Lok Sabha seat count

=== State assemblies electoral performance ===
Andhra Pradesh Legislative Assembly
Year	Assembly	Party leader	Seats contested	Seats won	Change in seats	(%) of votes	Vote swing	Popular vote	Outcome
1983	7th	N. T. Rama Rao	289	201 / 294	new	46.30%	new	9,777,222	Government
1985	8th	N. T. Rama Rao	250	202 / 294	▲1	46.21%	▼0.09	10,625,508	Government
1989	9th	N. T. Rama Rao	241	74 / 294	▼127	36.54%	▼9.67	10,506,982	Opposition
1994	10th	N. T. Rama Rao	251	216 / 294	▲142	44.14%	▲7.60	13,743,842	Government
1999	11th	N. Chandrababu Naidu	269	180 / 294	▼36	43.87%	▼0.27	14,613,307	Government
2004	12th	N. Chandrababu Naidu	267	47 / 294	▼133	37.59%	▼6.28	13,444,168	Opposition
2009	13th	N. Chandrababu Naidu	225	92 / 294	▲45	28.12%	▼9.47	11,826,457	Opposition
2014	14th	N. Chandrababu Naidu	165	102 / 175	new	44.90%	new	12,916,000	Government
2019	15th	N. Chandrababu Naidu	175	23 / 175	▼79	39.17%	▼5.73	12,304,668	Opposition
2024	16th	N. Chandrababu Naidu	144	135 / 175	▲112	45.60%	▲6.43	15,384,576	Government

Telangana Legislative Assembly
Year	Assembly	Party leader	Seats contested	Seats won	Change in seats	(%) of votes	Vote swing	Popular vote	Outcome
2014	1st	N. Chandrababu Naidu	72	15 / 119	new	14.7%	new	2,828,492	Others
2018	2nd	N. Chandrababu Naidu	13	2 / 119	▼13	3.51%	▼11.20	725,845	Others
2023	3rd	N. Chandrababu Naidu	Did not contest						

Puducherry Legislative Assembly
Year	Assembly	Party leader	Seats contested	Seats won	Change in seats	(%) of votes	Vote swing	Popular vote	Outcome
1985	7th	N. T. Rama Rao	1	0 / 30	new	17.94	new	1,248	Lost

== Party leadership ==
The TDP is governed by its Politburo, the party's highest decision-making and policy-formulating body, which oversees organisational affairs, political strategy and major party decisions. The Politburo is supported by a wider organisational structure comprising the National President, National Working President, vice-presidents, general secretaries, secretaries, state unit presidents and other office-bearers at various levels of the party.

Since its formation in 1982, the party has been led by only two presidents. The party was founded by NTR, who served as its president from its inception until the internal party crisis of 1995. Following the leadership change that year, N. Chandrababu Naidu assumed the presidency and has remained the party's principal leader ever since.

Following bifurcation, the party reorganised its structure by constituting separate state units for Andhra Pradesh and Telangana while retaining a unified central leadership under the national organisation in 2015. In 2025, Nara Lokesh was elevated as the National Working President of the party, becoming the first leader to hold the position.

Unlike the presidency, the office of General Secretary has historically been held by multiple leaders simultaneously, with responsibilities distributed across different organisational and functional areas. Among the party's early organisational leaders, N. Chandrababu Naidu emerged as a key figure after playing a prominent role in safeguarding the party during the 1984 constitutional crisis and was subsequently appointed General Secretary in 1986, serving until he became party president in 1995.

=== President ===
List of Presidents
#	Portrait	Name (Lifespan)	Term in office		
#	Portrait	Name (Lifespan)	Assumed office	Left office	Time in office
1		N. T. Rama Rao (1923–1996)	29 March 1982	31 August 1995	13 years, 155 days
2		N. Chandrababu Naidu (born 1950)	1 September 1995	28 May 2015	19 years, 269 days

List of National Presidents
#	Portrait	Name (Lifespan)	Term in office		
#	Portrait	Name (Lifespan)	Assumed office	Left office	Time in office
1		N. Chandrababu Naidu (born 1950)	29 May 2015	Incumbent	11 years, 120 days

=== National Working President ===
List of National Working Presidents
#	Portrait	Name (Lifespan)	Term in office		
#	Portrait	Name (Lifespan)	Assumed office	Left office	Time in office
1		Nara Lokesh (born 1983)	15 April 2026	Incumbent	164 days

=== General Secretary ===
List of General Secretaries
#	Portrait	Name (Lifespan)	Term in office		
#	Portrait	Name (Lifespan)	Assumed office	Left office	Time in office
1		N. Chandrababu Naidu (born 1950)	1986	31 August 1995	10 years
The party continued the practice of appointing multiple General Secretaries simultaneously rather than maintaining a single office-holder.

=== Regional units ===
List of regional unit presidents
#	Name (Lifespan)	Term in office			Ref.
#	Name (Lifespan)	Assumed office	Left office	Time in office	Ref.
Andhra Pradesh
1	Kimidi Kalavenkata Rao	30 September 2015	19 October 2020	5 years, 20 days	
2	Kinjarapu Atchannaidu	20 October 2020	13 June 2024	3 years, 237 days	
3	Palla Srinivasa Rao	14 June 2024	Incumbent	2 years, 105 days	
Telangana
1	L. Ramana	30 September 2015	9 July 2021	5 years, 282 days	
2	Bakkani Narasimhulu	19 July 2021	4 November 2022	1 year, 108 days	
3	Kasani Gnaneshwar Mudiraj	10 November 2022	30 October 2023	354 days	
Andaman and Nicobar Islands
1	Nakkala Manikya Rao Yadav	24 October 2024	Incumbent	1 year, 337 days	

== Legislative leaders ==
=== List of speakers of the Lok Sabha ===
#	Portrait	Name (Lifespan)	Term in office			Lok Sabha (Election)	Constituency	Prime Minister
#	Portrait	Name (Lifespan)	Assumed office	Left office	Time in office	Lok Sabha (Election)	Constituency	Prime Minister
1		G. M. C. Balayogi (1951–2002)	24 March 1998	19 October 1999	3 years, 341 days	12th (1998)	Amalapuram	Atal Bihari Vajpayee
1		G. M. C. Balayogi (1951–2002)	22 October 1999	3 March 2002	3 years, 341 days	13th (1999)	Amalapuram	Atal Bihari Vajpayee

=== List of union cabinet ministers ===
#	Portrait	Portfolio	Name (Lifespan)	Term in office			Constituency (House)	Prime Minister
#	Portrait	Portfolio	Name (Lifespan)	Assumed office	Left office	Time in office	Constituency (House)	Prime Minister
1		Minister of Information and Broadcasting	P. Upendra (1936–2009)	6 December 1989	10 November 1990	339 days	Andhra Pradesh (Rajya Sabha)	V. P. Singh
1		Minister of Parliamentary Affairs	P. Upendra (1936–2009)	6 December 1989	10 November 1990	339 days	Andhra Pradesh (Rajya Sabha)	V. P. Singh
2		Minister of Rural Areas and Employment	Kinjarapu Yerran Naidu (1957–2012)	1 June 1996	21 April 1997	324 days	Srikakulam (Lok Sabha)	Deve Gowda
2		Minister of Rural Areas and Employment	Kinjarapu Yerran Naidu (1957–2012)	21 April 1997	19 March 1998	332 days	Srikakulam (Lok Sabha)	I. K. Gujral
3		Minister of Commerce [MoS(I/C)]	Bolla Bulli Ramaiah (1926–2018)	29 June 1996	21 April 1997	296 days	Eluru (Lok Sabha)	Deve Gowda
3		Minister of Commerce [MoS(I/C)]	Bolla Bulli Ramaiah (1926–2018)	21 April 1997	19 March 1998	332 days	Eluru (Lok Sabha)	I. K. Gujral
3		Minister of Textiles [MoS(I/C)]	Bolla Bulli Ramaiah (1926–2018)	20 January 1998	19 March 1998	58 days	Eluru (Lok Sabha)	I. K. Gujral
4		Ministry of Health and Family Welfare (MoS)	Renuka Chowdhury (born 1954)	9 June 1997	19 March 1998	283 days	Andhra Pradesh (Rajya Sabha)	I. K. Gujral
5		Minister of Power (MoS)	Samudrala Venugopal Chary (born 1959)	1 June 1996	21 April 1997	324 days	Adilabad (Lok Sabha)	I. K. Gujral
5		Minister of Power (MoS)	Samudrala Venugopal Chary (born 1959)	21 April 1997	9 June 1997	49 days	Adilabad (Lok Sabha)	I. K. Gujral
5		Minister of Agriculture (MoS)	Samudrala Venugopal Chary (born 1959)	9 June 1997	19 March 1998	283 days	Adilabad (Lok Sabha)	I. K. Gujral
5		Minister of Non-Conventional Energy Sources (MoS)	Samudrala Venugopal Chary (born 1959)	29 June 1996	21 February 1997	237 days	Adilabad (Lok Sabha)	Deve Gowda
6		Minister of Agriculture (MoS)	Ummareddy Venkateswarlu (born 1935)	1 June 1996	29 June 1996	28 days	Bapatla (Lok Sabha)	Deve Gowda
6		Minister of Parliamentary Affairs (MoS)	Ummareddy Venkateswarlu (born 1935)	1 June 1996	29 June 1996	28 days	Bapatla (Lok Sabha)	Deve Gowda
6		Minister of Parliamentary Affairs (MoS)	Ummareddy Venkateswarlu (born 1935)	29 June 1996	21 April 1997	296 days	Bapatla (Lok Sabha)	Deve Gowda
6		Minister of Parliamentary Affairs (MoS)	Ummareddy Venkateswarlu (born 1935)	21 April 1997	9 June 1997	49 days	Bapatla (Lok Sabha)	I. K. Gujral
6		Minister of Urban Affairs and Employment (MoS)	Ummareddy Venkateswarlu (born 1935)	29 June 1996	21 April 1997	296 days	Bapatla (Lok Sabha)	Deve Gowda
6		Minister of Urban Affairs and Employment (MoS)	Ummareddy Venkateswarlu (born 1935)	21 April 1997	9 June 1997	49 days	Bapatla (Lok Sabha)	I. K. Gujral
6		Minister of Urban Affairs and Employment [MoS(I/C)]	Ummareddy Venkateswarlu (born 1935)	9 June 1997	19 March 1998	283 days	Bapatla (Lok Sabha)	I. K. Gujral
7		Minister of Civil Aviation	Ashok Gajapathi Raju (born 1961)	26 May 2014	9 March 2018	3 years, 297 days	Vizianagaram (Lok Sabha)	Narendra Modi
8		Minister of Science & Technology (MoS)	Sujana Chowdary (born 1961)	9 November 2014	9 March 2018	3 years, 120 days	Andhra Pradesh (Rajya Sabha)	Narendra Modi
8		MInister of Earth Science (MoS)	Sujana Chowdary (born 1961)	9 November 2014	9 March 2018	3 years, 120 days	Andhra Pradesh (Rajya Sabha)	Narendra Modi
9		Minister of Civil Aviation	Kinjarapu Ram Mohan Naidu (born 1987)	10 June 2024	Incumbent	2 years, 108 days	Srikakulam (Lok Sabha)	Narendra Modi
10		Minister of Communications (MoS)	Chandra Sekhar Pemmasani (born 1976)	10 June 2024	Incumbent	2 years, 108 days	Guntur (Lok Sabha)	Narendra Modi
10		Minister of Rural Development (MoS)	Chandra Sekhar Pemmasani (born 1976)	10 June 2024	Incumbent	2 years, 108 days	Guntur (Lok Sabha)	Narendra Modi

=== List of chief ministers of Andhra Pradesh ===
#	Portrait	Name (Lifespan)	Term in office			Assembly (Election)	Constituency	Ministry
#	Portrait	Name (Lifespan)	Assumed office	Left office	Time in office	Assembly (Election)	Constituency	Ministry
1		N. T. Rama Rao (1923–1996)	9 January 1983	16 August 1984	7 years, 195 days	7th (1983)	Tirupati	Rama Rao I
1		N. T. Rama Rao (1923–1996)	16 September 1984	9 March 1985	7 years, 195 days	7th (1983)	Tirupati	Rama Rao II
1		N. T. Rama Rao (1923–1996)	9 March 1985	2 December 1989	7 years, 195 days	8th (1985)	Hindupur	Rama Rao III
1		N. T. Rama Rao (1923–1996)	12 December 1994	1 September 1995	7 years, 195 days	10th (1994)	Hindupur	Rama Rao IV
2		N. Bhaskara Rao (born 1936)	16 August 1984	16 September 1984	31 days	7th (1983)	Vemuru	Bhaskara Rao
3		N. Chandrababu Naidu (born 1950)	1 September 1995	11 October 1999	15 years, 353 days	10th (1994)	Kuppam	Naidu I
3		N. Chandrababu Naidu (born 1950)	11 October 1999	13 May 2004	15 years, 353 days	11th (1999)	Kuppam	Naidu II
3		N. Chandrababu Naidu (born 1950)	8 June 2014	29 May 2019	15 years, 353 days	14th (2014)	Kuppam	Naidu III
3		N. Chandrababu Naidu (born 1950)	9 June 2024	Incumbent	15 years, 353 days	16th (2024)	Kuppam	Naidu IV

=== List of deputy chief ministers of Andhra Pradesh ===
#	Portrait	Name (Lifespan)	Term in office			Assembly (Election)	Constituency	Chief Minister
#	Portrait	Name (Lifespan)	Assumed office	Left office	Time in office	Assembly (Election)	Constituency	Chief Minister
1		Nimmakayala Chinarajappa (born 1953)	8 June 2014	23 May 2019	4 years, 349 days	14th (2014)	Peddapuram	N. Chandrababu Naidu
1		K. E. Krishna Murthy (born 1938)	8 June 2014	23 May 2019	4 years, 349 days	14th (2014)	Pattikonda	N. Chandrababu Naidu

== See also ==
- Politics of India
- Elections in India
- Politics of Andhra Pradesh
- Elections in Andhra Pradesh
- List of political parties in India
