= Jagtial =

- City
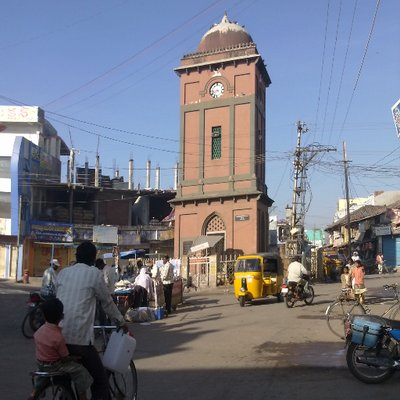
- Clock Tower, Jagtial

- Jagtial (Telangana)
- Coordinates: 18.789500°N 78.912000°E
- Country: India
- State: Telangana
- District: Jagtial
- Region: Deccan
- Founder: Jag & Tal
- Named for: Jag & Tal

Government
  - Type: Democratic
  - Body: Jagtial Municipality
  - M.L.A: M. Sanjay Kumar
  - M.P: Dharmapuri Aravind

Area
  - Total: 45 km^{2} (17 sq mi)
  - Rank: 5th rank
- Elevation: 310 m (1,020 ft)

Population (2011)
  - Total: 103,930
  - Rank: 14th in Telangana

Languages
  - Official: Telugu language, Urdu
- Time zone: UTC+5:30 (IST)
- PIN: 505327
- Telephone code: 08724
- Vehicle registration: TG-21
- Website: https://jagtialmunicipality.telangana.gov.in/

Jagtial is a city and the district headquarters of Jagtial district of Telangana state, India. Located about 190 kilometres (118 mi) north of the state capital Hyderabad, it has an average elevation of 293 metres (961 ft). According to the 2011 census, the population was 103,930.

Historical population
Year	Pop.	±%
1931	16,294	—
1941	16,294	+0.0%
1951	21,046	+29.2%
1961	20,941	−0.5%
1971	30,900	+47.6%
1981	53,213	+72.2%
1991	67,591	+27.0%
2001	85,521	+26.5%
2011	103,930	+21.5%

== Transport ==
=== Road ===
- NH 61 Bhiwandi Ahmednagar Nanded Nirmal Jagtial
- NH 63 Latur Nizamabad Jagtial Mancherial Bijapur Jagdalpur
- NH 563 Jagtial Karimnagar Warangal Khammam
- Jagtial to Peddapalli R&B Highway

==== Bus ====
TSRTC operates a bus depot in the town. The Jagtial bus depot is one of the most profitable depots owned by TGSRTC. Jagtial has direct connectivity to other major cities including Hyderabad, Vijayawada, Shirdi, Mumbai, Ongole, and Tirupati.

=== Railway ===
There is a railway station in Jagtial located at Lingampet village called Lingampet Jagtial (LPJL). It is a part of the Peddapalli-Nizamabad line.

This station is a major exporter of mangoes, maize, rice and other agricultural products. A weekly train between Lokmanya Tilak (Mumbai) and Karimnagar stops at Jagtial. Daily, a MEMU push-pull train from Nizamabad-Sirpur town runs and stops at this station.

== Education ==
=== Educational institutes ===
- JNTUH College of Engineering Jagtial, located in Nachupally Jagtial
- Prof Jayashankar Agriculture University college of Jagtial
- NAAC National Academy of Construction
- Government Medical College Jagtial
- Government Nursing College Jagtial
- SKNR Government Degree college
- Government women's Degree college
- Government Intermediate Junior College
- NSV Educational Institutions KG to PG
- SM Shubamastu Convention Hall

== Notable people ==
- Duvvasi Mohan, actor and comedian in Telugu cinema
- Venu Sriram, film director in Tollywood
- Harish Shankar, film director in Tollywood
- Alishetty Prabhakar, writer and painter
- T. Jeevan Reddy, politician, MLC,
- L. Ramana, politician from TRS Party, MLC
