= Mudhole Assembly constituency =

Constituency of the Telangana legislative assembly in India

Coordinates: 18.98°N 77.92°E

Mudhole
- Constituency No. 10 for the Telangana Legislative Assembly
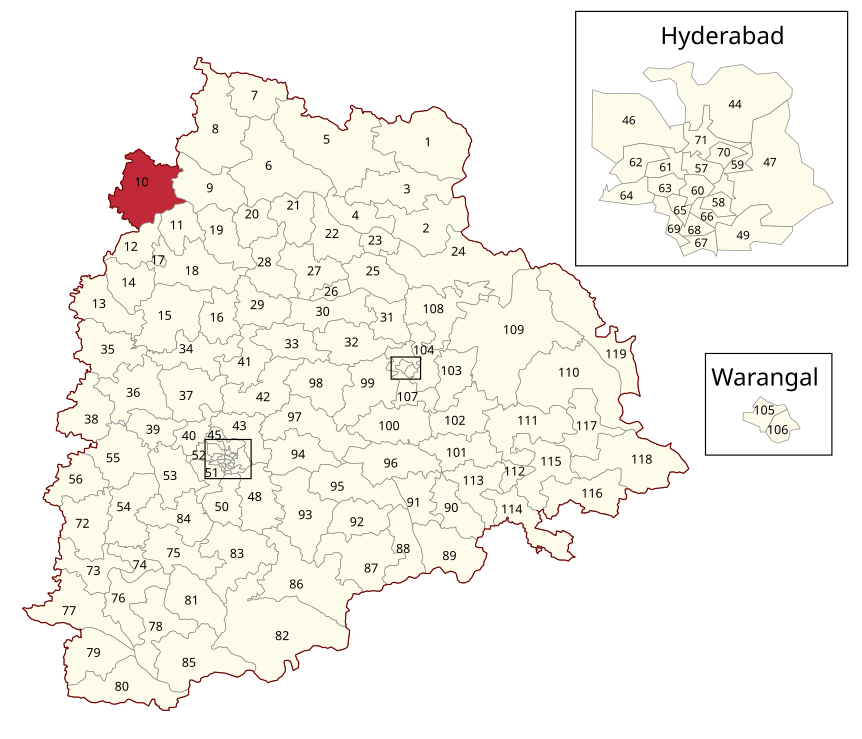
- Location of Mudhole Assembly constituency within Telangana

Constituency details
- Country: India
- Region: South India
- State: Telangana
- District: Nirmal
- Lok Sabha constituency: Adilabad
- Reservation: None

Member of Legislative Assembly
- 3rd Telangana Legislative Assembly
- Incumbent Ram Rao Pawar (P. Rama Rao Patel)
- Party: BJP
- Elected year: 2023

Mudhole Assembly constituency is a constituency in Nirmal district of Telangana that elects representatives to the Telangana Legislative Assembly in India. It is one of the seven assembly segments of Adilabad Lok Sabha constituency.

Rama Rao Pawar is the current MLA of the constituency, having won the 2023 Telangana Legislative Assembly election from Bharatiya Janata Party.

== Mandals ==
The Assembly Constituency presently comprises the following Mandals:

Mandal
Mudhole
Kuntala
Kubeer
Bhainsa
Lokeswaram
Tanoor
Basar
Narsapur G (Part)

== Members of Legislative Assembly ==
Election	Member	Political party
Andhra Pradesh
1957	Gopidi Ganga Reddy	Independent politician
1962	Gopidi Ganga Reddy	Indian National Congress
1967	G. Gaddenna	Independent politician
1972	G. Gaddenna	Indian National Congress
1978	G. Gaddenna	Indian National Congress
1983	G. Gaddenna	Indian National Congress
1985	Armoor Hanmanth Reddy	Telugu Desam Party
1989	G. Gaddenna	Indian National Congress
1994	Narayan Rao Patil Bhosle	Telugu Desam Party
1999	G. Gaddenna	Indian National Congress
2004	Narayan Rao Patil Bhosle	Telangana Rashtra Samithi
2009	Samudrala Venugopal Chary	Telugu Desam Party
Telangana
2014	Gaddigari Vittal Reddy	Indian National Congress
2018	Gaddigari Vittal Reddy	Telangana Rashtra Samithi
2023	Rama Rao Pawar	Bharatiya Janata Party

== Election results ==
=== Telangana Legislative Assembly election, 2023 ===
Telangana Assembly Elections, 2023: Mudhole (Assembly constituency)
Party	Candidate	Votes	%	±%
BJP	Rama Rao Pawar	98,252	48.59	▲26.58
BRS	Gaddigari Vittal Reddy	74,253	36.72	▼8.96
INC	Bhosle Narayan Rao Patil	15,588	7.71	▼12.15
Independent	Manmohan Jadhav	4,939	2.44	New
BSP	Vinod Kumar Sharadarao	3,292	1.63	▼0.35
NOTA	None of the Above	1,906	0.94	▼0.30
Majority		23,999	11.87	▼11.98
Turnout		2,02,202		
BJP gain from BRS		Swing		

=== Telangana Legislative Assembly election, 2018 ===
2018 Telangana Legislative Assembly election: Mudhole
Party	Candidate	Votes	%	±%
TRS	Gaddigari Vittal Reddy	83,703	45.68	
BJP	Padakanti Ramadevi	40,339	22.01	
INC	Rama Rao Pawar	36,396	19.86	
NCP	Bhosale Narayan Rao Patil	6,001	3.27	
NOTA	None of the Above	2,266	1.24	
Majority		43,331	23.85	
Turnout		1,81,696	98.7	
TRS gain from INC		Swing		

=== Telangana Legislative Assembly election, 2014 ===
Telangana Assembly Elections, 2014: Mudhole (Assembly constituency)
Party	Candidate	Votes	%	±%
INC	Gaddigari Vittal Reddy	63,322	38.88	
BJP	Padakanti Ramadevi	48,485	29.77	
TRS	Venugopala Chary Samudrala	43,540	26.73	
Majority		14,837		
Turnout		1,62,872	79.06	
INC gain from TDP		Swing		

=== Andhra Pradesh Legislative Assembly election, 2009 ===
Andhra Pradesh Assembly Elections, 2009: Mudhole (Assembly constituency)
Party	Candidate	Votes	%	±%
TDP	Venugopala Chary Samudrala	45,019	32.71	
PRP	Gaddigari Vittal Reddy	44,836	32.57	
INC	Patil Narayan Rao Bhosle	28,872	20.98	
Majority		183		

== See also ==
- List of constituencies of Telangana Legislative Assembly
