= Nsimbo District =

District in Katavi, Tanzania

Nsimbo
- District
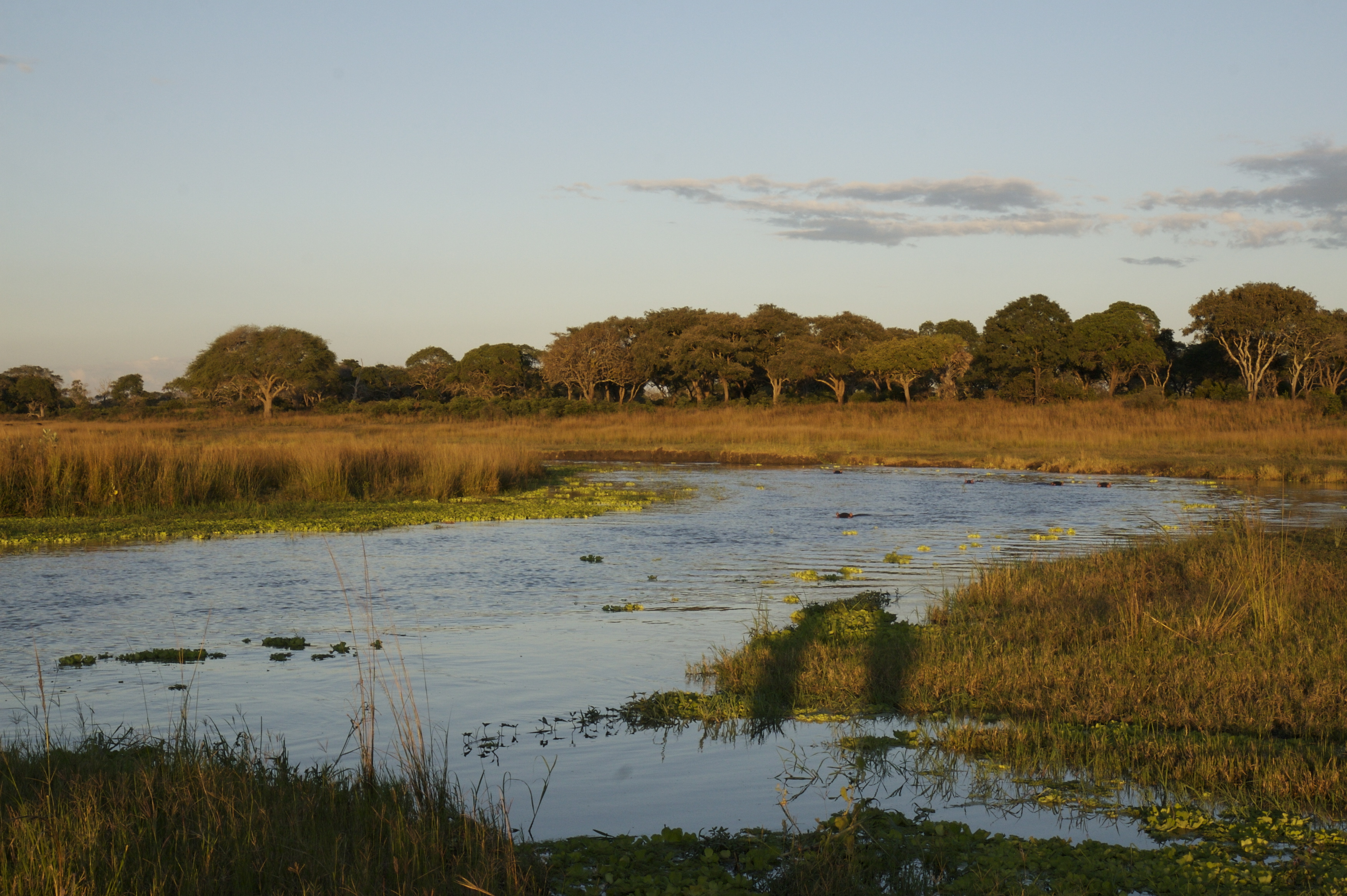
- The Katavi National Park

- Nsimbo District location in the Katavi Region
- Coordinates: 6.3727°S 31.184°E
- Country: Tanzania
- Region: Katavi Region
- District: Nsimbo District
- Established: 2012

Government
  - Type: Council
  - Chairman: Halawa Charles Malendeja
  - Director: Mohamed Ramadhani

Area
  - Total: 7,900 km^{2} (3,100 sq mi)
  - Water: 292.46 km^{2} (112.92 sq mi)
- Highest elevation: 2,500 m (8,200 ft)
- Lowest elevation: 1,000 m (3,300 ft)

Population (2022)
  - Total: 201,102
  - Density: 25/km^{2} (66/sq mi)
- Time zone: UTC+3 (EAT)
- Postcode: 50xxx
- Area code: 025
- Website: District Website

Nsimbo District is a district council in the Katavi Region of Tanzania's Southern Highlands established in 2012. The district lies in the middle of the region east of the city of Mpanda. It is a tropical environment of mostly forest reserves and agricultural economy.

== History ==
Originally, Nsimbo was a part of both the Tabora Region and Mbeya Regions. In 1973, the Rukwa Regional Council was created from parts of those two regions, and in 1983 the Mpanda District Council was created within Rukwa. In 1990 the town of Mpanda split off from the district council to create a separate town council.

In 2012, The Katavi Region split off from the Rukwa Region, with the 4 districts of Mpanda District, Mpanda Town, and a new district councils of Mlele District and Nsimbo District. In 2015 the Mpanda Town Council was promoted to a municipal council, and in 2016 the portions of Mlele to the south of Nsimbo would be split off to form the Mpimbwe District Council.

== Geography ==
The Nsimbo District lies in the middle of the Katavi Region east of the city of Mpanda. The Katavi districts of Mpanda District and Mpanda Municipality lie to the west, Mlele District is to the east, and Mpimbwe District is south of Nsimbo. North is the Kaliua District of the Tabora Region, and south-west is the Nkasi District of the Rukwa Region.

The district covers an area of 14,623 square kilometres (5,646 sq mi). Most of the district is protected forest reserve with 8,920.03 km^{2} (3,444.04 sq mi) of protected forest. The elevation varies between 1,000 m (3,300 ft) to 2,500 m (8,200 ft). Within the district is much of the Katavi National Park and Ugalla River Forest Reserve which overlaps with the Ugalla River National Park into the Tabora Region.

=== Climate ===
The districts climate is tropical savanna climate with the Aw Koppen-Geiger system classification. The average temperature is 23 °C (73 °F) with an average rainfall of 1,093 millimetres (43.0 in).

=== Administrative divisions ===
Nsimbo has two division, 12 wards, and 59 villages and 272 hamlets.

Wards (2016 population)

- Ibindi (6,046)
- Itenka (18,348)
- Kanoge (17,954)
- Kapalala (5,130)
- Katumba (27,239)
- Litapunga (35,444)
- Machimboni (4,621)
- Mtapenda (5,475)
- Nsimbo (8,085)
- Sitalike (10,969)
- Ugalla (11,352)
- Urwila (6,970)

== Demographics ==
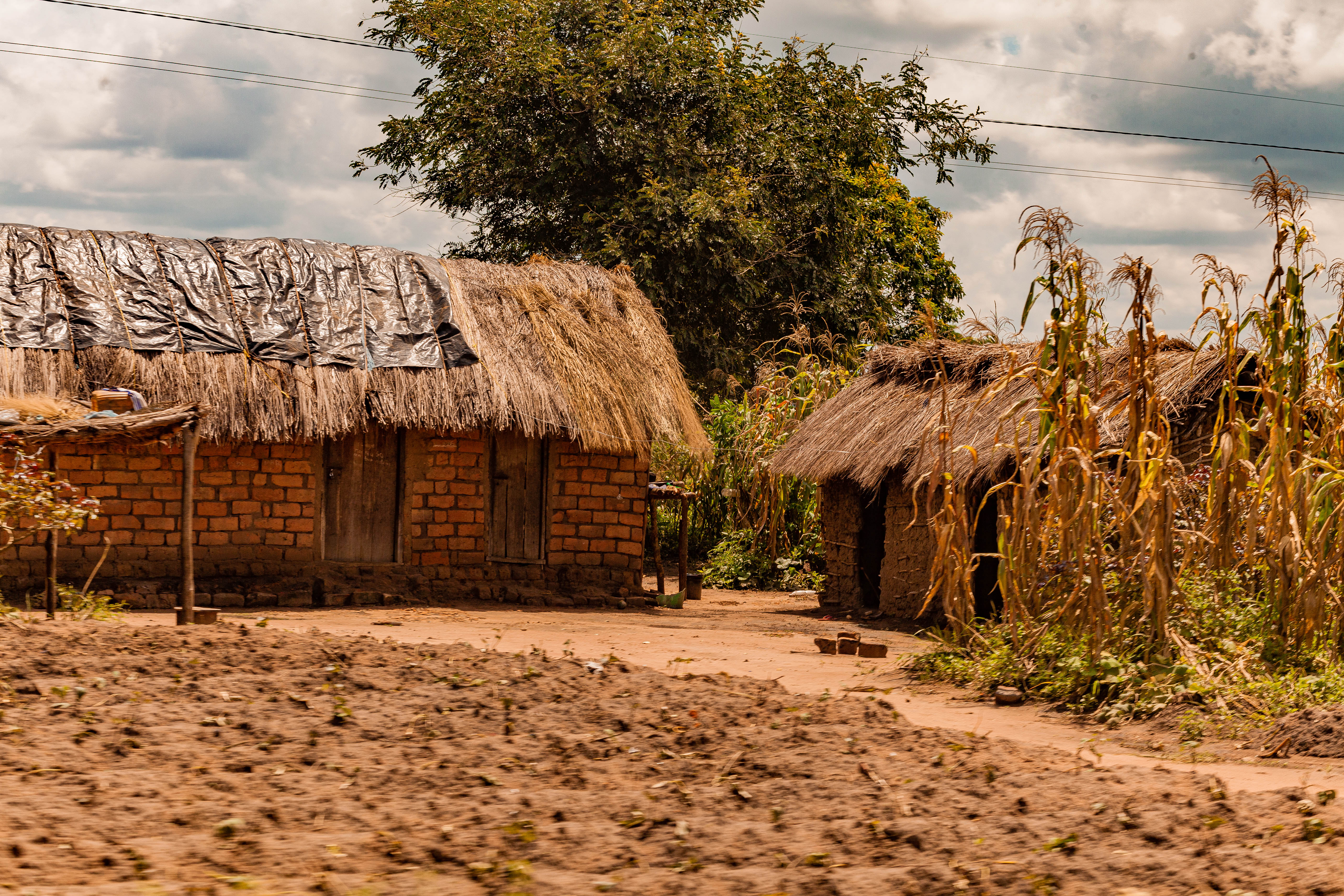
A Makuti house in Nsimbo

In 2016 the Tanzania National Bureau of Statistics report there were 157,633 people in the district, from 144,245 in 2012. Wabende, Wakonongo, Wafipa, Wapimbwe, Bahutu, Wachanga, and Basukuma make up the people. In 2022 the population was 201,102.

== Economy ==
The economy is primarily agriculture. Food crops grown are cassava, maize, paddy, sweet potatoes, Potatoes, bananas, yams, and other fruits and vegetables. Crops grown for money are tobacco, peanuts, sunflowers, sesame, and sugarcane.

There are no large or medium scale industries or mining operations in the district, but locals do small scale mining of gold, copper, silver, lead, tungsten, rose quarts, and nitre.

== Health and education ==
Nsimbo has 3 health centers, and 18 health clinics. There are 47 primary schools, and 8 secondary schools in the district.
