= Mpimbwe District =

District in Katavi, Tanzania

Mpimbwe
- District
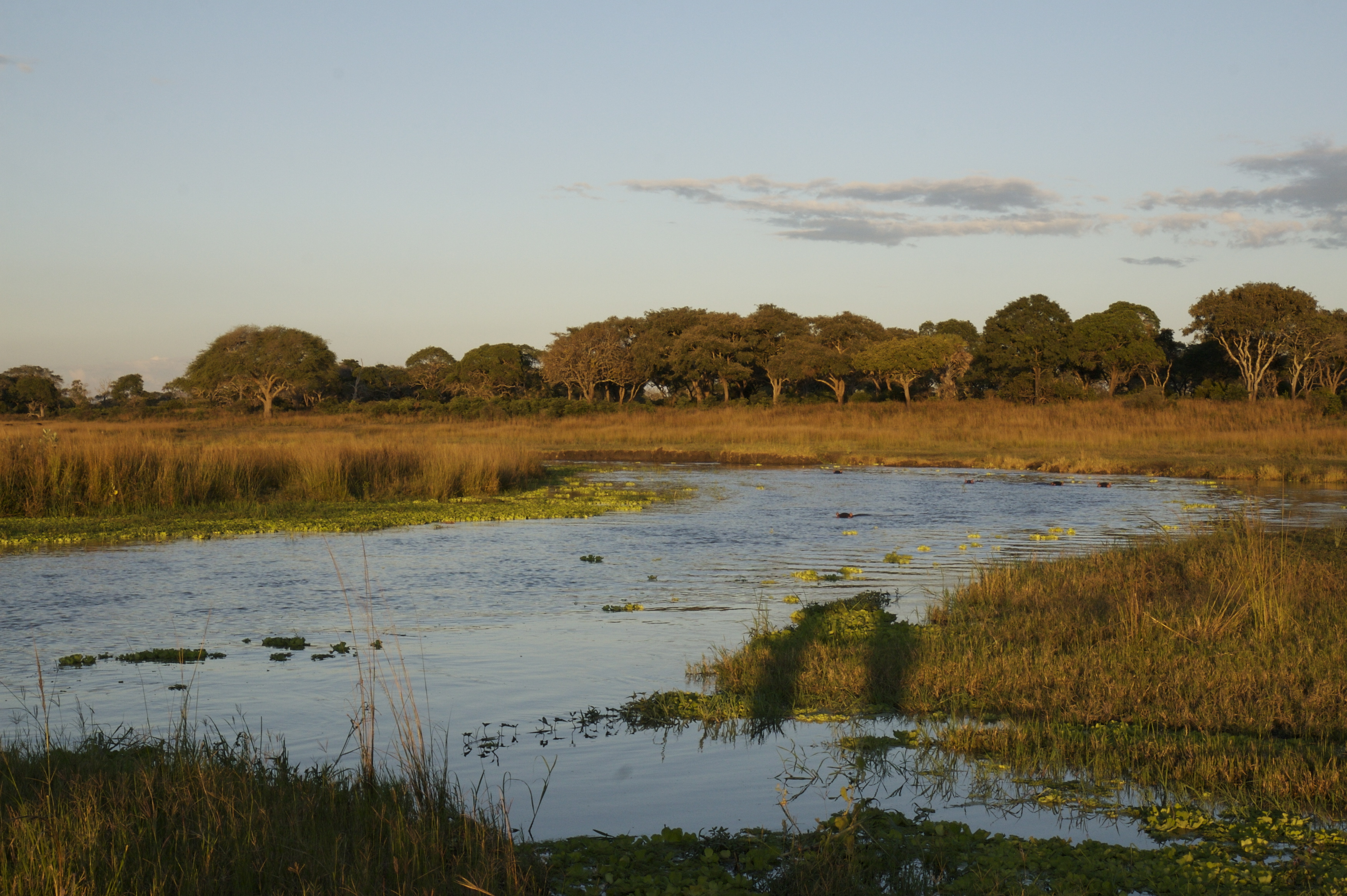
- The Katavi National Park

- Mpimbwe District location in the Katavi Region
- Coordinates: 7.175°S 31.787°E
- Country: Tanzania
- Region: Katavi Region
- District: Mpimbwe District
- Established: 2016

Government
  - Type: Council
  - Chairman: Silas R. Ilumba
  - Director: Catherine M. Mashalla

Area
  - Total: 7,704.84 km^{2} (2,974.86 sq mi)
  - Water: 39.44 km^{2} (15.23 sq mi)
- Elevation: 1,250 m (4,100 ft)

Population (2022)
  - Total: 215,438
  - Density: 27.9614/km^{2} (72.4197/sq mi)
- Time zone: UTC+3 (EAT)
- Postcode: 50xxx
- Area code: 025
- Website: District Website

Mpimbwe District is a district council in the Katavi Region of Tanzania's Southern Highlands established in 2012. The district lies in the south of the region on Lake Rukwa.

== History ==
The district was established in 2016 from the Mlele District Council. The Mlele District had been created 4 years prior from the Mpanda District Council in 2012. The same year, the Katavi Region was created by splitting off from the Rukwa Region which it had been a part of since its creation in 1974. Prior to 1974, and throughout colonization, it had been a part of the Tabora Region.

== Geography ==
Mpimbwe District lies in the south of the Katavi Region with the Katavi districts of Nsimbo District in the north, and Mlele in the east. The Songwe District of the Songwe Region is the south-east. Rukwa Region's districts of Sumbawanga to the south along the shores Lake Rukwa with the Nkasi District to the south-east. The district covers an area of 7,704.84 square kilometres (2,974.86 sq mi).

=== Climate ===
The districts climate is tropical savanna climate with the Aw Koppen-Geiger system classification. The average temperature is 23.2 °C (73.8 °F) with an average rainfall of 828 millimetres (32.6 in).

=== Administrative divisions ===
Mpimbwe has two division, 9 wards, and 31 villages and 168 hamlets.

Wards (2016 population)

- Chamalendi (8,747)
- Ikuba (9,084)
- Kasansa (9,025)
- Kibaoni (14,102)
- Majimoto (20,674)
- Mamba (24,520)
- Mbede (11,993)
- Mwamapuli (9,745)
- Usevya (10,042)

== Demographics ==
In 2022 the Tanzania National Bureau of Statistics report there were 215,438 people in the district, from 103,165 in 2012. People of the district are mostly of the tribes of Wasukuma at 60%, and Wapimbwe at 20%. There are smaller populations of Wafipa, Wabende, Wangoni, Wachagga.

The Wapimbwe are native to the area, while the Wasukuma started to settled the area in the 1970.

== Economy ==
Small scale farming is the dominant economic activity with 95% of the population. Cassava, paddy and maize are the main crops grown for food, with groundnuts, paddy and maize being grown for cash. In 2016 there were 39,883 cattle, 30,235 goats, 8,206 sheep, 2,650 pigs, 80,600 imported chickens, and 236,232 native chickens.

== Education ==
There are 29 primary schools in the districts teaching 20,308 students, of whom 10,049 are girls and 10,259 are boys. The district has 4 secondary schools teaching 1,612 of whom 638 are girls and 974 are boys. The district has 1 College (Mizengo Pinda Campus College-SUA), which provide Bachelor in Bee Resources Management, Diploma in Crop production and Certificate in Tourism and Hunting, college capacity holding more than 300 students

== Health ==
The district has high food insecurity and illnesses. Msalala has 2 health centers and 10 clinics. In 2016, 42% of the rural population had safe and reliable clean water. The maternal morality ratio is 58/100,000 mothers, compared to the 3/100,000 national ratio.

== Wildlife ==
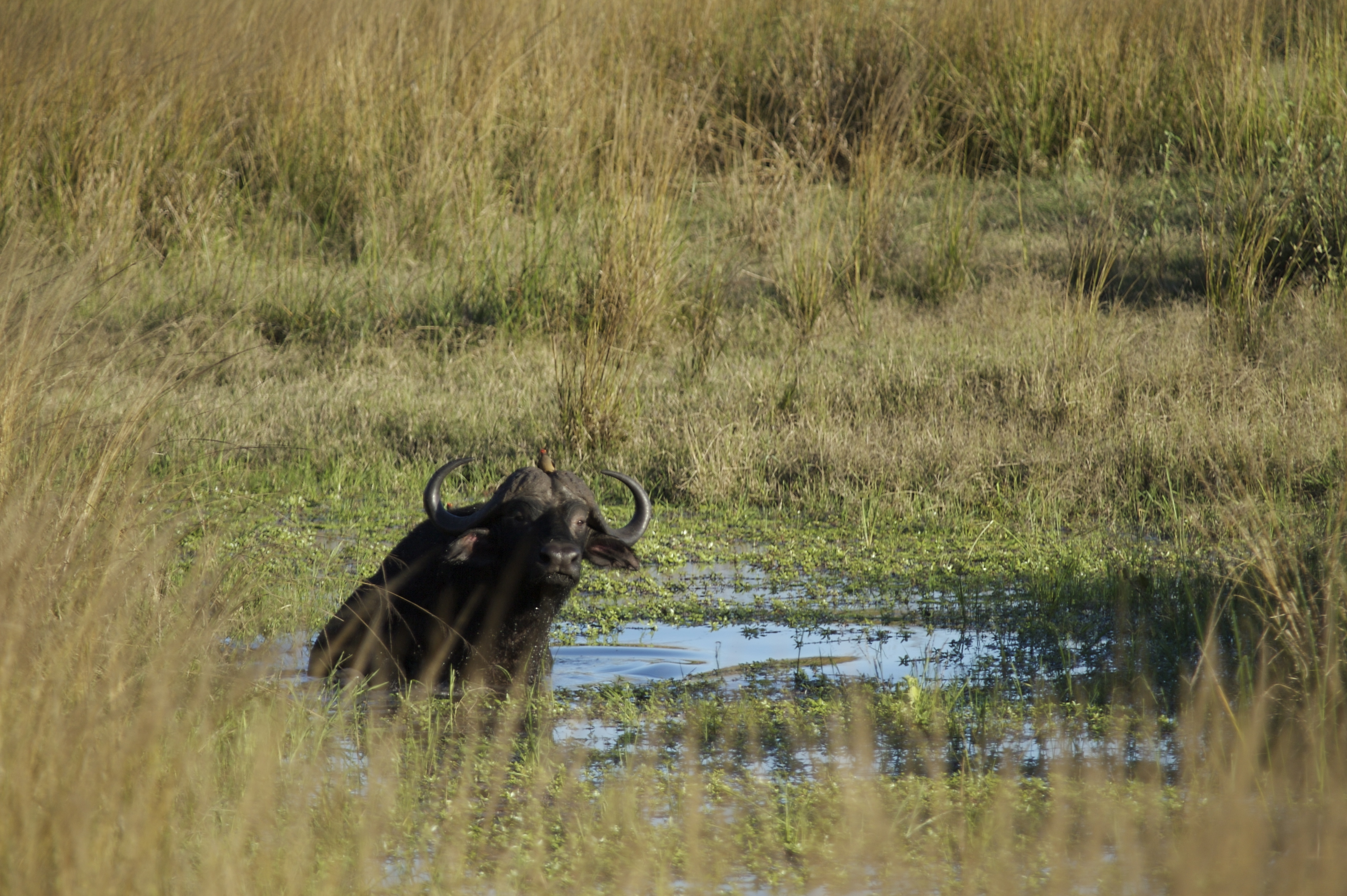
Buffalo, Katavi

Some of the wild animals of the Mpimbwe District are elephants, lions, hippopotamus, hyena, buffalos, giraffes, and pigs. The Katavi National Park and Rukwa Game Reserve are located in, and adjacent, to the district.

There still exist conflicts with wildlife, but it is decreasing with very little livestock loss to lions or hyena today.

== Roads ==
Masala District has no paved roads in 2016. It had 54.6 kilometres (33.9 mi) of gravel road, and 653.81 km^{2} (252.44 sq mi) of dirt road for a total road network of 708.41 km (440.19 mi). Of the road network, 205.2 km (127.5 mi) is usable all year.
