= Antahpragnya =

Indian rural technical festival

- Date(s): 31-01-2020 to 02-02-2020
- Frequency: 1 Year
- Venue: RGUKT Basar
- Country: India
- Years active: 2014,2015,2016,2017,2018,2020
- Attendance: 50000

Antahpragnya is an Indian rural technology festival organized by the Rajiv Gandhi University of Knowledge Technologies (RGUKT) in Basara, Nirmal District of Telangana. The festival's name, derived from Sanskrit roots "antah" (deep) and "pragnya" (wisdom), means "inner wisdom" The festival is intended for students, researchers, and professionals to demonstrate technical skills, creativity, and problem-solving abilities through projects, competitions, working models, and other activities to provide advances in artificial intelligence, smart robotics, automation, sustainable energy, and the creation of intelligent systems.

Antahpragnya has gained considerable fame due to its the combination of technical exhibitions, workshops, cultural activities, and entrepreneurial events.

== History ==
According to The Hindu, students at Antahpragnya 2020 showcased innovative working models during the three-day event, which was described as India’s largest campus-based technical festival. The event was inaugurated by Nirmal District Collector M. Prashanthi, who emphasized the need for smart villages and encouraged students to develop innovations with humanitarian applications.

One of the featured events at Antahpragnya 2020 was a "Campus Farming" competition involving around 250 engineering students. The university allocated 1.5 acres of land for the contest, where participants cultivated spinach using farming tools developed by fellow RGUKT students. Competitors came from various engineering disciplines, including mechanical, civil, metallurgy, chemical, electrical, electronics, and computer science. According to The New Indian Express, the competition was judged by 150 local farmers.

In addition to the campus farming initiative, Antahpragnya 2020 included more than 200 events, such as robo racing, robo soccer, virtual reality gaming, workshops on artificial intelligence and the Internet of Things, and a National Science Fair. The programme also included an "Ideal Village" project focused on applying technology to rural development. According to Business Standard, the three-day event attracted nearly 50,000 attendees and presented over 300 prototype working models created by approximately 4,000 RGUKT-Basar students.
