= Mpanda Airport =

Airport in Katavi Region, Tanzania

Mpanda Airport Uwanja wa Ndege wa Mpanda (Swahili)
- IATA: NPY; ICAO: HTMP

Summary
- Airport type: Public
- Owner: Government of Tanzania
- Operator: Tanzania Airports Authority
- Location: Mpanda, Tanzania
- Elevation AMSL: 3,565 ft / 1,087 m
- Coordinates: 6°21′20″S 31°4′50″E
- Website: www.taa.go.tz

Map
- Location of airport in Tanzania

Runways
Direction	Length		Surface
Direction	m	ft	Surface
09/27	2,005	6,578	Asphalt

Statistics (2024)
- Passengers: 15,323
- Aircraft movements: 392
- Cargo (tonnes): 12
- Sources: TAA GCM TCAA Google Maps

Mpanda Airport (IATA: NPY, ICAO: HTMP) is an airport in western Tanzania serving the town of Mpanda and the surrounding Katavi Region. It is on the southeastern side of the town. The UN Refugee Agency UNHCR helped the Government of Tanzania to finance the upgrade of the airstrip into an airport as a gesture of its appreciation for hosting Burundian refugees for more than 30 years.

The airport was officially opened by the Tanzanian Vice President Mohamed Gharib Bilal on 24 November 2012. The airport will help improve access to the Katavi National Park.

== Airlines and destinations ==
Airlines	Destinations
Air Tanzania	Dar es Salaam, Tabora
Auric Air	Kigoma, Mwanza

== See also ==
- List of airports in Tanzania
- Transport in Tanzania
