= Ikola =

Ikola may refer to:

== Geography ==
- Ikola, Finland, a former village in the former municipality Kivennapa, Finland
- Ikola, Tanzania, a ward in Mpanda District, Tanzania

== People with the surname ==
- Heikki Ikola (born 1947), Finnish biathlete
- Willard Ikola (1932–2025), American ice hockey player
