= Konongo =

Konongo may refer to:

- Konongo people, an ethnolinguistic group in Tanzania
- Konongo, Ghana, a town in Ghana's Ashanti region
