= Ugalla =

Ugalla Ugalla
- town and ward
- Location in Tanzania
- Coordinates: 05°47′07″S 031°09′54″E
- Country: Tanzania
- Region: Katavi
- District: Mlele
- Time zone: UTC+3 (GMT)
- UFI: -2574200

Ugalla is a small town and ward in Mlele District of Katavi Region, Tanzania, East Africa. The town is on the left (west) bank of the Mtambo River just before it flows into the Ugalla River, on the edge of the Lujaba Swamp.

== Villages ==
In addition to the town of Ugalla, the ward contains the following villages:

- Iseka
- Kamini
- Kankusha
- Kasisi (A & B)
- Kasulo
- Katamike
- Lyogelo
- Mjimwema
- Mnyamasi (A & B)
- Mtambalala
- Sikwisi
- Uvuvini
- Vigaeni
- Mihawa
- Mihama saba
- Utemini
