= Gaddigari Vittal Reddy =

Indian politician (born 1954)

Member of the Telangana Legislative Assembly
- In office 2014–2022
- Constituency: Mudhole Assembly constituency

Personal details
- Party: Telangana Rashtra Samithi (2014–present)
- Other political affiliations: Indian National Congress
- Other Positions: 2019 – 2023: Member of Committee on Welfare of Women, Children, Disabled and Old-aged of Telangana

Gaddigari Vittal Reddy (born 1954) is an Indian politician from Telangana. He served as the Member of the Telangana Legislative Assembly from Mudhole Assembly constituency. He is a two-time MLA who was first elected in 2014 and served a second term elected from 2018. He contested as a BRS candidate in the 2023 Telangana Legislative Assembly election from the same constituency but lost to the Bharatiya Janata Party candidate Rama Rao Pawar by 23,999 votes.

== Early life and education ==
According to his election affidavit in 2023 his is age 69 years. His father name Gaddigari Gaddenna. He graduated in LLB from the Osmania University, Hyderabad 1980, and Graduation Badruka College at Hyderabad

== Election performance ==
Telangana Election Results
Year	Party	Votes	Vote %	Result
2014	Indian National Congress	63,322	39.3	Won
2018	Telangana Rashtra Samithi	83,933	46.2	Won
2023	Bharat Rashtra Samithi	74,253	36.7	Lost
