= Rama Rao Pawar =

Indian politician

Member of the Telangana Legislative Assembly
- Incumbent
- Assumed office 2023
- Preceded by: Gaddigari Vittal Reddy

Personal details
- Party: Bharatiya Janata Party

Rama Rao Pawar (born 1954) is an Indian politician from Telangana state. He is an MLA from Mudhole Assembly constituency in Nirmal district. He represents Bharatiya Janata Party and won the 2023 Telangana Legislative Assembly election.

== Early life and education ==
Pawar is from Mudhole, Nirmal district. His father's name is Shyam Rav Patel Pawar. He is a businessman. He completed his B.Sc. in 1976 at Dharmavant Science and Arts College, Yakutpura, Hyderabad, which is affiliated with Osmania University.He has two sons

== Career ==
Pawar won from Mudhole Assembly constituency representing Bharatiya Janata Party. He polled 98,252 votes and defeated his nearest rival, Gaddigari Vittal Reddy of Bharat Rashtra Samithi, by a margin of 23, 999 votes. In the 2018 Telangana Legislative Assembly election, he lost the Mudhole seat representing Indian National Congress.
