= Elegaon =

- Village
- Location in Telangana, India Elegaon (India)
- Coordinates: 19.060232°N 77.918322°E
- Country: India
- State: Telangana
- District: Adilabad
- Mandal: Bhainsa
- Elevation: 363 m (1,191 ft)

Population (2001)
  - Total: 3,000

Languages
  - Official: Telugu, Marathi
- Time zone: UTC+5:30 (IST)
- PIN: 504102
- Telephone code: 08752
- Vehicle registration: TS
- Website: telangana.gov.in

Elegaon is a village located in Bhainsa Mandal in the Adilabad district of Telangana State in India. It has a population of around 3000. Elegaon Gram panchayat contains 10 wards and two neighboring villages, Badgaon and Sirala.

== Demographics ==
As this village comes under the Telangana state (well known as under developed region of this state), it is a backward area. At least half of the people are illiterate. This village has around 3500 people.

== Agriculture ==
Major crops:

1. Rice
2. Cotton
3. Chilly
4. Mung (Pesara)
5. Blackgram (Minumu)
6. Jowar (Jonna)
7. Corn (Mokka Jonna)
8. Groundnut
9. Pigeon pea (Thogari in local slang)
10. Soybean
