= Kaddam =

Kaddam or Kadam may refer to:

- Kaddam, Adilabad district, Telangana, India
- Kaddam Project, a reservoir on the Kadem River, Nirmal District
- Kadam river, a river Adilabad district
