= Geophrey Mizengo Pinda =

Tanzanian politician

Honorable Geophrey Mizengo Pinda MP

Deputy Minister for Legal and Constitution Affairs
- In office 2020–2023
- President: John Magufuli; Samia Suluhu
- Succeeded by: Pauline Gekul

Member of Parliament
- Incumbent
- Assumed office November 2020
- Preceded by: Mizengo Pinda
- Constituency: Kavuu Constituency

Deputy Minister for Lands, Housing and Human Settlement Development
- Incumbent
- Assumed office 2023
- President: Samia Suluhu
- Succeeded by: Ridhiwan Kikwete

Personal details
- Born: Geophrey Mizengo Pinda; 26 January 1963 (age 63) Katavi Region
- Party: Chama Cha Mapinduzi
- Education: Ndurumo Primary School; Mgulani JKT Secondary School
- Alma mater: Centre for Foreign Relations; Moshi Cooperative College; Open University of Tanzania
- Occupation: Civil Servant
- Profession: Lawyer

Military service
- Allegiance: United Rep. of Tanzania
- Branch/service: Tanzania People's Defence Force
- Years of service: 1989-2018
- Duration: 29 years

Geophrey Mizengo Pinda (born 26 January, 1963), is a Tanzanian politician and deputy minister for Lands, Housing and Human Settlement Development and presently serving as the Chama Cha Mapinduzi's member of parliament for Kavuu constituency in Katavi Region since November 2020. He was the former deputy minister for Constitutional and Legal Affairs.
