= Ratnam V. Raja Kumar =

Indian academic

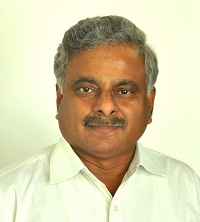
- Born: Machilipatnam
- Citizenship: India
- Education: Indian Institute of Technology Kharagpur, Andhra University

Ratnam V. Raja Kumar is an Indian academic who served as the director of the Indian Institute of Technology Bhubaneswar. He has served as the first vice-chancellor of Rajiv Gandhi University of Knowledge Technologies.

== Biography ==
Raja Kumar was born in Machilipatnam, India. He received his BE degree from Andhra University, and his M.Tech. and Ph.D. in electronics and communication engineering in 1982 and 1987 respectively, from Indian Institute of Technology Kharagpur. He joined IIT Kharagpur as a professor in 1984, and served as the Dean of Academic Affairs from 2003 to 2006. He later served as the vice-chancellor of Rajiv Gandhi University of Knowledge Technologies from 2010 to 2015. His research areas include digital signal processing, wireless communications, detection and estimation and VLSI systems for communications.
