= Sirala =

Coordinates: 19°04′N 77°54′E

Sirala is a village located in the Nirmal district of the state Telangana, India.
