= Mizengo Pinda =

Tanzanian politician

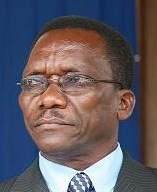

9th Prime Minister of Tanzania
- In office 9 February 2008 – 5 November 2015
- President: Jakaya Kikwete
- Preceded by: Edward Lowassa
- Succeeded by: Kassim Majaliwa

Minister of State for Regional Administration and Local Government
- In office 6 January 2006 – 9 February 2008
- Prime Minister: Edward Lowassa
- Preceded by: Hassan Ngwilizi
- Succeeded by: Stephen Wasira

Deputy State Minister for Regional Administration & Local Government
- In office 2000–2005
- President: Benjamin Mkapa

Member of Parliament for Katavi
- In office October 2000 – 2015
- Succeeded by: Geophrey Mizengo Pinda

5th Chancellor of Open University of Tanzania
- Incumbent
- Assumed office 2016
- President: John Magufuli
- Preceded by: Asha-Rose Migiro

Personal details
- Born: Mizengo Kayanza Peter Pinda; 12 August 1948 (age 78) Mpanda, Rukwa, Tanganyika Territory (now Mpanda, Katavi Region, Tanzania)
- Party: CCM
- Spouse: Tunu Pinda
- Children: 4
- Education: University of Dar es Salaam

Mizengo Kayanza Peter Pinda (born 12 August 1948) is a Tanzanian CCM politician who was the 11th prime minister of Tanzania from 2008 to 2015. He was a Member of Parliament from 2000 to 2015.

== Life and career ==
Pinda was born in the former northern Rukwa Region which is now Mpanda District of Katavi Region. He holds a degree in law from the University of Dar es Salaam, which he earned in 1974.

He was assistant private secretary to the president from 1982 to 1992 and clerk to the cabinet from 1996 to 2000. He was elected as a Member of Parliament for Mpanda East constituency in the 2000 general election, and he also became Deputy Minister in the Prime Minister's Office for Regional Administration and Local Governments in 2000. He was promoted to the rank of Minister in the Prime Minister's Office, while remaining in charge of regional administration and local governments, in the Cabinet named on January 4, 2006.

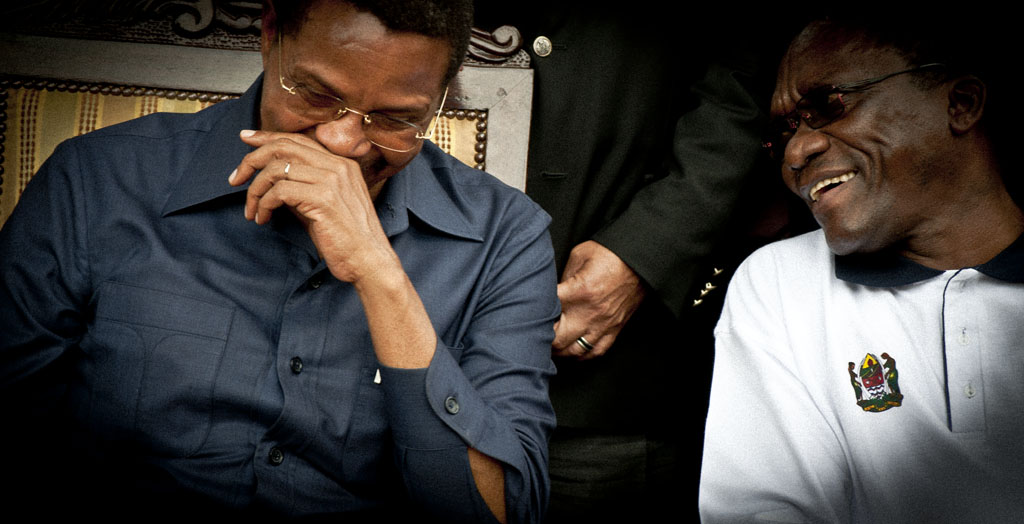
President Kikwete shares a light moment with Prime Minister Pinda

Pinda was nominated as prime minister by President Jakaya Kikwete on February 8, 2008, after the resignation of Edward Lowassa over allegations of corruption. He was confirmed nearly unanimously by the Tanzanian parliament on the same day, with 279 votes in favor, two opposed, and one spoiled vote. Pinda was sworn in as prime minister at Chamwino State House in Dodoma on February 9. Kikwete announced the new Cabinet headed by Pinda on February 12; it was notably smaller than the previous Cabinet, with 26 ministers, as opposed to 29 in the previous Cabinet, and 21 deputy ministers, as opposed to 31 in the previous Cabinet.

Amidst criticism and international concern about high levels of corruption in Tanzania, Pinda declared his assets on January 14, 2010. He said that he had "three small houses [and] no shares in any company", and that in his bank accounts he kept less than $20,000. Pinda also stated that his only car was "the one loaned to me as a Member of Parliament".

On November 27, 2014, Pinda was pressured to resign over alleged fraudulent payments worth $120 million (£76m) to an energy firm and top officials.

In 2015, he unsuccessfully sought to be nominated as the CCM's presidential candidate. He announced in July 2015 that he would not seek re-election as MP for Katavi.

He is the current chancellor of the Open University of Tanzania (OUT) since 2016, appointed by President John Magufuli.

Political offices
| Preceded by Edward Lowassa | Prime Minister of Tanzania; 2008–2015 | Succeeded by Majaliwa K. Majaliwa |
