= Nandagiri =

- town
- Location in Telangana, India
- Coordinates: 18°38′N 79°02′E
- Country: India
- State: Telangana

Languages
  - Official: Telugu
- Time zone: UTC+5:30 (IST)

Nandagiri is the name of several places in India. It is a village in Telangana, a suburb of Hyderabad.

== Village ==
The village Nandagiri is in Jagtial district of Telangana state. It has three temples nearby. The distance between Karimnagar and Nandagiri nearly 35 km. 28 km from Jagtial. Agriculture is the major occupation in this village, and although Kakatiya canal is flowing through the village, it only irrigates 5 to 6 percent of the lands.

The total population of the village stands at around 3,000 people (2011 census). In the 2014 elections, 1,700 voters used their vote. This village comes under DHARMAPURI(MLA) & PEDDAPALLI(MP) consistencies.

Nandagiri Veerabhadra temple is a famous temple in this village. Every year during Ekadashi they conduct celebrations in this temple.

TSRTC provided 5 buses to connect this village (LINGAPUR, CHILVAKODUR, PEDDAPALLI, DEEKONDA, KOTLA)

In this village, all political parties like TRS, Congress, BJP have individual cader. Grampanchayath office located in the middle of the village. It includes granite mines but no benefit for village revenue.

== History ==
It is said that King Satakarni (241 BC), the son of King Sreemukha of Satavahana dynasty, while going on Jaithra Yathra (victory lap) from Paithan (Prathistanapuram, present Aurangabad in Maharashtra state), made a halt at Nandagiri village and constructed a Gagana Mandiram (Sky Palace) on the top of the hillock. Its ruins are visible even now. Later on, it is said that the 17th king in the Satavahana Dynasty, King Hala (who wrote "Gatha Saptha Shathi") and his wife resided at Nandagiri. Even though the Satavahana kings practiced Vedic religions, they also patronized Jainism and Buddhism and hence earned name Eka Brahmana. They constructed temples as per the Advaitha culture on the advice of Vedic scholars. Satakarni family origins come from Ikshvaku Dynasties of Ancient India and were part of Ramayana and Mahabharata era.

== Hyderabad ==
Nandagiri hills (Jubilee Hills) is a suburb of the city of Hyderabad, Telangana.

== Hill Fort near Bangalore ==
Nandagiri in Karnataka is the famous Nandidurg, which was captured by Lord Cornwallis on his march to Seringapatam. From early times the Ganga Princes possessed the title of "Nandigiri Lords." The origin of this place may be found in the tradition that Vishnu Vardhana of the Eastern Chalukyas dynasty settled at Dharmapuri on the western bank of the Godavari River. Four hundred villages or towns became subject to him. His son was Nandu, who built a town called Nandagiri, in which the four castes of Hindus were located.

Nandagiri was changed into Nandi-Giri by the Cholas in the 11th century, and it means the hill of Nandi - the name of the sacred bull of Siva.

Nandagiri was ruled by a Bijialudu in the sixth century CE. He constructed the Saraswathi temple at Basar. In the 17th century, the idols of the temple were reinstated by a chieftain of Nandagiri (Nanded) subsequent to the destruction caused by the Muslim invaders.
