= Gnana Saraswati Temple =

Hindu temple in Telangana, India

Gnana Saraswati Temple శ్రీ జ్ఞాన సరస్వతి దేవస్థానము
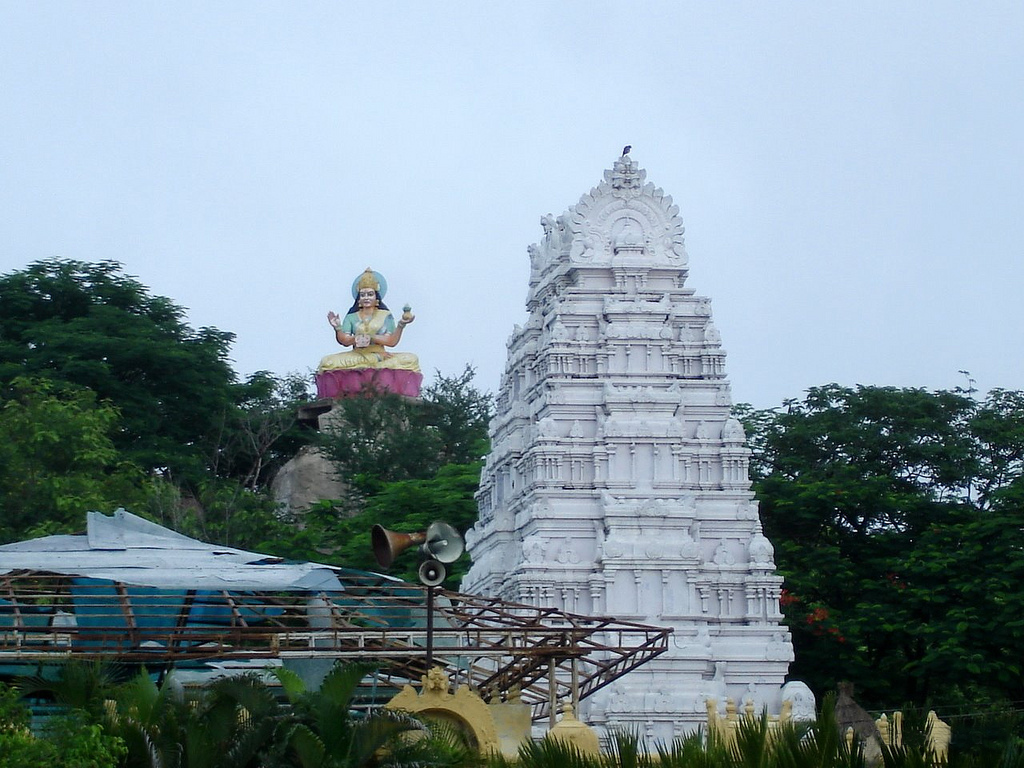

- Location in Telangana Gnana Saraswati Temple (India)

Religion
- Affiliation: Hinduism
- District: Nirmal
- Deity: Saraswati
- Festival: Saraswati Puja

Location
- Location: Basara
- State: Telangana
- Country: India
- Coordinates: 18°52′40″N 77°57′23″E

Architecture
- Type: South Indian
- Elevation: 579 m (1,900 ft)

Gnana Saraswati Temple (Telugu: శ్రీ జ్ఞాన సరస్వతి దేవస్థానము) is a Hindu temple of Goddess Saraswati located on the banks of Godavari River at Basara, Telangana, India. It is one of the two famous Saraswati temples in the Indian subcontinent, the other being Sharada Peeth. Saraswati is the Hindu Goddess of knowledge and learning. Children are brought to the temple for the learning ceremony called as Akshara abyasam.

Basara is a census town in the Nirmal district in the state of Telangana. It is about 30 km (19 mi) from Bhainsa,15.5 km (10 mi) from Dharmabad, 34.8 km (22 mi) from Nizamabad, 96.0 km (60 mi) from Nanded, 70 km (43 mi) from district headquarters Nirmal, and 205 km (127 mi) from Hyderabad.

== History ==
According to Mahabharatha, Maharishi Vyas and his disciples and sage Viswamitra decided to settle down in a cool and serene atmosphere after the Kurukshetra War. In the quest for a peaceful abode, he came to Dandaka forest and, pleased with serenity of the region, selected this place. Since Maharishi Vyasa spent considerable time in prayers, the place was then called "Vasara" and turned into Basara due to the influence of the Marathi language in this region.

It is also believed that this temple is one of the three temples constructed near the confluence of the Manjira and Godavari rivers.

Historically, 'Bijialudu' a Karnataka king, who ruled the province of Nandagiri with Nanded as his capital in the sixth century, constructed the temple at Basara. In the 17th century, the idols of the temple were reinstated by a chieftain of Nandagiri (Nanded) subsequent to destruction caused by Muslim invaders.

== Modern period ==
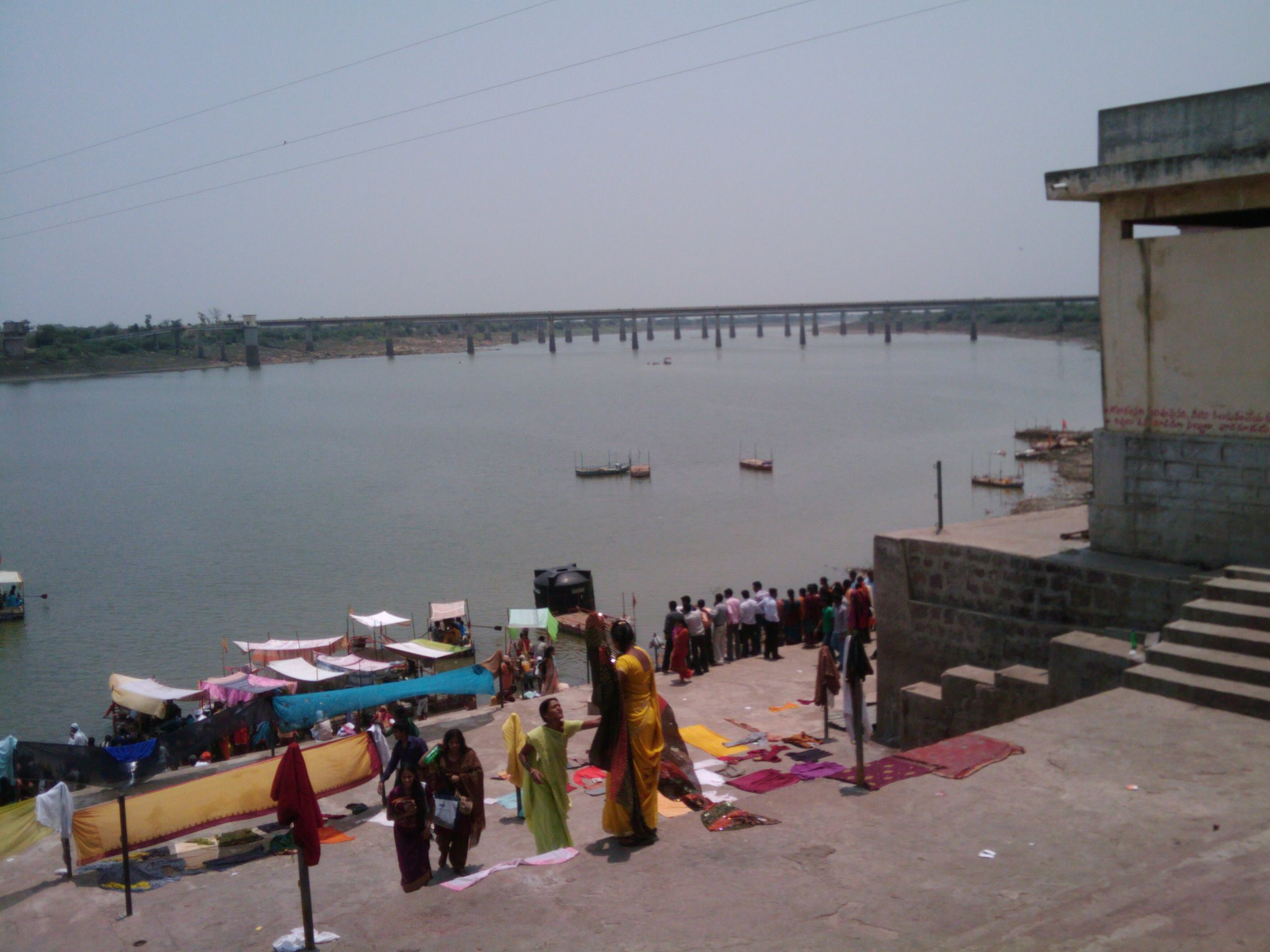
Photo of the river Godavari, behind/adjacent to the temple, taken on 30 April 2011.

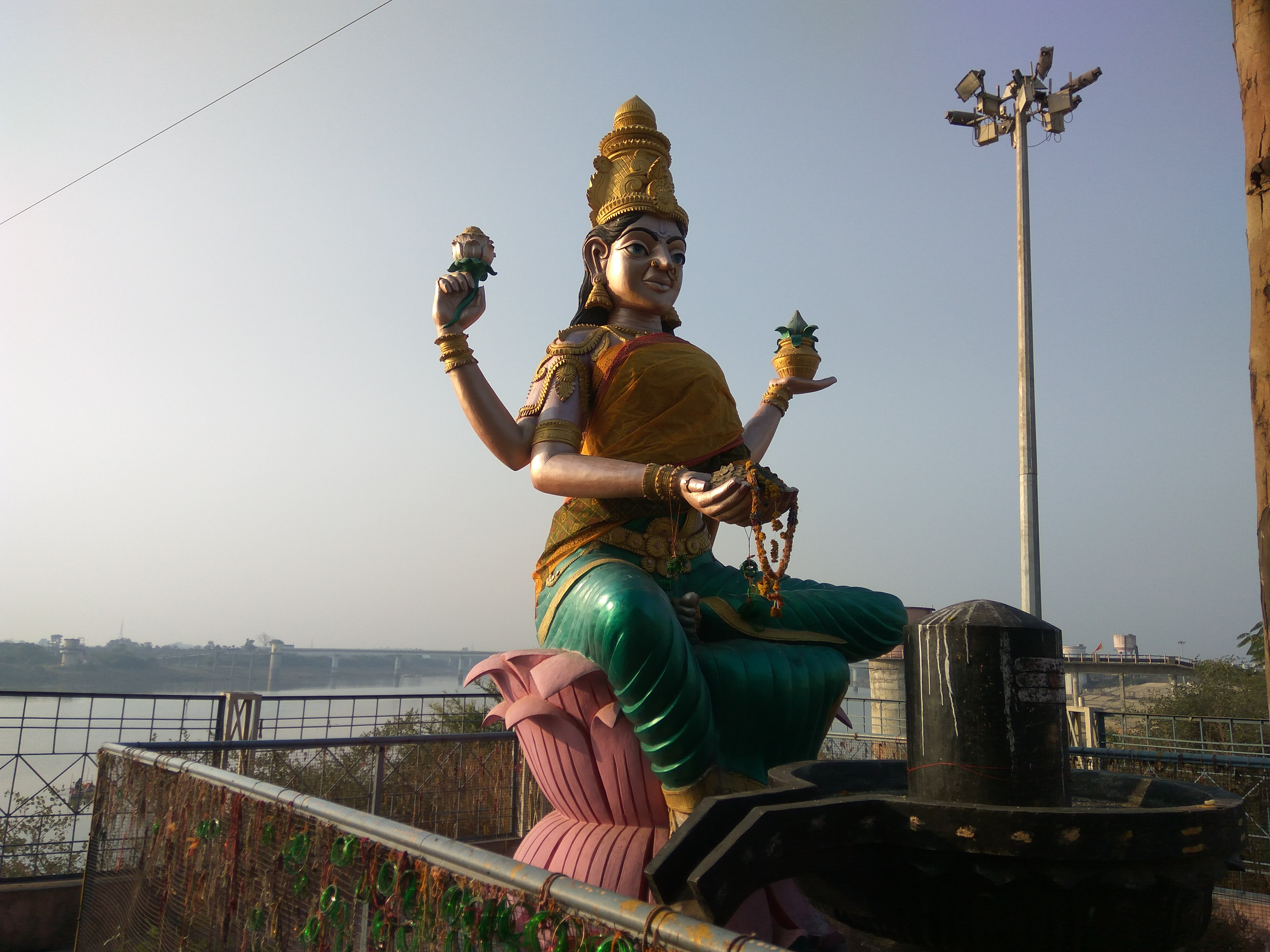
Goddess Saraswati beside Godavari river

Many pilgrims come to Gnana Saraswati Temple Basara to perform the "Akshara abhyasam" ceremony for the children before they start formal school education. The children perform the exercise of letters, and devote books, pens, pencils notebooks to the goddess of knowledge. The Puja at the temple starts at 4 am in morning with Abhishekam which carries on for an hour. At 5 o'clock they start the Alankarana whereby the new sarees are adorned to the goddesses. The whole atmosphere is very pious and pure. At 6 am, in the rays of the morning sun, the aarti starts at the temple after which the prasadam is given to the devotees.

Special poojas and celebrations are held at the temple during Maha Shivaratri, beginning 15 days before (Vasantha Panchami) and continuing 3 days after the festival. Devi Navarathrulu is celebrated for ten days during Dasara.

The temple also has a Mahakali idol situated on the 1st floor very near to the main temple. Devotees often go to the nearby mountain which has an Idol of Goddess Saraswati on the top of the rock. The image of Goddess Lakshmi stands beside Goddess Saraswati in the sanctum sanctorum. Due to the presence of Saraswati, Lakshmi and Kali, Basara is considered as the abode of the divine trinity.

== Transport ==
The temple is located about 210 kilometers (via road) from the nearest city Hyderabad. It is well connected by district buses, run by TSRTC. MSRTC buses also run from Hyderabad, Nanded, etc. The nearest railway station to the temple is Basar (BSX) Railway Station, located about 2.4 km away.

== See also ==
- List of Hindu temples in India
