= Bende people =

Ethnic group from Katavi Region of Tanzania

Total population
- 41,290 (2009)

Regions with significant populations
- Mpanda District of Katavi Region in western Tanzania

Languages
- Bende language

Related ethnic groups
- Tongwe

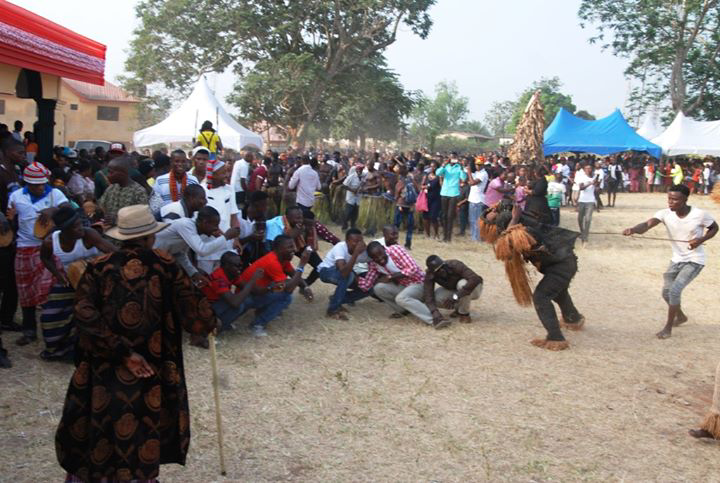
Bende cultural festival

The Bende are a Bantu ethnic group based in the Mpanda District of the Katavi Region in western Tanzania. In 2009, the Bende population was estimated to number 41,290.

== See also ==
- List of ethnic groups in Tanzania
