= Laxmanchanda mandal =

Coordinates: 19°05′54″N 78°18′07″E

Laxmanchanda is a Mandal in Nirmal district in the state of Telangana in India. It is one of the 5 mandals in Nirmal assembly segment. Laxmanchanda mandal is agriculturally well developed due to good irrigation facilities as its presence nearer to river Godavari and Sriramsagar dam. Establishing own intermediate and degree colleges by co-operative and village development societies has made the village to emerge in education field. Mandal headquarters is about 15 km from Nirmal town.

== Population ==
Laxmanchanda Mandal has a population about 36,000 and mandal headquarters has a population of around 6,000

== Cultivation ==
Majority of the farmers in this region cultivate Paddy & Maize.
