= Katavi Region =

Region of Tanzania

Katavi Region Mkoa wa Katavi (Swahili)
- Region
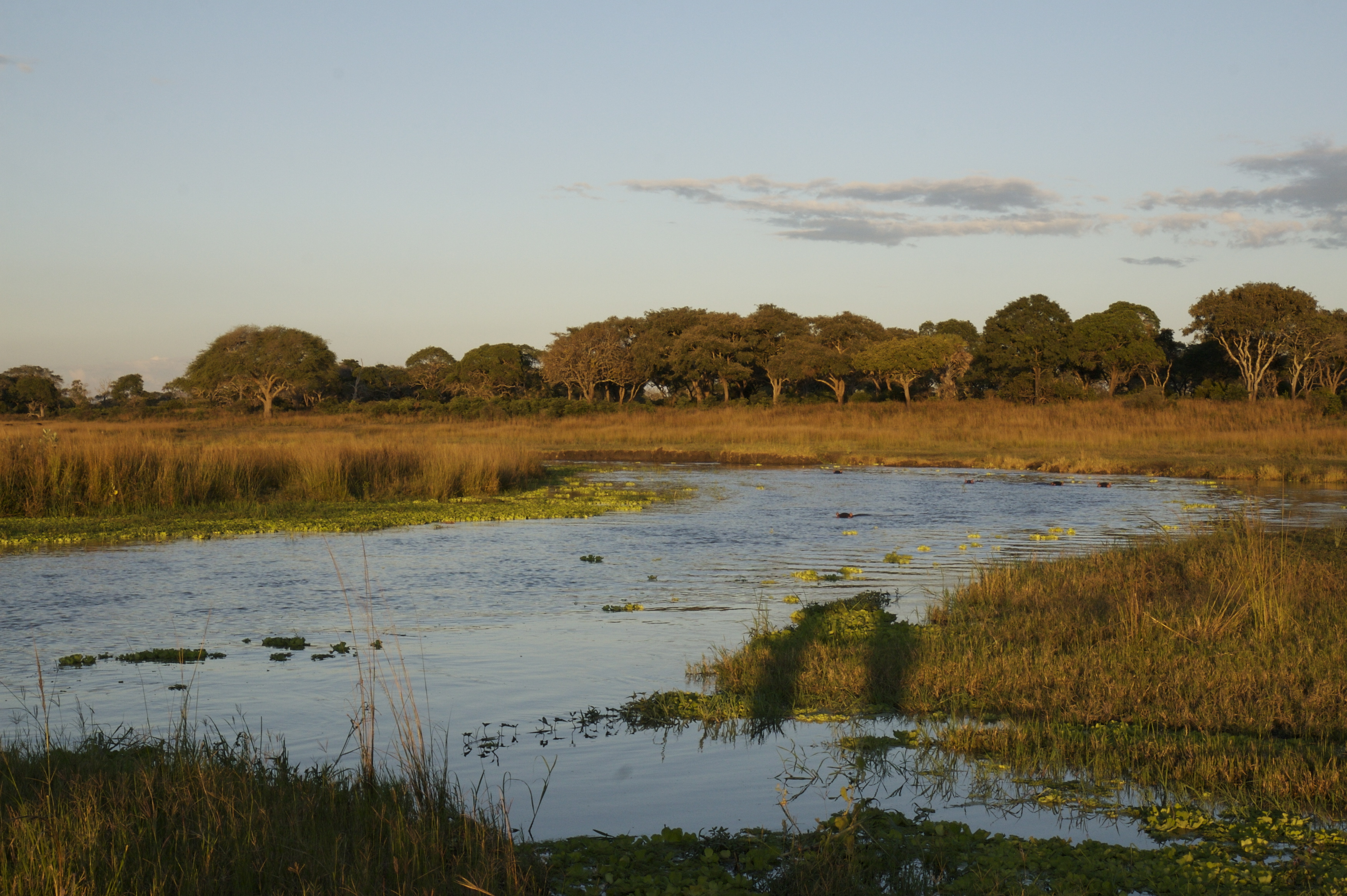
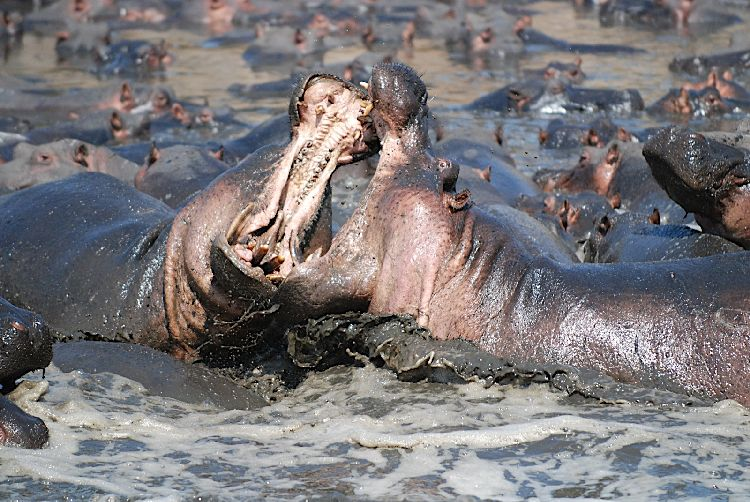
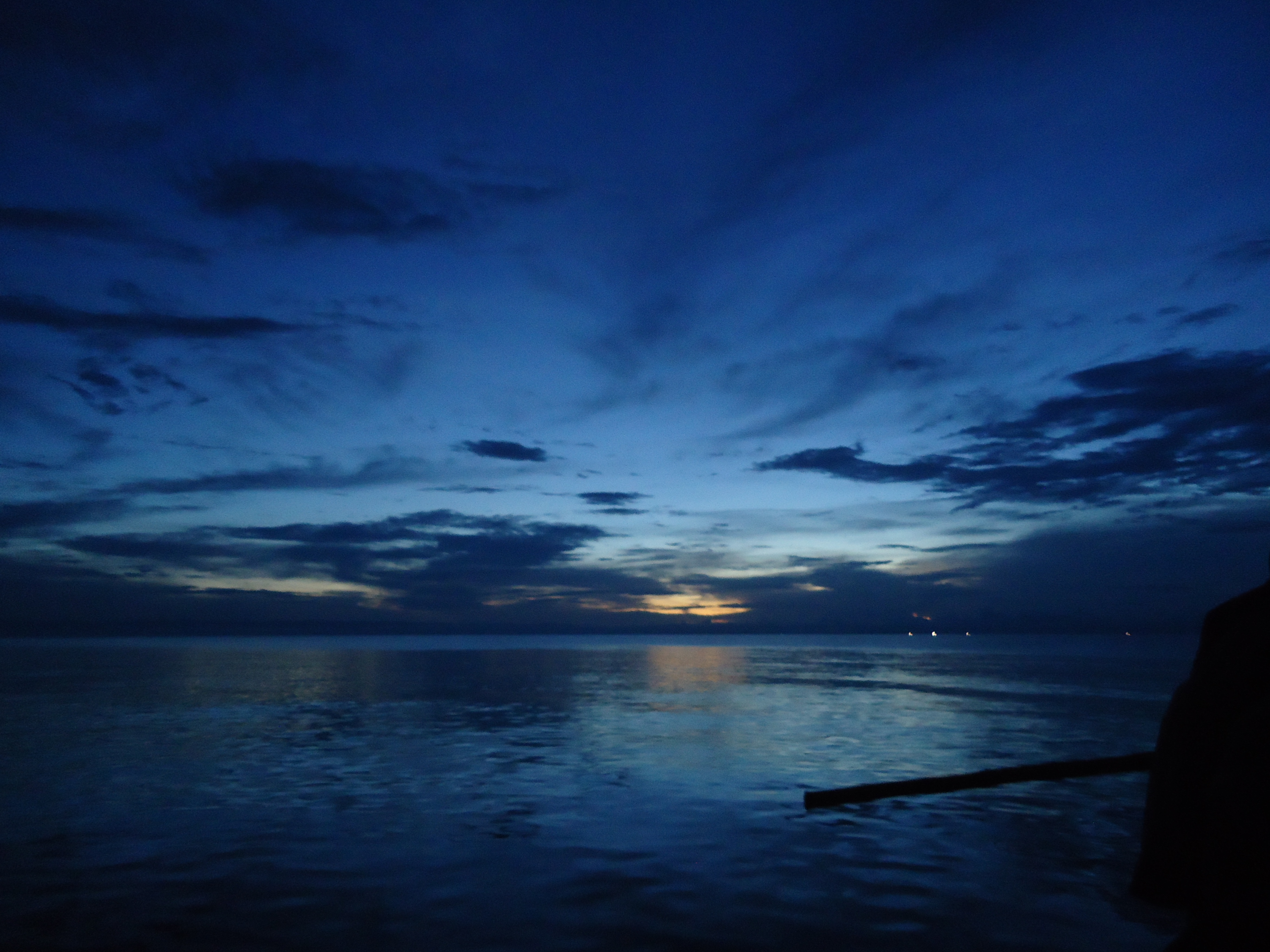
- From top to bottom: Katavi sunset, Katavian Hippos in Katavi National Park and sunset over Lake Tanganyika in west Katavi
- Nicknames: The Spirit of Lake Tanganyika; The Natural Region
- Location in Tanzania
- Coordinates: 6°22′3.72″S 31°15′45.36″E
- Country: Tanzania
- Zone: Western
- Region: 2012
- Capital: Mpanda
- Districts: List: Mlele District; Mpanda Town; Mpanda District; Mpimbwe District; Nsimbo District

Government
  - Regional Commissioner: Mwanamvua Mrindoko (CCM)

Area
  - Total: 45,843 km^{2} (17,700 sq mi)
  - Rank: 6th of 31
- Highest elevation (Kisusi): 2,130 m (6,990 ft)

Population (2022)
  - Total: 1,152,958
  - Rank: 25th of 31
  - Density: 25.150/km^{2} (65.139/sq mi)
- Demonym: Katavian

Ethnic groups
  - Settler: Swahili & Sukuma
  - Native: Bende, Holoholo, Konongo, Pimbwe, Tongwe, Vinza & Rungwa
- Time zone: UTC+3 (EAT)
- Postcode: 50xxx
- Area code: 025
- ISO 3166 code: TZ-28
- HDI (2021): 0.483 low · 24th of 25
- Website: Official website
- Symbols of Tanzania
- Bird: Tanzanian masked weaver
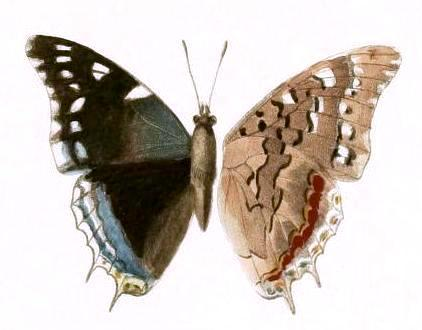
- Butterfly: Charaxes guderiana

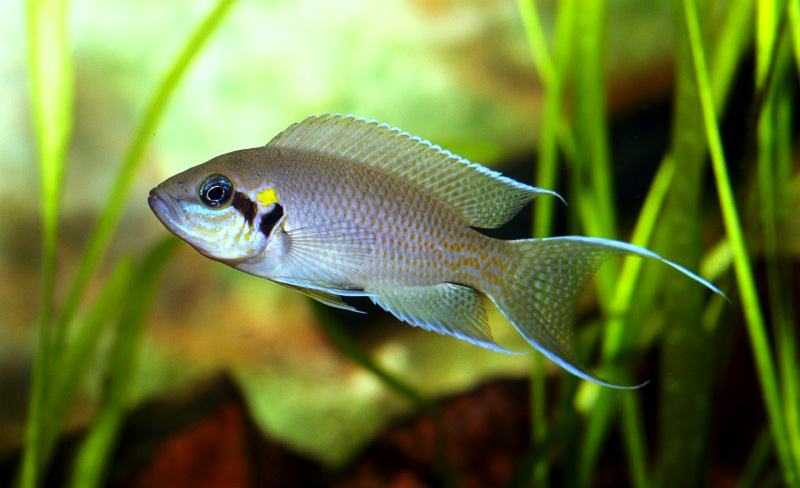
- Fish: Neolamprologus brichardi

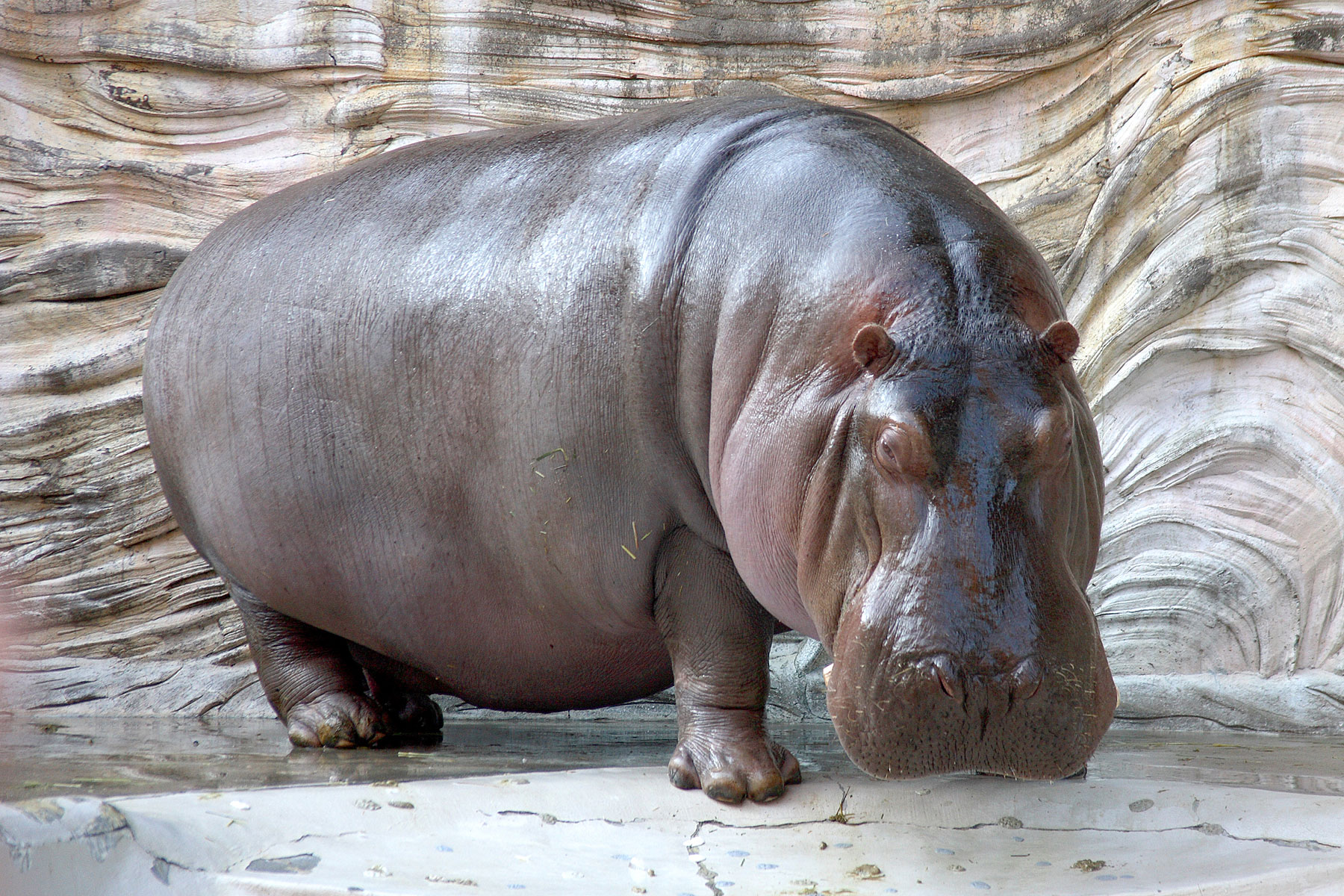
- Mammal: Hippopotamus

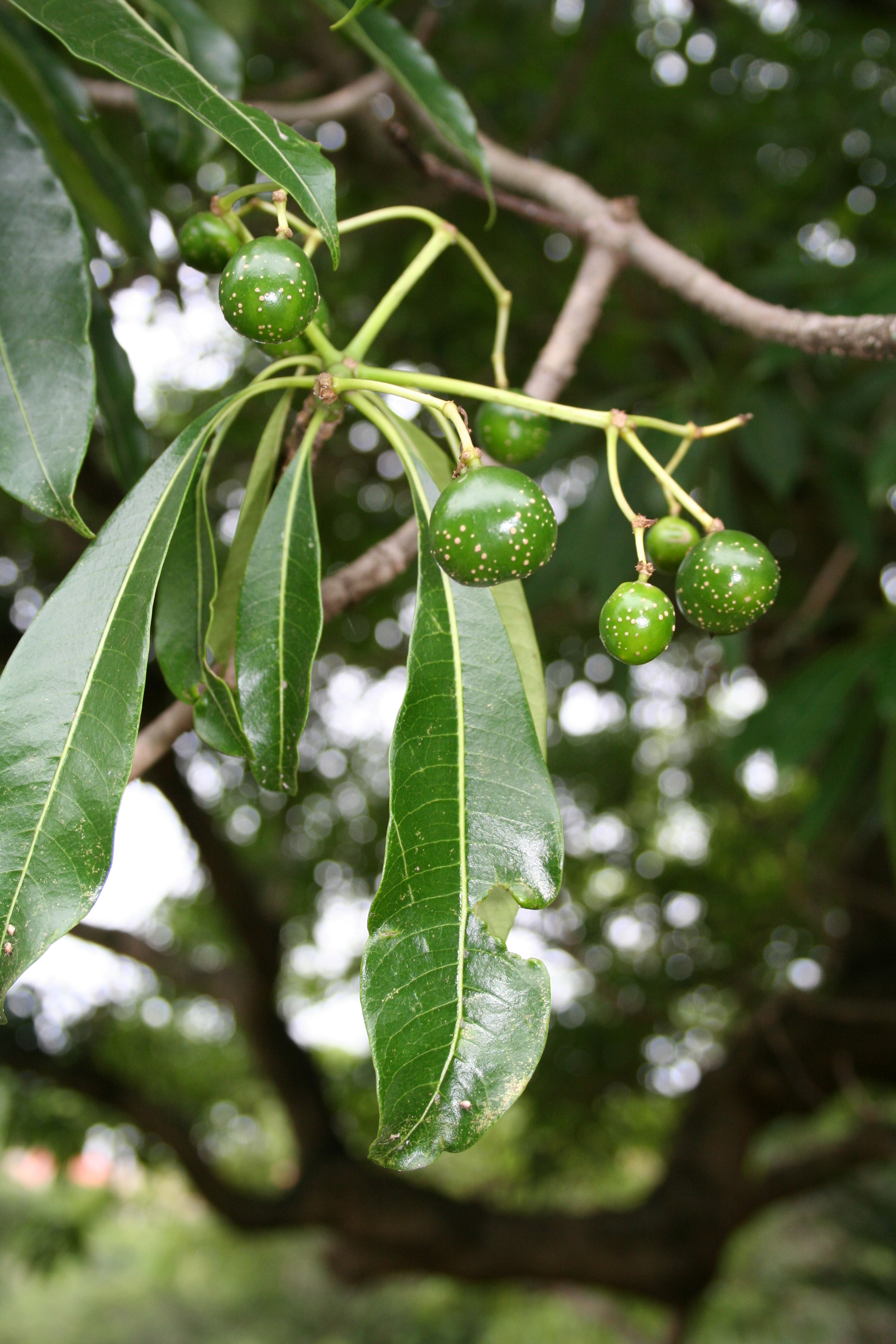
- Tree: Rauvolfia afra

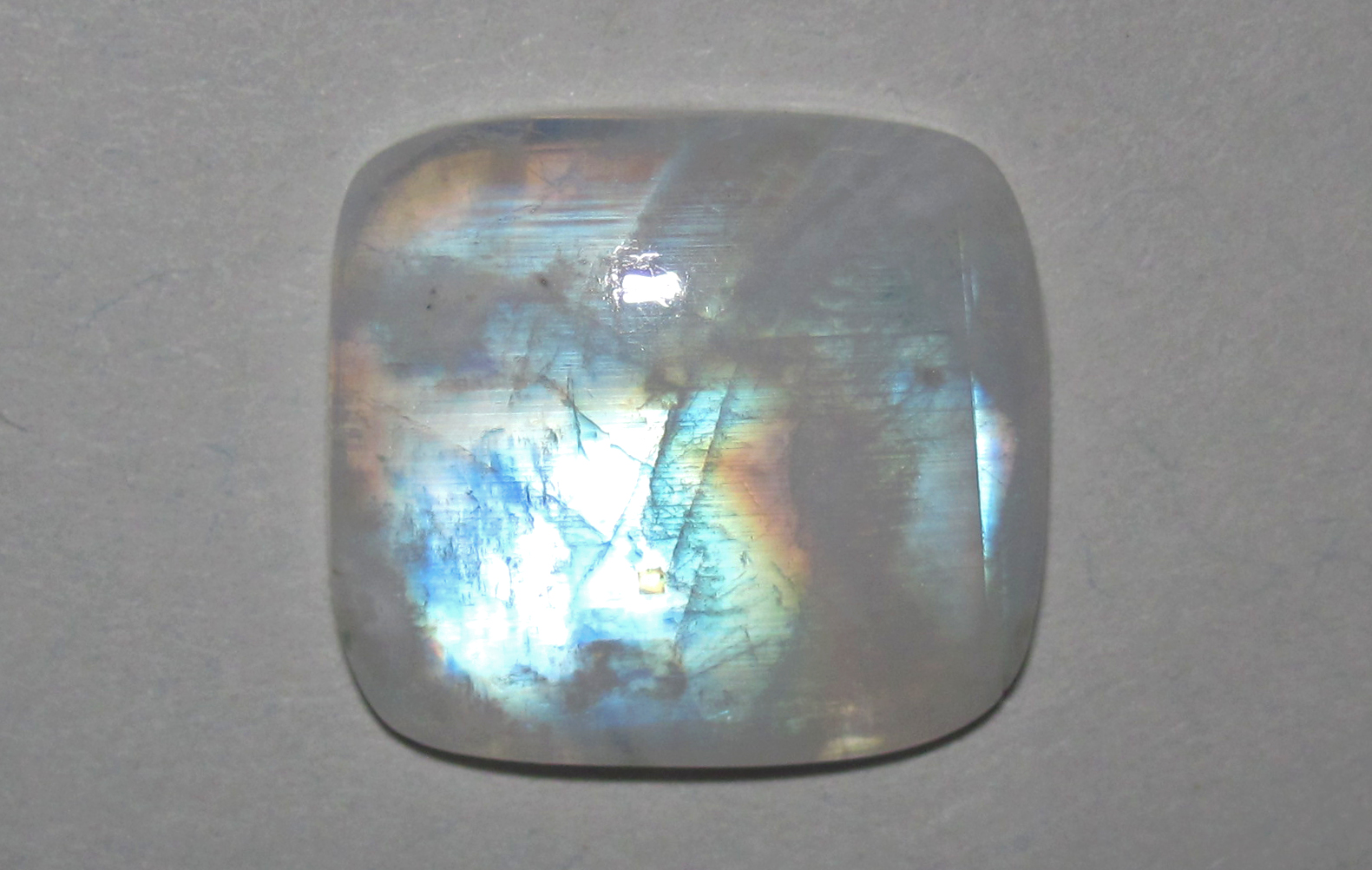
- Mineral: Moonstone

Katavi Region (Swahili: Mkoa wa Katavi) is one of Tanzania's 31 administrative regions. The region covers an area of 45,843 km^{2} (17,700 sq mi). The region is comparable in size to the combined land area of the nation state of Estonia. Katavi Region is bordered to the north and the west by Kigoma Region, to the east by Tabora Region, and to the south by Rukwa Region and Songwe Region. Lastly, Katavi borders DRC on Lake Tanganyika to the west. The region derives its name from Katavi, the spirit of lake Tanganyika. The regional capital city is Mpanda. According to the 2022 national census, the region had a population of 1,152,958.

== Geography ==
Katavi Region is located between Longitude 30° and 33° East of Greenwich and Latitudes 5° 15° to 7° 03° South of the Equator. It is bordered to the north by the Urambo District (Tabora), to the east by the Sikonge District (Tabora), to the east by the Chunya District (Mbeya), to the south by the Sumbawanga District (Rukwa), to the south-east by the Democratic Republic of the Congo (separated by Lake Tanganyika), and to the northwest by the Kigoma District (Kigoma).

At an altitude of 1,000 to 2,500 meters above sea level, the Katavi Region has typical yearly temperatures between 26 and 30 degrees Celsius. The range of the average annual rainfall is 920 to 1,200 mm. The district is made up of gentle plains, plateaus, tiny mountain peaks, moderate hills, and Mwese highlands. The soft plains of the Karema depression, the Katumba plains, and Lake Tanganyika, which has steep hills, mild plateaus, and plains, are other features that define the area. The region's miombo forests are covered in the most greenery.

=== Climate ===
The long and brief rainy seasons in Katavi's climate are typical of the West southern highlands as a whole. The annual range of precipitation is 700 to 1,300 millimeters, with significant regional, seasonal, and yearly changes. The rainy season typically lasts from November to April. The highlands zone, the midlands zone, and the lowlands zone are the three distinct agro-ecological zones in the area. Depending on altitude, temperatures can range from 13 degrees Celsius to 16 degrees Celsius in June and July and increase from September to November.

== Economy ==
Agriculture makes up the majority (96%) of the region's economic activity, while 0.7% of the labor force is employed in the care of livestock. In the Katavi Region, small-scale farmers with dispersed land holdings for different crops are the main agricultural producers. Maize, rice, sunflower, sesame, groundnuts, cassava, millet, sweet potatoes, and sorghum are some of the major crop products produced. 2018 saw no ginneries in the area because farmers had only recently begun cultivating cotton.

=== Agriculture ===
Residents of the area also cultivate crops, but they also maintain sizable herds of native cattle, backed by a sizable grazing area that also draws pastoralists from neighboring areas. Less than 0.5 percent of the workforce is employed in the fishing industry. Forestry, mining, and tourism are some of the other significant industries in the area. Honey is produced in the Katavi Region and transported to other regions of the country, primarily Dar es Salaam, for processing and modern packaging.

=== Industries ===
The following industrial facilities are located in Katavi Region, including one large-scale industry that employs 153 people and is engaged in gold mining and primary processing. Three medium-sized industries are involved in processing milk, employing 65 people; milling cereals, employing 51 people; and manufacturing cement blocks, employing 51 people. In addition, there are roughly 14 businesses that employ 1,070 people altogether. The majority of businesses (57%) are engaged in the milling of cereals. The next largest sector is the manufacturing of furniture (16%), clothes (12%), and minerals (11%). 2% goes to the processing of edible oils, while 1% each goes to the production of shoes and building blocks. The region is connected by rail from Mpanda to Kaliua in the Tabora region, a 210 km long railway line offers three times weekly passenger and cargo transport services to the northern section of the region. Mpanda Airport serves the Katavi Region for local travel, but it has good connections to international travel from Songwe, Kigoma, and Tabora Airport via Dar es Salaam Julius Nyerere International Airport (JNIA) or Kilimanjaro International Airport (KIA). The principal minerals in the Katavi Region are coal, mica, moonstone, iron ore, nickel, cobalt, lead, gold, copper, and gold ore. Moonstone is mined in Karema and Kapalamsenga in Tanganyika District.

=== Wildlife and Nature Reserves ===
The wildlife reserves in Katavi Region include Rukwa Game Reserve and Katavi National Park. Additionally, there are areas designated as forest reserves, such as the ones in Inyonga, North East Mpanda, Msaginya, Mulele Hills, Rungwa, Kabungu, Ugalla River, and Rungwa River (all owned by the central government), Nkamba and Tongwe West (under local authority ownership). With 4.7 million acres, the Mlele District Council claims to have the largest natural forest area. The estimated total area covered by forests, including conserved forests, is 3,140,639.00 ha, or 68.51% of the total land area, making the region the most natural region in the country.

== Administrative divisions ==
In March 2012, shortly after the Katavi Region was created, Dr. Rajab Mtumwa Rutengwe was appointed Katavi Regional Commissioner. He was formerly the Mpanda District Commissioner.

=== Districts ===
Katavi Region is divided into six districts, each administered by a council: The additional district is Tanganyika District whose census numbers will be published in 2023.

Districts of Katavi Region
District	Population (2016)
Mpanda Town	117,109
Mlele District	46,019
Mpanda District	203,872
Mpimbwe District	117,934
Nsimbo District	157,633
Total	642,567

== Notable persons from Katavi Region ==
- Mizengo Pinda, 9th Tanzanian Prime Minister
