= Kaddam, Nirmal district =

Kaddam
- Mandal
- Location in Telangana, India Kaddam (India)
- Coordinates: 19.097359°N 78.780173°E
- Country: India
- State: Telangana
- District: Adilabad
- Elevation: 293 m (961 ft)

Languages
  - Official: Telugu
- Time zone: UTC+5:30 (IST)
- PIN: 504202
- Vehicle registration: AP01

Kaddam is a village in Nirmal district in the state of Telangana in south India.

== Geography ==
Kaddam is located at 19.097359°N 78.780173°E. It has an average elevation of 293 meters (964 feet).

== Demographics ==
According to Indian census, 2001, the demographic details of Kaddam mandal is as follows

- Villages: 76
- Panchayats: 25
- Total Population: 52,703 in 13,036 Households.
- Male Population: 25,937 and Female Population: 26,766

== Villages ==
The villages in Kaddam mandal includes: Peddur, Chinna Camp, Khannapur or Kannapur, Kondukur, Patha Kondukur or Old Kondukur, Pedda Bellal, Uppari, Gudam, HariZana Wada, MorriGudam, Chinna Bellal, Peraka Palli, Chityal, Ella Gadapa or Yella Gadapa, Sarangapur or SarangaPoor, LingaPoor or Lingapur, Muthyampet, Peddur Tanda, Dharmaji pet, Pandvapur, Ambaripet, Godisiryala, Boothkur, Laxmipur, Navabpet, Kalleda, Gangapur, Dosthnagar, Allampalli, Munyal, Maddipadaga, Dasturabad, Bhuthkur, Singapur, Rajura, Devuniguddam, Rampoor, Perkapella, Godiseral, Revojipet, Buttapour, Mallapour, Islampour, Meddachintha, Gandigopalpour, Misampet.
