= Lokeswaram =

Coordinates: 19°01′49″N 78°05′39″E

Lokeswaram is a village in Nirmal district of the Indian state of Telangana.
