= Tanoor, Nirmal district =

Tanoor
- Mandal
- Location in Telangana, India Tanoor (India)
- Coordinates: 18.9537668°N 77.9801393°E
- Country: India
- State: Telangana
- District: Adilabad

Area
  - Total: 17.28 km^{2} (6.67 sq mi)

Population (2011)
  - Total: 4,124
  - Density: 238.7/km^{2} (618.1/sq mi)

Languages
  - Official: Telugu
- Time zone: UTC+5:30 (IST)

Tanoor is a mandal in the Nirmal district of the Indian state of Telangana. It is located in Tanoor mandal of Nirmal revenue division. It was a part of the Adilabad district prior to the re-organisation of districts in the state.

== Geography ==
Tanoor is located at 18.9537668°N 77.9801393°E.
