= Katavi National Park =

National park in Tanzania, Africa

- IUCN category II (national park)
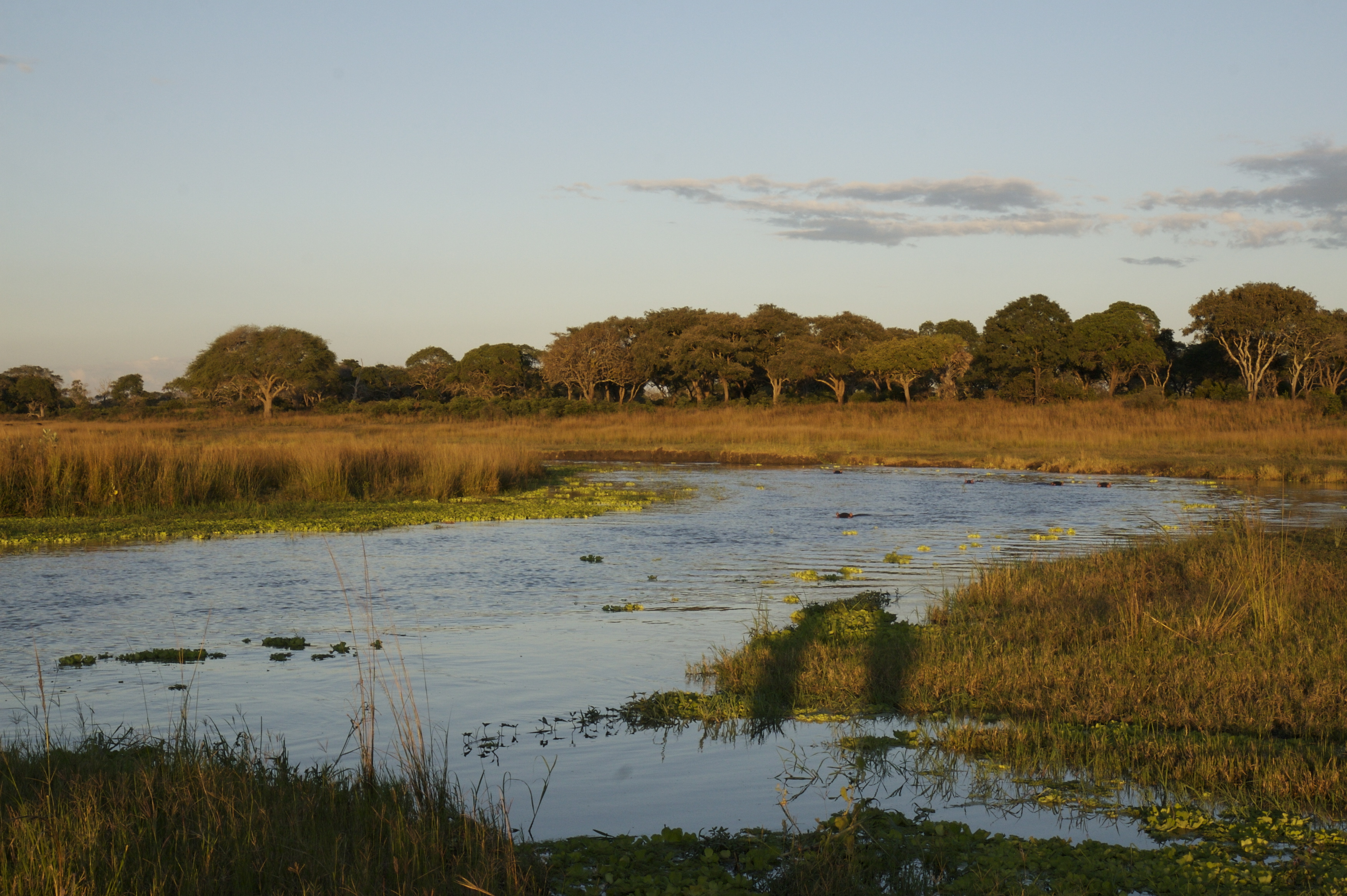
- Katavi National Park at sunset

- Location within Tanzania
- Location: Tanzania
- Nearest city: Mpanda
- Coordinates: 6°50′S 31°15′E
- Area: 4471 km^{2}
- Established: 1974
- Visitors: 3135 (in 2012)
- Governing body: Tanzania National Parks Authority
- Website: www.tanzaniaparks.go.tz

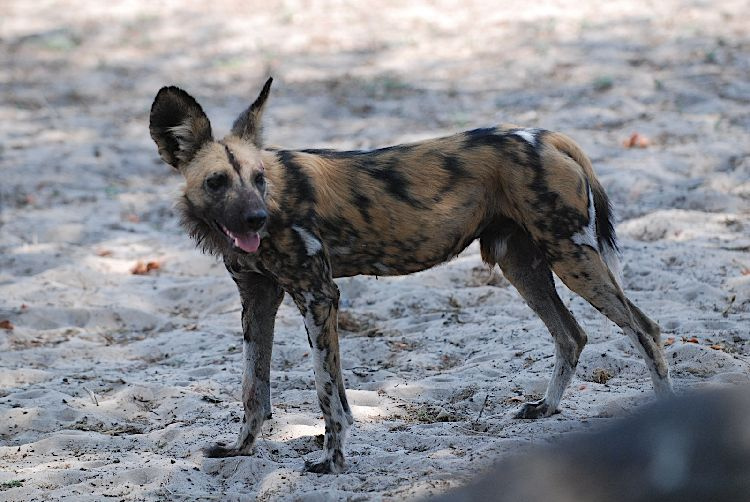

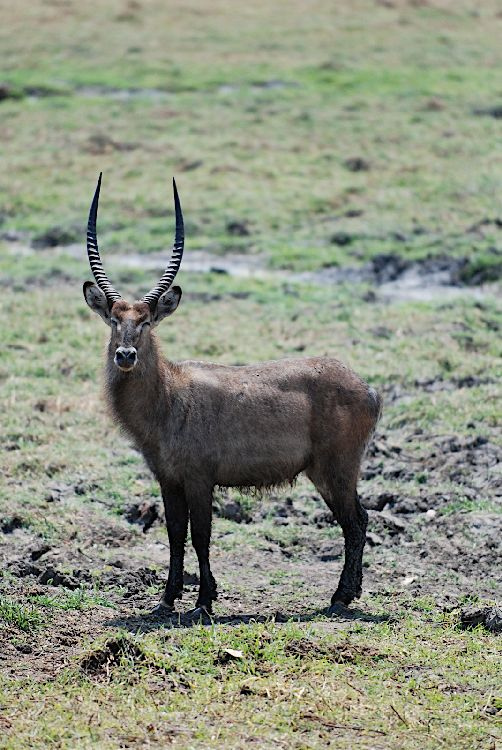

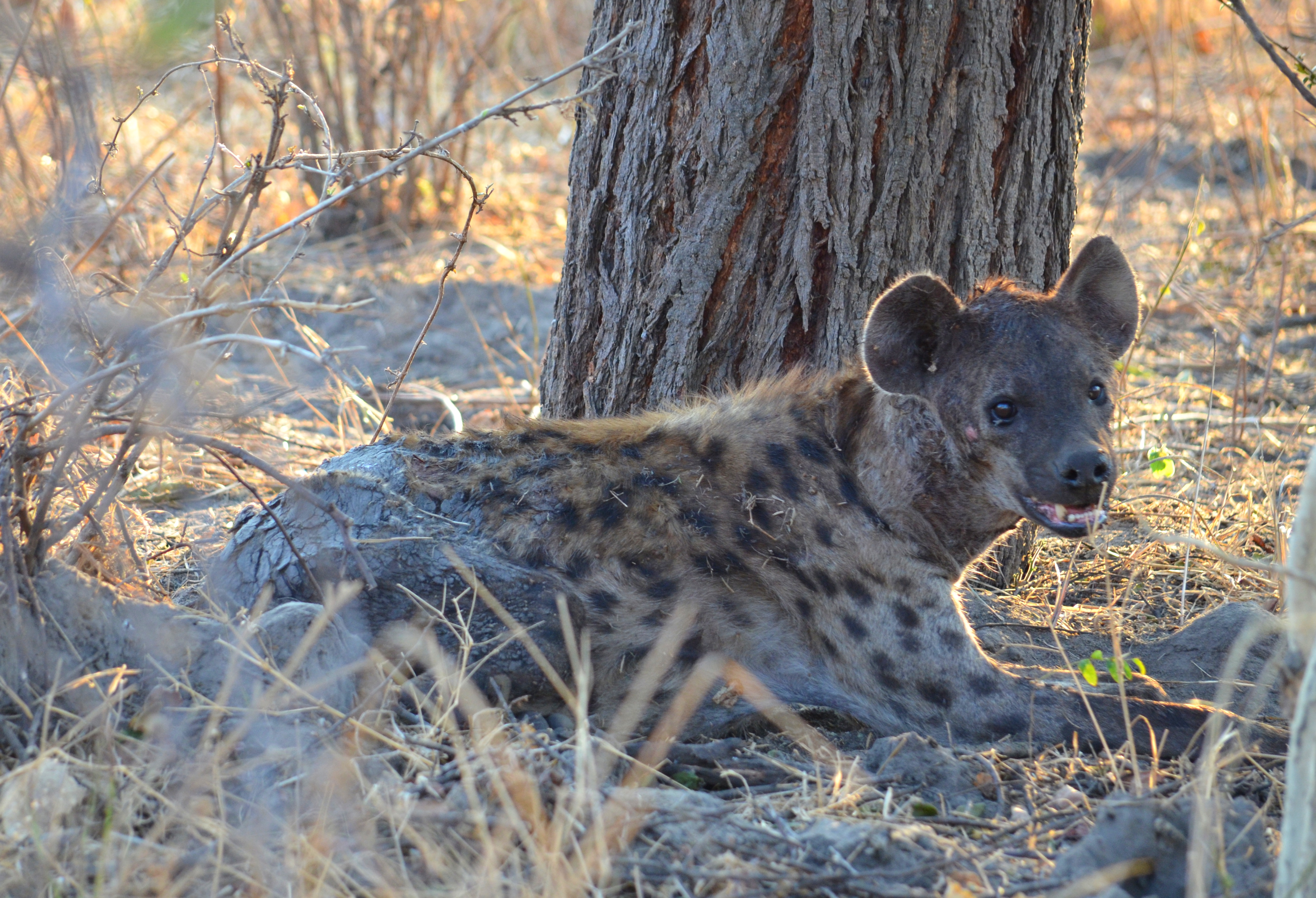

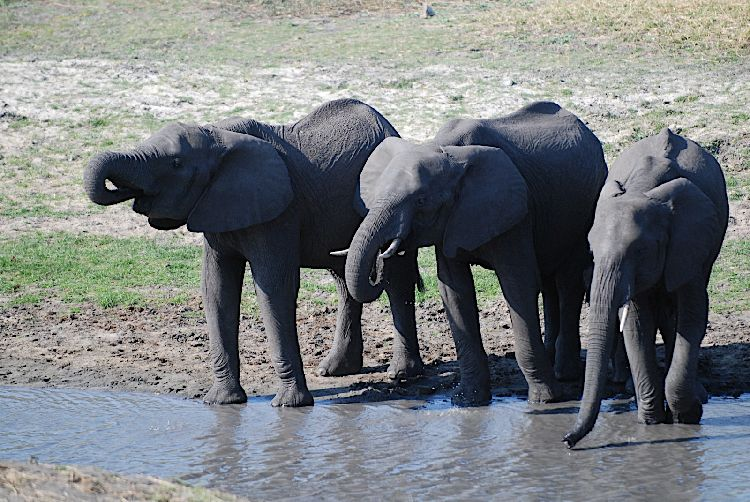

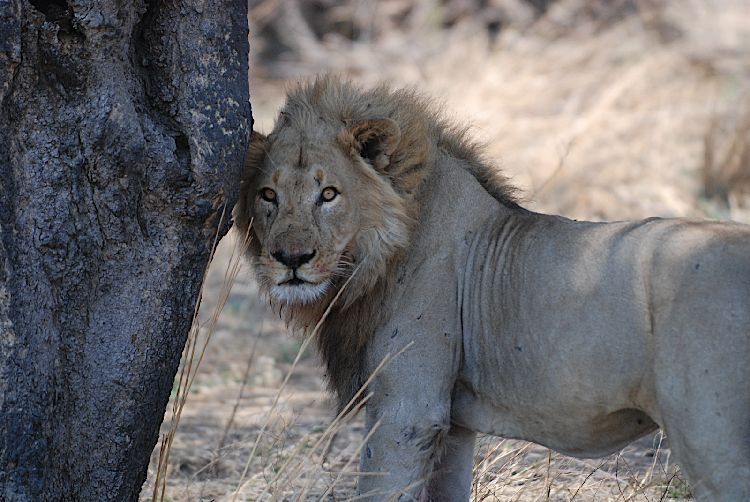
Wildlife of Katavi National Park

Katavi National Park is a Tanzanian national park created in 1974 and is located in Katavi Region, Tanzania. It is a very remote park that is less frequently visited than other Tanzanian national parks. The park is approximately 4,471 square kilometers (1,726 sq mi) in area, which makes it the third largest national park in Tanzania. The park encompasses the Katuma River and the seasonal Lake Katavi and Lake Chada floodplains.

== Wildlife ==
Wildlife features include large animal herds, particularly of Cape Buffaloes, zebras, giraffes, and elephants, plus along the Katuma river, crocodiles and hippopotami which upon annual dry seasons results in mudholes that can be packed with hundreds of hippos. Carnivorous animals that roam this park are cheetahs, wild dogs, hyenas, leopards, and lions. Some sources claim a very high biodiversity in the park, although there are also reports of wildlife decline due to illegal hunting and poaching, presumably 'bushmeat' sustenance. The area south-east of the Park near Lake Chada had the highest mammal numbers.

== Visitors ==
The number of visitors to the park on an annual basis is extremely low, in comparison to better known parks, just above 1,500 foreign visitors out of a total 900,000 registered in the whole Tanzania National Parks system during 2012/13. A survey of the actual rooms sold by the available 'Safari' style accommodations might reveal the number, but based on total room count and season length, an upper limit can also be estimated. In addition to a public campsite (located at SO 06'39'19.1 E0 031'08'07.9), as of 2013, there were only three permanent camps permitted to operate at Katavi, namely the Mbali Mbali Katavi Lodge and the Foxes on the Katuma Plain and the Chada on the Chada Plain. These camps each have a visitor capacity limit of approximately one dozen each.

== Access to the park ==
Getting to Katavi for visitors will likely be arranged by the hosting camp, with one of the available charter flight services being the Mbali Mbali Shared Charter (operated by Zantas Air Services) or Safari Air Link. All flights will require landing on a dirt airstrip; the Ikuu airstrip (near the Ikuu Rangerpost) has minimal services. It is very approximately a three-hour flight from Katavi to Dar es Salaam and two-hours flight to Mwanza via a small, bush-compatible light aircraft. A flight to Arusha is similarly ~3 hours distant and operates on limited service usually only twice a week on Mondays and Thursdays.

Access to Katavi via ground transportation: estimates vary widely; it is generally discussed not in hours but in days. The town of Mbeya is (550 km/340 miles) distant and is described as a "...tough but spectacular..." drive; Google Maps indicates that Mbeya is 838 km from Dar es Salaam, making the total distance approximately 1,400 km (870 mi) and requiring 20+ hours. The most direct route to Dar es Salaam as per Google Maps is approx. 1250 km (~800 miles) and requiring 16+ hours. Arusha is similarly distant: 1000+km /13.5 hours. The percentage of transit on unpaved surfaces is unknown, but parts of all of these routes will definitely be on dirt roads. Since all of the above times from Google Maps assume an average transit speed of 80 km (50 mph), all these indicated travel times should be considered to be optimistic.
