= Mlele District =

Coordinates: 6.590°S 31.765°E

- District
- Mlele District of Katavi Region
- Country: Tanzania
- Region: Katavi Region

Area
  - Total: 15,539 km^{2} (6,000 sq mi)

Population (2022 census)
  - Total: 118,818
  - Density: 7.6464/km^{2} (19.804/sq mi)

Mlele District is one of the five districts of the Katavi Region of Tanzania.

Mlele District was formed in 2012 out of part of Mpanda District. The population in 2022 was 118,818.

== Administrative subdivisions ==
Mlele District is administratively divided into twenty-three wards:

- Ikuba
- Ilela
- Inyonga
- Itenka
- Kapalala
- Kasansa
- Kasokola
- Kibaoni
- Litapunga
- Machimboni
- Magamba
- Majimoto
- Mamba
- Mbede
- Mtapenda
- Mwamapuli
- Nsekwa
- Nsimbo
- Sitalike
- Ugalla
- Urwira
- Usevya
- Utende
