= Narsapur G, Nirmal district =

Narsapur G Narsapur G
- Town
- Narsapur G
- Nickname: Village of Bangles
- Location in Telangana, India
- Coordinates: 19.10°N 78.16°E
- Country: India
- State: Telangana
- District: Nirmal

Government
  - Type: Sarpanch-Gram Panchayat
  - Body: Major Gram Panchayat, Narsapur G
- Elevation: 340 m (1,120 ft)

Population (2011)
  - Total: 5,787
  - Rank: -

Languages
- Time zone: UTC+5:30 (IST)
- PIN: 504104
- Telephone code: 08734
- Vehicle registration: TG-18
- Sex ratio: 50:50 ♂/♀

Narsapur (G) is a Town Mandal in the Nirmal District of Telangana. Historically known for its bangle-making industry, it is popularly referred to as "Gajula Narsapur." The town is situated approximately 20 kilometres from both Nirmal Municipality and Bhainsa Town. It is also renowned for the Mallikarjuna Swamy Temple located near Devuni Cheruvu.

During the period when Nirmal District formed part of the erstwhile Adilabad District, Narsapur (G) was recognized as one of the 27 major Gram Panchayats in the district. A major Gram Panchayat was generally classified as one having a population exceeding 5,000 residents, reflecting the prominence and administrative importance of Narsapur (G) in the region.

Narsapur (G) is also well known for its Zilla Parishad Secondary School (ZPSS), which has contributed significantly to the education of students from the surrounding areas. Notably, Justice B. Chandra Kumar, a retired High Court Judge, hails from this village.

The town serves as a major commercial and service centre for nearly 20–30 surrounding villages, catering to their day-to-day needs and essential services. It is equipped with various public institutions, including a 30-bed Government Hospital, making it an important healthcare hub for the neighbouring rural population. Owing to its educational, healthcare, commercial, and administrative significance, Narsapur (G) occupies a prominent position in the region.

== List of Villages in Narsapur G Mandal ==
Narsapur G Mandal has a total of 21 villages. The table below includes all villages in the Mandal, along with their Gram Panchayat and category details:

Sl. No.	Village Name	Category	Gram Panchayat
1	Anjani	Rural	Kusli
2	Arli (Khurd)	Rural	Chakpally
3	Bamini (Buzurg)	Rural	Bamini
4	Burgupalle (K)	Rural	Chakpally
5	Burugupalle (G)	Rural	Gollamada
6	Chackpalli	Rural	Chakpally
7	Cherlapalle	Rural	Rampur
8	Daryapur	Rural	Rampur
9	Dongargaon	Rural	Chakpally
10	Gollamada	Rural	Gollamada
11	Kusli	Rural	Kusli
12	Muthakapalli	Rural	Chakpally
13	Nandan	Rural	Nandan
14	Narsapur	Rural	Narsapur(G)
15	Naseerabad	Rural	Rampur
16	Rampur	Rural	Rampur
17	Shakapur	Rural	Rampur
18	Tekulpahad	Rural	Gollamada
19	Temborni	Rural	Temburni
20	Turati	Rural	Turati
21	Velgudhari	Rural	Gollamada

== Assembly Constituency ==
Narsapur comes under Nirmal constituency is assembly constituency in Telanga State. There were 165,322 registered voters in Nirmal constituency in 2009 elections. In the future, it may become a constituency.

List of Elected Members:

- 1957 - Koripelly Muthyam Reddy
- 1978 - P. Ganga Reddy
- 1962 - P. Narsa Reddy
- 1983 - Aindla Bheema Reddy
- 1985 - Samudrala Venugopal Chary
- 1996- Nalla Indrakaran Reddy
- 1999 & 2004 - Allola Indrakaran Reddy
- 2009 - Aleti Maheswar Reddy
- 2014 - Allola Indrakaran Reddy
- 2019 - Allola Indrakaran Reddy
- 2023 - Aleti Maheshwar Reddy

== Advocates from this Village ==
1. B. Shubhakaran
2. K. Ajay Kumar
3. S. Narender
4. Gandewar Srikanth
