= Rajiv Gandhi University of Knowledge Technologies, Basara =

University in Telangana, India

Rajiv Gandhi University of Knowledge Technologies, Basar
- Catering to the Educational Needs of Gifted Rural Youth of Telangana
- Type: State university
- Established: 2008; 18 years ago
- Vice-Chancellor: Prof. A. Govardhan
- Students: 7500+
- Location: Basara, Nirmal district, Telangana, 504107, India; 18.8819968°N 77.9208459°E
- Campus: 272 acres (110 ha); Rural
- Colors
- Website: www.rgukt.ac.in

RGUKT IIIT Basar Campus Aerial view

RGUKT IIIT Basar Campus View

RGUKT IIIT Basar Entrance

Rajiv Gandhi University of Knowledge Technologies, Basar, commonly known as RGUKT IIIT Basar, is a state university in Basara, Nirmal district, Telangana, India. The university offers Undergraduate and Post Graduate degrees in various technology programmes.

== Campus ==
The institute is located in Basara village in Nirmal district, Telangana. It was set up under RGUKT (Rajiv Gandhi University of Knowledge Technologies) Act of 2008 to encourage meritorious students from rural areas to take up courses in technology.

== Academics ==
The institute offers six-year Bachelor of Technology after 10th class examinations which includes two years pre-university course equivalent to intermediate degree followed by four year degree course in engineering course. It also offers postgraduate Master of Technology courses.

== Affiliation ==
The institute comes under autonomous Institutions specialized in teaching and research sector in Information Technology and engineering. The institution follows the norms of its own and does not follow regulations of UGC.

== Culture and activities ==
With education the institute also emphasizes on Extra Academic Activity (EAA) as mandatory part of education. It conducts various extra academic activities such as arts, vocal music, Kuchipudi dance, and Yoga. The initiative to include classical art forms of India in the curriculum was conceptualised. AntahPragnya, a national level techno-cultural fest was being conducted every year.

== Departments ==
- Chemical Engineering
- Civil Engineering
- Computer Science and Engineering
- Electrical Engineering
- Electronics and Communication Engineering
- Mechanical Engineering
- Metallurgical and Materials Engineering
- Information Technology
- Business Management
- Mathematics
- Physics
- Chemistry

== See also ==
- Indian Institutes of Information Technology
- International Institute of Information Technology, Hyderabad
