= Konongo people =

Ethnic group from Njombe Region of Tanzania

The Konongo are a Bantu ethno-linguistic group based in the Mpanda District of Katavi Region in western Tanzania. In 1987 the Konongo population was estimated to number 51,000 .

The Konongo of Tanzania, who inhabit western Tanzania, consist of 138,000 individuals. They are predominantly known for practicing traditional African religion and speaking the Konongo language.

They are classified by the International Mission Board as unreached by the gospel.
