= Kubeer mandal =

Coordinates: 19°13′23″N 77°56′37″E

Kubeer is a Mandal in Nirmal district in the state of Telangana in India.
