= Pimbwe language =

Language

Pimbwe
- Cipimbwe, Icipimbwe
- Native to: Tanzania
- Native speakers: (29,000 cited 1987)
- Language family: Niger–Congo?: Atlantic–Congo; Benue–Congo; Bantoid; Bantu; Rukwa; Mbozi; Mwika; North; Pimbwe

Language codes
- ISO 639-3: piw
- Glottolog: pimb1238
- Guthrie code: M.11
- ELP: Pimbwe

The Pimbwe are an ethnic and linguistic group based in the Rukwa Region of western Tanzania, in the neighbourhood of Mpimbwe to the northwest of Lake Rukwa
