= Basara, Telangana =

Basara
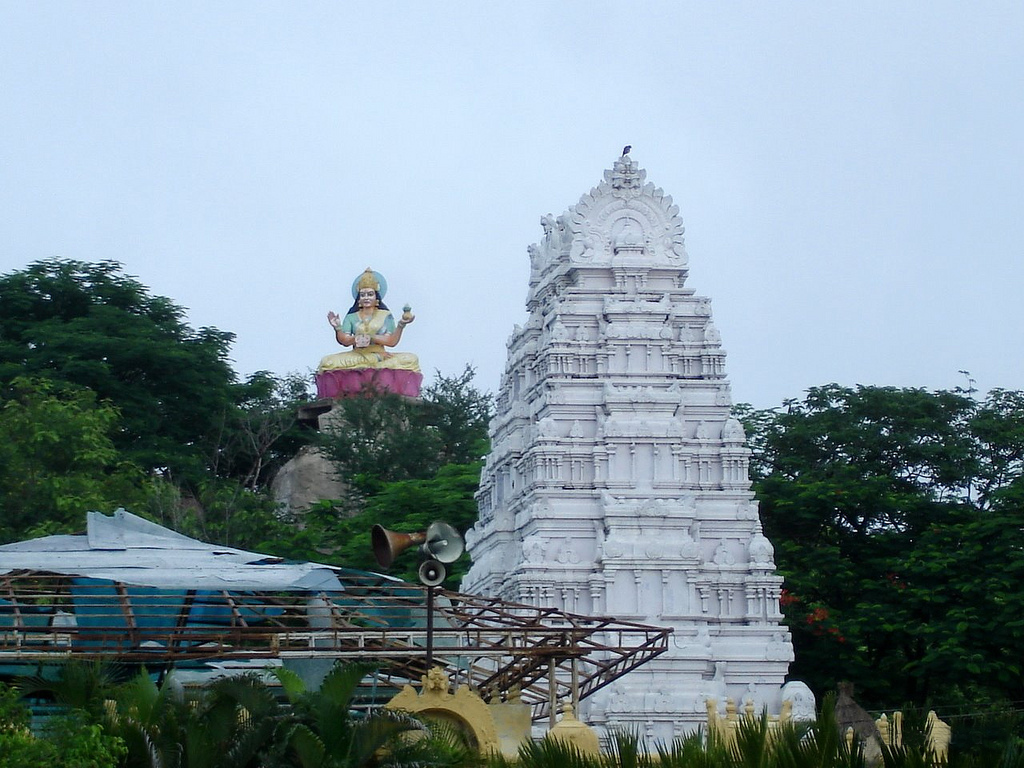
- Basara Temple view

- Location in Telangana, India Basara (India)
- Coordinates: 18°52′54″N 77°57′10″E
- Country: India
- State: Telangana
- District: Nirmal

Area
  - Total: 2.327 km^{2} (0.898 sq mi)
- Elevation: 579 m (1,900 ft)

Population (2015)
  - Total: 11,294
  - Density: 4,854/km^{2} (12,570/sq mi)

Languages
  - Official: Telugu
- Time zone: UTC+5:30 (IST)
- Vehicle registration: TG
- Website: telangana.gov.in

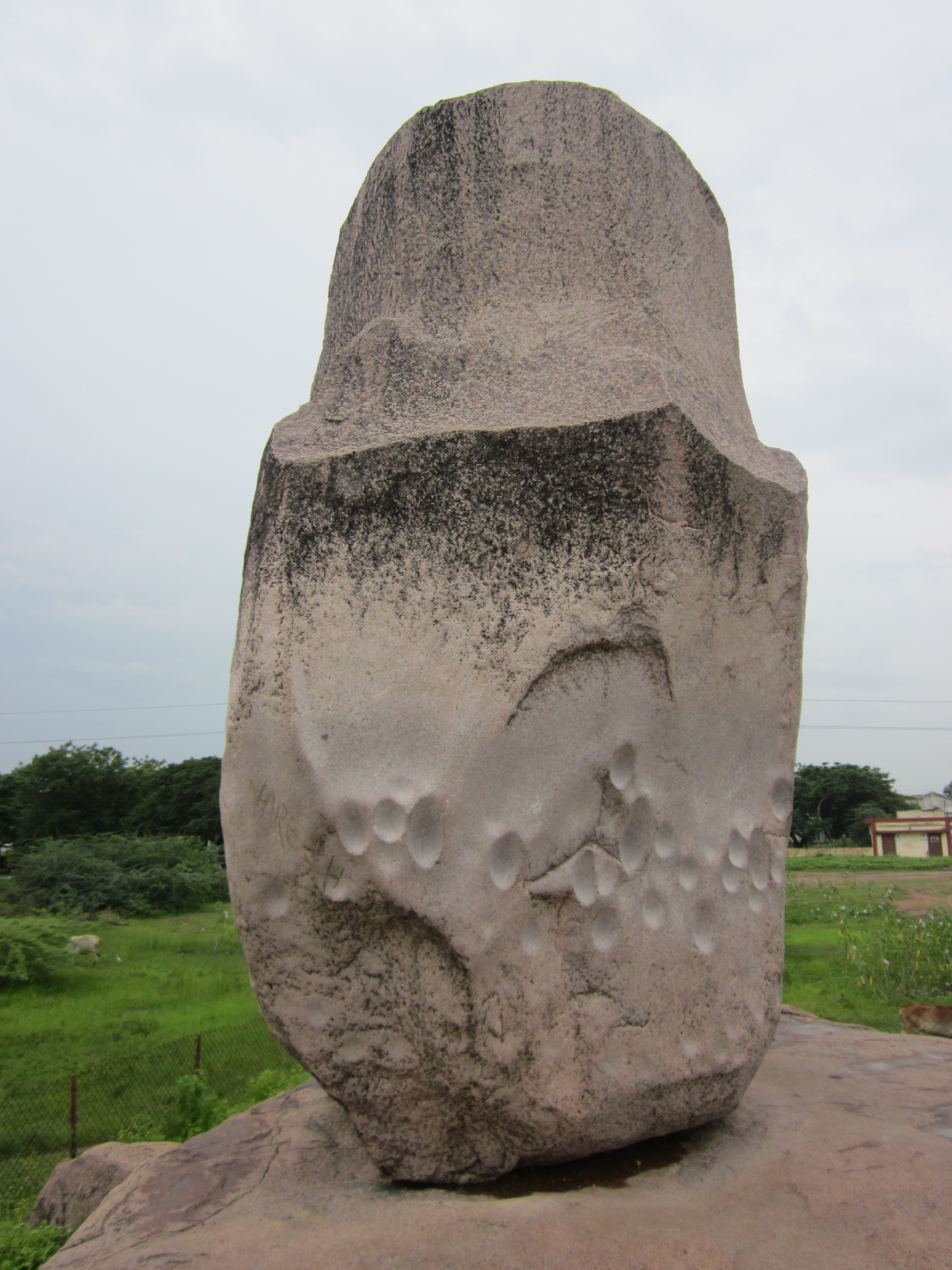
Veda sila at Basar

Basara is a census town in Nirmal district in the state of Telangana, India. It is located about 208 kilometres (129 mi) north of the state capital Hyderabad, 34 kilometres (21 mi) from Nizamabad and 73 kilometres (45 mi) from the district headquarters Nirmal.

== Geography ==
Basara has an average elevation of 579 metres (1899 feet).

It is located on the banks of River Godavari and is famous for its Saraswathi temple in India. This temple is one of the very few temples of Goddess Saraswati in India.

== Demographics ==
As of 2011 India census, Basara had a population of 5,865. Males constitute 56% of the population and females 44%. Basara has an average literacy rate of 72%, higher than the national average of 59.5%; with 61% of the males and 39% of females literate. 16% of the population is under 6 years of age.

== Rail transport ==
Basara (Railway Station Code: BSX) is a railway station under Hyderabad Division of South Central Railway(SCR). It is the last Telangana station on the Secunderabad-Manmad line. The next station Dharmabad, lies in Maharashtra. The town of Basar is connected to Nizamabad, Hyderabad, Nanded, Aurangabad and Mumbai.

== Saraswathi temple ==
The Gnana Saraswati Temple, Basara is a temple of Saraswati, the Hindu Goddess of Knowledge and Learning. Children are brought here to do the learning ceremony called Akshara Abyasam (means "initiation into education").

It is situated about 200 km from Hyderabad and 34.8 km from Nizamabad and 72 km from its district headquarters Nirmal. Basara is 600 km from Mumbai, by a train on the new Secunderabad – Mumbai Devagiri Express.

Godavari Harati daily Timings 06:00 to 19:30

== Education ==
The town is also home to IIIT Basara, a state university offering engineering courses, and Sri Veda Bharathi Peetham. Both were established in 2008.
