= Tongwe people =

Ethnic group from Kigoma Region of Tanzania

The Tongwe are a Bantu ethnic and linguistic group based in Kigoma District and Uvinza District of Kigoma Region, on the eastern shore of Lake Tanganyika in western Tanzania. In 2000 the Tongwe population was estimated to number 31,551.
