= Bhainsa =

- Town
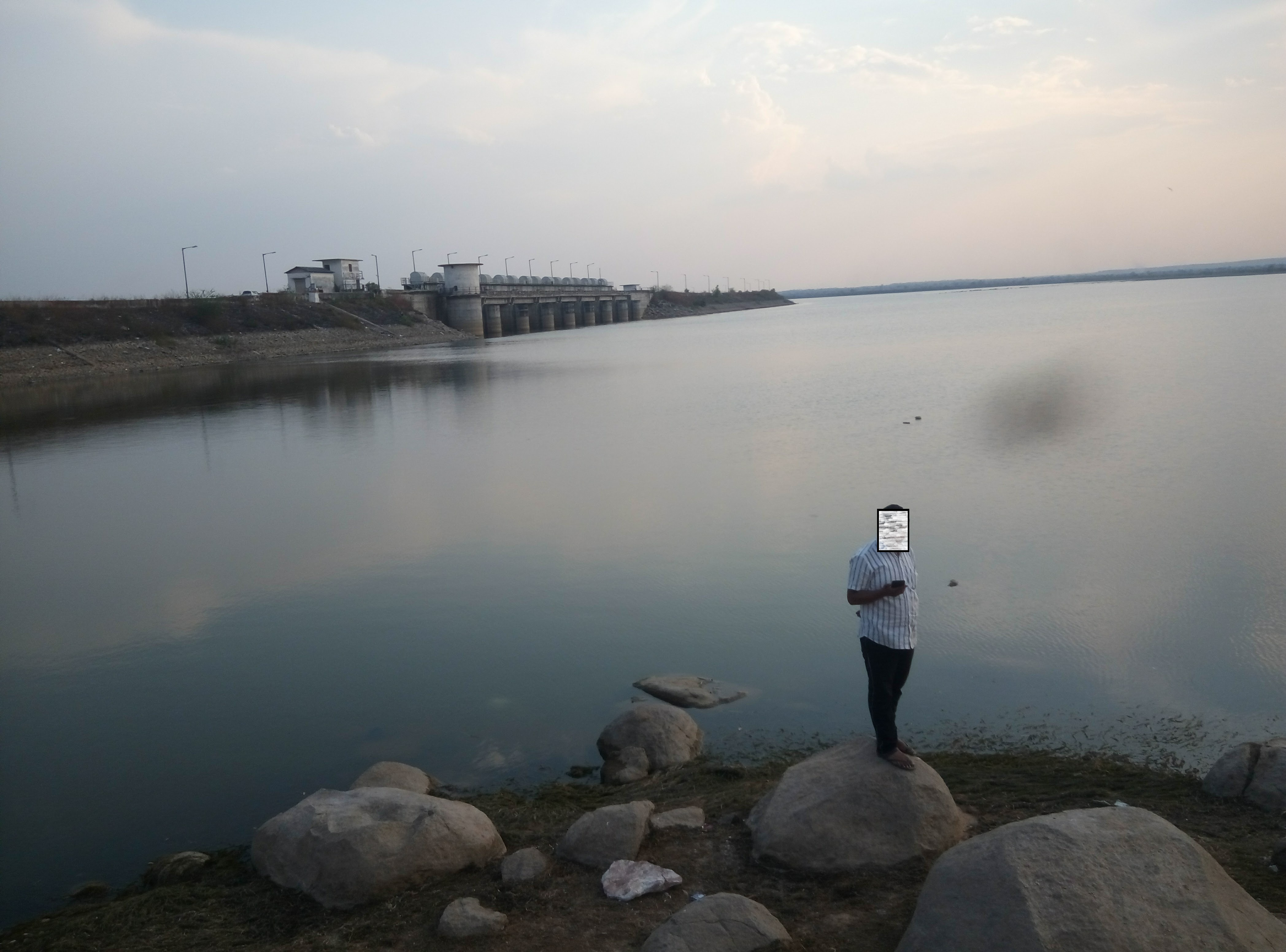

- Location in Telangana, India Bhainsa (India)
- Coordinates: 19.1000°N 77.9667°E
- Country: India
- State: Telangana
- District: Nirmal district

Government
  - Type: Municipality
  - Member of Parliament: Godem Nagesh
  - Member of the Legislative Assembly: Ram Roa Patel

Area
  - Total: 35.30 km^{2} (13.63 sq mi)
- Elevation: 363 m (1,191 ft)

Population (2026)
  - Total: 96,560

Languages
  - Official: Telugu, Urdu
- Time zone: UTC+5:30 (IST)
- PIN: 504103
- Vehicle registration: TS-18
- Lok Sabha constituency: Adilabad
- Vidhan Sabha constituency: Mudhole
- Website: bhainsamunicipality.in

Bhainsa is a town in Nirmal district of the Indian state of Telangana. It is the headquarters of Bhainsa mandal and Bhainsa revenue division. It is bordered with Bhokar taluk, Nanded district, Maharashtra State on west and Nizamabad district on South. Bhainsa is located at 19.1000°N 77.9667°E. It has an average elevation of 363 meters (1194 feet).

== Demographics ==
Religions in Bhainsa (2011)
Hinduism	49.06%
Islam	46.94%
Buddhism	3.02%
Other or not stated	0.98%

As of 2011 India census, the city of Bhainsa had a population of 49,764. Males constitute 52% of the population and females 48%. Bhainsa has an average literacy rate of 54%, lower than the national average of 59.5%; with 60% of the males and 40% of the females literate. 17% of the population is under 6 years of age. According to the 2011 census, the Hindus are 49.06% and Muslims are 46.94%. In the Mandal as a whole, the population is 89,417, of which the Hindus are 67.44% and Muslims are 29.27%.

Languages of Bhainsa (2011)
1. Urdu (46.0%)
2. Telugu (32.2%)
3. Marathi (17.3%)
4. Hindi (1.57%)
5. Others (2.89%)

Language wise, 46.04% of the population speaks Urdu, 32.22% Telugu, 17.28% Marathi and 1.57% Hindi as their first language.

== Government and politics ==
Civic administration

Bhainsa Municipality was constituted in 1934 and is classified as a first grade municipality with 32 election wards. The jurisdiction of the civic body is spread over an area of 35.30 km^{2} (13.63 mi^{2}).

Controversies

The town had witnessed multiple communal riots in the past few years. The town police authorities had come under criticism for not handling the communal clashes properly.

== Villages ==
#	Town	State	Population
1	Bhainsa Municipality	Telangana	49,764

#	Villages	Administrative Division	Population
1	Babalgaon	Bhainsa	364
2	Badgaon	Bhainsa	320
3	Bijjur	Bhainsa	828
4	Boregaon	Bhainsa	405
5	Chichond	Bhainsa	1,544
6	Chintalabori	Bhainsa	1,387
7	Dahegaon	Bhainsa	3,424
8	Ekgaon	Bhainsa	985
9	Elegaon	Bhainsa	1,992
10	Gundagaon	Bhainsa	694
11	Hampoli Khurd	Bhainsa	688
12	Hasgul	Bhainsa	805
13	Kamol	Bhainsa	2,696
14	Khatgaon	Bhainsa	1582
15	Kotalgaon	Bhainsa	1,678
16	Kumbhi	Bhainsa	739
17	Kumsari	Bhainsa	1,118
18	Linga	Bhainsa	402
19	Mahagaon	Bhainsa	3,061
20	Manjri	Bhainsa	925
21	Mategaon	Bhainsa	860
22	Mirzapur	Bhainsa	1,053
23	Pangri	Bhainsa	1,079
24	Pendapalle	Bhainsa	1,913
25	Siddur	Bhainsa	902
26	Sirala	Bhainsa	440
27	Sunkli	Bhainsa	1,520
28	Takli	Bhainsa	475
29	Thimmapur	Bhainsa	2,180
30	Walegaon	Bhainsa	1,924
31	Wanalpahad	Bhainsa	1,766
32	Watoli	Bhainsa	1,035

== Places of worship ==
- Lord Krishna Shrine temple dates back to the period of Kalyani Chalukyas. The region has witnessed the glory of various dynasties that have seen the imprint of the hallmark structures and other structures of heritage significance.

The temple located in Bhainsa village consists of garbhagriha, antarala and pillared mandapa that adorn the various directions of the Temple. The central four pillars show some of the best sculptural representations. Shaivite dwarapalas (carrying damaru, trisula, gada etc. in their hands) are carved here on antarala doorjambs and dwarapala sculptures at the entrance of the temple. Due to this evidence, it was once considered to be a Shaiva Temple, but there was no presence of Shivalinga in the garbhagriha. Presently it is known as Gopalji Temple/Gopalkrishna mandir since the temple now has a Krishna idol which is kept here in the garbhagriha and worshipped by the local people. A Vaishnava temple, with structures belonging to Shaivism is considered unique and hence this temple is popular with historians, for its impressive history as well as the sculptures that adorn the walls and pillars.

- Narasimha Mandir
- Mysamma Mandir
- Shiva Temple
- Sri Mahadev Mandir
- Saibaba Temple
- Borra Ganesh Mandir
- Jatashankar Mandir
- Shani Mandir
- Maha Lakshmi Mandir
- Gopal Krishna Mandir

== Agriculture ==
Major crops include cotton, paddy, maize, vegetables and sugarcane.

Gaddenavagu or Suddavagu is a medium irrigation project across Suddavagu which is a tributary of Godavari near Bhainsa in Nirmal district. The reservoir is situated at a distance of 2 km northwest of Bhainsa. The project grounded in the year constituency. The project commenced in 2000 and was completed during 2006.

The project provides irrigation potential to 20 villages in Lokeshwaram, Bhainsa, and Mudhole mandals for irrigating an ayacut of 14000 acres, as well as drinking water supply to Bhainsa town and 237 villages of Mudhole. Districts and mandals benefited Lokeshwaram, Bhainsa, and Mudhole mandals of Nirmal District IrrigationPotential (in acres):- Provides ayacut of 14000 acres in 20 villages of Nirmal district.
