= Mudhole =

- Village
- Location in Telangana, India Mudhole (India)
- Coordinates: 18.9667°N 77.9167°E
- Country: India
- State: Telangana
- District: Nirmal

Government
  - MLA: Sri Ram Rao Pawar
- Elevation: 346 m (1,135 ft)

Languages
  - Official: Telugu
- Time zone: UTC+5:30 (IST)
- Postal code: 504102
- Vehicle registration: TS
- Website: telangana.gov.in

Mudhole is a town in Nirmal district in the state of Telangana in India. It is very near to the Basar Saraswati Temple.

== Geography ==
Mudhole is a town and constituency of Nirmal District.

Mudhole is located at 18.9667°N 77.9167°E. It has an average elevation of 346 meters (1138 feet). It is positioned near the Godavari River.

Based on the 2011 census, the population of the town is about 12,777, across 2,825 households.

Mudhole is the headquarters of Mandal and Assembly Constituency. Ss of the 2023 elections, the sitting MLA is Pawar Ramarao Patel of the BJP.
