= Nirmal district =

- District of Telangana
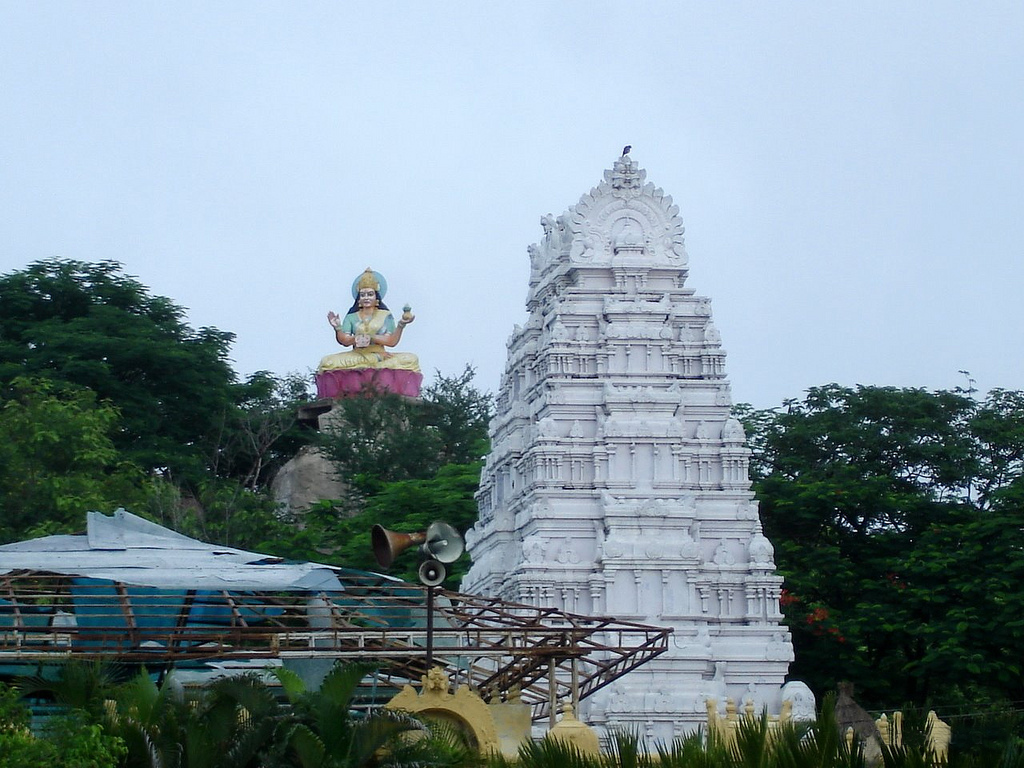
- Gnana Saraswati Temple in Basar

- Location in Telangana
- Nirmal district
- Country: India
- State: Telangana
- Headquarters: Nirmal
- Mandalas: 19

Government
  - District collector: Abhlasha Abhinav, IAS
  - Parliament Constituencies: Adilabad
  - Assembly constituencies: Nirmal, Khanapur, Mudhole
  - MP: Godam Nagesh (BJP)

Area
  - Total: 3,845 km^{2} (1,485 sq mi)

Population (2011)
  - Total: 709,418
  - Density: 184.5/km^{2} (477.9/sq mi)

Demographics
  - Literacy: 57.77 %
- Time zone: UTC+05:30 (IST)
- Vehicle registration: TG–18
- Major highways: 434 km
- Website: nirmal.telangana.gov.in

Nirmal district is a district located in the northern region of the Indian state of Telangana. The district headquarters is located in the town of Nirmal. It borders the Telangana districts of Adilabad, Nizamabad, Mancherial, Asifabad, Jagtial districts as well as Nanded district of the state Maharashtra.

== Geography ==
The district is situated on the Deccan Plateau comprising fertile lands drained by the Godavari River, that flows along its southern boundary. The district is spread over an area of 3,845 square kilometres (1,485 sq mi). The district is landlocked; It shares boundaries with Adilabad to the north, Komaram Bheem to the northeast, Mancherial to the east, Jagityal and Nizamabad (along with the Godavari) to the south and Nanded District of Maharashtra to the west.

== Demographics ==
Religion in Nirmal district (2011)
| Hinduism | 84.21% |
| Islam | 14.04% |
| Buddhism | 0.82% |
| Other or not stated | 0.93% |

As of 2011 Census of India, the district had a population of 709,418. The district has the highest female to male ratio in Telangana, with 1046 females to 1000 males. Nirmal district has a literacy rate of 57.77%. 66,206 (9.33%) were under 6 years of age. There are 376,760 labourers and 126,363 farmers. Scheduled Castes and Scheduled Tribes make up 108,085 (15.24%) and 80,576 (11.36%) of the population respectively.

Languages of Nirmal district (2011)
1. Telugu (65.5%)
2. Urdu (13.5%)
3. Marathi (10.9%)
4. Lambadi (6.43%)
5. Gondi (1.52%)
6. Others (2.11%)

At the time of the 2011 census, 65.52% of the population spoke Telugu, 13.54% Urdu, 10.88% Marathi, 6.43% Lambadi and 1.52% Gondi as their first language.

== Administration ==
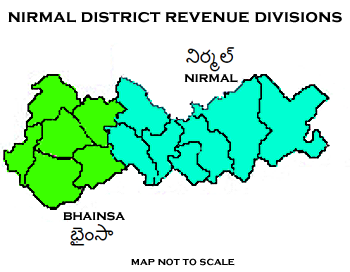
Nirmal District Revenue divisions

The district has two revenue divisions of Nirmal and Bhainsa, which are in-turn sub-divided into 19 mandals. The district has 3 municipalities and 400 gram panchayats.

The District Collector is Smt Abhilasha Abhinav, IAS. The Additional Collector (Local Bodies) is Shri Faizan Ahmed, IAS and the Additional Collector (Revenue) is Shri L. Kishore Kumar. Sub- Collector Bhainsa & SDM Bhainsa is Shri Ajmera Sanketh Kumar, IAS and Revenue Divisional Officer, Nirmal & SDM Nirmal is Smt Ratnakalyani.

The district has two police subdivisions, Nirmal and Bhainsa. Superintendent of Police (SP) is Dr. G. Janaki Sharmila, IPS. The ASP Bhainsa subdivision is Shri Rajesh Meena, IPS and the ASP Nirmal subdivision is Shri P. Saikiran, IPS.

| No. | Nirmal revenue division | Bhainsa revenue division |
|---|---|---|
| 1 | Nirmal Rural | Kubeer |
| 2 | Soan | Kuntala |
| 3 | Dilwarpur | Bhainsa |
| 4 | Narsapur G | Mudhole |
| 5 | Kaddam | Basar |
| 6 | Dasturabad | Lokeswaram |
| 7 | Khanapur | Tanoor |
| 8 | Mamda | Malegaon |
| 9 | Pembi | Beltaroda |
| 10 | Laxmanchanda | |
| 11 | Sarangapur | |
| 12 | Ponkal | |
| 13 | Beeravalli | |

== Tourism and culture ==
Sri Ram Sagar Project is located at the border of the Nirmal and Nizamabad districts. It is the center of attraction for tourists.

Kadem Project, Saraswati Temple Basar, Kawal Tiger Reserve Kadem, Sadarmat are all major tourist destinations in Nirmal.

== See also ==
- List of districts in Telangana
