= Mpanda =

Capital of Katavi Region, Tanzania

- City of Katavi Region
- Location in Tanzania
- Coordinates: 6°21′S 31°04′E
- Country: Tanzania
- Region: Katavi
- District: Mpanda

Area
  - Total: 318.4 km^{2} (122.9 sq mi)

Population (2022 census)
  - Total: 204,338
  - Density: 641.8/km^{2} (1,662/sq mi)
- Time zone: UTC+3 (GMT)
- Postcode: 501
- UFI: -2569886
- Website: www.katavi.go.tz

Mpanda is a city in Katavi Region of Tanzania, East Africa with a postcode number 50100. It is the administrative centre of Katavi Region, Mpanda District and is itself one of the four districts of the region.

Mpanda is a "frontier town" in the far west of Tanzania, roughly 500 km north of Mbeya and 380 km south-west of Tabora. It is the administrative headquarters for the Katavi Region, (created by subdivision of the Rukwa Region in 2012), and for the Mpanda District. It is an important centre in the rural economy, especially for the marketing and transshipment of rice and maize. The Katavi region is increasingly of interest to mineral prospectors, especially for gold. It is also a staging point for visiting the beautiful Katavi National Park, with its headquarters just 35 km to the south at Sitalike. The Park has a good cross-section of East African wildlife but is perhaps best known for its populations of hippopotamus.

As yet all roads into Mpanda (from Sumbawanga, Tabora or Kigoma) remain unsealed and may for brief periods become impassable at the height of the wet season (particularly February–March). The Tanzanian government has in progress a project to seal a large part of the road north from Sumbawanga. Sumry operate two daily bus services to Sumbawanga (240 km 5 hours), one of those going on to Mbeya. Several bus lines operate to Tabora (380 km, 9 hours). Local services include minibuses to Sitalike, and daily bus services to Usevya and to the fishing villages of Karema and Ikola on Lake Tanganyika. Mpanda is the endpoint of a rail line with passenger services from Tabora (approx 12-15 hours). In 2012 the government completed an upgrade of Mpanda airport to a 2 km sealed runway and a commercial air service has commenced.

Mpanda was made the centre of a new Catholic Diocese in October 2000 and has a cathedral with pictorial windows. The town is also the centre for the Anglican Diocese of Lake Rukwa created in June 2010. There is a Moravian church and other Christian services are provided by Lutheran, African Inland Church and Tanzania Assemblies of God. Muslim people are served by several mosques spread through the urban area.

== Transport ==
=== Airport ===
The city can be reached by flights operated by Air Tanzania

== See also ==
- Railway stations in Tanzania
