= Mpanda District =

District of Katavi Region, Tanzania

Coordinates: 06°20′41″S 031°04′10″E

- District
- Mpanda District of Katavi Region
- Country: Tanzania
- Region: Katavi Region

Area
  - Total: 16,940 km^{2} (6,540 sq mi)

Population (2022 census)
  - Total: 371,836
  - Density: 21.95/km^{2} (56.85/sq mi)

Mpanda District is one of the five districts of the Katavi Region of Tanzania. Its administrative seat is the city of Mpanda. The district is bordered to the northwest by the Kigoma Region, to the northeast by the Tabora Region, to the east by the Mbeya Region, to the southeast by the Sumbawanga Urban District, to the southwest by the Nkasi District and to the west (for a small portion) by Lake Tanganyika.

According to the 2002 Tanzania National Census, the population of the Mpanda District was 371,836.

== History ==
Historically Mpanda District was part of Tabora, but in 1975 it was transferred into the newly created Rukwa Region. In 2012 Mpanda District was transferred into the Katavi Region.

Mpanda owes its origins to the discovery of gold in 1934 by a very determined Belgian geologist and mining engineer called Jean de La Vallee Poussin. He obtained the concession and after then discovering a commercially viable deposit of lead and zinc, managed to develop the underground mine despite the difficulties of doing so in World War II. He was encouraged in this venture by the government of the time, seeing this as a source of raw materials for the war effort. The company, Uruwira Minerals Limited, was floated on the London Stock Exchange in 1947 as a source of financing for its contribution to the railway and the pipeline for water to the mine and township of that time. The need to transport the mineral concentrates to Dar es Salaam justified the construction of the railway to link up with the Ujiji to Tabora railway.

== Economy ==
While Mpanda District has mineral resources, gold, silver, other metallic sulfides, and even some rare earths, there is only one large mine, a gold mine owned by Kapufi Gold Mining Ltd. at Singililwa. The mine was prospected in 1996 and a gold extraction permit issued in 1999. Annual production was about 50 kilograms of gold, and although the mine ceased operation in 2002, it is expected to reopen. The former Mkwamba Mine, which produced a considerable amount of gold, closed completely in the 1960s. There are some small mining operations recovering primarily gold, lead and building materials (quarries).

== Wards ==
Prior to 2012, Mpanda District was administratively divided into thirty wards: After the 2012 reorganization, Mpanda District had eighteen wards.

=== 2002 census wards ===
- Ikola
- Ilela
- Ilembo
- Ilunde
- Inyonga
- Kabungu
- Karema
- Kashaulili
- Kasokola
- Katuma
- Kibaoni

=== 2022 census wards ===
- Shanwe
- Makanyagio
- Kashaulili
- Kawanjese
- Nsemulwa
- Majengo
- Kasokola
- Kazima
- Uwanja Wa Ndege
- Kakese
- Misunkumilo
- Mpanda Hotel
- Ilembo
- Mwamkulu
- Magamba

== Notable persons from Mpanda District ==
- Mizengo Pinda, 9th Tanzanian Prime Minister
