= Nirmal Assembly constituency =

Constituency of the Telangana legislative assembly in India

Coordinates: 19.09°N 78.34°E

Nirmal
- Constituency No. 9 for the Telangana Legislative Assembly
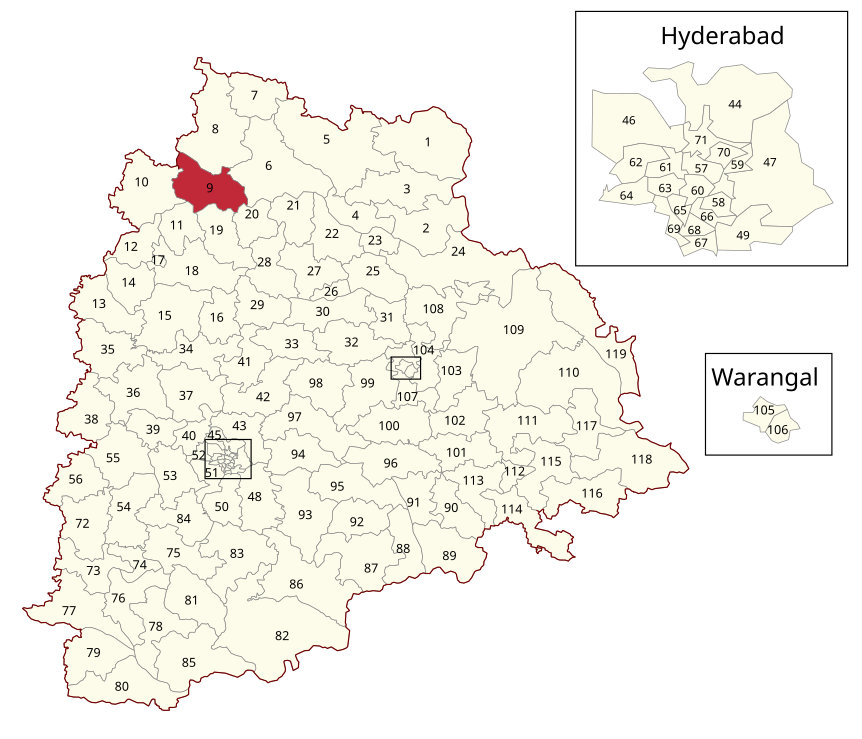
- Location of Nirmal Assembly constituency within Telangana

Constituency details
- Country: India
- Region: South India
- State: Telangana
- District: Nirmal
- Lok Sabha constituency: Adilabad
- Established: 1957
- Total electors: 2,38,000 (2019)
- Reservation: None

Member of Legislative Assembly
- 3rd Telangana Legislative Assembly
- Incumbent Alleti Maheshwar Reddy
- Party: Bharatiya Janata Party
- Elected year: 2023

Nirmal Assembly constituency is a constituency of the Telangana Legislative Assembly, India. It is one of three constituencies in Nirmal district. It comes under Adilabad Lok Sabha constituency along with six other assembly constituencies.

Alleti Maheshwar Reddy of Bharatiya Janata Party is representing the constituency.

== Mandals ==
The Assembly Constituency presently comprises the following Mandals:

Mandal
Nirmal
Dilawarpur
Laxmanchanda
Mamda
Sarangapur
Narsapur(G)
Soan
Nirmal Rural

== Members of Legislative Assembly ==
Year	Member	Party
Andhra Pradesh
1957	Koripally Muthyam Reddy	Independent
1962	P. Narsa Reddy	Indian National Congress
1967	P. Narsa Reddy	Indian National Congress
1972	P. Narsa Reddy	Indian National Congress
1978	Poddutoori Ganga Reddy	Indian National Congress
1983	Aindla Bheem Reddy	Telugu Desam Party
1985	Samudrala Venugopala Chary	Telugu Desam Party
1989	Samudrala Venugopala Chary	Telugu Desam Party
1994	Samudrala Venugopala Chary	Telugu Desam Party
1996	Nalla Indrakaran Reddy	Telugu Desam Party
1999	Allola Indrakaran Reddy	Indian National Congress
2004	Allola Indrakaran Reddy	Indian National Congress
2009	Alleti Maheshwar Reddy	Praja Rajyam Party
Telangana
2014	Allola Indrakaran Reddy	Bahujan Samaj Party
2018	Allola Indrakaran Reddy	Telangana Rashtra Samithi
2023	Alleti Maheshwar Reddy	Bharatiya Janata Party

== Election results ==
=== 2023 ===
2023 Telangana Legislative Assembly election: Nirmal
Party	Candidate	Votes	%	±%
BJP	Alleti Maheshwar Reddy	106,400	54.03	
BRS	Allola Indrakaran Reddy	55,697	28.28	
INC	K. Srihari Rao	28,642	14.54	
NOTA	None of the Above	1,526	0.77	
BSP	Devatha Jagan Mohan	959	0.49	
IND	5 Independent Candidates	2,650	1.34	
OTH	4 Other Party Candidates	1,057	0.54	
Majority		50,703	25.75	
Turnout		196,931	77.67	
BJP gain from TRS		Swing		

=== Telangana Legislative Assembly election, 2018 ===
Telangana Assembly Elections, 2018: Nirmal
Party	Candidate	Votes	%	±%
TRS	Allola Indrakaran Reddy	79,985	46.21	
INC	Alleti Maheshwar Reddy	70,714	40.86	
BJP	Aindla Swarna Reddy	16,900	9.76	
BSP	Soudani Bhumanna Yadav	1,845	1.07	
NOTA	None of the Above	1,367	0.79	
Majority		9,271	5.35	
Turnout		1,73,084	79.79	
TRS gain from BSP		Swing		

=== Telangana Legislative Assembly election, 2014 ===
Telangana Assembly Elections, 2014: Nirmal
Party	Candidate	Votes	%	±%
BSP	Allola Indrakaran Reddy	61,368	38.00	
TRS	Kuchadi Srihari Rao	52,871	32.73	
INC	Alleti Maheshwar Reddy	38,951	24.12	
TDP	Mirza Yaseen Baig	4,567	2.83	
NOTA	None of the above	1,365	0.85	
Majority		8,497	5.27	
Turnout		1,61,515	76.85	
BSP gain from PRP		Swing		

=== Andhra Pradesh Legislative Assembly election, 2009 ===
Andhra Pradesh Assembly Elections, 2009: Nirmal
Party	Candidate	Votes	%	±%
PRP	Alleti Maheshwar Reddy	44,261	33.64	
INC	Allola Indrakaran Reddy	41,716	31.71	
TRS	Kuchadi Srihari Rao	35,458	26.95	
Majority		2,545	1.93	
PRP gain from		Swing		

=== 2004 ===
Indrakaran reddy won 78,231

Allegiant Maheshwar Reddy 71,253

== See also ==
- List of constituencies of Telangana Legislative Assembly
