= Boath Assembly constituency =

Constituency of the Telangana legislative assembly in India

Coordinates: 19.35°N 78.32°E

Boath City
- Constituency No. 8 for the Telangana Legislative Assembly
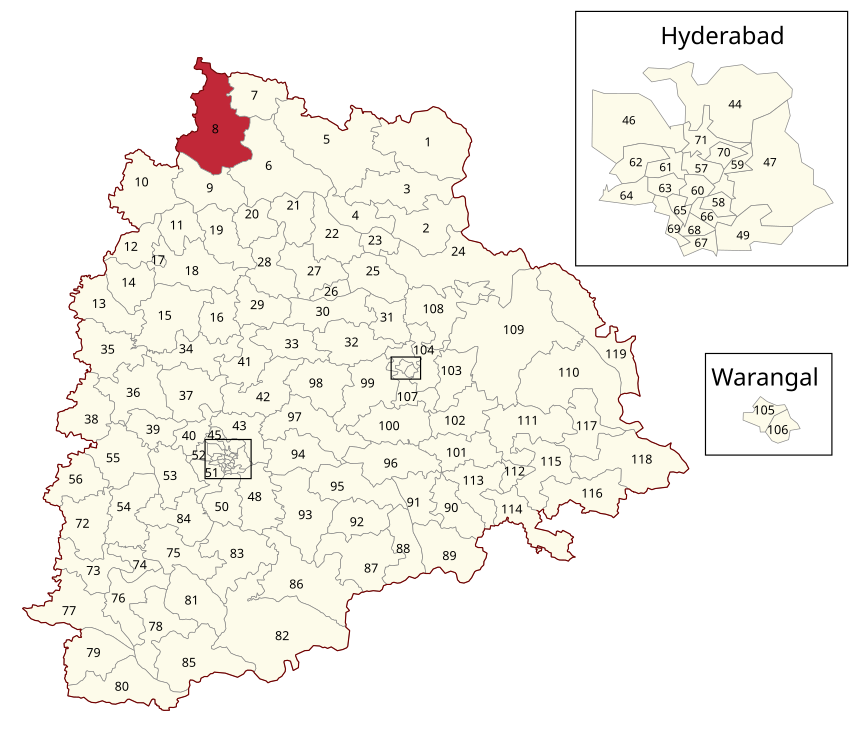
- Location of Boath City Assembly constituency within Telangana

Constituency details
- Country: India
- Region: South India
- State: Telangana
- District: Adilabad
- Lok Sabha constituency: Adilabad
- Established: 1962
- Total electors: 166,315
- Reservation: ST

Member of Legislative Assembly
- 3rd Telangana Legislative Assembly
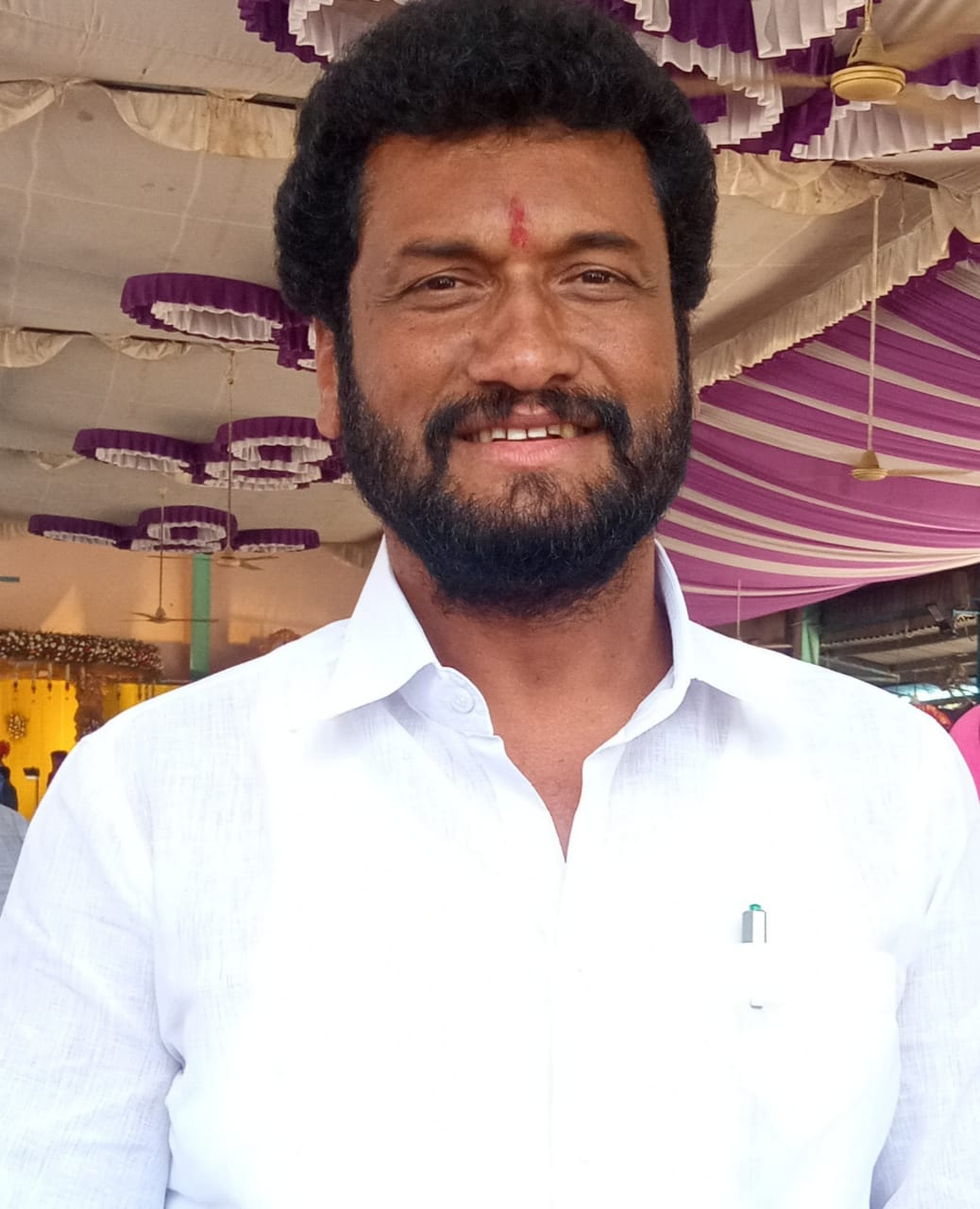
- Incumbent Anil Jadhav
- Party: Bharat Rashtra Samithi
- Elected year: 2023

Boath Assembly constituency is a constituency of the Telangana Legislative Assembly in India. It is one of two constituencies in Adilabad district. It comes under the Adilabad Lok Sabha constituency along with six other Assembly constituencies. Jadhav Anil Kumar of Telangana Rashtra Samithi is currently representing the constituency.

== Mandals ==
The Assembly Constituency presently comprises the following Mandals:

Mandal
Boath
Tamsi
Talamadugu
Ichoda
Bazarhathnoor
Neradigonda
Gudihathnur

== Members of Legislative Assembly ==
Year	Winner	Party	Opponent	Party
1962	C. Madhava Reddy	Indian National Congress	R. Reddy	Communist Party of India
1967	S. A. Devshah	Indian National Congress	D. Asha Rao	Communist Party of India
1972	S. A. Devshah	Indian National Congress	D.R. Rao	Communist Party of India
1978	Amar Singh Tilawat	Indian National Congress	Ganesh Jadhav	Janata Party
1983	M. Kasheeram	Indian National Congress	V.G.Reddy	Communist Party of India
1985	Ramarao Godam	Telugu Desam Party	S. Bheemarao	Indian National Congress
1989	Ramarao Godam	Telugu Desam Party	Amar Singh Kilavath	Indian National Congress
1994	Godam Nagesh	Telugu Desam Party	K. Chouhan	Indian National Congress
1999	Godam Nagesh	Telugu Desam Party	Kodapa Kosurao	Indian National Congress
2004	Bapurao Soyam	Telangana Rashtra Samithi	Godam Nagesh	Telugu Desam Party
2009	Godam Nagesh	Telugu Desam Party	Anil Jadhav	Indian National Congress
2014	Rathod Bapu Rao	Telangana Rashtra Samithi	Anil Jadhav	Indian National Congress
2018	Rathod Bapu Rao	Telangana Rashtra Samithi	Bapu Rao Soyam	Indian National Congress
2023	Anil Jadhav	Bharat Rashtra Samithi	Bapu Rao Soyam	Bharatiya Janata Party

== Election results ==
Vote share of Winning candidates
2023	44.13%
2018	38.99%
2014	45.39%
2009	55.92%
2004	53.49%
1999	56.17%
1994	65.27%
1989	38.58%
1985	60.81%
1983	45.14%
1978	47.73%
1972	58.15%
1967	52.19%
1962	57.45%

=== 2023 ===
2023 Telangana Legislative Assembly election: Boath (ST)
Party	Candidate	Votes	%	±%
BRS	Anil Jadhav	76,792	44.13	
BJP	Soyam Bapu Rao	53,992	31.03	
INC	Aade Gajender	32,797	18.85	
NOTA	None of the Above	2,565	1.47	
BSP	Mesram Jangubapu	2,071	1.19	
IND	2 Independent Candidates	2,113	1.21	
OTH	4 Other Party Candidates	3,688	2.11	
Majority		22,800	13.10	
Turnout		174,018	83.42	
BRS hold		Swing		

=== 2018 ===
2018 Telangana Legislative Assembly election: Boath (ST)
Party	Candidate	Votes	%	±%
TRS	Rathod Bapu Rao	61,125	38.99	
INC	Soyam Bapu Rao	54,639	34.85	
IND	Anil Jadhav	28,206	17.99	
BJP	Madavi Raju	4,840	3.09	
BSP	Gajender Aade	2,658	1.70	
NOTA	None of the Above	2,275	1.45	
NCP	Kumram Koteshwar	1,915	1.22	
IND	Ram Chowhan	1,104	0.70	
Majority		6,486	4.14	
Turnout		156,762	85.52	
TRS hold		Swing		

=== 2014 ===
2014 Telangana Legislative Assembly election: Boath (ST)
Party	Candidate	Votes	%	±%
TRS	Rathod Bapu Rao	62,870	45.39	
INC	Anil Jadhav	35,877	25.90	
TDP	Soyam Bapu Rao	35,218	25.43	
NOTA	None of the Above	2,246	1.62	
YSRCP	Gedam Tulasi Das	1,281	0.92	
RLD	Mesram Nanda Kishore	1,007	0.73	
Majority		26,993	19.49	
Turnout		138,499	78.60	
TRS gain from TDP		Swing		

=== 2009 ===
2009 Andhra Pradesh Legislative Assembly election: Boath (ST)
Party	Candidate	Votes	%	±%
TDP	Godam Nagesh	64,895	55.92	
INC	Anil Kumar Jadhav	33,900	29.21	
PRP	Thodsam Vijayalaxmi	7,851	6.77	
BJP	Ade Manaji	5,827	5.02	
IND	Mesram Bheemrao	1,852	1.60	
IND	Kova Manohar	898	0.77	
IND	Atram Gnanasudha	817	0.70	
Majority		30,995	26.71	
Turnout		116,040		
TDP gain from TRS		Swing		

=== 2004 ===
2004 Andhra Pradesh Legislative Assembly election: Boath (ST)
Party	Candidate	Votes	%	±%
TRS	Soyam Bapurao	53,940	53.49	
TDP	Godam Nagesh	41,567	41.22	
JP	Madavi Raju	3,491	3.46	
IND	Pendur Neelam	1,853	1.84	
Majority		12,373	12.27	
Turnout		100,851		
TRS gain from TDP		Swing		

=== 1999 ===
1999 Andhra Pradesh Legislative Assembly election: Boath (ST)
Party	Candidate	Votes	%	±%
TDP	Godam Nagesh	49,155	56.17	
INC	Kodapa Kosu Rao	29,420	33.62	
CPI	D. Rama Rao Naik	8,156	9.32	
IND	Mesram Dev Rao	600	0.69	
IND	Jadav Prem Singh	182	0.21	
Majority		19,735	22.55	
Turnout		90,856	70.93	
TDP hold		Swing		

=== 1994 ===
1994 Andhra Pradesh Legislative Assembly election: Boath (ST)
Party	Candidate	Votes	%	±%
TDP	Godem Nagesh	51,593	65.27	
INC	Kishan Chauhan	10,520	13.31	
IND	Amarsingh Tilawat	8,700	11.01	
BJP	Roopchand Jadhav	5,063	6.41	
BSP	Sabavat Ramulu Naik	1,970	2.49	
IND	Pendur Laxman Rao	862	1.09	
IND	Naitham Jalpath Rao	337	0.43	
Majority		41,073	51.96	
Turnout		81,937	71.33	
TDP hold		Swing		

=== 1989 ===
1989 Andhra Pradesh Legislative Assembly election: Boath (ST)
Party	Candidate	Votes	%	±%
TDP	Ghodam Rama Rao	18,704	38.58	
INC	Amar Singh Tilawat	15,109	31.16	
IND	Sidam Bheem Rao	14,673	30.26	
Majority		3,595	7.42	
Turnout		52,548	49.79	
TDP hold		Swing		

=== 1985 ===
1985 Andhra Pradesh Legislative Assembly election: Boath (ST)
Party	Candidate	Votes	%	±%
TDP	Godam Rama Rao	25,539	60.81	
INC	Sidam Bheem Rao	11,206	26.68	
IND	Amar Singh	2,756	6.56	
IND	Meshram Dev Rao	2,497	5.95	
Majority		14,333	34.13	
Turnout		43,375	52.18	
TDP gain from INC		Swing		

=== 1983 ===
1983 Andhra Pradesh Legislative Assembly election: Boath (ST)
Party	Candidate	Votes	%	±%
INC	Kasiram Marsakota	22,578	45.14	
CPI	Vannela Ganga Reddy	13,243	26.48	
IND	Kishan	10,763	21.52	
IND	Jadav Roopchand	3,036	6.07	
IND	Sidam Bheem Rao	394	0.79	
Majority		9,335	18.66	
Turnout		51,949	65.37	
INC gain from INC(I)		Swing		

=== 1978 ===
1978 Andhra Pradesh Legislative Assembly election: Boath (ST)
Party	Candidate	Votes	%	±%
INC(I)	T. Amar Singh	22,333	47.73	
JP	Ganesh Jadhav	7,071	15.11	
IND	Kinaka Beershaw	6,458	13.80	
INC	Roopchand Jadhav	4,294	9.18	
IND	Sale Singh Jadav	4,080	8.72	
IND	Parasa Anmanth Rao	2,556	5.46	
Majority		15,262	32.62	
Turnout		49,450	69.62	
INC(I) gain from INC		Swing		

=== 1972 ===
1972 Andhra Pradesh Legislative Assembly election: Boath (ST)
Party	Candidate	Votes	%	±%
INC	S. A. Dev Shah	24,181	58.15	
CPI	Arka Rama Rao	11,242	27.04	
IND	Marakula Kasiram	6,159	14.81	
Majority		12,939	31.11	
Turnout		44,264	52.19	
INC hold		Swing		

=== 1967 ===
1967 Andhra Pradesh Legislative Assembly election: Boath (ST)
Party	Candidate	Votes	%	±%
INC	S. A. Devshah	16,299	52.19	
CPI	D. A. Rao	10,676	34.19	
ABJS	M. K. Ram	4,255	13.62	
Majority		5,623	18.00	
Turnout		33,777	54.20	
INC hold		Swing		

=== 1962 ===
1962 Andhra Pradesh Legislative Assembly election: Boath
Party	Candidate	Votes	%	±%
INC	C. Madhav Reddi	15,990	57.45	
CPI	Raja Reddy	10,236	36.78	
IND	Linganna	971	3.49	
IND	Ganga Malleshwar	634	2.28	
Majority		5,754	20.67	
Turnout		29,683	55.24	
INC win (new seat)				

== See also ==
- List of constituencies of Telangana Legislative Assembly
