= Allola Indrakaran Reddy =

Indian politician

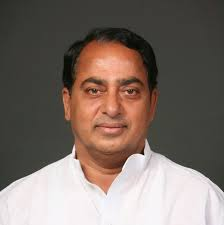
- Portrait of Indrakaran Reddy

Minister of Department of Endowments (Telangana), Law, Forest and Environment, Science and Technology Government of Telangana
- In office 19 February 2019 – 04 December 2023
- Preceded by: Office established
- Succeeded by: Konda Surekha

Minister of Endowments, Law, Housing Government of Telangana
- In office 2014–2018
- Constituency: Nirmal

Member of the Telangana Assembly
- In office 2014–2023
- Preceded by: Alleti Maheshwar Reddy
- Succeeded by: Alleti Maheshwar Reddy
- Constituency: Nirmal

Member of the Legislative Assembly United Andhra Pradesh
- In office 1999–2008
- Preceded by: Nalla Indrakiran Reddy
- Succeeded by: Alleti Maheshwar Reddy
- Constituency: Nirmal

Member of Parliament, Lok Sabha
- In office 2008 – May 2009
- Preceded by: Madhusudhan Reddy Takkala
- Succeeded by: Ramesh Rathod
- Constituency: Adilabad
- In office 1991–1996
- Preceded by: P. Narsa Reddy
- Succeeded by: Samudrala Venugopal Chary
- Constituency: Adilabad

Personal details
- Born: 16 February 1949 (age 77) Ellapelly, Telangana
- Party: Indian National Congress
- Other political affiliations: Bharat Rashtra Samithi Telugu Desam Party Bahujan Samaj Party
- Spouse: Mrs. A. Vijaya Laxmi
- Parent: Mr. A. Narayan Reddy (father)
- Education: Osmania University
- Profession: Agriculturist, Social worker & Politician
- Committees: None

Allola Indrakaran Reddy is an Indian politician who was the Minister of State for Endowments, Law and Forest, Environment, Science and Technology of Telangana since 2019. He was elected as MLA of Nirmal in 2014 General Election as BSP candidate and won over Sri Hari Rao by margin of 10,000 votes. He later joined the TRS Party and became Minister in charge of law, housing and endowments. He was Member of Parliament of India. He was a member of the 10th and 14th Lok Sabhas. Reddy represented the Adilabad constituency of United Andhra Pradesh.

Allola Indrakaran Reddy quit the BRS party and joined Congress party on 1 May 2024 in the presence of AICC in-charge Deepa Dasmunsi.

== Political timeline and affiliations ==
The following table outlines the political career and party affiliations of Allola Indrakaran Reddy:

Year	Party	Note
1991	Telugu Desam Party	Associated with TDP
1996	Indian National Congress	Joined Indian National Congress
2012	YSR Congress Party	Joined YSR Congress Party
2014	Bahujan Samaj Party	Joined Bahujan Samaj Party
2014	Telangana Rashtra Samithi	Joined Telangana Rashtra Samithi
2024	Indian National Congress	Rejoined Indian National Congress

== Early life and education ==
Allola Indrakaran Reddy was born in Yellapally, a village near Nirmal, former Adilabad district, in the state of United Andhra Pradesh. He attended Osmania University and attained B.Com. and LL.B. degrees. By profession, Reddy is an agriculturist and a social worker. His family includes Allola Manya Reddy and others

== Political career ==
Reddy has been in active politics since early 1980s. Prior to becoming a M.P. he was also the Chairman of Zila Parishad. He was elected as a member of the legislative assembly from Nirmal, Adilabad from 1999 to 2009 for the Indian National Congress. In 2008, Reddy was elected into the 14th Lok Sabha after the by-elections. Reddy was member of Telugu Desam Party during his term in the 10th Lok Sabha. In 2018, he contested from and got elected as a MLA from Nirmal (Assembly constituency) in the state of Telangana.

== Electoral History ==
Year	Constituency	Party	Votes	%	Opponent	Party	Votes	%	Result	Margin	%
1991	Adilabad	TDP	2,32,540	46.33	P. Narsa Reddy	INC	1,94,130	38.68	Won	+38,410	+7.65
1996	Adilabad	INC	2,49,117	35.85	Samudrala Venugopal Chary	TDP	2,86,477	41.22	Lost	-37,360	-5.37
1998	Adilabad	INC	2,57,634	37.07	Samudrala Venugopal Chary	TDP	2,91,168	41.89	Lost	-33,534	-4.82
1999	Nirmal	INC	62,523	54.91	Nalla Indrakaran Reddy	TDP	47,477	41.70	Won	+15,046	+13.21
2004	Nirmal	INC	70,249	57.21	V. Satyanarayana Goud	TDP	45,671	37.20	Won	+24,578	+20.01
2008 (Note: By-election)	Adilabad	INC	3,22,410	43.14	T. Madhusudan Reddy	TRS	2,80,260	37.50	Won	+42,150	+5.64
2009	Nirmal	INC	41,716	31.71	Alleti Maheshwar Reddy	PRP	44,261	33.64	Lost	-2,545	-1.93
2010	Sirpur	INC	41,033	30.70	Kaveti Sammaiah	TRS	56,262	42.10	Lost	-15,229	-11.40
2014	Nirmal	BSP	61,368	38.00	Kuchadi Srihari Rao	TRS	52,871	32.73	Won	+8,497	+5.27
2018	Nirmal	TRS	79,985	46.21	Alleti Maheshwar Reddy	INC	70,714	40.86	Won	+9,271	+5.35
2023	Nirmal	BRS	55,697	28.28	Alleti Maheshwar Reddy	BJP	1,06,400	54.03	Lost	-50,703	-25.75

== Posts held ==
#	From	To	Position	Comments
01	1991	1996	Member, 10th Lok Sabha	
02	1999	2004	Member, 11th Andhra Pradesh Legislative Assembly	
03	2004	2008	Member, 12th Andhra Pradesh Legislative Assembly	
04	2008	2009	Member, 14th Lok Sabha	Elected in By-elections
05	2014	2018	Member, 1st Telangana Legislative Assembly	
06	2018	2023	Member, 2nd Telangana Legislative Assembly	
07	2023	2023	Candidate for 2023 Election 3rd Telangana Legislative Assembly	lost in general Election 2023.

== See also ==
- 10th and 14th Lok Sabha
- Adilabad (Lok Sabha constituency)
- Andhra Pradesh Legislative Assembly
- Government of India
- Indian National Congress
- Lok Sabha
- Nirmal (Assembly constituency)
- Parliament of India
- Politics of India
- Telugu Desam Party
