= Nirmal toys and craft =

Traditional Indian wooden toys

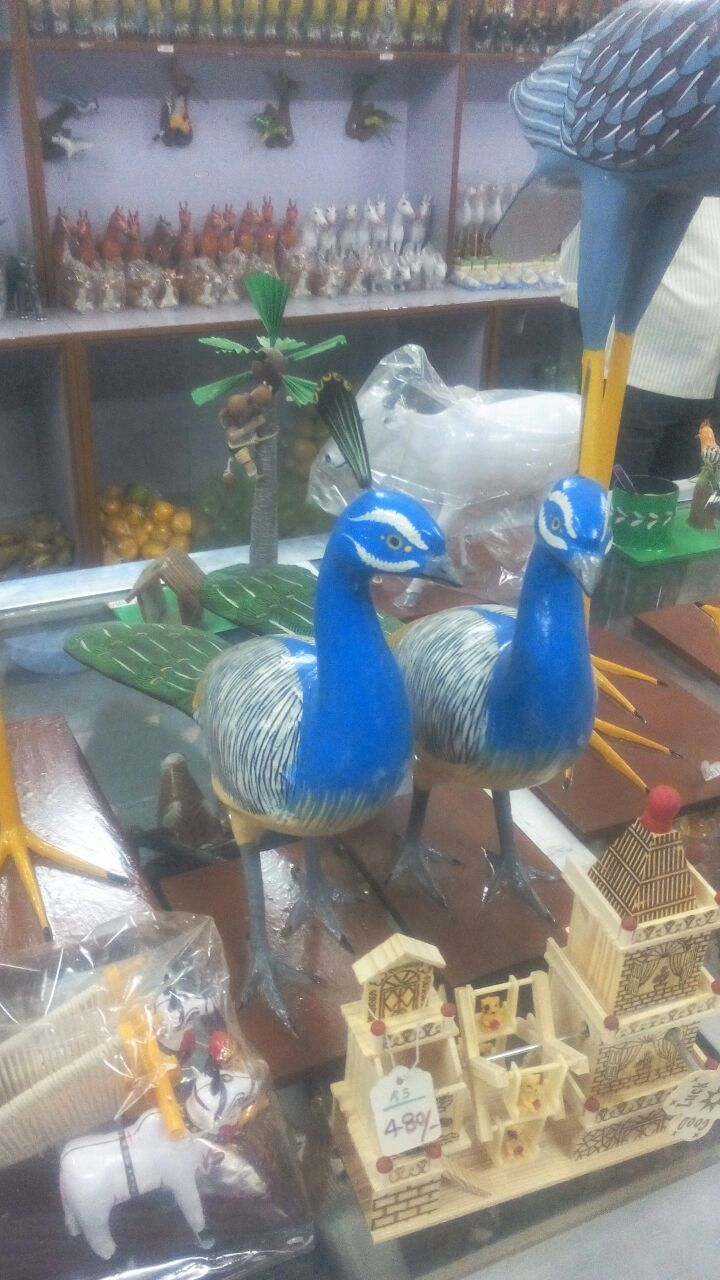
Nirmal wooden toys-peacock couple

Nirmal toys are traditional Indian wooden toys made in the town of Nirmal in the Adilabad district in the state of Telangana in India. The Telugu movie “Radha krishna” is based on these toys

== History ==
Nirmal Art, encompassing a 400-year-old tradition of making soft wood toys and paintings, occupies a place of pride in the world of handicrafts. The finely carved figures and dainty paintings are still being used to decorate drawing rooms in thousands of homes across the country. Nirmal district in Telangana was once famous as a production centre of as diverse things as cannons and toys. While the foundry supplied heavy artillery to the army of the Nizam of Hyderabad, the Naqqash craftsmen and artists brought out exquisite wooden toys and duco paintings under the name of Nirmal Art. The foundry was closed soon after Hyderabad's accession, but the art form has survived many ups and downs, the most impacting being the loss of its patron, the Nizam. Elegant toys and paintings continue to be produced by the Naqqash artisans at this town located just 4 km off the new four lane National Highway No. 44 about 220 km from Hyderabad. Though no records pertaining to their origins exist now, it is believed the Naqqash families were brought here from Rajasthan in the 17th century by Neema Naik (or Nimma Naidu according to another version), the local chieftain after whom the town itself is named. Many changes have since been incorporated in their art form obviously to suit the taste of the patrons of the time.

== Description ==
Initially, the Naqqash, or Jingar artisans, had produced only toys from the locally available variety of softwood called poniki or white sander. They made wooden furniture during the last Nizam's rule. Now, they are carved from local softwood and painted with Duco paints. The Jingars have discontinued making the fine Kishti (tray), Khanchibba chowki (settee) or the Palang (cot) owing to the change in customs. "These articles were used as dowry gifts in marriages and were ordered mostly by the Muslim nobility during the time of the Nizam". Ganjifa playing cards are also traditionally made in Nirmal, but as of February 2011, only one elderly artisan was still making them. The artists shifted from natural dyes to duco paints. Due to use of the duco colours, the Nirmal paintings acquire a typical shine. The toys are also painted in enamel colours giving them the sheen they are known for.

== See also ==
- Channapatna toys
- Nirmal furniture
- Nirmal paintings
