= Muthiam Reddy =

Koripally Muthyam Reddy

MLA, 1st Assembly
- In office Mar 1957 – Feb 1962
- Constituency: Nirmal
- Succeeded by: P. Narsa Reddy

Personal details
- Born: Nirmal, Adilabad district (Andhra Pradesh)
- Died: 3 September 1982
- Citizenship: India
- Party: Independent
- Profession: Politician

Koripally Muthyam Reddy was an Indian politician and Member of the Legislative Assembly during the 1st Assembly of Andhra Pradesh from 1957 to 1962.

== Political career ==
Muthiam Reddy was Member of the Legislative Assembly for one term from 1957 to 1962 from Nirmal. He contested as an independent candidate and defeated P. Narsa Reddy of the Indian National Congress political party.

== Posts held ==
| # | From | To | Position | Comments |
|---|---|---|---|---|
| 01 | 1957 | 1962 | Member, 1st Assembly | |

== See also ==
- Andhra Pradesh Legislative Assembly
- Government of India
- Nirmal (Assembly constituency)
- Politics of India
