= Soyam Bapu Rao =

Indian politician (born 1969)

Bapu Rao Soyam

Member of Parliament, Lok Sabha
- In office 2019–2024
- Preceded by: Godam Nagesh
- Succeeded by: Godam Nagesh
- Constituency: Adilabad, Telangana

Member of Telangana Legislative Assembly
- In office 2004–2009
- Preceded by: Godam Nagesh
- Succeeded by: Godam Nagesh
- Constituency: Boath

Personal details
- Born: 28 April 1969 (age 57)
- Party: Indian National Congress
- Other political affiliations: Bharat Rashtra Samithi; Bharatiya Janata Party
- Children: 3

Bapu Rao Soyam is an Indian politician. He was elected to the Lok Sabha, the lower house of the Parliament of India from Adilabad, Telangana in the 2019 Indian general election as a member of the Bharatiya Janata Party.

== Early life ==
Soyam Bapu Rao was born on 28 April 1969 in Wajjar of Adilabad, Telangana. He married Barathi Bai and has two sons and a daughter.

== Career ==
Soyam Bapu Rao was elected as a MLA for Andhra Pradesh Assembly from a Boath, Adilabad district in 2004. In 2014 elections, Bapu Rao contested as a Telugu Desam Party candidate from Boath and lost to Rathod Bapu Rao. After the division of the state he joined in Indian Congress and contested the 2018 elections from Boath and lost to Rathod Bapu Rao.

In 2019 India General election, Soyam Bapu Rao of BJP won the Adilabad Lok Sabha constituency with a margin of 58,560 votes by defeating Godam Nagesh of TRS. Soyam Bapu Rao who secured 377,374 votes.

Soyam Bapu Rao was denied BJP Ticket in 2024 India General election and later on 5 December 2024 he joined Indian National Congress in the presence of TPCC president B. Mahesh Kumar Goud at Gandhi Bhavan, Hyderabad.
