= P. Narsa Reddy =

Indian politician (1931–2024)

Member of Parliament, Lok Sabha
- In office 1989–1991
- Preceded by: C. Madhava Reddi
- Succeeded by: Allola Indrakaran Reddy
- Constituency: Adilabad

Member of the Legislative Assembly United Andhra Pradesh
- In office 1962 – 1978
- Preceded by: Muthiam Reddy
- Succeeded by: P. Ganga Reddy
- Constituency: Nirmal

Personal details
- Born: 22 September 1931 Nirmal, Adilabad district, Hyderabad State, India
- Died: 29 January 2024 (aged 92) Hyderabad, Telangana, India
- Citizenship: Indian
- Party: Indian National Congress
- Spouse: Kausalya Devi
- Children: Three sons, one daughter
- Parent: [Ganga Reddy] (father) Chandra amma (mother)
- Education: Osmania University
- Profession: Agriculturist, lawyer, politician
- Committees: Member of several committees
- Portfolio: Various

P. Narsa Reddy (22 September 1931 – 29 January 2024) was an Indian independence activist and politician who was a Member of Parliament of the 9th Lok Sabha of India. Reddy represented the Adilabad constituency of Andhra Pradesh and was a member of the Indian National Congress political party.

== Early life and education ==
P. Narsa Reddy was born in Nirmal, Adilabad district in the state of Andhra Pradesh. He attended the Osmania University and attained BA & LL.B degrees. By profession, Reddy was an Agriculturist and a Lawyer.

== Political career ==
=== Pre independence ===
P. Narsa Reddy was an Indian freedom fighter, participated in the struggle to liberate Hyderabad from Nizam's Rule.

=== Post independence ===
P. Narsa Reddy was active politics from the early 1940s. Prior to becoming an MP he was also Member of the Legislative Assembly (India) for three straight terms and member of Andhra Pradesh Legislative Council for one term. In 1971, he was the President of Andhra Pradesh Congress Committee.

Reddy died in Hyderabad, Telangana on 29 January 2024, at the age of 92.

== Posts held ==
#	From	To	Position	Comments
01	1962	1967	Member, 03rd Assembly	
02	1962	1964	Chairman, Development Committee on Telangana	
03	1967	1972	Member, 04th Assembly	
04	1968	1968	Member, Rules Committee	
05	1972	1978	Member, 05th Assembly	
06	1973	1978	Cabinet Minister, Irrigation (State government)	
07	1974	1978	Cabinet Minister, Revenue & Legislative Affairs (State government).	
08	1981	1985	Member, Andhra Pradesh Legislative Council	
09	1982	1985	Member, Committee on Government Assurances	
10	1989	1991	Member, 09th Lok Sabha	
11	1990	1991	Member, Committee on Petitions	
12	1990	1991	Consultative Committee, Ministry of Labour	
14	1990	1991	Consultative Committee, Ministry of Welfare	

== See also ==
- 9th Lok Sabha
- Adilabad (Lok Sabha constituency)
- Andhra Pradesh Legislative Assembly
- Government of India
- Indian National Congress
- Lok Sabha
- Nirmal (Assembly constituency)
- Parliament of India
- Politics of India
