= Ramesh Rathod =

Indian politician (1966–2024)

Member of Parliament, Lok Sabha
- In office 2009–2014
- Preceded by: Allola Indrakaran Reddy
- Succeeded by: Godam Nagesh
- Constituency: Adilabad

Member Of Andhra Pradesh Legislative Assembly
- In office 1999–2004
- Preceded by: Ajmeera Govind Naik
- Succeeded by: Ajmeera Govind Naik
- Constituency: Khanapur

Personal details
- Born: 20 October 1966 Tadihatnur, Narnoor, British India
- Died: 29 June 2024 (aged 57) Adilabad, Telangana, India
- Party: Bharatiya Janata Party
- Other political affiliations: Telugu Desam Party; Bharat Rashtra Samithi; Indian National Congress

Ramesh Rathod (20 October 1966 – 29 June 2024) was an Indian politician from the state of Telangana. He was born in Tadihadpanur of Adilabad District and belonged to the Bharatiya Janata Party from 2021. In the 2009 election he was elected as a Member of Parliament (MP) from the Telugu Desam Party to the Lok Sabha from the Adilabad constituency of erstwhile Andhra Pradesh.

== Political career ==
A first-time MP, he belonged to the Scheduled Tribes caste. A grassroots politician, he had a long association with local causes in the state. He was elected to Andhra Pradesh State Legislative Assembly in 1999 from Khanapur Assembly Seat (reserved for STs). He was also the Chairman of the Adilabad Zilla Parishad (2006–09). His wife, Mrs Suman Rathod represented the Khanapur assembly seat (2009–14) and also he was elected as MLA from Khanapur assembly. He contested from the Congress party in the 2018 Telangana assembly elections.

In June 2021, he joined BJP following a controversial resignation of Etela Rajender. He unsuccessfully contested from Kanapur in the 2023 Assembly polls and was denied a ticket from Adilabad in the Lok Sabha elections 2024.

== Death ==
Rathod died whilst being moved to a hospital in Hyderabad, on 29 June 2024, at the age of 57. He had been admitted to a private hospital, in Adilabad, due to multiple organ failure, after vomiting and experiencing upper gastrointestinal bleeding.

Preceded by Madhusudhan Reddy Takkala	Member of Parliament from Adilabad; 2009–2014	Succeeded by Godam Nagesh
