= Nirmal paintings =

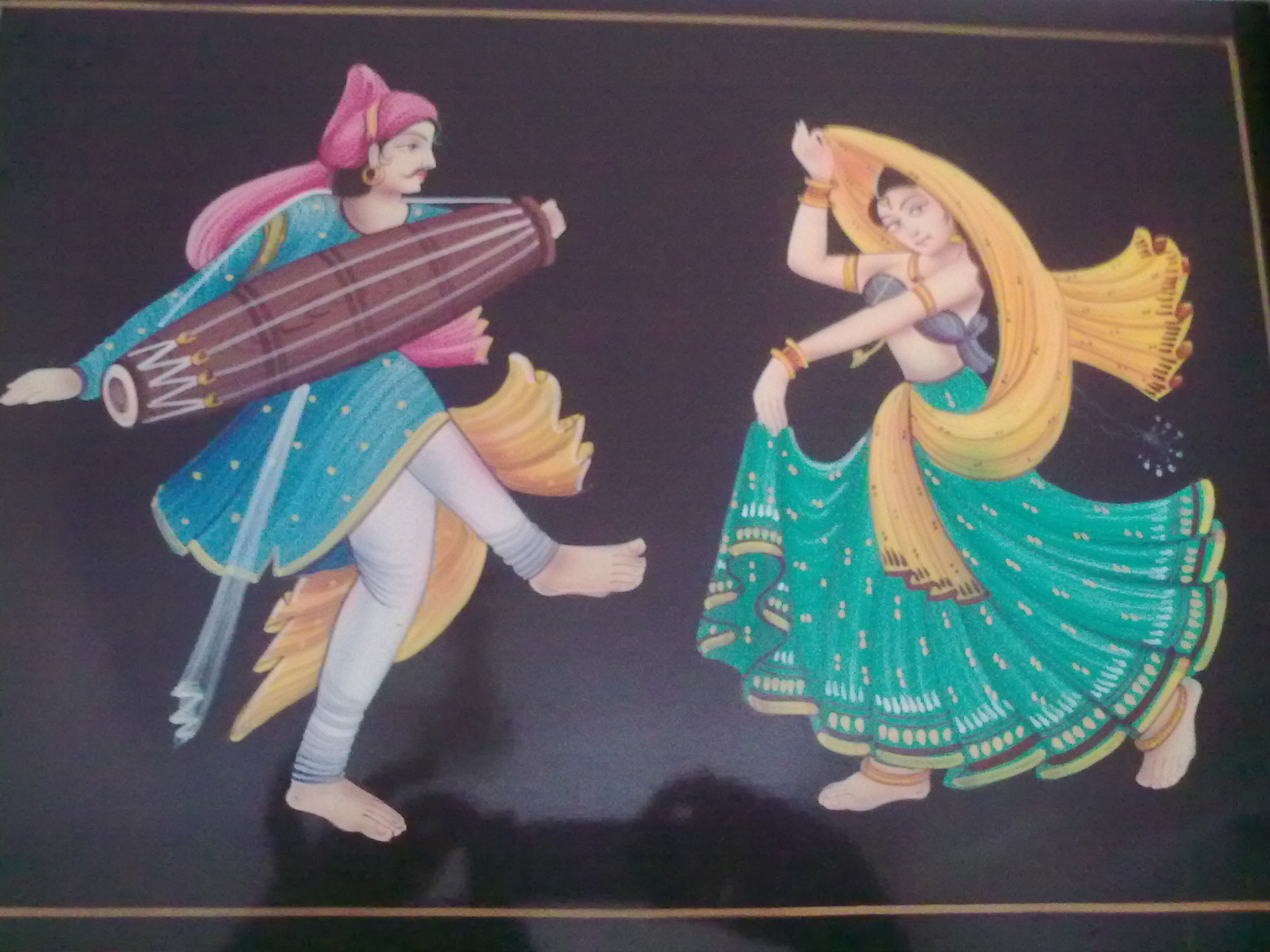
Nirmal painting

Nirmal Paintings are a popular form of paintings done in Nirmal in Nirmal District, Telangana, India. They form a small-scale industry in the town. The craftsmen have formed a community and stay at Nirmal and practice their art in the form of a small-scale business. The paintings have golden hues.

== History ==
This art form has derived its name from the place of its origin, Nirmal. This art was practiced in the 14th century by a group of artisans who are known as Naqash. The Mughals loved the art so much that they patronized the skill and art. It was in the 1950s that Lady Hyderi brought these artisans to the princely state of Hyderabad and promoted their craft. The colours of these paintings are extracted from minerals, herbs and various other plants. The themes of these paintings have drawn influence from Ajanta and other Mughul art. The painting of this dazzling gold are set against the backdrop of black.

== Creation process ==
The first step is to lacquer the wood surface and then paint the precise design on it. Other designs can be traced and then drawn with the help of chalk. Then the paintings happen with bright colours and finally touched with gold and then varnished.

== Nirmal toys ==
These toys are made from the extract of herbs which are given golden finishing. These toys usually revolve around human occupations and animals. They are made up of wood and then the painting is done over it.

== See also ==
- Nirmal toys and craft
- Nirmal furniture
- Mysore Traditional Paintings
