= 1967 Andhra Pradesh Legislative Assembly election =

- 21 February 1967

All 287 seats in the Andhra Pradesh Legislative Assembly 144 seats needed for a majority
- Registered: 20,934,068
- Turnout: 14,476,108 (69.15%) ▲5.15%
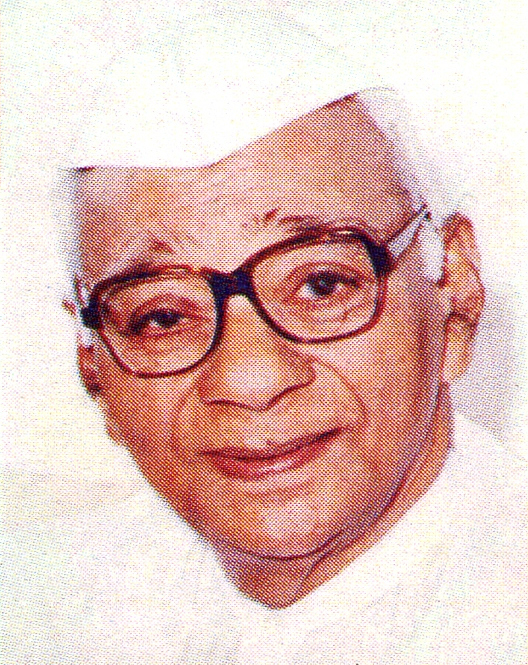

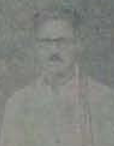

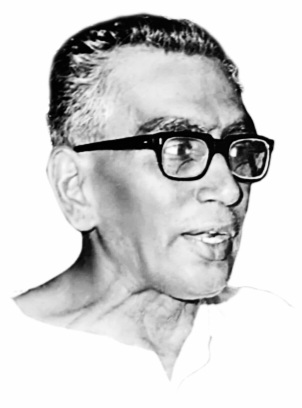
	Majority party	Minority party	Third party
Leader	Kasu Brahmananda Reddy	Gouthu Latchanna	T. Nagi Reddy
Party	INC	SWA	CPI
Leader since	1964	1958	1962
Leader's seat	Narasaraopet (won)	Sompeta (won)	Anantapur (won)
Last election	177 seats, 47.25%	19 seats, 10.40%	51 seats, 19.53%
Seats won	165	29	11
Seat change	▼12	▲10	▼40
Popular vote	6,292,649	1,363,382	1,077,499
Percentage	45.42%	9.84%	7.78%
Swing	▼1.83%	▼0.56%	▼11.75%
- 1967 Andhra Pradesh Legislative Assembly election results
Chief Minister before election
Kasu Brahmananda Reddy
INC
Chief Minister after election
Kasu Brahmananda Reddy
INC

The 1967 Andhra Pradesh Legislative Assembly election were held in 1967. Out of a total of 1,067 candidates for 287 seats, 276 men and 11 women were elected. The Indian National Congress (INC) won 165 seats, the Swatantra Party (SWA) won 29 seats, and the Independents won 68 seats.

Out of the 287 contested seats, 236 were allocated for general candidates, 11 were reserved for Scheduled Tribes, and 40 were reserved for Scheduled Castes.

== Results ==
Party	Votes	%	+/–	Seats	+/–
Indian National Congress	6,292,649	45.42	▼1.83%	165	▼12
Swatantra Party	1,363,382	9.84	▼0.56%	29	▲10
Communist Party of India	1,077,499	7.78	▼11.75%	11	▼40
Communist Party of India (Marxist)	1,053,855	7.61	new party	9	new party
Bharatiya Jana Sangh	291,783	2.11	▲1.07%	3	▲3
Samyukta Socialist Party	49,669	0.36	new party	1	new party
Republican Party of India	36,757	0.27	▼0.03%	1	▲1
Praja Socialist Party	28,564	0.21	▼0.09%	0	Steady
Independents	3,658,928	26.41	▲5.93%	68	▲17
Total	13,853,086	100.00	–	287	▼13
Valid votes	13,853,086	95.70			
Invalid/blank votes	623,022	4.30			
Total votes	14,476,108	100.00			
Registered voters/turnout	20,934,068	69.15			

== List of Assembly constituencies and winners ==
#	Constituency	Reserved for (SC/ST/None)	Member	Party
1	Ichapuram	None	L.K. Reddy	Swatantra Party
2	Sompeta	None	Gouthu Latchanna	Swatantra Party
3	Tekkali	None	N.Ramulu	Swatantra Party
4	Harischandrapuram	None	K.Krishnamurty	Swatantra Party
5	Narasannapeta	None	S.Jagannadham	Swatantra Party
6	Pataptnam	SC	P.Gunnayya	Indian National Congress
7	Kothuru	ST	M.Subbanna	Indian National Congress
8	Naguru	ST	Sethruchrla P. R. Raju	Swatantra Party
9	Parvathipuram	None	V.Ramanaidu	Swatantra Party
10	Salur	ST	B.Rajayya	Independent
11	Bobbili	None	R. S. Ramakrishna Ranga Rao	Independent
12	Pedamanapuram	None	V.N.Appalanaidu	Independent
13	Vunukuru	None	M.B.Parankusam	Independent
14	Palakonda	SC	J.Joji	Swatantra Party
15	Nagarikatakam	None	T.Paparao	Indian National Congress
16	Srikakulam	None	Tangi Satyanarayana	Swatantra Party
17	Etcherla	None	N. A. Naidu	Indian National Congress
18	Ponduru	None	C.Satyanarayna	Swatantra Party
19	Cheepurupalli	None	T. R. Rao	Independent
20	Gajapathinagaram	None	Penumatsa Sambasiva Raju	Independent
21	Vizianagaram	None	Vobbilisetty Ramarao	Bharatiya Jana Sangh
22	Bhogapuram	None	K. Aappadu Dora	Indian National Congress
23	Bheemunipatnam	None	Pusapati Vijayarama Gajapati Raju	Indian National Congress
24	Visakhapatnam I	None	Tenneti Viswanadham	Independent
25	Visakhapatnam Ii	None	P.Sanyasirao	Communist Party of India
26	Jami	None	G.B.Apparao	Swatantra Party
27	Madugula	None	R. K. Devi	Indian National Congress
28	Srungavarapukota	None	Kolla Appala Naidu	Independent
29	Paderu	ST	T.Chittinaidu	Indian National Congress
30	Gompa	None	G.Krishnamnaidu	Indian National Congress
31	Chodavaram	None	Palavelli Vechalapu	Swatantra Party
32	Anakapalli	None	Koduganti Govindarao	Communist Party of India
33	Paravada	None	S. R. A. S. Appala Naidu	Indian National Congress
34	Elamanchili	None	N.Satyanarayana	Independent
35	Payakaraopeta	SC	G.Suryanarayana	Indian National Congress
36	Narsipatnam	None	S.Suryanarayanaraju	Indian National Congress
37	Chintapalli	ST	D.Kondalrao	Indian National Congress
38	Yellavaram	ST	M. Chodi	Indian National Congress
39	Burugupudi	None	V. Kandru	Indian National Congress
40	Rajahmundry	None	C.P.Chaudari	Communist Party of India
41	Kadiam	SC	B.Subbarao	Indian National Congress
42	Jaggampeta	None	K. Pantam	Independent
43	Peddapuram	None	Vundavalli Narayana Murthy	Communist Party of India
44	Prathipadu	None	M.Veeraraghavarao	Independent
45	Tuni	None	V.V.Krishnamraju	Indian National Congress
46	Pithapuram	None	Yalla Suryanarayanamurty	Indian National Congress
47	Sampara	None	Cherukuveda Venkataratnam	Indian National Congress
48	Kakinada	None	C.V.Krishna Rao	Independent
49	Tallarevu	SC	E. Vadapalli	Indian National Congress
50	Anaparthi	None	Valluri Ramakrishana Chowdary	Indian National Congress
51	Ramachandrapuram	None	N.Veerraju	Independent
52	Pamarru	None	Sangitha Venkata Reddy	Independent
53	Cheyyeru	None	C.B.Krishnamraju	Independent
54	Allavaram	SC	B.V.Ramanayya	Communist Party of India
55	Amalapuram	None	Kudupudi Prabhakara Rao	Independent
56	Kothapeta	None	M.V.Suryasubharaju	Indian National Congress
57	Nagaram	SC	M.Geddam	Indian National Congress
58	Razole	None	G. R. Nayinala	Indian National Congress
59	Narasapur	None	Rudraraju Suryanarayanaraju	Communist Party of India
60	Palacole	None	Parakala Seshavatharam	Communist Party of India
61	Achanta	SC	D.Perumallu	Indian National Congress
62	Bhimavaram	None	Bhupathiraju Vijayakumar Raju	Independent
63	Undi	None	K.K.Rao	Independent
64	Penugonda	None	J.Lakshmayya	Indian National Congress
65	Tanuku	None	G.Satyanarayana	Independent
66	Attili	None	K.Vijayanarasimharaju	Indian National Congress
67	Tadepaligudem	None	A.Krishnarao	Indian National Congress
68	Ungutur	None	C.S.C.V.M.Raju	Indian National Congress
69	Dendulur	None	M.Ramamohanarao	Indian National Congress
70	Eluru	None	M.Venkatanarayana	Indian National Congress
71	Gopalapuram	SC	Taneti Veera Raghavulu	Indian National Congress
72	Kovvur	None	K.B.Rayudu	Independent
73	Polavaram	ST	K.R.Reddy	Indian National Congress
74	Chintalapudi	None	G.Vishnumurthy	Indian National Congress
75	Jaggayyapet	None	R. B. R. S. Sresti	Indian National Congress
76	Nandigama	None	Adusumalli Suryanarayana Rao	Indian National Congress
77	Vijayawada East	None	Tenneti.V.S.C. Rao	Indian National Congress
78	Vijayawada West	None	M.P.Chitti	Indian National Congress
79	Kankipadu	None	A.Bhaskara Rao	Indian National Congress
80	Mylavaram	None	Chanamolu Venkata Rao	Indian National Congress
81	Tiruvur	SC	V.Kurmayya	Indian National Congress
82	Nuzvid	None	Meka Rangaiah Appa Rao	Indian National Congress
83	Gannavaram	None	V.Seetaramayya	Indian National Congress
84	Vuyyur	None	V. R. Kadiyala	Independent
85	Gudivada	None	M.Kamaladevi	Indian National Congress
86	Mudinepalli	None	K.Ramanatham	Independent
87	Kaikalur	None	C.Pandurangarao	Independent
88	Malleswara	None	Buragadda Niranjana Rao	Independent
89	Bandar	None	Pedasingu Lakshmana Rao	Indian National Congress
90	Nidumolu	SC	S.R. Kanumuri	Indian National Congress
91	Avanigadda	None	Yarlagadda Sivarama Prasad	Indian National Congress
92	Kuchinapudi	None	A.Bhagavathrao	Indian National Congress
93	Repalle	None	Y.Chennaiah	Indian National Congress
94	Vemur	None	Yadlapati Venkata Rao	Swatantra Party
95	Duggirala	None	A.Ramireddy	Independent
96	Tenali	None	Doddapaneni Indira	Indian National Congress
97	Ponnur	None	P. Ankineedu Prasada Rao	Indian National Congress
98	Bapata	None	Kona Prabhakara Rao	Indian National Congress
99	Chirala	None	Pragada Kotaiah	Indian National Congress
100	Parchur	None	Gade Venkata Reddy	Indian National Congress
101	Ongole	None	Cattamanchi Ramalinga Reddy	Indian National Congress
102	Santhanuthalapadu	None	V.C.K. Rao	Indian National Congress
103	Addanki	None	Dasari Prakasam	Indian National Congress
104	Chilakaluripeta	None	Kandimalla Butchaiah	Swatantra Party
105	Narasaraopet	None	Kasu Brahmananda Reddy	Indian National Congress
106	Prathipad	None	M.C.Nagaiah	Swatantra Party
107	Guntur I	None	S.Ankamma	Indian National Congress
108	Guntur Ii	None	C.Hanumaiah	Indian National Congress
109	Mangalagiri	None	T.Nageswarara Rao	Indian National Congress
110	Tadikonda	None	G.V.Rattaiah	Indian National Congress
111	Sattenapalli	None	Vavilala Gopalakrishnayya	Independent
112	Peddakurapadu	None	Ganapa Ramaswamy Reddy	Indian National Congress
113	Gurzala	None	Kotha Venkateswarlu	Indian National Congress
114	Macherla	None	Venna Linga Reddy	Indian National Congress
115	Vinukonda	None	Bhavanam Jayaprada	Indian National Congress
116	Darsi	None	Ravipati Mahananda	Swatantra Party
117	Podili	None	K. Narayana Swamy	Indian National Congress
118	Kanigiri	None	Puli Venkata Reddy	Indian National Congress
119	Udayagiri	None	Narasimha Dhanenkula	Swatantra Party
120	Kandukur	None	Nalamothu Chenchurama Naidu	Indian National Congress
121	Kondapi	None	Changanti Rosaiah Naidu	Indian National Congress
122	Kavali	None	G.Subbanaidu	Swatantra Party
123	Allur	None	B.Papi Reddy	Independent
124	Kovur	None	V.Venkureddy	Indian National Congress
125	Atmakur	None	Pellakure Ramachandra Reddy	Swatantra Party
126	Rapur	None	Anam C. S. Reddy	Indian National Congress
127	Nellore	None	M.R.Annadata	Bharatiya Jana Sangh
128	Sarvepalli	SC	Swarna Vemaiah	Communist Party of India
129	Gudur	None	V. Ramachandra Reddy	Independent
130	Sullurpet	SC	P.Venkatasubbaiah	Independent
131	Venkatagiri	SC	O.Venkatasubbaiah	Independent
132	Kalahasti	None	Bojjala.G.S.Reddy	Independent
133	Satyavedu	SC	K.Munaswamy	Swatantra Party
134	Nagari	None	Kilari Gopalu Naidu	Indian National Congress
135	Puttur	None	G.Sivaiah	Communist Party of India
136	Vepanjeri	SC	V.Munisamappa	Indian National Congress
137	Chittoor	None	D.Anianeyulu Naidu	Indian National Congress
138	Bangaripoliem	SC	M.Munaswamy	Indian National Congress
139	Kuppam	None	D.Venkatesam	Independent
140	Palamaner	SC	T.C.Rajan	Swatantra Party
141	Punganur	None	V.Ramaswami Reddy	Indian National Congress
142	Madanapalle	None	Alluri Narasinga Rao	Indian National Congress
143	Thamballapalle	None	T.N.Anasuyamma	Indian National Congress
144	Vayalpad	None	P.Thimma Reddy	Indian National Congress
145	Pileru	None	Mogal Sufulla Baig	Indian National Congress
146	Tirupathi	None	Agarala Eswara Reddi	Swatantra Party
147	Kodur	SC	N.Penchalaiah	Swatantra Party
148	Rajampet	None	Bandaru Ratnasabhapathi	Independent
149	Rayachoty	None	M.K. Reddy	Indian National Congress
150	Lakkireddipalli	None	Reddappagari Rajagopal Reddy	Indian National Congress
151	Cuddapah	None	Md. Rahamatulla	Indian National Congress
152	Badvel	None	B. Veera Reddy	Indian National Congress
153	Mydukur	None	Settipalli Nagi Reddy	Indian National Congress
154	Proddatur	None	Rajulapalle Ramasubba Reddy	Indian National Congress
155	Jammalamadugu	None	Kunda Ramiah	Independent
156	Kamalapuram	None	N.Pullareddy	Independent
157	Pulivendla	None	Penchikala Basi Reddy	Indian National Congress
158	Kadiri	None	K.V.Vema Reddy	Indian National Congress
159	Nallamada	None	K.Ramachandra Reddy	Indian National Congress
160	Gorantla	None	P. B. Reddy	Indian National Congress
161	Hindupur	None	A.Katnagante	Independent
162	Madakasira	SC	M.B.R.Rao	Swatantra Party
163	Penukonda	None	Narasi Reddy	Indian National Congress
164	Kalyandrug	SC	T.C.Mareppa	Independent
165	Rayadrug	None	J.Thippeswamy	Swatantra Party
166	Uravakonda	None	Gurram Chinna Venkanna	Indian National Congress
167	Gooty	None	R.Rudra Gowd	Independent
168	Singanamala	None	K.Chandrashekar	Indian National Congress
169	Anantapur	None	T. Nagi Reddy	Communist Party of India
170	Dharmavaram	None	P.Venkatesan	Swatantra Party
171	Tadpatri	None	C.Subbarayudu	Indian National Congress
172	Alur	SC	D.Govindadass	Swatantra Party
173	Adoni	None	T.G.L.Thimmaiah	Indian National Congress
174	Yemmiganur	None	P.O.Sathyanarayana Raju	Indian National Congress
175	Kodumur	SC	P. R. Rao	Swatantra Party
176	Kurnool	None	K. E. Madanna	Indian National Congress
177	Pathikonda	None	K.E. Reddy	Communist Party of India
178	Dhone	None	K.V.K.Murthy	Swatantra Party
179	Koilkuntla	None	B.V.Subba Reddy	Indian National Congress
180	Allagadda	None	Gangula Thimma Reddy	Independent
181	Panyam	None	V. Reddy	Independent
182	Nandikotkur	None	C.R. Reddy	Indian National Congress
183	Nandyal	None	S.B.N.Saheb	Indian National Congress
184	Giddalur	None	Pidathala Ranga Reddy	Independent
185	Markapur	None	C.Vengaiah	Independent
186	Yerragcndipalem	None	Poola Subbaiah	Communist Party of India
187	Achampet	SC	Puttapaga Mahendranath	Indian National Congress
188	Nagarkurnool	None	Vanga Narayan Goud	Independent
189	Kalwakurthi	None	G. Reddy	Independent
190	Shadnagar	SC	K.Naganna	Indian National Congress
191	Jadcherla	None	L.N. Reddy	Independent
192	Mahbubnagar	None	Ansari Ibrahim Ali	Indian National Congress
193	Wanaparthi	None	Rani Kumudini Devi	Indian National Congress
194	Alampur	None	T.Chandrasekhara Reddy	Indian National Congress
195	Kollapur	None	B.Narasimha Reddy	Independent
196	Gadwal	None	G. Reddy	Independent
197	Amarchinta	None	S. Bhopalb	Independent
198	Makthal	None	K. R. Rao	Indian National Congress
199	Kodangal	None	K.Achyutha Reddy	Indian National Congress
200	Tandur	None	Marri Chenna Reddy	Indian National Congress
201	Vicarabad	SC	A.Ramaswamy	Indian National Congress
202	Pargi	None	R. Reddy	Independent
203	Chevella	None	S. Didge	Independent
204	Ibrahimpatnam	None	M.N.Lakshminarsaiah	Indian National Congress
205	Musheerabad	None	T. Anjaiah	Indian National Congress
206	Gagan Mahal	None	V. Naik	Indian National Congress
207	Maharajganj	None	B.V. Pitti	Samyukta Socialist Party
208	Khairatabad	None	B.V.Gurumurthy	Indian National Congress
209	Asafnagar	None	M.M.Hashim	Indian National Congress
210	Sitarambagh	None	A.Hussain	Independent
211	Malakpet	None	Sarojini Pulla Reddy	Indian National Congress
212	Yakutpura	None	K.Nizamuddin	Independent
213	Charminar	None	Sultan Salahuddin Owaisi	Independent
214	Secunderabad	None	K.Satyanarayana	Indian National Congress
215	Secunderabad Cantonment	SC	V.R. Rao	Indian National Congress
216	Medchal	SC	Sumitra Devi	Indian National Congress
217	Siddipet	None	V.B. Raju	Indian National Congress
218	Dommat	None	M. B. Reddi	Independent
219	Gajwel	SC	G.Saidiah	Indian National Congress
220	Narsapur	None	C. J. Rao	Indian National Congress
221	Sangareddy	None	Narasimha Reddy	Independent
222	Andole	SC	C.Raja Narsimha	Indian National Congress
223	Zaheerabad	None	Mogaligundla Baga Reddy	Indian National Congress
224	Narayankhed	None	Shivarao Shetkar	Indian National Congress
225	Medak	None	R. Reddy	Indian National Congress
226	Ramayanpet	None	R.Rathnamma	Indian National Congress
227	Balkonda	None	G.r. Ram (uncontested)	Indian National Congress
228	Armoor	None	Tummala Rangareddy	Indian National Congress
229	Kamareddy	None	M. Reddy	Independent
230	Yellareddy	SC	J. E. Bai	Republican Party of India
231	Banswada	None	M.Sreenivasarao	Indian National Congress
232	Jukkal	None	V.Reddy	Independent
233	Bodhan	None	R.B.Rao	Independent
234	Nizamabad	None	K.V.Gangadhar	Independent
235	Mudhole	None	G.Gaddenna	Independent
236	Nirmal	None	P. Narsa Reddy	Indian National Congress
237	Boath	ST	S. A. Devshah	Indian National Congress
238	Adilabad	None	Kastala Ramakrishna	Communist Party of India
239	Asifabad	ST	K.Bheem Rao	Indian National Congress
240	Sirpur	None	G. Sanjeeva Reddy	Indian National Congress
241	Luxetipet	None	J.V.Narsingh Rao	Indian National Congress
242	Chinnur	SC	K.Rajamallu	Indian National Congress
243	Manthani	None	P. V. Narasimha Rao	Indian National Congress
244	Peddapalli	None	Jinna Malla Reddy	Independent
245	Myadaram	SC	G.Ramulu	Indian National Congress
246	Huzurabad	None	N. R. Polsani	Indian National Congress
247	Kamalapur	None	N.Pulla Reddy	Indian National Congress
248	Indurthy	None	B. L. Rao	Indian National Congress
249	Nusthulapur	SC	B. Rajaram	Indian National Congress
250	Karimnagar	None	J. Chokkarao	Indian National Congress
251	Buggaram	None	Y. M. Reddy	Indian National Congress
252	Jagtial	None	K.l.n.rao (uncontested)	Indian National Congress
253	Metpalli	None	C. S. Rao	Independent
254	Sircilla	None	Chennamaneni Rajeshwara Rao	Communist Party of India
255	Nerella	SC	G. Bhoopathi	Independent
256	Cheriyal	SC	B.Abraham	Communist Party of India
257	Jangaon	None	M.K.Ahmed	Indian National Congress
258	Chennur	None	Kodati Rajamallu	Indian National Congress
259	Dornakal	None	Nukala Ramachandra Reddy	Indian National Congress
260	Mahbuhabad	None	T.Satyanarayan	Communist Party of India
261	Narsampet	None	K.Sanjeev Reddy	Indian National Congress
262	Wardhannapet	None	T.Purushotham Rao	Independent
263	Ghanpur	None	T.L.Reddy	Independent
264	Warangal	None	T.S.Moorthy	Independent
265	Hasanparthy	SC	R.N.Ramaiah	Indian National Congress
266	Parkal	None	Chandupatla Janga Reddy	Bharatiya Jana Sangh
267	Mulug	None	Santosh Chakravarthy	Independent
268	Bhadrachalam	ST	K. K. Dora	Indian National Congress
269	Buragampahad	ST	R. Komaram	Indian National Congress
270	Palwamcha	None	P. Panuganti	Indian National Congress
271	Vemsoor	None	Jalagam Vengala Rao	Indian National Congress
272	Madhira	None	D.Venkaiah	Indian National Congress
273	Palair	SC	K.Santhaiah	Indian National Congress
274	Khammam	None	Md.Rajjab Ali	Communist Party of India
275	Yellandu	None	G.Satyanarayana Rao	Indian National Congress
276	Tungaturthi	None	B.Narayana Reddy	Communist Party of India
277	Suryapet	SC	Uppala Malsoor	Communist Party of India
278	Huzurnagar	None	A. R. V. D. Rao	Indian National Congress
279	Miryalguda	None	Tippana China Krishna Reddy	Indian National Congress
280	Chalakurthi	None	N.Ramulu	Independent
281	Nakrekal	None	Narra Raghava Reddy	Communist Party of India
282	Nalgonda	None	Chakilam Srinivasa Rao	Indian National Congress
283	Ramannapet	SC	Vaddepalli Kasiram	Indian National Congress
284	Alair	None	Anreddy Punna Reddy	Indian National Congress
285	Bhongir	None	Konda Laxman Bapuji	Indian National Congress
286	Mungode	None	Palvai Govardhan Reddy	Indian National Congress
287	Devarkonda	None	G. P. N. Reddy	Indian National Congress
