= Adilabad Lok Sabha constituency =

Lok Sabha Constituency in Telangana, India

Coordinates: 19.7°N 78.5°E

Adilabad TG-1
- Lok Sabha constituency
- Interactive Map Outlining Peddapalli Lok Sabha constituency

Constituency details
- Country: India
- Region: South India
- State: Telangana
- Assembly constituencies: Sirpur; Asifabad; Khanapur; Adilabad; Boath; Nirmal; Mudhole
- Established: 1952
- Total electors: 1,386,233
- Reservation: ST

Member of Parliament
- 18th Lok Sabha
- Incumbent Godam Nagesh
- Party: Bharatiya Janata Party
- Elected year: 2024

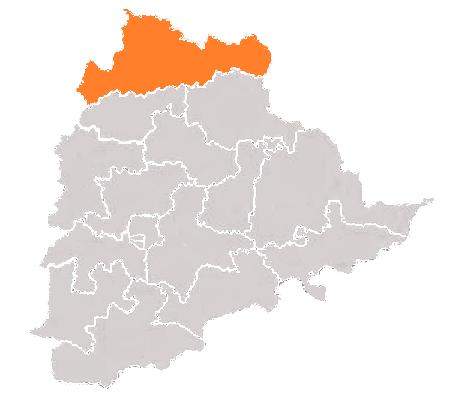

Adilabad Lok Sabha constituency is one of the 17 Lok Sabha (Lower house of the Parliament) constituencies in the state of Telangana, India. This constituency is reserved for the candidates belonging to the Scheduled Tribes.

== Assembly segments ==
This constituency comprises the following Vidhan Sabha (legislative assembly) segments:

#	Name	District	Member	Party	Leading (in 2024)
1	Sirpur	K B Asifabad	Palvai Harish Babu	BJP	BJP
5	Asifabad (ST)	K B Asifabad	Kova Laxmi	BRS	INC
6	Khanapur (ST)	Nirmal	Vedma Bhojju	INC	BJP
7	Adilabad	Adilabad	Payal Shankar	BJP	BJP
8	Boath (ST)	Adilabad	Anil Jadhav	BRS	BJP
9	Nirmal	Nirmal	Alleti Maheshwar Reddy	BJP	BJP
10	Mudhole	Nirmal	Rama Rao Pawar	BJP	BJP

== Members of Parliament ==
Year	Member	Party
Hyderabad State
1952	C. Madhava Reddy	Socialist Party
Andhra Pradesh
1957	K. Ashanna	Indian National Congress
1962	G. Narayan Reddy	Indian National Congress
1967	Poddutoori Ganga Reddy	Indian National Congress
1971	Poddutoori Ganga Reddy	Indian National Congress
1977	G. Narsimha Reddy	Indian National Congress
1980	G. Narsimha Reddy	Indian National Congress
1984	C. Madhava Reddy	Telugu Desam Party
1989	P. Narsa Reddy	Indian National Congress
1991	Allola Indrakaran Reddy	Telugu Desam Party
1996	Samudrala Venugopal Chary	Telugu Desam Party
1998	Samudrala Venugopal Chary	Telugu Desam Party
1999	Samudrala Venugopal Chary	Telugu Desam Party
2004	T. Madhusudan Reddy	Bharat Rashtra Samithi
2008^	Allola Indrakaran Reddy	Indian National Congress
2009	Ramesh Rathod	Telugu Desam Party
Telangana
2014	Godam Nagesh	Bharat Rashtra Samithi
2019	Bapu Rao Soyam	Bharatiya Janata Party
2024	Godam Nagesh	Bharatiya Janata Party

^ by-poll

== Election results ==
=== 2024 ===
2024 Indian general elections: Adilabad
Party	Candidate	Votes	%	±%
BJP	Godam Nagesh	568,168	45.98	▲10.5
INC	Atram Suguna	477,516	38.65	▲9.11
BRS	Atram Sakku	137,300	11.11	▼18.86
NOTA	None of the above	11,762	0.95	▼0.28
Majority		90,652	7.34	▲1.83
Turnout		1,235,597	74.03	▲2.61
BJP hold		Swing		

=== 2019 ===
2019 Indian general elections: Adilabad
Party	Candidate	Votes	%	±%
BJP	Bapu Rao Soyam	377,374	35.48	New
BRS	Godam Nagesh	3,18,814	29.97	−10.85
INC	Ramesh Rathod	3,14,238	29.54	+4.95
NOTA	None of the above	13,036	1.23	
Majority		58,560	5.51	
Turnout		10,63,977	71.42	
BJP gain from BRS		Swing		

=== 2014 ===
2014 Indian general elections: Adilabad
Party	Candidate	Votes	%	±%
BRS	Godam Nagesh	430,847	40.82	N/A
INC	Dr. Naresh Jadhav	2,59,557	24.59	−4.96
TDP	Ramesh Rathod	1,84,198	17.45	−25.50
BSP	Rathod Sadashiv Naik	94,420	8.94	
IND.	Nethawath Ramdas	41,032	3.89	
NOTA	None of the above	17,084	1.62	
Majority		1,71,290	16.38	
Turnout		10,55,593	76.15	
BRS gain from TDP		Swing		

=== 2009 ===
General Election, 2009: Adilabad
Party	Candidate	Votes	%	±%
TDP	Ramesh Rathod	372,268	43.11	▲8.62
INC	Kotnak Ramesh	2,57,181	29.78	▼11.94
PRP	Mesram Nago Rao	1,12,930	13.08	
BJP	Ade Tukaram	57,931	6.71	
BSP	Rathod Sadashiv Naik	16,471	1.91	
Independent	Banka Sahadevu	16,441	1.90	
Independent	Ganta Pentanna	13,378	1.55	
Independent	Nethavat Ramdas	9,157	1.06	
Independent	Athram Laxman Rao	7,824	0.91	
Majority		115,087	13.30	▲6.07
Turnout		8,63,581	76.32	+3.90
TDP gain from INC		Swing	-0.58	

=== Bye-election, 2008 ===
Bye-election, 2008: Adilabad
Party	Candidate	Votes	%	±%
INC	Allola Indrakaran Reddy	323,109	41.72	New
TDP	Dr. Samudrala Venugopal Chary	267,139	34.49	▼10.55
TRS	T. Madhusudan Reddy	144,455	18.65	▼31.32
Independent	Vodnam Narsaiah	13,411	1.73	
Independent	Dongre Prabhakar	9,185	1.18	
Independent	Bolumalla Anjaiah	6,980	0.90	
Independent	Loka Praveen Reddy	6,010	0.77	
Independent	Dr. K. Padmarajan	4,118	0.53	
Majority		55,970	7.23	▲2.30
Turnout		774,407	-	▼6.85
INC gain from BRS		Swing	+11.94	

=== 2004 ===
General Election, 2004: Adilabad
Party	Candidate	Votes	%	±%
BRS	Madhusudhan Reddy Takkala	415,429	49.97	▲49.97
TDP	Dr. Samudrala Venugopal Chary	374,455	45.04	▼7.45
Peoples Republican Party	Mothe Barik Rao	23,282	2.80	▲0.04
Independent	Nainala Goverdhan	18,171	2.19	
Majority		40,974	4.93	▲57.42
Turnout		831,337	72.91	▲2.57
BRS gain from TDP		Swing	▲49.97	

=== 1999 ===
General Election, 1999: Adilabad
Party	Candidate	Votes	%	±%
TDP	Dr. Samudrala Venugopal Chary	390,308	52.49	▲13.00
INC	Mohd. Sultan Ahmed	280,585	37.73	▲2.79
CPI	C. Shanker Rao	35,113	4.72	New
Independent	K.V. Narayan Rao	22,141	2.98	N/A
RPI(A)	C.H. Dayanand	10,466	1.41	New
ATDP	Sumathi Reddy	3,859	0.52	New
Independent	MD. Chand Pasha	1,130	0.15	N/A
Majority		110,023	14.79	▲10.24
Turnout		743,602	70.34	
TDP hold		Swing	+52.49	

=== 1998 ===
1998 Indian general election: Adilabad
Party	Candidate	Votes	%	±%
TDP	Dr. S. Venugopala Chary	291,168	39.49	
INC	Allola Indrakaran Reddy	2,57,634	34.94	
BJP	Vishnu Prakash Bajaj	1,79,134	24.29	
Independent	Addi Bhoja Reddy	4,145	0.56	
Independent	Jadi Narsaiah	3,800	0.52	
Independent	Netavath Ramdas	878	0.12	
Independent	Sooram Gangareddy	616	0.08	
Majority		33,534	4.55	
Turnout		7,52,835	69.79	
TDP hold		Swing		

=== 1996 ===
1996 Indian general election: Adilabad
Party	Candidate	Votes	%	±%
TDP	S. Venugopala Chary	286,477	43.05	
INC	Allola Indrakaran Reddy	2,49,117	37.44	
BJP	Koripelli Narayan Reddy	61,025	9.17	
NTRTDP(LP)	Gona Venkat Amshuman Rao	43,397	6.52	
Others	4 Other Party Candidates	7,046	1.07%	
Independent	8 Independent Candidates	18,396	2.76	
Majority		37,360	5.61	
Turnout				
TDP hold		Swing		

=== 1991 ===
1991 Indian general election: Adilabad
Party	Candidate	Votes	%	±%
TDP	Allola Indrakaran Reddy	208,792	40.96	
INC	P. Narasa Reddy	1,68,816	33.12	
BJP	Thumala Narayana Reddy	1,06,751	20.94	
Independent	Durgam Shyam Rao	9,583	1.88	
Independent	Bairimala Mogilaiah	7,354	1.44	
Independent	Panna Lal	3,971	0.78	
Independent	Gogarla Ramchander	3,233	0.63	
Independent	Pamula Bheemaiah	687	0.13	
Independent	Mohd. Shafiuddin	549	0.11	
Majority		39,976	7.84	
Turnout		5,26,729	59.18	
Swing to TDP from INC		Swing		

=== 1989 ===
1989 Indian general election: Adilabad
Party	Candidate	Votes	%	±%
INC	P. Narasa Reddy	290,072	52.52	
TDP	C. Madhava Reddy	2,45,707	44.49	
Independent	Lalji Bhai	8,310	1.50	
Independent	Thakoor Mukteshwar Singh	6,274	1.14	
Independent	Ghanashamlal Gupta	1,901	0.34	
Majority		44,365	8.03	
Turnout		5,80,382	65.34	
Swing to INC from TDP		Swing		

=== 1984 ===
1984 Indian general election: Adilabad
Party	Candidate	Votes	%	±%
TDP	C. Madhav Reddy	238,440	55.66	
INC	C. Narisimha Reddy	1,83,882	42.93	
Independent	M. A. Sajid	3,221	0.75	
Independent	Thakur Mukteshwar Simha	2,817	0.66	
Majority		54,558	12.73	
Turnout		4,44,854	63.52	
Swing to TDP from INC		Swing		

=== 1980 ===
1980 Indian general election: Adilabad
Party	Candidate	Votes	%	±%
INC(I)	G. Narasimha Reddy	234,300	70.59	
JP	P. Rajeshwar Rao	52,345	15.77	
JP(S)	A. Padmanabha Reddy	22,723	6.85	
Independent	Thakar Muktheswar Singh	10,518	3.17	
Independent	Jangapalli Lingaiah	6,126	1.85	
Independent	Amanath Ali	5,911	1.78	
Majority		1,81,955	54.82	
Turnout		3,48,058	55.72	
INC(I) hold		Swing		

=== 1977 ===
1977 Indian general election: Adilabad
Party	Candidate	Votes	%	±%
INC	G. Narsimha Reddy	167,410	57.47	
JP	Gopidi Ganga Reddy	96,244	33.04	
Independent	Thakur Mukteshwar Singh	27,652	9.49	
Majority		71,166	24.43	
Turnout		3,10,466	56.64	
INC hold		Swing		

=== 1971 ===
1971 Indian general election: Adilabad
Party	Candidate	Votes	%	±%
INC	P. Ganga Reddy	151,482	52.60	
TPS	K. V. Kishan Rao	1,36,532	47.40	
Majority		14,950	5.20	
Turnout		3,03,280	58.90	
INC hold		Swing		

=== 1967 ===
1967 Indian general election: Adilabad
Party	Candidate	Votes	%	±%
INC	P. G. Reddy	160,494	59.52	
CPI	D. S. Rao	86,244	31.98	
Independent	D. Rao	22,928	8.50	
Majority		74,250	27.54	
Turnout		2,84,595	61.11	
INC hold		Swing		

=== 1962 ===
1962 Indian general election: Adilabad
Party	Candidate	Votes	%	±%
INC	G. Narayan Reddy	129,068	61.45	
Independent	V. G. Dora Sami	39,983	19.04	
Independent	Mohd. Pakruddin	31,494	14.99	
Independent	Ram Rao Deshpande	9,487	4.52	
Majority		89,085	42.41	
Turnout		2,20,383	54.51	
INC hold		Swing		

=== 1957 ===
1957 Indian general election: Adilabad
Party	Candidate	Votes	%	±%
INC	K. Ashanna	91,287	51.67	
PSP	C. Madhav Reddy	85,375	48.33	
Majority		5,912	3.34	
Turnout		1,76,662	48.28	
Swing to INC from Socialist		Swing		

=== 1951 ===
1951 Indian general election: Adilabad
Party	Candidate	Votes	%	±%
Socialist	C. Madhav Reddy	90,995	57.99	
INC	J. V. Narsingrao	65,912	42.01	
Majority		25,083	15.98	
Turnout		1,56,907	44.70	
Socialist win (new seat)				

== Notes ==
- Number (#) in the Assembly Segments table is the "Assembly Segment" number, not a serial number.

== See also ==
- Adilabad district
- List of constituencies of the Lok Sabha
