= C. Madhava Reddy =

Indian politician (1924–1990)

Member of Parliament, 8th Lok Sabha
- In office December 1984 – November 1989
- Preceded by: G. Narsimha Reddy
- Succeeded by: P. Narsa Reddy
- Constituency: Adilabad

MLA, 03rd Assembly
- In office March 1962 – February 1967
- Preceded by: n/a
- Succeeded by: S. A. Devshah
- Constituency: Boath

Member of Parliament, 1st Lok Sabha
- In office April 1952 – April 1957
- Preceded by: None
- Succeeded by: K. Ashanna
- Constituency: Adilabad

Personal details
- Born: 22 August 1924 village Arepelli, Chinnoor, Adilabad (Andhra Pradesh)
- Died: 14 March 1990 (aged 65) Madras, India
- Citizenship: India
- Party: Telugu Desam Party
- Other political affiliations: Socialist Party (India); Praja Socialist Party; Indian National Congress; Janata Party
- Spouse(s): Mrs.Suguna, Mrs. Lakshmi
- Children: Prakash, Ravi, Kalpana, Himavanth
- Parent: Mr. Narasimha Reddy (father)
- Education: Osmania University
- Profession: Agriculturist & Politician
- Committees: Member of several committees.

C. Madhava Reddy (22 August 1924 – 14 March 1990) was an Indian politician who was a Member of Parliament, serving in the 1st and 8th Lok Sabhas. Reddy represented the Adilabad constituency of Andhra Pradesh and is a member of the Telugu Desam Party political party.

== Early life and education ==
C. Madhava Reddy was born in the village Arepelli, Chinnoor, Adilabad in the state of Andhra Pradesh. He attended the Osmania University and attained M.A degree. By profession, Reddy is an Agriculturist.

== Political career ==
C. Madhava Reddy was the first elected M.P from Adilabad constituency. He also was a member of Andhra Pradesh Legislative Assembly in 1962. Reddy got re-elected as M.P in the 8th Lok Sabha of India.

During his entire political career, Reddy associated with several political parties; viz Socialist Party, Praja Socialist Party, Indian National Congress, Janata Party and is currently a member of the Telugu Desam Party.

== Death ==
Reddy died from complications of by-pass surgery in Madras, on 14 March 1990, at the age of 65.

== Posts Held ==
#	From	To	Position	Comments
01	1952	1957	Member, 01st Lok Sabha	As Socialist Party member
02	1962	1967	Member, 03rd Assembly	
03	1984	1989	Member, 08th Lok Sabha	As TDP member

== See also ==
- Andhra Pradesh Legislative Assembly
- Parliament of India
- Politics of India
