= G. Narayan Reddy =

Indian politician

Member of Parliament, 3rd Lok Sabha
- In office Apr 1962 – Mar 1967
- Preceded by: K. Ashanna
- Succeeded by: Poddutoori Ganga Reddy
- Constituency: Adilabad

Personal details
- Born: c. 1926 amberpet
- Died: 16 December 1998 (aged 72)
- Citizenship: India
- Party: Congress
- Profession: Politician

G. Narayan Reddy (c. 1926 – 16 December 1998) was an Indian politician and Member of Parliament of India. He was a member of the 3rd Lok Sabha and represented the Adilabad constituency of Telangana. Reddy was a member of the Congress political party. He was murdered on 16 December 1998 at the age of 72.

== Political career ==
Reddy was the third elected M.P from Adilabad constituency. This was his only term in the Lok Sabha of India.

== Posts Held ==
#	From	To	Position	Comments
01	1962	1967	Member, 03rd Lok Sabha	

== See also ==
- Andhra Pradesh Legislative Assembly
- Lok Sabha
- Parliament of India
- Politics of India
