= G. Narsimha Reddy =

Member of Parliament, 7th Lok Sabha
- In office Jan 1980 – Dec 1984
- Preceded by: G. Narsimha Reddy
- Succeeded by: C. Madhava Reddy
- Constituency: Adilabad

Member of Parliament, 6th Lok Sabha
- In office Mar 1977 – Aug 1979
- Preceded by: Poddutoori Ganga Reddy
- Succeeded by: G. Narsimha Reddy
- Constituency: Adilabad

Personal details
- Born: 14 April 1936 (age 90) village Jakranpally, Nizamabad, (Andhra Pradesh)
- Citizenship: India
- Party: Congress (I)
- Relatives: Mr. G. Ganga Reddy (brother)
- Education: Nowrosjee Wadia College & Nizam College
- Profession: Agriculturist, Businessman & Politician

G. Narsimha Reddy is an Indian politician and was Member of Parliament of India. He was a member of the 6th and 7th Lok Sabhas. Reddy represented the Adilabad constituency of Andhra Pradesh and is a member of the Congress (I) political party.

== Early life and education ==
G. Narsimha Reddy was born in the village Jakranpally, Nizamabad in the state of Andhra Pradesh. He attended the Osmania University and attained B.A degree. By profession, Reddy is an Agriculturist.

== Political career ==
G. Narsimha Reddy was M.P from Adilabad constituency for two straight terms. He was also the Chairman of Zila Parishad in Adilabad district.

== Posts held ==
#	From	To	Position	Comments
01	1977	1979	Member, 06th Lok Sabha	Party was called Congress
02	1980	1984	Member, 07th Lok Sabha	Party renamed to Congress (I)

== See also ==
- Parliament of India
- Politics of India
- Zila Parishad
