= Rani Kumudini Devi =

Indian politician and social worker

- Devi in 1963

Mayor of Hyderabad
- In office 1963–1964
- Preceded by: Ram Moorthy Naidu
- Succeeded by: Sarojini Pulla Reddy

Member of the Legislative Assembly United Andhra Pradesh
- In office 1962–1972
- Preceded by: Padmanabha Reddy
- Succeeded by: Ayyappa
- Constituency: Wanaparthy

Personal details
- Born: 23 January 1911 Wadepally, Hyderabad State, British India
- Died: 6 August 2009 (aged 98) Hyderabad, Andhra Pradesh, India
- Party: Indian National Congress
- Children: 4

Rani Kumudini Devi (23 January 1911 – 6 August 2009) was an Indian politician and social worker who served as the Mayor of Hyderabad from 1963 to 1964. A member of the Indian National Congress, she was the first female mayor of Hyderabad. She also served as a Member of the Andhra Pradesh Legislative Assembly representing Wanaparthy from 1962 to 1972.

== Early life ==
Rani Kumudini Devi was born on 23 January 1911 in Wadepally of Warangal district in present-day Telangana. Her father, Pingle Venaktaramana Reddy, was a nobleman who would later become the Deputy Prime Minister of Hyderabad State.

As a child, she moved to Hyderabad along with her family, and completed her early education at St. George's Grammar School. Her parents encouraged Devi to take part in activities generally dominated by boys, such as riding bicycles and horses, and playing sports.

== Career ==
She established the Sivananda Rehabilitation Home, a treatment centre for leprosy patients in 1958.

=== Mayor of Hyderabad ===
She was elected the Mayor of Hyderabad in 1962. The same year, floods struck Hyderabad as the Musi river overflowed, and Devi was in charge of the civic response. She appealed to Prime Minister Jawaharlal Nehru for funds, who released ₹20,000. She also prepared a flood-prevention plan for the coming years.

=== Later career ===
In 1967, she was re-elected as the Member of the Legislative Assembly (MLA) for Wanaparthy. During the Bangladesh Liberation War, she assisted in the settlement of Bengali refugees who were camped around the Nagarjuna Sagar.

She was active well into her nineties, raising funds for the Sivananda Rehabilitation Home. In 2002, she established the Ramdev Rao Hospital, an 80-bed general hospital named after her husband. She died on 6 August 2009 at the age of 98.

== Personal life ==
She was married to J. Rajaramdev Rao of Wanaparthy in 1928, and had four children. Devi was friends with Dürrüşehvar Sultan, and the two women rode horses and played tennis together.
