= Samudrala Venugopal Chary =

Indian politician

Dr. Samudrala Venugopal Chary
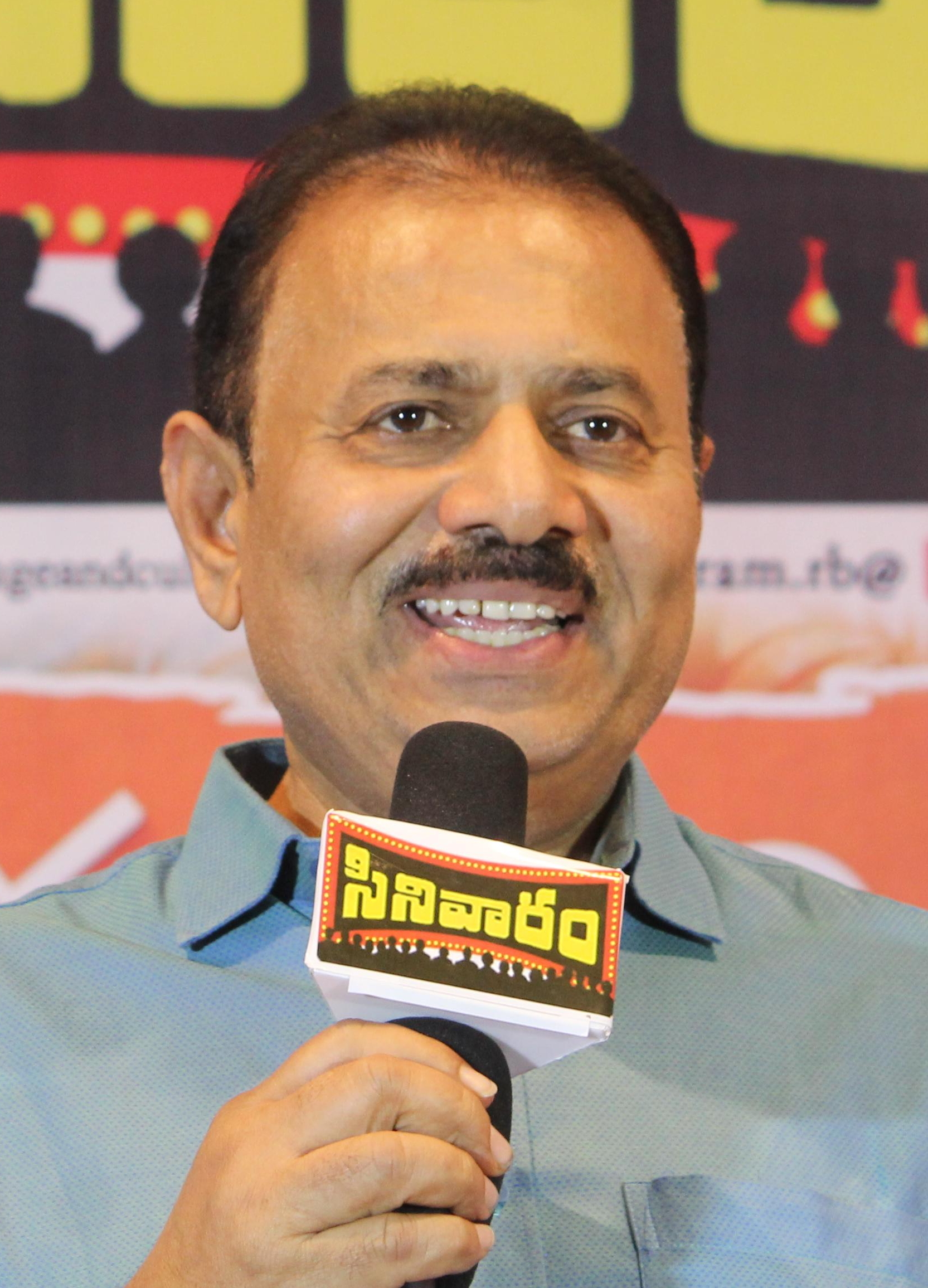
- Samudrala Venugopal Chary in Cinivaram, Ravindra Bharathi, Hyderabad

Member of Parliament, Lok Sabha
- In office 9 May 1996 – 6 February 2004
- Constituency: Adilabad

Member of Andhra Pradesh Legislative Assembly
- In office 1985 – 9 May 1996
- Constituency: Nirmal

Personal details
- Born: 10 May 1959 (age 67) Nirmal, Adilabad district (Andhra Pradesh)
- Citizenship: India
- Party: Indian National Congress
- Other political affiliations: Telangana Rashtra Samithi; Telugu Desam Party
- Spouse: Mrs. S. Revathi
- Children: 1 son & 1 daughter.
- Parent(s): Mr. S. Laxmana Chary (father) & Mrs. Venkata Ratnamma (mother)
- Education: Osmania University & Government Homoeo Medical College (Hyderabad)
- Profession: Medical Practitioner & Politician
- Committees: Member of several committees

Samudrala Venugopal Chary is an Indian politician and was Member of Parliament of India for three consecutive terms. He was a member of the 11th, 12th and the 13th Lok Sabhas. Chary was also a member of the Andhra Pradesh Legislative Assembly. Chary represented the Adilabad constituency of Andhra Pradesh and is a member of the Indian National Congress and formerly of Bharat Rashtra Samithi.

Venugopal Chary Joined In Congress on 16 April 2024 in the presence of Chief Minister Revanth Reddy.

== Early life and education ==
Samudrala Venugopal Chary was born in Nirmal, Adilabad district in the state of Andhra Pradesh. He attended the Osmania University & Government Homoeo Medical College in the city of Hyderabad. He attained M.A (sociology) and D.H.M.S degrees. Chary is a Medical Practitioner by profession.

== Political career ==
Samudrala Venugopal Chary has been in active politics since the early 1980s. Prior to becoming a M.P he was also MLA (three straight terms) from Nirmal. Chary was a member of several committees and was also a Minister.

== Posts Held ==
#	From	To	Position	Comments
01	1985	1989	Member, 08th Assembly	
02	1987	1988	Member, Public Accounts Committee	
03	1989	1994	Member, 09th Assembly	
04	1989	1990	Member, Committee on Subordinate Legislation	
05	1992	1993	Member, Public Undertakings Committee	
06	1994	1996	Member, 10th Assembly	Resigned in 96 for Lok Sabha elections.
07	1995	1996	Cabinet Minister, Information and Public Relations and Tourism, Andhra Pradesh	
08	1996	1997	Member, 11th Lok Sabha	
09	1996	1997	Union Minister of State, Power and Non-Conventional Energy	
10	1996	1997	Union Minister of State, Agriculture	
11	1998	1999	Member, 12th Lok Sabha	
12	1998	1998	Union Minister of State, Agriculture	
13	1998	1999	Deputy Chairman, Committee on Official Language	
14	1998	1999	Member, Rules Committee	
15	1998	1999	Member, Committee on Public Undertakings	
16	1998	1999	Member, Committee on Finance	
17	1998	1999	Member, Committee on Members of Parliament Local Area Development Scheme	
18	1998	1999	Member, Consultative Committee, Ministry of Power	
19	1999	2004	Member, 13th Lok Sabha	
20	1999	2000	Chairman, Committee on Government Assurances	
21	1999	2004	Member, Committee on Estimates	
22	1999	2004	Member, Committee on Home Affairs	
23	1999	2004	Member, General Purposes Committee	
24	2009	2014	Member, Andhra Pradesh Legislature	
25	29 December 2022	7 December 2023	Chairman, Telangana State Irrigation Development Corporation Limited	

== See also ==
- 11th, 12th and 13th Lok Sabha
- Adilabad (Lok Sabha constituency)
- Andhra Pradesh Legislative Assembly
- Government of India
- Lok Sabha
- Nirmal (Assembly constituency)
- Parliament of India
- Politics of India
- Telugu Desam Party
