= Dilawarpur =

Dilawarpur దిలావర్‌పూర్
- Mandal headquarters
- Interactive map of Dilawarpur
- Coordinates: 19°05′30″N 78°13′40″E
- Elevation: 358 m (1,175 ft)

Population (2011)
  - Total: 6,814
- Time zone: UTC+05:30 (IST)
- PIN: 504306
- STD code: 08734
- Vehicle registration: TG-18
- Local Government Body: Dilawarpur Gram Panchayat
- LGD Code: 195119

Dilawarpur is a village, a Gram Panchayat, and the administrative headquarters of the Dilawarpur mandal in the Nirmal district of the Indian state of Telangana. Located approximately 14 kilometres (8.7 mi) northwest of the district headquarters at Nirmal, the village serves as a major agricultural and rural administrative center for northern Telangana.

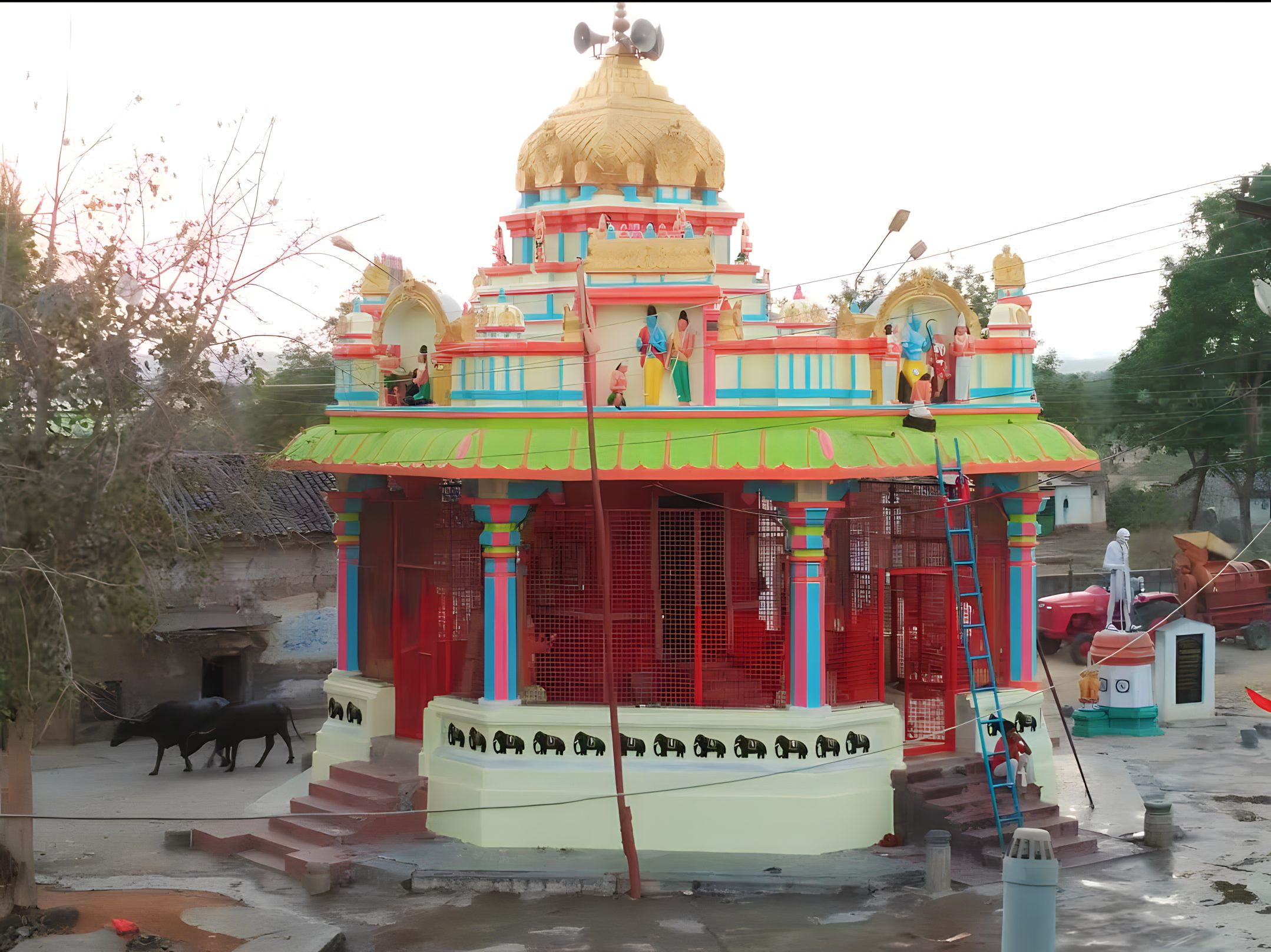

== Demographics ==
As per the official 2011 Census of India, Dilawarpur village has a total population of 6,814 individuals distributed across 1,640 households. The average sex ratio of the village is 1,129 females per 1,000 males, which is notably higher than regional averages. The child population (age 0–6) stands at 765.

The literacy rate of Dilawarpur village is 52.70%. Male literacy stands at 64.91%, while female literacy is 41.99%. In terms of social composition, Scheduled Castes constitute 10.63% of the total settlement population, while Scheduled Tribes make up 9.98%.

== Administration ==
As a mandal headquarters, Dilawarpur operates as a local governance node under the Nirmal revenue division. The Dilawarpur Gram Panchayat (LGD Code: 57032) manages executive village affairs, while the Mandal Parishad coordinates inter-village infrastructure across its constituent revenue villages.

== Culture and festivals ==
The socio-cultural fabric of Dilawarpur is defined by the worship of local protective deities and rural agrarian traditions.

=== Adelli Maha Pochamma Ganga Neella Jatara ===
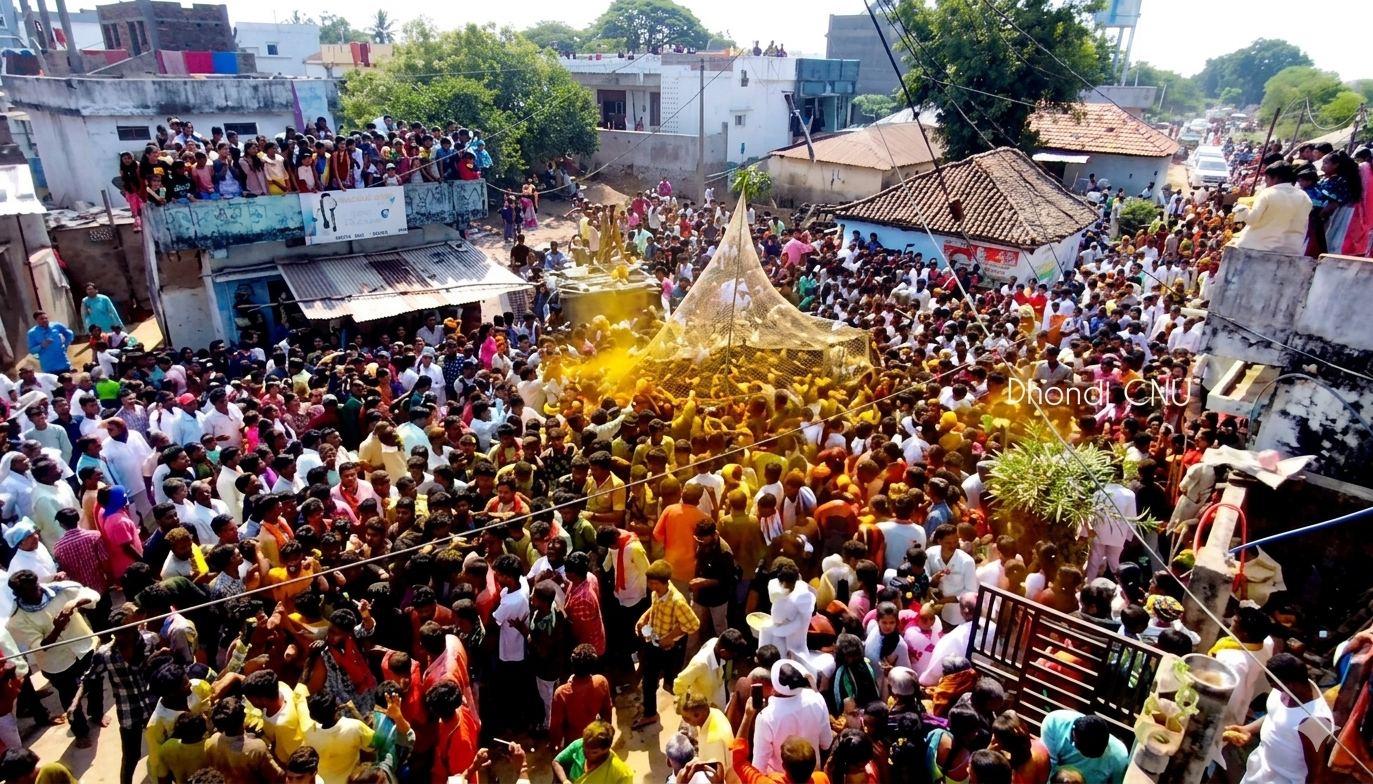
శ్రీ శ్రీ శ్రీ ఆడెల్లి మహా పోచమ్మ తల్లి గంగా నీళ్ల జాతర

The Adelli Maha Pochamma Ganga Neella Jatara is a major tribal and folk celebration held annually during the Dasara (Navaratri) season. It centers around the historical Sri Maha Pochamma Temple in the adjacent Adelli village, attracting devotees from neighboring districts and the border corridors of Maharashtra. Hereditary temple priests and barefoot devotees lead an exhaustive 20 kilometres (12 mi) religious procession bearing the sacred ornaments of Goddess Pochamma from Adelli toward the Sangvi Ghat, situated near Sangvi village within the Dilawarpur mandal. Following an overnight vigil, devotees execute the Ganga Neella ritual, bathing the sacred ornaments in the Godavari River.

=== Renuka Yellamma Temple ===
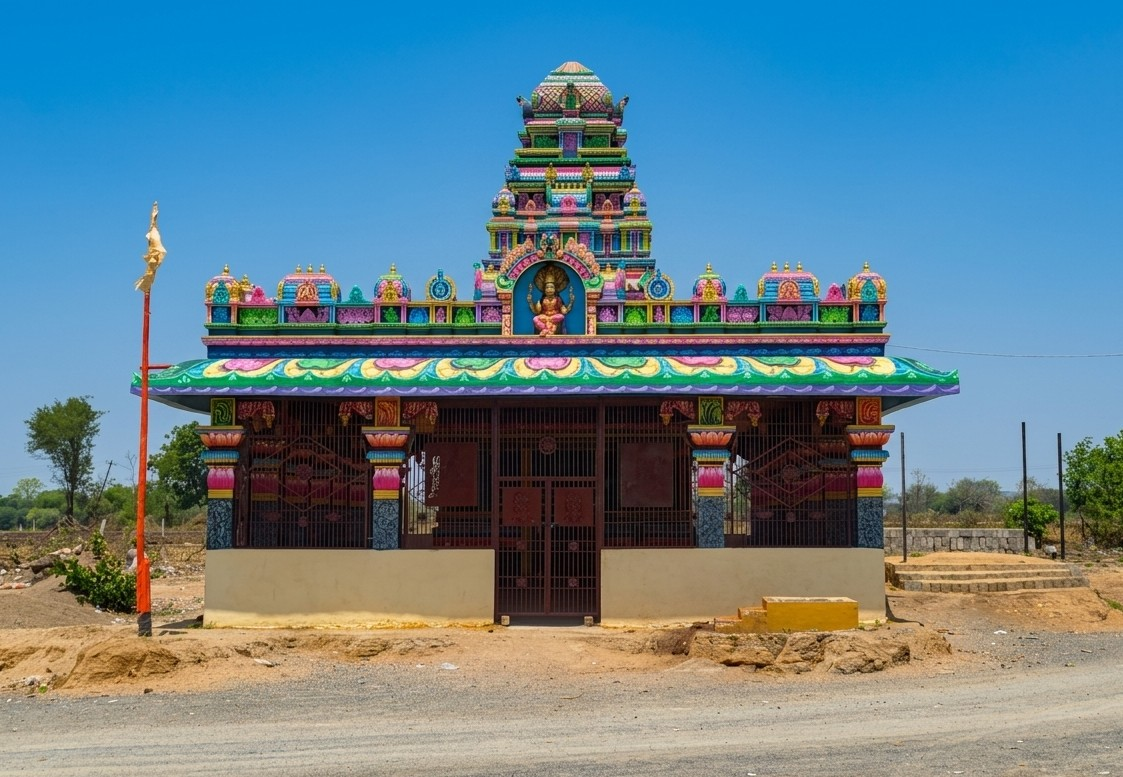
శ్రీ శ్రీ శ్రీ రేణుక ఎల్లమ్మ ఆలయం

The Renuka Yellamma Temple is another prominent regional shrine situated in Dilawarpur. Dedicated to Goddess Yellamma—venerated locally as a manifestation of Renuka and Shakti—the shrine draws peak crowds during the spring Navaratri and Chaitra Purnima festivals.

== Surrounding attractions ==
Dilawarpur's strategic location provides transit access to several major tourist and ecological assets managed by the state administration:

- Kadam Project (Kadem Dam): A major structural irrigation project engineered across the Kadem River, a tributary of the Godavari. It acts as an environmental eco-tourism hub featuring scenic hillocks and greenery.
- Gnana Saraswati Temple (Basar): Positioned on the banks of the Godavari River, it is one of the only two famous historical shrines dedicated to the Hindu Goddess of knowledge, Saraswati, in the Indian subcontinent. It serves as a major node for the Akshara Abyasam initiation rituals for young children.
