= Rathod Bapu Rao =

Indian politician and legislator

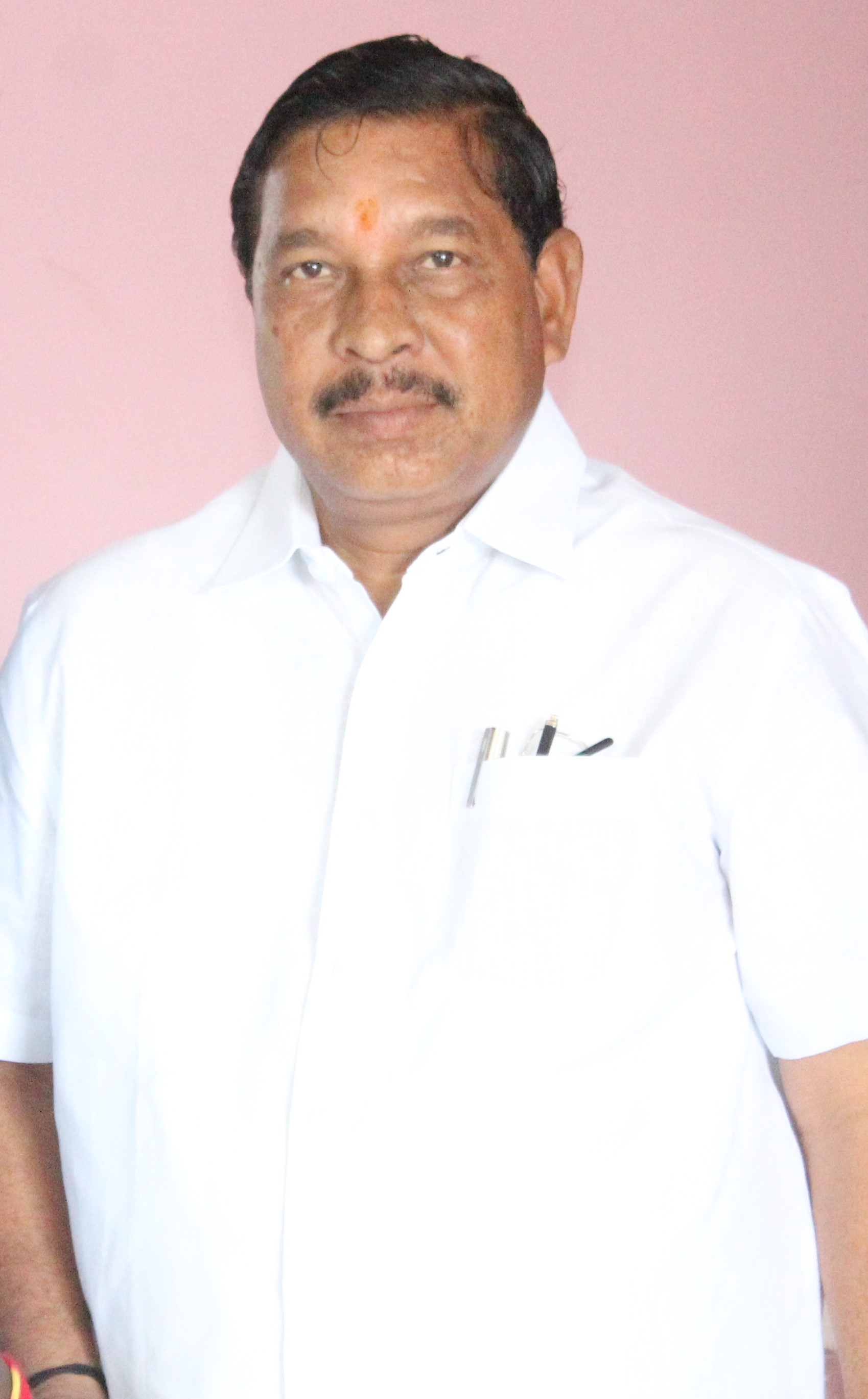

Member of the Telangana Legislative Assembly
- In office 2 June 2014 – 3 December 2023
- Preceded by: G. Nagesh
- Succeeded by: Anil Jadhav
- Constituency: Boath

Personal details
- Born: 1962 (age 63–64) Adilabad, India
- Party: Telangana Rashtra Sena
- Other political affiliations: Indian National Congress (2024–2026 December 19); Bhartiya Janata Party (2023–2024); Bharat Rashtra Samithi

Rathod Bapu Rao (born 12 March 1962) is an Indian politician and a legislator of Telangana Legislative Assembly. He won as MLA from Boath assembly constituency on Bharat Rashtra Samithi ticket.

== Early life ==
He was born in Adilabad, Telangana to Narayana. He did his M.A. from Osmania University.

== Career ==
Rathod Bapu Rao won as MLA in 2014 and 2018 from Boath assembly constituency. He joined the BJP after the BRS denied him the ticket to contest the 2023 polls. But he quit the party within two months and joined the Congress.

Rathod Bapu Rao joined Telangana Jagruthi in the presence of its founder Kalvakuntla Kavitha on 19 April 2026.

== Personal life ==
He is married to R. Vandhana.
