= Mamda mandal =

Mamda
- Mandal
- Location in telangana, India Mamda (India)
- Coordinates: 19.1000°N 78.5333°E
- Country: India
- State: Telangana
- District: Nirmal

Area
  - Total: 4.5 km^{2} (1.7 sq mi)
- Elevation: 348 m (1,142 ft)

Population
  - Total: 6,000
  - Density: 1,300/km^{2} (3,500/sq mi)

Languages
  - Official: Telugu
- Time zone: UTC+5:30 (IST)
- Postal code: 504310
- Vehicle registration: TS-18
- Website: telangana.gov.in

Mamda is a Mandal in Nirmal district in the state of Telangana in India. It is situated on the banks of the village lake and is located approximately 19 km from Nirmal town. The cool climate is influenced by nearby forested mountains. The area has a Deccan Grameena Bank branch. Mamda is also home to a Hanuman temple and the Sri Venkateshvara temple, whose deity was inaugurated by then-Minister Allola Indrakaran Reddy.

== Demographics ==
According to Indian census, 2001, the demographic details of Mamda mandal is as follows:

- Total Population: 28,921 in 6,185 Households.
- Male Population: 14,059 and Female Population: 14,862
- Children Under 6-years of age: 4,448 (Boys - 2,251 and Girls - 2,197)
- Total Literates: 9,655

== Villages ==
The villages in Mamda mandal include: Ananthpet, Rayadhari, Dimmadurthy, Gayadpalle, Kamalkot, Kishanraopet, Koratikal, Mamda, Naldurthy, New Sangvi, Parimandal, Ponkal, Potharam and Tandra.
