= K. Ashanna =

Indian politician

Member of Parliament, 2nd Lok Sabha
- In office Apr 1957 – Mar 1962
- Preceded by: C. Madhava Reddy
- Succeeded by: G. Narayan Reddy
- Constituency: Adilabad

Personal details
- Born: 11 May 1923 Adilabad (Andhra Pradesh)
- Died: 23 September 2007 (aged 84)
- Citizenship: India
- Party: Congress
- Spouse: Mrs. K. Lakshmibai
- Children: 1 son & 2 daughters.
- Parent: Mr. Kandula Narsimloo (father)
- Profession: Legal practitioner & Politician

Kandula Ashanna (11 May 1923 – 23 September 2007) was an Indian politician and a Member of Parliament of India. He was a member of the 2nd Lok Sabha and represented the Adilabad constituency of Andhra Pradesh. Ashanna was a member of the Congress political party.

== Political career ==
Ashanna was the second elected M.P from Adilabad constituency. This was his only term in the Lok Sabha of India.

== Posts Held ==
#	From	To	Position	Comments
01	1957	1962	Member, 02nd Lok Sabha	

== See also ==
- Andhra Pradesh Legislative Assembly
- Lok Sabha
- Parliament of India
- Politics of India
