= S. A. Devshah =

Indian politician

MLA, 05th Assembly
- In office 1967 – 1972
- Preceded by: C. Madhava Reddy
- Succeeded by: S. A. Devshah
- Constituency: Boath

MLA, 04th Assembly
- In office 1972 – 1977
- Preceded by: S. A. Devshah
- Succeeded by: T. Amar Singh
- Constituency: Boath

Personal details
- Citizenship: India
- Party: Indian National Congress
- Profession: Politician

S. A. Devshah (Telugu: స. ఆ. దేవ్శః) was an Indian politician and was a Member of the Legislative Assembly during the 4th and 5th assemblies of Andhra Pradesh.

== Political career ==
S. A. Devshah was Member of the Legislative Assembly from Boath constituency ^{[note]} for two straight terms. He was a member of the Indian National Congress political party. In 1967, he won by a margin of 5,623 votes whereas in the 1972 elections he won by 12,939 votes.

== Posts Held ==
#	From	To	Position	Comments
01	1967	1972	Member, 4th Assembly	
02	1972	1977	Member, 5th Assembly	

== See also ==
- Boath (Assembly constituency)
- Andhra Pradesh Legislative Assembly
- Government of India
- Indian National Congress
- Politics of India

== Notes ==
- Boath Assembly constituency was a part of the Andhra Pradesh Legislative Assembly till 2014. In 2014, the state of Andhra Pradesh was bifurcated into Andhra Pradesh and Telangana. Boath Assembly constituency is now a part of Telangana Legislative Assembly.
