= Sarojini Pulla Reddy =

Indian politician

Mayor of Hyderabad
- In office 1965 - 1966
- Preceded by: Rani Kumudini Devi
- Succeeded by: Mir Akber Ali Naser

Member of Legislative Assembly Andhra Pradesh
- In office 1962 - 1972
- Preceded by: Mir Ahmed Ali Khan
- Succeeded by: Kandala Prabhakar Reddy
- Constituency: Malakpet

Personal details
- Born: 22 February 1923 Mahbubnagar
- Died: 3 February 2013 (aged 89) Hyderabad, Telangana, India
- Party: Indian National Congress
- Spouse: Dr. Pulla Reddy Bolumpalli

Sarojini Pulla Reddy (1923-2013) was the second woman Mayor of Hyderabad Municipal Corporation, veteran Indian National Congress leader and former minister of Andhra Pradesh.

== Early life ==
Sarojini Pulla Reddy was born on 22 February 1923 to Konda Reddy and Anusuya Reddy in Mahbubnagar, Hyderabad State (now Telangana).

== Career ==
Sarojini Pulla Reddy joined the Indian National Congress party in 1963 and in 1964 won a seat in the municipal elections. She was the second woman Mayor of Hyderabad Municipal Corporation from 1965 to 1966 and the immediate successor of Rani Janumpalli Kumudini Devi who is the first Mayor of Hyderabad Municipal Corporation from 1962 to 1964. She was elected to the Andhra Pradesh Legislative Assembly twice from Malakpet constituency, in 1967 and 1972, but lost in 1978 by a narrow margin of 1,000 votes. She became the first chairperson of Hyderabad Urban Development Authority in 1975. She was nominated to the Legislative Council and inducted into the cabinet by then chief minister Marri Chenna Reddy in 1979.

Reddy served as Municipal Administration minister, Information and Public Relations and Women and Child Welfare ministries between 1978–82 in the cabinets of Tanguturi Anjaiah, Bhavanam Venkatarami Reddy and Kotla Vijaya Bhaskara Reddy.

Reddy was the first woman to be president of the Hyderabad Congress Committee. She had a stint as a general secretary of the Andhra Pradesh Congress Committee during Jalagam Vengala Rao's stewardship. Later on, she was vice-president of the APCC under successive PCC chiefs. She was a member of the Congress Working Committee, the highest policy-making body of the party in 2001.

== Personal life ==
Reddy married Dr. Pulla Reddy Bolumpalli in 1945. The couple had a son. She died on February 3, 2013, at her Bowenpally residence due to pancreatic cancer. She was cremated with state honours.
