= Anil Jadhav =

Indian politician

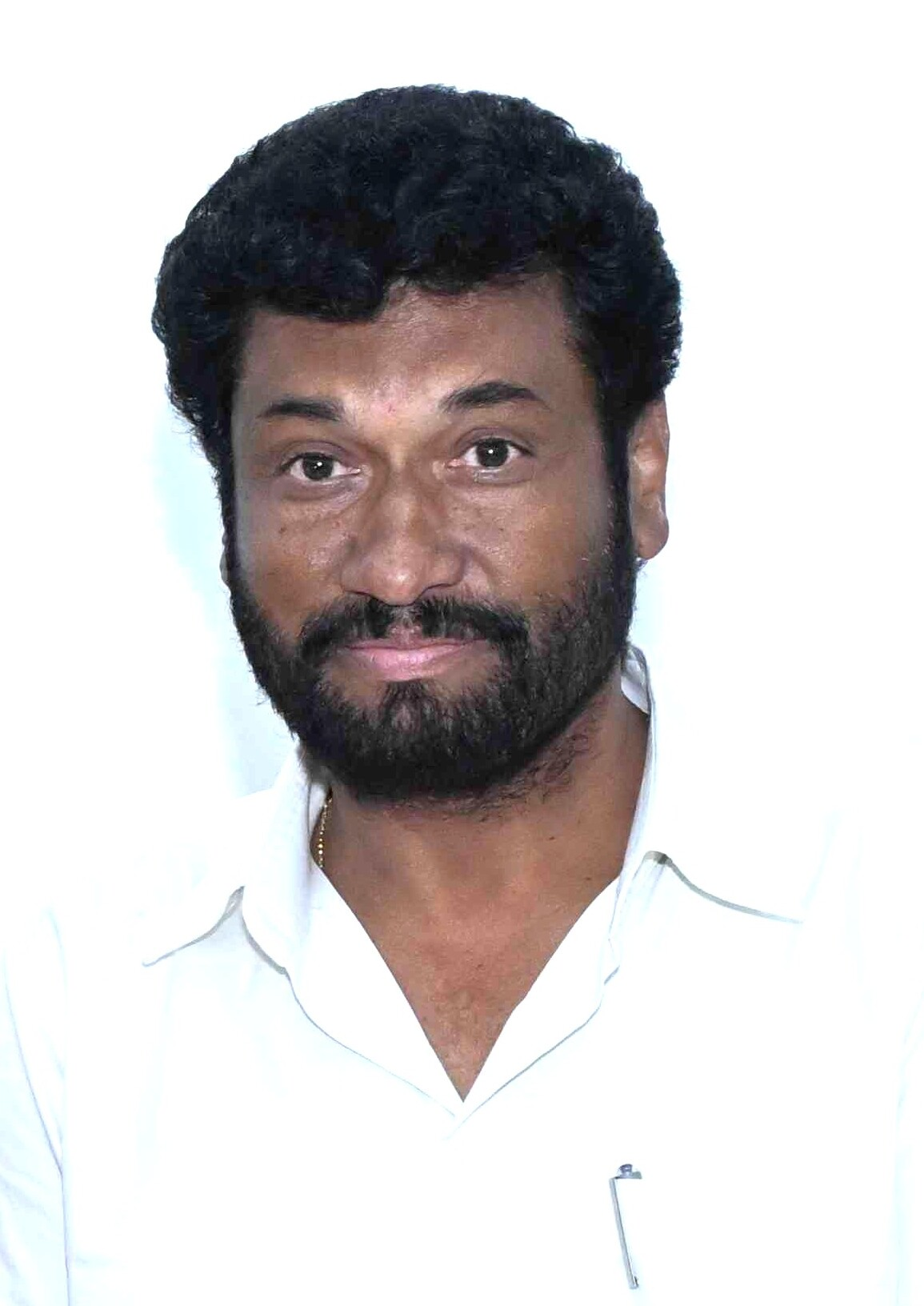

Member of the Telangana Legislative Assembly
- Incumbent
- Assumed office 3 December 2023 – present
- Preceded by: Rathod Bapurao
- Constituency: Boath

Personal details
- Born: 1971 (age 54–55) Adilabad
- Party: Bharat Rashtra Samithi
- Occupation: Politician

Anil Jadhav is a member of 3rd Telangana Assembly representing Boath Assembly constituency in the Adilabad District. He belongs to Bharat Rashtra Samithi.
