= Gudihathnur =

Coordinates: 19°34′13″N 78°27′06″E

Gudihathnur is a village and a Mandal located in Adilabad district of the Indian state of Telangana. It is situated approximately 20 km (12 mi) from the Adilabad city and can be accessible via National Highway 7.
