= G. Nagesh =

Indian politician

Nagesh Ramarao Godam

Member of Parliament, Lok Sabha
- Incumbent
- Assumed office 4 June 2024
- Preceded by: Soyam Bapu Rao
- Constituency: Adilabad Lok Sabha constituency
- In office 2014–2019
- Preceded by: Ramesh Rathod
- Succeeded by: Soyam Bapu Rao

Member of Andhra Pradesh Legislative Assembly
- In office (1994-1999), (1999-2004), (2009 – 2014)
- Preceded by: Godam Ramarao
- Succeeded by: Soyam Bapu Rao
- Constituency: Boath

Personal details
- Born: 21 October 1964 (age 61) Jatarla, Adilabad, Telangana
- Party: Bharatiya Janata Party
- Other political affiliations: Bharat Rashtra Samithi; Telugu Desam Party
- Spouse: Latha Bai
- Children: Godam Manognya, Godam Rithvik
- Parent(s): Godam Ramarao (former MLA), Bheembai

Nagesh Ramarao Godam (born 21 October 1964), is an Indian politician. He hails from the Gond people.

- G. Nagesh was elected to the Andhra Pradesh Legislative Assembly in the 1994 election from the Boath seat, contesting as a Telugu Desam Party candidate. His father G. Rama Rao, former Minister for Tribal Welfare, was incumbent legislator of Boath at the time. G. Nagesh won the seat, obtaining 51,593 votes (65.27% of the votes in the constituency).
  - He was amongst the youngest legislators in the Legislative Assembly at the time. G. Nagesh was named as Minister of State for Scheduled Tribes Welfare and Welfare of the Handicapped in the TDP state government after the election.

He retained the Boath seat in the 1999 election, obtaining 49,155 votes (56.17%). He lost the Boath seat in the 2004 election, finishing in second place with 41,567 votes. Reportedly his father opposed his candidature in the 2004 election.

- He re-captured the Boath seat in the 2009 Legislative Assembly election, obtaining 64,895 votes (55.92%). G. Nagesh served as the president of the TDP district unit in Adilabad. He has also served as chairman of the Girijan Cooperative Corporation.

Ahead of the 2014 Lok Sabha election, he left the TDP and joined the Bharat Rashtra Samithi (BRS) instead. He was admitted to the TRS by the party chief K. Chandrasekhar Rao on 3 March 2014. After joining TRS he was listed as the candidate of the party in the Boath Legislative Assembly seat. However, G. Nagesh asked to get the nomination for the Adilabad Lok Sabha seat instead. On 8 April 2014, he was declared as the TRS candidate for the Adilabad Lok Sabha seat. In 2019, Nagesh lost the election to Soyam Bapu Rao.

Godam Nagesh joined the Bharatiya Janata Party on 10 March 2024 in the presence of party's General Secretary and Telangana state incharge Tarun Chugh in New Delhi ahead of 2024 Lok Sabha elections.

== Electoral history ==
Year	Constituency	Party	Votes	Opponent		Result	Margin
1994	Boath	TDP	51,593	INC	K. Chouhan	Won	28,140
1999	Boath	TDP	49,155	INC	Kodapa Kosurao	Won	22,175
2004	Boath	TDP	41,567	INC	Soyam Bapu Rao	Lost	-12,400
2009	Boath	TDP	64,895	INC	Soyam Bapu Rao	Won	30,995
2014	Adilabad	TRS	430,847	INC	Naresh	Won	171,290
2019	Adilabad	TRS	318,814	BJP	Soyam Bapu Rao	Lost	-58,560
2024	Adilabad	BJP	568,168	INC	Athram Suguna	Won	90,652
