= Alleti Maheshwar Reddy =

Indian politician

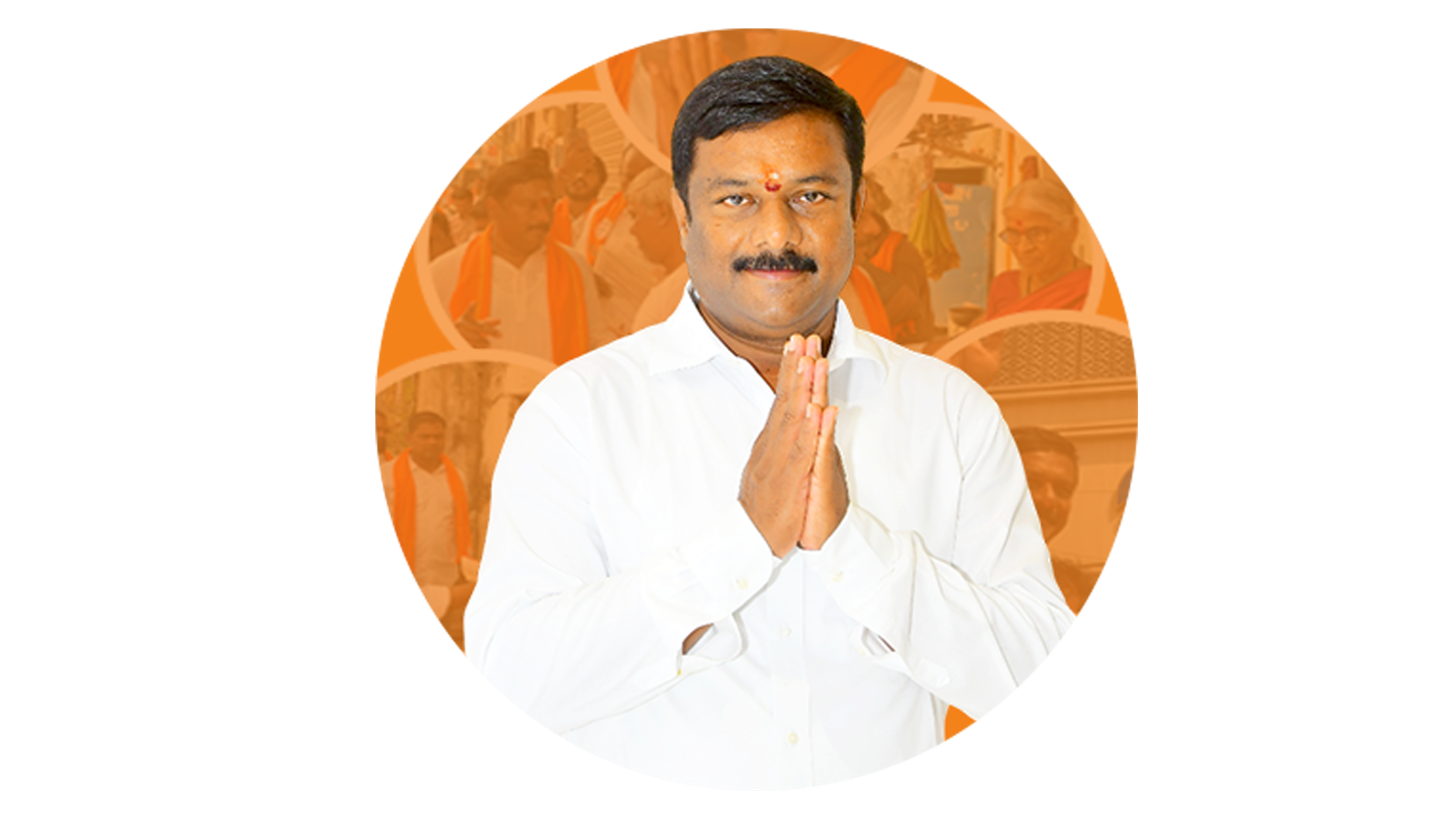

Member of Telangana Legislative Assembly
- Incumbent
- Assumed office 3 December 2023
- Preceded by: Allola Indrakaran Reddy
- Constituency: Nirmal

Member of Andhra Pradesh Legislative Assembly
- In office 16 May 2009 – 16 May 2014
- Preceded by: Allola Indrakaran Reddy
- Succeeded by: Allola Indrakaran Reddy
- Constituency: Nirmal

Personal details
- Party: Bharatiya Janata Party
- Other political affiliations: Praja Rajyam Party
- Education: Bachelor of Arts
- Alma mater: Osmania University

Alleti Maheshwar Reddy is an Indian politician and a member of the 3rd Telangana Assembly representing Nirmal Assembly constituency. He is also the floor leader of the Bharatiya Janata Party in the assembly.

He earlier served as the member of Andhra Pradesh Legislative Assembly from 2009 to 2014 representing Praja Rajyam Party.

== Early life and education ==
Maheshwar Reddy was born in Nirmal, Telangana to A. Padmanabha Reddy and his spouse. His father was a prominent local figure who served as the Ex-Municipal Chairman of Nirmal.

He completed his schooling at St. Paul’s High School and later pursued higher education, earning a Post Graduate Diploma in Business Management (PGDBM). He is also a graduate in Bachelor of Arts from Osmania University.

== Political career ==
Maheshwar Reddy began his journey in public service as a student leader, actively participating in student-level politics with the National Students' Union of India (NSUI)

He held several key organizational roles in his ealry stages of Politics, including:

- General Secretary of NSUI.
- State General Secretary of the Youth Congress.
- Chairman of the AICC (All India Congress Committee) Program Implementation Committee.

=== Legislative Career. ===
- 2009 : Entered the Andhra Pradesh Legislative Assembly for the first time representing the Praja Rajyam Party (PRP) from the Nirmal constituency against Allola Indrakaran Reddy being nearest rival.
- 2014 : As Praja Rajyam Party merged into Indian National Congress, Maheshwar Reddy contested on Congress Ticket.
- 2018 : Contested on behalf of Congress Ticket and lost to the nearest rival Allola Indrakaran Reddy with a margin of 9271 votes.
- 2023 : After joining the Bharatiya Janata Party in April 2023, he contested the 2023 Telangana Legislative Assembly Elections and was elected as the MLA for Nirmal, defeating the incumbent Allola Indrakaran Reddy.
- 2024–Present: He was appointed as the BJP Floor Leader in the Telangana Legislative Assembly.

== Family and Heritage ==
Maheshwar Reddy comes from a family with a deep history of political and social service:

- Grandfather : A. Rajeshwar Reddy, a noted Freedom Fighter who participated in the armed struggle against the Razakars and was imprisoned in ASIFABAD Jail for his activism. He also served as the first Municipal Chairman of Nirmal and was an advocate by profession.
- Father :A. Padmanabha Reddy, who carried on the family legacy as a local political leader and former Municipal Chairman.

== Philanthrophy and Social Work ==
He founded the Maheshwara Trust in 2006, which focuses on educational welfare in the Nirmal region.

The trust is known for:

- Providing free education to underprivileged students in professional courses such as Engineering, MBA, and MCA.
- Supporting "few in 100" initiative, where for every 100 students, a specific number receive entirely free education and medical assistance.

== Electoral History ==
=== Legislative Assembly Elections ===
Year	Constituency	Party	Votes	%	Opponent	Party	Votes	%	Result	Margin	%
2023	Nirmal	BJP	1,06,400	54.03	Allola Indrakaran Reddy	BRS	55,697	28.28	Won	+50,703	+25.75
2018	Nirmal	INC	70,714	40.86	Allola Indrakaran Reddy	TRS	79,985	46.21	Lost	-9,271	-5.35
2014	Nirmal	INC	38,951	24.12	Allola Indrakaran Reddy	BSP	61,368	38.00	Lost	-22,417	-13.88
2009	Nirmal	PRP	44,261	33.64	Allola Indrakaran Reddy	INC	41,716	31.71	Won	+2,545	+1.93
