= Nirmal furniture =

Furniture made in Nirmal, India

Nirmal Furniture is furniture made in Nirmal, Adilabad, Telangana, India. It received Geographical Indication rights in 2009. It is handmade wooden furniture. The Iconic Nirmal Furniture is famous around the world for its unique painted designs and the smoothest finishing.

== See also ==
- List of Geographical Indications in India
