= Poddutoori Ganga Reddy =

Member of Parliament, Lok Sabha
- In office 1967–1977
- Preceded by: G. Narayan Reddy
- Succeeded by: G. Narsimha Reddy
- Constituency: Adilabad

Personal details
- Born: 7 June 1933 village Torath, Nizamabad, (Andhra Pradesh, now in Telangana)
- Died: 3 January 2008 (aged 74)
- Citizenship: India
- Party: Congress
- Spouse: Mrs. Susheela Devi
- Children: 1 son & 5 daughters.
- Parent: Mr. P. Raja Reddy (father)
- Education: Osmania University
- Profession: Agriculturist & Politician

Poddutoori Ganga Reddy (7 June 1933 – 3 January 2008) was an Indian politician and was Member of Parliament of India. He was a member of the 4th and 5th Lok Sabhas. Reddy represented the Adilabad constituency of Andhra Pradesh (now in Telangana) and was a member of the Congress political party. He died on 3 January 2008

== Early life and education ==
Poddutoori Ganga Reddy was born in the village Torath, Nizamabad in the state of Andhra Pradesh. He attended the Osmania University and attained B.A & LL.B degrees. By profession, Reddy was an Agriculturist.

== Political career ==
Poddutoori Ganga Reddy was M.P. from Adilabad constituency for two straight terms. He was also the Chairman of Zila Parishad in Adilabad district.

== Posts Held ==
#	From	To	Position	Comments
01	1967	1970	Member, 04th Lok Sabha	
02	1971	1977	Member, 05th Lok Sabha	
03	1979	1983	MLA, Andhra Pradesh Legislature Assembly	

== See also ==
- Parliament of India
- Politics of India
- Zila Parishad
