= Madhusudhan Reddy Takkala =

Indian politician

Member of parliament, Lok Sabha
- Constituency: Adilabad

Personal details
- Born: 14 January 1946 (age 80) Adilabad, Andhra Pradesh
- Party: TRS
- Spouse: Lakshmi Devi
- Children: 1 son and 1 daughter
- As of 26 September, 2006

Madhusudhan Reddy Takkala (born 14 January 1946) is a member of the 14th Lok Sabha of India. He represents the Adilabad constituency of Andhra Pradesh and is a member of the Telangana Rashtra Samithi (TRS) political party.
