= Nirmal =

- City
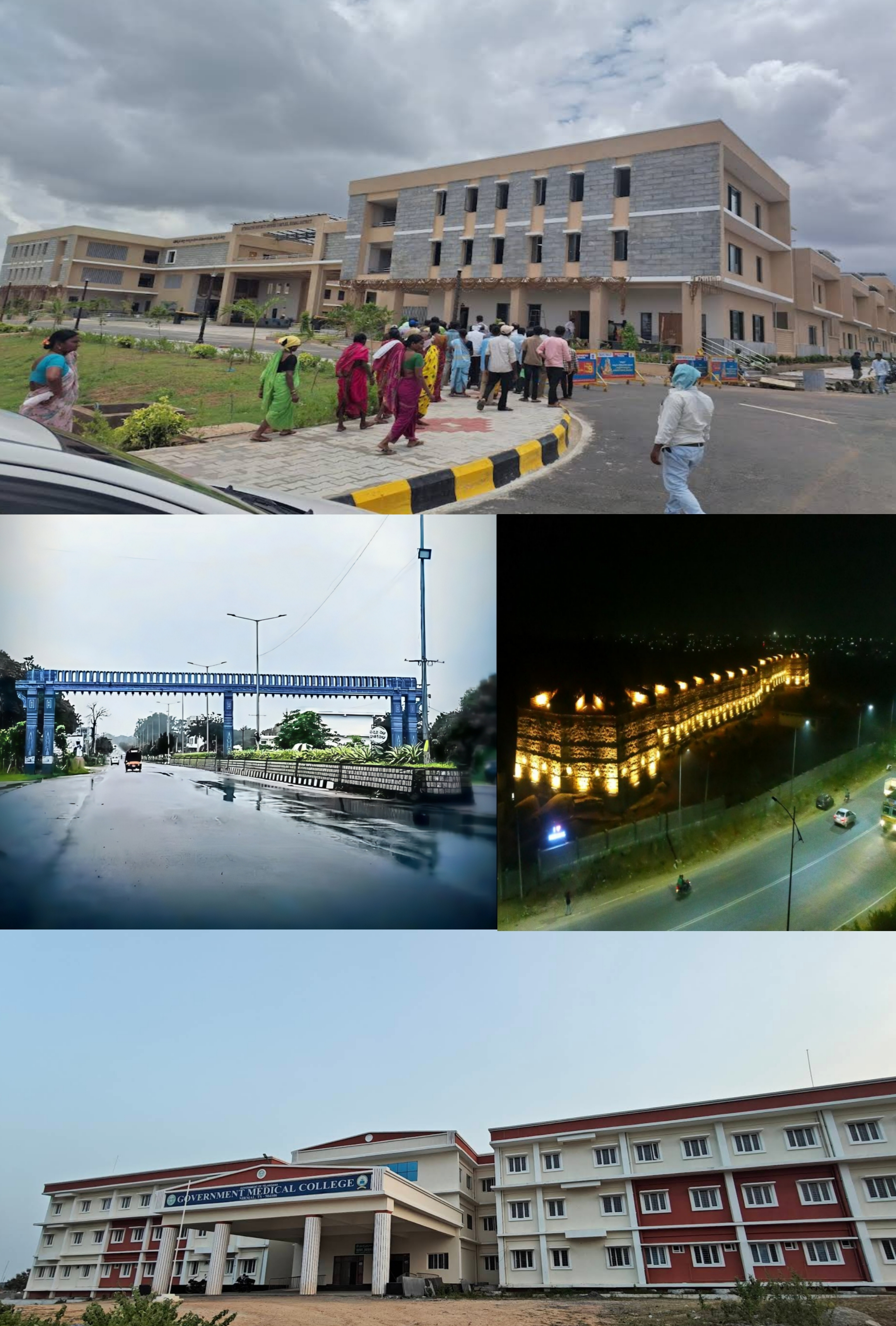
- Clockwise from top: Nirmal District collectorate, Shamgarh fort, Govt medical College nirmal, Welcome arch on entrance of Nirmal.

- Location in Telangana, India Nirmal (India)
- Coordinates: 19.1°N 78.35°E
- Country: India
- State: Telangana
- District: Nirmal
- Founder: Nimmanayudu
- Named for: Nimmanayudu

Government
  - Type: Municipal council
  - Body: Nirmal Municipality
  - MLA: Alleti Maheshwar Reddy
  - SP: G. Janaki Sharmila, IPS

Area
  - City: 32.06 km^{2} (12.38 sq mi)
- Elevation: 350 m (1,150 ft)

Population (2011)
  - City: 146,000
  - Rank: 16th in(Telangana)
  - Density: 4,550/km^{2} (11,800/sq mi)
  - Urban: (NUDA)
- Demonym: Nirmalite

Language
  - Official: Telugu, urdu
- Time zone: UTC+5:30 (IST)
- PIN: 504106
- Telephone code: 08734
- Vehicle registration: TG-18
- Planning Agency: Nirmal Urban Development Authority(NUDA)
- Sex ratio: 50:50 ♂/♀
- Lok Sabha constituency: Adilabad
- Vidhan Sabha constituency: Nirmal

Nirmal is a city and the district headquarters of Nirmal district in the Indian state of Telangana. It is famed for Nirmal paintings, Nirmal furniture and Nirmal toys and craft made out of wood.

The district headquarters is located in the city of Nirmal. It borders the Telangana districts of Adilabad, Nizamabad, Mancherial, Asifabad, Jagtial districts as well as Nanded district of the state Maharashtra.

== Geography ==
Nirmal is located at 19.10°N 78.35°E. It has an average elevation of 340 metres (1100 feet) on the foot hills of Nirmal range, which is located in the Deccan plateau.Nirmal has chain tanks built around it.

== Demographics ==
Historical population
| Year | Pop. | ±% |
|---|---|---|
| 1901 | 7,751 | — |
| 1911 | 9,588 | +23.7% |
| 1921 | 9,457 | −1.4% |
| 1931 | 12,585 | +33.1% |
| 1941 | 14,499 | +15.2% |
| 1951 | 17,947 | +23.8% |
| 1961 | 19,896 | +10.9% |
| 1971 | 28,529 | +43.4% |
| 1981 | 41,412 | +45.2% |
| 1991 | 57,761 | +39.5% |
| 2001 | 75,254 | +30.3% |
| 2011 | 88,433 | +17.5% |

In the 2011 Indian census, the total population of Nirmal was 88,433. There are 44,053 males (49.82%) and 44,380 females (50.18%). 10,303 children are below 6 years of age. There 5,315 males and 4,988 females. . As per the house hold survey conducted by Telangana government in August 2014, the population of Nirmal is 116,800.

Major languages are Telugu, Urdu and English. Telugu has been the official language since 1956.

== Government and politics ==
=== Civic administration ===
It is one of the oldest municipalities in Telangana. Nirmal Municipality was constituted in 1952 and is classified as a second grade municipality with 36 election wards. The jurisdiction of the civic body is spread over an area of 32.06 km^{2} (12.38 mi^{2}). On June 28, 2019 Telangana Government has increased No. of Election Wards to 42 with the merging of surrounding two gram panchayats namely Manjulapur and Venkatapur in Nirmal Municipality.

=== Politics ===
Nirmal Assembly constituency is a constituency of Telangana Legislative Assembly, India.It comes under Adilabad (Lok Sabha constituency) along with six other Assembly constituencies. The first elections of nirmal constituency were held in 1957 with India's first national general election.
