= Adilabad Rural mandal =

Adilabad mandal
- Mandal
- Country: India
- State: Telangana
- District: Adilabad
- Headquarters: Adilabad

Government
  - Body: Mandal Parishad

Languages
  - Official: Telugu
- Time zone: UTC+5:30 (IST)

Adilabad mandal is one of the 52 mandals in Adilabad district of the Indian state of Telangana. It is under the administration of Adilabad revenue division and the headquarters are located at Adilabad. The mandal is bounded by Jainad, Bela, Inderavelly, Gudihatnur, Talamadugu and Tamsi mandals.

== Government and politics ==
Adilabad mandal is one of the three mandals under Adilabad assembly constituency, which in turn represents Adilabad lok sabha constituency of Telangana Legislative Assembly.

== Towns and villages ==
As of 2011 census, the mandal has 43 settlements. It includes 2 towns and 41 villages.

The settlements in the mandal are listed below:

1. Adilabad (M)
2. Ankapoor
3. Ankoli
4. Anukunta
5. Arli (Buzurg)
6. Asodabhurki
7. Battisawargaon
8. Belluri
9. Bheemseri
10. Borenur
11. Chanda
12. Chichadhari
13. Chinchughat
14. Dasnapur (CT)
15. Dimma
16. Ganeshpur
17. Hathigutta
18. Jamuldhari
19. Kachkanti
20. Khanapoor
21. Khandala
22. Kottur (Nevegaon)
23. Kumbhajheri
24. Landasangvi
25. Lohara
26. Lokari
27. Maleborgaon
28. Mallapur
29. Maregaon
30. Mavala
31. Nishanghat
32. Pippaldhari
33. Pochara
34. Ramai
35. Rampoor (Royati)
36. Takli
37. Tarada (Srimath)
38. Tippa
39. Tontoli
40. Waghapur
41. Wanwat
42. Yapalguda
43. Jamdapur

Note: M-Municipality

== See also ==
- List of mandals in Telangana
