= Adilabad (disambiguation) =

Adilabad is a city in the Indian state of Telangana.

Adilabad may also refer to:

== Places ==
- Adilabad district
  - Adilabad Rural mandal
  - Adilabad (Lok Sabha constituency)
  - Adilabad (Assembly constituency)
- Adilabad, Raebareli, a village in Uttar Pradesh, India

== See also ==
- Adilabad Fort
- Adilabad railway station
- Adelabad (disambiguation)
