= 1981 Indravelli massacre =

1981 massacre of indigenous people in India

The Indravelli massacre was an incident on April 20, 1981, where a gathering of Gond Adivasis, some organised by the Girijana Rythu Coolie Sangham (GRCS) front group of the Kondapalli Seetharamaiah faction of the CPI (ML) and some attending the local market, were fired on by police officers at the village of Indravelli in what was then Andhra Pradesh, but today in the state of Telangana. The rally was organised to demand land certificates for Adivasis, and to protest encroachments by non-Adiviasis. While initially granted permission to assemble, this was later revoked in fear of agitation by Naxalites.

== The Incident ==
The official report claimed that a group of 30 police and five officials opened fire after they were attacked and one of their number speared to death. An investigation by M. Raghuram for the Economic and Political Weekly as well as a separate report by the Andhra Civil Liberties Committee found that the number of police officers present was substantially higher, with a large portion of the district force having been summoned to the village the previous day. On April 19 the police went round Indravelli in the evening announcing that section 144 Criminal Procedure Code was imposed in the area, effectively banning the meeting on April 20. Four platoons of policemen occupied the local high school and camped there. On the day of the massacre, local shops were closed, the village cordoned, and passengers were prevented from disembarking buses in Indravelli. While police prevented the Gonds from entering the village and even fired on them, they escorted non-adivasi leaders of the Congress(I) towards the district centre, Adilabad where they instigated non-Adivasi traders and lower caste Hindus to come and fight the Gonds who were "burning and looting their houses in Indravelli". After the police opened fire en-masse, fleeing Gonds were run over by a police jeep whose armed occupants fired point blank. Police snipers were also allegedly positioned in trees and haystacks around the village.

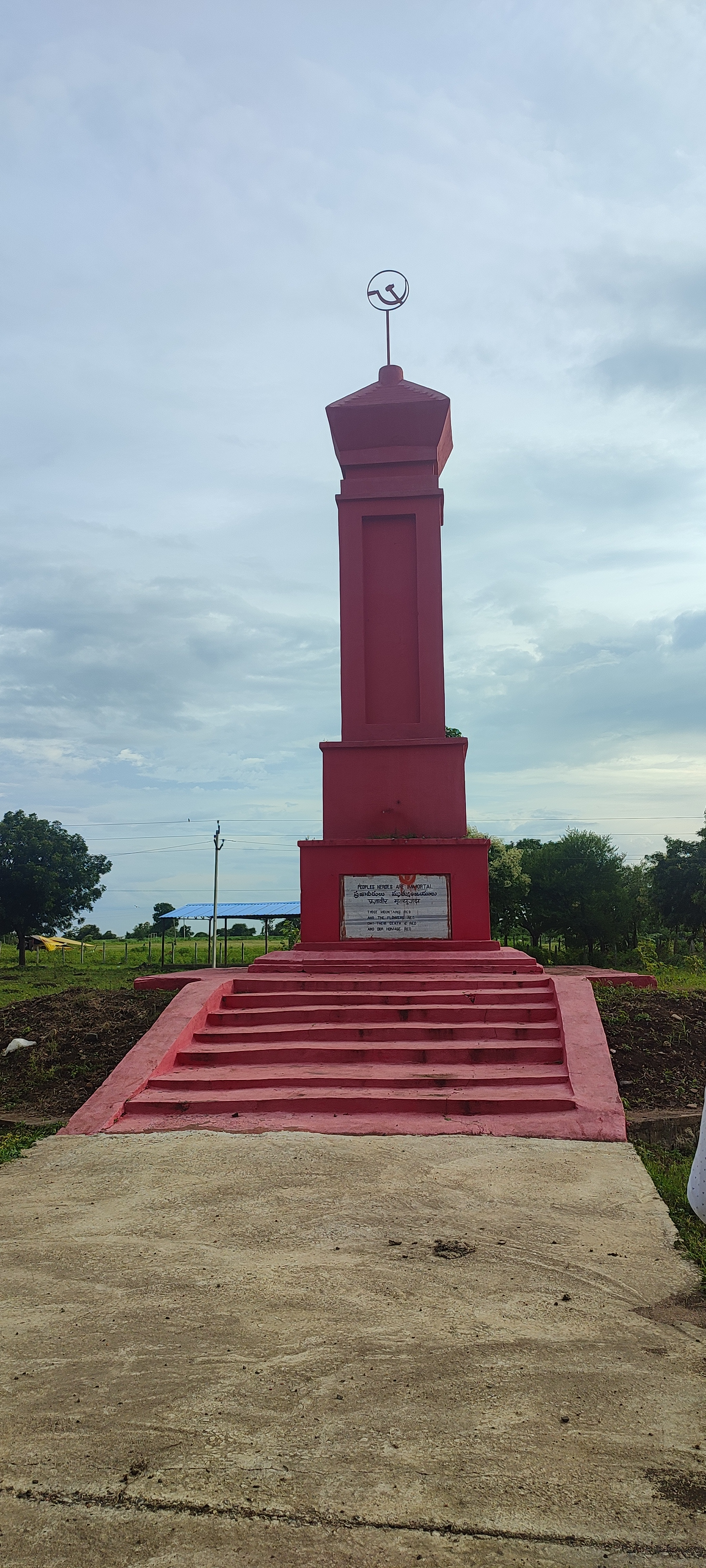
Indravelli massacre Monument

== The Aftermath ==
The Home Ministry report on the incident claimed 13 dead and nine injured. However, according to Raghuram's report, witnesses believed that more than 60 bodies were left on the spot that day, later secretly cremated at Abilabad. Many of the seriously injured were piled on top of each other in two vans and taken to the Adilabad District Hospital. Hospital staff claimed that at least ten of the injured died en route with more than 20 dying at the hospital. Witnesses in nearby towns, including Congress(I) members reported dead bodies on the roadside left by the fleeing Gonds, or shot by pursuing police, with totals as follows. Utnoor town (30-40), Ichoda town (25) and Muthnoor village (30). Still others were said to have died hiding in the jungle, with bodies being recovered as late as April 26. The final death toll was estimated by the Andhra Civil Liberties Committee at over 100, and by EPW at nearly 250. Many contemporary reports cite the death toll at 60.

According to former People's War Group (PWG) Abilabad district committee member Nayannagari Ravi, the massacre resulted in many Adivasis joining the armed wings of Naxalite groups. For example, the PWG which had been formed only a year prior, saw their formerly largely non-Adiviasi local "dalam" membership increase from a few dozen to over 250. In 1983 a memorial to the victims was constructed by GRCS president Ganji Rama Rao, who was allegedly inspired by similar columns he had seen in Beijing. In 1986, it was destroyed, allegedly by police in retaliation to a Naxalite raid on a police camp at Kadem, but was reconstructed the following year. The massacre is commemorated on a yearly basis by the Indravelli Amaraveerula Sadhana Samiti, although only from 2002 onwards on the date of the massacre. Prior to this, police had prevented the commemoration on the day itself.
