= Nagoba Jatara =

Hindu tribal festival in Telangana, India

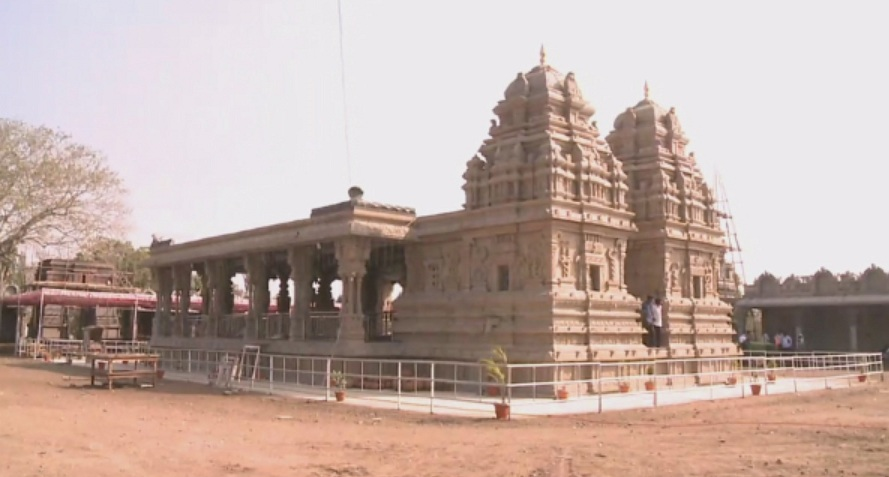
- Observed by: Gond Dynasty
- Type: Tribe Rajput
- Celebrations: 10 days
- Observances: Offering to the Goddess
- Begins: January
- Date: Annual - February

Nagoba Jatara is Naagvanshi Gond tribal festival held in Keslapur, Indravelly mandal Adilabad district, Telangana, India. It is the second largest tribal carnival in India. It is celebrated by the Mesram clan of Gond and Pardhan tribes for ten days. Clan members from the surrounding states of Maharashtra, Chhattisgarh, Odisha, and Madhya Pradesh also participate in the festival. The Government of Telangana has declared it as a state festival.

It starts in the Hindu lunar month of Pushya Masam. The 'bheting' ceremony is an integral part, where the new brides are introduced to the clan god during their first jatara after marriage.

== Temple construction ==
Mesram clan members used to worship only the holy place (putta) where the Goddess Nagoba is believed to have appeared long ago. In 1956, a small hut was built with thatched roofs, and in 1995, a small temple was built with cement and bricks. The temple was built in 2000 with the help of the government. A new temple was constructed out of stone in 2022.
