= Gayatri Waterfalls =

- Location within Telangana Location within India
- Location: Kuntala, Adilabad district, Telangana
- Coordinates: 19°01′00″N 78°35′00″E
- Type: Waterfall

Gayatri Waterfalls is one of the several waterfalls around Adilabad district, along with Kuntala Waterfall and Pochera Falls. The waterfall is situated in a remote, forested area and is located approximately 5 km from Tarnam Khurd, near Neredigonda in Adilabad district of the Indian state of Telangana.

== See also ==
- List of waterfalls
- List of waterfalls in India
