= Kuntala =

Kuntala may refer to:

- Kuntala country, a historical region in Karnataka and Maharashtra states of India
- Kuntala, Adilabad district, a village in Telangana, India
- Kuntala Mandal, a village in Telangana, India
- Kuntala Waterfall, on the Kadam river in Telangana, India
- Kuntala Kumari Sabat, Indian poet writing in Odia
- Kuntala Ghosh Dastidar, Indian football coach and former footballer

== See also ==
- Kuntalam, a raga in Indian classical music
- Kantoli, a 5th-century historical kingdom in Sumatra, Indonesia
