= Bazarhathnoor =

- Village
- Location in Telangana, India Bazarhathnoor (India)
- Coordinates: 19.4573°N 78.3573°E
- Country: India
- State: Telangana
- District: Adilabad

Area
  - Total: 15.81 km^{2} (6.10 sq mi)

Population (2011)
  - Total: 4,569
  - Density: 289.0/km^{2} (748.5/sq mi)

Languages
  - Official: Telugu
- Time zone: UTC+5:30 (IST)
- PIN: 504304
- Telephone code: 08751
- Vehicle registration: TS–01
- Nearest city: Adilabad
- Vidhan Sabha constituency: Boath
- Climate: hot (Köppen)
- Website: telangana.gov.in

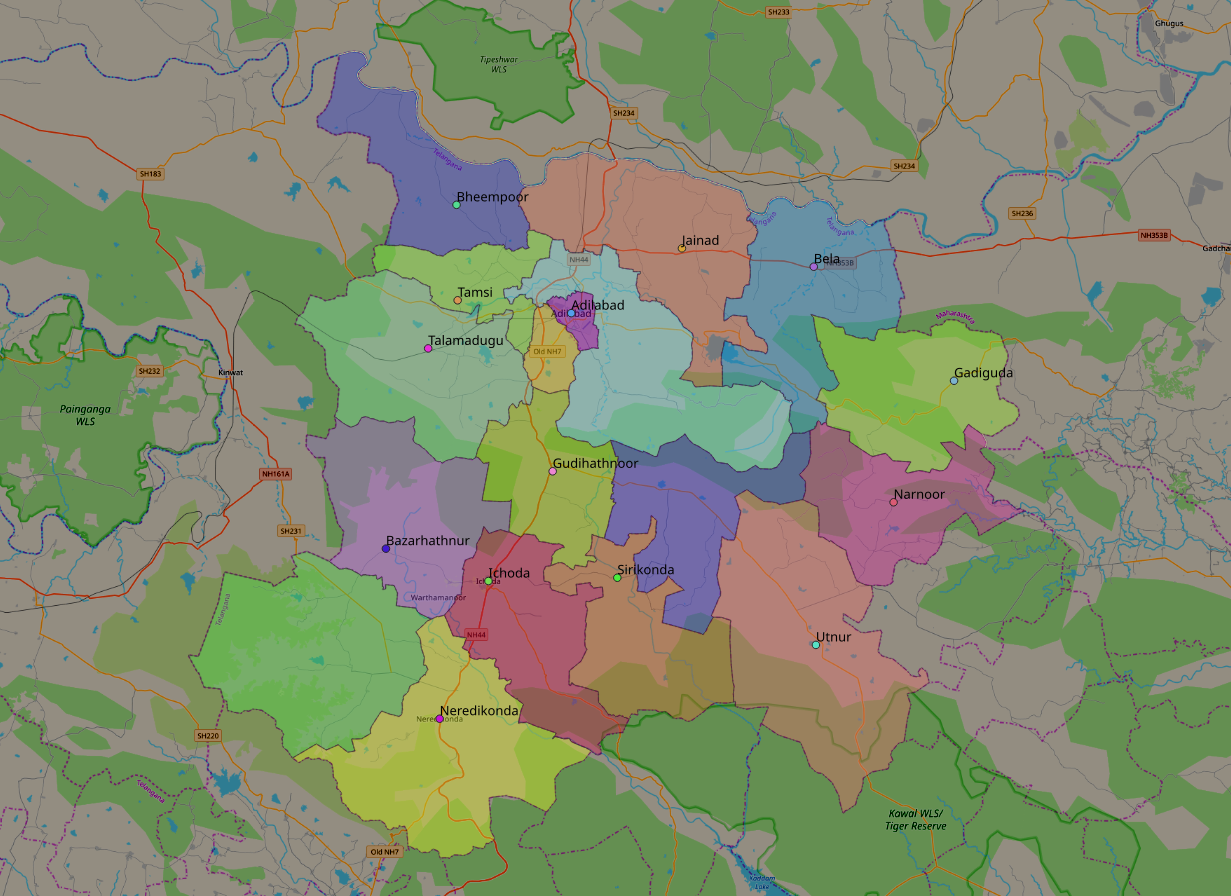

Bazarhathnoor is a village in Adilabad district of the Indian state of Telangana. It is located in Bazarhathnoor mandal of Adilabad revenue division. Bazarhathnoor is a mandal headquarter, 36 km (22 mi) south of its district headquarter Adilabad. Its local language are Telugu and Urdu. Bazarhathnoor total population is 4569 and number of houses are 1044. Female population is 50.2% of its total population. Baazarhathnoor's literacy rate is 55.0% and the female literacy rate is 22.5%.(2011 census). It is 299 meters above sea level. It has assembly and lok sabha constituency.

== Demographics ==
Bazarhathnoor village has a population of 3,767 in 2001.
