= Ponna (disambiguation) =

Ponna is a municipality in the province of Como in the Italian region of Lombardy

Ponna may also refer to:

== Places ==
- Ponna, a common name for Ixora, a genus of flowering plants in the family Rubiaceae
- Ponna, a village in the town of Ichoda, Adilabad district, state of Telangana, India

== People ==
- Ponna (poet) (c. 950), a Kannada poet in the court of Rashtrakuta king Krishna II

== See also ==
- Pune (previously Poona), city in the Indian state of Maharashtra
- Poona Horse, sometimes Ponna Horse, an armoured regiment of the Indian Army
