= Teegalapahad =

- Census Town
- Location in Telangana, India Teegalapahad (India)
- Coordinates: 19.6667°N 78.5333°E
- Country: India
- State: Telangana
- District: Adilabad

Area
  - Total: 2.80 km^{2} (1.08 sq mi)

Population (2011)
  - Total: 12,656
  - Density: 4,520/km^{2} (11,700/sq mi)

Languages
  - Official: Telugu
- Time zone: UTC+5:30 (IST)
- Vehicle registration: TS
- Website: telangana.gov.in

Teegalapahad is a census town located in Adilabad district of the Indian state of Telangana.

== Demographics ==
As of 2001, the India census established that Teegalapahad had a population of 33,070. Males constitute 51% of the population and females 49%. Teegalapahad has an average literacy rate of 64%, higher than the national average of 59.5%: male literacy is 71%, and female literacy is 55%. In Teegalapahad, 11% of the population is under 6 years of age.
