= Enumamula Agriculture Market =

Enumamula Agriculture Market is an agriculture market located in Enumamula, Warangal, Telangana, India. It is the second-biggest grain market in Asia. It is spread over 117 acres.

== History ==
The market is run by the Agriculture Market Committee of the Marketing Department, Government of Telangana. The total income, in 2024, was around 560M Indian rupees.

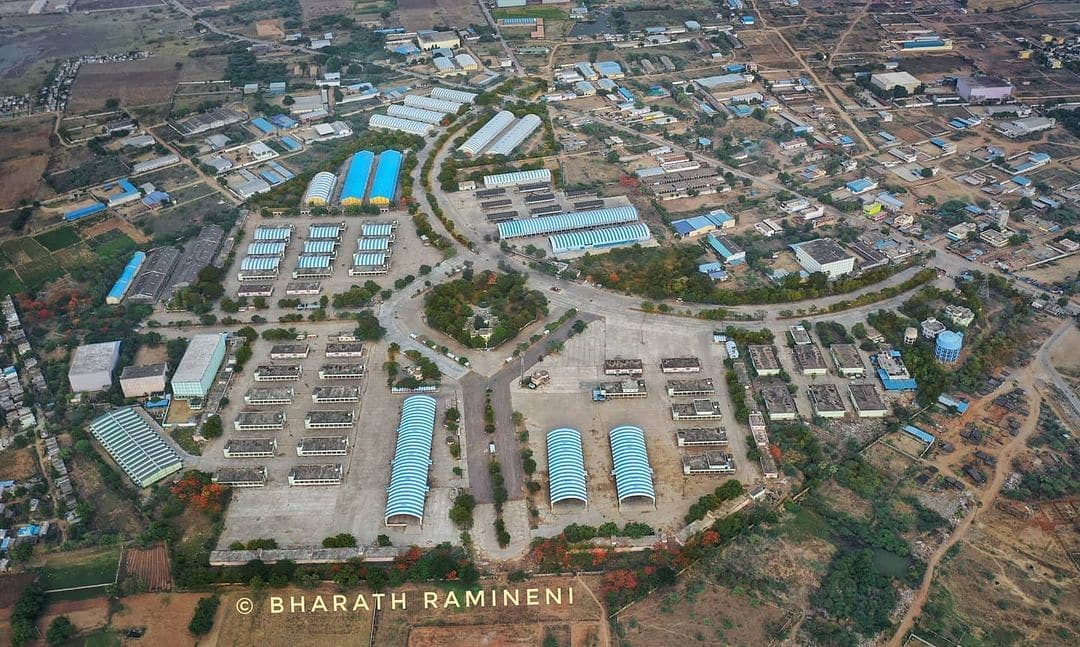
Enumamula Market Aerial View

== Market ==
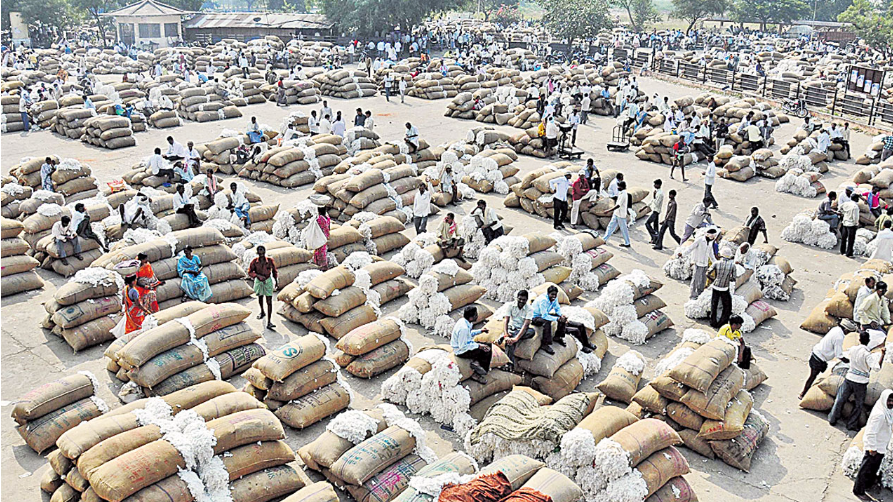
Cotton Farmers at Enumamula Market

The market has 450 commission agents (adithidar), 300 traders, 800 administrative staff and thousands of labors. It is divided into different yards based on the product, such as Mirchi Yard and Cotton Yard. The market serves as a big market for red chilies for Warangal and the neighboring regions of Nalgonda, Khammam, Adilabad and Karimnagar. Traders from Guntur and Maharashtra purchase chilies in the market.

== e-NAM project ==
The market was selected as one of 40 markets in Telangana by the Government of India for the National Agricultural Marketing Project (NAM project) in 2016. Use of electronic weighing scales was one of the reasons for its selection. The project helps with its new electronic trade system called e-NAM, by which any trader from participating markets can buy produce at the market and thus also reduce middlemen.
