= Kadam River =

River in Telangana, India

Coordinates: 19°04′27″N 78°50′25″E

The Kadem (Kadam) river is a tributary of Godavari located in the Nirmal District of Telangana near the village of Pandwapur (Pandapur or Pandavapur).

== Origin and Course ==
The river rises near Bazarhatnoor in the Adilabad District and flows south-east wards. The Kuntala Waterfall is formed on this river at Kuntala. It provides for a famous one day outing for Hyderabad. The Kaddam Project is a major reservoir across river Kadem, a tributary of the Godavari near Kaddam Mandal, Adilabad District, Telangana. Beyond the project, the river flows in a linear fashion into the Godavari.
