= Raitu =

Raitu is the Telugu word for "farmer".

It may refer to:

- Raithu Bidda, a 1939 Telugu film
- Raitu Coolie Sangham (Andhra Pradesh) (Farmers Labourers League (Andhra Pradesh)) is a revolutionary peasants' movement in the Indian state of Andhra Pradesh

== See also ==
- El Tor, Egypt, formerly called Raithu
