= Khanapur, Nirmal =

Khanapur
- Town
- Location in Telangana, India Khanapur (India)
- Coordinates: 19.0333°N 78.6667°E
- Country: India
- State: Telangana
- District: Nirmal district

Government
  - MLA: Sri Vedma Bhojju

Area
  - Total: 3 km^{2} (1.2 sq mi)
- Elevation: 229 m (751 ft)

Population (2014)
  - Total: 88,950
  - Density: 30,000/km^{2} (77,000/sq mi)

Languages
  - Official: Telugu ، Urdu
- Time zone: UTC+5:30 (IST)
- PIN: 504203
- Telephone code: 08730
- Vehicle registration: TS 18
- Nearest city: Nirmal
- Lok Sabha constituency: Nirmal
- Vidhan Sabha constituency: Khanapur
- Climate: hot (Köppen)
- Website: telangana.gov.in

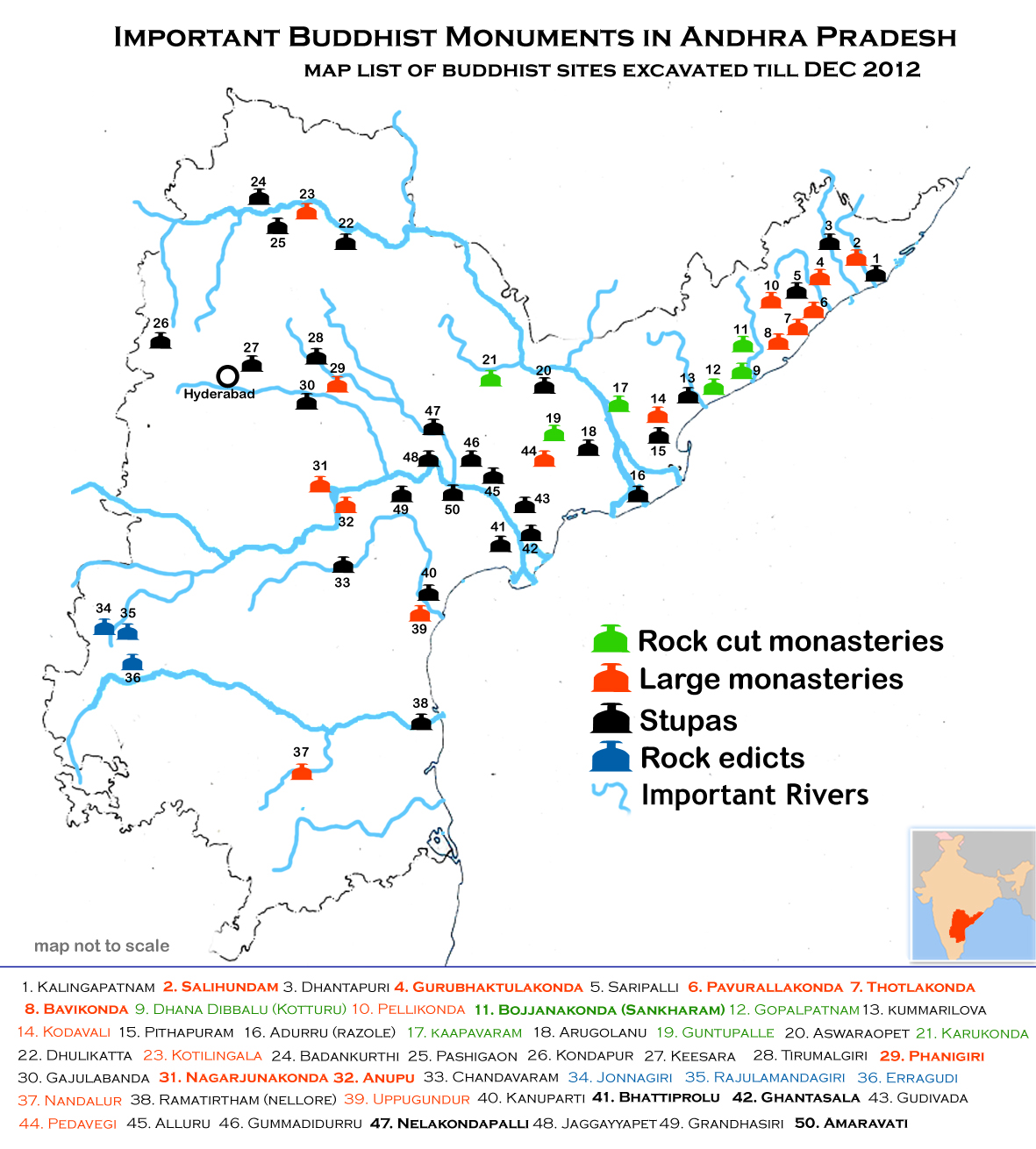
Badankurti near Khanapur is an Important Buddhist site of Telangana

Khanapur is a town in the Nirmal district of Telangana, India. It has 12 electoral wards, Mandal, Assembly Constituency and Revenue Division in Nirmal District. It is located near the Godavari River, which flows north.

== Geography ==
Khanapur is located at 19.0333°N 78.6667°E. It has an average elevation of 229 meters (754 feet). located on the banks of river Godavari.

Khanapur has a leisure place called Sadarmat which is small reservoir. Khanapur can be reached by 34 km west from Nirmal (NH-7).

== Demographics ==
According to the 2014 Indian census, the demographic details of Khanapur are as follows:

- Total population: 88,950 in 13,916 households
- Male population: 42,400
- Female Population: 36,950
- Children (under 6): 9,600
- Boys: 5,650
- Girls: 3,950
- Literate population: 39,252 (44%)
