= Ichoda =

Ichoda Echoda
- Town
- Location in Telangana, India Ichoda (India)
- Coordinates: 19.4333°N 78.4667°E
- Country: India
- State: Telangana
- District: Adilabad
- Elevation: 444 m (1,457 ft)

Population (2011)
  - Total: 12,357
  - Rank: 2nd ( In Adilabad District )

Languages
  - Official: Telugu Marathi Gondi Lambadi
- Time zone: UTC+5:30 (IST)
- Postal code: 504307
- Vehicle registration: TG 01
- Website: telangana.gov.in

Ichoda, is a town located in Adilabad district in the Indian states of Telangana.

== Geography ==
Ichoda is located at 19.4333°N 78.4667°E. It has an average elevation of 444 m (1,457 ft) above mean sea level.

== Demographics ==
According to Indian census, 2021, the demographic details of Ichoda mandal is as follows:

- Total Population: 52,179 in 11,373 Households.
- Male Population: 26,265 and Female Population: 26,575
- Children Under 6 years of age: 8,090 (Boys – 4,164 and Girls – 3,926)
- Total Literates: 27,272

Locations/Villages	Population 2011	Male	Female	Households
Neradigonda	572	289	283	116
Narayanapur	723	374	349	146
Sirichalma	1,896	959	937	429
Jogipet	338	180	158	58
Babjepet	489	232	257	112
Gandiwagu	349	160	189	69
Gaidpalle	155	66	89	26
Lingapur	85	43	42	19
Narsapur	1,937	992	945	439
Gundi	186	79	107	41
Keshapatnam	2,591	1,229	1,362	420
Makhra (Khurd)	560	277	283	117
Makhra (Buzurg)	1,742	860	882	363
Jalda	703	362	341	137
Mankapur	545	239	306	117
Malyal	885	438	447	205
Salyada	430	198	232	80
Dhaba Khurd	691	326	365	149
Navagaon	1,049	518	531	226
Chincholi	650	339	311	139
Girjam	1,064	520	544	270
Adegaon (Buzurg)	563	294	269	118
Jamidi	1,130	586	544	249
Madapur	1,238	633	605	234
Talamadri	1,323	631	692	307
Dhoba (Buzurg)	646	314	332	133
Soanpalle	1,535	751	784	351
Heerapur	357	168	189	72
Sirikonda	2,582	1,282	1,300	547
Sunkidi	718	356	362	

== Villages ==
Ichoda Mandal consists of the following villages:

Adegaon-B, Adegaon-K, Boregaon, Chincholi, Dhabha, Dharampuri, Girjam, Gundala, Ichoda, Jamdi, Jamidi, Junni, Keshavpatnam, Kokasmannur, Malyal, Mankapur, Mokhra, Navegaon, Narsapur, Raiguda, Sirichalma, Soanpalle, and Talamadri.

== Transport ==
National Highway 44 (previously National Highway 7), the longest highway in India, passes through Ichoda, facilitating the road transport in the region. The mandal well connected to other parts of India by road. Hyderabad is located 275 km (171 mi) away. The nearest railway station is Adilabad about 33 km (21 mi) from Ichoda. The closest airport is Nagpur international airport 220 km (140 mi) away.

The nearest railway station in and around Ichoda

The following table shows other railway stations and its distance from Mamakudi.

Kinwat railway station 33.6 KM.

Saharsrakund railway station 46.4 KM.

Pimpalkhuti railway station 46.8 KM.

Himayatnagar railway station 61.0 KM.

Nearest airport to Ichoda

Ichoda‘s nearest airport is Nizamabad Airport situated at 91.9 KM distance. Few more airports around Ichoda are as follows.

Nizamabad Airport 91.9 KM.

Chandrapur Airport 102.5 KM.

Yavatmal Airport 110.5 KM.

Nearest districts to Ichoda

Ichoda is located around 29.4 kilometer away from its district head quarter adilabad. The other nearest district head quarters is nuapada situated at 42.4 KM distance from Ichoda . Surrounding districts from Ichoda are as follows.

Nizamabad ( nizamabad ) district 91.9 KM.

Chandrapur ( chandrapur ) district 106.9 KM.

Yavatmal ( yavatmal ) district 114.4 KM.

Nanded ( nanded ) district 125.1 KM.

Nearest town/city to Ichoda

Ichoda‘s nearest town/city/important place is Adilabad located at the distance of 27.0 kilometer. Surrounding town/city/TP/CT from Ichoda are as follows.

Adilabad 27.0 KM.

Kinwat 33.1 KM.

Nirmal 37.8 KM.

Bhainsa 61.2 KM.

Kallur 71.2 KM.

Ichoda nearest schools has been listed as follows.

Proposed Dental College Converted To School 25.7 KM.

St Joseph S Convent High School 27.8 KM.

C Ram Reddy High School 27.8 KM.

C Ram Reddy M School 28.2 KM.

Little Star School 28.3 KM.

Beaches in and around Ichoda

Ichoda‘s nearest beach is Ennore Beach located at the distance of 717.8 kilometers. Surrounding beaches from Ichoda are as follows.

Ennore Beach 717.8 KM.

Thiruvottiyur Beach 723.5 KM.

Marina Beach 735.5 KM.

Santhome Beach 738.5 KM.

Elliots Beach 740.7 KM.

== Education ==
- Vivekananda Junior and Degree College is a first Degree College in Ichoda Mandal. Established in 2006, under the management of Surukunti Sridhar Reddy and Surukunti Srinivas Reddy located 1 kilometers from the town providing education.
- Avanthi Junior college and Degree college.
- Sai Sammanth Junior & Degree College.
- Chatrapati junior and Degree College in Ichoda Mandal. Established in 2010, under the Management of

Shyam Sundher Reddy Located 200 Miters From the town Providing education.

=== Schools ===
- Al-Madina Urdu School – The first Urdu medium private school provides education as well as deeniyath and Arabic as special subjects.
- Pragathi Patashala Ichoda is one of the oldest schools in Ichoda.
- SR High School Ichoda E/M
- Zilla Parishad High School
- B.P.R.School Ichoda
- Saraswati Shishu Mandir
- Al Madina Urdu school
- Vivekananda High School E/M
- TTWR SCHOOL GIRLS E/M ECHODA
- TTWR Jr COLLEGE GIRLS E/M ECHODA
- TTWRURJC COLLEGE BOYS E/M ECHODA ( PRCL : A.RAJENDRA PRASAD, V.P : T.NAGESHWAR RAO )
- TTWR SCHOOL BOYS E/M
- First Step School Ichoda E/M
- SunShine School Ichoda E/M
- Golden leaf school Ichoda E/M

== Places of interest ==
Ichoda has more than twelve temples, five mosques and two churches. Ichoda Mandal headquarter has a primary health care center, State bank of Hyderabad, State Bank of India, Telangana Co-operative bank, and a Police Station. These facilities are primarily located in the southern part of the town.

- Kuntala Waterfall is 25.7 km from Ichoda.
- Kawal tiger reserve is 92.3 km from Ichoda.
- Pochera waterfalls is 19.2 km from Ichoda.
- Gnana Saraswati Temple, Basar also known as Basara Saraswathi Temple is 127.2 km from Ichoda.
- Jainadh Suryanarayan Swami Temple (4th-9th century) is 54 km from Ichoda.
- Sirchalma shivalayam (11th-12th century) 15 km from Ichoda.
- Gayatri waterfalls located 16 km from Ichoda(5 km trek from tarnam village).
