= Adelabad =

Adelabad (Persian: عادل اباد) may refer to:

- Adelabad, Chaharmahal and Bakhtiari
- Adelabad, Lorestan
- Adelabad, alternate name of Adlabad, Lorestan
- Adelabad, Razavi Khorasan
- Adelabad, Sistan and Baluchestan

== See also ==
- Adlabad (disambiguation)
- Adilabad (disambiguation)
