= Narnoor =

Coordinates: 19°23′39″N 78°47′08″E

Narnoor is a mandal located in the Adilabad district of the Indian state of Telangana.

== Sohelridersha ==
Narnoor Mandal consists of 24 Gramapanchayat. The village is in the agency area, which is headed under the Integrated Tribal Development Agency Utnoor. The mandal is divided into two more mandals, the second one being Gandiguda.

== Demographics ==
Telugu is the local language in the village. Total population of Narnoor is 3636 .Males are 1937 and Females are 1,699 living in 599 Houses. Total area of Narnoor is 750 hectares. Narnoor Local Language is Telugu. Narnoor town Total population is 5035 and number of houses are 889. Female Population is 45.4%. town literacy rate is 70.0% and the Female Literacy rate is 28.2%. Ninety percent of Narnoor Mandal residents are members of scheduled tribes, notably the Gonds, Kolams, Mahar, Buddhist and Lamabadie.

== Politics in Narnoor ==
TDP, TRS, CPI, INC are the major political parties in this area.

== Polling Stations /Booths near Narnoor ==
1)Narlapur 2)Narnoor 3)Narnoor 4)Bendara 5)Manik Guda H/o. Jhandaguda

== HOW TO REACH Narnoor ==
By Road : Adilabad is the Nearest Town to Narnoor. Adilabad is 66 km from Narnoor. Road connectivity is there from Adilabad to Narnoor.

By Rail : There is no railway station within 10 km of Narnoor. However there are railway stations from nearby the town Adilabad. Adilabad Rail Way Station, Umram Rail Way Station are the railway stations near to Adilabad. You can reach from Adilabad to Narnoor by road after .

== Govt Health Centers near Narnoor ==
1) Primary Health Centre, Narnoor, Near Police Station

2) Sub Centre, Narnoor, Near Ayurvedi Hospita

3) Sub Centre, Tadihatnoor, 14-Feb, Main Road, Anganiwadi Center (SC Wada)

== Geography ==
The mandal is located in forest area. A notable natural feature near the village is Kuntala Waterfall.

== Culture ==
The temple Sri Venkateswara Swamy Temple, also known as Mini Thirupathi, is located in Narnoor Mandal.
