= Lohara, Adilabad district =

Lohara is a village located in Adilabad mandal of Adilabad District in the India state of Telangana. Administratively, it is under Khandala Gram Panchayat.

== Demographics ==
As of 2011 census, the village of Lohara had a population of 677.
