= Khanapur, Telangana Assembly constituency =

Constituency of the Telangana legislative assembly in India

Coordinates: 19.04°N 78.65°E

Khanapur
- Constituency No. 6 for the Telangana Legislative Assembly
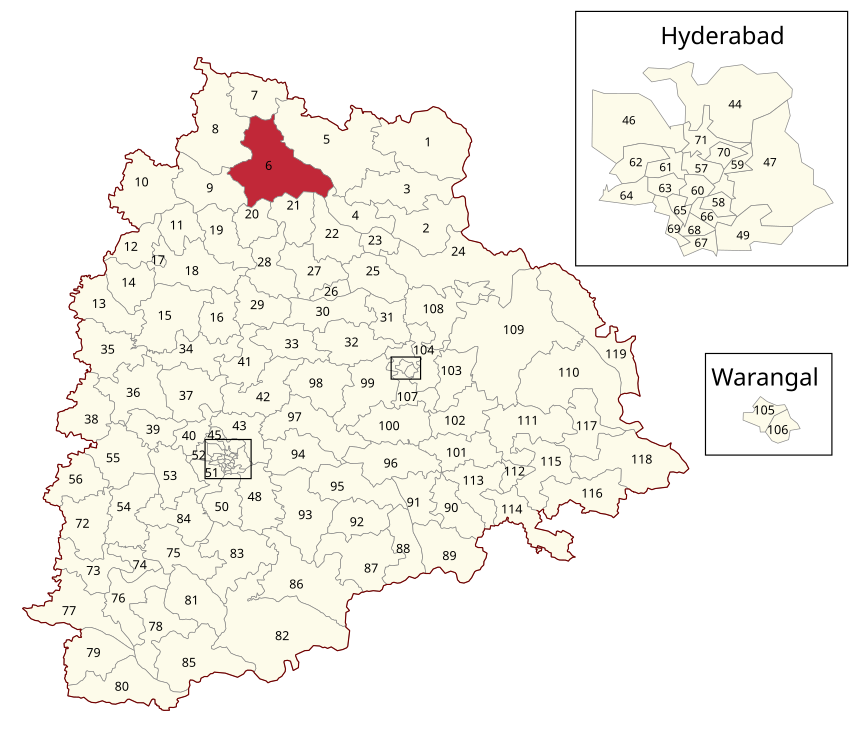
- Location of Khanapur Assembly constituency within Telangana

Constituency details
- Country: India
- Region: South India
- State: Telangana
- District: Adilabad
- Lok Sabha constituency: Adilabad
- Established: 1978
- Total electors: 1,83,298
- Reservation: ST

Member of Legislative Assembly
- 3rd Telangana Legislative Assembly
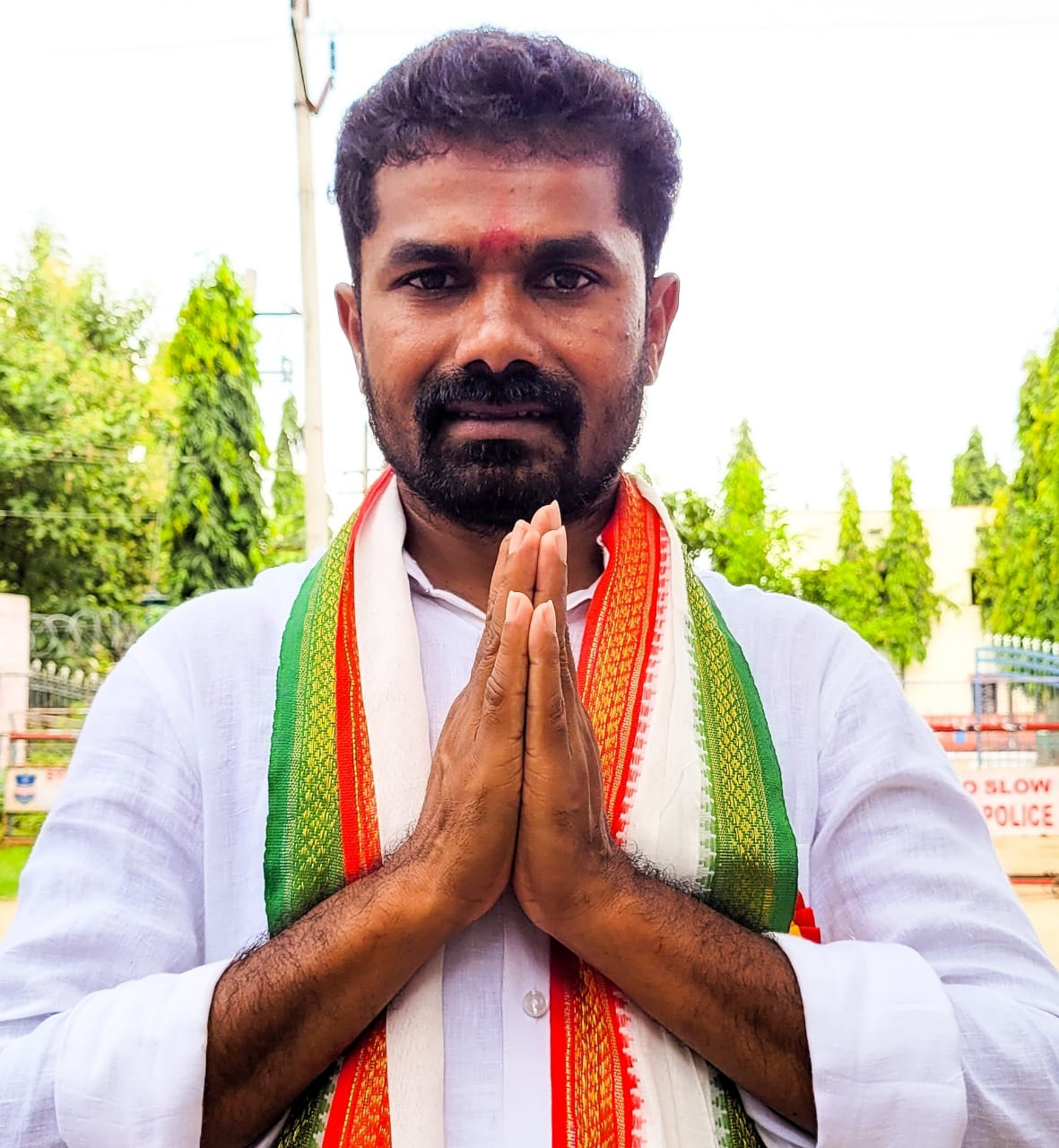
- Incumbent Vedma Bhojju
- Party: Indian National Congress
- Elected year: 2023

Khanapur is a constituency of Telangana Legislative Assembly, India. It is one of three constituencies in Nirmal district. It comes under Adilabad Lok Sabha constituency along with six other Assembly constituencies.

Ajmeera Rekha of Telangana Rashtra Samithi won the seat in the 2014 Assembly election.

== Mandals ==
The Assembly Constituency presently comprises the following Mandals:

Mandal	Districts
Khanapur	Nirmal
Jannaram	Mancherial
Inderavelly	Adilabad
Utnoor	Adilabad
Kaddam	Nirmal

== Members of the Legislative Assembly ==
Duration	Member	Political party
Andhra Pradesh
1978	Ambajee	Indian National Congress
1983	Ambajee	Indian National Congress
1985	Ajmera Govind Naik	Independent
1989	Kotnaka Bheem Rao	Indian National Congress
1994	Ajmeera Govind Naik	Telugu Desam Party
1999	Ramesh Rathod	Telugu Desam Party
2004	Ajmeera Govind Naik	Telangana Rashtra Samithi
2008 by-poll	Suman Ramesh Rathod	Telugu Desam Party
2009	Suman Ramesh Rathod	Telugu Desam Party
Telangana
2014	Ajmeera Rekha	Bharat Rashtra Samithi
2018	Ajmeera Rekha	Bharat Rashtra Samithi
2023	Vedma Bhojju	Indian National Congress

== Election results ==
=== Telangana Legislative Assembly election, 2023 ===
Telangana Assembly Elections, 2023: Khanapur
Party	Candidate	Votes	%	±%
INC	Vedma Bhojju	58,870	33.79	
BRS	Johnson Naik Bhukya	54,168	31.09	
BJP	Ramesh Rathod	52,398	30.07	
NOTA	None of the Above	2,114	1.21	
Majority		4,702	2.70	
Turnout		1,74,239		
INC gain from BRS		Swing		

=== Telangana Legislative Assembly election, 2018 ===
2018 Telangana Legislative Assembly election: Khanapur
Party	Candidate	Votes	%	±%
TRS	Ajmeera Rekha	67,138	44.12%	
INC	Ramesh Rathod	46,428	30.51%	
BJP	Ashok Satla	23,779	15.63%	
BSP	AJMEERA HARI NAIK	3,553	2.34%	
NOTA	None of the Above	2,776	1.82%	
Majority		20,710		
Turnout		1,52,156	80.87%	
TRS hold		Swing		

=== Telangana Legislative Assembly election, 2014 ===
2014 Telangana Legislative Assembly election: Khanapur
Party	Candidate	Votes	%	±%
TRS	Ajmeera Rekha	67,442	49.33%	
TDP	Rathod Ritesh	28,931	21.16%	
INC	Ajmeera Harinaik	26,087	19.08%	
Majority		38,511		
Turnout		1,36,717	74.59%	
TRS gain from TDP		Swing		

== See also ==
- List of constituencies of Telangana Legislative Assembly
