= Mallampet, Adilabad district =

Mallampet
- Village
- Location Telangana, India Mallampet (India)
- Coordinates: 19.0016°N 79.7906°E
- Country: India
- State: Telangana
- District: Adilabad
- Elevation: 142 m (466 ft)

Languages
  - Official: Telugu
- Time zone: UTC+5:30 (IST)
- PIN: 504 214
- Telephone code: +91–8737
- Vehicle registration: TS 01

Mallampet is a village located in Adilabad district of the Indian state of Telangana. It is located in Kotapalle mandal of the district.
