= Jogu Ramanna =

Indian politician

Member of Telangana Legislative Assembly
- In office (2014-2018), (2018 – 2023)
- Succeeded by: Payal Shankar
- Constituency: Adilabad

Member of Andhra Pradesh Legislative Assembly
- In office (2009-2012), (2012 – 2014)
- Preceded by: C. Ramchandra Reddy
- Constituency: Adilabad

Cabinet Minister Minister of Forest & Environment & Backward Classes Welfare
- In office 2 June 2014 – 12 December 2018

Personal details
- Born: 4 July 1963 (age 63) Deepaiguda, Jainad mandal, Adilabad District
- Party: Telangana Rashtra Samithi (from 2 June 2014)
- Other political affiliations: Telugu Desam Party (until 2 June 2014)
- Spouse: Jogu Rama
- Children: Jogu Premender, Jogu Mahender
- Parent: Jogu Ashanna
- Occupation: Politician

Jogu Ramanna Ashanna (born 4 July 1963) is an Indian politician who was the Minister of Forest and Environment & Backward Classes Welfare of Telangana from 2 June 2014 to 6 September 2018. He is a Member of the Telangana Legislative Assembly from Adilabad constituency since 2 June 2014. He was earlier a member of Telugu Desam Party. He is an M.L.A. from Adilabad assembly constituency from past four times 2018, 2014, 2012 by elections and 2009 also. He contested from Adilabad seat on BRS ticket in the 2023 Telangana Assembly Elections and lost the seat to BJP's Payal Shanker by 6,692 votes.

== Early life ==
Ramanna was born in Deepaiguda village of Adilabad district.

== Career ==
Ramanna started his political career as Sarpanch for Deepaiguda village. He served as MPTC for Jainath and ZPTC. He is a four-time M.L.A. from Adilabad assembly constituency. He raised a banner of revolt on Telangana statehood against party president Chandrababu Naidu by aligning himself with Nagam Janardhan Reddy.

He joined Telangana Rashtra Samithi on 10 October 2011 and in 2014 Telangana Assembly Election he was re-elected from Adilabad Assembly constituency. He was inducted into Cabinet on June 2, 2014, and became Forest Environment & BC Welfare Minister of Telangana.

== Personal life ==
He was married to Rama and has 2 sons.
