= Adlabad =

Adlabad (Persian: عدل اباد) may refer to:

- Adlabad, Lorestan

== See also ==
- Adelabad (disambiguation)
