= Indervelly, Adilabad district =

Indervelly
- Village
- Location in Telangana, India Indervelly (India)
- Coordinates: 19.4920104°N 78.6692762°E
- Country: India
- State: Telangana
- District: Adilabad

Languages
  - Official: Telugu
- Time zone: UTC+5:30 (IST)
- PIN: 504346
- Vehicle registration: TS

Indervelly is a village located in Adilabad district of the Indian state of Telangana. It is located in Indervelly mandal of Utnoor revenue division.

== Geography ==
Indervelly is located at 19.4920104°N 78.669262°E.

== History ==
In 1981, Ichoda was the site of a massacre incident in which police opened fire on a crowd of Gond Adivasis a tribal people. According to the Home Ministry report, 13 people were killed, and nine others were injured. However, witnesses claimed that more than 60 bodies were left at the scene. Other sources estimated higher casualties, the Andhra Civil Liberties Committee reported over 100 deaths, while the final was estimated by the Economic and Political Weekly is nearly 250 fatalities. The victims were primarily from the Gondi and Pardhan communities.

Under the Rythu Kooli Sangam, a memorial stupa of the martyrs was constructed at Indravelli. On March 19, 1986, unknown persons blew up this stupa. As a result of community pressure and tribal struggle, the stupa was rebuilt in 1987 with funds from Integrated tribal development agency Utnoor. Every year April 20 is observed as Adivasi Martyrs' Day
