= Raitu Coolie Sangham (Andhra Pradesh) =

Farmers Labourers League Andhra Pradesh రైతుకూలీ సంఘం (ఆంధ్రప్రదెౕశ్)
- Abbreviation: RCS (AP)
- President: Simhadrai Jhansi
- Secretary: Dantuluri Varma
- Founded: 14 June 1981
- Banned: 22 June 2009
- Ideology: Maoism
- Political position: Far Left

రైతుకూలీ సంఘం (ఆంధ్రప్రదెౕశ్)/ Raitu Coolie Sangham (Andhra Pradesh) (Farmers Labourers League (Andhra Pradesh)) is a revolutionary peasants' movement in the Indian state of Andhra Pradesh, related to the Communist Party of India (Marxist-Leninist). During its existence, the movement often found itself in trouble with the law and even being outlawed in India. The movement was also involved in the 1981 Indravelli massacre on the side of fellow Maoist organizations.

The secretary of the organization is Dantuluri Varma and the president Simhadrai Jhansi.
