= Ajmeera Rekha =

Indian politician and legislator

Member of Legislative Assembly, Telangana
- In office 2014–2023
- Preceded by: Suman Rathod
- Succeeded by: Vedma Bhojju
- Constituency: Khanapur

Personal details
- Born: 19 February 1974 (age 52) Hyderabad, India
- Party: Indian National Congress (since 2023)
- Other political affiliations: Bharat Rashtra Samithi (until 2023)
- Spouse: Ajmera Shyam Naik
- Education: LLB, Osmania University (2013); MA Sociology, Osmania University (2010); BA, Osmania University (1999)

Ajmeera Rekha Nayak (born 19 February 1974) is an Indian politician and a member of Telangana Legislature. She won as MLA from Khanapur in 2014 and 2018 on Telangana Rashtra Samithi ticket.

== Early life ==
She was born in Hyderabad, Telangana to K. Shankar Chauhan and K. Shyamala Bai. She schooled in Sanathnagar. Her father worked in BHEL and her mother was a state government employee. She did her BA at Vanita Mahavidyalaya and MA (sociology) at Osmania University in 2010. She completed her LLB at Padala Ram Reddy College in 2013.

== Career ==
She was a member of ZPTC. She lost as MLA in 2009 as an independent and won for the first time in 2014 on TRS ticket. She won again in 2018 Assembly elections with TRS ticket. She didn't get the BRS ticket for 2023 Assembly election. She resigned from the BRS party on 6 October.
