= Vedma Bhojju =

Indian politician from Telangana

Vedma Bhojju Patel
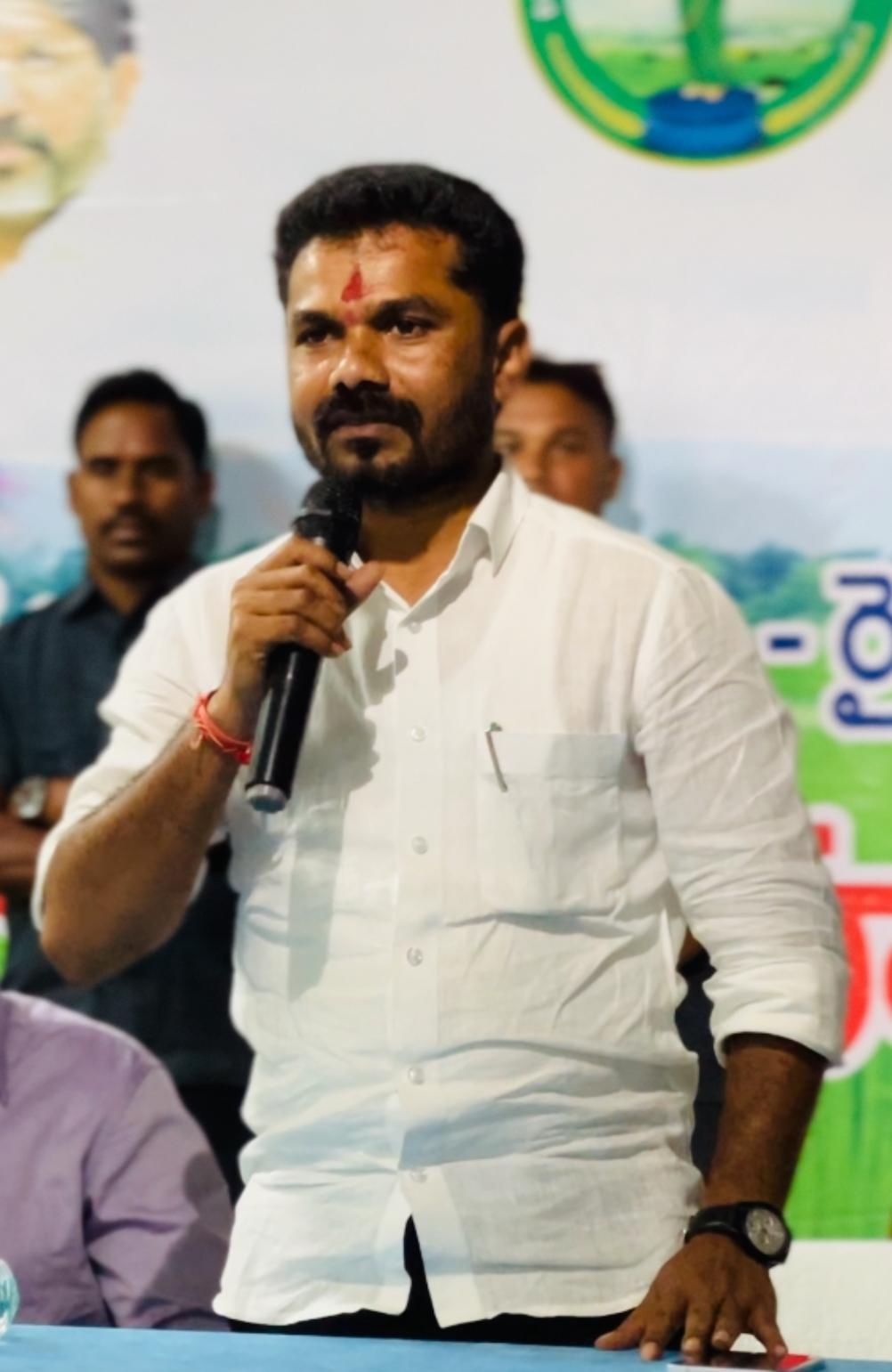

Member of the Telangana Legislative Assembly
- Incumbent
- Assumed office 2023
- Preceded by: Ajmeera Rekha
- Constituency: Khanapur

Personal details
- Born: Vedma Bhojju; 16 June 1986 (age 40) Kallurguda, Utnoor, Adilabad District, Telangana, India
- Party: Indian National Congress
- Children: 2
- Parents: Vedma Bhimrao (father); Girijabai (mother)
- Occupation: Politician

Vedma Bhojju is an Indian politician and tribal rights advocate from Telangana. He currently serves as the Member of the Telangana Legislative Assembly representing the Khanapur constituency. A member of the Indian National Congress, Bhojju is known for his commitment to rural development and the welfare of Adivasi communities.

Vedma Bhojju contested and won the 2023 Telangana Legislative Assembly elections, defeating the incumbent from the Khanapur constituency. Since taking office, he has focused on addressing local issues including forest rights, land ownership, and infrastructure development. He has been particularly active in improving road connectivity, education access, and livelihood opportunities for underserved communities across the region.

== Early life ==
Vedma Bhojju was born on June 16, 1986, to Vedma Bhimrao and Girijabai in Kallurguda, a tribal hamlet in Utnoor mandal, in the erstwhile Adilabad district of Telangana. He belongs to the Gond tribal community and resides in an Indiramma housing unit allocated under a state welfare scheme.

Bhojju completed his education at government institutions, earning a Bachelor of Arts, B.Ed., M.A., and LLB. He became active in the Adivasi Student Association and later contributed to grassroots mobilization through the Adivasi Rights Struggle Committee (Thudumdebba). In 2021, he resigned from his government contract job and formally joined the Indian National Congress in the presence of PCC President Revanth Reddy.

He was appointed as Telangana Pradesh Congress Committee (TPCC) General Secretary on 9 June 2025.

Bojju Was appointed as Nirmal District Congress Committee (DCC) President on 22 November 2025.
