= Dasnapur =

- Census Town
- Location in Telangana, India Dasnapur (India)
- Coordinates: 19°39′13″N 78°30′41″E
- Country: India
- State: Telangana
- District: Adilabad

Area
  - Total: 4.22 km^{2} (1.63 sq mi)

Population (2011)
  - Total: 22,216
  - Density: 5,260/km^{2} (13,600/sq mi)

Languages
  - Official: Telugu
- Time zone: UTC+5:30 (IST)
- Vehicle registration: TS
- Website: telangana.gov.in

Dasnapur is a census town in Adilabad district of the Indian state of Telangana.

== Demographics ==
As of 2001 India census, Dasnapur had a population of 19,962. Males constitute 49% of the population and females 51%. Dasnapur has an average literacy rate of 58%, lower than the national average of 59.5%: male literacy is 68% and, female literacy is 48%. In Dasnapur, 14% of the population is under 6 years of age.
