= Boath mandal =

Administrative division of Telangana, India

Boath
- Mandal
- Boath in Telangana, India Boath (India)
- Coordinates: 19°20′N 78°20′E
- Country: India
- State: Telangana
- Named for: Boath City

Government
  - Type: Municipal corporation
  - Body: Boath Municipal corporation, Boath Urban Development Authority
- Elevation: 453 m (1,486 ft)

Population (2005)
  - Total: 20,000
- Demonym: Boathilety
- Time zone: UTC+05:30 (IST)
- PIN: 504304
- Telephone code: 08751
- Website: telangana.gov.in

Boath or Bonthala (old name) is a mandal in Adilabad district of Telangana State, India.

Previously part of Hyderabad State and then Andhra Pradesh state, Boath became a part of the newly formed state of Telangana under the Andhra Pradesh Reorganisation Act, 2014. It is located about 271 km (168 mi) north of the state capital, Hyderabad.

== Geography ==
It has an average elevation of 418 meters (1374 feet).

== Demographics ==
According to the 2011 census of India, the demographic details of Boath mandal are as follows:

- Total population: 48,216 in 11,046 households
- Male population: 23,589; female population: 24,627
- Children under 6 years of age: 5,614 (2,869 boys and 2,745 girls)
- Total literates: 25,859

== Tourist attractions ==
- Kuntala Waterfall
- Pochara Waterfall
- Boath Project
- Sai Baba Temple
- Kailash Tekdi
