= Neradigonda mandal =

Neradigonda నేరడిగొండ నీరూరేటికుండ
- Mandal
- Location in Telangana, India Neradigonda (India)
- Coordinates: 19.3000°N 78.4000°E
- Country: India
- State: Telangana
- District: Adilabad
- Elevation: 422 m (1,385 ft)

Languages
  - Official: Telugu
- Time zone: UTC+5:30 (IST)
- Vehicle registration: TS-01
- Website: telangana.gov.in

Neradigonda or Neredikonda is a Mandal located in Adilabad district in the state of Telangana in India.

== Demographics ==
According to Indian census, 2001, the demographic details of Neradigonda manal is as follows:

- Total Population: 24,632 in 4,890 Households.
- Male Population: 12,396 and Female Population: 12,236
- Children Under 6-years of age: 4,387 (Boys - 2,231 and Girls - 2,156)
- Total Literates: 10,313

== Features ==
The villages in Neradigonda mandal includes: Bondidi, Boregaom, Buggaram, Koratkal, Kumari, Neradigonda, Rajura, Rolmamda, Tarnam, Tejapur, Venkatapur, Waddur, Wagdhari and Wankidi
