= Bela, Adilabad district =

Bela
- Town
- Location in Telangana, India Bela (India)
- Coordinates: 19.7189°N 78.76665°E
- Country: India
- State: Telangana
- District: Adilabad
- Founder: Chalukya Dynasty

Government
  - Type: Revenue Division (Taluka)

Population (2025)
  - Total: 13,200

MarathiLanguages
  - Marathi Official: Marathi, Telugu and Hindi languages
- Time zone: UTC+5:30 (IST)
- PIN: 504309
- Vehicle registration: TS01
- Website: telangana.gov.in

Bela is a town in Adilabad district, the northernmost district of the Indian state of Telangana. 72% of Bela residents follow Hinduism, 18% follow Islam and 8% follow Buddhism, Jainism and Christianity etc. In Bela town more than 60% speak Marathi language and 20% speak Telugu language and 10% speak Hindi and Urdu.

== Geography ==
Bela is located at 19.7189°N 78.76665°E.

== Administration ==
Bela is the northernmost town in Telangana, bordering Maharashtra. It serves as a Revenue Mandal headed by a Tahsildar, and the Bela MPDO (Mandal Parishad Development Officer) oversees numerous village panchayats.

The town’s administration is divided into several specialized sectors:

Forestry: The local forest area is managed by a Forest Range Officer.

Agriculture: The Agriculture Office manages all farming-related activities in the area.

Healthcare: A Civil Hospital provides medical treatment to the residents of Bela and its surrounding villages.

Politically, Bela is part of the Adilabad Assembly constituency, represented by MLA Payal Shankar. It also falls under the Adilabad Lok Sabha constituency, currently represented by Member of Parliament Godam Nagesh.

== See also ==
- List of mandals in Telangana
