= Gudihatnur, Adilabad district =

Gudihatnur
- Village
- Location in Telangana, India Gudihatnur (India)
- Coordinates: 19.5340346°N 78.4865954°E
- Country: India
- State: Telangana
- District: Adilabad

Population (2011)
  - Total: 6,265

Languages
  - Official: Telugu, Urdu
- Time zone: UTC+5:30 (IST)
- PIN: 504308
- Vehicle registration: TS

Gudihatnur is a mandal located in Adilabad district of the Indian state of Telangana. It is located in Gudihatnur mandal of Adilabad revenue division.

== Geography ==
Gudihatnur is located at 19.5340346°N 78.4865954°E.
