= Rajyadhikara Party =

- Abbreviation: AIRP
- Leader: VGR Naragoni
- President: VGR Naragoni
- Secretary: Salim Basha
- Founder: VGR NARAGONI
- Founded: 18 June 2007 (18 years ago)
- Headquarters: Flat no.205, Hi Line Complex, Road Number.12, Banjara Hills, Hyderabad, Telangana, India - 500034
- Ideology: Equal Justice; Human rights Social equality
- Political position: Centre-left
- ECI Status: Registered Party

Website
- www.rajyadhikaraparty.com

The Rajyadhikara Party is a political party, comprising BC, SC, ST and Minorities established in 2007, India by V. G. R. Naragoni as its national president. And its National Vice President is Shaik Ismail. The Party was formed mainly to represent and empower the Bahujans (literally meaning "People in majority"), referring to people from the Scheduled Castes, Scheduled Tribes and Other Backward Castes (OBC), as well as religious Minorities that together consist of 85% of India's population

The party claims to be inspired by the philosophy of B. R. Ambedkar, Mahatma Jyotiba Phule, Sir Syed Ahmed Khan and Kanshi Ram.

== Party history ==
Even after India attaining Independence from the British Raj in 1947, India is governed till today either by Indian National Congress or Bharatiya Janata Party, dominated by some upper castes (15% of population), or by only one family for a long time. This created a wide disparity in Socio-Economical development between Forward Caste and Backward Classes in India. Backward Classes, comprising 52% of population (consisting of 94 castes), neither came to power by floating a political parties before nor democratically elected member of Backward Classes community was allowed to become the prime minister of India through Indian National Congress or Bharatiya Janata Party. In fact, 85% of India's Backward Classes do not have any representation in either of Indian Parliament (Loksabha and Rajya Sabha). VGR Naragoni floated a party Rajyadhikara Party way back in 2007 to represent BC, SC, ST and Minorities to achieve political power to bring social, political, and economical developments to the backward and weaker sections of the Indian states.

=== Strategy ===
The Rajyadhikara Party (AIRP) was founded on 18 June 2007 by VGR Naragoni with the inspiration of sri Kanshiramji and with the vision of B. R. Ambedkar, Mahatma Jyotiba Phule, and Sir Syed Ahmed Khan

Speaking of lesser-known figures from the Indian Rebellion of 1857 who have been used as Dalit icons, the social scientist Badri Narayan Tiwari has noted that

Dalit intellectuals supported by AIRP, which is trying to mobilise grassroot Dalits using local heroes, histories, myths and legends found a wealth of resources in the oral history of the regions of [India] centering around the 1857 rebellion. The political strategy of the party is to tell and retell the stories of these heroes, build memorials and organize celebrations around their stories repeatedly to build a collective memory in the psyche of the people. The stories are narrated in such a manner that the Dalits imagine the story of the making of this nation in which they played a significant role.

== Party aims ==
The party aims in equal political and proportionate representation to all classes and caste of the people discarding the differences between the communities and religions in India to achieve Equal Justice, Human rights and Social equality which is dream of Dr Baba Saheb Ambedkar. The Party is working with vision of Dr.BR Ambedkar saheb and Manyashri Kanshiramji to achieve the political power in the proportion of the population of the castes and communities. Since most of the BC, SC and ST are residing in villages and rural areas engaged as agricultural labour, more emphasis to be given on Villages particularly on Agriculture. Also the literacy percent is comparatively less in these communities much more emphasis has to be given on these issues. The party will work on these by achieving Rajyadhikar.
