= Payal Shankar =

Indian politician

Member of Telangana Legislative Assembly
- Incumbent
- Assumed office December 2023
- Preceded by: Jogu Ramanna
- Constituency: Adilabad

Personal details
- Born: Ade, Jainath
- Party: Bharatiya Janta Party
- Other political affiliations: Telugu Desam Party
- Children: Sharath
- Occupation: Politician

Payal Adellu Shankar is an Indian politician. He was born in the Indian state of Telangana.

== Early life ==
He is originally from Ada village in jainath mandal of Adilabad district.

== Career ==
He initiated his political journey with the Telugu Desam Party.

In the 2011 by-election, Shankar contested as a representative of the Telugu Desam Party but was defeated. Subsequently, he transitioned to BJP. Standing as a BJP candidate in two consecutive elections, he faced competition from Jogu Ramanna of the Telangana Rashtra Samithi (TRS) party. Shankar emerged victorious with a majority of 6147 votes, overcoming the challenges posed by Ramanna, who had previously defeated him thrice.

In the 2023 assembly elections, he secured victory as a Bharatiya Janata Party (BJP) candidate, earning the position of MLA for the Adilabad constituency. Payal Shankar was appointed BJP Legislature Party deputy floor leader on 14 February 2024.
