= Utnoor =

- Census Town
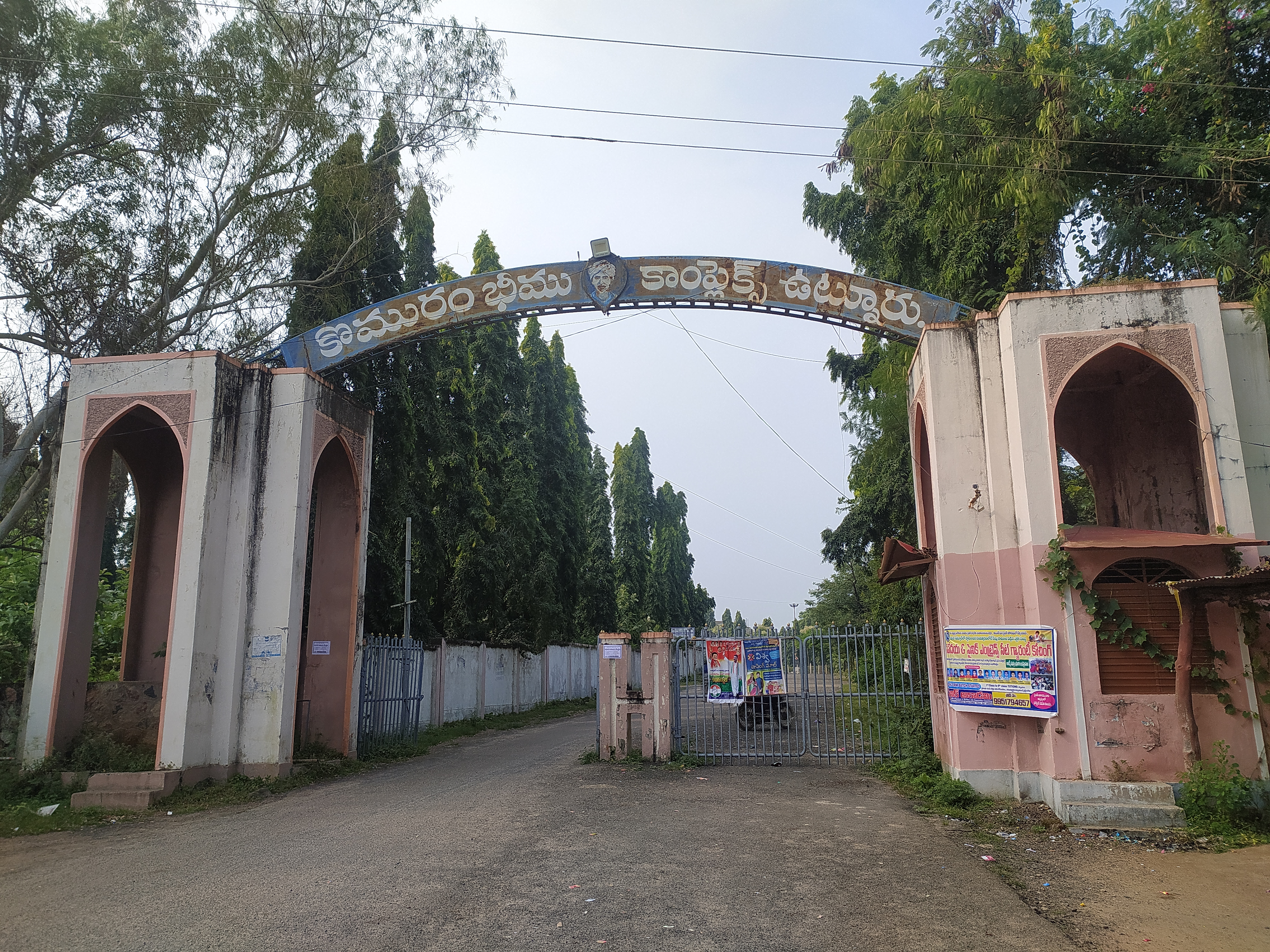
- Kumuram bheem complex at Utnoor

- Location in Telangana, India Utnoor (India)
- Coordinates: 19.3667°N 78.7667°E
- Country: India
- State: Telangana
- District: Adilabad

Government
  - Type: State government
  - Body: Nagara Panchayathi

Area
  - Total: 13.65 km^{2} (5.27 sq mi)

Population (2011)
  - Total: 16,005
  - Density: 1,173/km^{2} (3,037/sq mi)
- Demonym: Utnuri

Languages
  - Official: Telugu
- Time zone: UTC+5:30 (IST)
- PIN: 504311
- Vehicle registration: TG–01

Utnoor, is a census town located in Adilabad district of the Indian state of Telangana. It is known for the Neolithic excavations. It is one of the revenue divisions of Utnoor and Adilabad in Adilabad district.

Utnoor falls under the Khanapur constituency (ST). The present MLA is Vedma Bhojju from the Indian National Congress.

== Educational institutions ==
Utnoor has the following educational institutes:

- Eklavya Model Residential School, Utnoor. (governed by NESTS, Ministry of Tribal Education, Govt. of India.)
- Kasturba Gandhi Balika Vidyalaya, Utnoor
- Zilla Parishad Secondary School, Utnoor
- Pulaji Baba School, Utnoor
- TTWRJC, Utnoor
- A government junior and degree college

== Tourism ==
Utnoor has several tourist destinations in the Adilabad district such as

- Mitte waterfall
- Kadem Project
- Kawal Tiger Reserve

These sites are accessible via the direct Telangana State Road Transport Corporation (TGSRTC) buses from Hyderabad to Utnoor.

While there is no railway station within 10 km of Utnoor, the closest railway station is in Adilabad, from which one can travel by road.
