= Tamsi mandal =

Tamsi
- mandal
- Location in Telangana, India Tamsi (India)
- Coordinates: 19.6833°N 78.4167°E
- Country: India
- State: Telangana
- District: Adilabad
- Elevation: 293 m (961 ft)

Languages
  - Official: Telugu
- Time zone: UTC+5:30 (IST)
- PIN: 504312
- Vehicle registration: TS-01
- Website: telangana.gov.in

Tamsi is a mandal located in Adilabad district in the Indian state of Telangana.

== Demographics ==
According to Indian census, 2011, the demographic details of Tamsi mandal is as follows:

- Total Population: 39,631 in 9,184 Households.
- Male Population: 19,615 and Female Population: 20,016
- Children Under 6-years of age: 5,506 (Boys -2,772 and Girls - 2,734)
- Total Literates: 15,000

Tamsi village has a population of 2,925 (B) and 899 (K) in 2001.

== Villages ==
The villages in Tamsi mandal includes: Andarbandh, Antargaon, Arli, Bandal Nagpur, Belsari Rampur, Bheempoor, Dhanora, Ghotkuri, Girigaon, Gomutri, Gona, Hasnapur, Jamidi, Karanji, Khapperla, Nippani, Pippalkoti, Ponnari, Tamsi, Waddadi, Wadgaon and Wadoor.
