= Adelabad, Lorestan =

Adelabad عادل اباد
- village
- Location within Iran
- Coordinates: 33°52′22″N 48°15′55″E
- Country: Iran
- Province: Lorestan
- County: Selseleh
- Bakhsh: Central
- Rural District: Honam

Population (2006)
  - Total: 65
- Time zone: UTC+3:30 (IRST)
  - Summer (DST): UTC+4:30 (IRDT)

Adelabad (Persian: عادل اباد, also Romanized as ‘Ādelābād) is a village in Honam Rural District, within the Central District of Selseleh County, Lorestan Province, Iran. At the 2006 census, its population was 65, in 18 families.
