= Kuntala Waterfall =

Waterfalls on Kadam river in Telangana, India

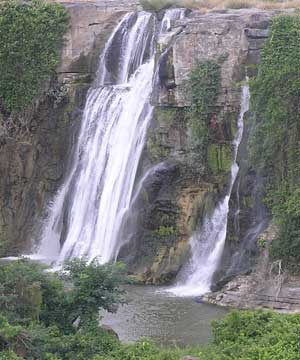
- Kuntala waterfalls

- Location within Telangana Location within India
- Location: Kuntala, Adilabad district, Telangana
- Coordinates: 19.285°N 78.503°E
- Type: Waterfall
- Total height: 150 m (490 ft)

Kuntala Waterfall is a waterfall of Telangana state in India, located on Kadam river in Neradigonda mandal of Adilabad district. It is the highest waterfall in the state with a height of 150 feet.

There is a story behind the name of this waterfall as 'Kuntala'. It is said that Dusyanthu's wife Shakuntala was mesmerized by the beauty of nature here and she used to bathe in this waterfall all the time. Locals say that the name of 'Shakuntala' has changed to 'Kuntala'.

These waterfalls are in the dense forests inhabited by the Gonds. Kunta in Gondi and Telugu means pond. Kuntalu means several ponds. The waterfall originates from a confluence of several ponds that lead to the river Kadem.

Formed by the Kadam River, Kuntala falls cascade down through two steps and can be seen as two separate adjacent falls after the peak rains. It is one of the famous one day outings from Hyderabad. There is a motorable road until the entry point of the falls, from where steps are available to reach the bottom of the falls. The falls are about 10 minutes (one way) walk from the entry point.

== Transportation ==
Public transport is available up to Kuntala waterfalls from Hyderabad with pick up points at MGBS, JBS, BOWENPALLY, SUCHITRA, and KOMPALLY. Service is provided by Telangana State Road Transport Corporation on Saturdays and Sundays. The TSRTC services commenced on Marth 9th, 2022. Bus facility is also available from Nizamabad, Adilabad, and Nirmal Bus Stations every Sunday. Service numbers are 99969 (Express bus) from Nizamabad which starts at 8am every Sunday, and service number 77099 which starts from Adilabad bus station at 8am every Sunday. Nirmal and Adilabad are base stations. The nearest Railway station is Adilabad, from Hyderabad Krishna Express will reach. Other waterfalls in the area include Gayatri Waterfalls and Pochera Falls.

== See also ==
- List of waterfalls
- List of waterfalls in India
