= Adilabad Assembly constituency =

Constituency of the Telangana legislative assembly in India

Coordinates: 19.50°N 78.70°E

Adilabad
- Constituency No. 7 for the Telangana Legislative Assembly
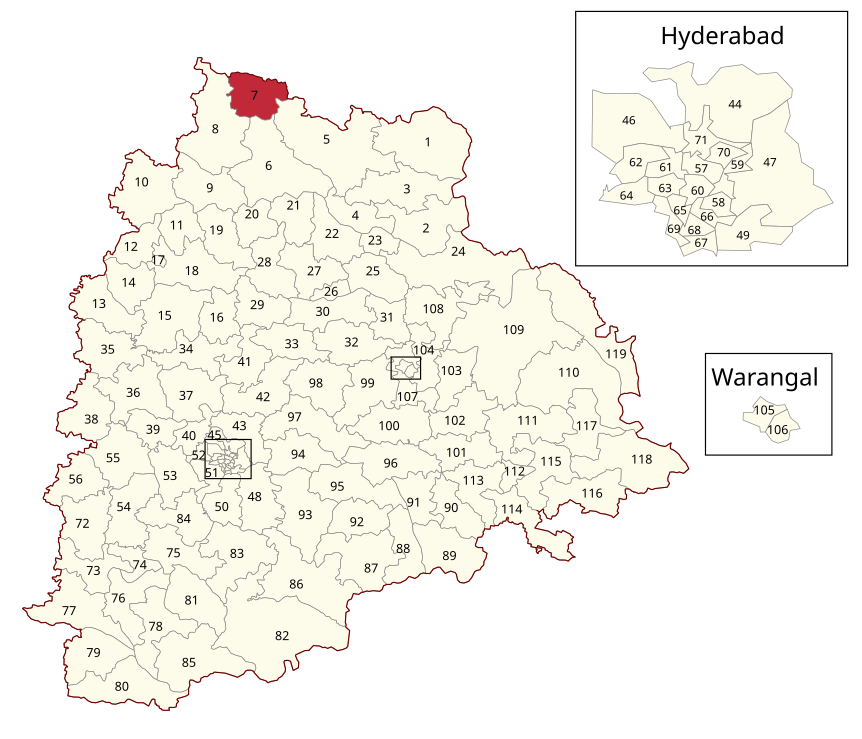
- Location of Adilabad Assembly constituency within Telangana

Constituency details
- Country: India
- Region: South India
- State: Telangana
- District: Adilabad
- Lok Sabha constituency: Adilabad
- Established: 1951
- Total electors: 1,86,348
- Reservation: None

Member of Legislative Assembly
- 3rd Telangana Legislative Assembly
- Incumbent Payal Shankar
- Party: Bharatiya Janata Party
- Elected year: 2023

Adilabad is a constituency of the Telangana Legislative Assembly, India. It is one of the two constituencies in Adilabad district, Telangana. It comes under Adilabad Lok Sabha constituency along with six other assembly constituencies. The current MLA is Payal Shankar.

== Mandals ==
The assembly constituency presently comprises the following mandals:

Mandal
Adilabad
Jainad
Bela

== Members of the Legislative Assembly ==
| Election | Member | Party |
|---|---|---|
| 1952 | Daji Shanker Rao | People's Democratic Front |
| 1957 | Rangnath Rao | People's Democratic Front |
| 1962 | Vithal Rao | Independent politician |
| 1967 | K. Ramkishtoo | Communist Party of India |
| 1972 | Masood Ahmed | Indian National Congress |
| 1978 | Chilkuri Ramchandra Reddy | Independent politician |
| 1983 | Chilkuri Vaman Reddy | Independent politician |
| 1985 | Chilkuri Ramchandra Reddy | Independent politician |
| 1989 | Chilkuri Ramchandra Reddy | Indian National Congress |
| 1994 | Chilkuri Vaman Reddy | Telugu Desam Party |
| 1999 | Padala Bhumanna | Telugu Desam Party |
| 2004 | Chilkuri Ramchandra Reddy | Indian National Congress |
| 2009 | Jogu Ramanna | Telugu Desam Party |
| 2012 By-election | Jogu Ramanna | Bharat Rashtra Samithi |
| 2014 | Jogu Ramanna | Bharat Rashtra Samithi |
| 2018 | Jogu Ramanna | Bharat Rashtra Samithi |
| 2023 | Payal Shankar | Bharatiya Janata Party |

== Election results ==
=== Assembly Election 2023 ===
2023 Telangana Legislative Assembly election : Adilabad
| Party | Candidate | Votes | % | ±% |
|---|---|---|---|---|
| BJP | Payal Shankar | 67,608 | 35.84% | ▲7.02 |
| BRS | Jogu Ramanna | 60,916 | 32.29% | New |
| INC | Kandi Srinivasa Reddy | 47,724 | 25.30% | ▲5.74 |
| Independent | Alluri Sanjeeva Reddy | 1,946 | 1.03% | New |
| Independent | Aslam | 1,391 | 0.74% | New |
| Independent | Kalamadugu Vijay Kumar | 1,173 | 0.62% | New |
| NOTA | None of the above | 592 | 0.31% | ▼0.39 |
| Margin of victory | | 6,692 | 3.55% | ▼12.61 |
| Turnout | | 188,956 | 78.55% | ▼3.86 |
| Total valid votes | | 188,652 | | |
| Registered electors | | 240,559 | | ▲19.51 |
| BJP gain from BRS | | Swing | ▼9.14 | |

=== Assembly Election 2018 ===
2018 Telangana Legislative Assembly election : Adilabad
| Party | Candidate | Votes | % | ±% |
|---|---|---|---|---|
| BRS | Jogu Ramanna | 74,050 | 44.98% | ▲3.82 |
| BJP | Payal Shankar | 47,444 | 28.82% | ▼2.03 |
| INC | Gandrath Sujatha | 32,200 | 19.56% | ▼1.68 |
| Rajyadhikara Party | Kothapelly Narayana | 4,125 | 2.51% | New |
| BSP | Eerla Satyanarayana | 1,352 | 0.82% | ▼0.37 |
| NOTA | None of the above | 1,149 | 0.70% | ▲0.09 |
| Margin of victory | | 26,606 | 16.16% | ▲5.84 |
| Turnout | | 165,887 | 82.41% | ▲17.35 |
| Total valid votes | | 164,644 | | |
| Registered electors | | 201,294 | | ▼9.84 |
| BRS hold | | Swing | ▲3.82 | |

=== Assembly Election 2014 ===
2014 Andhra Pradesh Legislative Assembly election : Adilabad
| Party | Candidate | Votes | % | ±% |
|---|---|---|---|---|
| BRS | Jogu Ramanna | 58,705 | 41.16% | ▼8.18 |
| BJP | Payal Shankar | 43,994 | 30.85% | New |
| INC | Bhargav Deshpande | 30,298 | 21.24% | ▼2.04 |
| Mahajana Socialist Party | Islamuddin | 2,878 | 2.02% | New |
| BSP | Bhuma Reddy Patil | 1,701 | 1.19% | New |
| CPI(M) | Lanka Raghavulu | 1,120 | 0.79% | ▼1.22 |
| NOTA | None of the above | 864 | 0.61% | New |
| Margin of victory | | 14,711 | 10.32% | ▼15.73 |
| Turnout | | 145,260 | 65.06% | ▼4.95 |
| Total valid votes | | 142,615 | | |
| Registered electors | | 223,262 | | ▲29.70 |
| BRS hold | | Swing | ▼8.18 | |

=== Assembly By-election 2012 ===
2012 Andhra Pradesh Legislative Assembly by-election : Adilabad
| Party | Candidate | Votes | % | ±% |
|---|---|---|---|---|
| BRS | Jogu Ramanna | 59,452 | 49.34% | New |
| INC | Chilkuri Ramchandra Reddy | 28,056 | 23.28% | ▼7.30 |
| TDP | Payal Shankar | 24,288 | 20.16% | ▼31.77 |
| Independent | Ayyub | 3,961 | 3.29% | New |
| CPI(M) | Lanka Raghavulu | 2,423 | 2.01% | New |
| Independent | P. Vishal | 2,322 | 1.93% | New |
| Margin of victory | | 31,396 | 26.05% | ▲4.71 |
| Turnout | | 120,502 | 70.01% | ▲2.41 |
| Total valid votes | | 120,502 | | |
| Registered electors | | 172,131 | | ▼3.16 |
| BRS gain from TDP | | Swing | ▼2.59 | |

=== Assembly Election 2009 ===
2009 Andhra Pradesh Legislative Assembly election : Adilabad
| Party | Candidate | Votes | % | ±% |
|---|---|---|---|---|
| TDP | Jogu Ramanna | 62,235 | 51.93% | ▲12.35 |
| INC | Chilkuri Ramchandra Reddy | 36,655 | 30.58% | ▼23.32 |
| Independent | Chityala Suhasini | 7,006 | 5.85% | New |
| BJP | Nivedita Vaze | 3,396 | 2.83% | New |
| PRP | Chilkuri Thirupathi | 3,248 | 2.71% | New |
| Independent | Chandu (Challa Chandra Mohan) | 2,398 | 2.00% | New |
| BSP | Gaddala Shankar | 1,638 | 1.37% | ▼0.47 |
| Independent | Sayyed Javeedshah | 1,151 | 0.96% | New |
| Margin of victory | | 25,580 | 21.34% | ▲7.02 |
| Turnout | | 120,161 | 67.60% | ▼4.05 |
| Total valid votes | | 119,852 | | |
| Registered electors | | 177,743 | | ▼8.12 |
| TDP gain from INC | | Swing | ▼1.97 | |

=== Assembly Election 2004 ===
2004 Andhra Pradesh Legislative Assembly election : Adilabad
| Party | Candidate | Votes | % | ±% |
|---|---|---|---|---|
| INC | Chilkuri Ramchandra Reddy | 74,675 | 53.90% | ▲40.47 |
| TDP | Jogu Ramanna | 54,838 | 39.58% | ▼14.24 |
| Independent | Nakka Vijay Kumar | 2,758 | 1.99% | New |
| Independent | D. Pedda Pochanna | 2,672 | 1.93% | New |
| BSP | Mekala Mallanna | 2,546 | 1.84% | New |
| Peoples Republican Party | Dayanand Gaikwad | 1,515 | 1.09% | New |
| Margin of victory | | 19,837 | 14.32% | ▼14.83 |
| Turnout | | 138,617 | 71.65% | ▲2.17 |
| Total valid votes | | 138,537 | | |
| Rejected ballots | | 80 | 0.06% | ▼4.34 |
| Registered electors | | 193,461 | | ▲6.32 |
| INC gain from TDP | | Swing | ▲0.08 | |

=== Assembly Election 1999 ===
1999 Andhra Pradesh Legislative Assembly election : Adilabad
| Party | Candidate | Votes | % | ±% |
|---|---|---|---|---|
| TDP | Padala Bhumanna | 65,054 | 53.82% | ▲17.72 |
| Independent | Chilkuri Ramchandra Reddy | 29,828 | 24.68% | New |
| INC | Gandrath Sujatha | 16,232 | 13.43% | ▼7.06 |
| CPI | A. A. Raheem | 6,524 | 5.40% | New |
| Independent | Rokandla Ramesh | 1,702 | 1.41% | New |
| Marxist Communist Party of India (S.S.Srivastava) | Perelli Radha | 1,159 | 0.96% | New |
| Margin of victory | | 35,226 | 29.15% | ▲24.36 |
| Turnout | | 126,424 | 69.48% | ▼1.17 |
| Total valid votes | | 120,863 | | |
| Rejected ballots | | 5,561 | 4.40% | ▲1.51 |
| Registered electors | | 181,961 | | ▲13.43 |
| TDP hold | | Swing | ▲17.72 | |

=== Assembly Election 1994 ===
1994 Andhra Pradesh Legislative Assembly election : Adilabad
| Party | Candidate | Votes | % | ±% |
|---|---|---|---|---|
| TDP | Chilkuri Vaman Reddy | 39,729 | 36.10% | ▼6.45 |
| Independent | Padala Bhumanna | 34,455 | 31.31% | New |
| INC | Chilkuri Ramchandra Reddy | 22,550 | 20.49% | ▼33.64 |
| BSP | Madavi Raju | 6,142 | 5.58% | New |
| BJP | Alluri Narayana Reddy | 4,026 | 3.66% | New |
| AIMIM | Syed Siraj Quadri | 1,526 | 1.39% | ▼0.49 |
| Independent | Arsha Ramulu | 1,276 | 1.16% | New |
| Margin of victory | | 5,274 | 4.79% | ▼6.79 |
| Turnout | | 113,331 | 70.65% | ▼0.90 |
| Total valid votes | | 110,061 | | |
| Rejected ballots | | 3,270 | 2.89% | ▼1.68 |
| Registered electors | | 160,415 | | ▲21.31 |
| TDP gain from INC | | Swing | ▼18.03 | |

=== Assembly Election 1989 ===
1989 Andhra Pradesh Legislative Assembly election : Adilabad
| Party | Candidate | Votes | % | ±% |
|---|---|---|---|---|
| INC | Chilkuri Ramchandra Reddy | 48,868 | 54.13% | ▲48.69 |
| TDP | Kunta Chandrakanth Reddy | 38,416 | 42.55% | ▲1.35 |
| AIMIM | Farooq Ahmed | 1,698 | 1.88% | New |
| Independent | Jangepalli Lingaiah | 1,304 | 1.44% | New |
| Margin of victory | | 10,452 | 11.58% | ▲2.75 |
| Turnout | | 94,609 | 71.55% | ▲3.25 |
| Total valid votes | | 90,286 | | |
| Rejected ballots | | 4,323 | 4.57% | ▲1.84 |
| Registered electors | | 132,237 | | ▲21.53 |
| INC gain from Independent | | Swing | ▲4.10 | |

=== Assembly Election 1985 ===
1985 Andhra Pradesh Legislative Assembly election : Adilabad
| Party | Candidate | Votes | % | ±% |
|---|---|---|---|---|
| Independent | Chilkuri Ramchandra Reddy | 36,170 | 50.03% | New |
| TDP | Ranginei Laxman Rao | 29,785 | 41.20% | New |
| INC | Patil Digamber | 3,934 | 5.44% | ▼35.78 |
| Independent | Akther Hussain | 1,522 | 2.11% | New |
| Margin of victory | | 6,385 | 8.83% | ▲8.03 |
| Turnout | | 74,323 | 68.30% | ▲2.34 |
| Total valid votes | | 72,292 | | |
| Rejected ballots | | 2,031 | 2.73% | ▼1.19 |
| Registered electors | | 108,814 | | ▲7.81 |
| Independent hold | | Swing | ▲8.02 | |

=== Assembly Election 1983 ===
1983 Andhra Pradesh Legislative Assembly election : Adilabad
| Party | Candidate | Votes | % | ±% |
|---|---|---|---|---|
| Independent | Chilkuri Vaman Reddy | 26,871 | 42.01% | New |
| INC | Chilkuri Ramchandra Reddy | 26,362 | 41.22% | ▲33.71 |
| Independent | Akther Hussain | 3,859 | 6.03% | New |
| Independent | P. Vasu Dev | 2,018 | 3.15% | New |
| Independent | Nasani Lachanna | 1,943 | 3.04% | New |
| JP | Rasheed Ahmed | 1,432 | 2.24% | ▼5.20 |
| Independent | Potha Reddy | 932 | 1.46% | New |
| Independent | J. Lingiah | 545 | 0.85% | New |
| Margin of victory | | 509 | 0.80% | ▼12.39 |
| Turnout | | 66,572 | 65.96% | ▼12.29 |
| Total valid votes | | 63,962 | | |
| Rejected ballots | | 2,610 | 3.92% | ▼0.89 |
| Registered electors | | 100,935 | | ▲15.41 |
| Independent hold | | Swing | ▼2.36 | |

=== Assembly Election 1978 ===
1978 Andhra Pradesh Legislative Assembly election : Adilabad
| Party | Candidate | Votes | % | ±% |
|---|---|---|---|---|
| Independent | Chilkuri Ramchandra Reddy | 28,905 | 44.37% | New |
| INC(I) | Chilkuri Vaman Reddy | 20,313 | 31.18% | New |
| Independent | Pendor Bapu Rrao | 5,137 | 7.89% | New |
| INC | Masood Ahmsd Khursheed | 4,894 | 7.51% | ▼55.98 |
| JP | Syed Mudakkir Shah | 4,846 | 7.44% | New |
| Independent | Vugge Namdev | 1,048 | 1.61% | New |
| Margin of victory | | 8,592 | 13.19% | ▼28.10 |
| Turnout | | 68,436 | 78.25% | ▲9.87 |
| Total valid votes | | 65,143 | | |
| Rejected ballots | | 3,293 | 4.81% | ▲4.81 |
| Registered electors | | 87,461 | | ▲16.02 |
| Independent gain from INC | | Swing | ▼19.12 | |

=== Assembly Election 1972 ===
1972 Andhra Pradesh Legislative Assembly election : Adilabad
| Party | Candidate | Votes | % | ±% |
|---|---|---|---|---|
| INC | Masood Ahmed | 30,918 | 63.49% | ▲22.99 |
| Independent | Bhagwan Rao | 10,810 | 22.20% | New |
| CPI | Shankar Rao | 5,313 | 10.91% | ▼32.39 |
| RPI(K) | Gantala Pedda Bhumanna | 1,660 | 3.41% | New |
| Margin of victory | | 20,108 | 41.29% | ▲38.50 |
| Turnout | | 51,549 | 68.38% | ▼0.03 |
| Total valid votes | | 48,701 | | |
| Registered electors | | 75,384 | | ▲16.42 |
| INC gain from CPI | | Swing | ▲20.19 | |

=== Assembly Election 1967 ===
1967 Andhra Pradesh Legislative Assembly election : Adilabad
| Party | Candidate | Votes | % | ±% |
|---|---|---|---|---|
| CPI | K. Ramkishtoo | 17,881 | 43.30% | ▲8.12 |
| INC | A. V. Ramanna | 16,727 | 40.50% | ▲13.73 |
| ABJS | V. Doctor | 3,594 | 8.70% | New |
| RPI | S. Kachruji | 3,096 | 7.50% | New |
| Margin of victory | | 1,154 | 2.79% | ▼0.09 |
| Turnout | | 44,296 | 68.41% | ▲3.68 |
| Total valid votes | | 41,298 | | |
| Registered electors | | 64,753 | | ▲8.82 |
| CPI gain from Independent | | Swing | ▲5.25 | |

=== Assembly Election 1962 ===
1962 Andhra Pradesh Legislative Assembly election : Adilabad
| Party | Candidate | Votes | % | ±% |
|---|---|---|---|---|
| Independent | Vithal Rao | 13,949 | 38.05% | New |
| CPI | Kastal Ram Kishtoo | 12,895 | 35.18% | New |
| INC | K. Ashanna | 9,811 | 26.77% | ▼22.66 |
| Margin of victory | | 1,054 | 2.88% | ▲1.74 |
| Turnout | | 38,517 | 64.73% | ▲10.41 |
| Total valid votes | | 36,655 | | |
| Registered electors | | 59,503 | | ▲7.33 |
| Independent gain from PDF | | Swing | ▼12.52 | |

=== Assembly Election 1957 ===
1957 Andhra Pradesh Legislative Assembly election : Adilabad
| Party | Candidate | Votes | % | ±% |
|---|---|---|---|---|
| PDF | Rangnath Rao | 15,230 | 50.57% | ▼16.18 |
| INC | Bhoja Reddy | 14,888 | 49.43% | ▲22.59 |
| Margin of victory | | 342 | 1.14% | ▼38.77 |
| Turnout | | 30,118 | 54.32% | ▲1.80 |
| Total valid votes | | 30,118 | | |
| Registered electors | | 55,441 | | ▲4.95 |
| PDF hold | | Swing | ▼16.18 | |

=== Assembly Election 1952 ===
1952 Hyderabad State Legislative Assembly election : Adilabad
| Party | Candidate | Votes | % | ±% |
|---|---|---|---|---|
| PDF | Daji Shanker Rao | 18,519 | 66.75% | New |
| INC | Ramchander Rao | 7,447 | 26.84% | New |
| SP | Balkrishan Rao | 1,777 | 6.41% | New |
| Margin of victory | | 11,072 | 39.91% | |
| Turnout | | 27,743 | 52.52% | |
| Total valid votes | | 27,743 | | |
| Registered electors | | 52,828 | | |
| PDF win (new seat) | | | | |

== See also ==
- List of constituencies of Telangana Legislative Assembly
