= Talamadugu =

- Town
- Location in Telangana, India Talamadugu (India)
- Coordinates: 19°46′00″N 78°24′13″E
- Country: India
- State: Telangana
- District: Adilabad

Languages
  - Official: Telugu
- Time zone: UTC+5:30 (IST)
- Vehicle registration: TS
- Website: telangana.gov.in

Talamadugu is a village located in Adilabad district in the state of Telangana in India. Talamadugu railway station is located on Adilabad line.
