= Pochera Falls =

- Interactive map of Pochera Falls
- Location: Boath mandal, Adilabad district, Telangana, India
- Coordinates: 19°20′35″N 78°23′13″E
- Type: multi step
- Total height: 20 m (66 ft)
- Number of drops: 2+
- Longest drop: 12 m (39 ft)

The Pochera Waterfalls are located in Adilabad district in the State of Telangana, India.

== Overview ==
The Pochera Waterfalls are classified as multi-step and over a series of steps descend 20 meters. The last two steps are the largest with the largest of the two dropping 12 meters. The small streams of River Godavari are the source of this waterfall, and these streams gradually breaks away as they flow over the Sahyadri Mountain Range.^{[1]} The Pochera waterfall has an emerald, green colored tinge, due to the granite rock bed. Situated amidst dense forests, this waterfall is a popular tourist attraction in Telangana and India.

== See also ==
- List of waterfalls
- List of waterfalls in India
