= Adilabad =

- City
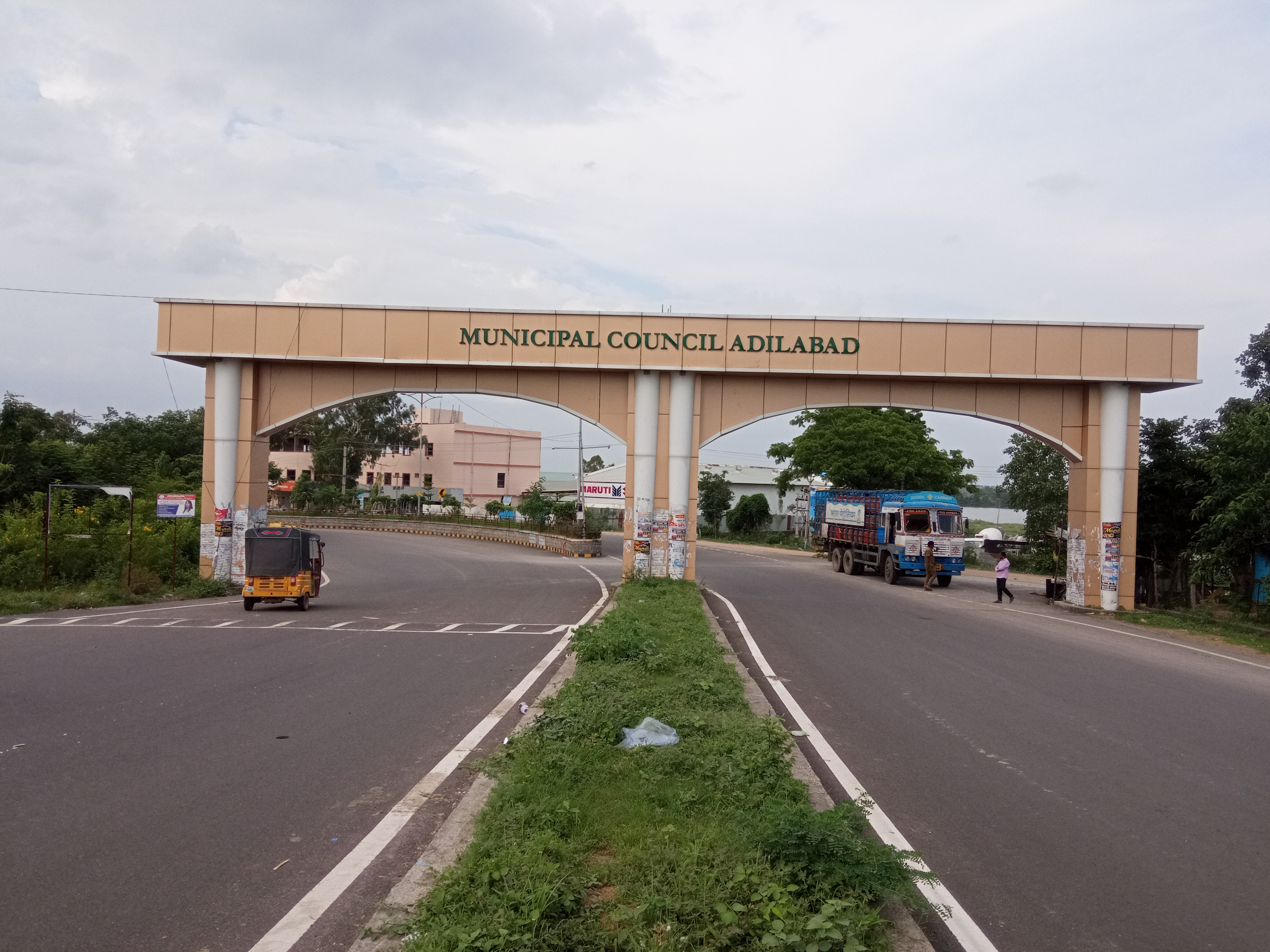
- Gateway to Adilabad

- Location in Telangana Adilabad (Telangana)
- Coordinates: 19°40′12″N 78°31′48″E
- Country: India
- State: Telangana
- District: Adilabad

Government
  - Type: Municipal Council
  - Body: Adilabad Municipal Council
  - MLA: Payal Shanker
  - SP: Akhil mahajan, IPS

Area
  - City: 35.5 km^{2} (13.7 sq mi)
- Elevation: 264 m (866 ft)

Population (2026)
  - City: 173,000
  - Rank: 10th (in state)
  - Density: 4,870/km^{2} (12,600/sq mi)
  - Urban: AUDA
- Demonym: Adilabadi

Language
  - Official: Telugu, Urdu
  - Other: Marathi, Gondi
- Time zone: UTC+5:30 (IST)
- PIN: 504001
- Vehicle registration: TG-01/AP 01(Old)
- Planning Agency: Adilabad Urban Development Authority (AUDA)
- Lok Sabha constituency: Adilabad
- Assembly constituency: Adilabad
- Website: Adilabad Municipality

Adilabad (formally known as Edlawada and Eddulapuram) is a city and the district headquarters of Adilabad district, in the Indian state of Telangana. The official languages of Adilabad are Telugu and Urdu. Marathi, Lambadi, and Gondi are additionally spoken by sections of the population. Adilabad is known for its extensive cultivation of cotton, a major agricultural crop in the region and is often referred to as the "White Gold City" due to the economic importance of cotton production and Bela Town just located 30 km (19 mi) from Adilabad famous for cotton cultivation and many cotton ginning mills and textiles industries established in Bela Town.Bela cotton clothes very popular in Telangana and Maharashtra It is located approximately 304 kilometres (189 mi) north of the state capital, Hyderabad, 30 kilometres (19 mi) from Bela, Adilabad district 150 kilometres (93 mi) from Nizamabad, and 196 kilometres (122 mi) from Nagpur.

== History ==
Before the 10th century, the town was known by names like Edlawāḍa and Eddulapuram, meaning 'Land of Oxen'. Later, during the Qutub Shahi rule in the mid-19th century, it was renamed Edlabad or Adilabad. Adilabad derives its name from the erstwhile ruler of Bijapur, Muhammad Yusuf Adil Shah. Historically, it did not function as a homogenous administrative unit for the extended period. Historically, the area was ruled by many dynasties, including the Kakatiyas, Mauryas, Satavahanas, Chalukyas, Qutub Shahis, Asaf Jahis, and by Gond Rajas of earlier sub-districts Sirpur and Chanda. The district was formed in 1872, and in 1905 it was recognized as an independent district with an own headquarters. Over time, its boundaries were reorganized as various areas were merged or separated. Following the creation of Telangana state in 2016, the district was further subdivided into four districts: Adilabad, Nirmal, Asifabad (also known as Komaram Bheem Asifabad district), and Mancherial.

== Languages ==
Telugu is the most widely spoken language in Adilabad with about 65% of population using it as their mother tongue. Due to geographical proximity with state of Maharashtra, Marathi is also commonly spoken and understood, accounting for 10.5% as native speakers. Other languages used include Hindi, Urdu and Gondi.

== Geography ==
Adilabad has an average elevation of 264 m (866 ft) above the sea level. The district shares its boundaries with the Nirmal district of Telangana to the south, Komaram Bheem district to the east, Nanded district to the west, and the Yavatmal and Chandrapur districts of Maharashtra to the north.

The Kuntala Waterfall and rivers such as the Godavari and Painganga flow through the district. Mavala Lake, built during the Nizam period, is situated 6 km (3.7 mi) south of Adilabad city and a has a park adjacent to it. Other waterfalls in Adilabad include Pochara and Gayatri, where various rope activities are conducted year-round. The Saptha Gundala waterfalls, which consist of seven small waterfalls, are accessible only by trekking due to their remote forest location.

=== Climate ===
Climate data for Adilabad (1991–2020, extremes 1982–2020)
Month	Jan	Feb	Mar	Apr	May	Jun	Jul	Aug	Sep	Oct	Nov	Dec	Year
Record high °C (°F)	37.2 (99.0)	38.5 (101.3)	42.8 (109.0)	46.6 (115.9)	47.3 (117.1)	46.8 (116.2)	39.7 (103.5)	38.7 (101.7)	39.1 (102.4)	38.3 (100.9)	38.3 (100.9)	36 (97)	47.3 (117.1)
Mean daily maximum °C (°F)	29.2 (84.6)	32.8 (91.0)	36.7 (98.1)	40.4 (104.7)	42.5 (108.5)	37.2 (99.0)	31.9 (89.4)	30.6 (87.1)	32.3 (90.1)	32.5 (90.5)	30.9 (87.6)	29.3 (84.7)	33.6 (92.5)
Mean daily minimum °C (°F)	13.2 (55.8)	16.2 (61.2)	20.7 (69.3)	24.8 (76.6)	28.3 (82.9)	26.5 (79.7)	24.3 (75.7)	24.0 (75.2)	23.4 (74.1)	20.4 (68.7)	15.8 (60.4)	12.7 (54.9)	20.4 (68.7)
Record low °C (°F)	4.5 (40.1)	6.4 (43.5)	10.7 (51.3)	14.6 (58.3)	20.1 (68.2)	18.2 (64.8)	18.8 (65.8)	18.2 (64.8)	12.1 (53.8)	10.2 (50.4)	6.8 (44.2)	1.9 (35.4)	1.9 (35.4)
Average rainfall mm (inches)	22.3 (0.88)	4.7 (0.19)	24.7 (0.97)	11.6 (0.46)	14.4 (0.57)	131.1 (5.16)	305.1 (12.01)	231.1 (9.10)	135.7 (5.34)	86.6 (3.41)	8.2 (0.32)	1.3 (0.05)	976.9 (38.46)
Average rainy days	0.9	0.5	1.7	1.1	1.4	6.6	13.7	10.4	7.2	2.6	0.6	0.1	46.9
Average relative humidity (%) (at 17:30 IST)	51	46	42	37	31	49	71	75	70	67	59	57	55
Source 1: India Meteorological Department
Source 2: NOAA

== Demographics ==
Historical population
Year	Pop.	±%
1931	8,096	—
1941	11,128	+37.5%
1951	17,196	+54.5%
1961	20,970	+21.9%
1971	30,368	+44.8%
1981	53,482	+76.1%
1991	84,255	+57.5%
2001	109,529	+30.0%
2011	117,167	+7.0%

According to the 2011 census of India, the city Adilabad had a total population of 117,167. The gender breakdown was 59,448 males, 57,719 females, resulting in a ratio of 971 females per 1,000 males. Children in the 0–6 years age group numbered 12,993. The average literacy rate of Adilabad was 80.45%. The urban agglomeration population of the city was 139,383, the urban agglomeration includes the population of its constituent census town and outgrowth, Dasnapur, which had a population of 22,216.

Religions in Adilabad
Religion	Percent
Hindu	65.37%
Muslim	30.59%
Buddhist	2.60%
Others†	2.44%
†Includes Sikhs, Jains

== Politics ==
Adilabad town is governed by the Adilabad Municipal Council, which is a Special grade municipality with 48 wards. It is the only Municipal council in Adilabad district.

The Adilabad Lok Sabha constituencies is one of the 17 parliamentary in the Indian state of Telangana and consists of eight Legislative Assembly segments.

== Economy ==
The economy of the city primarily driven by trade, small-scale industries, government services, and agriculture-related activities. The city is a major cotton trading center, earning it the nickname "City of Cotton" due to the large volume of cotton procured and marketed from surrounding rural areas. It hosts several cotton ginning and pressing mills, along with agro-processing units for oil extraction and other commodities. Tourism-related services benefit from visitors to nearby attractions such as Kuntala Waterfall and Kawal Tiger Reserve. Recent developments include the establishment of an information technology tower to promote technology-based employment.

== Education ==
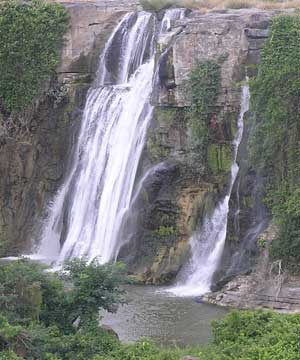
Kuntala Waterfalls

Adilabad is home to several educational institutions. These include the Rajiv Gandhi Institute of Medical Sciences, Adilabad (RIMS Adilabad), a government medical college and hospital. Other institutions in the city are several engineering and degree colleges, polytechnic colleges, and a large number of primary and secondary schools run by both government and private bodies.

== Transport ==
=== Road ===
NH 353B passes through Bela, Adilabad district connects ashti of Gadchiroli district. National highways like NH 44 and NH 353B pass through Adilabad. Hyderabad is 310 km from Adilabad. Nagpur is 196 km away from Adilabad.

=== Bus ===
Daily buses operates from Bela, Adilabad district to Adilabad, Chandrapur, Gadchandur and mukutban

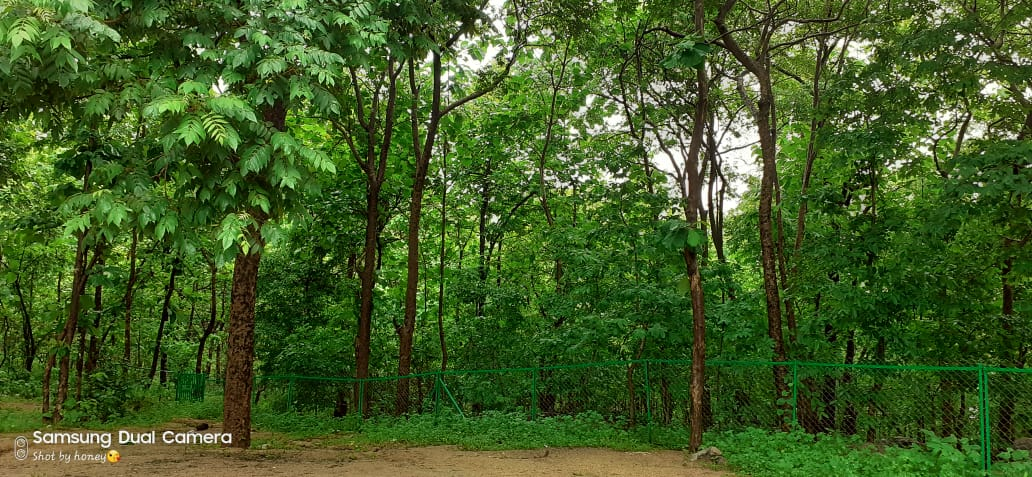
Kawal Tiger Reserve (Present day Mancherial District)

The Telangana State Road Transport Corporation (TGSRTC) operates bus services from Adilabad to various destinations across Telangana and neighboring states. The city's bus station provides direct connectivity to major cities including Hyderabad, Karimnagar, Warangal, Nizamabad, and Khammam in Telangana, Guntur, Vijayawada, and Ongole in Andhra Pradesh, Nagpur in Maharashtra. Services are also available to small towns such as Mancherial, Nirmal, Asifabad, Yavatmal, Nanded, and Utnur.

=== Railway ===
The Adilabad has a railway station which lies on the Mudkhed-Majri section of the Nanded railway division of the South Central Railway (SCR).

=== Air ===
The nearest operational airports close to the city Adilabad are Nanded Airport in Maharashtra which is 200 km (120 mi) away from the city, Nagpur Airport in Maharashtra which is 196 km (122 mi) and the state capital Hyderabad Airport, which is 305 km (190 mi) away from the city.

As of December 2025, a proposed greenfield airport for Adilabad under the UDAN scheme remains in the planning stage and expected to complete end on the year 2026.

== Landmarks ==
- Kuntala Waterfall
- Pochera Falls
- Gayatri Waterfall
- Kanakai waterfall
- Mavala Harithavanam
- Khandala Waterfall
- Utnoor fort
- Narayana swami temple, Jainath
- Kawal tiger reserve
- Sathnala dam

== Notable people ==
- Komaram Bheem
- Samala Sadasiva (Sahitya Akademi Awards)

== See also ==
- Adilabad district
- List of cities in Telangana by population
- Syro-Malabar Catholic Eparchy of Adilabad
