= Inderavelly, Mandal =

Coordinates: 19°29′40″N 78°40′13″E

Inderavelly, is a mandal located in Adilabad district in the Indian state of Telangana. The mandal is name after the village Indervelly.
