= Kuntala Mandal =

Kuntala
- village
- Location in Telangana, India Kuntala (India)
- Coordinates: 19°10′31″N 78°05′47″E
- Country: India
- State: Telangana
- District: Nirmal

Languages
  - Official: Telugu
- Time zone: UTC+5:30 (IST)
- Vehicle registration: TS
- Website: telangana.gov.in

Kuntala is a village and mandal in Nirmal district in the Indian state of Telangana. Kuntala mandal headquarters is Kuntala town. Kuntala mandal is different from Kuntala Waterfall.

Kuntala is located in between the Nirmal - Bhainsa highway towards right at Kallur junction.

It is 37 km from Nirmal and 17 km from Bhainsa.Gajjalamma Temple and Sri Krishna Temple are located in the mandal.

Telangana State Model School in Nirmal district is located in Kuntala Village.
