= Adilabad district =

- District
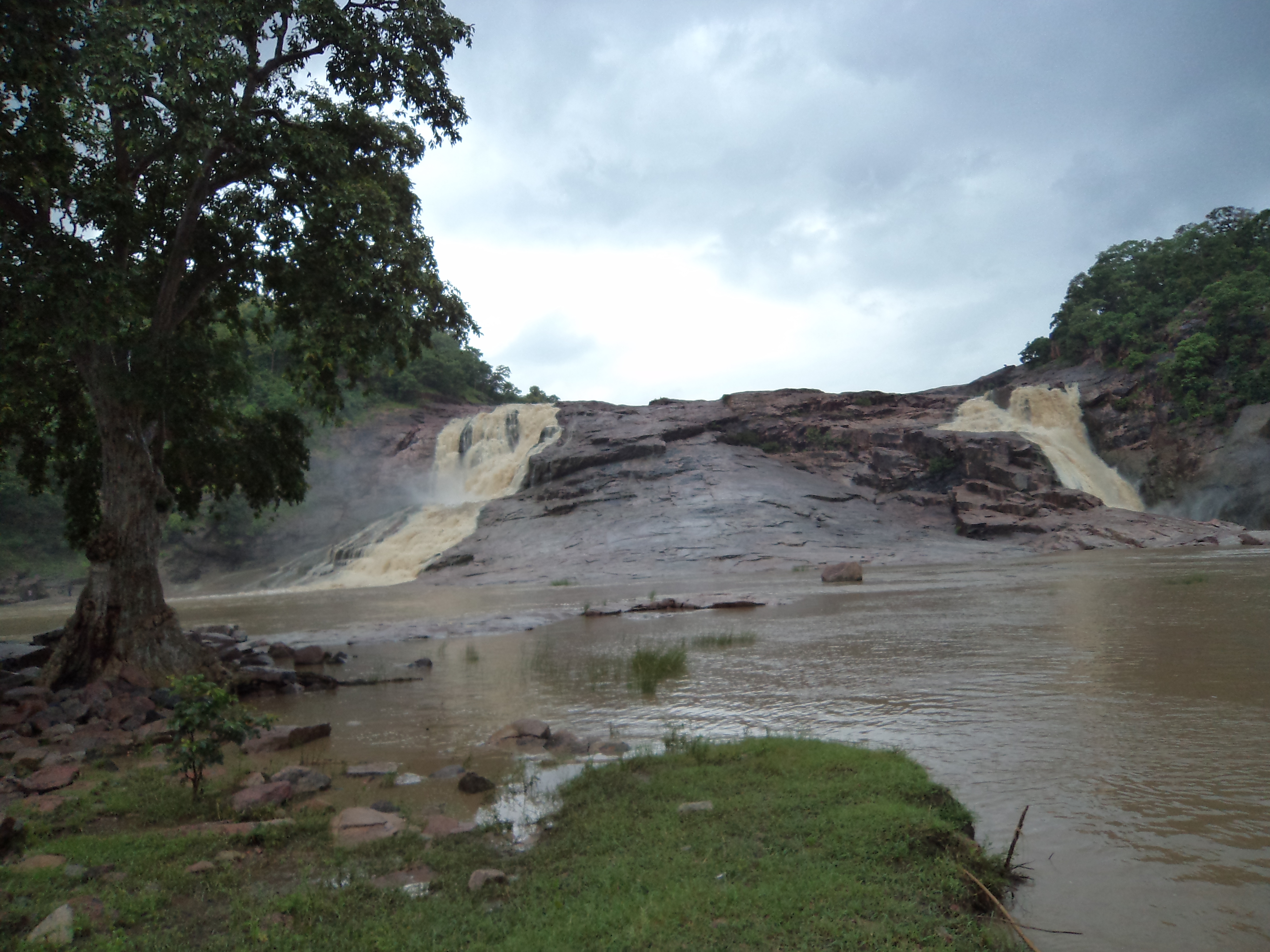
- Kuntala Waterfall

- Coordinates (Adilabad): 19.670000°N 78.530000°E
- Country: India
- State: Telangana
- Established: 1905
- Headquarters: Adilabad
- Mandalas: 18

Government
  - District collector: Rajarshi Shah
  - Parliament Constituencies: Adilabad
  - Assembly constituencies: Adilabad, Boath (ST), Khanapur (ST)
  - MP: Godam Nagesh (BJP)

Area
  - Total: 4,153 km^{2} (1,603 sq mi)
- Elevation: 264 m (866 ft)

Population (2011)
  - Total: 708,972
  - Density: 170.7/km^{2} (442.1/sq mi)

Demographics
  - Literacy: 63.46%
  - Sex ratio: 989

Languages
  - Official: Telugu, Urdu
- Time zone: UTC+05:30 (IST)
- Vehicle registration: AP-01 (until 2014); TS 01 (2014-2024); TG 01 (2024–present)
- Website: adilabad.telangana.gov.in

Adilabad district is a administrative district in the most northern area of Telangana, India. It is known as the gateway district to South India. The district is the named after its headquarters, Adilabad city.

Adilabad district is bounded by Asifabad district to the east, Nirmal district to the south, and the state of Maharashtra to the north and west. As of 2022, it is a part of the red corridor.

== History ==
Before the 10th century, the town was known by names like Edlawāḍa and Eddulapuram, meaning 'Land of Oxen'. Later, during the Qutub Shahi rule in mid-19th century, it was renamed to Edlabad or Adilabad. The district was named for Ali Adil Shah, sultan of Bijapur.

The heavily forested Godavari basin was inhabited during the Mesolithic and Paleolithic periods. Excavations have taken place in the surrounding areas of Luxettipet, Asifabad, Boath, Bhainsa, and Nirmal.

The district was ruled at different times by different dynasties, including the Mauryas, Sathavahanas, Kakatiyas and Gond Rajas. Some Telugu inscriptions made during the time of the Kakatiya dynasty have been found in the Adilabad District, which indicates the historical importance of the area.

Due to the district's reorganization in October 2016, the erstwhile Adilabad district was divided into four districts: Adilabad district, Komaram Bheem Asifabad district, Mancherial district, and Nirmal district.

== Geography ==
The Adilabad district is located in the Telangana state of India. It is bordered to the north by Yavatmal district and Chandrapur district of Maharashtra, to the east by Komaram Bheem district, to the southeast by Mancherial district, to the south by Nirmal district, and to the west by Nanded district of the Maharashtra. It occupies an area of 4,153 km^{2} (1,603 sq mi).

== Demographics ==
According to the 2011 Census of India, the residual Adilabad district has a population of 708,972, with a sex ratio of 989 females to 1000 males. 23.66% of the population lives in urban areas. The literacy rate is 63.46%. Scheduled Castes and Scheduled Tribes make up 99,422 (14.02%) and 224,622 (31.68%) of the population respectively.

=== Religions ===
Religion in Adilabad district (2011)
Hinduism	84.10%
Islam	12.58%
Buddhism	1.64%
Other or not stated	1.68%

Badankurti village in Khanapur mandal of the erstwhile Adilabad district (now in Nirmal district) was explored and remnants of a Buddhist monastery were found on a small island of Godavari river near Badankurthi. The town of Bhainsa was probably related to early Buddhist times, as a pair of carved feet near a mound were found. The residual Adilabad district is Hindu dominated. Islam is the second largest religion, with the majority of Muslims living in urban areas. Buddhism, which has a long history in the district, is also present among the Marathis.

=== Language ===
Languages of Adilabad district (2011)
1. Telugu (36.5%)
2. Marathi (19.7%)
3. Gondi (17.2%)
4. Urdu (10.2%)
5. Lambadi (7.30%)
6. Kolami (2.92%)
7. Hindi (2.05%)
8. Others (4.40%)

In the residual district, 36.50% of the population speaks Telugu, 19.67% Marathi, 17.23% Gondi, 10.23% Urdu, 7.10% Lambadi, 2.92% Kolami and 2.05% Hindi as their first language.

=== Ethnicities ===
The major tribal groups in the area are the Adivasis: Gonds, Kolams, Pardhans, and Thotis.

== Economy ==
In 2006, the Indian government named Adilabad as one of the 250 most backward districts (out of a total of 640) in the country. It is one of the districts in the state of Telangana, currently receiving funds from the Backward Regions Grant Fund Programme (BRGF).

== Administrative divisions ==
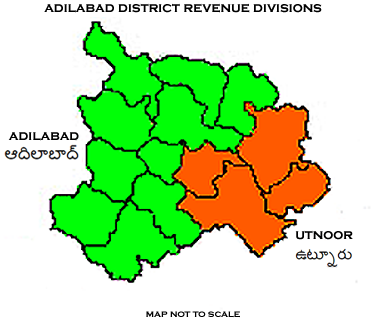
Mandals in Adilabad district at the time of formation

The district is divided into two revenue divisions, Adilabad and Utnoor. These two divisions are sub-divided into 19 mandals. Sri Rajarshi Shah is the current revenue District Collector for the District.

=== Mandals ===
The below table categorizes 19 mandals into their respective revenue divisions in the district:

S.No.	Adilabad revenue division	Utnoor revenue division
1	Adilabad (urban)	Indervelly
2	Adilabad (rural)	Narnoor
3	Mavala	Gadiguda
4	Gudihatnoor	Utnoor
5	Bazarhatnoor	
6	Talamadugu	
7	Tamsi	
8	Bela	
9	Boath	
10	Jainad	
11	Ichoda	
12	Neradigonda	
13	Sirikonda	
14	Bheempur	
15	Sathnala (new)	
16	Bhoraj (new)	
17	Sonala (new)	

== See also ==
- List of districts in Telangana
