= Asifabad Assembly constituency =

Constituency of the Telangana legislative assembly in India

Coordinates: 19.36°N 79.29°E

Asifabad
- Constituency No. 5 for the Telangana Legislative Assembly
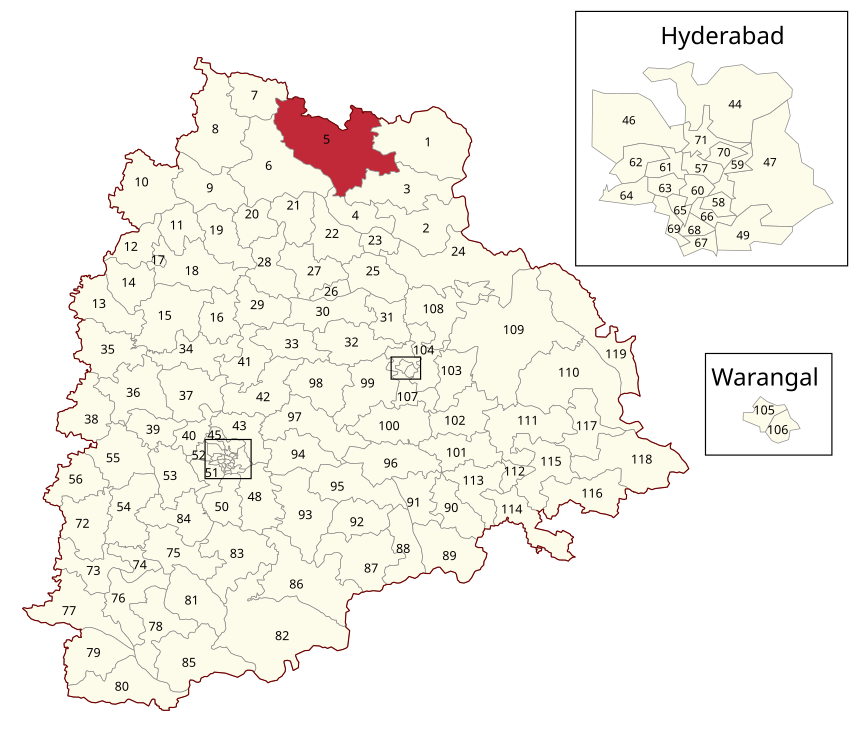
- Location of Aaifabad Assembly constituency within Telangana

Constituency details
- Country: India
- Region: South India
- State: Telangana
- District: Komaram Bheem
- Lok Sabha constituency: Adilabad
- Established: 1951
- Total electors: 1,88,444
- Reservation: ST

Member of Legislative Assembly
- 3rd Telangana Legislative Assembly
- Incumbent Kova Laxmi
- Party: Bharat Rashtra Samithi
- Elected year: 2023

Asifabad Assembly constituency is a constituency of Telangana Legislative Assembly, India. It is one of two constituencies in Komaram Bheem district. It comes under Adilabad Lok Sabha constituency along with six other Assembly constituencies.

Kova Laxmi of Telangana Rashtra Samithi represented the constituency until 2018. Athram Sakku of Indian National Congress is representing the constituency since 2018.

== Mandals ==
The Assembly Constituency presently comprises the following Mandals:

Mandal	District
Kerameri	Komaram Bheem Asifabad
Wankdi	Komaram Bheem Asifabad
Jainoor	Komaram Bheem Asifabad
Narnoor	Adilabad
Tiryani	Komaram Bheem Asifabad
Rebbena	Komaram Bheem Asifabad
Asifabad	Komaram Bheem Asifabad
Sirpur (U)	Komaram Bheem Asifabad
Lingapur	Komaram Bheem Asifabad
Gadhiguda	Adilabad

== Members of the Legislative Assembly ==
Election	Member	Party
1952	Kashi Ram	Indian National Congress
1952	Lakshman	Indian National Congress
1957	G. Narayan Reddy	Indian National Congress
1957	Kashi Ram	Indian National Congress
1962	Kotnaka Bheem Rao	Indian National Congress
1967	Kotnaka Bheem Rao	Indian National Congress
1972	Kotnaka Bheem Rao	Indian National Congress
1978	Dasari Narasiah	Indian National Congress (I)
1983	Gunda Mallesh	Communist Party of India
1985	Gunda Mallesh	Communist Party of India
1989	Dasari Narasiah	Indian National Congress
1994	Gunda Mallesh	Communist Party of India
1999	Dr. Pati Subhadra	Telugu Desam Party
2004	Amurajula Sridevi	Telugu Desam Party
2009	Atram Sakku	Indian National Congress
2014	Kova Laxmi	Bharat Rashtra Samithi
2018	Atram Sakku	Indian National Congress
2023	Kova Laxmi	Bharat Rashtra Samithi

Hyderabad State
Andhra Pradesh

== Election results ==
=== Assembly Election 2023 ===
2023 Telangana Legislative Assembly election : Asifabad
Party	Candidate	Votes	%	±%
BRS	Kova Laxmi	83,052	44.97%	New
INC	Ajmera Shyam	60,242	32.62%	▼9.00
Independent	Kotnaka Vijay Kumar	16,469	8.92%	New
BJP	Ajmeera Athmarao	6,613	3.58%	▼0.67
BSP	Kanaka Prabhakar	3,544	1.92%	▼0.38
Praja Shanthi Party	Ajmera Ram Nayak	2,567	1.39%	New
Independent	Sidam Anniga	2,093	1.13%	New
Independent	Kotnaka Kishanrao	1,534	0.83%	New
NOTA	None of the above	1,516	0.82%	▼0.90
Independent	Mesram Naveen Kumar	1,481	0.80%	New
Margin of victory		22,810	12.35%	▲12.24
Turnout		184,723	81.46%	▼4.84
Total valid votes		184,666		
Registered electors		226,778		▲21.67
BRS gain from INC		Swing	▲3.35	

=== Assembly Election 2018 ===
2018 Telangana Legislative Assembly election : Asifabad
Party	Candidate	Votes	%	±%
INC	Atram Sakku	65,788	41.62%	▲13.74
BRS	Kova Laxmi	65,617	41.51%	▲0.36
BJP	Ajmeera Athmarao	6,711	4.25%	New
TJS	Kotnaka Vijay Kumar	6,183	3.91%	New
BSP	Ajmera Ram Nayak	3,629	2.30%	▼0.50
Bhartiya Bahujan Kranti Dal	Ade Balaji	3,039	1.92%	New
API	Mukade Vishnu	2,972	1.88%	New
Nava Praja Rajyam Party	Kursenga Vasanth Rao	1,721	1.09%	New
Bahujana Raajyam Party (Phule Ambedkar)	Banovath Jagan	1,240	0.78%	New
Independent	Bhukya Indal Rao	1,175	0.74%	New
Margin of victory		171	0.11%	▼13.16
Turnout		160,862	86.30%	▲8.54
Total valid votes		158,075		
Registered electors		186,390		▼2.03
INC gain from BRS		Swing	▲0.47	

=== Assembly Election 2014 ===
2014 Telangana Legislative Assembly election : Asifabad
Party	Candidate	Votes	%	±%
BRS	Kova Laxmi	59,094	41.15%	▲17.73
INC	Atram Sakku	40,039	27.88%	▼8.51
TDP	Marsukola Sarswathi	25,439	17.71%	New
Mahajana Socialist Party	Kotnaka Vijay Kumar	7,735	5.39%	New
Independent	Ade Leelarani	4,592	3.20%	New
BSP	Kanaka Ramabai	4,022	2.80%	▼1.47
NOTA	None of the above	2,833	1.97%	New
Independent	Pendram Gopi	1,370	0.95%	New
GGP	Sidam Arju	1,314	0.92%	New
Margin of victory		19,055	13.27%	▲0.31
Turnout		147,949	77.76%	▲1.24
Total valid votes		143,605		
Registered electors		190,257		▲23.29
BRS gain from INC		Swing	▲4.76	

=== Assembly Election 2009 ===
2009 Andhra Pradesh Legislative Assembly election : Asifabad
Party	Candidate	Votes	%	±%
INC	Atram Sakku	42,907	36.39%	New
BRS	Pendram Gopi	27,621	23.42%	▲10.67
Independent	Ajmera Rekha	13,695	11.61%	New
PRP	Ade Ramesh	11,963	10.15%	New
Independent	Rathod Govind Naik	5,357	4.54%	New
BSP	Kanaka Ramabai	5,040	4.27%	New
Independent	Sallam Krishna Rao	4,448	3.77%	New
BJP	Sidam Jaggarao	4,244	3.60%	New
Independent	Bukya Chandulal	2,642	2.24%	New
Margin of victory		15,286	12.96%	▲8.28
Turnout		118,082	76.52%	▲7.97
Total valid votes		117,917		
Registered electors		154,321		▼9.13
INC gain from TDP		Swing	▼2.97	

=== Assembly Election 2004 ===
2004 Andhra Pradesh Legislative Assembly election : Asifabad
Party	Candidate	Votes	%	±%
TDP	Amurajula Sridevi	45,817	39.36%	▼7.24
CPI	Gunda Mallesh	40,365	34.68%	▲19.72
BRS	Jangampelli Rajamallu	14,847	12.75%	New
Independent	Dr. Pati Subhadra	8,053	6.92%	New
Independent	Mudimadugula Vijayalaxmi	3,190	2.74%	New
RPI(K)	Kondagorla Srinivas	2,688	2.31%	New
Independent	Ambala Mahender	1,450	1.25%	New
Margin of victory		5,452	4.68%	▼5.87
Turnout		116,410	68.55%	▲0.76
Total valid votes		116,403		
Rejected ballots		7	0.01%	▼4.73
Registered electors		169,827		▲1.52
TDP hold		Swing	▼7.24	

=== Assembly Election 1999 ===
1999 Andhra Pradesh Legislative Assembly election : Asifabad
Party	Candidate	Votes	%	±%
TDP	Dr. Pati Subhadra	50,341	46.60%	New
INC	Dasari Narasiah	38,948	36.05%	▲12.91
CPI	Gunda Mallesh	16,161	14.96%	▼42.69
Marxist Communist Party of India (S.S.Srivastava)	Regunta Keshav	1,095	1.01%	New
RPI	Gogarla Komresh	879	0.81%	New
Margin of victory		11,393	10.55%	▼23.96
Turnout		113,405	67.79%	▲1.30
Total valid votes		108,034		
Rejected ballots		5,371	4.74%	▲0.72
Registered electors		167,283		▲7.86
TDP gain from CPI		Swing	▼11.05	

=== Assembly Election 1994 ===
1994 Andhra Pradesh Legislative Assembly election : Asifabad
Party	Candidate	Votes	%	±%
CPI	Gunda Mallesh	57,058	57.65%	▲13.46
INC	Dasari Narasiah	22,903	23.14%	▼28.58
Independent	Edgirala Chandra Shekar	11,006	11.12%	New
BJP	Ratnam Lingaiah	3,756	3.80%	New
AAP	Nagroop	1,452	1.47%	New
BSP	Latabai	1,449	1.46%	New
Independent	Thidala Laxmi	660	0.67%	New
Margin of victory		34,155	34.51%	▲26.98
Turnout		103,115	66.49%	▲8.76
Total valid votes		98,965		
Rejected ballots		4,150	4.02%	▼2.63
Registered electors		155,090		▲6.12
CPI gain from INC		Swing	▲5.93	

=== Assembly Election 1989 ===
1989 Andhra Pradesh Legislative Assembly election : Asifabad
Party	Candidate	Votes	%	±%
INC	Dasari Narasiah	40,736	51.72%	▲10.04
CPI	Gunda Mallesh	34,804	44.19%	▼4.58
Independent	Durgam Sham Rao	2,835	3.60%	New
Margin of victory		5,932	7.53%	▲0.44
Turnout		84,371	57.73%	▲4.45
Total valid votes		78,763		
Rejected ballots		5,608	6.65%	▲4.11
Registered electors		146,142		▲32.84
INC gain from CPI		Swing	▲2.95	

=== Assembly Election 1985 ===
1985 Andhra Pradesh Legislative Assembly election : Asifabad
Party	Candidate	Votes	%	±%
CPI	Gunda Mallesh	27,862	48.77%	▲14.83
INC	Dasari Narasiah	23,814	41.68%	▲8.32
Independent	Battu Bucham	2,893	5.06%	New
Independent	Revelli Hemalatha	728	1.27%	New
Independent	Jagati Rajalingam	692	1.21%	New
Independent	Matoori Durgaiah	685	1.20%	New
Independent	J. Singaiah	459	0.80%	New
Margin of victory		4,048	7.09%	▲6.51
Turnout		58,619	53.28%	▼3.57
Total valid votes		57,133		
Rejected ballots		1,486	2.54%	▼0.57
Registered electors		110,011		▲16.70
CPI hold		Swing	▲14.83	

=== Assembly Election 1983 ===
1983 Andhra Pradesh Legislative Assembly election : Asifabad
Party	Candidate	Votes	%	±%
CPI	Gunda Mallesh	17,623	33.94%	▲6.45
INC	Dasari Narasiah	17,320	33.36%	New
Independent	Edisirala Chandrasekhar	16,979	32.70%	New
Margin of victory		303	0.58%	▼8.26
Turnout		53,590	56.85%	▲2.85
Total valid votes		51,922		
Rejected ballots		1,668	3.11%	▼1.63
Registered electors		94,268		▲11.43
CPI gain from INC(I)		Swing	▼2.39	

=== Assembly Election 1978 ===
1978 Andhra Pradesh Legislative Assembly election : Asifabad
Party	Candidate	Votes	%	±%
INC(I)	Dasari Narasiah	15,812	36.33%	New
CPI	Gunda Mallesh	11,963	27.49%	▲4.93
JP	Katham Rajalingam	7,502	17.24%	New
RPI(K)	Dayanand Chereker	3,247	7.46%	New
Independent	Perugu Hectu	2,174	5.00%	New
Independent	Asadi Rajamallu	1,761	4.05%	New
Independent	Katam Chandraiah	620	1.42%	New
Independent	Maturu Dirgaiah	272	0.62%	New
Margin of victory		3,849	8.84%	▼46.05
Turnout		45,687	54.00%	▲0.98
Total valid votes		43,523		
Rejected ballots		2,164	4.74%	▲4.74
Registered electors		84,602		▲20.15
INC(I) gain from INC		Swing	▼41.11	

=== Assembly Election 1972 ===
1972 Andhra Pradesh Legislative Assembly election : Asifabad
Party	Candidate	Votes	%	±%
INC	K. Bheem Rao	27,279	77.44%	▲21.27
CPI	Sida Mothi	7,945	22.56%	▼13.68
Margin of victory		19,334	54.89%	▲34.96
Turnout		37,335	53.02%	▲0.18
Total valid votes		35,224		
Registered electors		70,413		▲17.08
INC hold		Swing	▲21.27	

=== Assembly Election 1967 ===
1967 Andhra Pradesh Legislative Assembly election : Asifabad
Party	Candidate	Votes	%	±%
INC	K. Bheem Rao	16,862	56.17%	▼7.91
CPI	A. G. Reddy	10,879	36.24%	▲0.32
ABJS	A. E. Rao	2,279	7.59%	New
Margin of victory		5,983	19.93%	▼8.23
Turnout		31,779	52.84%	▲13.99
Total valid votes		30,020		
Registered electors		60,140		▲6.52
INC hold		Swing	▼7.91	

=== Assembly Election 1962 ===
1962 Andhra Pradesh Legislative Assembly election : Asifabad
Party	Candidate	Votes	%	±%
INC	K. Bheem Rao	13,186	64.08%	▲11.85
CPI	Atram Assuvantha Rao	7,391	35.92%	New
Margin of victory		5,795	28.16%	▲19.62
Turnout		21,932	38.85%	▼1.68
Total valid votes		20,577		
Registered electors		56,458		▼44.07
INC hold		Swing	▲37.16	

=== Assembly Election 1957 ===
1957 Andhra Pradesh Legislative Assembly election : Asifabad
Party	Candidate	Votes	%	±%
INC	G. Narayan Reddy	22,028	26.92%	▼31.32
INC	Kashi Ram	20,707	25.31%	▼32.93
PDF	Ramakrishna Sastry	15,044	18.39%	New
PDF	Kashi Rao	13,759	16.82%	New
Independent	Gangadhar Gowd	10,287	12.57%	New
Margin of victory		6,984	8.54%	▼1.15
Turnout		81,825	40.53%	▲8.57
Total valid votes		81,825		
Registered electors		100,948		▼0.45
INC hold		Swing	▼2.29	

=== Assembly Election 1952 ===
1952 Hyderabad State Legislative Assembly election : Asifabad
Party	Candidate	Votes	%	±%
INC	Kashi Ram	18,937	29.21%	New
INC	Lakshman	18,817	29.03%	New
SP	Maroti Rao	12,653	19.52%	New
SP	Ada Mengu	11,157	17.21%	New
Independent	Nagaiah Reddy	3,264	5.03%	New
Margin of victory		6,284	9.69%	
Turnout		64,828	31.96%	
Total valid votes		64,828		
Registered electors		101,405		
INC win (new seat)				

== See also ==
- List of constituencies of Telangana Legislative Assembly
