= Sirpur Assembly constituency =

Constituency of the Telangana Legislative Assembly, India

Coordinates: 17.52°N 77.84°E

Sirpur
- Constituency No. 1 for the Telangana Legislative Assembly
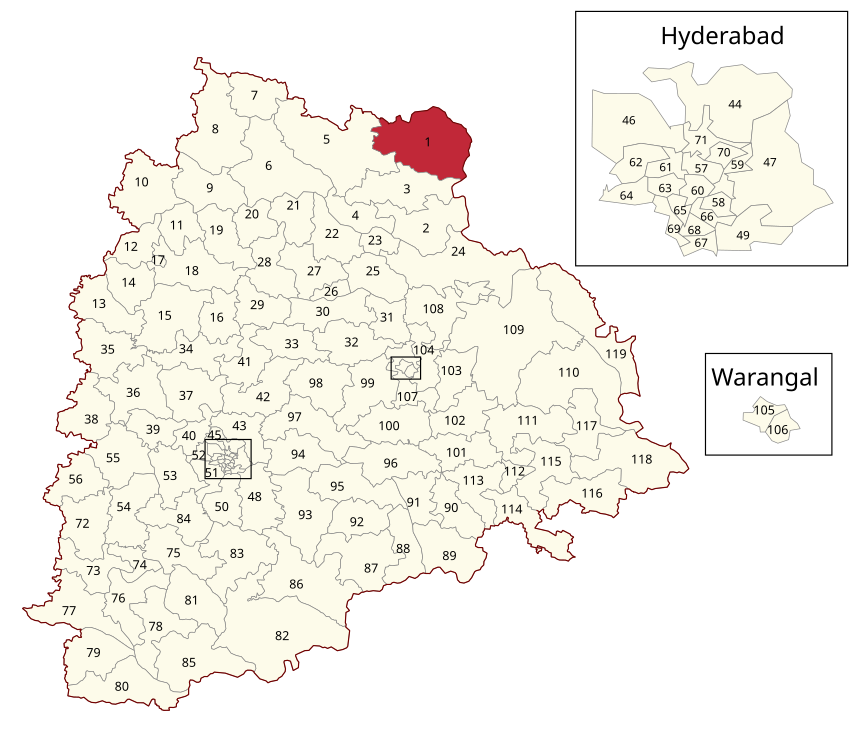
- Location of Sirpur Assembly constituency within Telangana

Constituency details
- Country: India
- Region: South India
- State: Telangana
- District: Komaram Bheem Asifabad
- Lok Sabha constituency: Adilabad
- Established: 1951
- Total electors: 170,164
- Reservation: None

Member of Legislative Assembly
- 3rd Telangana Legislative Assembly
- Incumbent Palvai Harish Babu
- Party: BJP
- Elected year: 2023

Sirpur Assembly constituency is one of 119 constituencies in Telangana Legislative Assembly It is located in Komaram Bheem Asifabad district in state of Telangana, India. It is one of the seven assembly segments of Adilabad Lok Sabha constituency.

Palvai Harish Babu is the current MLA of the constituency, having won the 2023 Telangana Legislative Assembly election from Bharatiya Janata Party.

== Mandals ==
The Assembly Constituency presently comprises the following Mandals:

Mandal
Kouthala
Bejjur
Kagaznagar
Sirpur (T)
Dahegaon
Penchikalpet
Chintalamanepally

== Members of the Legislative Assembly ==
Year	Member	Party
Hyderabad State Legislative Assembly
1952	M. Buchaiah	Socialist Party
United Andhra Pradesh Legislative Assembly
1957	G. Venkatswamy	Indian National Congress
1962	G. Sanjeeva Reddy	Indian National Congress
1967	G. Sanjeeva Reddy	Indian National Congress
1972	K. V. Keshavalu	Indian National Congress
1978	K. V. Keshavalu	Indian National Congress
1983	K. V. Narayana Rao	Telugu Desam Party
1985	K. V. Narayana Rao	Telugu Desam Party
1989	Palvai Purushotham Rao	Independent politician
1994	Palvai Purushotham Rao	Independent politician
1999	Palvai Rajyalaxmi	Telugu Desam Party
2004	Koneru Konappa	Indian National Congress
2009	Kaveti Sammaiah	Telangana Rashtra Samithi
2010	Kaveti Sammaiah	Telangana Rashtra Samithi
Telangana Legislative Assembly
2014	Koneru Konappa	Bahujan Samaj Party
2018	Koneru Konappa	Telangana Rashtra Samithi
2023	Palvai Harish Babu	Bharatiya Janata Party

== Election results ==
=== 2023 ===
2023 Telangana Legislative Assembly election: Sirpur
Party	Candidate	Votes	%	±%
BJP	Palvai Harish Babu	63,702	34.09	+30.27
BRS	Koneru Konappa	60,614	32.43	−18.14
BSP	R. S. Praveen Kumar	44,646	23.89	+23.89
INC	Raavi Srinivas	8,427	4.51	−31.43
NOTA	None of the Above	2,196	1.18	
Majority		3,008	1.16	
Turnout		1,86,880		
BJP gain from TRS		Swing		

=== 2018 ===
2018 Telangana Legislative Assembly election: Sirpur
Party	Candidate	Votes	%	±%
BRS	Koneru Konappa	83,088	50.57	▲24.00
INC	Palvai Harish Babu	59,052	35.94	▲18.12
BJP	Kottapelli Srinivas	6,279	3.82	▲3.82
BSP	Raavi Srinivas	5,379	3.27	▼29.14
Independent	Tallapalli Thirupathi	4,039	2.46	▲2.46
NOTA	None of the Above	1,579	0.96	▲0.96
Majority		24,036	14.80	▲14.8
Turnout		1,64,288	85.96	▲5.45
BRS gain from BSP		Swing		

=== 2014 ===
2014 Telangana Legislative Assembly election: Sirpur
Party	Candidate	Votes	%	±%
BSP	Koneru Konappa	49,033	32.41%	
BRS	Kaveti Sammaiah	40,196	26.57%	
INC	Kokkirala Prem Sagar Rao	26,955	17.82%	
TDP	Raavi Srinivas Rao	19,359	12.8%	
Majority		8,837		
Turnout		1,51,288	80.49%	
BSP gain from BRS		Swing		

== See also ==
- List of constituencies of Telangana Legislative Assembly
