= Palvai Rajyalaxmi =

Indian politician

Member of Legislative Assembly, Andhra Pradesh
- In office 1999–2004
- Preceded by: Palvai Purushotam Rao
- Succeeded by: Koneru Konappa
- Constituency: Sirpur

Personal details
- Other political affiliations: Telugu Desam Party
- Spouse: Palvai Purushotam Rao
- Relatives: Palvai Harish Babu (son)

Palvai Rajyalaxmi is an Indian politician from Telangana. She is a former Member of the Legislative Assembly from Sirpur Assembly constituency in the erstwhile Adilabad district, renamed as Komaram Bheem Asifabad district.

On 15 September 1999, her husband and sitting Sirpur MLA, Palvai Purushotham Rao, was gunned down by maoists in Kagaznagar town. Her son Palvai Harish Babu is a doctor and late became an MLA from the same constituency. She won from the seat held by her husband. She contested on Telugu Desam ticket and won the 1999 Andhra Pradesh Legislative Assembly election. She polled 57,318 votes and defeated her nearest rival, Koneru Konappa of the Indian National Congress, by a margin of 29,967 votes.
