= Kaveti Sammaiah =

Indian politician (1958–2021)

Kavetii Sammaiah (1958 – 9 April 2021) was an Indian politician from Andhra Pradesh. He was a former member of the Andhra Pradesh Legislative Assembly from the Sirpur Assembly constituency in the erstwhile Adilabad district, later renamed as Kumram Bheem Asifabad district, representing the Telangana Rashtra Samithi.

== Early life ==
Sammaiah was born in Kagaznagar, Adilabad district, Andhra Pradesh, in 1959. He was the son of the late K. Mannalu. He studied at Topper High School, Ballarpur, Maharastra and passed the Class 7 examinations in 1973. He worked in the local Sirsilk Mill until it was closed in 2000. His wife Saileela was the chairperson of the municipal body in 2000. He declared assets worth Rs.2 crore in his affidavit to the Election Commission of India.

== Career ==
Sammaiah started his political journey with the Indian National Congress. But due to differences with Koneru Konappa during the 2004 election, he left Congress. Later in 2007, he joined the Telangana Rashtra Samithi. He won the Sirpur Assembly constituency in the 2009 Andhra Pradesh Legislative Assembly election representing the TRS. He polled 47,978 votes and defeated his nearest rival, Koneru Konappa of the Indian National Congress, by 7,414 votes. He also won the byelection in 2010, but quit politics after he lost the seat in the 2014 Andhra Pradesh Legislatie Assembly election.

=== Death ===
Sammaiah died on 9 April 2020 at a private hospital in Kagaznagar, Kumram Bheem Asifabad district, due to cardiac arrest. He is survived by his wife and three children.
