= Kumuram Bheem Tribal Museum =

Museum in Jodeghat, Telangana, India

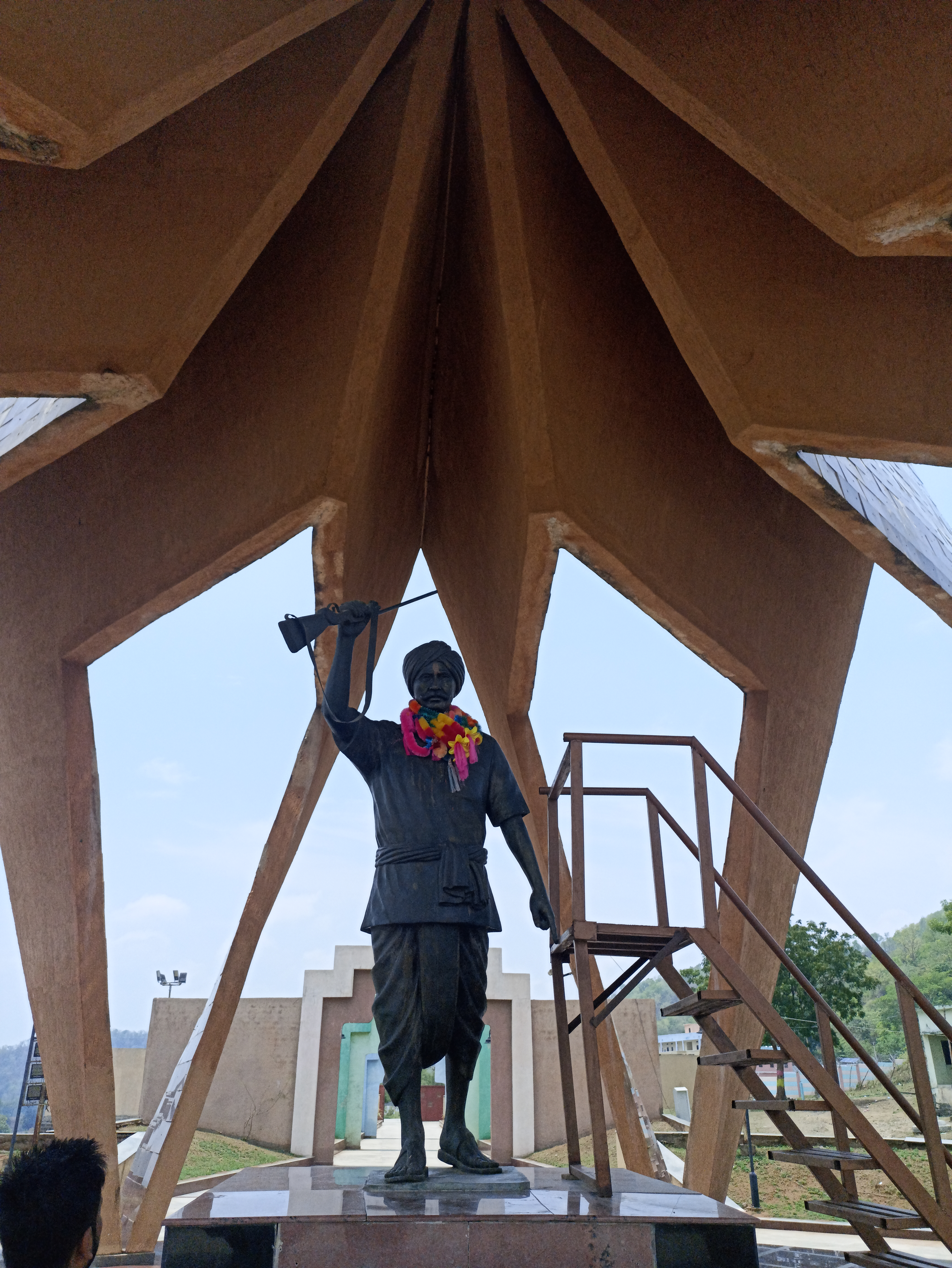
- Kumuram Bheem Statue at Jodeghat Tribal Museum
- Established: 2016
- Location: Kerameri, Asifabad district, Telangana
- Coordinates: 19.36779°N 79.16104°E
- Collection size: Tribal Aritifacts
- Owner: Government of Telangana

Kumuram Bheem Tribal Museum is a museum at Jodeghat village of Kerameri mandal at Komaram bheem Asifabad district. The Jodeghat Museum, also known as the Asifabad Museum, is one of the most important cultural sites in the Asifabad and adjacent areas.

The museum stands out as one of the most historically significant locations in terms of Asifabad's tribal culture and Heritage. On September 1, 1940, Adivasi fighter Kumuram Bheem and his companions were martyred at Jodeghat, and the location developed a reputation for bravery and courage.

Kumuram Bheem, the popular tribal revolutionary, fought for Adivasi rights and was known for his thoughts on Jal (water), Jungle (forest) and Zameen (land).

== History ==
The museum was launched on October 16, 2016, by Chief Minister Kalvakuntla Chandra Shekhar Rao, in honour of tribal chiefs who bravely fought for Jal (water), Jungle (forest), and Zameen (land).

Kumuram Bheem was a tribal leader who rose up against Nizam police brutality in order to protect Adivasi rights and forest areas. Because the steep location has good defence facilities, Bheem has picked Jodeghat as the focal point for combating police forces. Tribal people were disturbed by Bheem's quest for sovereignty over Jal, the jungle, and Zameen. The news quickly travelled to 12 newly constructed hamlets in Asifabad district's Kerameri Mandal. He used guerrilla warfare method for fighting against the Nizams.

On September 10, 1940, Bheem held his last meet at Avval pen of Jodeghat, and Nizam's men assaulted him. Kumuram Bheem and several of his followers were murdered in the fight.

== Attractions ==
Telangana's government has recognised the importance and built a museum in honour of tribal warrior Kumuram Bheem. Later, a grant of 25 crores was approved for the museum's construction and development as a hub for tribal traditions in the Asifabad area.

The museum houses a collection of tribal relics, primarily from the Gonds, Kollams, Thotis, Andhs, and Pradhans. The museum also features sculptures depicting tribal customs and events. The museum stands as a hub representing tribal culture and it also has statues of Tribal Gods.

== Gallery ==
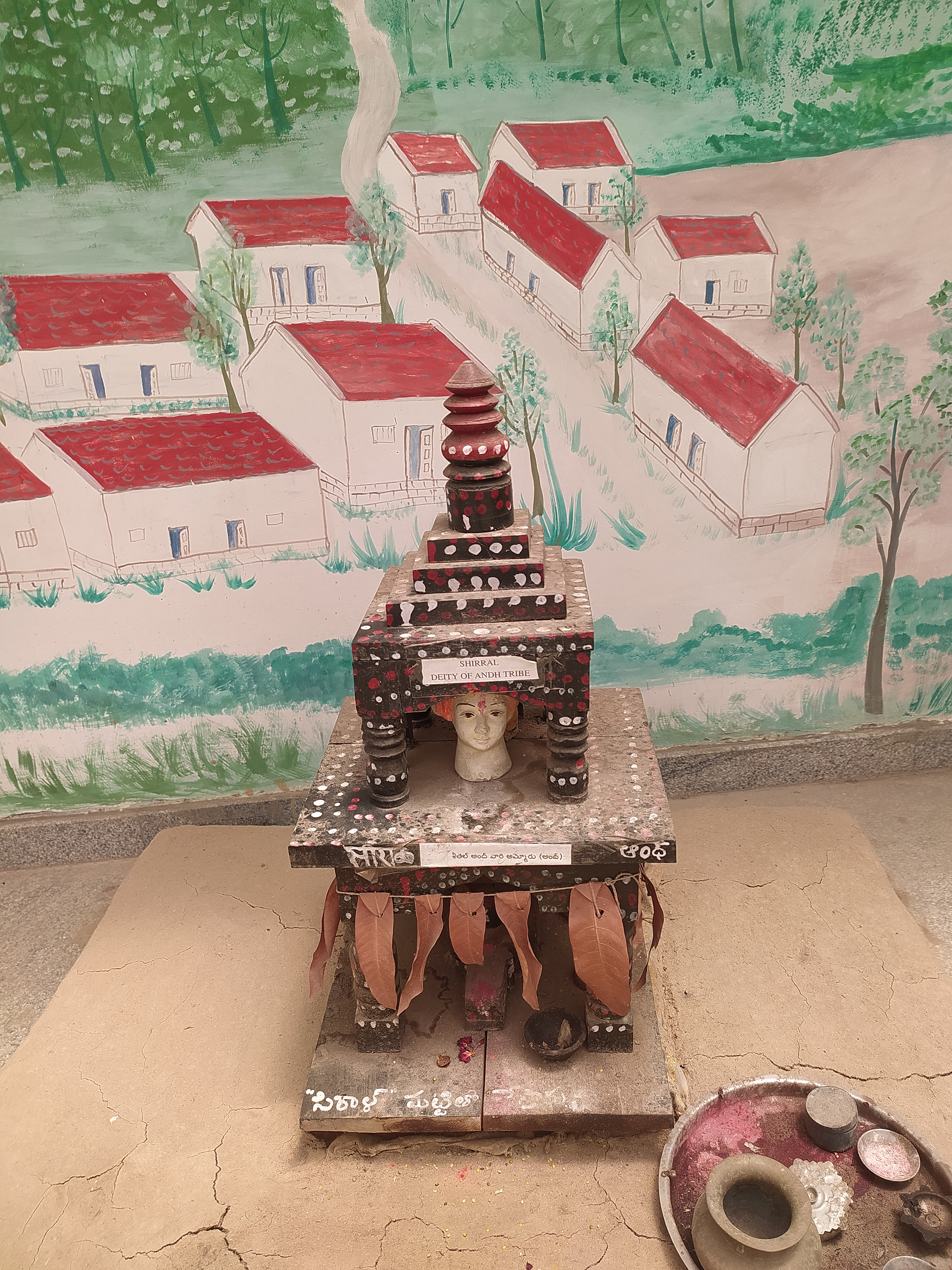
Shirral deity of Andh Tribe

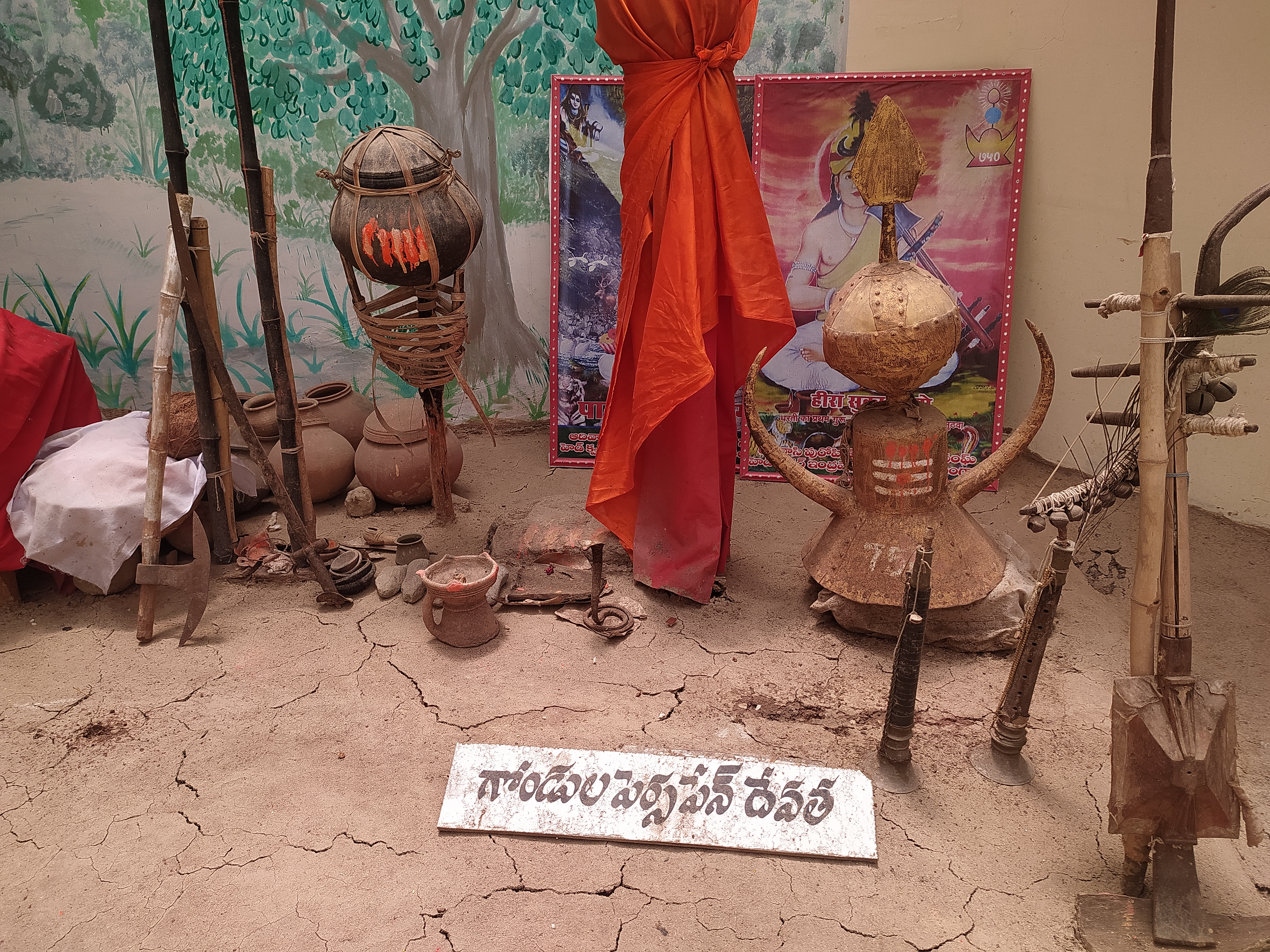
Persapen Goddess

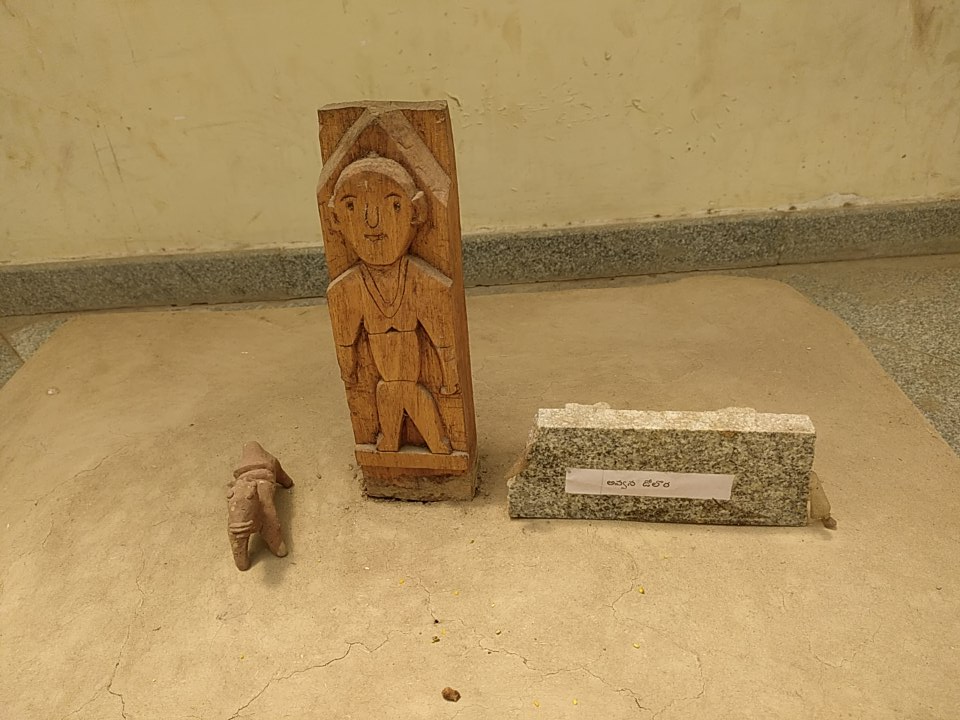
Avvana Dolera

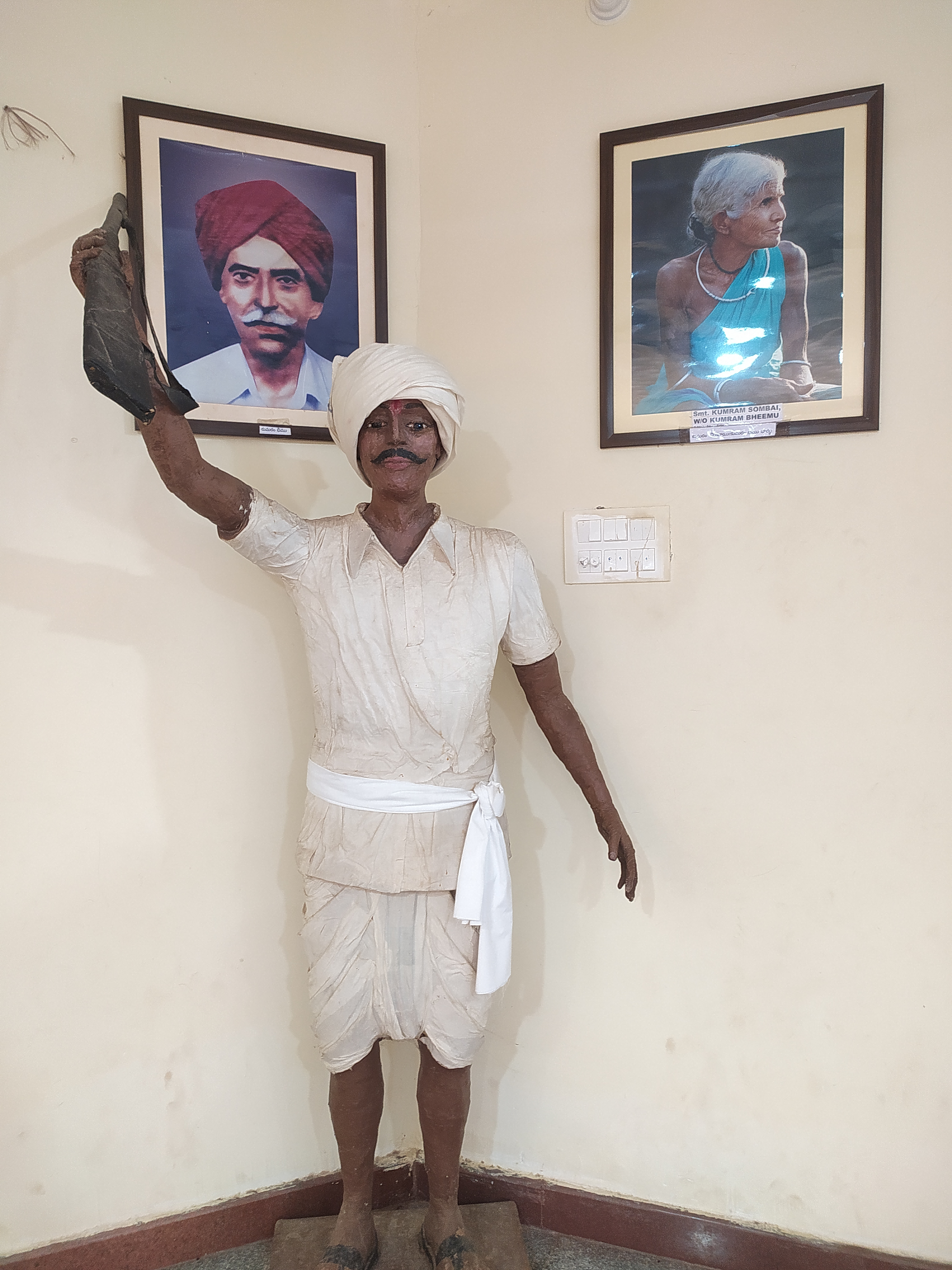
Kumuram Bheem statue at Museum

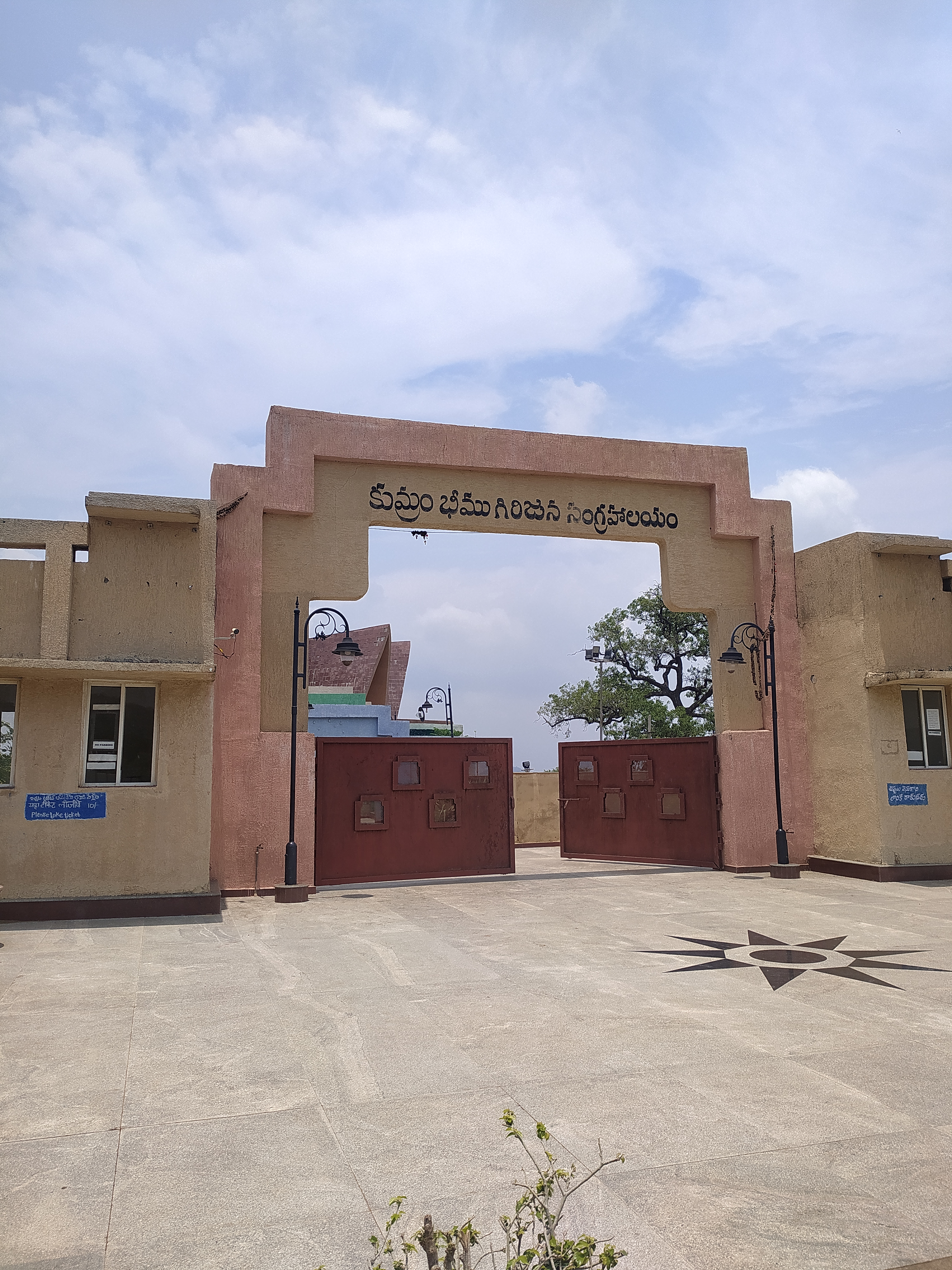
Kumuram Bheem Tribal museum entrance

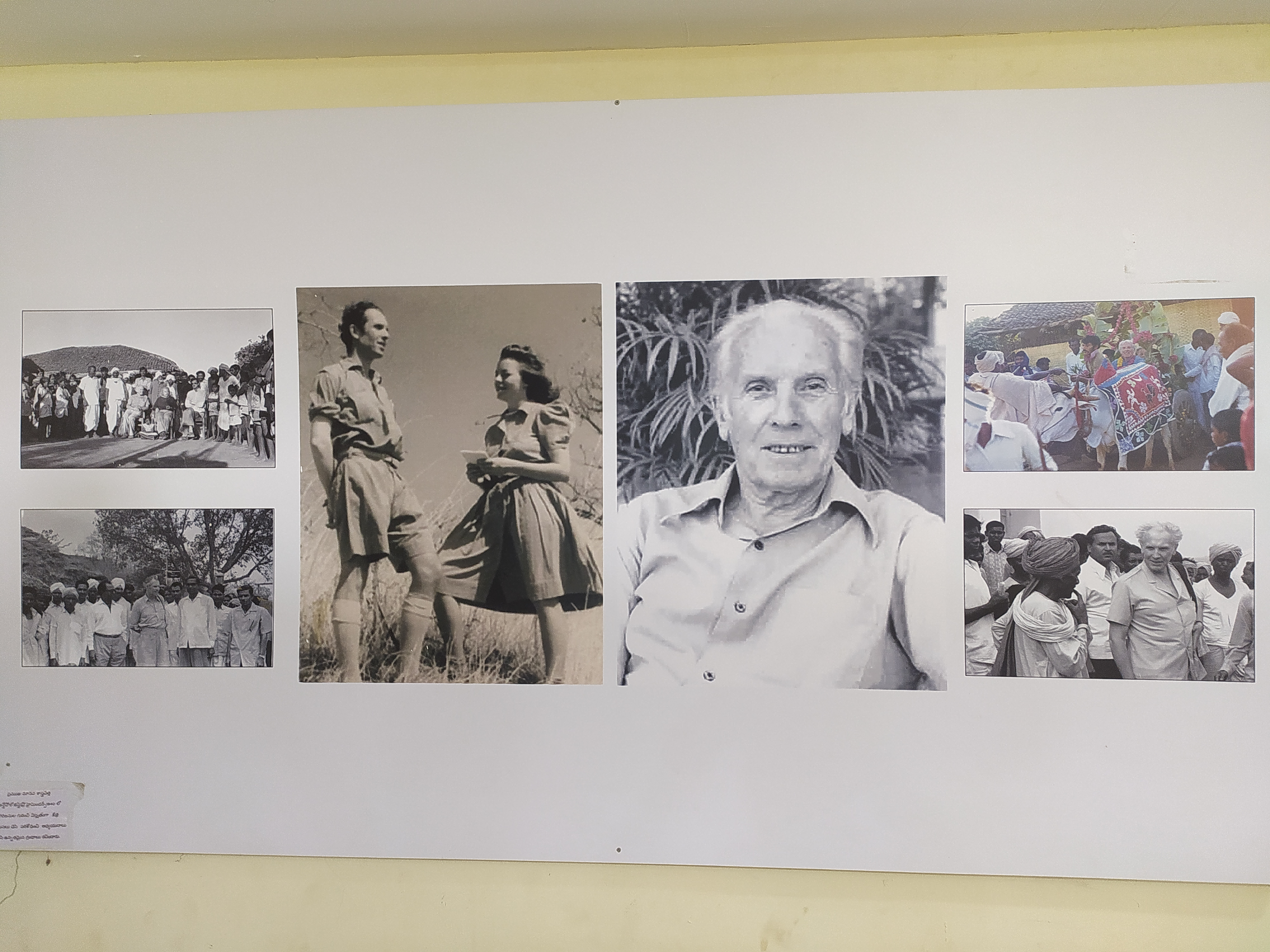
Haimendorf gallery
