= Palvai Harish Babu =

Indian politician

Member of Telangana Legislative Assembly
- Incumbent
- Assumed office 3 December 2023
- Preceded by: Koneru Konappa
- Constituency: Sirpur

Personal details
- Born: 5 July 1981 (age 44) Rebbena, Bejjur mandal, Komaram Bheem Asifabad district, Telangana
- Party: Bharatiya Janata Party
- Other political affiliations: Indian National Congress (2018 - 2021)

Palvai Harish Babu is an Indian politician from Telangana. He won the 2023 Telangana Legislative Assembly election representing Bharatiya Janata Party from Sirpur Assembly constituency in Komaram Bheem Asifabad district.

== Early life and education ==
Harish Babu did his MBBS from Osmania Medical College Hyderabad in 2004, MS Orthopedics from Sri Ramachandra University Chennai in 2010, DNB Orthopedics from National Board of Examination New Delhi in 2011.

== Career ==
Babu is the son of Palvai Purushottam Rao who won as an Independent MLA in 1989 and 1994, and he also contested the 1999 elections before he was shot dead by Peoples War group. Later, his mother Palvai Rajyalakshmi contested as a TDP candidate and won in the 1999 Andhra Pradesh Legislative Assembly election. After a long time, Palvai Harish won from Sirpur Assembly constituency as a BJP candidate. He was Sirpur-Kagaznagar constituency in-charge.

Babu was appointed BJP Legislature Party chief whip on 14 February 2024.
