= Athram Sakku =

Indian politician

Member of the Andhra Pradesh Legislative Assembly
- In office 2009–2014
- Preceded by: Amurajula Sridevi
- Succeeded by: Kova Laxmi

Member of the Telangana Legislative Assembly
- In office 2018–2023
- Preceded by: Kova Laxmi
- Succeeded by: Kova Laxmi

Personal details
- Party: Indian National Congress

Athram Sakku (born 1973) is an Indian politician from Telangana. He is a former two time member of the Legislative Assembly from Asifabad Assembly constituency, which is reserved for Scheduled Tribe community, in Adilabad district. He was last elected in the 2018 Telangana Legislative Assembly election representing the Indian National Congress. Earlier in 2009, he was elected as an MLA from the Asifabad seat in the United Andhra Pradesh.

== Early life and education ==
Sakku is from Asifabad, Adilabad district, Telangana. He is the son of Athram Raju. He studied Class 10 at Government Ashram School, Ginnedari and passed the examinations conducted by SSC board in 1989. His wife is a teacher employed by the Integrated Tribal Development Authority (ITDA).

== Career ==
Sakku was first elected as an MLA winning the 2009 Andhra Pradesh Legislative Assembly election in the Asifabad Assembly constituency representing the Indian National Congress. He polled 42,907 votes and defeated his nearest rival, Pendram Gopi of the Telangana Rashtra Samithi, by a margin of 15,286 votes. In the 2014 Andhra Pradesh Legislative Assembly election, he lost the Asifabad seat to Kova Laxmi of the TRS by a margin of 19,055 votes. Lakshmi polled 59,094 votes to 40,039 garnered by Sakku. But he regained the Asifabad seat, after the bifurcation of the state in the 2018 Telangana Legislative Assembly election representing Indian National Congress. In 2018, he polled 65.788 votes and defeated his closest opponent, Kova Laxmi of the TRS by a margin of 171 votes. In 2023 Sakku was denied a ticket b the Congress Party and Kova Laxmi won the 2023 Telangana Legislative Assembly election defeating Ajmera Shyam of the Indian National Congress, by a margin of 22,798 votes. Later, he shifted to the BRS Party.
