= Samala Sadasiva =

Telugu poet and writer

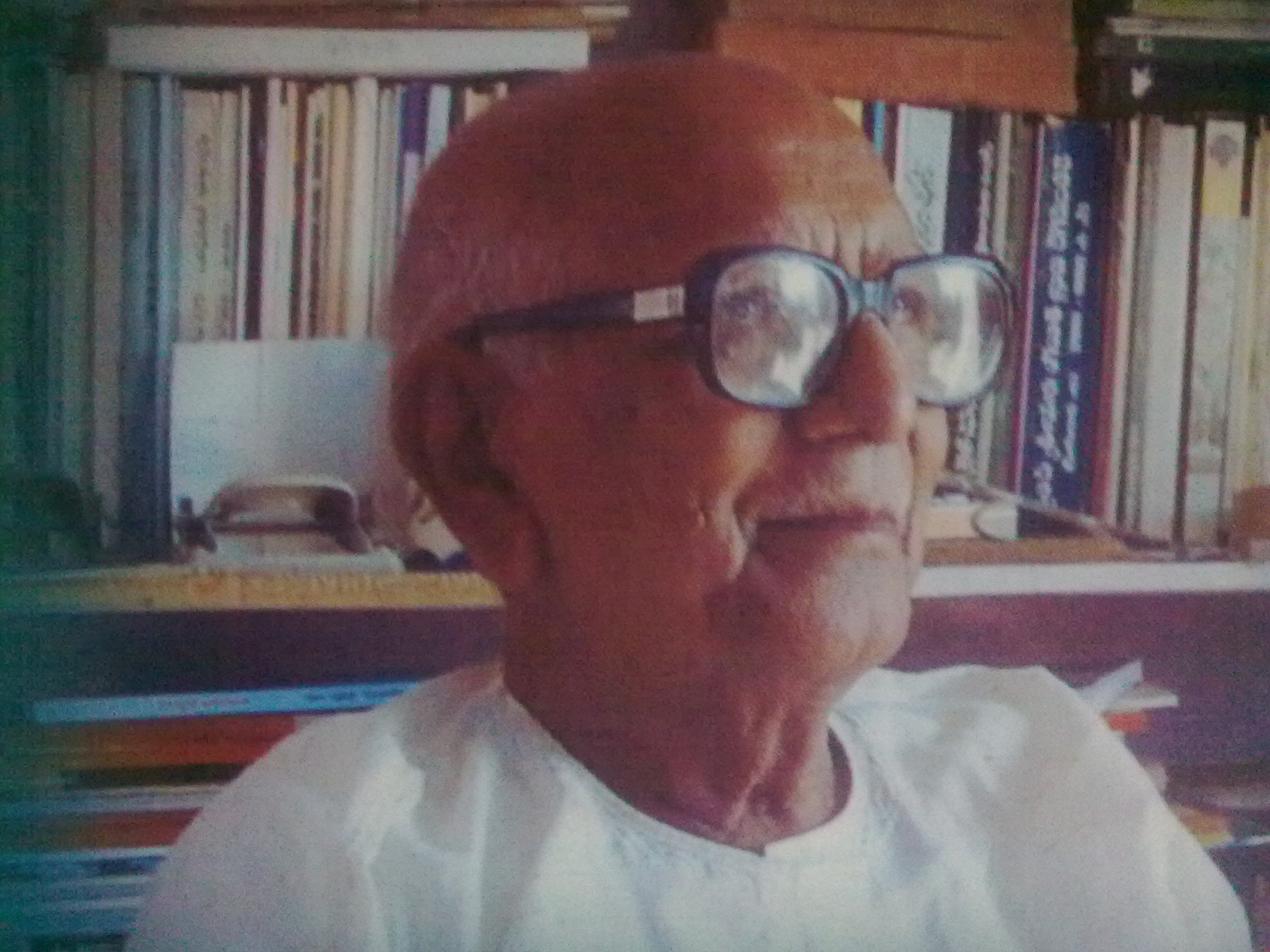
File.samalasadasiva

Samala Sadasiva (11 May 1928 – 7 August 2012) was a Telugu language poet and writer. He won the Sahitya Akademi Award in 2011.

== Born ==
He was born in Tenugupalle village in Dahegaon mandal in Komaram Bheem and worked as a Telugu teacher.

== Life ==
Sadasiva wrote over 425 books in various languages and translated books into Telugu from Hindi, Urdu, Sanskrit, Marathi, Persian, English and others. He was instrumental in including a lesson on Girijan leader Komaram Bheem in the school syllabus in Andhra Pradesh. Some of his works include Urdu Sahithya charitra, Amzad Rubayilu, Malayalamarathalu, Yaadhi, Sangeetha sikaraalu, etc.

He earned a doctorate from Potti Sreeramulu Telugu University in 1998 and Kakatiya University conferred him with a doctorate in 2002. In 2006, he got Rajiv Prathibha Puraskaram. A native of Cherupalli village of Dayagam mandal, He lived in Vidhyanagar in Adilabad town.

He won kendra sahithya academy award for his book on Hindustani music written in Telugu called Swara Layalu.He has got best translation award in 1964 for translation "Amzad Rubabulu" .

== Death ==
He died due to cardiac arrest at his home in Adilabad. He had died on 7 August 2012.

== Bibliography ==
- Swaralayaalu
- Yadi
- Malayamarutalu
- Sangitashikharalu
- Mirza Ghalib
- Amjad Rubabulu

samala

1. Urdu sahitya charitra
