= Sirpur (T) =

Sirpur (T) Sirpur Tandur, Sirpur Town
- Town
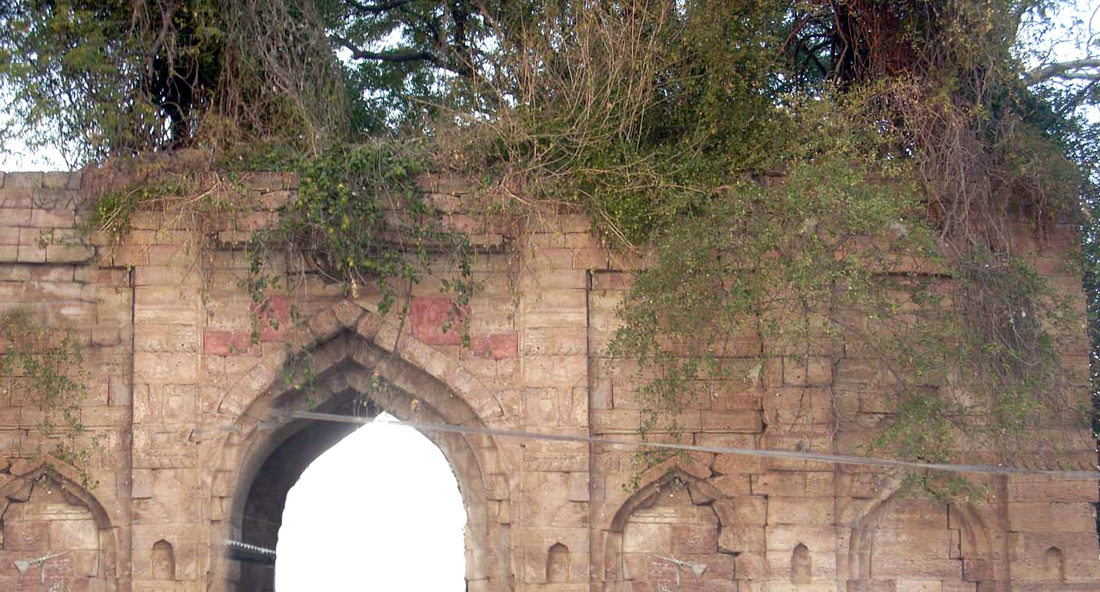
- Sirpur Fort

- Location in Telangana, India
- Coordinates: 19°28′31.686″N 79°34′13.449″E
- Country: India
- State: Telangana
- District: Komaram Bheem
- Mandal: Sirpur (T)

Government
  - Type: Gram panchayat
  - Body: Sirpur(T) Gram panchayat

Area
  - Total: 8.88 km^{2} (3.43 sq mi)
- Elevation: 184 m (604 ft)

Population (2011)
  - Total: 19,183

Languages
  - Official: Telugu
  - Others: Gondi, Marathi, Hindi, English
- Time zone: UTC+5:30 (IST)
- PIN: 504299
- Telephone code: 08738
- Vehicle registration: TG 20

Sirpur (T) is a town and a mandal in Komaram Bheem district of the Indian state of Telangana.

== History ==
Sirpur, formerly known as Suryapuram, was ruled by the Gond King, Ballala. The Gond King, Bhim Ballal Singh built Sirpur Fort in 9th century AD. The modern town grew around the fort.

In 1724 AD, Nizam-e-Mulk defeated Mubariz Khan and took possession of the Deccan and began to rule. In 1773, Mudhoji Bhonsle entered into an agreement with Nizam Ali Khan, Nizam of Hyderabad by which he agreed to cede Manikgarh (Rajura of Chandrapur) with surrounding territories south of Penganga to the Nizam, in return for the forts of Gavilgarh and Narnala of Amaravati district - Berar.

As a result of Third Anglo-Maratha War between the British and Raghoji II Bhonsle, the latter ceded the territory of Berar to British who, in turn, passed it on to Nizam under treaty and obligation for cooperation in war.

The area was initially a sub-district called Sirpur-Tandur carved out in 1872 and comprised Edlabad (Adilabad), Rajura (now in Maharashtra) and Sirpur taluks. Sirpur-Tandur was originally a district in Marathwada region. Later it was merged with Adilabad district of Telangana.

- In 2016, Komaram Bheem district was carved out of Adilabad district, and consequently, Sirpur now is in Komaram Bheem district.

== Geography ==
Sirpur is located at 19.4833°N 79.6000°E. It has an average elevation of 184 meters (603.675 feet). It is situated on the banks of river Wardha.

== Climate ==
All the three seasons are extreme in this region. Summer is extremely hot with temperatures exceeding 46 degrees due to the presence of Singareni Collieries nearby. December is usually the coldest month in this place with the temperature varying from 10 to 30 degrees Celsius.

== Transport ==
The town is connected to AP SH 1 at Rebbena through a road. Sirpur is connected to many cities in Telangana by the Telangana State Road Transport Corporation bus service.

Sirpur Town railway station is located on New Delhi–Chennai main line. It is administrated by South Central Railway zone. It is the last railway station in Telangana before crossing over to Maharashtra.

The nearest airport is Nagpur Airport (242 km away) and Hyderabad Airport (323 km away).

== Culture ==
=== Festivals ===
==== Dasra (Vijayadashami) ====
Vijayadashami is observed for different reasons and celebrated differently in various parts of South Asia. Vijayadashami marks the end of Durga Puja, remembering goddess Durga's victory over the buffalo demon Mahishasura to restore and protect dharma.[4][9] In these regions, it marks the end of "Ramlila" and remembers God Rama's victory over the Ravana. Alternatively, it marks a reverence for one of the aspects of goddess Devi such as Durga or Saraswati. Vijayadashami celebrations include processions to a river or ocean front that carry clay statues of Durga, Lakshmi, Saraswati, Ganesha and Kartikeya, accompanied by music and chants, after which the images are immersed into the water for dissolution and a goodbye. Elsewhere, on Dasara, the towering effigies of Ravana symbolizing the evil are burnt with fireworks marking evil's destruction. The festival also starts the preparation for one of the most important and widely celebrated Diwali, the festival of lights, which is celebrated twenty days after the Vijayadashami.

Bathukamma it is celebrated around the period of Dasra. This is a nine-day festival. The women participate in the bathukamma, and it is decorated with the flowers of thangadi, gunuka, thamara, chamanthi, etc. The nine days of Bathukamma are

First day: engili pulu
Second day: atukula bathukamma
Third day: muddapappu bathukamma
Fourth day: nanne biyyam bathukama
Fifth day: atla bathukamma
Sixth day: aligina bathukamma
Seventh day: vepakaya bathukamma
Eighth day: venne mudda bathukamma
Ninth day: saddula bathukamma

==== Pola ====
Pola is a bull-worshipping festival celebrated by farmers mainly in the Indian state of Maharashtra and Telangana. On the day of Pola, the farmers decorate and worship their bulls. Pola falls on the day of the Pithori Amavasya (the new moon day) in the month of Shravana (usually in August). Puran Poli, karanji, and curry with five vegetables are the main dishes associated with the festival.

=== Temples ===
- Dubbaguda Hanuman Temple
- Sirpur Balaji Temple
- Sri Ramacharla Anjaneya Swamy Devalayam
- Sri Shirdi Sai Baba Temple, Navegon
- Sri Siddi Tonkini Hanuman Temple
- Sri Venkateshwara Temple

== Education ==
This is a list of educational institutions in Sirpur.

- Eden Garden English Medium School
- Girls Upper Primary School
- Government Junior College
- Govt. Tribal Ashrama High School
- Govt Ashram Girls School
- MPP School, Dubbaguda
- MPUP School, Sonpet
- Social Welfare Residential School and Junior College
- Sri Sai Vidya Mandir
- Vikas Degree College
- Zilla Parishath High School

== Sirpur Assembly constituency ==
Sirpur is an assembly constituency in Telangana.

List of Elected Members:

- 1978 - K.V. Keshavulu
- 1983 and 1989 - K.V. Narayana Rao
- 1989 and 1999 - Palvai Purushotham Rao
- 1999 - Palvai Rajyalaxmi
- 2004 - Koneru Konappa
- 2009 - Kaveti Sammaih
- 2010 - Kaveti Sammaih
- 2014 - Koneru Konappa
- 2023 -DR.Palvai Harish Babu (bjp)

== Places of interest ==
- Sirpur Fort
- Sirpur Paper Mills, Kagaznagar
- Hudkuli Irrigation Project

== See also ==
- Kagaznagar
- Wardha River
- Pranhita River
