= Edavelly =

Village in Telangana, India

Edavelly is a village located in Rebbena Mandal of Adilabad district in the Indian state of Telangana.
