= Amurajula Sridevi =

Indian politician

Amurajula Sridevi (born 1972) is an Indian politician from Telangana. She is a former Member of the Legislative Assembly in 2004 representing Telugu Desam party.

Sridevi is from Bellampalli, Telangana. She married Amurajula Rajeshwar. She passed class 12 and discontinued her BA course from B.R. Ambedkar open University.

== Career ==
Sridevi won the 2004 Andhra Pradesh Legislative Assembly election from Asifabad Assembly constituency, which is reserved for Scheduled Caste community in the erstwhile Adilabad district, presently renamed as Komaram Bheem district. She polled 45,817 votes and defeated her nearest rival, Gunda Mallesh of the CPM by a margin of 5452 votes. Later, she joined Praja Rajyam Party but lost the 2009 election. In 2023, she contested and lost from Bellampally Assembly constituency on BJP ticket.
