= Sirpur Town railway station =

Railway station on the New Dehli-Chennai main line

General information
- Location: India
- Coordinates: 19.4833°N 79.6000°E
- Platforms: 2
- Tracks: 2

Construction
- Parking: Available (charges apply)

Other information
- Status: Active
- Station code: SRUR
- Fare zone: South Central Railway (SCR)
Location
- Location within Telangana Location within India

Sirpur Town railway station is a major station on New Delhi–Chennai main line in Secunderabad division of South Central Railway in Indian Railways. It serves the Sirpur (T) town in Komaram Bheem district in Telangana. The elevation of the railway station is 192 m above sea level. It is the last railway station in Telangana before crossing over to Maharashtra.
