= Savatula Gundam Waterfalls =

Savatula Gundam Waterfalls is one of many waterfalls located in Komaram Bheem district in the Indian state of Telangana. It is located 30 kilometres (19 miles) from Komaram Bheem and 350 kilometres (220 miles) from Hyderabad.

== See also ==
- List of waterfalls
- List of waterfalls in India
