= Gunda Mallesh =

Indian politician (1947–2020)

Member of the Andhra Pradesh Legislative Assembly
- In office 2009–2014
- Preceded by: Constituency established
- Succeeded by: Durgam Chinnaiah
- Constituency: Bellampalli
- In office 1994–1999
- Preceded by: Dasari Narasaiah
- Succeeded by: Dr Pati Subhadra
- In office 1985–1989
- In office 1983–1985
- Preceded by: Dasari Narsaiah
- Succeeded by: Dasari Narasaiah
- Constituency: Asifabad

Personal details
- Born: July 14, 1947 Rechini village, Tandur mandal, Adilabad district
- Died: October 13, 2020 (aged 73)

Gunda Mallesh (14 July 1947 - 13 October 2020) was an Indian politician and leader of Communist Party of India (CPI). He had won as the legislator in 1983, 1985 and 1994 from Asifabad constituency. In 2009, he was elected as the MLA of Bellampalli constituency, and served as the floor leader of the CPI.
