= Sirpur Paper Mills =

Pulp and paper company in Telangana, India

Sirpur Paper Mills Limited (SPM) is an integrated pulp and paper mill situated at Kagaznagar in Komaram Bheem district, Telangana. JK Paper Ltd acquired Sirpur Paper Mills in August 2018.

== Establishment ==
Sirpur Paper Mills Ltd. was established in the erstwhile Hyderabad State in 1938 by the Nizam of Hyderabad Mir Osman Ali Khan, with actual production beginning in 1942. This makes it one of the oldest paper mills in the country. In the 1950s, the Birla family group of industries took over the mill, and it was later transferred to the Poddars. It was owned by R. K. Poddar at the time of its closure.

== Closure ==
At the time of the closure, the mill employed about 3000 workers. The management team cited increasing raw material costs and unavailability of reliable power as the major reasons that impacted the profitability of the plant. Production at the mill had been shut down from September 2014 to August 2018.

== Acquisition by JK Paper ==
Efforts were started by the Kalvakuntla Chandrashekar Rao government in Telangana to attract new investors to restart production at the mill and boost the local economy, which was heavily dependent on it. The Harsh Pati Singhania-promoted JK Paper Ltd. has taken over the struggling Sirpur Paper Mills Ltd., an ailing paper mill located in Kagaznagar, Telangana. The takeover comes after the National Company Law Tribunal, Hyderabad, had on July 19 approved the Rs 782-crore resolution plan. According to the JK Paper management, “The acquisition provides a growth opportunity for JK Paper to expand its existing line of business of paper and paperboard.” The company has secured approval from the NCLT Hyderabad Bench and acquired a 76.37 percent stake comprising 13,90,00,000 shares of face value of Rs 10 each. JK Paper does not require approval from the Competition Commission of India, as the target business is within the prescribed exemption threshold as per the regulations. As per the arrangement, Rs 371 crore has been settled by the company and its JK Enviro-tech Ltd towards the corporate insolvency resolution process cost, admitted operational creditors, workmen and employees dues, among others, as per the terms of the Resolution Plan. This consists of a cash payment of Rs 165 crore and the issue of securities consisting of equity shares of Rs 43 crore and preference shares of Rs 162 crore by Sirpur Paper Mills Ltd. The company has issued equity shares of SPML through primary subscription at the face value of Rs 10 each. After the lenders lifted the seizure of the paper mills, Harsh Pati Singhania, vice-chairman and managing director of JK Paper, and others opened the paper mill, which will play a major role in the revival of the economy in the newly carved-out Komaram Bheem district, where the mill is located. Significantly, KT Rama Rao, Telangana IT and Industries Minister, and local MLA Koneru Konappa played a role in facilitating the takeover of the mill by ensuring that the state extends certain concessions, which will make the mill viable. JK Paper shares were trading at Rs 148.80, up 5.48 percent on the BSE.
