= Jainoor =

Town in Telangana, India

- Census town
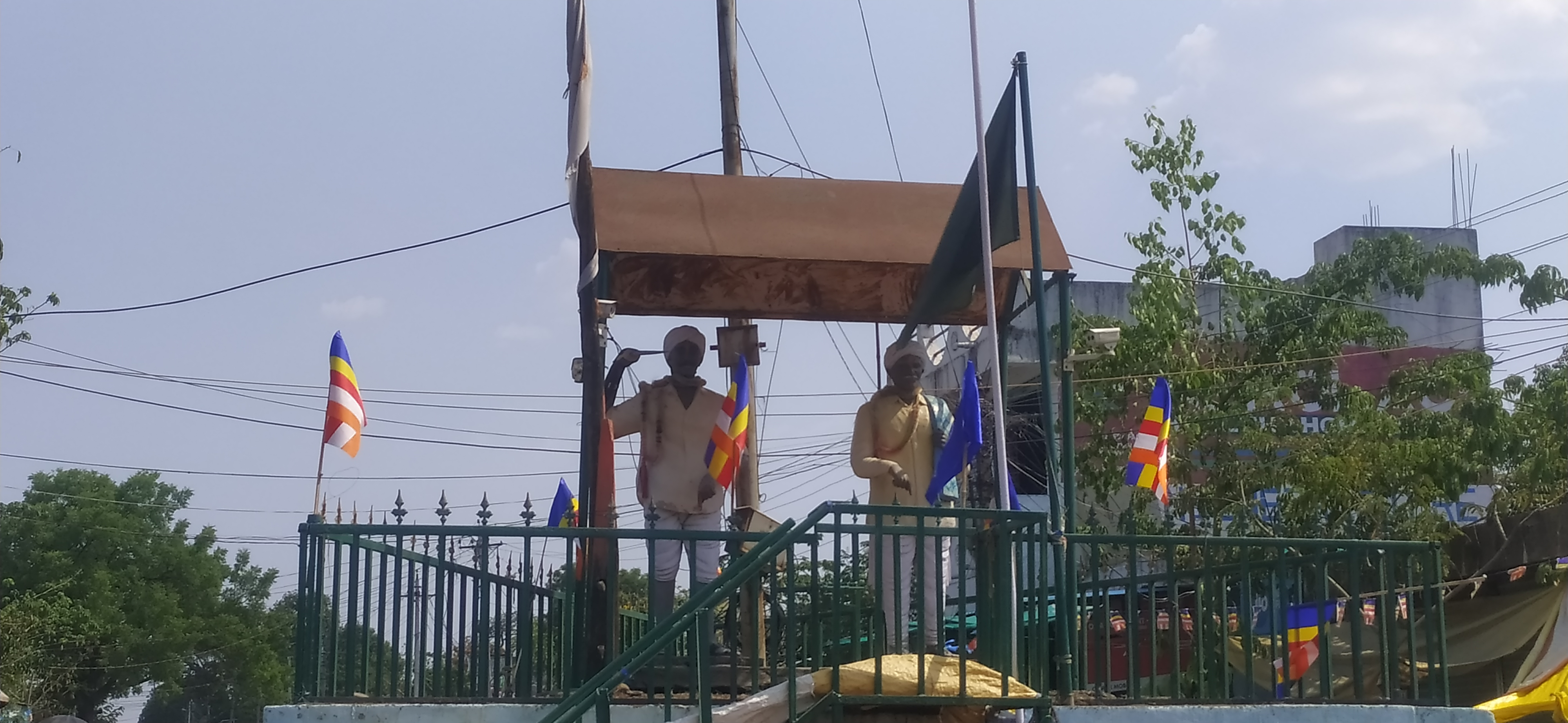

- Location in Telangana, India Jainoor (India)
- Coordinates: 19°23′53″N 78°58′15″E
- Country: India
- State: Telangana
- District: Komaram Bheem Asifabad

Area
  - Total: 2.56 km^{2} (0.99 sq mi)

Population (2011)
  - Total: 6,342
  - Density: 2,480/km^{2} (6,420/sq mi)

Languages
  - Official: Telugu, Urdu
- Time zone: UTC+5:30
- PIN: 504313
- Vehicle registration: TS–20
- Website: telangana.gov.in

Jainoor is a census town in Komaram Bheem district of the Indian state of Telangana.

It is a tribal area and the cotton cultivation is main livelihood for many people in this area.
