= Kerameri mandal =

Kerameri
- Mandal
- Nickname: Telangana Kashmir
- Location in Telangana, India Kerameri (India)
- Coordinates: 19.4333°N 79.0500°E
- Country: India
- State: Telangana
- District: Komaram Bheem Asifabad

Government
  - Type: TRS
  - Body: MP, MLA, MLC'S, ZPTC, MPTC
  - Rank: 9898
- Elevation: 282 m (925 ft)

Languages
  - Official: Telugu
- Time zone: UTC+5:30 (IST)
- Postal code: 504293
- Vehicle registration: TS01
- Climate: hot (Köppen)
- Website: telangana.gov.in

Kerameri or Kerimeri is a mandal in Komaram Bheem Asifabad district in the state of Telangana in India. It is also home to the Kumuram Bheem Tribal Museum.

== Villages ==
The villages in Kerameri mandal, Goyagaon, Karanjiwada, Kerameri, Kallegam, Bombeezari, patnapur, Khairi, Kothari, Modi, Nishani, Sangvi and Surdapur.

- Disputed 12&half Villages on State Border, which includes 8 Revenue villages and 6 sub:
1. Kotha Bk, (Rith)
2. MaharajGuda (1/2),
3. Mukdam Guda
4. Paramdoli & (Tanda),
5. Palas Guda,
6. Lendijjala,
7. Lendi Guda,
8. Padmawati,
9. Yessapur,
10. Antapur,
11. Bhola-Pathar,
12. Shankar-Lodhi &
13. Indiranagar.

=== Transport ===
Telangana's Kashmir "Kerameri" Ghat roads can be reached by Bus and trains.

By Road - They are number of buses from Hyderabad MGBS to Komaram Bheem. From Komaram Bheem we can reach this place within 40 minutes.

By Rail - Trains from Secunderabad to Nagpur stretch. Main stations to reach this place is Asifabad Road-ASAF, Sirpur Kaghaznagar-SKZR.
