= Sirpur (U) =

- Location within Telangana Location within India
- Coordinates: 19°20′21″N 78°56′50″E
- Country: India
- State: Telangana
- District: Kumuram Bheem Asifabad
- PIN: 504313

Sirpur (U) is a village and a mandal in Komaram Bheem district in the state of Telangana in India.

A Sri Shirdi Sai Baba temple is located in Sirpur (U) and shivalinge, Nandishwar temple in Sirpur u.

== Divisions ==
There are eleven gram panchayats in Sirpur (U) Mandal.

- Netnoor-B
- Mahagaon
- Netnur k
- koddiguda
- Pangidi
- Phullara
- Shettihadapnur
- Sirpur (U)
- Kohinoor-B
- Raghapur
- Sheethagondhi
- Pamulawada
- Bhurnoor-B
- Babjipet
