= Kova Laxmi =

Indian politician

Member of the Telangana Legislative Assembly
- Incumbent
- Assumed office 2023
- Constituency: Asifabad

Personal details
- Born: 1973 (age 52–53) Adilabad, India
- Party: Bharat Rashtra Samithi

Kova Laxmi (born 5 February 1973) is an Indian politician and a legislator of Telangana Legislative Assembly. She won as MLA from Asifabad on Bharat Rashtra Samithi. She was elected as Kumram Bheem Asifabad district Zilla Parishad Chairperson in 2019 and wins 2023 Asifabad Assembly Election.

== Early life ==
She was born in Asifabad, Telangana. She completed her Secondary School Certificate in Asifabad.

== Career ==
She won as MLA in 2014 from Asifabad assembly constituency.

== Personal life ==
She is married to Kova Sone Rao.
