= Kouthala mandal =

Coordinates: 19°31′N 79°44′E

Kouthala is a Mandal in Komaram Bheem district in the state of Telangana in India.

Koutala has the following temples:

- Shivalay temple
- Sai baba temple
- Sri Ramalayam temple
- Kanyaka parmeshwari temple
