= Tiryani =

- Village
- Location in Telangana, India Tiryani (India)
- Coordinates: 19.175°N 79.270°E
- Country: India
- State: Telangana
- District: Komaram bheem district
- Elevation: 450 m (1,480 ft)

Population (2011)
  - Total: 2,976

Languages :- Telugu .gondi.
  - Official: Telugu language Telugu .gondi.manne.kolam
- Time zone: UTC+5:30 (IST)
- PIN 504297: 504297
- Vehicle registration: TS
- Website: telangana.gov.in

Tiryani is a village and a deep forest area in Komaram Bheem district. Schedule tribes are the majority people in this mandal who live by hunting animals and the great Arjun valley locates 12 km from the mandal headquarters where the Pandavas in Mahabharatha did a Vanavasa (exile).
