= Kagaznagar, Telangana =

Sirpur-Kaghaznagar
- Town
- Location in Telangana State, India Sirpur-Kaghaznagar (India)
- Coordinates: 19.3333°N 79.4833°E
- Country: India
- State: Telangana
- District: Komaram Bheem

Government
  - Type: Chairman-Council
  - Body: Kagaznagar Municipal Council

Area
  - Total: 8.31 km^{2} (3.21 sq mi)
- Elevation: 174 m (571 ft)

Population (2011)
  - Total: 57,583
  - Rank: 35th (Telangana)
  - Density: 6,930/km^{2} (17,900/sq mi)

Languages
  - Official: Telugu, Hindi, Urdu, Gondi, Marathi, Bengali
- Time zone: UTC+5:30 (IST)
- PIN: 504296
- Area code: +91-8738
- Vehicle registration: TG-20
- Website: kagaznagarmunicipality.telangana.gov.in

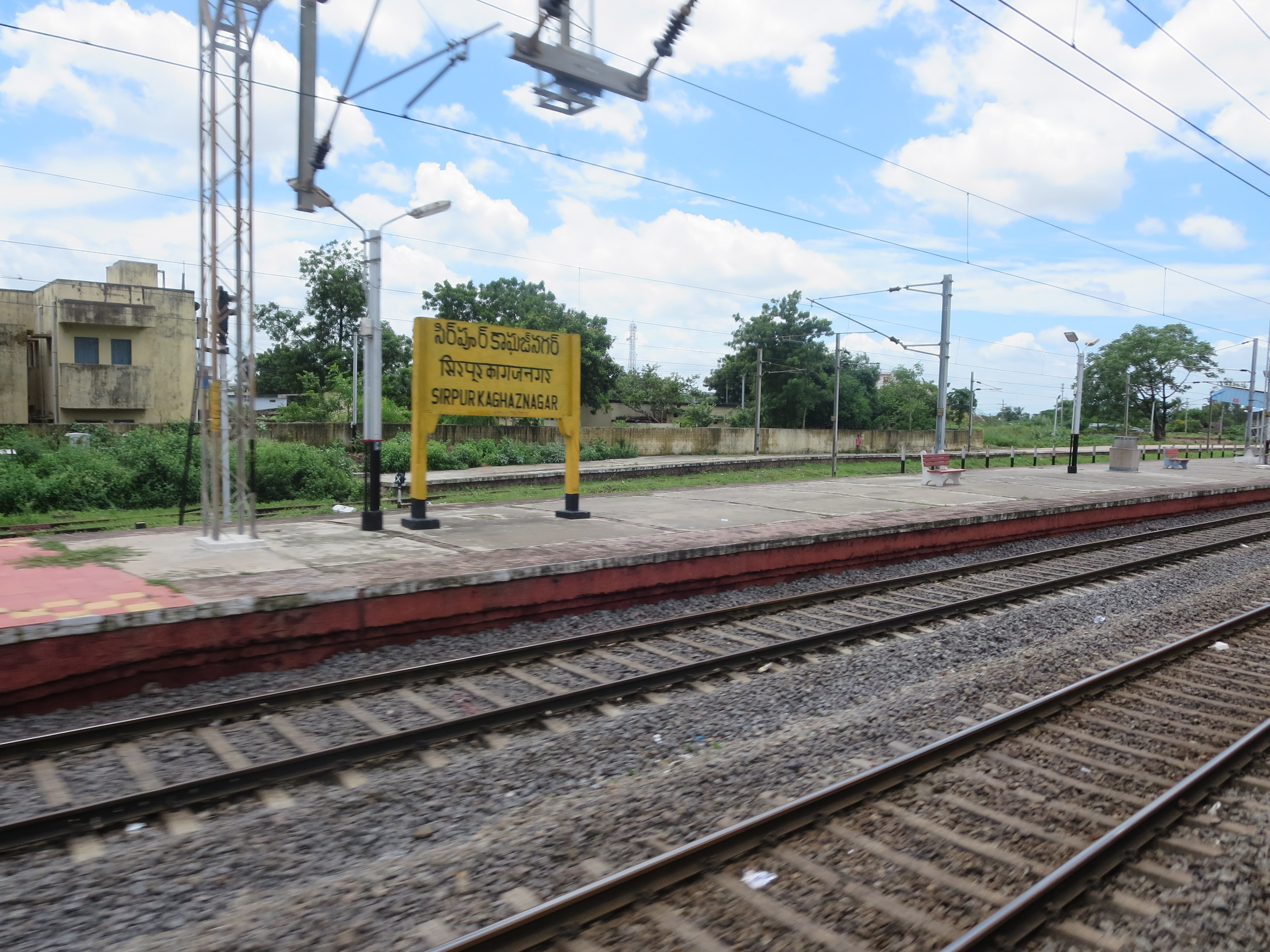
Sirpur nameplate

Sirpur-Kaghaznagar is a town and a municipality in Komaram Bheem Asifabad district in the state of Telangana in India. It is located about 297 kilometres from the state capital, Hyderabad, 140 kilometres from Karimnagar, 90 km from Chandrapur and 250 kilometres from Nagpur.

== History ==
Sirpur, formerly known as Suryapuram, was ruled by the Gond King, Ballala. The Gond King, Bhim Ballal Sing built Sirpur Fort in 9th century AD. The town derives its name from the paper factory established during the times of Nizams rule.

The area was initially a sub-district called Sirpur-Tandur carved out in 1872 and comprised Edlabad (Adilabad), Rajura (now in Maharashtra) and Sirpur taluks. Sirpur-Tandur was originally a district in Maratwada region. Later it was merged with Adilabad district of Telangana.

- In 2016, Komaram Bheem district was carved out of Adilabad district, and consequently, Sirpur Kaghaznagar now is in Komaram Bheem district.

== Geography ==
Sirpur Kagaznagar is located at 19.3333°N 79.4833°E. It has an average elevation of 174 meters (574 feet).

== Topography ==
Sirpur Kaghaznagar is surrounded by Major rivers like Wardha/Penganga river on northern side, Pranhita in eastern side and Pedda vagu river which runs through the town and rich forest

There is scope to make this forest Wild Life Sanctuary which will can generate tourism via Safari, Waterfall Trekking and Bird watching.

== Demographics ==
As of 2011 India census, the town of Sirpur Kagaznagar had a population of 66,293, with 33,124 males, and 33,169 females. There were a total of 5,576 children between the ages of 0 and 6 and 15,712 inhabitants were classified as illiterate. The town has a unique blend of people settled from different parts of India. Apart from Telugu, Hindi, Urdu and Gondi, Marathi is also widely understood due to the town's proximity to Maharashtra. Bengali language is widely spoken in Easgaon village owing to settlement of Bengali refugees. The literacy rate stood at 73.07 percent.

The majority of people in the area practice Hinduism, followed by Islam and Christianity. Telugu is the most widely spoken language.

== Economy ==
The local economy was almost completely dependent on manufacturing at Sirpur Paper Mills which has been acquired by J. K. Organisation and has been restarted in August 2018 with production likely to begin from April 2019. Sirsilk Textile Factory is closed, but Koneru Konappa, the previous MLA of the area claimed that he will reopen it. Presently the entire economy is run by agriculture allied activities and also the Real Estate is growing very fast. The Town is surrounded by Many Rice Mills and Jinning Mills.

== Education ==
This is a list of educational institutions in Kaghaznagar.

- Jawahar Navodaya Vidyalaya (CBSE Central Govt school)
- Eklavya Model Residential School (CBSE Central Govt Tribal school)
- Fatima Convent High School (state board)
- St Claret High School (CBSE)
- JK Laxmipat Singhania DAV Public school (CBSE)
- Kendriya Vidyalaya (proposed Central Govt school)
- Bala Bharthi High school (EM and Telugu Medium)
- Sarasvathi Shishu Mandir High school (EM and Telugu Medium)
- Krishnaveni High school
- Shishu mandir High school
- Kerala Public school
- Madarsa Makhzanul uloom
- Iqbal School
- Anwar Urdu High School
- Moulana School
- SKE Degree college
- Vivekananda Degree college
- Govt Degree and Junior college
- Vasundhara Degree college
- Govt Medical College Asifabad (25 km)

== Important places ==
- Trishul Pahad
- kosni Dam
- Sri Balaji Venkateshwara Swamy Devasthanam, Gangapur
- Shiva Mallana Devasthanam, Easgoan.
- Peddavagu river
- Tonkini Hanuman Mandir
- Vulture sightings near Palarapugutta cliff (Bejjur)
- Sirpur and Penchikalpet Forest
- Ada Dam
- Tiryani waterfall
- Pranhita River Pushkaralu
- Jodeghat valley, Babajhari water falls (25 km)
- Kumarambheem Tribal museum
- Sirpur Fort
- Qadeem Eid gah
- SPM Jama Masjid

Popular Places to visit from skzr

- Kawal Tiger reserve (50 km)
- Tadoba Tiger reserve (50 km)
- Lakshmi Narasimha Temple, Dharmapuri (106 km)
- Markanda Mahadev, Chamorshi (104 km)
- Mahakali Temple, Chandrapur (100 km)
- Kamlapur Hatti camp (100 km)
- Lok Biradari Prakalp Hemalkasa (135 km)
- Tippeshwar Wild Life Sanctuary (150 km)
- Hemachala Lakshmi Narsimha Swamy (249 km)
- Sita Ramachandraswamy Temple, Bhadrachalam and Papikondalu
- Jagdalpur

== Culture ==
=== Festivals ===
==== Dasra (Vijayadashami) ====
Every year on vijayadashmi ravan dahan happens on Trishul Pahad.

Bathukamma it is celebrated around the period of Dasra. This is a nine-day festival. The women participate in the bathukamma, and it is decorated with the flowers of thangadi, gunuka, thamara, chamanthi, etc. The nine days of Bathukamma are

==== Shivaratri Jatra (Easgoan Temple) ====
Every year Shivaratri is celebrated at ancient Shiva Mallanna Temple located in Easgoan with 3 days long Jatra.

==== Pranhita Pushkaralu ====
Pranahita Pushkaralu is a festival of River Pranahita normally occurs once in 12 years. The Pushkaram is observed for a period of 12 days from the time of entry of Jupiter into Pisces (Meena rasi).[2]

As per Telugu culture, there are 12 sacred rivers across the country that go for a cycle what is called as “Pushakaram”. Each among those 12 rivers goes for the Pushkaram, in the order of one at a year. They are Ganga, Yamuna, Saraswati, Godavari, Sindhu, Narmada, Kaveri, Krishna, Tapti, Tungabhadra, Bheema and Pranahita.

List of Major Ghats Tummidi Hatti, Arjunigutta, Vemanpalli

==== Sri Rama Navami ====
As per Telugu culture Sri Rama Kalyanam is performed at all sri rama temples in the town.Railway colony is the famous for Kalyanam.

==== Chhath pooja ====
Chhath pooja is celebrated by the communities from UP and Bihar working in paper mills at SPM Garden every year.

==== Gangapur Jatara ====
The ancient Sri Balaji Venkateshwara Swamy Devasthanam of Gangapur village in Rebbana mandal is being spruced up for the three-day-long annual Jathara in every year.

==== Kali Puja ====
Celebration in Easgaon, Durga Nagar, and Ram Nagar

In the Bengali communities of Easgaon, Durga Nagar, and Ram Nagar, Kali Puja is celebrated as a major annual festival spanning five days. The celebrations include a combination of traditional rituals and modern cultural programs, such as music, dance, and community feasts. For the Bengali residents in these areas, it is one of the most vibrant festivals of the year, fostering strong community participation and festive spirit.

==== Durga Puja ====
Durga Puja in Durganagar and Ram Nagar

Durga Puja is a major festival for the Bengali communities in Durganagar (Village No. 5) and Ram Nagar (Village No. 12). The festivities span five days and include elaborate rituals, cultural performances, and public gatherings. On Dashami, the final day of the festival, a dramatic effigy of Ravana is burned in Ram Nagar, drawing large crowds from surrounding villages. It is common for thousands of people to attend, with many parking their vehicles up to 4 kilometers away and walking to the event grounds, reflecting the scale and popularity of the celebration in the region.

== Transport ==
The Town is connected to many cities in Telangana by the Telangana State Road Transport Corporation bus service. It is well connected to

- Hyderabad (290 km), Karimnagar (150 km), Warangal (150 km), Mancherial (60 km) on south
- Nagpur (250 km), Chandrapur (90 km) on the North
- Aheri (68 km), Allapalli (75 km) on the east
- Adilabad (150 km) on west.

Kaghaznagar is flanked on one side by National Highway 363 part of Nagpur-Vijayawada Express way and Raipur–Hyderabad Expressway which will pass near town is sanctioned.

National Highway 130D (India) which is under construction once completed this will provide Sirpur-Kaghaznagar region connectivity to Chhattisgarh (Kondagoan/Narayanpur) and further to Odisha and Araku valley (Vizag) AP.

MP Godam Nagesh and MLA Harish Palvai Proposed to extend NH 130D (Allapalli) to Gudihatnoor(NH-44) via Sirpur and Asifabad as Brownfield Highway

Town is Connected to Maharashtra Gondpipari/Gadchiroli via Venkatraopet-Polsa Interstate Bridge over Penganga river near Tonkini

Town is Connected to Maharastra Aheri/Allapalli via Gudem-Aheri Interstate Bridge over Pranhita river

Nearby National Highways National Highway 353B (India) Ashti - Rajura - Adilabad Highway National Highway 63 (India) Jagdalpur - Mancherial - Nizamabad

=== Rail ===
The town is served by Sirpur Kaghaznagar railway station which lies on New Delhi–Chennai main line. It is administered by South Central Railway zone. It is well connected to all over India. It is an NSG4 category railway station in Secunderabad division of SCR railway with Potential stoppage of trains.

Number of Halting Trains: 130 Number of Originating Trains: 3

=== Air ===
The nearest airport is Nagpur Airport (257 km away) and Hyderabad Airport (340 km away) and yet to be constructed Warangal Airport (200 kms)

There is Proposal to build Chadrapur Airport. Similarly, the existing airport in Adilabad district is being revived. under UDAAN Scheme.

The town Sirpur had Aerodrome to cater the business of Sirpur Paper mills and Sirpur Silk mills used by last Nizam and GD Birla.

Warangal Airport, the pre-independence era airport in India, was built at Mamnoor in Warangal district, in 1930 by British later It was commissioned by the last Nizam, Mir Osman Ali Khan, along with one at Solapur, to benefit the businesses, at Kagaznagar for the paper industry's convenience.

== Sirpur Assembly constituency ==
Sirpur Assembly constituency is an assembly constituency in Telangana.

== Civic administration ==
Kagaznagar Municipality was constituted in 1956 and is classified as a third grade municipality with 30 election wards. The jurisdiction of the civic body is spread over an area of 8.31 km^{2} (3.21 mi^{2}).
