= Bejjur mandal =

Bejjur
- mandal
- Location in Telangana, India Bejjur (India)
- Coordinates: 19°27′22″N 79°46′52″E
- Country: India
- State: Telangana
- District: Komaram Bheem

Government
  - Type: Panchayat raj
  - Body: Gram panchayat

Population (2011)
  - Total: 5,154

Languages
  - Official: Telugu
- Time zone: UTC+5:30 (IST)
- Vehicle registration: TS 20
- Climate: hot (Köppen)

Bejjur is a mandal in Komaram Bheem district in the state of Telangana in India.

== Demographics ==
According to Indian census, 2001, the demographic details of Bejjur mandal is as follows:

- Total Population: 42,796 in 8,973 Households.
- Male Population: 21,356 and Female Population: 21,440
- Children Under 6-years of age: 7,546 (Boys - 3,760 and Girls - 3,786)
- Total Literates: 11,240
