= Dahegaon, Komaram Bheem =

Dahegaon
- Tehsil
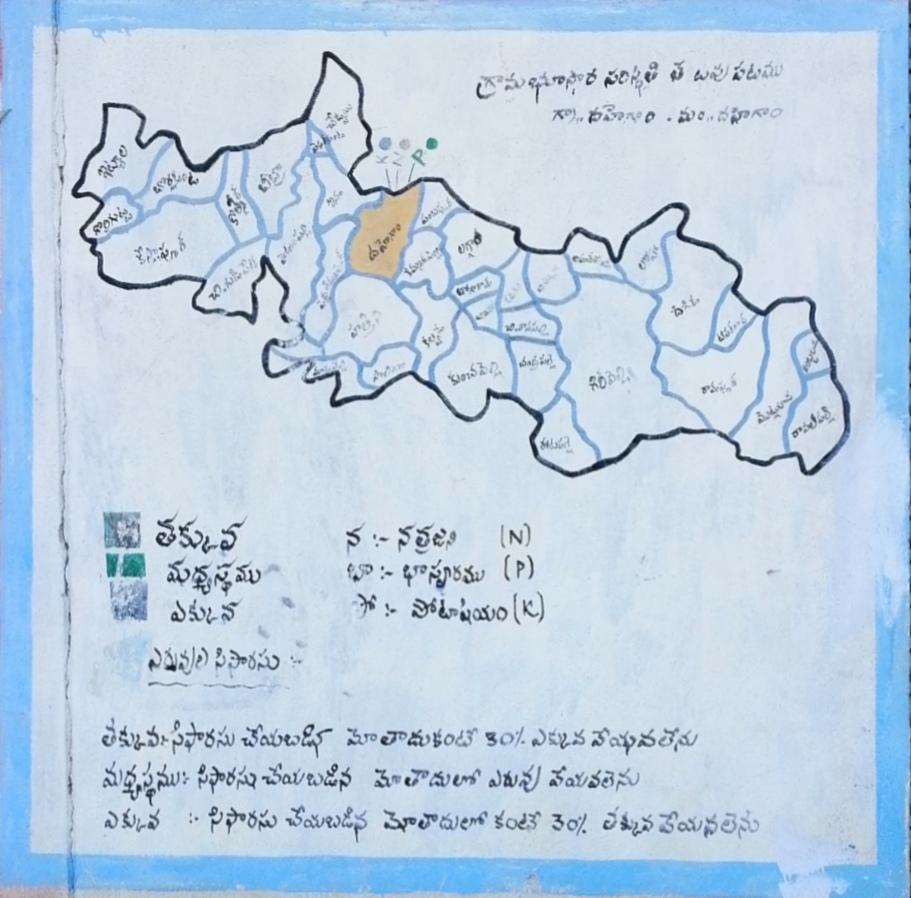
- Map of Dahegaon mandal and villages

- Location in Telangana, India Dahegaon (India)
- Coordinates: 19.257236°N 79.714915°E
- Country: India
- State: Telangana
- District: Komaram Bheem

Population (2011)
  - Total: 34,712 (of mandal)
- Time zone: UTC+5:30 (IST)
- Postal code: 504273

Dahegaon is a village and a mandal in Komaram Bheem district of Telangana state, India. It comes under Kagaznagar Revenue division.

== Geography ==
Kagaznagar, Bellampalle, Mandamarri and Mancherial are the nearby towns to Dahegaon. Dahegaon Mandal is surrounded by Bheemini Mandal towards west, Vemanpally Mandal towards south, Bejjur Mandal towards North and Nennel Mandal towards south.

== Villages in Dahegaon mandal ==
1. Gorregutta
2. Borlakunta
3. Kothmir
4. Beebra
5. Pesarkunta
6. Ainam
7. Polampalle
8. Hathni
9. Kalwada
10. Dahegaon
11. Pambapur
12. Kammarpalle
13. Laggaon
14. Bhogaram
15. Vodduguda
16. Brahmanchichal
17. Bhamanagar
18. Kunchavelli
19. Chandrapalle
20. Etapalle
21. Girvelli
22. Chinnaraspalle
23. Amargonda
24. Loha
25. Digida
26. Teepergaon
27. Rampur
28. Dubbaguda
29. Itial
30. Motlaguda
31. Ravalpalle
