= Koneru Konappa =

Indian politician and legislator

Koneru Konappa కోనేరు కోనప్ప

Member of Telangana Legislative Assembly
- In office 2 June 2014 – 3 December 2023
- Preceded by: Telangana Legislative Assembly
- Succeeded by: Palvai Harish Babu
- Constituency: Siripuram

Member of Legislative Assembly Andhra Pradesh
- In office 2004 - 2009
- Preceded by: Palvai Rajyalakshmi
- Succeeded by: K. Sammaiah
- Constituency: Siripuram

Personal details
- Born: Adilabad, India
- Party: Indian National Congress
- Other political affiliations: Bharata Rashtra Samithi

Koneru Konappa is an Indian politician and a legislator of Telangana Legislature. He won from Sirpur on BSP ticket but joined Telangana Rashtra Samithi. and then he recently lost the elections and joins the congress party on 15 March 2024 and resigned to congress on 21 February 2025 ahead of MLC Elections.

== Electoral History ==
=== Legislative Assembly ===
Year	Constituency	Party	Votes	%	Opponent	Party	Votes	%	Result	Margin	%
2023	Sirpur	BRS	60,614	32.43	Palvai Harish Babu	BJP	63,702	34.09	Lost	-3,088	-1.66
2018	Sirpur	TRS	83,088	50.57	Palvai Harish Babu	INC	59,052	35.94	Won	+24,036	+14.63
2014	Sirpur	BSP	49,033	32.41	Kaveti Sammaiah	TRS	40,196	26.57	Won	+8,837	+5.84
2009	Sirpur	INC	40,564	32.73	Kaveti Sammaiah	TRS	47,978	38.71	Lost	-7,414	-5.98
2004	Sirpur	INC	55,938	48.04	Palvai Rajya Laxmi	TDP	51,619	44.33	Won	+4,319	+3.71
1999	Sirpur	INC	27,351	28.06	Palvai Rajya Laxmi	TDP	57,318	58.81	Lost	-29,967	-30.75
