= Asifabad, Telangana =

Asifabad Jangam
- Municipality
- Asifabad (Telangana) Asifabad (India)
- Coordinates: 19.365°N 79.274°E
- Country: India
- State: Telangana
- District: Kumuram Bheem

Government
  - Type: Municipal Council Asifabad
  - Body: Asifabad Municipality
  - MLA: Kova Laxmi

Area
  - Total: 35.70 km^{2} (13.78 sq mi)

Population (2017)
  - Total: 55,254
  - Rank: 73 in (Telangana)
  - Density: 1,548/km^{2} (4,009/sq mi)

Languages
  - Official: Telugu
- Time zone: UTC+5:30 (IST)
- PIN: 504293
- Vehicle registration: TG 20
- Website: Official site

Asifabad, formerly known as Jangam or Jungum, is a city and the district headquarters of Kumuram Bheem district in the Indian state of Telangana. It is located in Asifabad mandal of Asifabad revenue division. It is situated on the banks of Peddavagu river.

== History ==
Historical population
Year	Pop.	±%
1991	14,971	—
2001	19,330	+29.1%
2011	23,059	+19.3%

Asifabad town, the eponymous element, was historically known as Jangam or Jungam in the early 1900s and served as a taluk headquarters under Nizam rule before integration into Adilabad district post-independence, reflecting administrative continuity in the naming convention.

Asifabad was ruled by many dynasties like the Kakatiyas, Mauryas, Satavahanas, Chalukyas, Qutub Shahis & Asaf Jahis, Gond rajas. In 1905, Asifabad was carved as a district but was later merged into the Adilabad district. In 1913, it was made as headquarters of the district prior to the status being lost to Adilabad in 1941. It was again carved from Adilabad district in 2016.

== Geography ==
Asifabad is located at 19.365°N 79.274°E. It has an average elevation of 218 metres (715 feet). Temperatures range from 2-10°C in winter to almost 45°C during the hottest days of summer.

== Demographics ==
As per 2011 India census, Asifabad had a population of 23,059. Males constitute 52% of the population and females constitute 48% of the population. Asifabad has an average literacy rate of 62%, with 59% of the males and 41% of females literate.

== Languages ==
Telugu is the most spoken language in town. Due to geographical proximity with Maharashtra, Gondi, Marathi is also widely spoken and understood. Other languages spoken here the native Gondi and Hindi.

== Transport ==
Nagpur–Vijayawada Expressway passes through Asifabad and National Highway 363 passes through Asifabad. Asifabad is connected to cities and surrounding villages in Telangana by the Telangana State Road Transport Corporation bus depot.The Nizam State Railways - Road Transport Division established the First bus depot in Asifabad.

=== Rail ===
The town is served by Asifabad Road [ASAF] railway station which is located 19 km away at Rebbena. However Sirpur Kaghaznagar [SKZR] railway station provides good connectivity with Asifabad town and its A+ category station located 28 km from Asifabad. The railway station lies on New Delhi–Chennai main line. It is administered by South Central Railway zone, Secunderabad division.

=== Air ===
The nearest airport is Nagpur Airport (231 km away) and Hyderabad Airport (309 km away).

== Culture ==
- Hanuman temple
- Kanyaka Parameshwari temple
- Keshavnath temple
- Baleshwara temple
- Jangu Bai mahal

== Education ==
Educational institutions in the city include:

- Konda Laxman Bapuji Government Medical College, Asifabad
- Government Nursing College, Asifabad
- Government DIET College, Asifabad
- Government Boys High School
- Government Girls High School
- Sree Saraswati Sishu Mandir
- Sree Vasavi Vidhya Mandir High School
- St Marys High School
- Holy Trinity School, Asifabad
- St Joels EM High School
- Sri Chaitanya Inter And Degree College
- Matrusri Degree College

== Notable people ==
- Komaram Bheem, freedom fighter
- Konda Laxman Bapuji, freedom fighter

== See also ==
- Komaram Bheem district
- List of cities in Telangana by population
