= Rebbena =

Coordinates: 19°08′29″N 79°43′05″E

Rebbena is a village and a mandal of Komaram Bheem district in the state of Telangana in India.

The Lord Venkateshwara temple in Gangapur village, 3 km away, is a major religious place. This temple was built in the 16th century by a Vishwabrahmin Mummadi Pothaji and large number of devotees come from all over Telangana and Andhra as well as from Maharashtra and Chhattisgarh to Gangapur jatra held on Magha pournima every year.

The Asifabad Road railway station is situated at Rebbena. This is the nearest railway station to Asifabad.
