= Komaram Bheem Asifabad district =

Kumuram Bheem Asifabad district
- District of Telangana
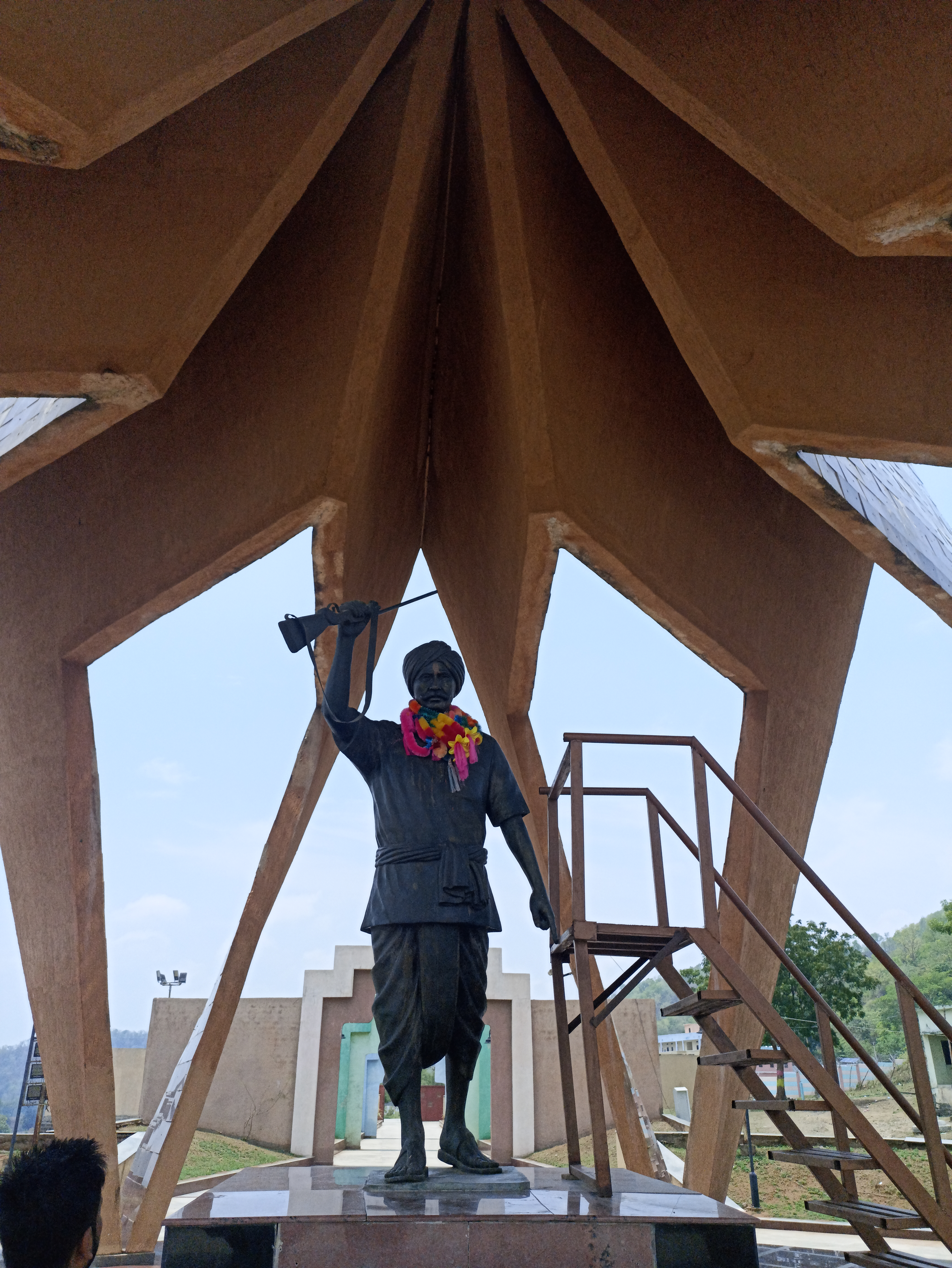
- Statue of Komaram Bheem at Jodeghat

- Country: India
- State: Telangana
- Named for: Komaram Bheem
- Headquarters: Asifabad
- Mandalas: 15

Government
  - District collector: Venkatesh Dhotre, I.A.S
  - Parliament Constituencies: Adilabad
  - Assembly constituencies: Asifabad, Sirpur
  - MP: Godam Nagesh

Area
  - Total: 4,878 km^{2} (1,883 sq mi)

Population (2011)
  - Total: 515,812
  - Density: 105.7/km^{2} (273.9/sq mi)
  - Urban: 86,984(16.86%)
- Time zone: UTC+05:30 (IST)
- Vehicle registration: TG 20
- Major highways: NH 63
- Website: asifabad.telangana.gov.in

Kumuram Bheem Asifabad district is a district in the Indian state of Telangana. The town of Asifabad is its district headquarters and Sirpur-Kagaznagar as its largest town. It is named after Gond tribal leader Kumuram Bheem.Kumuram bheem asifabad district is located northern parts of state.The district share boundaries with Adilabad, Nirmal, Mancherial districts and with the state boundary of Maharashtra. It is the second most backward district in India, according to the 2018 NITI Aayog ranking.

== History ==
The predominantly tribal region around the town of Asifabad was ruled by many dynasties like the Kakatiyas, Mauryas, Satavahanas, Chalukyas, Qutub Shahis, Asaf Jahis and Gonds. In the early 20th century, the district was known as Jangam and Asifabad served as its headquarters. In 1905, the district was merged into the neighbouring Adilabad district. In 1913, Asifabad was made as headquarters of the district prior to the status being lost to Adilabad town in 1941. Following the creation of Telangana state, the districts were re-organized in 2016. As a result, Asifabad district was again carved from Adilabad district and was renamed after the Gond martyr Komaram Bheem.

== Geography ==
The district is spread over an area of 4,300 square kilometres (1,700 sq mi). Hills dominate the western part of the district and Pranhita river runs parallel to the east.

It is home to endangered species of vultures which have made Palarapu rocks their home in the forests of Bejjur. The Sirpur forest is also home to tigers and other wild animals. Cotton and Paddy are the major crops grown in this area.

== Demographics ==
Religion in Komaram Bheem district (2011)
| Hinduism | 89.05% |
| Islam | 8.17% |
| Buddhism | 1.52% |
| Christianity | 0.44% |
| Other or not stated | 0.82% |

As of the 2011 Census, the district has a population of 515,812. Komaram Bheem district has a sex ratio of 998 females for every 1000 males and a literacy rate of 56.72%. 66,206 (12.84%) were under 6 years of age. 428,828 (83.14%) lived in rural areas. 86,984 (16.86%) lived in urban areas. Scheduled Castes and Scheduled Tribes make up 81,596 (15.82%) and 133,627 (25.91%) of the population respectively.

Languages of Komaram Bheem district (2011)
1. Telugu (37.4%)
2. Marathi (27.9%)
3. Gondi (12.5%)
4. Urdu (7.27%)
5. Lambadi (3.73%)
6. Bengali (3.51%)
7. Kolami (3.05%)
8. Koya (2.53%)
9. Hindi (1.46%)
10. Others (0.76%)

At the time of the 2011 census, 37.36% of the population spoke Telugu, 27.85% Marathi, 12.48% Gondi, 7.27% Urdu, 3.73% Lambadi, 3.51% Bengali, 3.05% Kolami, 2.53% Koya and 1.46% Hindi as their first language.

== Divisions ==
This district has two revenue divisions; Asifabad and Kagaznagar and is sub-divided into 15 mandals. Present MLA of Asifabad constituency is kova laxmi and Sirpur-T is P harish babu

=== Mandals ===
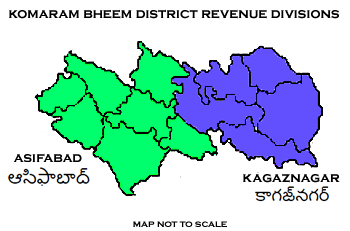
Komaram Bheem district revenue divisions

| S.No. | Asifabad revenue division | Kagaznagar revenue division |
|---|---|---|
| 1 | Asifabad | Kagaznagar |
| 2 | Lingapur | Penchicalpet |
| 3 | Jainoor | Bejjur |
| 4 | Tiryani | Kouthala |
| 5 | Wankidi | Chintalamanepally |
| 6 | Kerameri | Dahegaon |
| 7 | Sirpur (U) | Sirpur (T) |
| 8 | Rebbena | |

Asifabad Road railway station(ASAF): is in Rebbena

Sirpur kagaznagar railway station(SKZR): kagaznagar

sirpur town railway station(SRUR) : sirpur

== Notable people ==
- Komaram Bheem, freedom fighter
- Konda Laxman Bapuji, freedom fighter

== Places of interest ==
- Jode ghat
- Komaram Bheem reservoir
- Komaram Bheem waterfalls
- Vattivagu reservoir
- Gangapur temple, Rebbena
- Jodeghat, Kerameri
- Kadamba forest reserve, a tiger reserve
- Kerameri ghats
- Komaram Bheem irrigational project
- Palarapuguttalu, a vulture reserve
- Savatula Gundam Waterfalls
- Shiva Mallana temple
- Shivakeshava temple, Wankidi
- Sirpur forest reserve
- Thrishul Pahad
- Tonkini Hanuman temple, Sirpur-T

== See also ==
- List of districts in Telangana
