= Khajaguda Talab =

- Pedda Cheruvu
- ఖజగూడ తలాబ్ (Telugu)
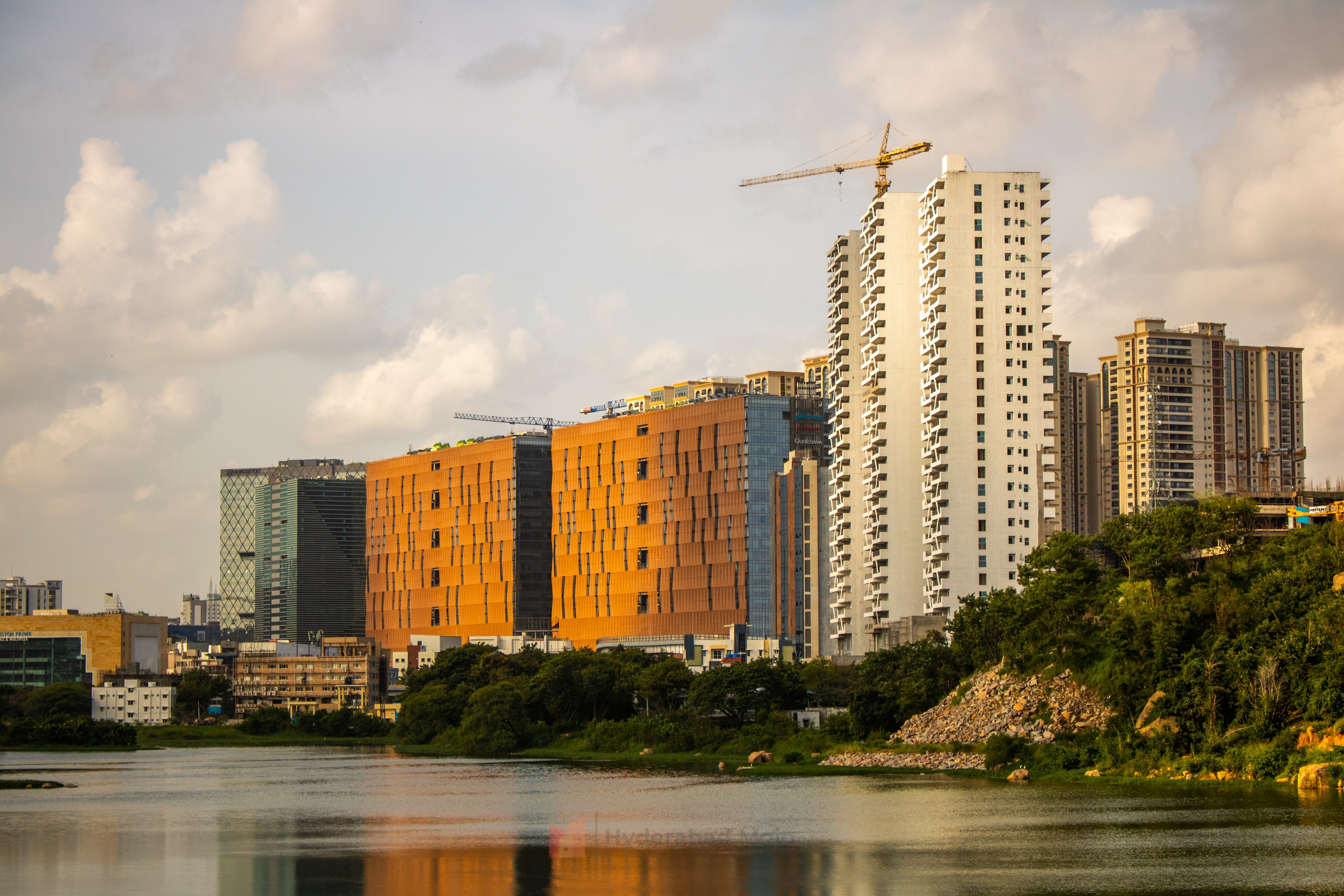

- Location in Telangana Khajaguda Talab (India)
- Location: Ranga Reddy, Hyderabad
- Coordinates: 17.4148017°N 78.3573688°E
- Type: Natural lake

Khajaguda Talab, also known as Pedda Cheruvu, is a small lake in Ranga Reddy District in the Indian state of Telangana and on the western edge of the city of Hyderabad, in the suburb of Manikonda, in the middle of Khajaguda area. It is situated near to Engineering Staff College of India and CARE Hospitals. DSR The First, a residential Apartment is located near the eastern edge of this lake. Khajaguda Talab is one of the few lakes in the twin cities which is linear in shape.

== Developments and Conservation ==
In 2019, the lake has come under pressure, as building companies have been reported to be filling up the lake with earth movers. The NGO "Save Our Urban Lakes" has called for meeting with authorities to assess the gravity of the situation. The GHMC is remediating the lake, and the American Telugu association is offering support. Khajaguda Lake and its adjoining area is developed into a beautiful lakefront.

In 2018, it was reported, that the talab was in better condition than earlier, thanks to restoration efforts of Rs. 80 lakh by Wells Fargo and the NGO United Way of Hyderabad (UWH).

== Statue of emptyness ==
A sculpture named as Statue of emptyness, inspired from Albert György's work and done by Kapil Kapoor was installed at the end of Khajaguda Talab.

== Tourism ==
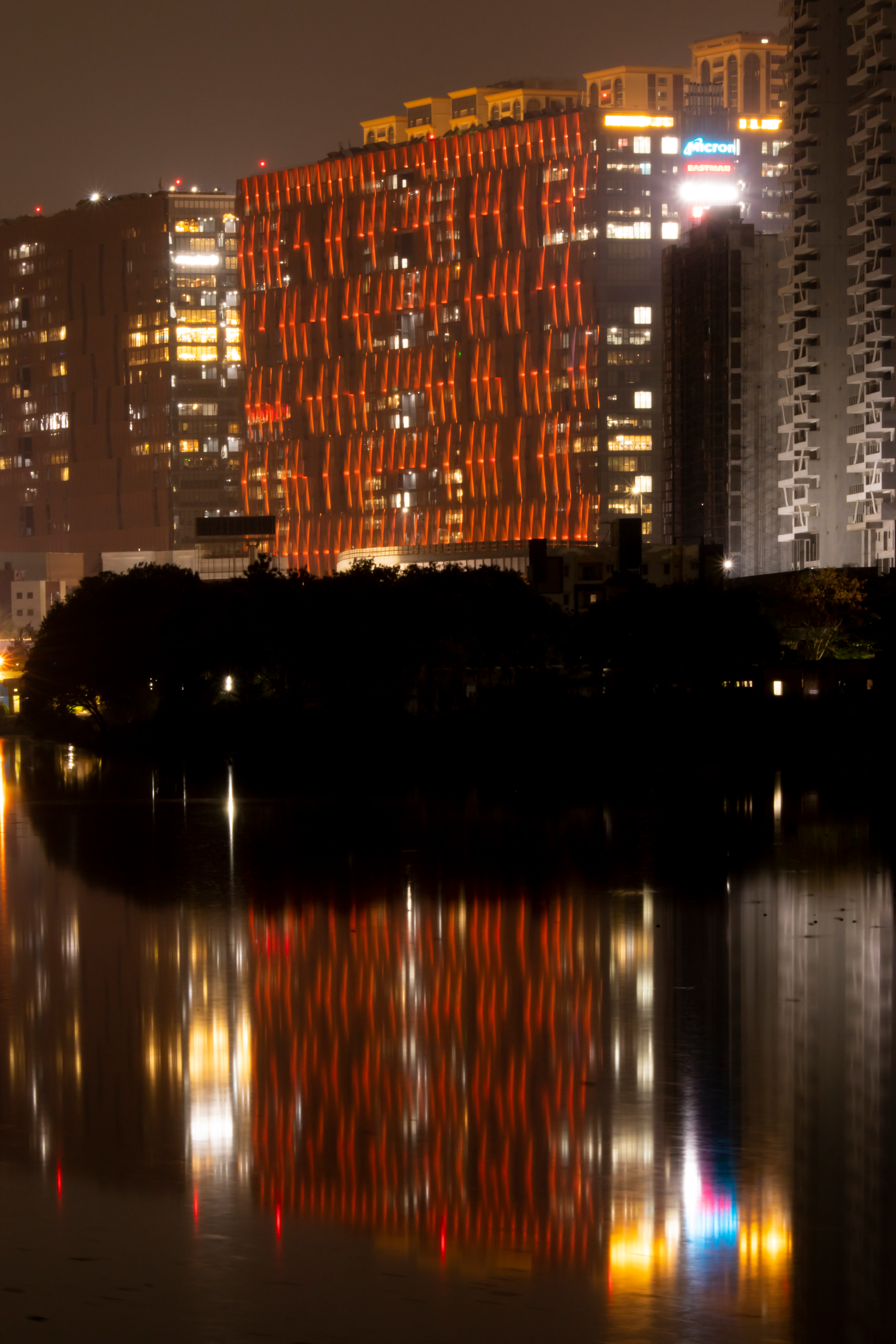
Reflection of The Skyview in Khajaguda Talab

Khajaguda Talab falls in the IT corridor of Hyderabad. It is now brimming with species of birds, snakes, snails, and lizards. Khajaguda Talab has been beautified with shoreside sculptures and floaters in the lake.Some scenes of 2022 Indian Malayalam-language Bro Daddy was shot at Khajaguda Talab lakefront. In March 2023, K. T. Rama Rao launched ‘Lakes Development Programme’ at Pedda Cheruvu lake in Khajaguda, as part of Corporate Social Responsibility (CSR) activity. The programme is aimed at rejuvenating and developing 50 water bodies in and around Hyderabad.

== Sewage Treatment Plant ==
A small sewage treatment plant is located in the easternmost corner of the lake(Khajaguda Talab). It treats 7 MLD (7 million liters per day = 7 000 m^{3}/d).

== Water quality ==
In a 2017 study, NO_{3} levels were found to be extremely high with 33 mg/L (permissible for drinking water 10.16 mg/L). In an earlier study from 2016, the same value was at 10.00 mg/L only

== Maintenance ==
The GHAC (Great Hyderabad Adventure Club) has been carrying out clean sweep days on the lake shore in 2013 and 2014.

== See also ==
- Ramanthapur Lake
- Hyderabad city lakes
