= Lakes in Hyderabad =

Features of the capital of Telangana, India

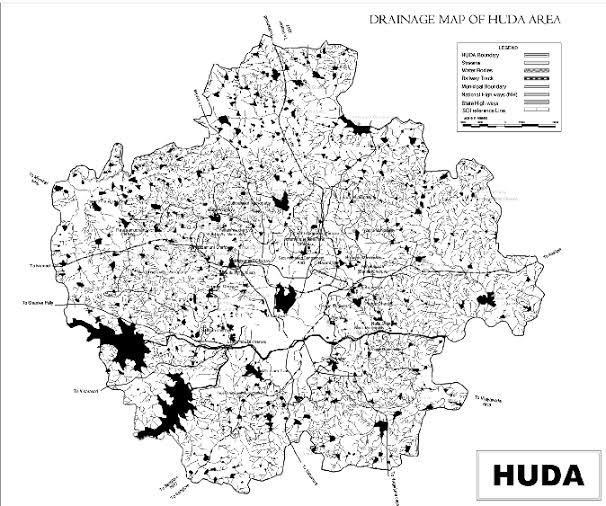
- Water bodies and lakes of Hyderabad
- Location: Hyderabad
- Built: Late 1600's - Early 1700's
- Surface area: ≈40 km^{2} (15 sq mi)
- Water volume: ≈50 million m³ - 100million m³ㅤㅤㅤㅤㅤㅤㅤㅤㅤㅤㅤㅤㅤㅤㅤㅤ (1.77 billion ft³ - ㅤㅤㅤ3.53 billion ft³)

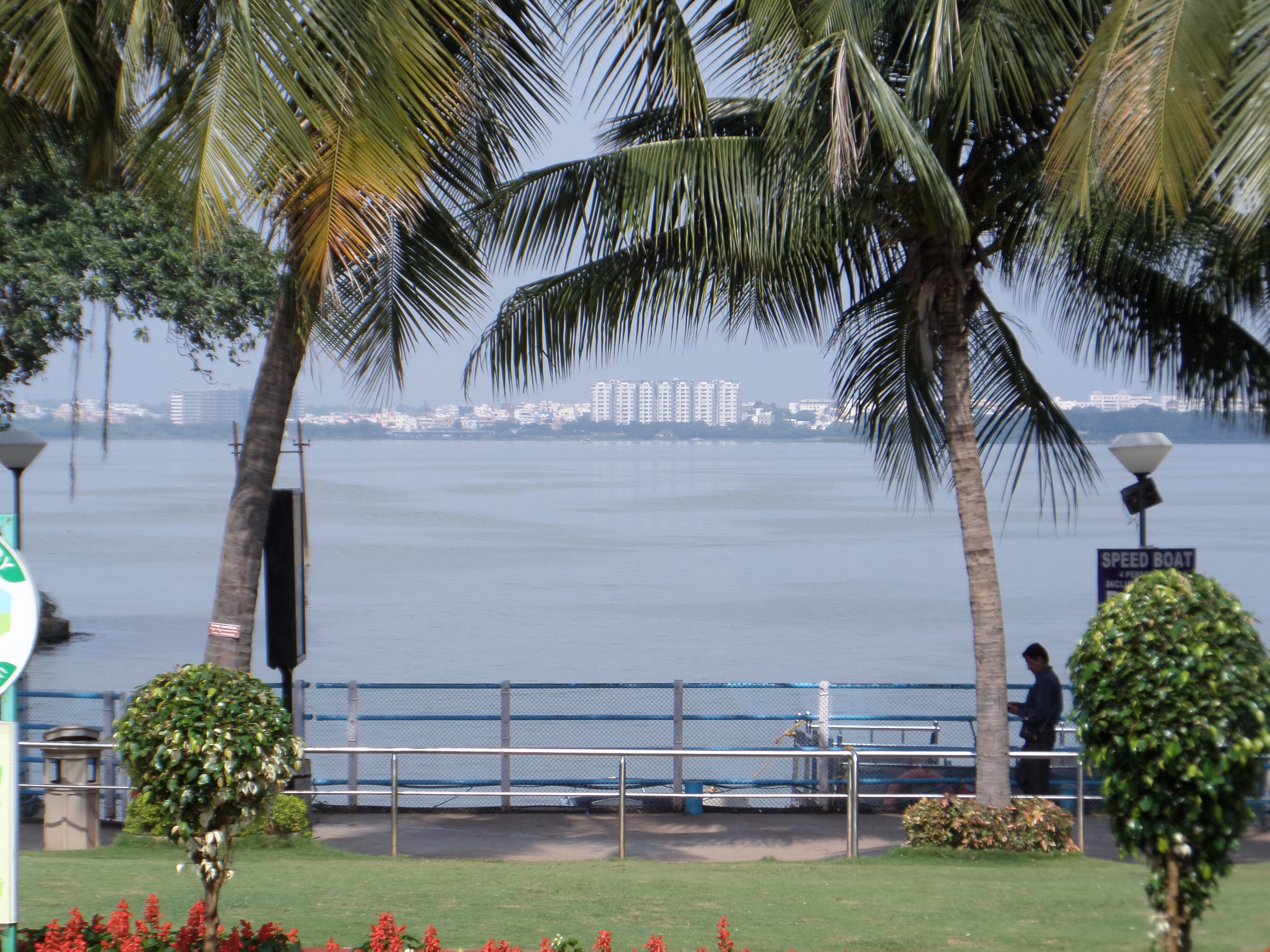
Hussain Sagar is the biggest lake in Hyderabad.

The Indian city of Hyderabad was known as City of Lakes. Some of these lakes are natural and various are man made bodies. As per various sources only a few decades back, Hyderabad had a large number of water bodies such as lakes, reservoirs, rivers, streams, aquaculture ponds, tanks, etc (as per some sources between 3000 and 7000 including natural and manmade bodies. Locally known as cheruvu, kunta, tanks ).

Most of these lakes and tanks were built during the regime of Qutub Shah in 16th and 17th century and later by Nizams as a source of drinking water for the residents of Hyderabad.

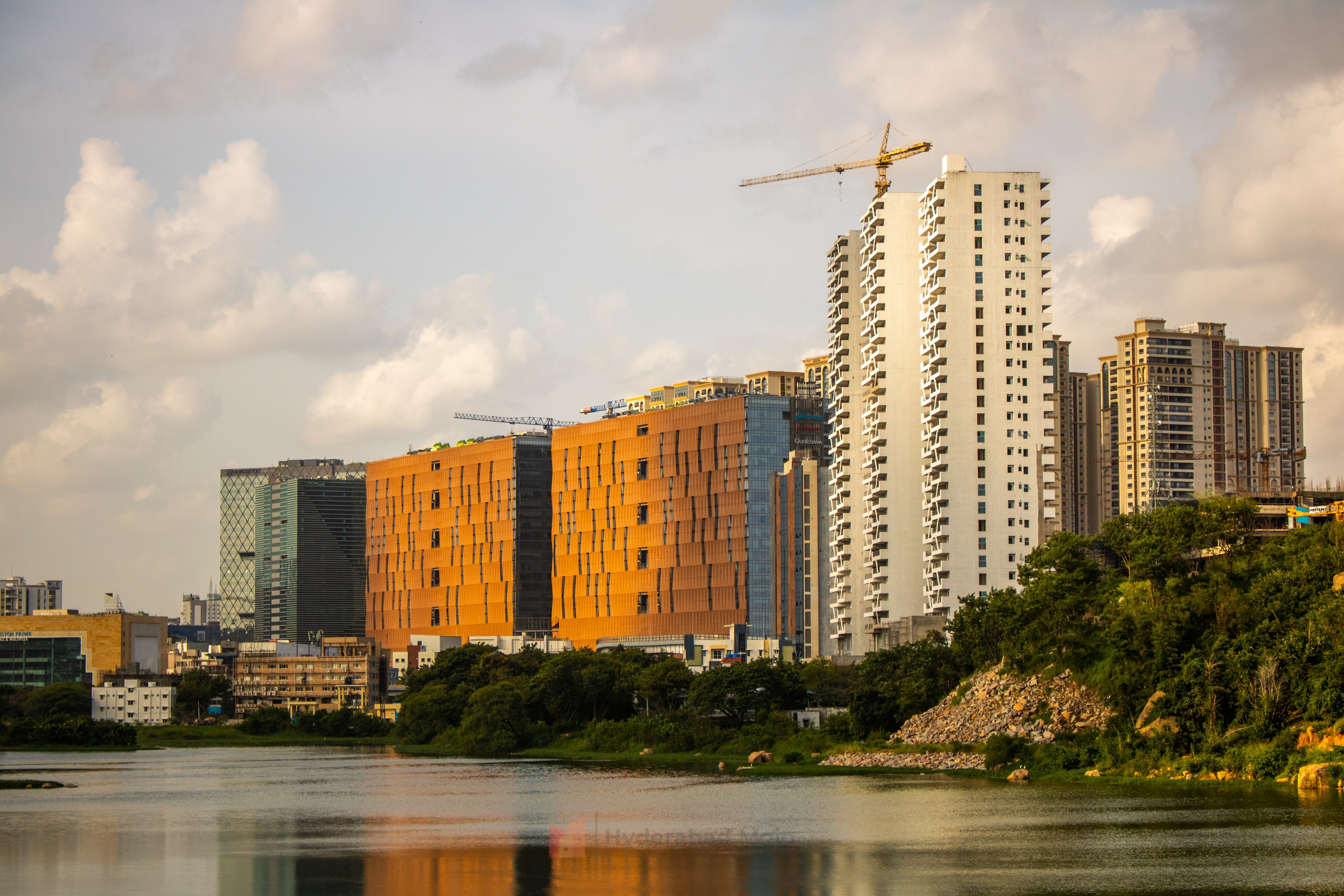
Khajaguda Talab

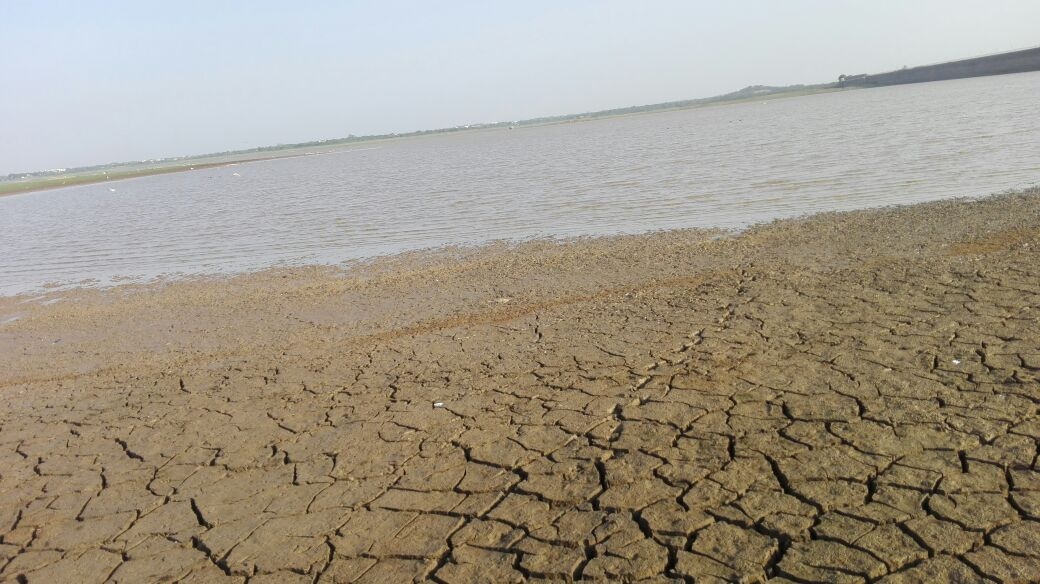
Himayat Sagar which was once a major source of drinking water for Hyderabad

As of 2025, the Hyderabad Metropolitan Development Authority currently keeps record of 2959 lakes in the Hyderabad metropolitan area and 27 lakes in the city of hyderabad.

== Destruction of lakes ==
As per the data from National Remote Sensing Centre, between 1979 and 2023 there has been a reduction of 61% in city’s lake area. Area occupied by 56 lakes were examined and it was found that the total area of these lakes has shrunk from 40.35 km2 (15.58 sq mi) 16 km2 (6.2 sq mi).Most of these lakes have totally disappeared and the surface area of most of the surviving lakes have shrunken and turned to tiny ponds and cesspool.

Some of the lakes which have totally disappeared are Tigal Kunta, Somajiguda Tank, Mir Jumla tank, Pahar Tigal Kunta, Kunta Bhawani Das, Nawab Saheb Kunta, Afzalsagar, Nallakunta, Masab Tank etc.

Hussainsagar Lake, Kunta Mallaiyapalli have also shrunk drastically.

Out of thousands of water bodies those were existing in 1970s in various sizes in and around Hyderabad, today only about 500 of them have survived. Most of them have disappeared due to encroachment or have been illegally drained for real estate projects by private or government agencies. The existing lakes have been used to dump garbage and sewage water. Most of these lakes and tanks were built during the regime of Qutub Shah in 16th and 17th century and later by Nizams as a source of drinking water for the residents of Hyderabad.

The Jubilee Bus Station is located where once the Picket lake used to exist. Madhapur the IT hub of Hyderabad once used to be a network of lakes. The MaSaheba Tank which is now Masab Tank has also almost disappeared and today is occupied by various residential and commercial buildings.

The area of Hussain Sagar, which is the largest lake in Hyderabad shrunk by more than 40% i.e. from 550 ha to 349 ha in just 30 years. This lake was built in 1575 AD and since 1930 is not being used as a source for drinking water.

Similarly, the area occupied by Shamirpet lake shrunk from 486 ha in 1989 to 256 ha in 2006. In total about 3245 ha of water bodies were lost in 12 years (from 1989 to 2001) as per the report by Anjal Prakash.

== Lake Revival Efforts by HMDA ==
The Hyderabad Metropolitan Development Authority (HMDA) has been actively involved in the restoration and rejuvenation of lakes within the Hyderabad Metropolitan Region, focusing on ecological rehabilitation, water quality improvement, groundwater recharge, and environmental sustainability.

Following a High Court directive, HMDA and GHMC identified ten priority lakes for immediate rejuvenation, including Durgam Cheruvu, Malkam Cheruvu, Kapra Lake, and Hussainsagar. More recently, 12 lakes were earmarked for revival, such as Bathukammakunta in Amberpet and Mundikunta near the Hyderabad International Convention Centre.

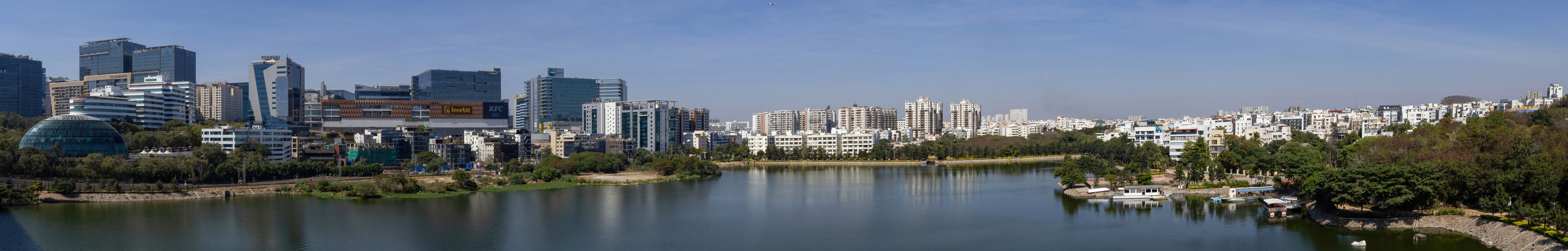
Panoramic view of the city of Hyderabad from the recently renovated Durgam Cheruvu lake

The Hyderabad Disaster Response & Asset Protection Agency (HYDRAA) has taken up six lake restoration projects, including Bathukamma Kunta, which began refilling naturally after decades of neglect. HYDRAA has set a target to complete all six projects by mid-2025 and even developed a 3D transformation model for Nalla Cheruvu in Uppal.

Private firms have also collaborated with HMDA, such as the Kotha Cheruvu project with GEF India and The Durgam Cheruvu project with raheja or the malkam cheruvu project with Aparna Real estate. To coordinate lake conservation efforts, HMDA established the Lake Protection Committee, responsible for monitoring and safeguarding urban water bodies.

== Lakes of Hyderabad ==
A compiled list of lakes, their ID, District, Mandal and related news can be found on the government website of HMDA.

HMDA Government website

These are some of the most famous lakes in hyderabad with a short description of them,

1. Hussain Sagar Area: 5.7 km²

Location: Hyderabad, Telangana

Details: An artificial lake built in 1562, it was once the main source of drinking water for the city.

2. Shamirpet Lake Area: 4.9 km²

Location: Shamirpet, Hyderabad

Details: An artificial lake built during the Nizam era in the 19th century, popular for its scenic beauty and as a picnic spot.

3. Fox Sagar Lake Area: 2 km²

Location: Jeedimetla, Hyderabad

Details: A man-made lake constructed in 1897, it was once a major source of drinking water for Secunderabad.

4. Himayat Sagar Area: 19.68 km²

Location: Ranga Reddy, Telangana

Details: An artificial lake built in 1927 to supply drinking water to Hyderabad and to protect the city from floods.

5. Osman Sagar Area: 46 km²

Location: Hyderabad, Telangana

Details: Constructed in 1920, it serves as a major reservoir supplying drinking water to the city.

6. Durgam Cheruvu Area: 0.34 km² Location: Hyderabad, Telangana

Details: Also known as 'Secret Lake,' it served as a drinking water source during the Qutb Shahi dynasty. It has a total of 140 species of birds and is the most famous lake in hyderabad as of September 2025.

7. Saroornagar Lake Area: 0.4 km² Location: Hyderabad, Telangana

Details: Created in 1626, it was restored in 2003–04 and is now home to various migratory birds.

8. Ameenpur Lake Area: 0.38 km²

Location: Ameenpur, Hyderabad

Details: Recognized as India's first Biodiversity Heritage Site, this lake is home to numerous migratory bird species.

9. Rukn-ud-Daula lake Area: 0.42 km²

Location: Shivrampally, Hyderabad

Details: Constructed in 1770 by Nawab Rukn-ud-Daula, it was built to meet the drinking water supply needs.

10. Mir Alam Tank Area: 1.2 km²

Location: Central Hyderabad

Details: The largest lake in the Old City, it is the site of the Nehru Zoological Park.

== See also ==
- Stepwells in Hyderabad
- Lakes in Bangalore
