= Nallagandla Lake =

Lake in the Nallagandla area in Telangana, India

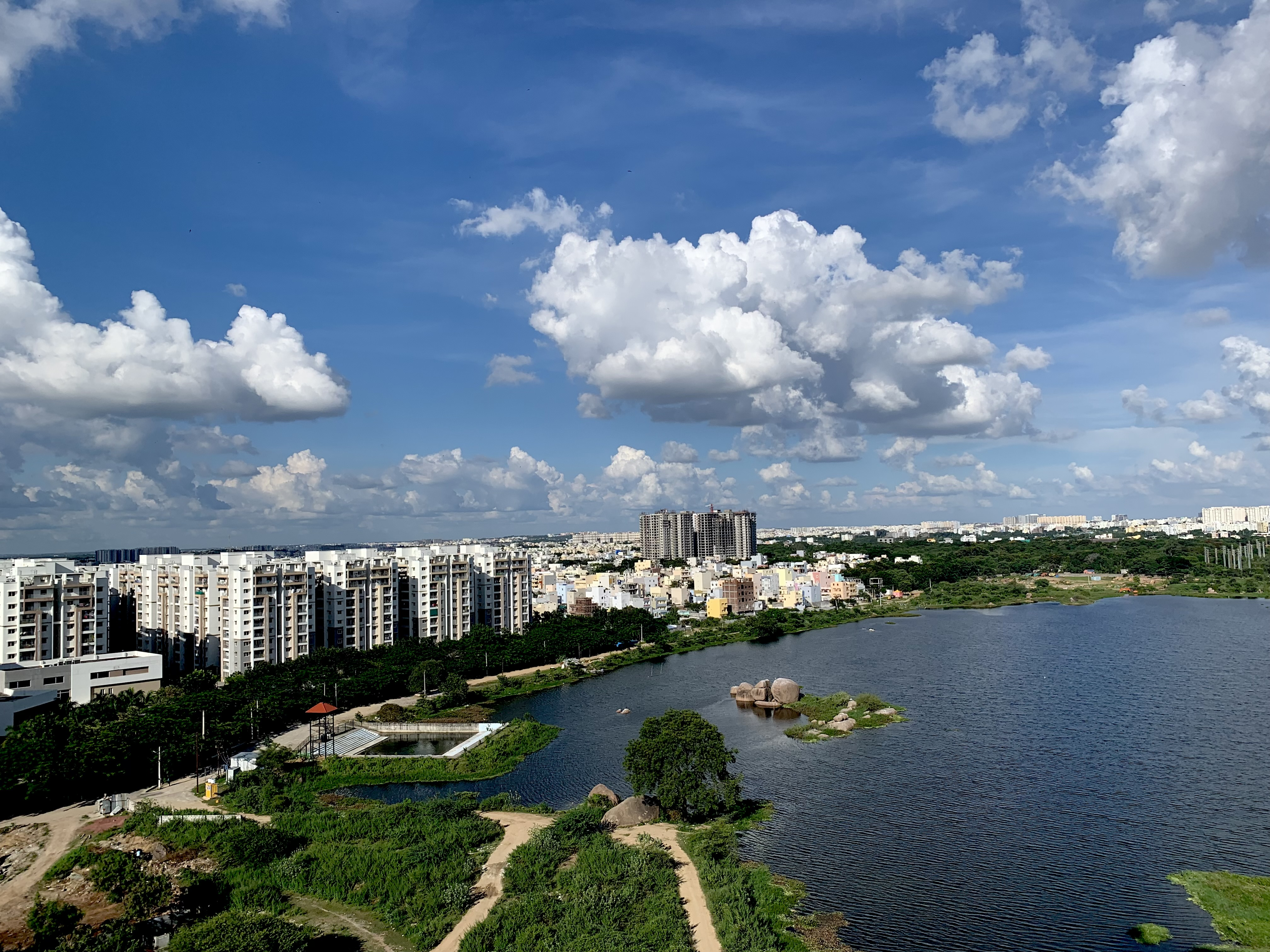
- Nallagandla lake on a sunny day

- Location within Telangana Location within India
- Location: Telangana, India
- Coordinates: 17.4697°N 78.3156°E

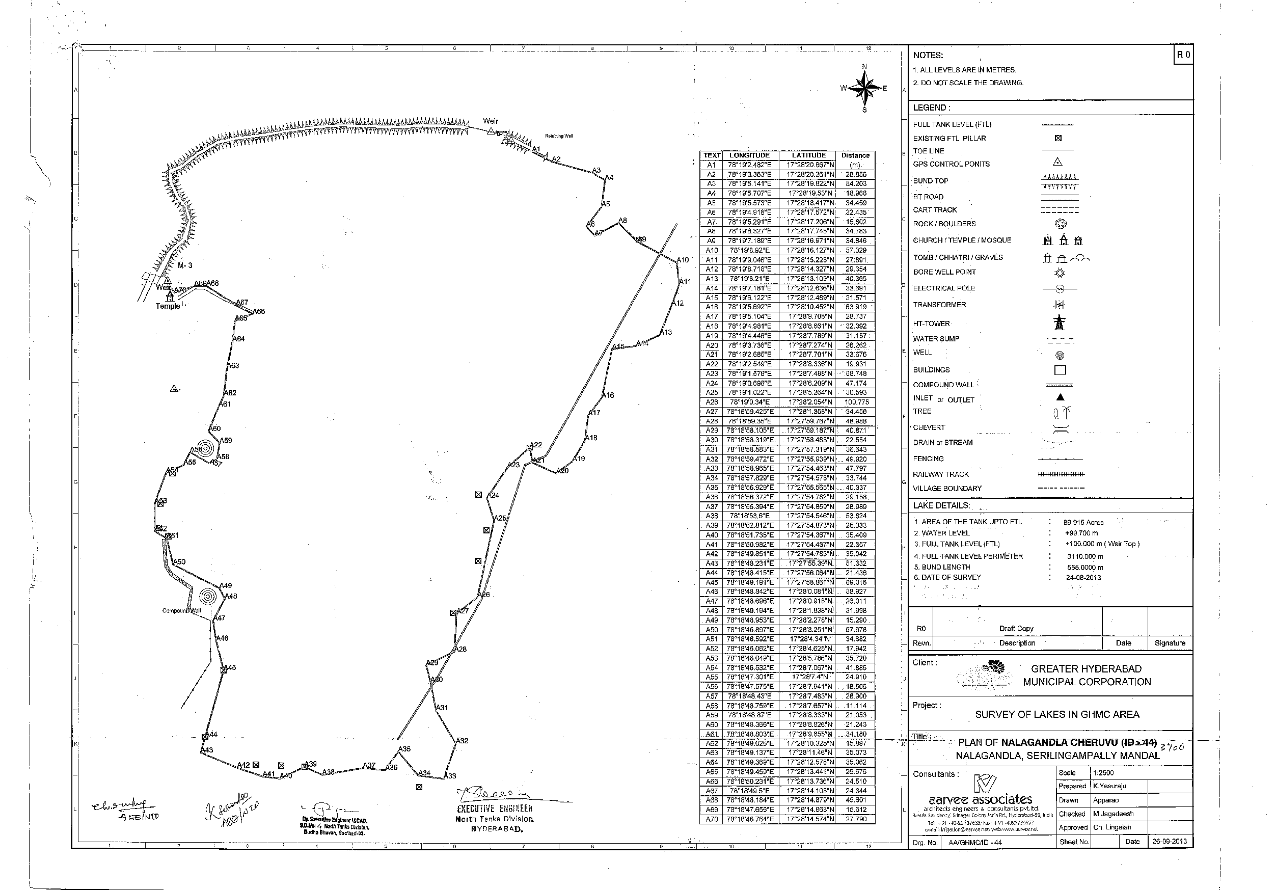
Lake plan as per GHMC survey conducted in 2013

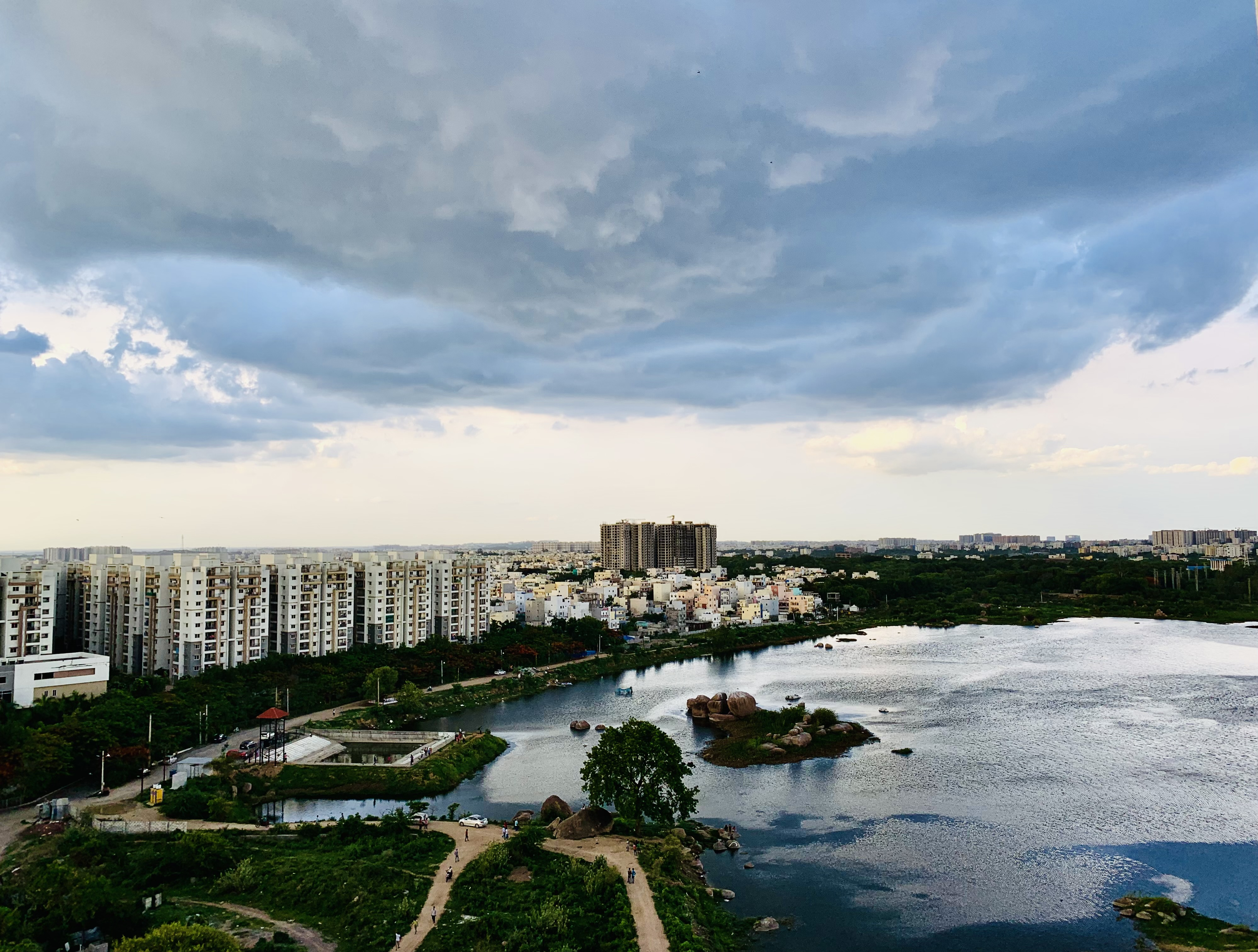
Nallagandla lake on a rainy day

Nallagandla lake is a natural rain-fed lake in the Nallagandla area in the northwestern fringe of Hyderabad in the Indian state of Telangana. The lake bed is around 90 acres, that includes permanent marsh on the south-western edge of the lake. The lake bed shares its boundary with the Hyderabad Central University in the east and is surrounded by residential buildings on the remaining sides. The lake bed acreage is under threat from the construction activities around the lake. The plan of the lake as per the survey of GHMC conducted in 2013 can be found here.

== Nallagandla Temple ==
The Sri Sri Sri Nalla Pochamma temple stands on the western ghat of the lake. This temple is dedicated to Goddess Pochamma, who is believed to be the local village deity. This lake is used by residents of Nallagandla and surrounding areas for festivities during Diwali, Chhath Puja, Bathukamma, and Ganesh Chaturthi. Large congregations of revelers gather at the adjoining pond to partake in the celebrations.

== Lake Facilities ==
A human-made pond adjoins the north-west limit of the lake where immersion of idols is conducted post-festivities. This protects the lake from pollution during festival seasons. The GHMC has set up a watch tower at this pond along with a permanent security post that's constantly staffed. Toilet facilities are also available at the lake, courtesy of the GHMC.

== Birding at Nallagandla Lake ==
Nallagandla lake is listed as a birding hotspot on eBird managed by the Cornell Lab of Ornithology.

=== Resident birds ===
Residents include the great cormorant, little cormorant, great egret, intermediate egret, little egret, white-breasted kingfisher (white-throated kingfisher), grey heron, Eurasian coot (common coot), Indian pond heron, Eurasian moorhen (common moorhen), and grey-headed swamphen (purple moorhen). The substantial marsh and permanent water weed on the south-west edge of the lake provide perfect habitat for the moorhens and swamphens which prefer well-vegetated lakes. A few river terns, a pair of black-winged stilts, and a few red-wattled lapwings have also been spotted in the lake.

A large number of non-aquatic birds also thrive around the lake. Among the birds sighted around the lake are the little green bee-eater (Asian green bee-eater), greater coucal, Indian robin, red-vented bulbul, pied bushchat, sun bird, white-browed wagtail, ashy prinia, spotted dove, dusky crag martin (swallow), house sparrow, and scaly-breasted munia.

=== Migratory birds ===
In June 2021, a large number of spot-billed pelicans and few painted storks visited the lake. They reappeared in varying numbers later in the year in October.

== Aquatic fauna ==
Nallagandla lake has a good population of fish. Local fishermen fish daily at the lake. Among the fish found in the lake are rohu and catla.

== Vegetation ==
Deccan thorn outcrops and stunted prickly trees abound in the south-west part of the lake. The lake is also overrun by water lettuce and horseshoe weed from time to time. Clean ups are conducted at the lake occasionally.

== Ecology ==
Nallagandla lake and its surrounding vegetation support a large number of aquatic and inland birds along with a good population of fish. Fishing and bird-watching are popular activities at the lake. However, the lake is under constant threat from the construction activities around it. In 2018, the Telangana High Court directed the GHMC not to allow any construction activities in the full-tank level area of the lake. A proposal by the government of Telangana to build a new link road along the lake poses an immediate danger to the lake and its fauna. This is being opposed by the residents of Nallagandla.

== Gallery ==
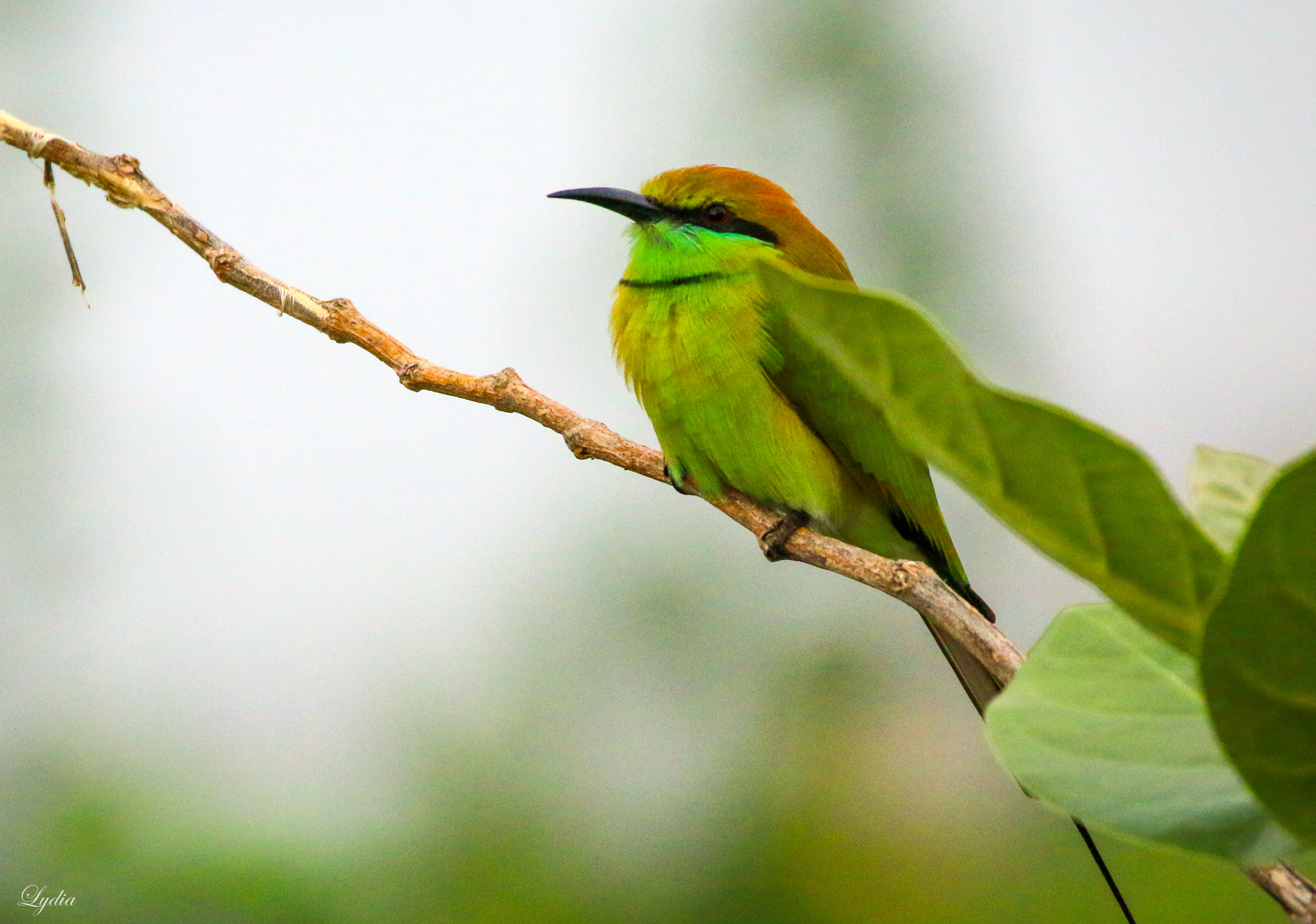

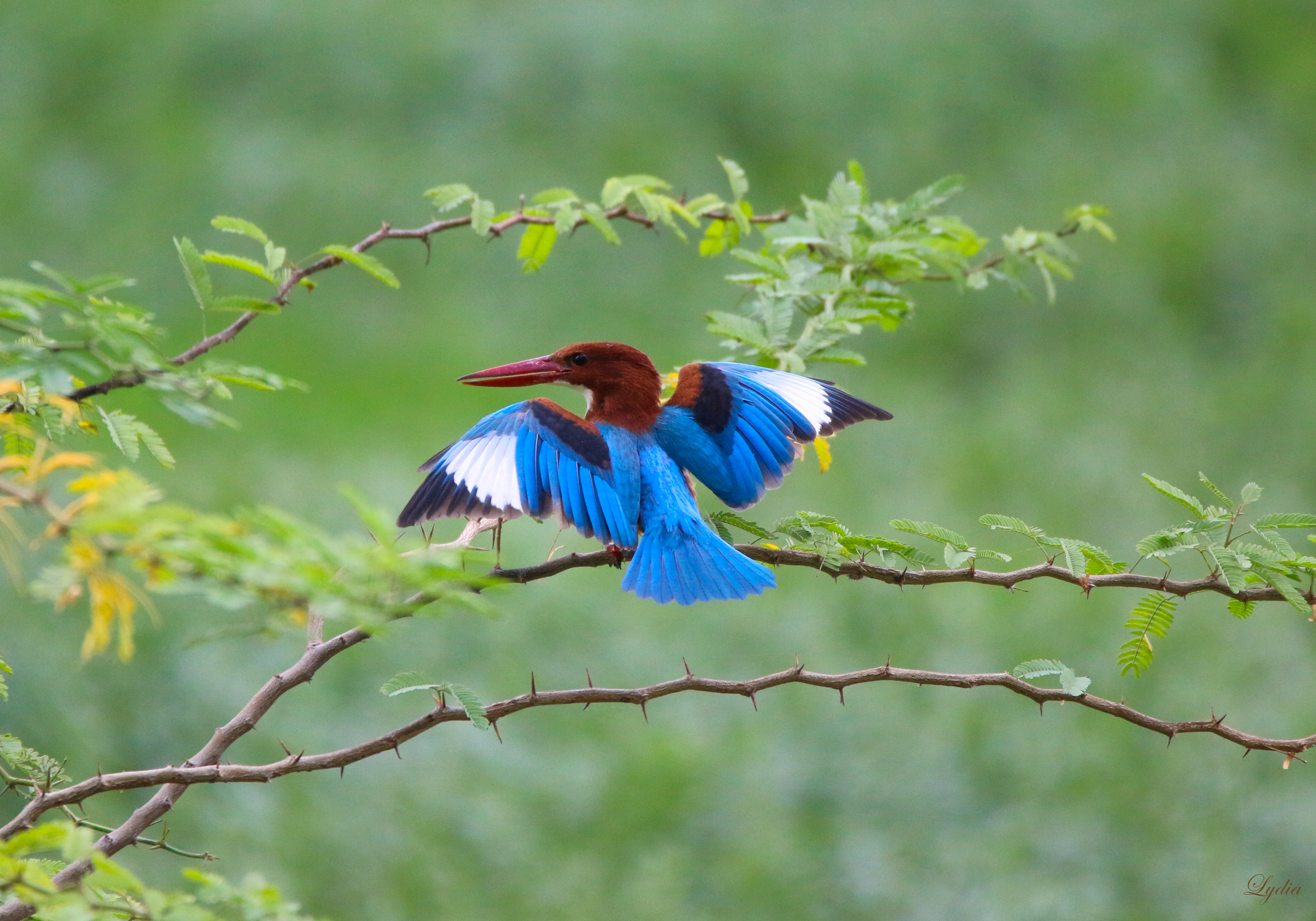

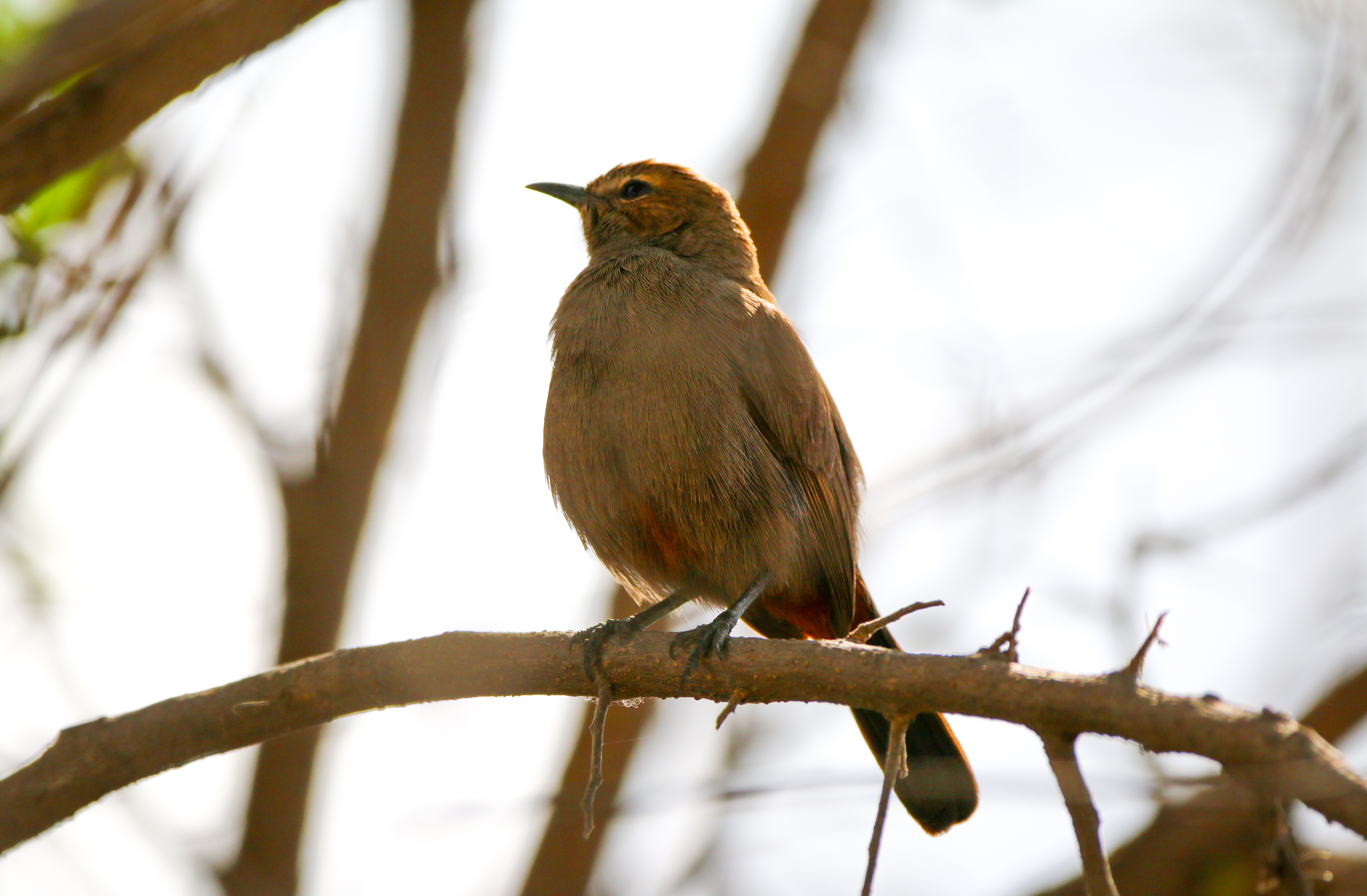

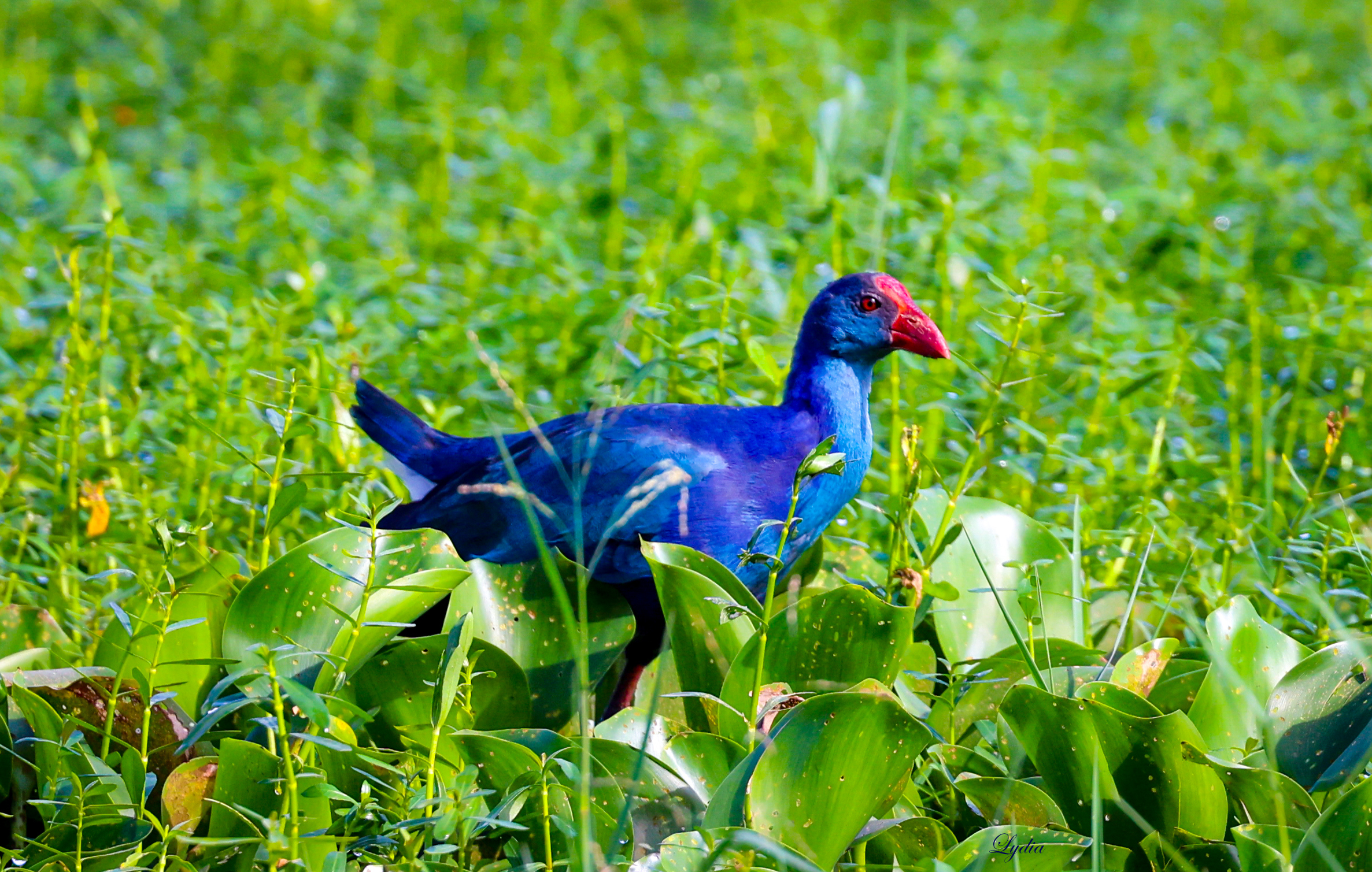
Purple Moorhen at Nallagandla Lake

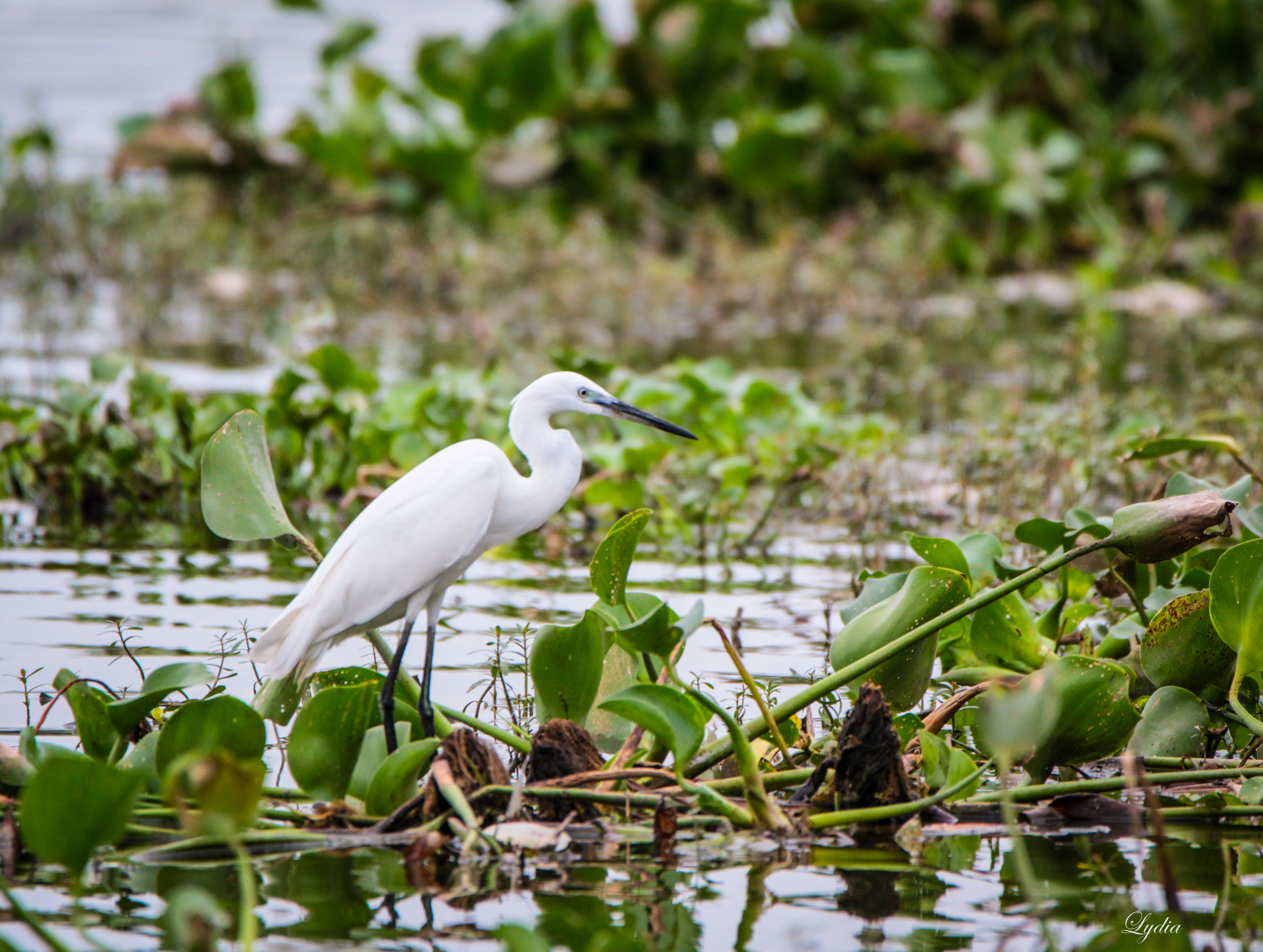

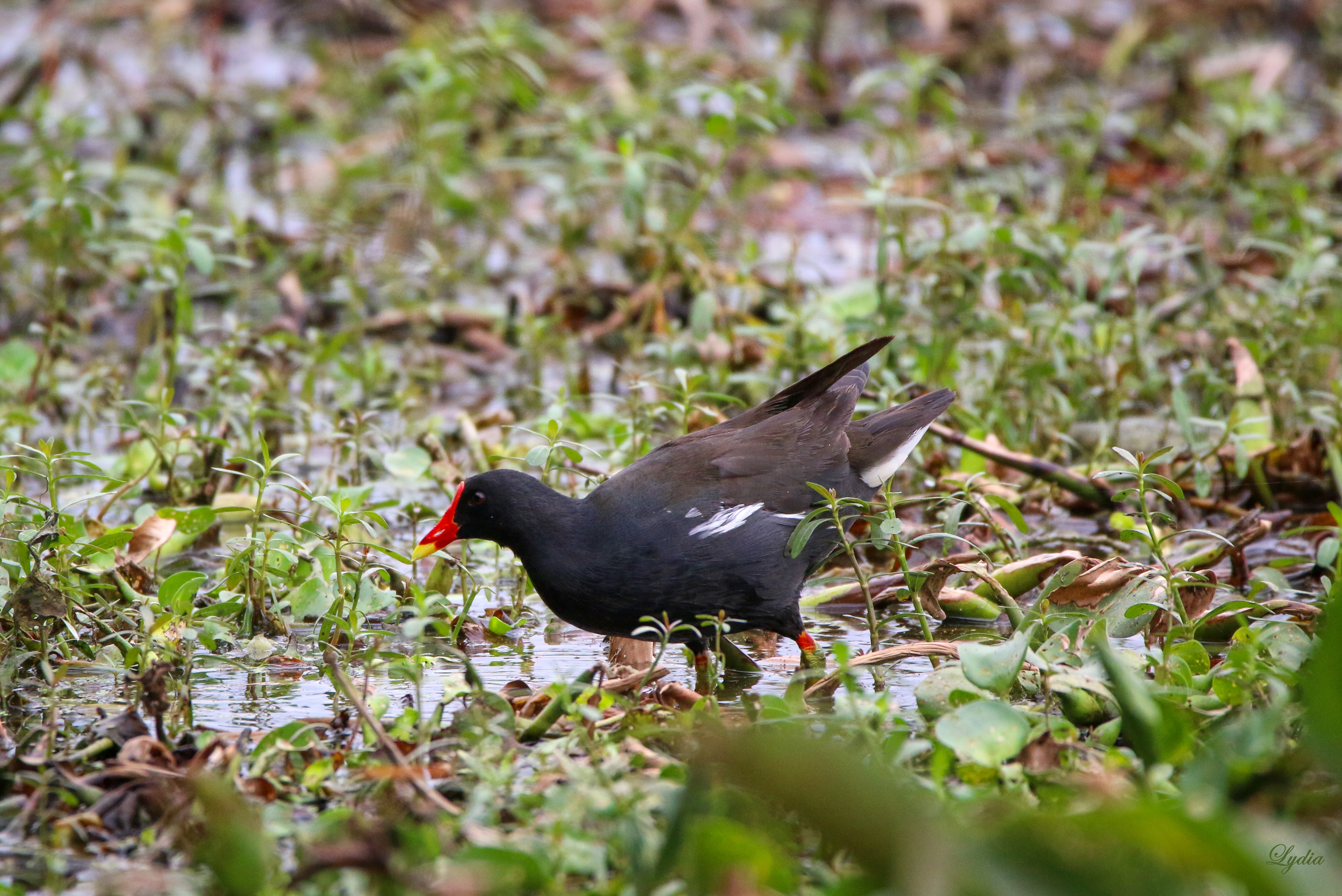

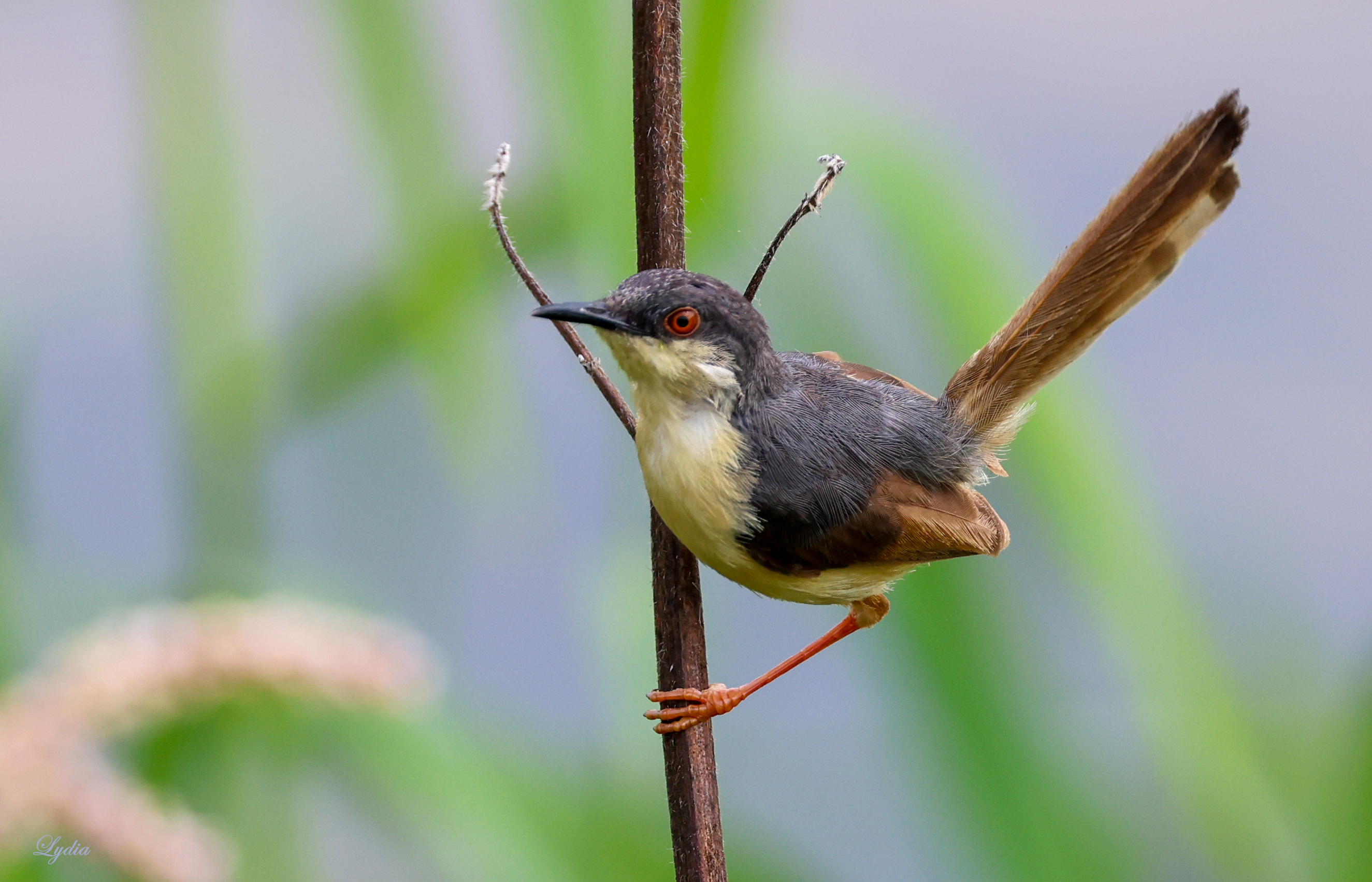

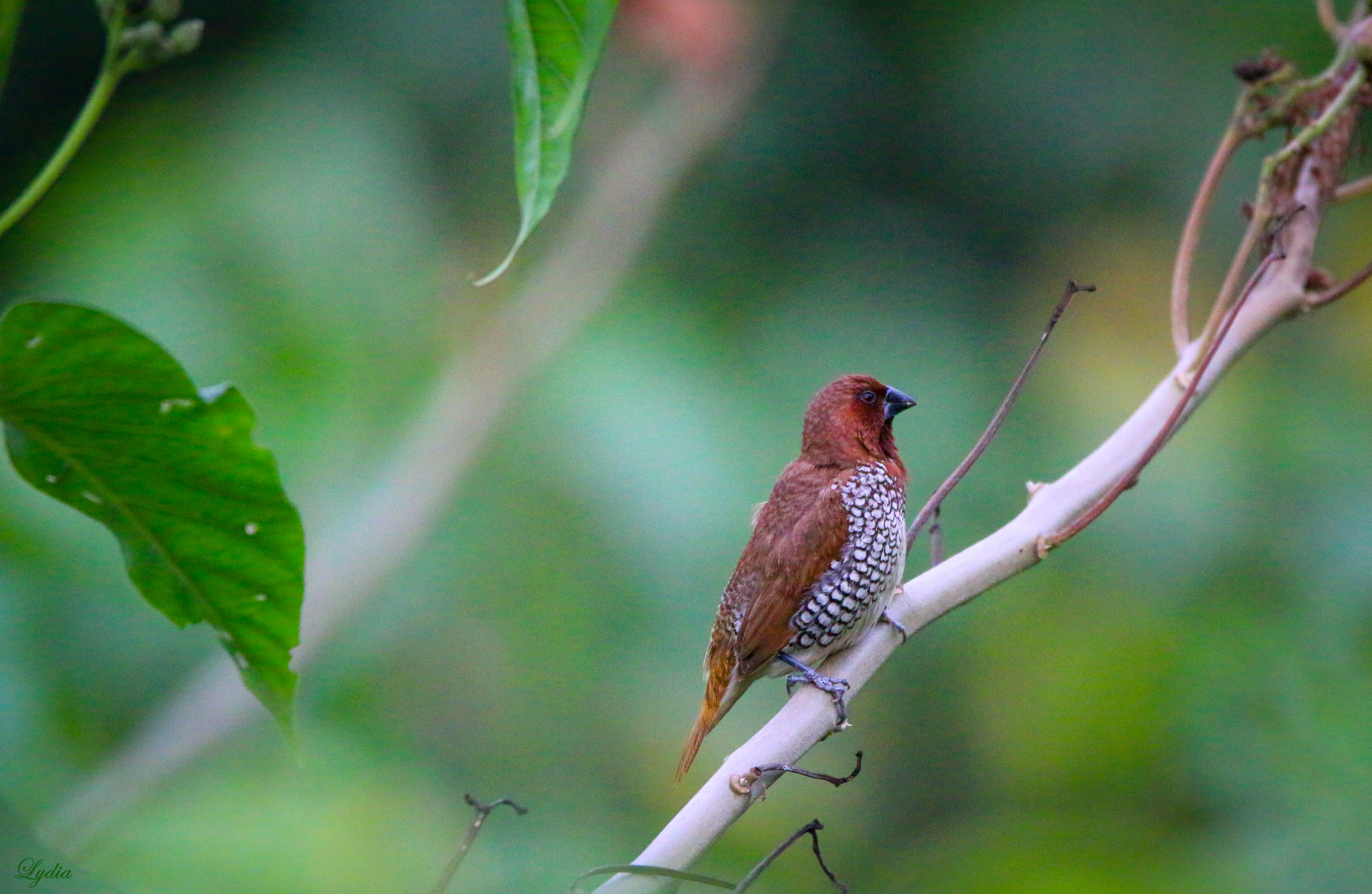

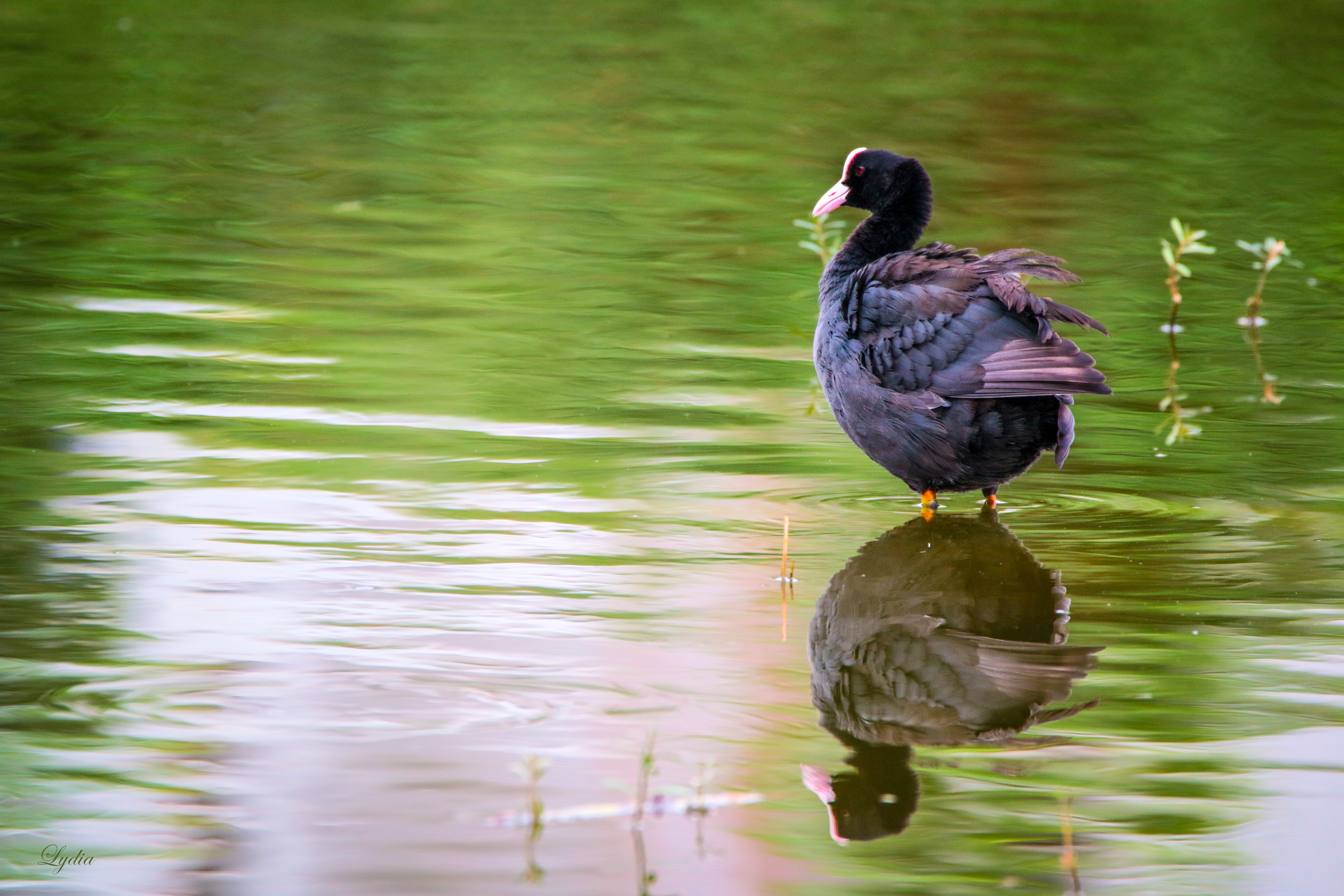

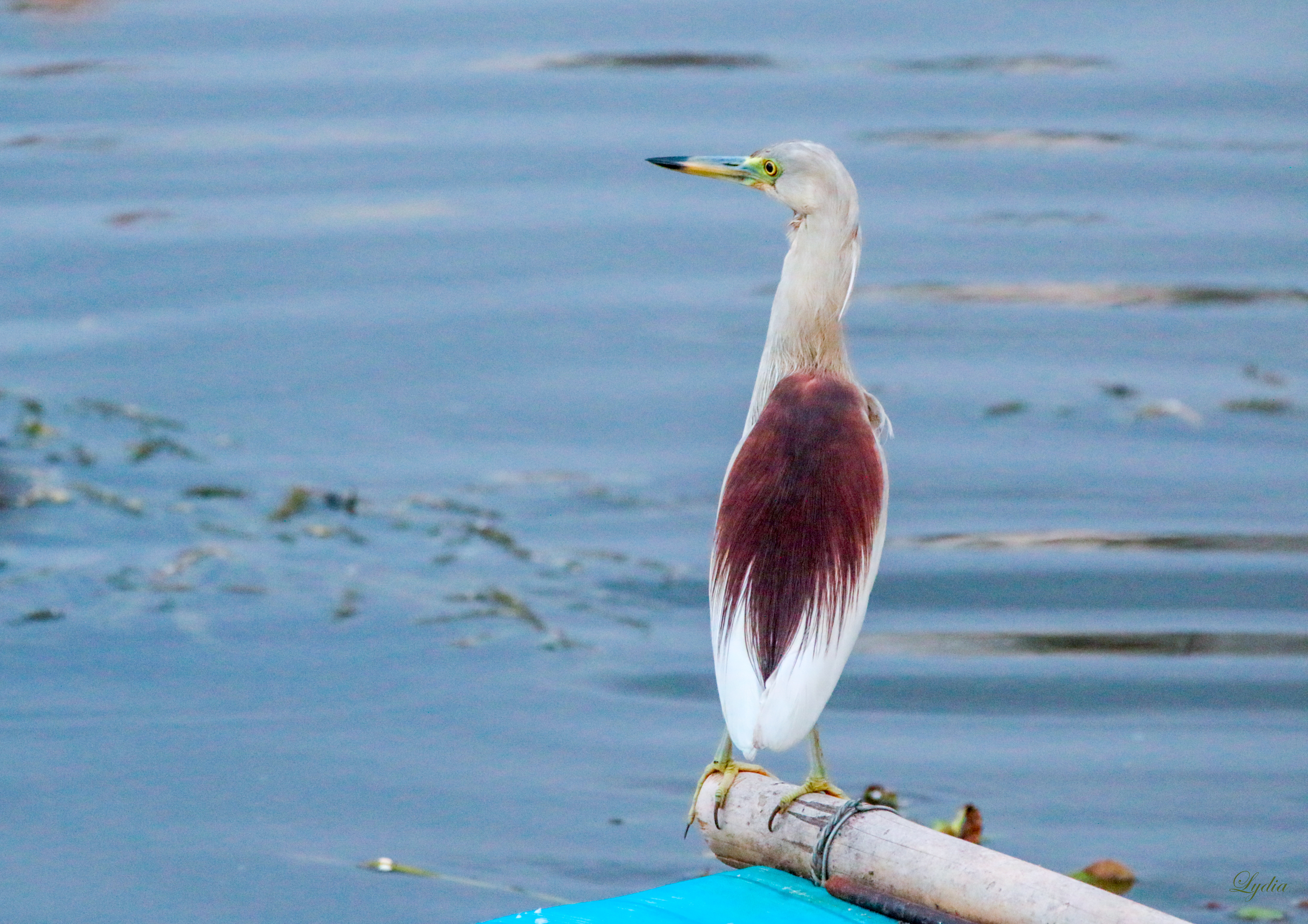

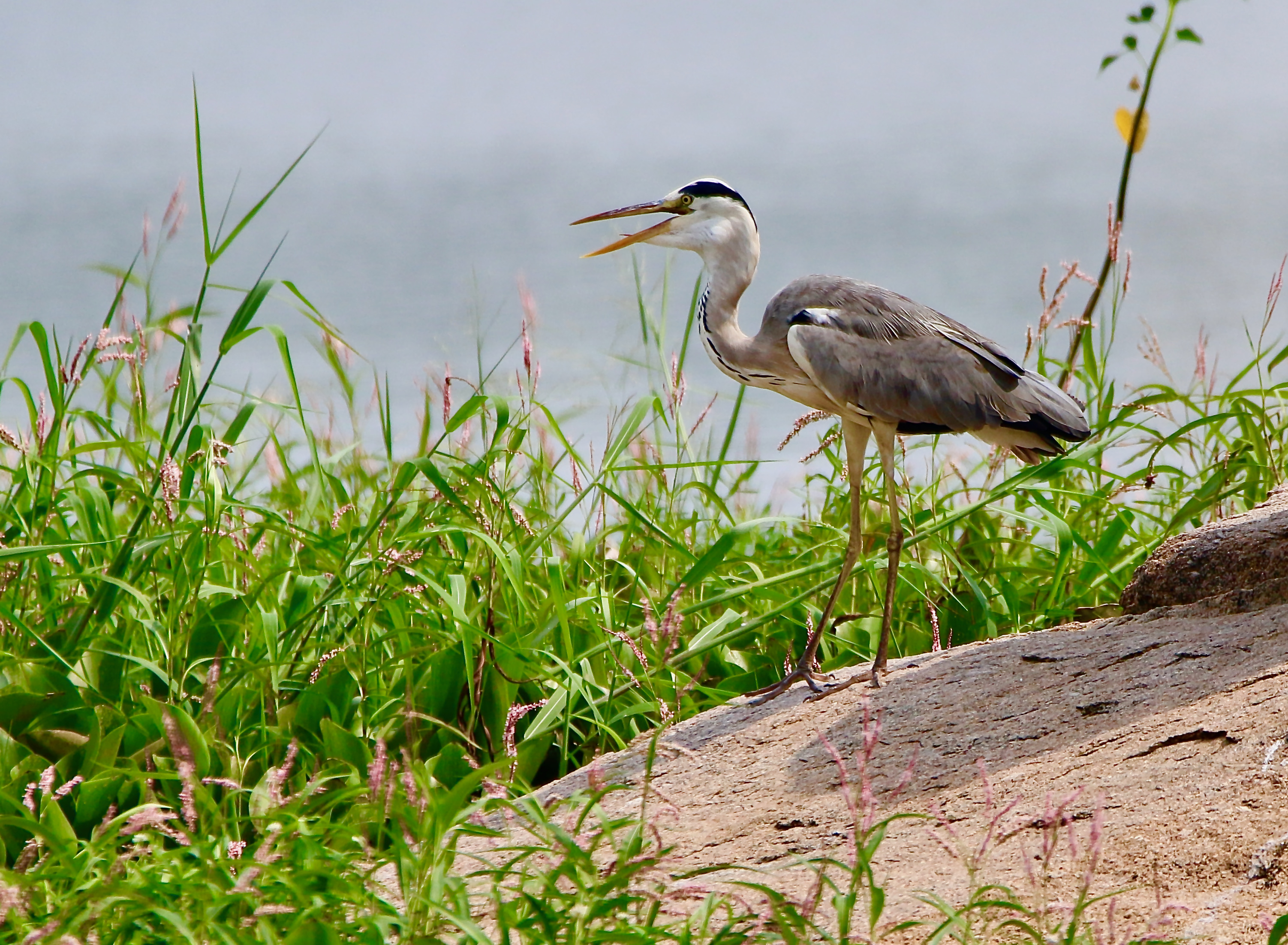

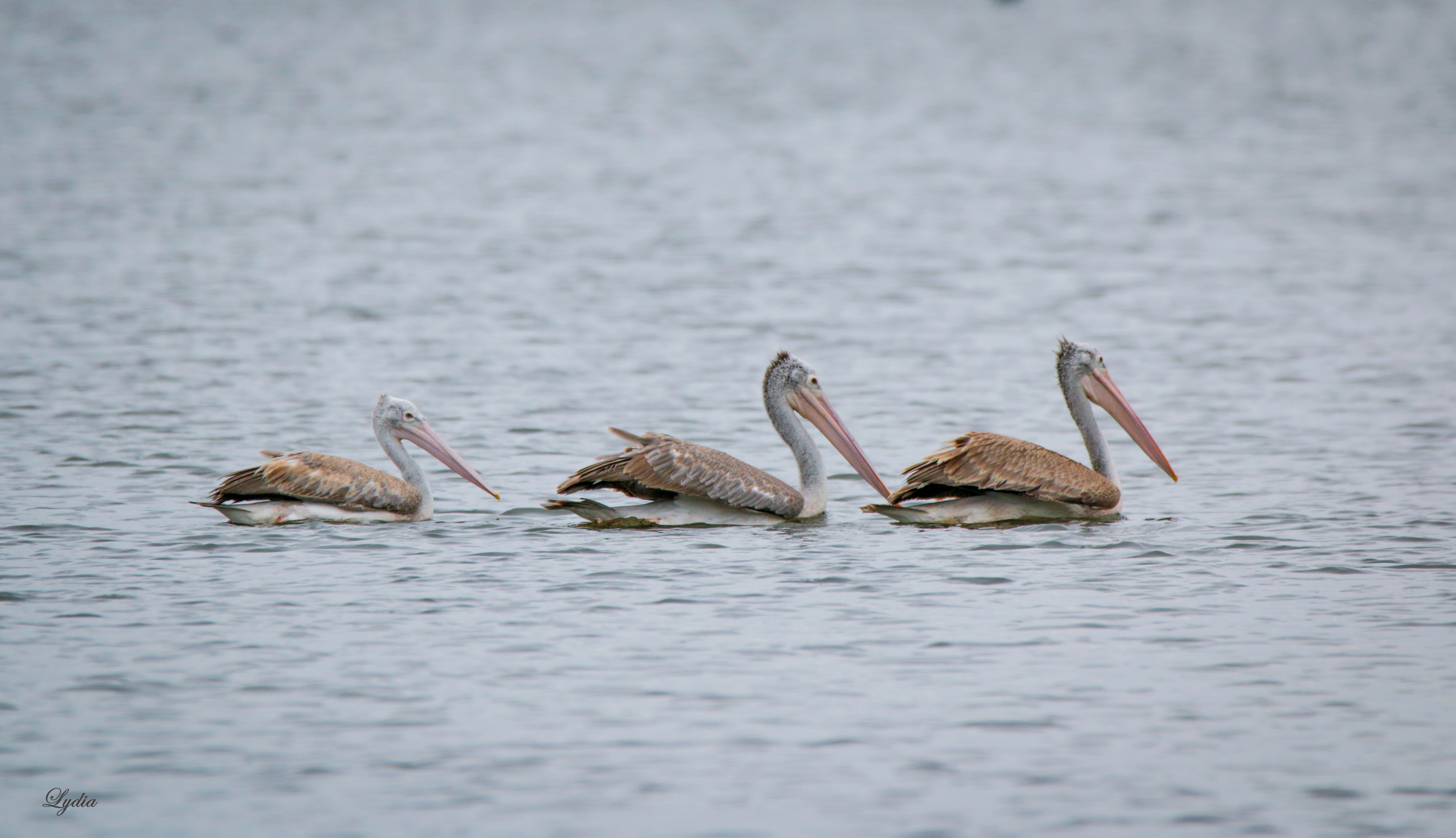

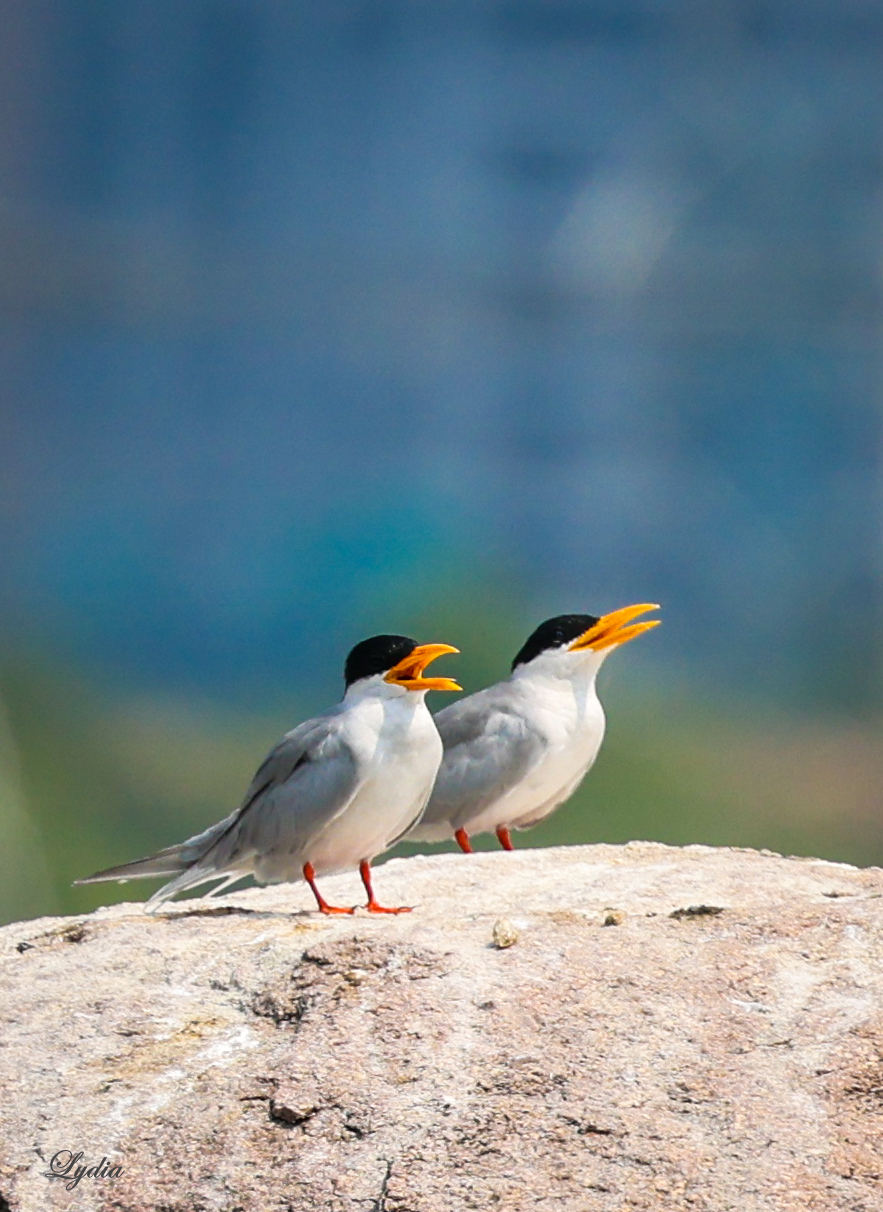

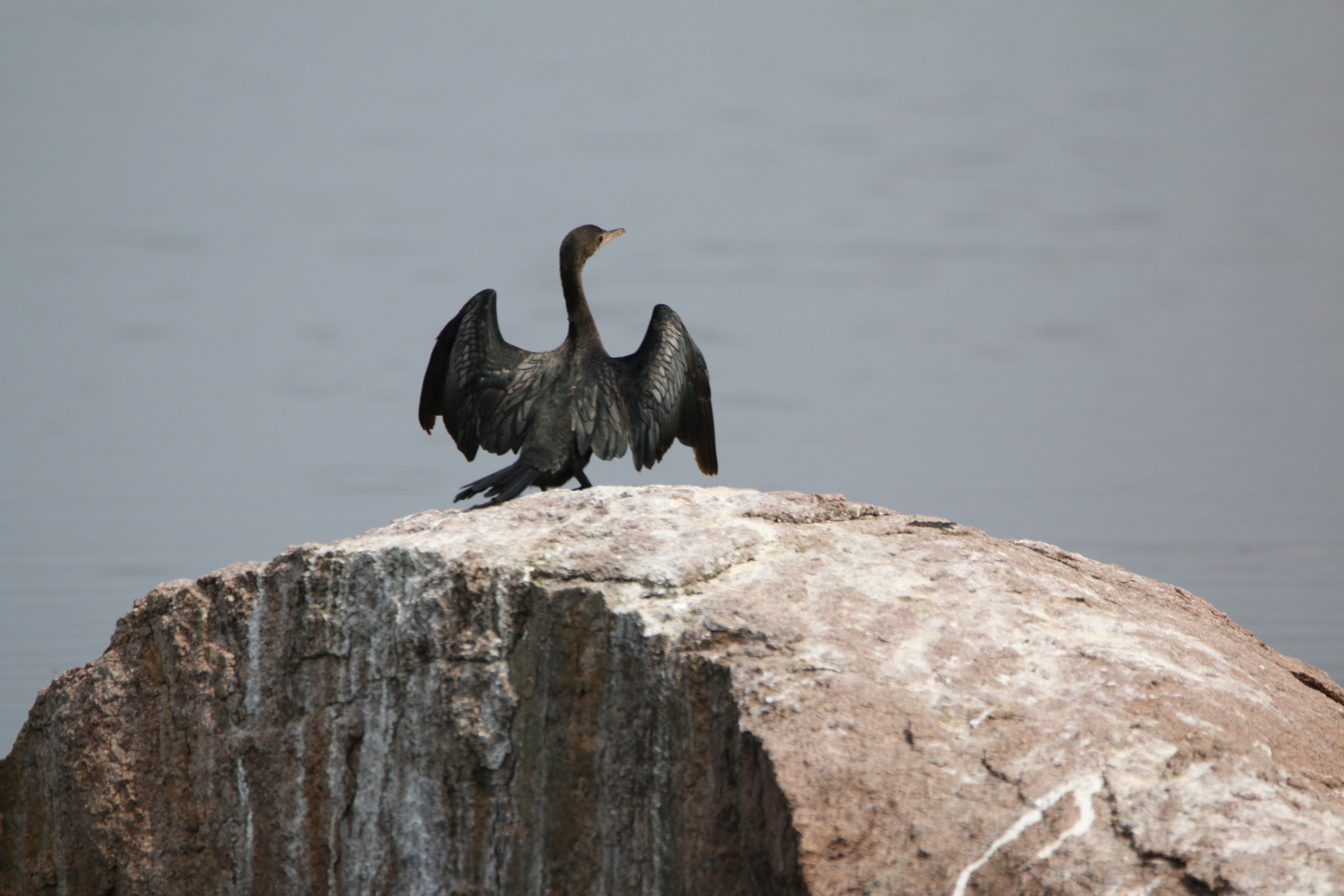

== See also ==
- Hyderabad city lakes
