= Rukn-ud-Daula Lake =

Rukn-ud-Daula lake
- Location within Hyderabad Location within Telangana Location within India
- Location: Shivrampally, Hyderabad
- Coordinates: 17°19′54″N 78°26′31″E
- Type: artificial lake
- Built: 1770; 256 years ago
- Surface area: 104 acres (42 ha) present = 17.491 acres (7.078 ha)

Rukn-ud-Daula lake or Bum-Rukn-ud-Dowla is a historic lake situated in Shivarampally village in Hyderabad, India.

== History ==
The lake was constructed in 1770 by Nawab Rukn-ud-Daula, the Prime Minister of Sikandar Jah - the 3rd Nizam of Hyderabad. The lake was built to meet the drinking water supply. It is claimed that water was so clean that this lake was the source of drinking water for the royal families. The lake originally covered an area of 104 acres (0.42 km^{2}).

=== Current status ===
Presently only a portion of the original lake remains as the lake has been used as garbage dumping area for decades. It is reported that almost 80% of the lake is encroached and residential and commercial buildings have been built over the lake area. The lake is severely polluted with sewage from adjacent buildings. Recommendations of National Green Tribunal and Irrigation Department could not be implemented. HYDRAA has taken up clearing of the encroachments along the lake. Some encroachments are being cleared and some of the illegal buildings have been razed.
