= Core Urban Region (Integrated Governance) Act, 2026 =

2026 Telangana bill concerning integrated governance of Hyderabad's core urban region

Telangana Legislative Assembly
- Territorial extent: Telangana
- Assented to: 22 September 2026

Legislative history
- Bill title: Core Urban Region (Integrated Governance) Bill, 2026
- Introduced by: D. Sridhar Babu
- Introduced: 12 September 2026

Related legislation
- L. A. BILL. NO.27 OF 2026
- Status: In force

The Core Urban Region (Integrated Governance) Act, 2026, commonly known as the CURE Act, is legislation of the Government of Telangana concerning the governance of the Hyderabad metropolitan region. The Act seeks to establish an integrated governance framework for the Core Urban Region (CURE), comprising the Greater Hyderabad Municipal Corporation, Cyberabad Municipal Corporation and Malkajgiri Municipal Corporation, and to replace the Greater Hyderabad Municipal Corporation Act, 1955.

The bill was passed by the Telangana Legislative Assembly on 12 September 2026. During its passage, the proposed maximum annual increase in property tax during the transition to a capital-value-based system was reduced from 20 percent to 10 percent. The Gazette notification of CURE act was issued on 2 October 2026.

The framework provides for coordination among the three municipal corporations and specialised agencies in areas including urban planning, infrastructure, environmental protection, disaster management and civic services.

== Background ==
The Core Urban Region was identified by the Telangana government as the metropolitan area extending to the Outer Ring Road (ORR), and covers about 2,053 km^{2} (793 sq mi). In legislation introduced in January 2026, the government described the CURE as a major centre of metropolitan growth and stated that the increasing population and metropolitan expansion had created demand for region-wide planning of water supply, sewerage, drainage, roads, solid waste management and other public services.

The government stated that the coexistence of multiple municipalities and municipal corporations governed under different legislation had resulted in administrative fragmentation and difficulties in developing region-wide infrastructure.

In February 2026, the Telangana government reorganised the Core Urban Region and constituted three municipal corporations: Greater Hyderabad Municipal Corporation, Cyberabad Municipal Corporation and Malkajgiri Municipal Corporation.

== Draft and public consultation ==
The Telangana government released the draft Core Urban Region (Integrated Governance) Bill in July 2026 for public consultation. The draft was intended to replace the Greater Hyderabad Municipal Corporation Act, 1955 and establish a common framework for governance across the Core Urban Region.

The draft proposed changes to municipal administration, property taxation, digital governance, building permissions, environmental management and coordination among civic agencies.

The draft was placed in the public domain from 4 July to 26 July 2026. According to IT and Industries Minister D. Sridhar Babu, the government received 4,107 online responses and 400 email submissions and made 70 changes to the draft before introducing the bill in the Assembly.

== Provisions ==
=== Governance ===
The bill establishes an integrated framework for governance of the Core Urban Region, covering the Greater Hyderabad, Cyberabad and Malkajgiri municipal corporations. It provides for an CURE apex governance council headed by the Chief Minister of Telangana and mechanisms for coordination among municipal corporations and government agencies. It introduces Unique Property Identification Numbers (UPIN), single trade licenses, and integrated utility bills.

The proposed framework is intended to coordinate infrastructure and civic services that operate across municipal boundaries.

=== Structure ===
According to the government during introduction of the bill, the legislation contains five parts, 43 chapters, 319 sections and nine schedules.

=== Property taxation ===
The bill provides for a transition from the Annual Rental value (ARV) system of property taxation to a Capital Value System (CVS). Earlier, Brihanmumbai Municipal Corporation (BMC) had also introduced the Capital Value System (CVS) in April 2010 to calculate property taxes in Mumbai based on market value rather than the traditional rental-based Rateable Value System. BMC implemented a capital-value-based property-tax system, using property values derived from government Ready Reckoner rates.

Other cities have adopted different approaches when moving away from ARV. Kolkata introduced a Unit Area Assessment system in 2017, while Bengaluru adopted a Unit Area Value system after earlier proposals to implement capital-value-based taxation.

The draft had proposed a 20 percent annual transition limit. During passage in the Legislative Assembly, the government amended the provision to limit the annual increase in property tax to 10 percent of the tax payable in the preceding year until the benchmark tax under the new system is reached. Existing property tax becomes 'base property tax' and Commissioner calculates ‘benchmark property tax’ under the new system. Once the CVS is implemented, residential buildings will be taxed at 0.15% of their capital value, while non-residential buildings will be taxed at 0.75%.

The final legislative debate also included concerns from opposition legislators regarding the possible effect of the change in valuation methodology on property owners.

The Capital Value System for property tax, which is expected to significantly increase tax liability, came into force from October 2, 2026 for newly constructed properties that have not yet been assessed. For existing properties, the new system will be implemented from the next financial year, 2027-28, beginning April 1, 2027.

=== Digital governance ===
The bill provides for digital delivery of municipal services, including online applications, digital approvals, electronic records, electronic signatures and online payments. It also provides for a unified digital citizen-service platform.

The July draft additionally proposed a common billing and payment system and an integrated portal for permissions, licences and civic services. There are two mobile apps launched by Government of Telangana: The CURE-1 app - a unified payment platform for Common Unified Billing and Collection System for the Core Urban Region (GHMC, CMC, and MMC), and the My Cure app - focuses on civic grievance redressal and municipal services.

=== Building regulation ===
The draft legislation proposed time-bound processing of building-permission applications and mechanisms for deemed approval in specified circumstances where applications were not processed within prescribed periods.

The draft also contained provisions concerning action against unauthorised construction and the relationship between building approvals and civic utility connections.

=== Environment and public assets ===
The bill gives statutory recognition to the role of the Hyderabad Disaster Response and Asset Protection Agency (HYDRAA) in protecting public assets, including lakes, nalas and other government properties.

It also contains provisions concerning flood prevention, water security, greenery, waste management and pollution control.

The bill includes provisions concerning wastewater reuse, sustainable transport, electric-vehicle charging infrastructure, bicycle lanes and pedestrian facilities.

=== Other civic functions ===
The proposed framework covers coordination in areas including traffic management, disaster management, climate action and urban infrastructure.

== Reception ==
=== Government ===
The Telangana government presented the bill as a comprehensive reform intended to modernise the governance of Hyderabad's rapidly expanding metropolitan region. The government argued that the existing 1955 legislation was designed for a substantially smaller urban population and did not adequately address metropolitan-scale infrastructure and service delivery.

=== Opposition ===
AIMIM floor leader Akbaruddin Owaisi and BJP MLA Palvai Harish Babu raised objections during the Assembly debate. Owaisi called for the bill to be referred to a Select Committee and questioned the absence of an all-party or stakeholders' meeting before its introduction. Harish Babu raised concerns about the powers of elected representatives.

The Assembly debate also included concerns regarding the proposed change in property-tax assessment and its possible effect on residents.

=== Civil society ===
The draft bill was assessed by urban-governance organisations including Janaagraha. Its assessment raised concerns regarding accountability, citizen participation, institutional arrangements, staffing and funding.

Resident and stakeholder groups also raised concerns about property taxation, user charges and aspects of the proposed governance structure during the public consultation process.

== Legislative history ==
Date	Event
2 January 2026	The Greater Hyderabad Municipal Corporation (Second Amendment) Bill, 2026 was introduced in the Telangana Legislative Assembly. Its statement of objects described the Core Urban Region as extending to the Outer Ring Road and cited the need for integrated metropolitan governance.
11 February 2026	The Telangana government issued an order concerning the reorganisation of CURE and constitution of the Cyberabad, Malkajgiri and Greater Hyderabad municipal corporations.
4 July 2026	The draft Core Urban Region (Integrated Governance) Bill was placed in the public domain for consultation.
July 2026	Public consultation was conducted and the government received thousands of online and email submissions.
September 2026	The revised bill was introduced in the Telangana Legislative Assembly.
12 September 2026	The Telangana Legislative Assembly passed the CURE Bill. The property-tax transition cap was amended from 20 percent to 10 percent.

== See also ==
- Hyderabad Metropolitan Development Authority
- Hyderabad Disaster Response and Asset Protection Agency
- Greater Bengaluru Governance Act, 2024
