= NDCRTC =

Indian agency

- Type: Centre of Excellence
- Legal status: Active
- Location: Hyderabad
- Region served: India
- Website: ndcrtc.svpnpa.gov.in

National Digital Crime Resource & Training Centre (NDCRTC) is a centre functioning under the IT wing of SVP National Police Academy (SVPNPA) with the objective of Capacity Building of Law Enforcement Agencies in Cyber Crime Investigation. This centre is giving training to officers from State Police, CPOs and other LEAs of Central Government, Digital Forensic Experts of CFSL and State FSL, Judges and Prosecutors. The main objective of this centre is to build capacity in the field of Cyber Crime Investigation and creating Master Trainers in this field among all wings of Criminal Justice System of the Country in association with all agencies of State as well as Central Government working in this field.

This centre is being governed by a Governing Body headed by Director, NPA. The Governing body will be assisted by Technical Advisory Body composed of domain experts from Police, other LEAs, Forensic Science Departments and Industry. The main focus of this centre at present is on Digital Forensics. However, in future, it will also focus on IT Act, Digital Evidence, Malware Analysis and Cyber Security.

== Achievements ==
The team has provided hands-on training on disk forensics, mobile forensics & CDR analysis, Windows forensics, Internet-based crimes, open-source intelligence and social media analysis. The team has developed some tools for hashing, registry analysis and CDR analysis to ease up the process of Forensic analysis. NDCRTC won the Excellence Award in the category of Law Enforcement Capacity Building by DSCI at the Annual Information Security Summit 2016 (AISS2016)

== Trainings provided by NDCRTC on Cyber Crime Investigation & Digital Forensics to Officers from Foreign Nationals ==
- Sierra Leone Police
- Sri Lankan Police
- South Sudan Police

== See also ==
- Ministry of Home Affairs (MHA)
- Sardar Vallabhbhai Patel National Police Academy (SVPNPA)
