= Telangana Water, Land and Trees Act, 2002 =

Environmental legislation in the Indian state of Telangana

Andhra Pradesh Legislative Assembly
- Territorial extent: Telangana
- Enacted by: Andhra Pradesh Legislative Assembly
- Assented to: 18 April 2002

Related legislation
- ACT NO. 10 OF 2002
- Status: In force

The Telangana Water, Land and Trees Act, 2002 (commonly known as WALTA) is an environmental legislation governing the conservation and management of water resources, land and trees in the Indian state of Telangana. The legislation originated as the Andhra Pradesh Water, Land and Trees Act, 2002, enacted when Telangana was part of the undivided state of Andhra Pradesh. It was subsequently adapted for Telangana following the state's formation.

The Act provides a framework for regulating groundwater extraction, conserving surface water, promoting tree cover and protecting water bodies. Its implementation involves state, district and local-level authorities.

== Background ==
The legislation was originally enacted in the undivided state of Andhra Pradesh in 2002. Following the formation of Telangana in 2014, the legislation was adapted for the new state. It became one of the legal frameworks used by the state government for the management of groundwater, surface water and tree resources.

== Provisions ==
=== Groundwater regulation ===
The Act provides for the regulation of groundwater extraction and the registration and monitoring of wells. It seeks to control excessive groundwater exploitation, particularly in areas where groundwater resources are under pressure.

In April 2017, the Telangana government imposed restrictions on the digging of new borewells in 1,057 villages identified as having excessive groundwater extraction. The restrictions were reported as part of the state's implementation of WALTA.

=== Water conservation ===
The legislation provides for the conservation and sustainable use of surface and groundwater resources. It also addresses water harvesting, groundwater recharge and the protection of public water sources.

=== Protection of water bodies ===
The Act provides for the protection of lakes, village ponds and other water bodies. Its provisions include measures to prevent encroachment and changes to the intended use of protected water resources.

In January 2021, the Telangana High Court issued notices to government authorities in a case concerning alleged encroachment and pollution of Devuni Kunta Cheruvu in Hyderabad. The petition raised concerns about the implementation of the Telangana Water, Land and Trees Act and the protection of the lake.

=== Tree preservation ===
The legislation regulates the felling of trees and provides for measures to promote tree planting and preservation. Permission from designated authorities is required for the felling of trees covered by the relevant provisions.

In February 2020, a residential community in Hyderabad was fined ₹53,900 after more than 40 trees were felled on its premises without the required permission. The action was taken under WALTA.

== Implementation ==
Implementation of the Act involves different government departments and authorities responsible for groundwater management, irrigation, municipal administration, rural development and forest conservation.

In July 2019, few shortcomings were found in the implementation of WALTA. The report discussed continued groundwater exploitation and illegal borewell activity despite the regulatory framework established by the legislation.

In September 2024, Telangana government was considering the establishment of a dedicated authority to protect lakes and other water bodies under the Act. The report discussed the use of Section 23 for the designation of water bodies as heritage bodies and conservation areas.

In May 2025, the state-level WALTA Authority had recommended the establishment of a dedicated fund and the formation of authorities at district, divisional and mandal levels. The recommendations also included measures to improve groundwater monitoring, promote rainwater harvesting and increase public participation in conservation activities.

== Criticism ==
The implementation of WALTA has faced criticism over enforcement and the continued exploitation of groundwater resources. A July 2019 some gap was highlighted between the legislation's regulatory objectives and the continuing occurrence of illegal borewell drilling and groundwater depletion.

The effectiveness of the Act has also been discussed in connection with the protection of urban water bodies. The 2021 Devuni Kunta Cheruvu case highlighted concerns about the enforcement of existing legal protections against lake encroachment and pollution.

== See also ==
- Hyderabad Disaster Response and Asset Protection Agency
- Rainwater harvesting
- Environmental law
