= Shivrampalli =

Shivarampally is a major commercial and residential area in Hyderabad, Telangana. It provides connectivity to the Rajiv Gandhi International Airport. The P.V. Narasimha Rao Expressway passes through Shivrampally. Nehru Zoological Park, is the closest place to Shivarampally. Walmart and Metro Cash and Carry are close to Shivrampally. It is also famous for Ramdev Baba Temple.

The historic Rukn-ud-Daula lake constructed in 1770 A.D. is located here. This area has gained a lot of investment due to its connectivity to Airport.

Raghvendra Nagar colony is a housing society located in Shivrampally on National Highway 7. Raghvendra Nagar colony is very close to the Inner ring road and has become very popular since the airport has shifted from Begumpet to Shamshabad.

Sardar Vallabhbhai Patel National Police Academy is located in Shivrampally on National Highway 7. Sardar Vallabhbhai Patel National Police Academy is right opposite to Raghvendra Nagar Colony and about five-ten minutes drive from Nehru Zoological Park, Hyderabad.

== Neighbourhoods ==
- Attapur
- Rajendranagar
- Budwel
- Upparpally
- Kattedan
- Raghavendra Nagar Colony

== Transport ==
Shivarampally is connected to the rest of the city. TSRTC has services connecting Shivarampally to commuter hubs and destinations such as Mehdipatnam (300), Secunderabad (5, 49), Uppal (300), and Koti (95).
