= Sardar Vallabhbhai Patel National Police Academy =

Indian Police Service officers' training academy

- सरदार वल्लभभाई पटेल राष्ट्रीय पुलिस अकादमी
- Official logo of training Centre

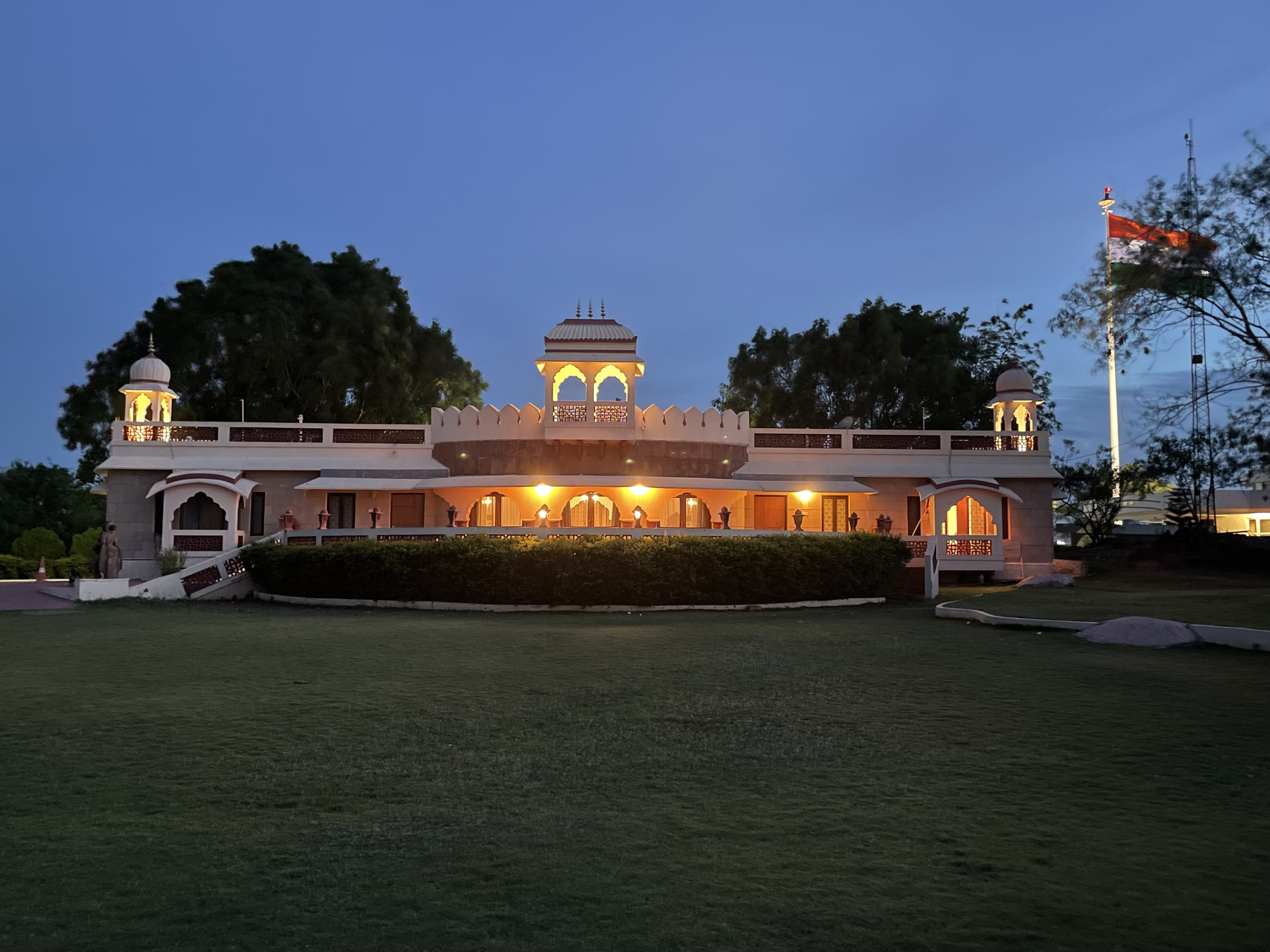
- Training Centre View
- Abbreviation: SVPNPA
- Formation: 15 September 1948; 78 years ago
- Type: Civil Service Training Institute
- Legal status: Foundation
- Purpose: IPS Training Centre
- Headquarters: Hyderabad
- Location: Shivrampalli, Hyderabad
- Region served: India
- Official language: English and Hindi
- Director: Amit Garg, IPS (additional charge)
- Parent organisation: Ministry of Home Affairs
- Affiliations: Government of India
- Staff: 427
- Website: www.svpnpa.gov.in

Sardar Vallabhbhai Patel National Police Academy (SVPNPA) is the training institute of Indian Police Service (IPS). It trains police officers before they are sent to their respective state cadres to carry out their duties. The academy is located in Shivrampalli, Hyderabad, Telangana, India.

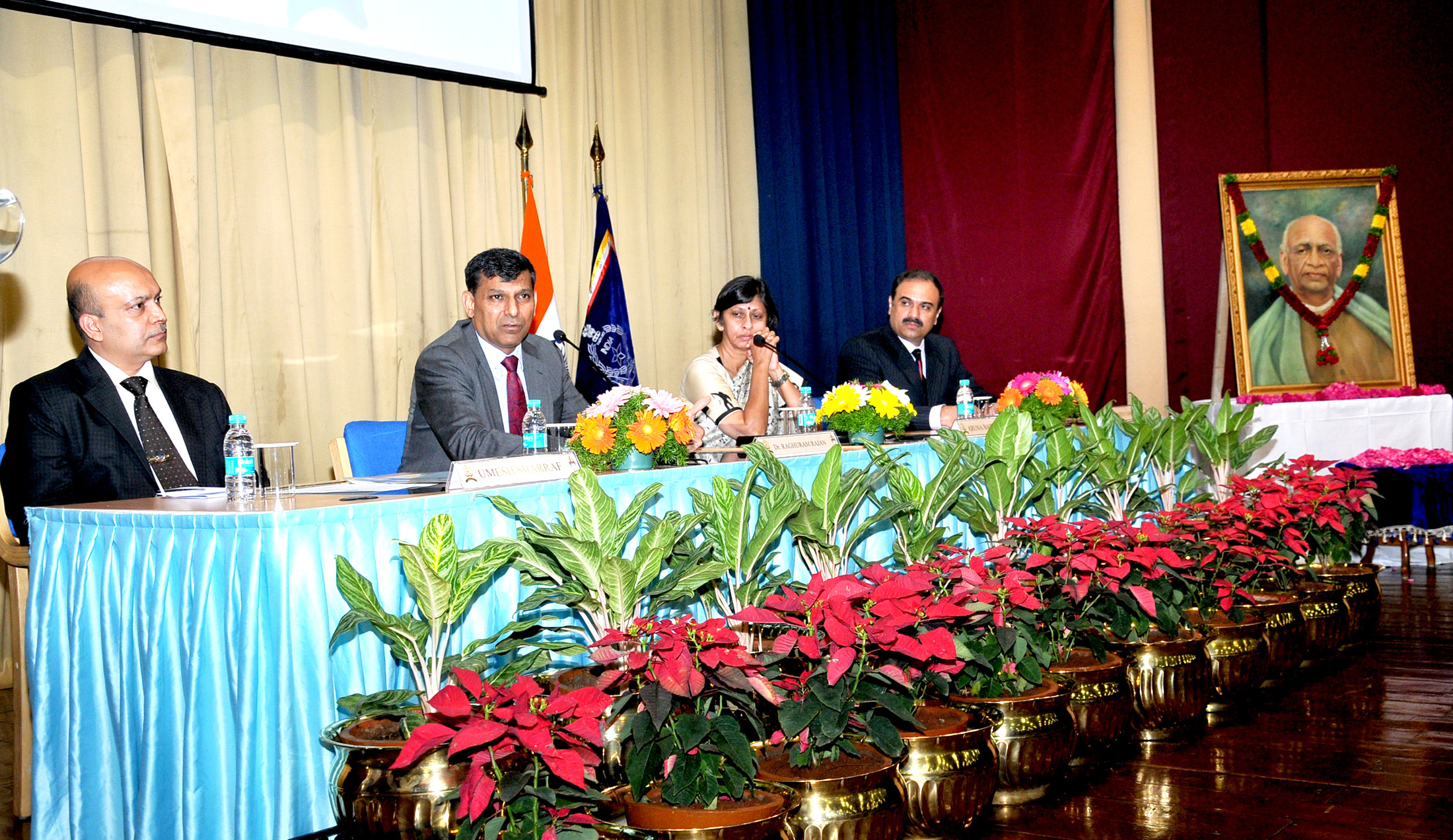
Dr. Raghuram Rajan, Governor, Reserve Bank of India, delivering the 30th Sardar Vallabhbhai Patel Memorial lecture on "Reforming India's Economic Institutions", at the Sardar Vallabhbhai Patel National Police Academy, in Hyderabad on October 23, 2015.

== History ==
The Sardar Vallabhbhai Patel National Police Academy was initially established as the National Police Academy on 15 September 1948, in Mount Abu, Rajasthan. This location served as the training ground for Indian Police Service (IPS) officers for nearly two decades.

In 1967, the institution was renamed the Central Police Training College to reflect its expanded role in police training across India.

In 1974, the academy was renamed to honor Sardar Vallabhbhai Patel, India's first Deputy Prime Minister and Home Minister, in recognition of his contributions to establishing the All India Services. In 1975, the academy relocated to Hyderabad, (Andhra Pradesh) Telangana, which provided it with more extensive facilities and resources. The current campus spans 277 acres, previously used as police training grounds for the Nizam of Hyderabad.

== Campus ==
The 277-acre campus is located in Hyderabad on the National Highway 44.

== Training ==
It trains officers of the Indian Police Service, who have been selected through the All-India Civil Services Examination. The trained officers will be posted as Assistant Superintendent of Police (ASP) in their respective states under whom the other sub-ranks of police force will be working. The recruitment of sub-ranks such as constables, sub-inspectors, inspectors, Deputy Superintendent of Police is each state's prerogative and will be done by respective state director generals of police. The IPS cadre is controlled by the Home Ministry of the Government of India and the officer of this service can only be appointed or removed by an order of the President of India.

Apart from the Basic Training Course for IPS officers the Academy conducts three In-service Management Development Programmes for officers of Superintendent of Police, Deputy Inspector General of Police and Inspector General levels of the Indian Police Service; 'Training of Trainers' Courses for the trainers of police training institutions in the country; IPS Induction Training Course for State Police Service Officers; and short specialised thematic courses, seminars and workshops on professional subjects for all levels of police officers. Foreign police officers and other officers belonging to IRS/IAS/IFS/Judiciary/CAPF, public sector undertakings, nationalised banks, insurance companies etc. also attend specialised courses conducted here from time to time. The academy is affiliated to Osmania University for conducting courses on police subjects for IPS officers.

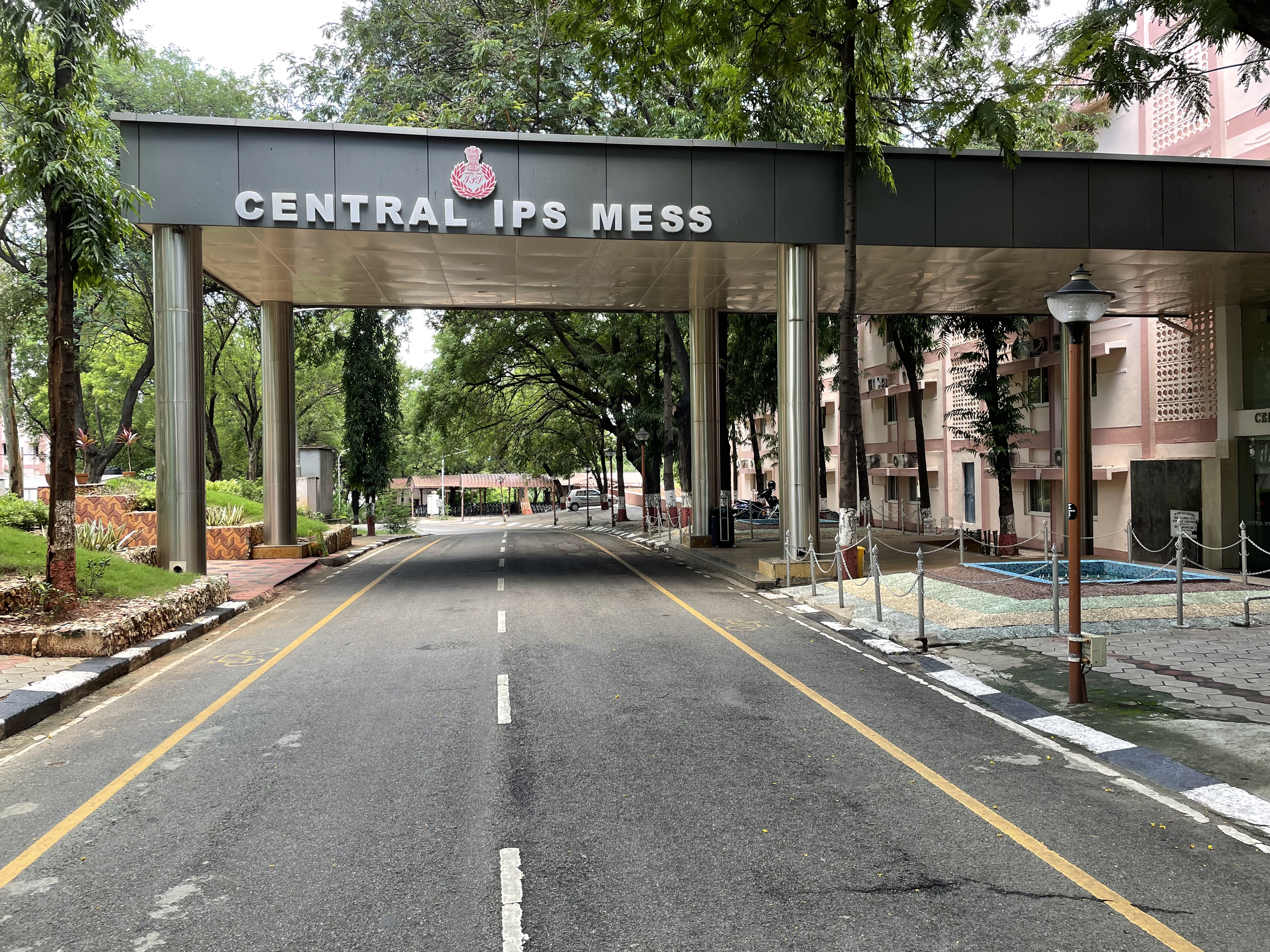
Central IPS Mess

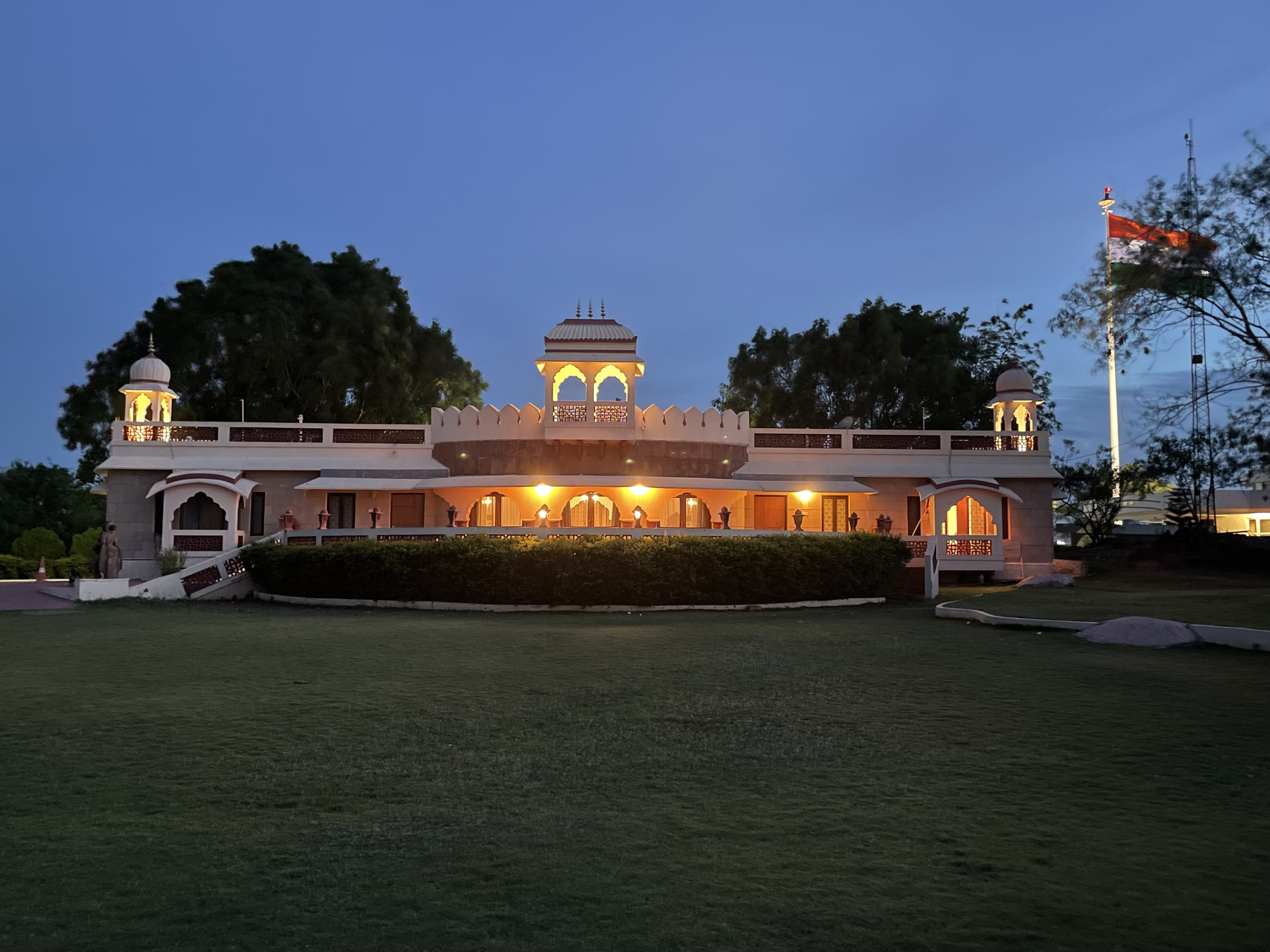
View of the Rajasthan Bhavan situated within the Academy

== President's colours ==
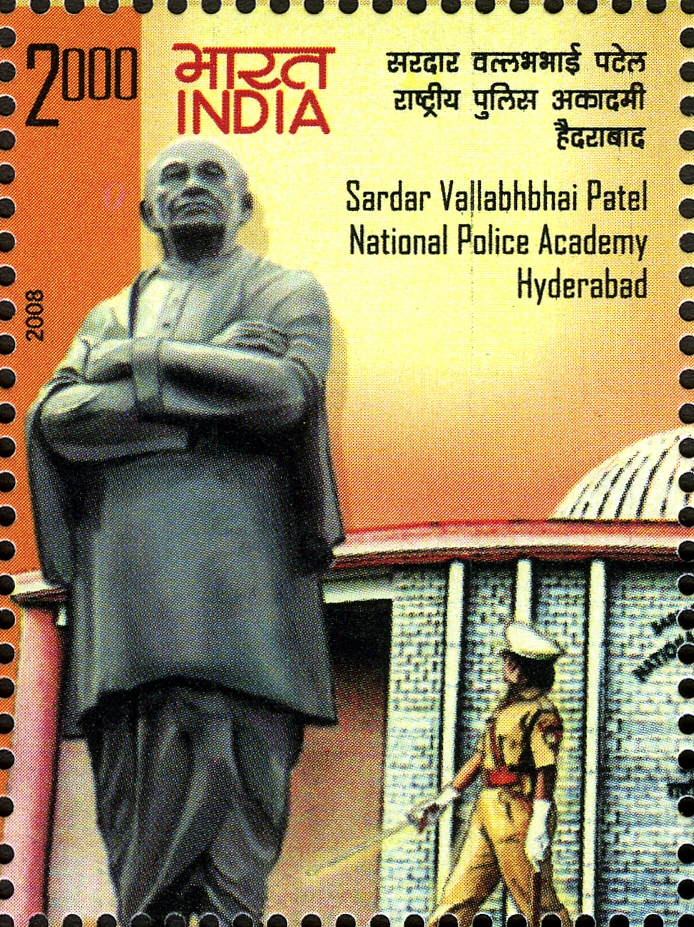
A 2008 stamp dedicated to Vallabhbhai Patel National Police Academy

In recognition of the outstanding achievements of the academy and its service to the nation, the academy received the President's Colours on its 40th anniversary on 15 September 1988.

== Organisation ==
The Academy is headed by a Director, an IPS officer of the rank of Director General of Police (3-star rank) and assisted by 2 Joint Directors of the rank of Inspector General of Police, 3 Deputy Directors of the rank of Deputy Inspector General of Police, and 20 Assistant Directors. The Assistant Directors include 8 IPS/SPS officers of the rank of Superintendent of Police from state cadres, a Forensic Scientist, an Indian Judicial Service Officer, a specialist each in Training Methodology, Computers and Wireless. The sanctioned strength of the faculty includes management professors, reader in Behavioural Sciences, reader in Teaching Methodology, medical officers, junior scientific officer, Hindi instructor, photographic officer and chief drill instructor. The supporting staff include administrative, ministerial and medical staff and other Group D employees.

== List of directors ==
S.No.	Name	Cadre & batch	Appointment date	Left office
1	P. L. Mehta, IP	West Bengal	15 September 1948	31 January 1954
2	Waryam Singh, IP	Punjab, 1941	11 February 1954	5 November 1956
3	A. R. Jayavant, IP	Madhya Pradesh	8 March 1957	16 May 1958
4	G. K. Handoo, IP	United Provinces	17 May 1958	30 October 1960
5	B. B. Banerjee, IP	Bihar, 1934	14 March 1961	28 February 1962
6	S. C. Mishra, IP	United Provinces, 1933	24 March 1962	7 December 1967
(5)	B. B. Banerjee, IP	Bihar, 1934	1 January 1968	31 January 1970
7	A. K. Ghosh, IP	Bihar	1 February 1970	10 July 1971
8	S. G. Gokhale, IPS	Maharashtra, 1949	1 February 1972	31 July 1974
9	S. M. Diaz, IPS	Tamil Nadu, 1949	11 September 1974	28 February 1977
10	R. D. Singh, IPS	Bihar	7 November 1977	4 February 1979
11	P. A. Rosha, IPS	Haryana, 1948	5 February 1979	18 September 1979
12	B. K. Ray, IPS	Odisha, 1948	11 November 1979	31 January 1982
13	G. C. Singhvi, IPS	Rajasthan, 1951	18 February 1983	30 November 1985
14	A. A. Ali, IPS	Madhya Pradesh, 1955	2 December 1985	31 March 1990
15	P. D. Malviya, IPS	Madhya Pradesh, 1957	12 September 1990	31 December 1991
16	Shankar Sen, IPS	Odisha, 1960	2 April 1992	31 May 1994
17	A. P. Durai, IPS	Karnataka, 1962	1 July 1994	28 September 1996
18	Trinath Mishra, IPS	Uttar Pradesh, 1965	12 June 1996	6 December 1997
19	P. V. Rajagopal, IPS	Madhya Pradesh, 1965	29 June 1998	31 May 2001
20	M. K. Shukla, IPS	Madhya Pradesh, 1966	29 June 1998	31 May 2001
21	Ganeshwar Jha, IPS	Uttar Pradesh, 1967	11 July 2002	31 July 2004
22	Kamal Kumar, IPS	Andhra Pradesh, 1971	1 October 2004	31 October 2006
23	Dr. G. S. Rajagopal, IPS	Rajasthan, 1971	11 July 2002	31 July 2004
24	K. Vijay Kumar, IPS	Tamil Nadu, 1975	1 December 2008	5 May 2010
25	Rajiv Mathur, IPS	Chhattisgarh, 1974	22 October 2010	30 September 2011
26	V. N. Rai, IPS	Haryana, 1977	2 November 2011	31 December 2012
27	Subhas Goswami, IPS	Assam, 1977	7 March 2013	8 November 2013
28	Aruna Bahuguna, IPS	Telangana, 1979	28 January 2014	28 February 2017
29	D. R. Doley Burman, IPS	Jammu and Kashmir, 1986	1 March 2017	29 March 2019
30	Abhay, IPS	Odisha, 1986	30 March 2019	7 November 2019
31	Atul Karwal, IPS	Gujarat, 1988	27 December 2019	29 June 2022
32	A. S. Rajan, IPS	Bihar, 1987	30 June 2022	28 February 2023
33	Amit Garg, IPS (additional charge)	Andhra Pradesh, 1993	1 March 2023	7 July 2026

== See also ==
- Indian Police Service
- Law enforcement in India
- Indian Police Foundation and Institute
- Bureau of Police Research and Development
- National Crime Records Bureau
- NDCRTC
- Telangana State Police Academy
- Internal Security Academy
