= Atul Karwal =

Indian police officer

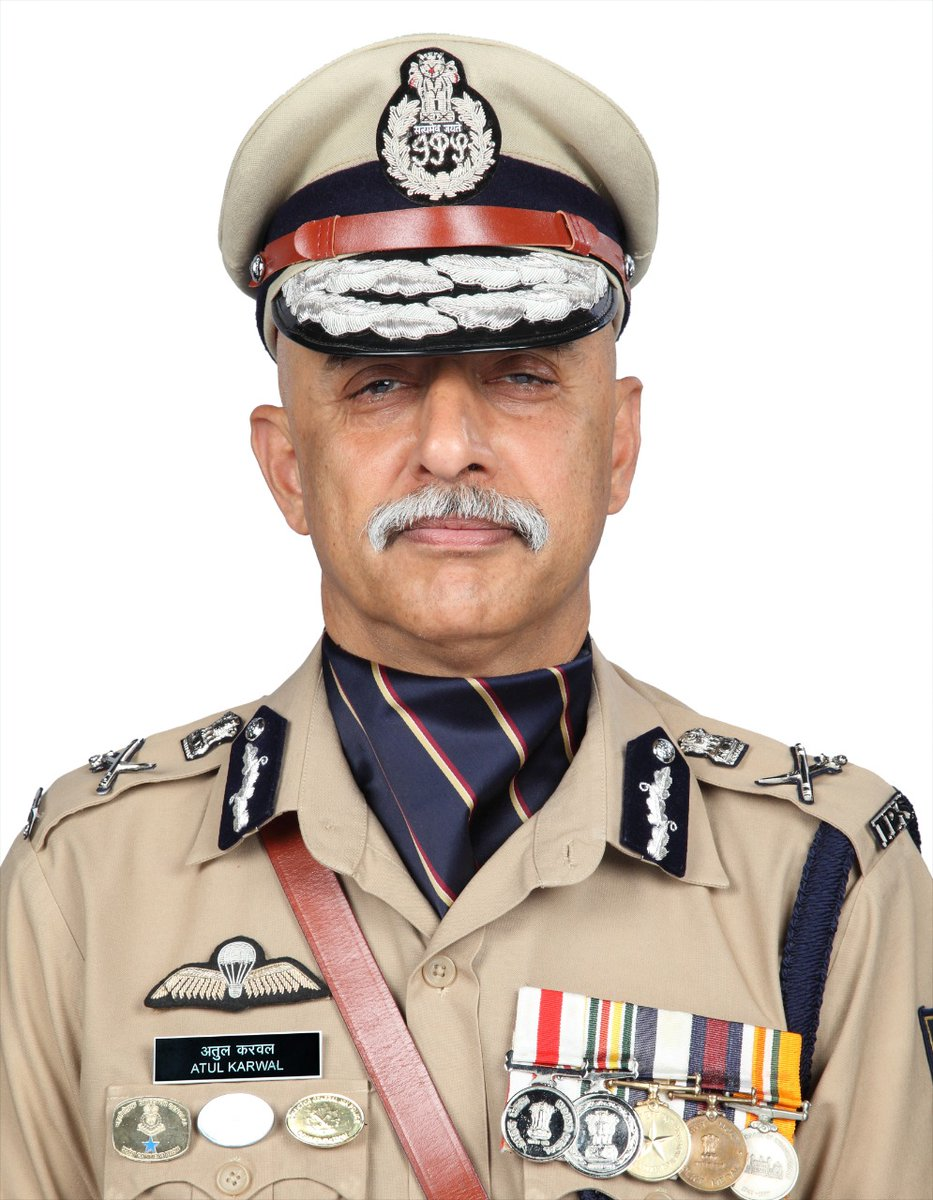
Atul Karwal, Photo from his stint as the Director of Sardar Vallbhbhai Patel National Police Academy

Atul Karwal is an Indian police officer. He served as the Director of National Police Academy and also as the Director General of National Disaster Response Force. Karwal climbed Mount Everest in May 2008 and became the first Indian civil servant to do so.

== Career ==
He joined the elite Indian Police Service in 1988 and was Superintendent of Police in five districts in the State of Gujarat (Valsad, Rajkot Rural, Porbandar, Junagadh, Mehsana), and Deputy Commissioner of Police in Vadodara, Surat and Ahmadabad. He was also Commandant, State Reserve Police Force, Group 13, Rajkot.

As Assistant Director (Outdoor Training) in Sardar Vallabhbhai Patel National Police Academy, Hyderabad, from 1998-2002, he trained 4 batches of Indian Police Service officers. As Deputy Inspector General of Police, he served as DIG Planning and Modernization, in DGP Office, Gandhinagar. As Inspector-General of Police, he served as IG, Anti-Terrorist Squad, Gujarat, Joint CP (Traffic) and Joint CP, Sector-2, Ahmedabad City, Jt. Director, Gujarat Police Academy. As Inspector General of Police, he commanded 23 battalions of the Central Reserve Police Force in Kashmir Valley in the late 2010s. He was also IG (Training), Central Reserve Police Force(CRPF), IG (Personnel) CRPF and Additional Director General (Personnel), CRPF, before joining the National Police Academy as Director.

As the head of the National Disaster Response Force, he coordinated Operation Dost, the search and rescue operation initiated by the Government of India to aid Syria and Turkey, after the 2023 Turkey–Syria earthquakes.

He is an ultra-marathoner, a triathlete, a Black Belt in martial arts and trained in scuba diving. He has authored a book titled Think Everest: Scaling Mountains with the Mind and occasionally contributes Op-eds in national dailies.

== Awards ==
He has been awarded the Police Medal for meritorious service in 2010 and the President's Police Medal for distinguished service in 2016. He received the Police Medal for Gallantry twice, on Republic Day 2020 and Independence Day 2020 for leading operations in Kashmir.
