= Anjal Prakash =

Academic, scientist

- Born: 6 March 1972 (age 54); Jamshedpur, Jharkhand, India
- Citizenship: Indian
- Education: (PhD) Wageningen University and Research Centre, (Post Graduation) Tata Institute of Social Sciences and (Under Graduation) Center for Research on New International Economic Order (Crenieo)
- Alma mater: Wageningen University
- Occupations: Academician, Researcher
- Employer(s): FLAME University, Pune, India
- Title: Dr

Anjal Prakash is an academic, researcher, and science writer, currently working as Professor, Public Policy, Faculty of Liberal Education, FLAME University, Pune, India. Earlier he was a Clinical Associate Professor and Research Director at Bharti Institute of Public Policy, Indian School of Business (ISB), Hyderabad, India. His research explores sustainability, urban resilience, water and climate challenges, and gender and social inclusion in South Asia.

Recently, Anjal was selected as the lead author for the prestigious special report, a part of the United Nations' Intergovernmental Panel on Climate Change's (IPCC) seventh assessment cycle. He is one of the four Indians in the 150 global climate experts group as a lead author for the special report on climate change and cities. He previously reported on gender bias in the IPCC.

== Education and work ==
He completed his master's degree from Tata Institute of Social Sciences, Mumbai, India, and PhD in Social/Environmental Sciences from Wageningen University in the Netherlands. Previously, he served as an Associate Professor and Associate Dean at TERI School of Advanced Studies, and as a Programme Coordinator, Himalayan Water Adaptation and Resilience (HI-AWARE) Research, River Basin Programmes, International Centre for Integrated Mountain Development. He also served as the Director of SaciWATERs (South Asia Consortium for Interdisciplinary Water Resources Studies).

His contributions focus on water and climate issues in South Asia. He led research on glaciated rivers in the Himalayan region.

He is an elected member of Global Water Partnership,Gender and Water Alliance, and a member of Global Community of Practice for Sanitation and Hygiene promoted by Water Supply and Sanitation Collaborative Council, Geneva, Switzerland.

As a professor and researcher, he spoke on climate science, climate justice, climate change, global warming, social policy, global sustainability initiatives and other similar topics in seminars, events, and conferences organized by reputed academic institutions. His columns on climate change, global warming, water crisis, and sustainable development appear in national newspapers and magazines such as Forbes India, Hindustan Times, Indian Express, The Tribune, and others.

He is on editorial board of leading scientific journal publications, serving as guest editor, associate editor for various reputed journals such as Environment and Urbanization Asia (published by Sage Publications), Current Research in Environmental Sustainability (published by Elsevier), Journal of Integrative Environmental Sciences (published by Routledge), PLOS, and other journals. Together with Prof Ashwini Chhatre and Dr Aarushi Jain, he is also a series editor of Indian School of Business's Bharti Institute of Public Policy-Routledge Book Series titled - Innovations, Practice and Future of Public Policy in India.

== Publications ==
Prakash has published more than 34 research papers and has co-edited nine books and 29 book chapters.

== Books ==
He has authored and edited the following books:

- The Dark Zone: Groundwater, Irrigation, Politics and Social Power in North Gujarat (published by Orient Longman), ISBN 978-81-250-2824-6
- Water Resources Policies in South Asia (Published by Routledge India, ISBN 978-0-415-81198-9)
- Informing Water Policies in South Asia (published by Routledge India, ISBN 978-0-415-71059-6)
- Water Resource Management in South Asia (published by Routledge India, ISBN 978-0-367-17670-9)
- Water in Himalayan Towns: Lessons for Adaptive Water Governance (published by Iwa Pub, ISBN 978-1-78906-189-5)
- Engendering Climate Change: Learning from South Asia (published by Routledge, ISBN 978-0-8153-6165-7
- Technology, Policy, and Inclusion (published by Routledge India, ISBN 978-1-032-22545-6)
- Narain, Vishal (2016), "Introduction: urbanization, Climate Change, and Peri-urban Water Security in South Asia - A framework for Analysis", in Narain, Vishal; Prakash, Anjal (eds.), WATER SECURITY in PERI-URBAN SOUTH ASIA, India: Oxford University Press, ISBN 978-0-19-946416-6
- Narain, Vishal (2014), "Urbanization and water: A conundrum and source of conflict?", in Narain, Vishal; Goodrich, Chanda Gurung; Chourey, Jayati; Prakash, Anjal (eds.), Globalization of Water governance in South Asia, India: Routledge, ISBN 978-0-415-71066-4
- Hans, Asha; Rao, Nitya; Prakash, Anjal; Patel, Amrita (2021-02-25). Engendering Climate Change: Learnings from South Asia. Taylor & Francis. ISBN 978-1-000-33539-2
- Prakash, Anjal; Vs, Saravanan; Chourey, Jayati (2012-02-09). Interlacing Water and Human Health: Case Studies from South Asia. SAGE Publishing India. ISBN 978-81-321-1665-3
