= Ramanthapur Lake =

- Location within Telangana
- Location: Hyderabad, Telangana, India
- Coordinates: 17.42124°N 78.55403°E
- Type: natural lake
- Basin countries: India
- Surface area: 9 acres (3.6 ha)
- Surface elevation: 1,759 ft (536 m)
- Settlements: Ramanthapur

Ramanthapur Lake, also known as Pedda Cheruvu, is a lake located in Ramanthapur, Hyderabad. It is one of the largest lakes in Hyderabad. 'Pedda Cheruvu' means 'Large Lake' in Telugu language.
