= Environment and Urbanization ASIA =

- Discipline: Environmental studies
- Language: English
- Edited by: Debolina Kundu

Publication details
- History: 2010
- Publisher: Sage Publications India Pvt. Ltd.
- Frequency: Bi-annually
- Impact factor: 1.3

Standard abbreviations
- ISO 4: Environ. Urban. Asia

Indexing
- ISSN: 0975-4253 (print); 0976-3546 (web)

Links
- Journal homepage; Online access; Online archive

Environment and Urbanization ASIA is a peer-reviewed journal published twice a year by Sage in association with National Institute of Urban Affairs. It is edited by Debolina Kundu.

== Abstracting and indexing ==
Environment and Urbanization Asia is abstracted and indexed in:

- Australian Business Deans Council (ABDC)
- Bibliography of Asian Studies (BAS)
- Clarivate Analytics: Emerging Sources Citation Index (ESCI)
- DeepDyve
- Dutch-KB
- EBSCO
- Indian Citation Index (ICI)
- International Bibliography of the Social Sciences
- J-Gate
- OCLC
- Ohio
- Portico
- Pro-Quest-RSP
- SCOPUS
- UGC-CARE (GROUP II)
- http://www.niua.org/environment-and-urbanization-asia
