= Hyderabad Disaster Response and Asset Protection Agency =

Statutory body in Hyderabad, India

Hyderabad Disaster Response and Asset Protection Agency (HYDRAA)

Agency overview
- Formed: 19 July 2024
- Jurisdiction: Telangana Core Urban Region (TCUR), including Greater Hyderabad Municipal Corporation (GHMC), Rangareddy, Medchal Malkajgiri, and Sangareddy districts up to Outer Ring Road (ORR)
- Headquarters: Hyderabad, Telangana, India
- Agency executive: AV Ranganath, (IPS), Commissioner
- Parent department: Municipal Administration and Urban Development Department, Government of Telangana
- Website: https://hydraa.telangana.gov.in

Footnotes
- HYDRAA has three wings: Asset Protection, Disaster Management, and Logistics Support. It is responsible for disaster response, asset protection, encroachment removal, inspection, and coordination with other agencies

The Hyderabad Disaster Response and Asset Protection Agency (HYDRAA) is a statutory body in Hyderabad which is responsible for the protection of public property and disaster management in the city. It was formed in July 2024 by reorganising the city's Enforcement Vigilance and Disaster Management Department (EV&DM).

AV Ranganath, an Inspector-General belonging to the Indian Police Service is currently serving as the Commissioner of HYDRAA.

== Formation ==
As Chief Minister, Revanth Reddy was vocal against residential and commercial builders encroaching on lakes and other public property.

On 19 July 2024, the Government of Telangana has established Hyderabad Disaster Response and Asset Protection Agency by way of Government Order (G.O.) 99 issued by the Municipal Administration and Urban Development ministry. In November 2024, Telangana High Court upheld the constitutionality of HYDRAA, affirming its establishment under the Telangana Irrigation Act (originally the Telangana Irrigation Act, 1357 Fasli) and the Telangana Water, Land and Trees Act, 2002 (WALTA).

Under Core Urban Region (Integrated Governance) Act, 2026, HYDRAA is granted formal statutory recognition and expanded enforcement powers to protect public assets from encroachments. Its jurisdiction covers lakes, ponds, Full Tank Level (FTL) zones, buffer zones, canals, nalas, parks, playgrounds, and government lands.

== Composition ==
HYDRAA consists of three wings: Asset Protection Wing, Disaster Management Wing and Logistics Support Wing.

=== Asset Protection Wing ===
The Asset Protection Wing is tasked with protecting government assets and public property such as parks, open spaces, playgrounds, lakes, carriageways, and footpaths and Advertisements from encroaching structures. It coordinates with the Greater Hyderabad Municipal Corporation, Hyderabad City Police and Cyberabad Police to carry out its duties.

=== Disaster Management Wing ===
The Disaster Management Wing deals with disaster response and operates a Disaster Response Force (DRF) to manage and respond to disasters. It cooperates with national and regional disaster response agencies like the National Disaster Response Force and the Telangana Disaster Response and Fire Service, the state's fire brigade.

=== Logistics Support Wing ===
The Logistics Support Wing carries out staff recruitment and administrative duties for the agency.

== HYDRAA Police Station ==
On 8 May 2025, the Hyderabad Disaster Response and Asset Protection Agency (HYDRAA) inaugurated its first dedicated police station, at Buddha Bhavan, Secunderabad. The station is spread over 10,500 square feet, and is headed by an Assistant Commissioner of Police and staffed with 6 inspectors, 12 sub-inspectors, and 30 constables specifically deputed to handle cases related to land encroachments, forgery, damage to public property, and disaster response within HYDRAA’s jurisdiction. To support its enforcement and rapid response duties, the station is equipped with a fleet of 70 vehicles, including DCMs, Scorpio cars, and motorcycles. This specialized police station is said to enable quicker registration and investigation of cases involving illegal occupation and damage to government assets such as lakes, parks, roads, and drainage systems.

It is expected that the establishment of the HYDRAA police station strengthens the agency’s mandate to protect public property and prevent urban flooding caused by blocked drainage and encroachments. Telangana Chief Minister A. Revanth Reddy emphasized the importance of firm action against wealthy encroachers while urging compassion for vulnerable populations affected by removals. He also announced plans to expand the HYDRAA policing system across Telangana, setting up similar stations in all districts to intensify surveillance and enforcement against land-related crimes. This development marks a significant step in Hyderabad’s efforts to safeguard its heritage, improve civic management, and enhance disaster preparedness.

== Demolition Drives ==
On 24th August 2024, HYDRAA demolished the N-Convention owned by Actor Nagarjuna.
