= Maktha Mahaboobpet =

Municipal ward in Hyderabad, Telangana, India

Maktha Mahabubpet Maqtha Mahaboobpet
- Neighbourhood
- Clockwise from top: Pedda Kudi Cheruvu, Ambedkar statue miyapur maktha, Boundary bites maktha miyapur, Nsk platina entranace maktha, Pochamma temple maktha, Vishwanaadha Gardens jp nagar maktha

- Location in Telangana, India Maktha Mahabubpet (Telangana) Maktha Mahabubpet (India)
- Coordinates: 17.516017°N 78.348768°E
- Country: India
- State: Telangana
- District: Ranga Reddy
- City: Hyderabad
- Revenue Division: Rajendranagar
- Revenue Mandal: Serilingampally (Mandal Code #6)
- GHMC Circle Wise Delimitation Election Ward: West Zone, Serilingampally (North), Circle-48, Miyapur, Ward-241

Government
  - Type: Municipal Corporation
  - Body: CMC
  - MLA: Arekapudi Gandhi
  - Member of Parliament: Konda Vishweshwar Reddy

Languages
  - Official: Telugu
- Time zone: UTC+5:30 (IST)
- PIN: 500049
- Vehicle registration: TG-07
- Lok Sabha constituency: Chevella (Lok Sabha constituency)
- Vidhan Sabha constituency: Serilingampally (Vidan Sabha constituency)
- Website: cmc.telangana.gov.in

Maktha Mahabubpet (also spelled Maktha Mahaboobpet, Maqta Mahboobpet or Mahaboobpet Maktha) is a residential and commercial locality in the northwestern suburbs of Hyderabad, Telangana, India. It is a municipal ward, situated in the Miyapur area, within the Serilingampally mandal of Ranga Reddy district, and forms part of the Cyberabad Municipal Corporation (CMC) Ward 241 . The locality is known for its proximity to major IT hubs like Gachibowli and features a mix of urban residential colonies, small-scale commercial establishments, and natural landmarks such as lakes and temples. It is accessible via National Highway 65 (NH65), connecting Hyderabad to Pune and Machilipatnam.

The name "Maktha" likely derives from Telugu words referring to a "maqta" or granted land estate, while "Mahaboobpet" may trace back to historical Muslim settlements in the region, common in Hyderabad's nomenclature during the Nizam era. The area has grown rapidly due to Hyderabad's metropolitan expansion, transitioning from a rural village to an integrated urban suburb.

== History ==
Prior to the 2016 district reorganization in Telangana, it fell under the erstwhile Ranga Reddy district (previously Hyderabad Rural District, formed in 1978). The area was listed in early census records, such as the 1971 District Census Handbook for Hyderabad, as "Mahaboobpet (Maktha)," indicating its status as a small revenue village with agricultural significance.

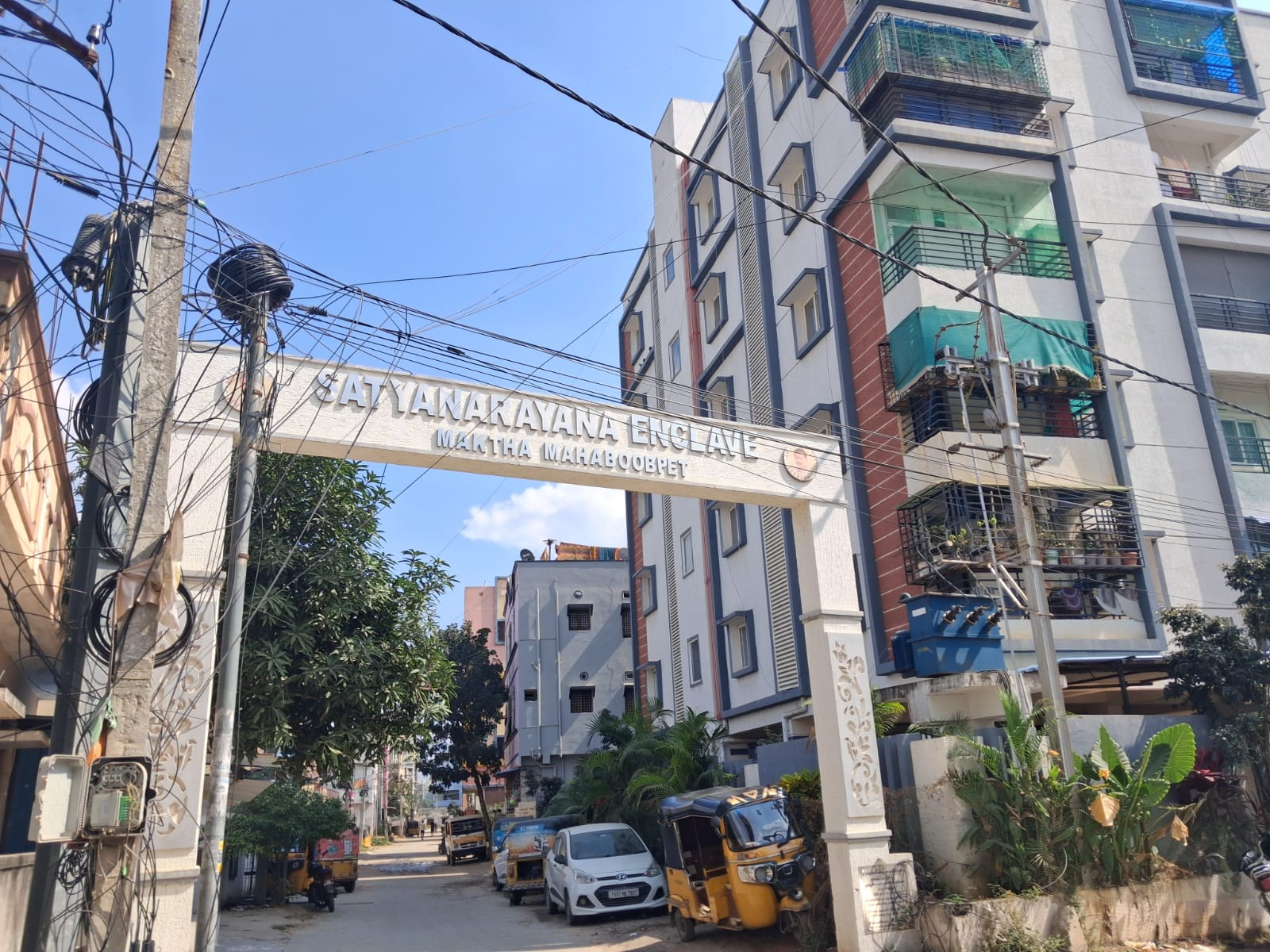
Satyanarayana enclave maktha mahboobpet,miyapur

In December 2025, Government of Telangana made Maktha Mahabubpet a municipal ward within Miyapur Circle under Serilingampally Zone, as part of restructuring of GHMC.

== Geography ==
Maktha Mahabubpet is located at approximately 17.516017°N 78.348768°E, at an elevation of about 536 meters on the Deccan Plateau. It covers a small geographical area, classified as a ward in administrative records, and is bordered by neighborhoods such as Madeenaguda to the north, Hafeezpet to the west, and Chandanagar to the southwest. The terrain is typical of Hyderabad's savanna climate (tropical wet and dry), with average annual rainfall of around 800 mm and temperatures ranging from 15 to 40°C.The locality features several water bodies, including the prominent Maktha Mahaboobpet Lake, which serves as a local reservoir and recreational spot. Nearby lakes in the Miyapur cluster include Miyapur Cheruvu (Gurunatham Cheruvu), Meedi Kunta (BK Enclave lake) and Patel Cheruvu. Mineral resources in the broader Serilingampally mandal include quartz, feldspar, and limestone, with limited sand quarrying activities.

== Demographics ==
As per the 2011 Census of India, Maktha Mahabubpet is recorded as a village in Serilingampally tehsil, Ranga Reddy district, but specific population figures are not separately enumerated in available public data, likely due to its small size and integration into urban Miyapur. The primary languages spoken are Telugu and Urdu, with Hindi also common due to migration. It falls under the Chevella (Lok Sabha constituency) and Serilingampally (Vidan Sabha constituency).

== Landmarks ==
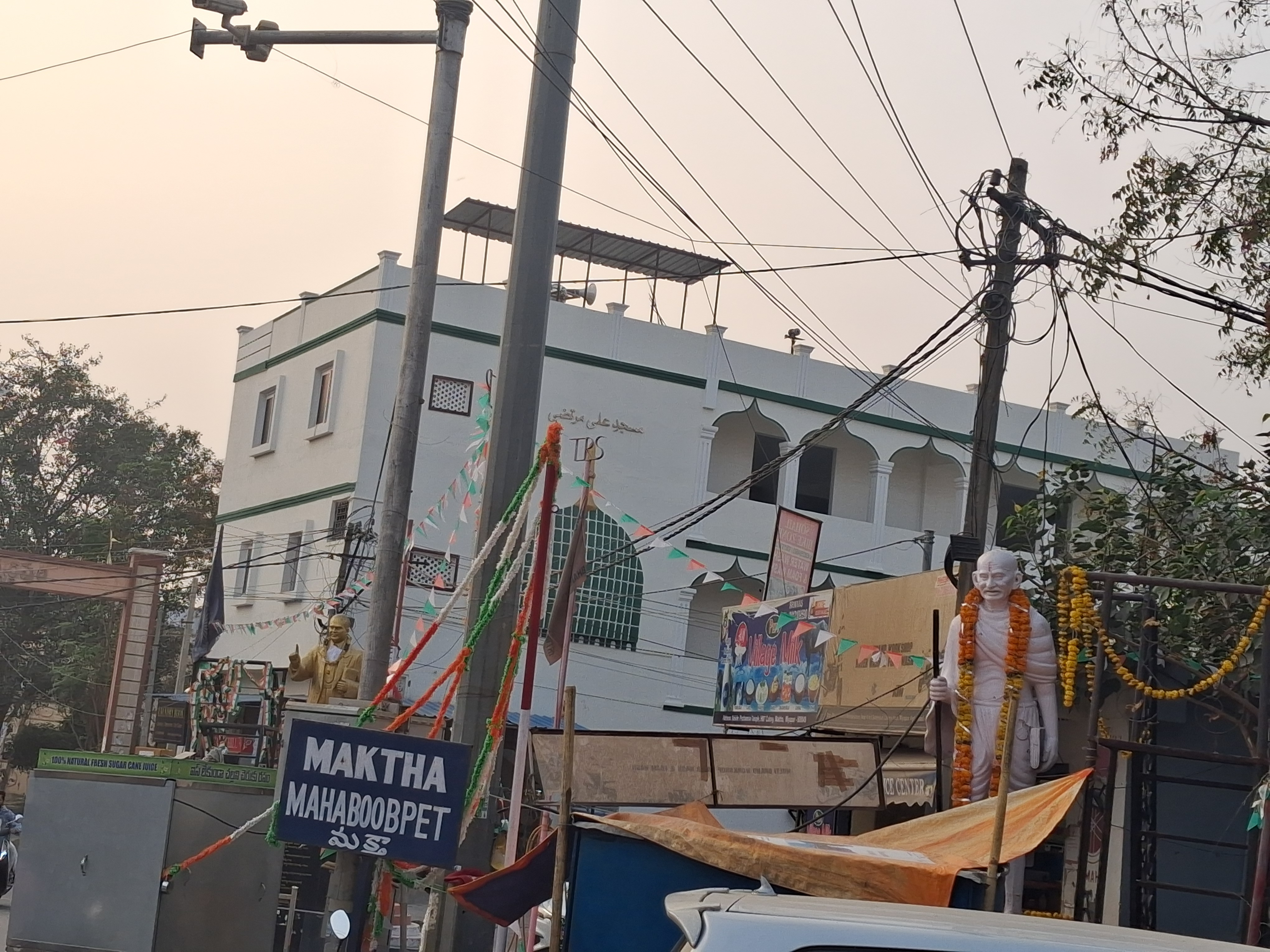
Maktha Mahabubpet full chowk view

Maktha Mahabubpet hosts several religious and natural landmarks, reflecting its cultural diversity:

- Maktha Mahaboobpet Lake (Pedda Kudi Cheruvu): A key water body in Maktha Mahabubpet area, used for local recreation and supporting biodiversity. There is plan to have walking/running track around the lake. The Full Tank Level (FTL) area is recorded at 17.20 acres, making it a moderately sized lake within the Serilingampally region.
- Pochamma Temple: A local Hindu temple dedicated to Goddess Pochamma, village (Gramadevata) and mother goddess .
- Venkateshwara Temple: Site for Hindu worship, especially during festivals.
- Maktha Masjid (Masjid-e-Ali Murtuza) and Masjid-e-Habeeb Unnisa: Mosque serving the Muslim community.
- BK Enclave Community Center - organizes Oikotan The Culture Of Bengal, Miyapur, Hyderabad.
- Sri Ganesh Children Park, Janapriya west city, bus stop, Meghana Enclave, Miyapur

Other nearby attractions include :

- Sri SeetaRamanjaneya Swamy Devastanamu (Ramalayam) in the broader Miyapur region, known for its annual festivals.
- Vishwanaadha Gardens: A versatile and elegantly designed event venue offering both air-conditioned banquet hall and a spacious outdoor lawn.
- Lohia Convention & Garden: A premier event venue.

== Educational institutions ==
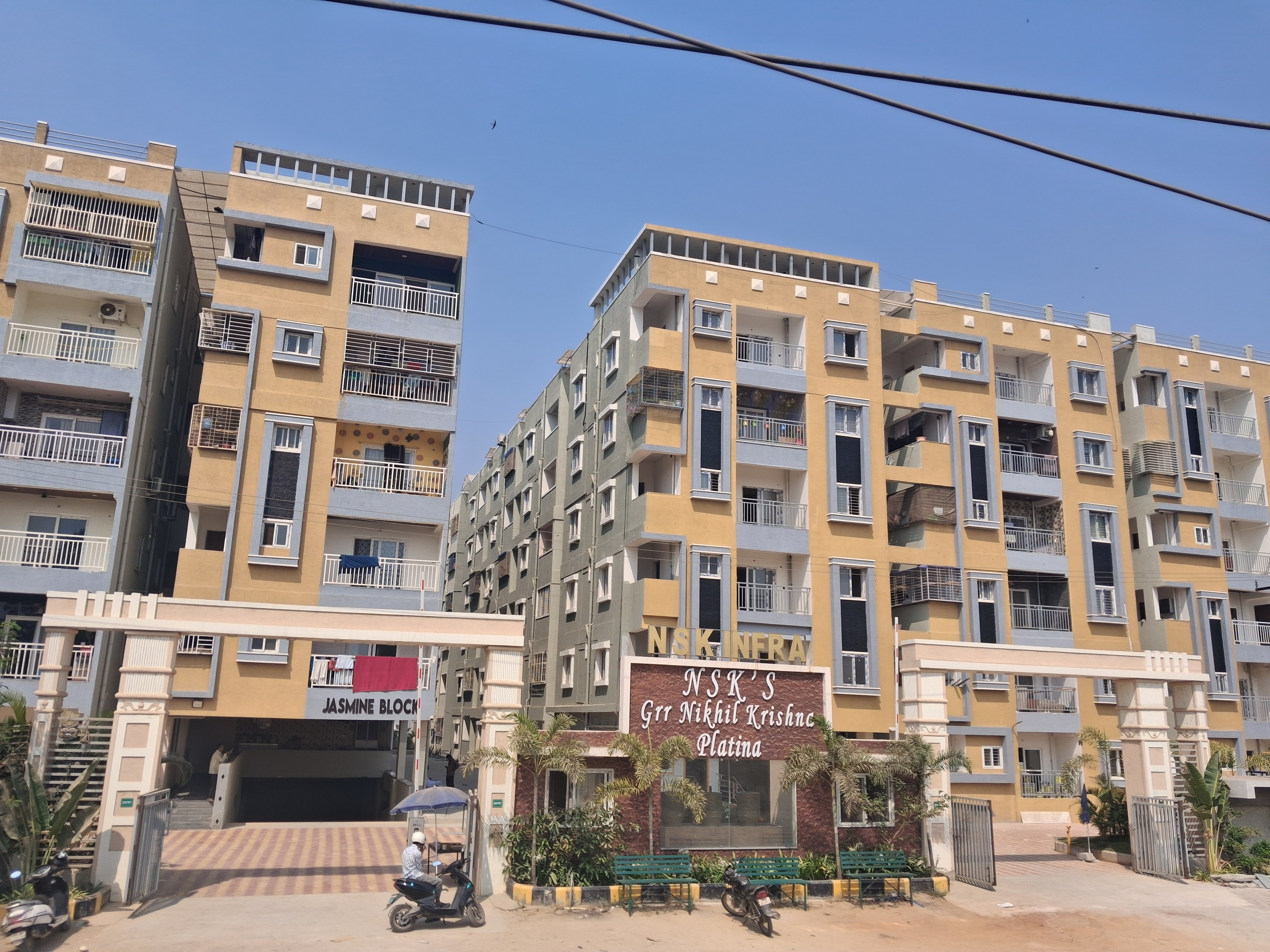
NSK Platina mid-rise Gated Maqta Mahboobpet Miyapur hyderabad

Some prominent institutions in and around the area are:

- Sentia The Global School, beside Nivriti Homes, BK Enclave, Miyapur, Hyderabad (CBSE)
- Vikas The Concept School,Sai Krishnaja Hls Rd, off Miyapur Road (CBSE)
- Janapriya School West City, Maktha Mahaboobpet, Miyapur (CBSE)
- Surya The Global School, Bachupally
- MNR (Indo-European) Scottsdale Schools, HMT Swarnapuri Colony (CBSE)
- FirstCry Intellitots Preschool & Daycare - HMT Swarnapuri Colony
- The Creek Planet School - Sr Seeds - Primary Campus (CBSE)
- Kleos International School in Jaya Prakash Narayan Nagar, Miyapur (CBSE)
- Platinum The Concept School, KPN Nagar, Miyapur
- Canary The School, Madinaguda, Landmark: beside MLA Camp office, Miyapur (IB and CBSE)
- Genesis International School, Chandanagar
- Gokaraju Rangaraju Institute of Engineering and Technology, Nizampet Rd, Bachupally

== Hospitals ==
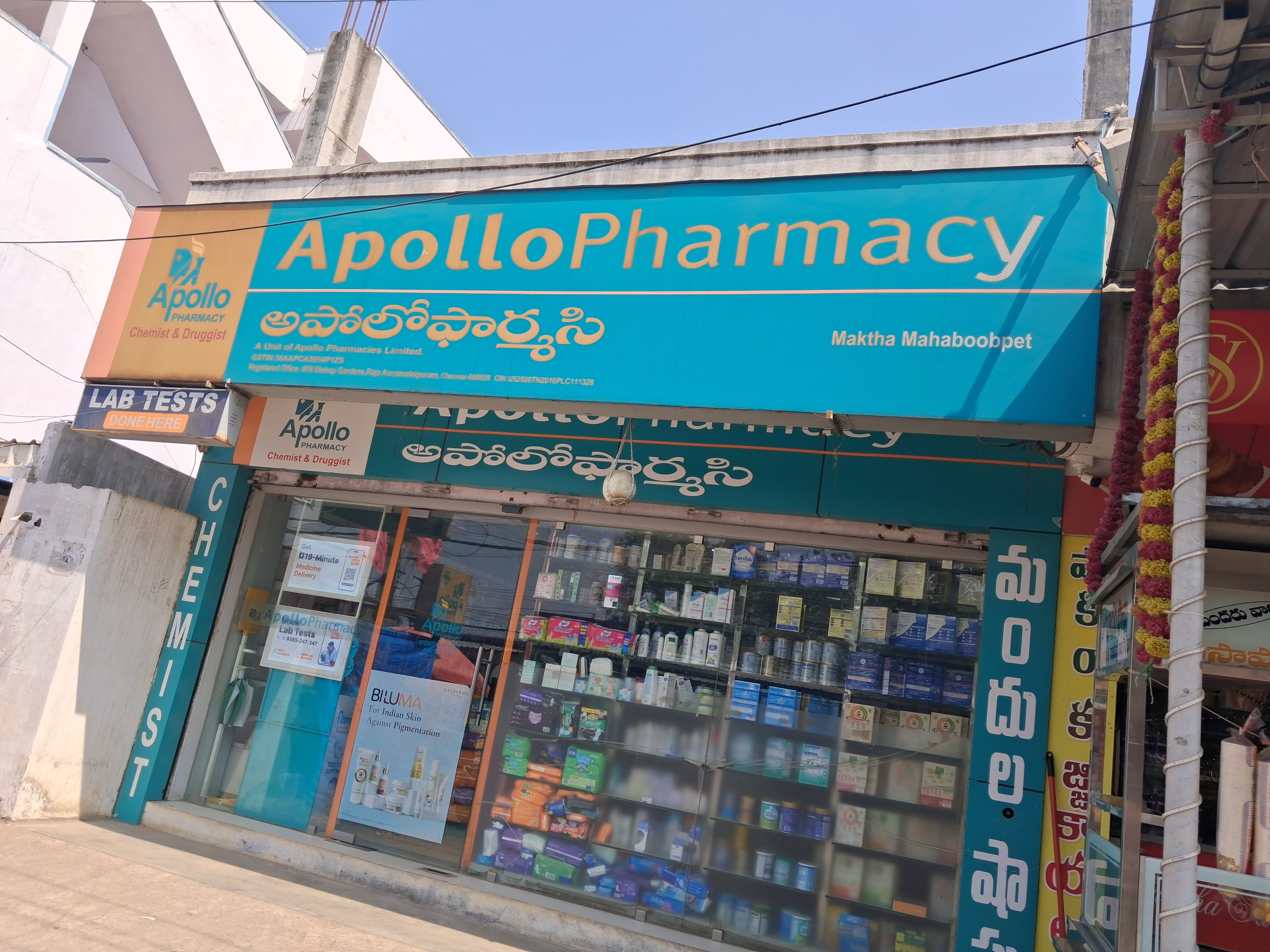
Apollo pharmacy maktha mahaboobpet

Some prominent hospitals in and around the area are:

- Pranaam Hospitals (Maternity), Mythri Nagar, Miyapur, Madeenaguda
- Lotus Hospitals for Women & Children, Jaya Prakash Narayan Nagar, Miyapur, Hyderabad, Telangana 500049
- Mirra Multispeciality Hospital, Alluri Seeta Rama Raju Colony, Jaya Prakash Narayan Nagar, Miyapur
- Sri Poly Clinic, Maktha Mahabubpet
- Vishu children clinic and Vaccination centre
- First Health Labs, beside BK Enclave

== Transportation ==
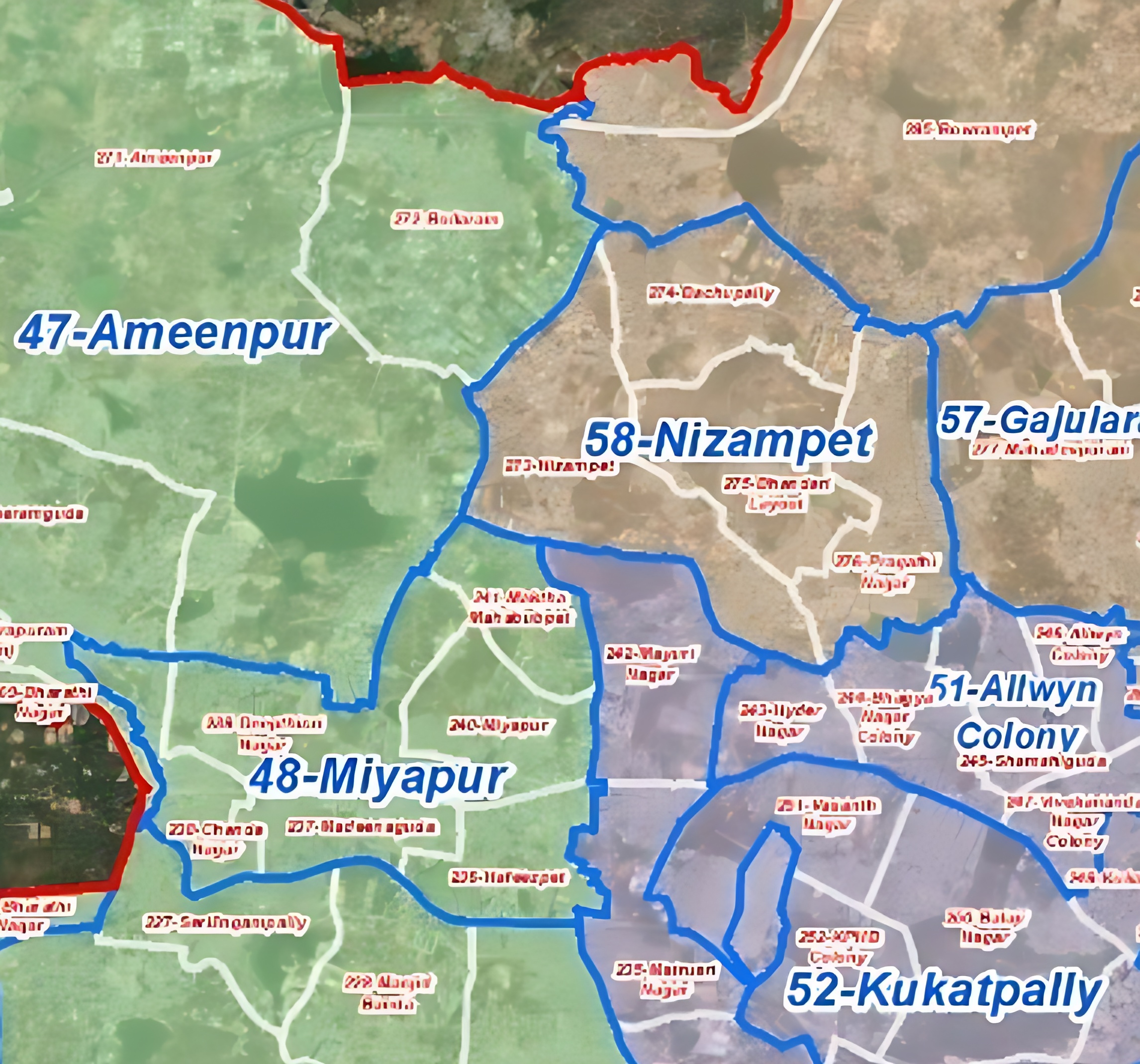
Miyapur Circle Map

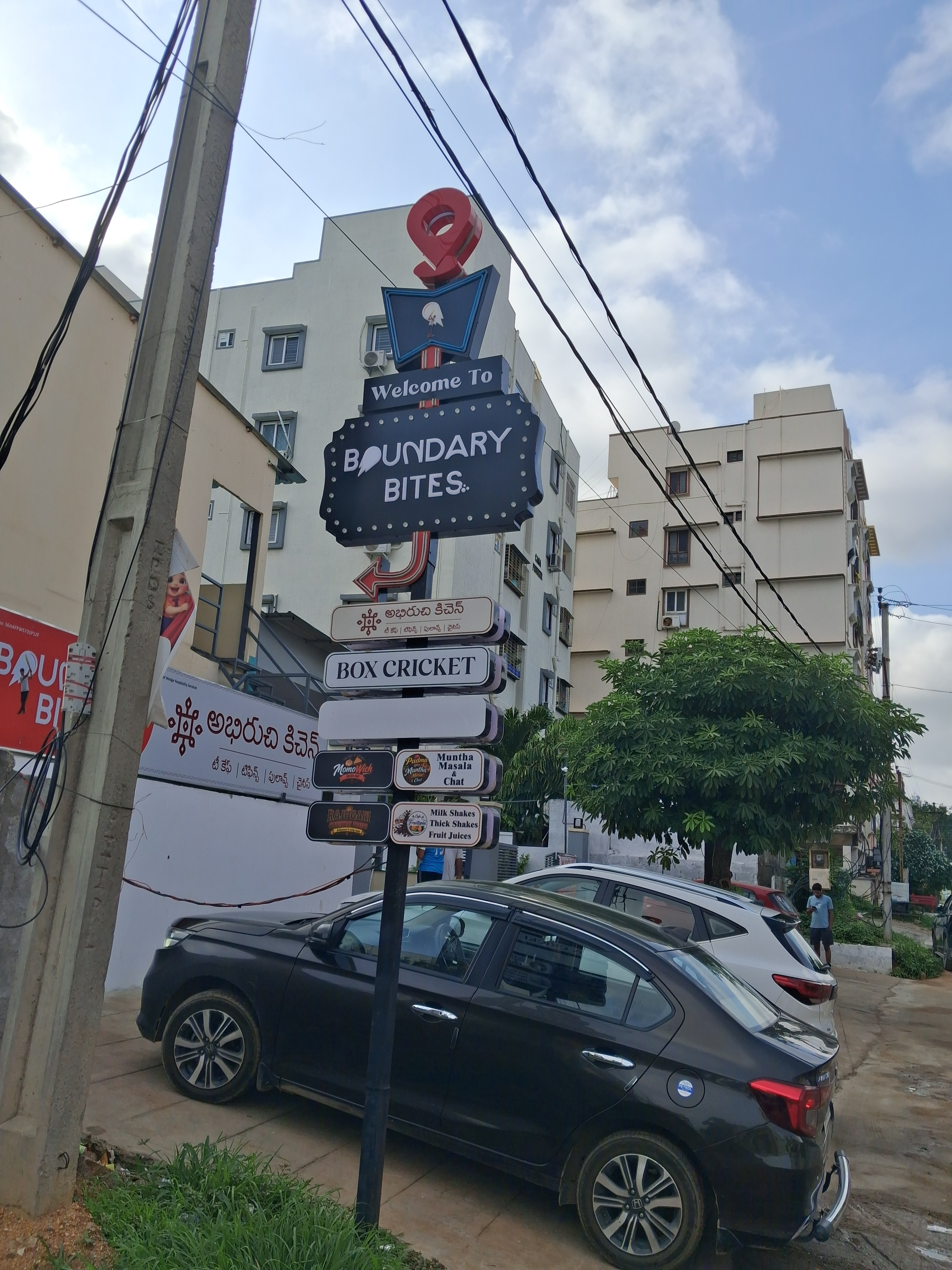
Boundary Bites Drivein maktha mahaboobpet

The locality is well-connected via road and rail. It lies along NH65, with intermediate ring roads linking to Gachibowli and Kompally. TSRTC operates bus services from Maktha Mahaboobpet to key destinations like Koti, Kondapur, Secunderabad (ISCIEL), Patancheru, and Uppal. The nearest MMTS (Multi-Modal Transport System) stations are Chandanagar and Hafeezpet, providing commuter rail links to Hyderabad's Secunderabad and Falaknuma junctions. The Miyapur metro station (Red Line) is approximately 4.8 - 5 km away, facilitating access to the city center. Future expansions under the Unified Metropolitan Transportation Authority (UMTA) are expected to enhance connectivity.

== Notable Events ==
In May 2024, GHMC demolished the boundary wall of Masjid-e-Habeeb Unnisa in Sai Jyothi Nagar, Maqta Mahboobpet, claiming it to be built on FTL of Pedda Kudi Cheruvu.

In August 2025, a tragic incident occurred where five members of a family were found deceased in a residence in Maktha Mahaboobpet Colony, prompting a police investigation by Miyapur authorities. The case, involving Uppari Lakshmaiah (60), his wife Uppari Venkatamma (55), and three others, highlighted community concerns over safety.

In December 2025, HYDRAA cleared illegal encroachments and reclaimed five acres (worth Rs 600 crore) of prime government land in Maktha Mahabubpet Survey No. 44. The land is part of a long-standing dispute between the state government and private parties, including developers like Janapriya Engineers Syndicate, concerning 51 acres alleged to be fraudulently transferred. Many properties in this survey have faced issues with registration due to 2013 collector notifications declaring it government land, leading to numerous court petitions seeking to register documents. Survey No. 44 has a total extent of 260.01 acres, all of which is classified as government land as per Sethwar village records, and this land is listed under Section 22-A of the Registration Act to prohibit private registrations.

In January 2026, HYDRAA cleared illegal encroachments and reclaimed 15 acres (worth Rs 3000 crore) of prime government land in Maktha Mahabubpet Survey No. 44.

In April 2026, a 26-year-old software engineer from Bihar, Ishika Singh allegedly died by suicide at her E-11 apartment in Jasmine Block, NSK Platina in Maktha Mahabubpet, Miyapur after being allegedly harassed by her husband, Neeraj Bansal for additional dowry and investing money in his start-up company, BeSpoke AI Stylist.
