= Miyapur =

- Neighbourhood
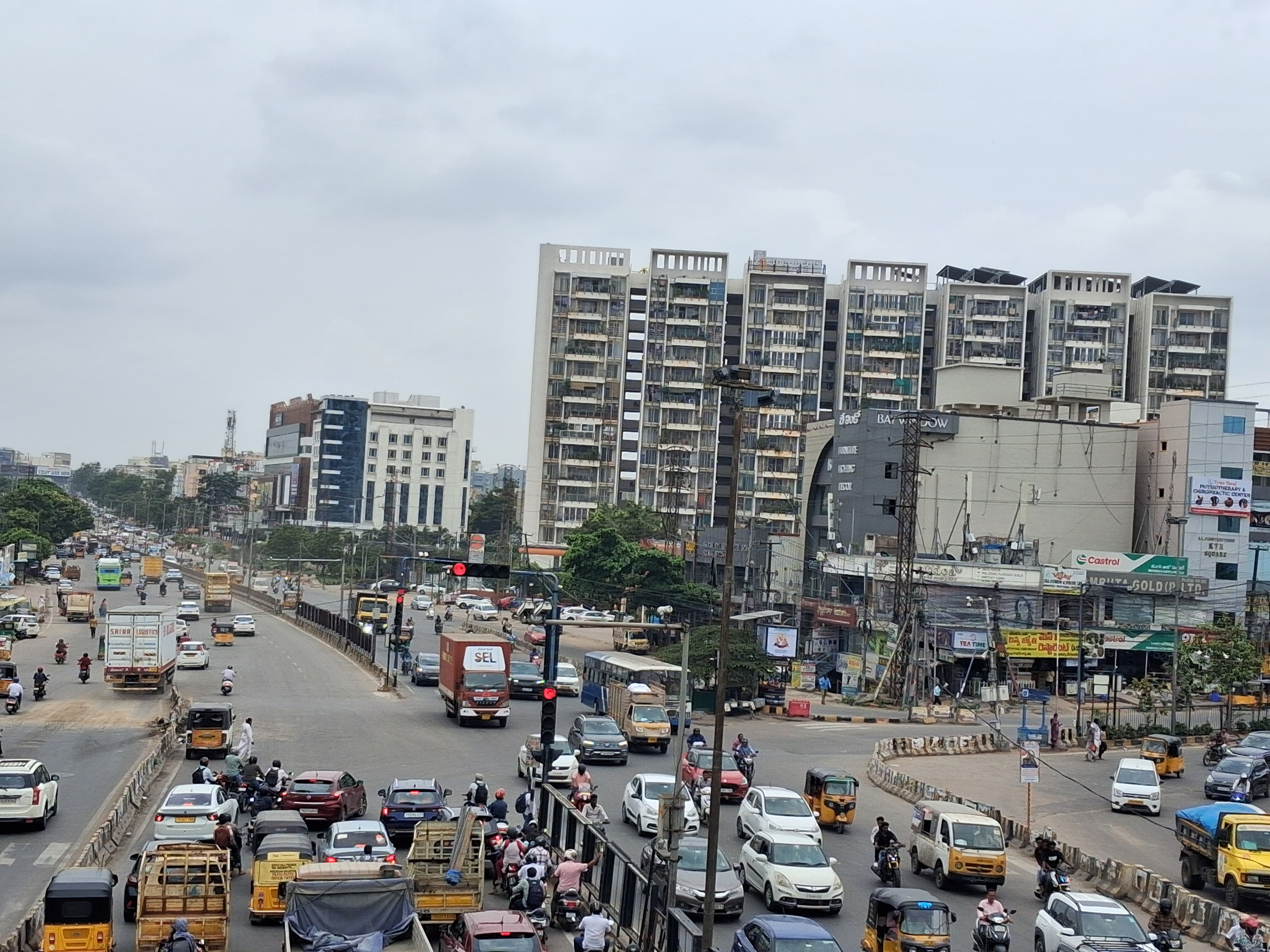
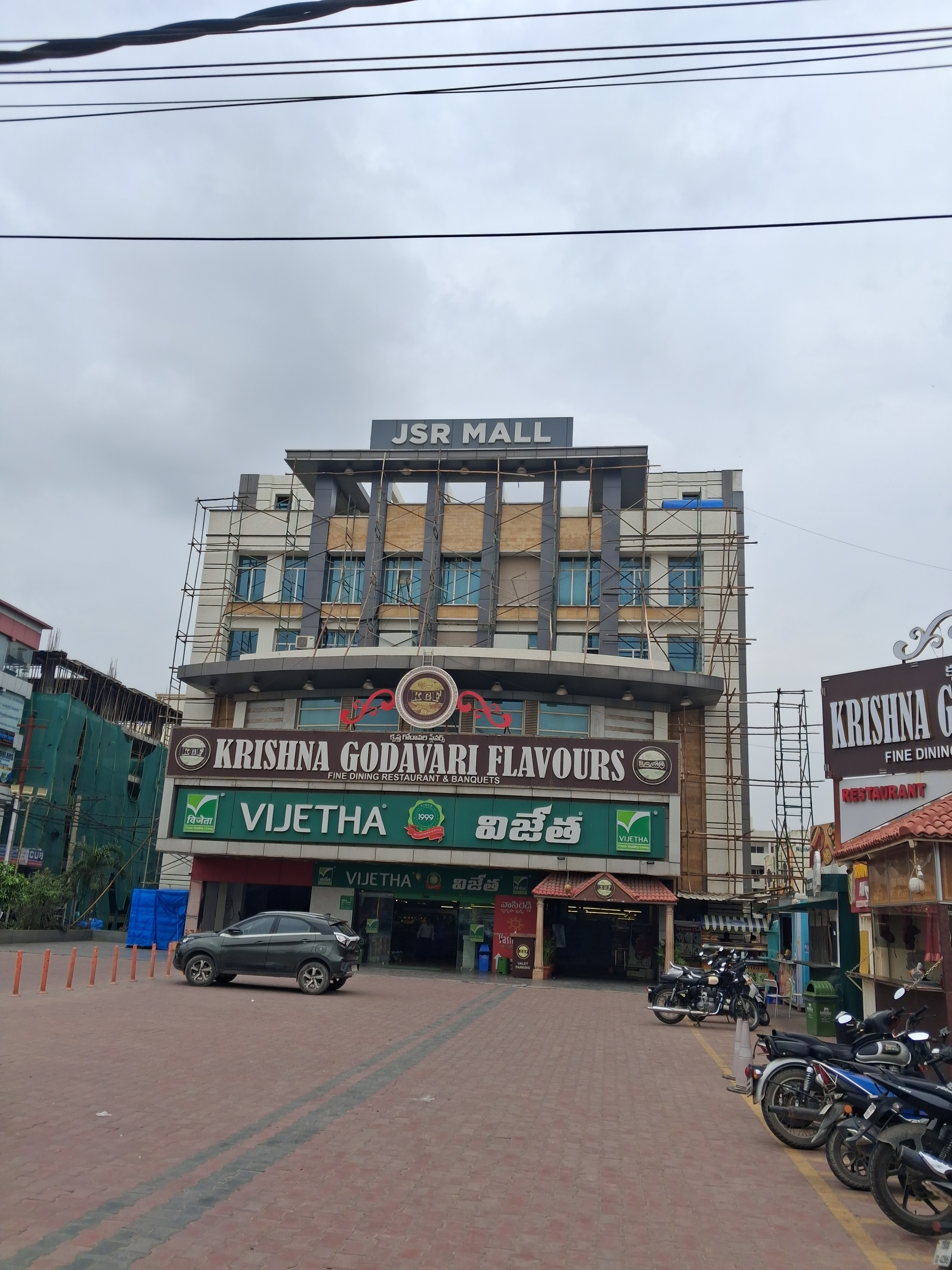
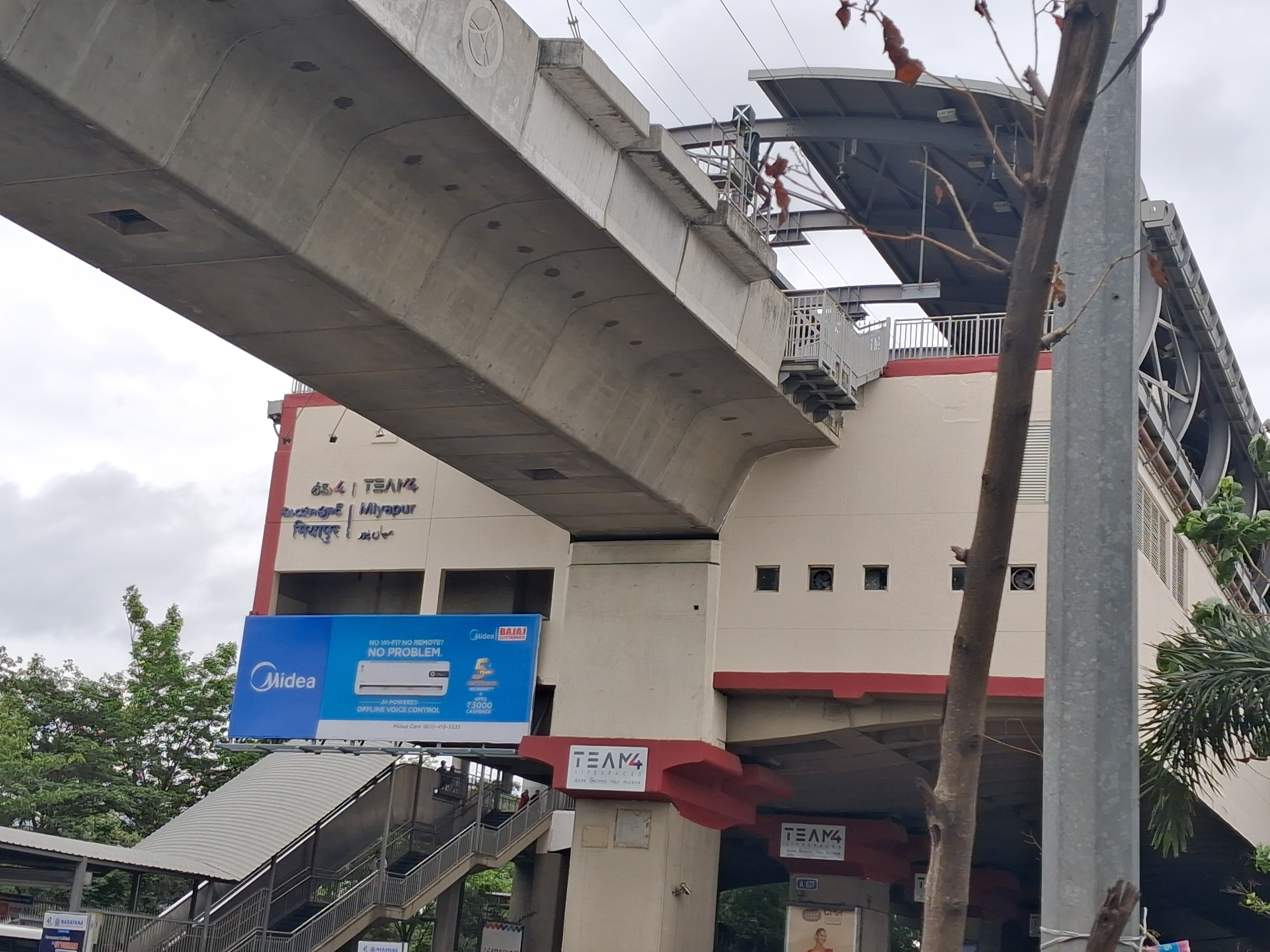
- Clockwise from top: Allywn Cross roads, GSM mall miyapur, Lotus hospital near bollarum road, Gurunatham Cheruvu miyapur, Jsr mall vijetha madeenaguda, Team4-miyapur metro station

- Miyapur, Hyderabad, Telangana, India Miyapur (Telangana) Miyapur (India)
- Coordinates: 17°31′0.882″N 78°20′35.668″E
- Country: India
- State: Telangana
- District: Ranga Reddy
- City: Hyderabad
- Revenue Division: Rajendranagar
- Revenue Mandal: Serilingampally (Mandal Code #6)
- GHMC Circle Wise Delimitation Election Ward: West Zone, Serilingampally (North), Circle-XII, Chanda Nagar, Ward-114, Miyapur Area-7
- Named for: Miya Patel
- Parliament Constituency: Chevella (Constituency #10)
- Sasana Sabha Constituencies: Serilingampally (Constituency #52)

Government
  - Type: Municipal Corporation
  - Body: CMC
  - MLA: Arekapudi Gandhi
  - Member of Parliament: Konda Vishweshwar Reddy
- Elevation: 536 m (1,759 ft)

Population (23 June 2009)
  - Total: 39,561
- In election ward 114
- Demonym: Miyapurite
- Time zone: UTC+5.30 (IST)
- Postal Index Number (PIN): 500049 – Miyapur PO
- +Country Code-Area Code: +91-40
- ISO 3166 code: IN-TG
- Vehicle registration: TG-07

Miyapur (/ˈmiːjɑːpʊər/ MEE-yah-poor), is a neighbourhood in the northwest Hyderabad in India, is part of Greater Hyderabad and administered by Cyberabad Municipal Corporation and developed by HMDA. It is located 10 kilometres (6.2 mi) from IT hub. Transportation is managed by UMTA. Miyapur has many lakes, and upscale residential apartments.

Miyapur is one of Hyderabad's busiest places at the head of the Miyapur – L.B. Nagar metro rail corridor. Industrial facilities include IT, pharmaceutical, apparel and industrial development areas. It is strategically located on NH65, the Pune-Hyderabad-Machilipatnam highway. Contributing to the growth are connectivity via the Miyapur-Gachibowli and Miyapur-Kompally intermediate ring roads, and developments like the Hyderabad Metro and ICBT.

== History ==
Miyapur, a Major village, close to Hyderabad, owes much of its ancient history, to the history of Hyderabad. Chalukyas, Kakatiyas, Bahmanis, Qutb Shahis, Mughals and Asaf Jahis ruled this region. It was often referred to as an extension of the Bachupally village.

Miyapur is now a part of Ranga Reddy (RR) district, previously known as 'Hyderabad (Rural)' district, which was formed on 15 August 1978, by carving out and deleting the twin cities of Hyderabad and Secunderabad, a few surrounding urban settlements that formed the urban core, of the erstwhile district of Hyderabad in the erstwhile Indian state of Hyderabad and renamed as Ranga Reddy district after the Late Sri K. V. Ranga Reddy, then deputy chief minister of erstwhile united Andhra Pradesh.

== Geography ==
Miyapur is located at the heart of the Deccan Plateau of the Indian subcontinent in South Asia with 17.4968°N 78.3614°E geo coordinates near Kukatpally. Minable minerals include quartz, felspar and limestone. Sand quarrying is also done.

Miyapur falls under the "tropical rainy climatic" group, more specifically a tropical wet and dry or savanna climate.

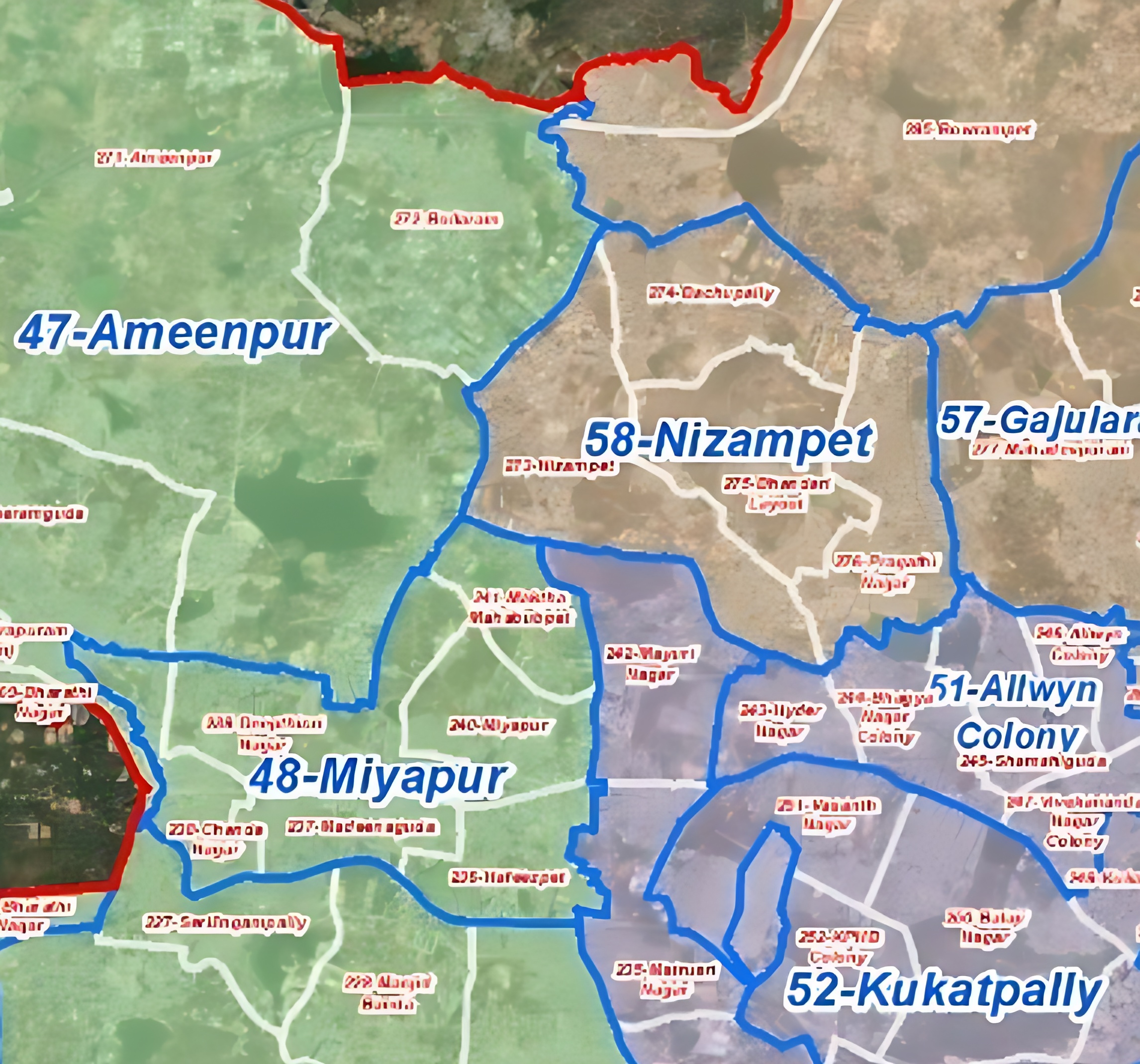
Miyapur Circle Map

- Miyapur is now part of Cyberabad Municipal Corporation.

== Etymology ==
The name Miyapur is said to derive from Miya Patel, the Patel of the region. The word Patel in this context refers to the village headman or land-holder in older times. So Miya Patel would have been a local person of significance. Miya-pur then would mean the settlement/town of Miya (or Miya-Patel). The suffix -pur (from Sanskrit pura meaning town/settlement) is common in many place-names.

== Economy ==
Agriculture was the predominant occupation, before the urbanization of Miyapur. The main crops were cotton, maize, sugar cane, ground nut, red gram etc. In addition Flori-culture, dairy, vegetable cultivation were being practiced by the farmers. Sand quarrying is also an occupation.

Miyapur has increasingly shifted towards an urban economy, with more residents working for large corporations and fewer relying on agriculture. Since 2021, the area has experienced a boom in high-rise construction and is now home to some of the tallest buildings in Hyderabad. Candeur 40 and Team4 Nyla are among the tallest buildings in the area.

== Landmarks ==
- Miyapur Cheruvu (Gurunatham Cheruvu)
- Pedda Kudi Cheruvu (Maktha Mahabubpet Lake)
- Patel Cheruvu
- Regulakunta lake (Deepthisri Nagar)
- Gangaram Cheruvu (Chanda Nagar)
- Hafeezpet Cheruvu
- Madeenaguda Cheruvu
- Kendriya Vihar
- Allwyn X-Roads
- Sri SeetaRamanjaneya Swamy Devastanamu (Ramalayam)
- Cavalry Temple Church
- ARK Towers
- SMR Vinay City (Narenn Estates)
- SMR Vinay Hilands

== Localities and neighbourhoods ==
- JP Nagar
- HUDA Mayuri Nagar
- Maktha Mahabubpet
- Matrusri Nagar, Miyapur, Hyderabad
- Deepthisri Nagar
- Prashanth Nagar
- DK Enclave
- Policemen Housing Society
- HMT Swarnapuri Colony
- Janapriya Nagar (JP Nagar)

== Tallest buildings in Miyapur ==
Buildings taller than 100 metres (328 ft) in Miyapur, it doesnt include buildings under 47-Ameenpur Circle
- Residential
- Commercial
1 Candeur Twins
2 Candeur 40
3 NYLA by Team4 Life Spaces
4 Vertex Viraat
5 ARIA by Team4 LifeSpaces
6 Indis Sia Prospera
7 Primark Inspira

This lists ranks the tallest completed and topped out buildings in Miyapur, it doesnt include buildings under 47-Ameenpur Circle. It includes high-rise buildings that are at least 100 metres (328 ft) in height based on standard height measurements.

Was the tallest building in Miyapur upon completion
Architecturally topped out but not yet completed

Rank	Name	Location	Image	Height	Floors	Year	Building type	Notes
-	ARIA by Team4 LifeSpaces	Miyapur-Bollaram Road 17°30′33.6″N 78°21′45.0″E		181.8 metres (596 ft)	55 floors * 7 Towers	2031	Residential	
1	Candeur Twins	Miyapur-Bollaram Road 17°30′27.5″N 78°21′43.2″E		141 metres (463 ft)	47	2027	Residential	
2	Candeur40	Miyapur-Bollaram Road 17°30′16.3″N 78°21′47.8″E	Tall residential building complex with three towers.	118.59 metres (389 ft)	40	2026	Residential	
3	NYLA by Team4 Life Spaces	Miyapur-Bollaram Road 17°30′31.0″N 78°21′41.2″E		112 metres (367 ft)	35	2027	Residential	
4	Vertex Viraat	Miyapur-Bollaram Road 17°30′05.1″N 78°21′49.3″E		105 metres (344 ft)	32	2027	Residential	

== Gallery ==
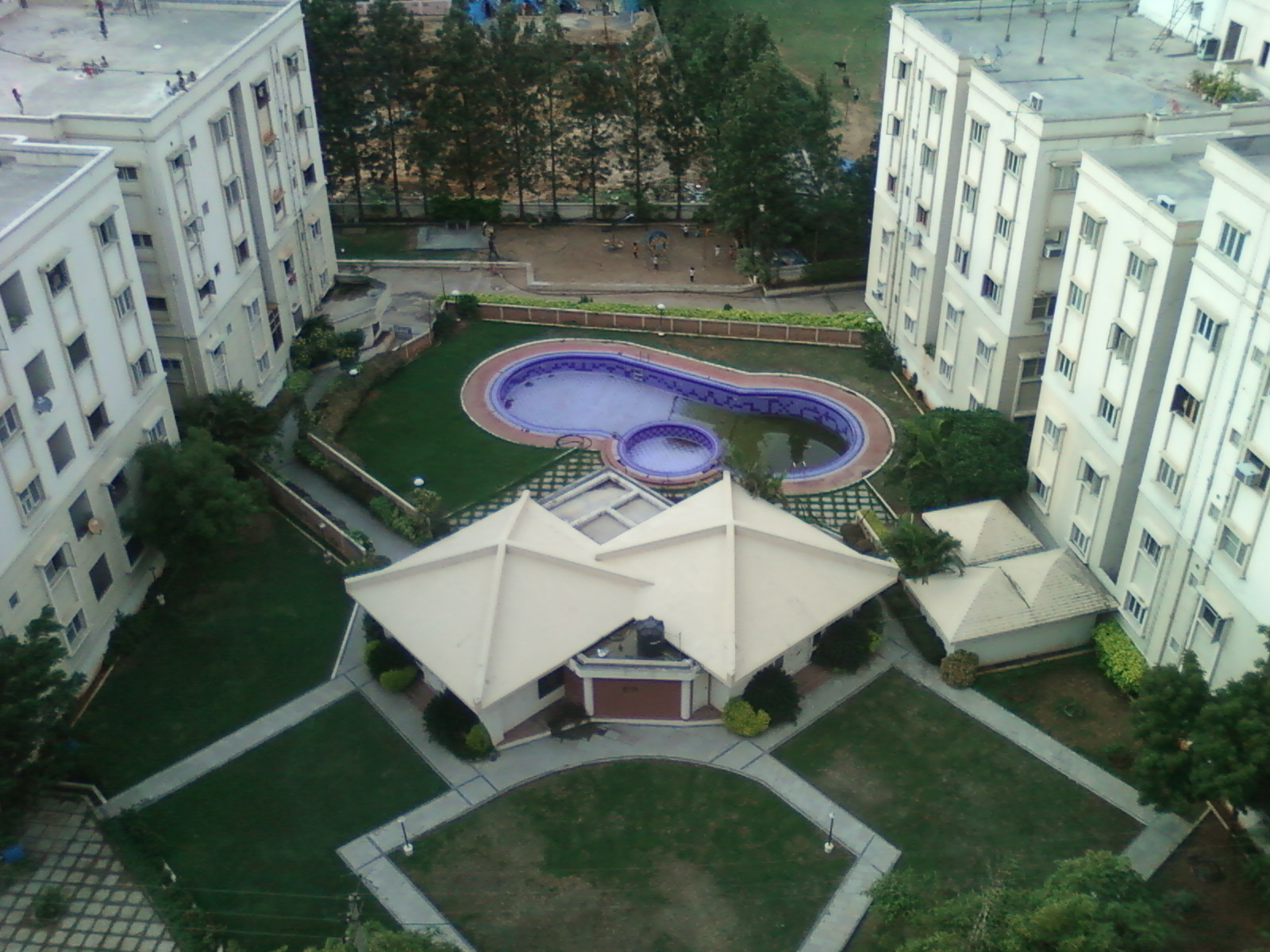
An Apartment park area in Miyapur, Hyderabad

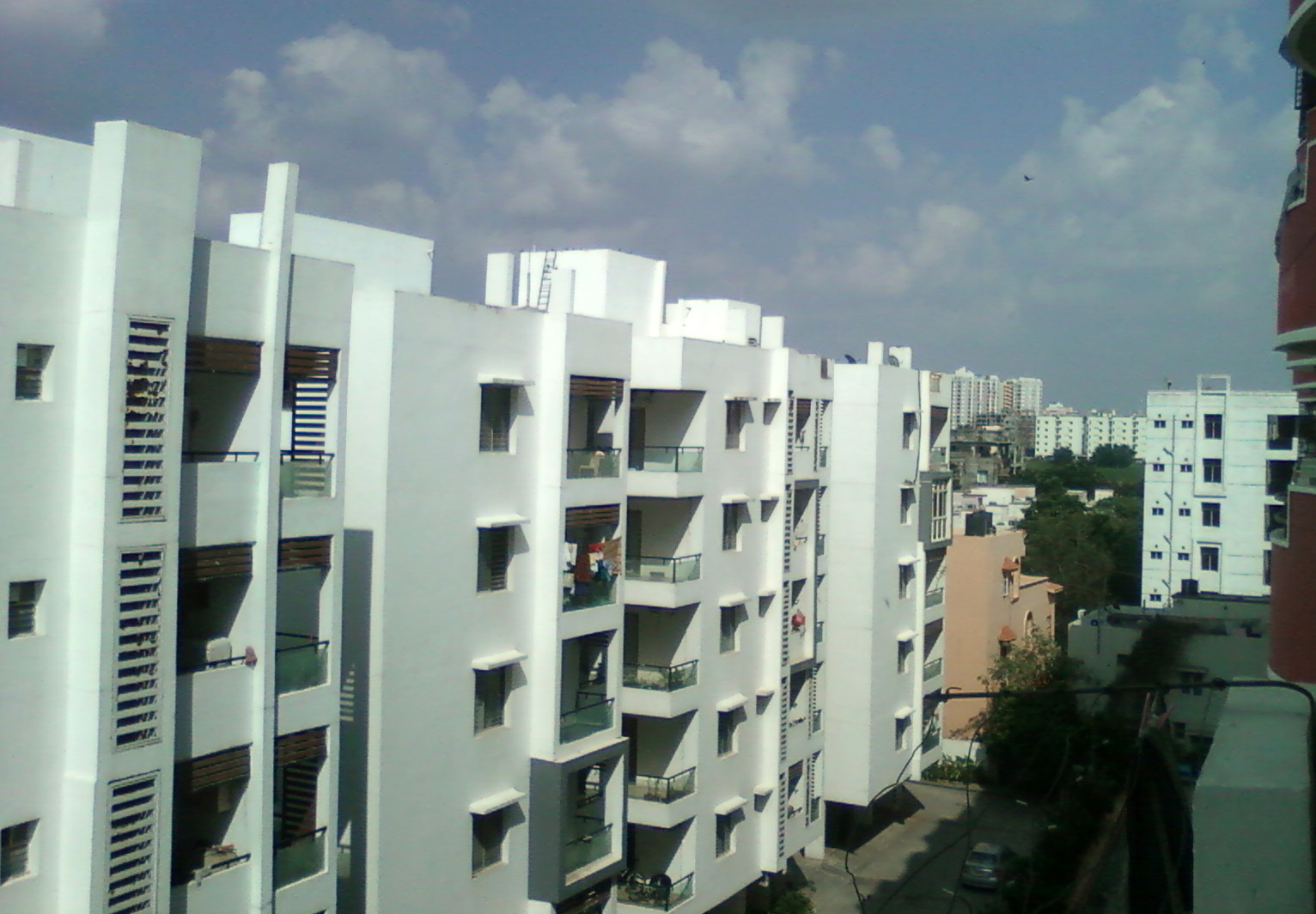
View of Apartments at Miyapur, Hyderabad

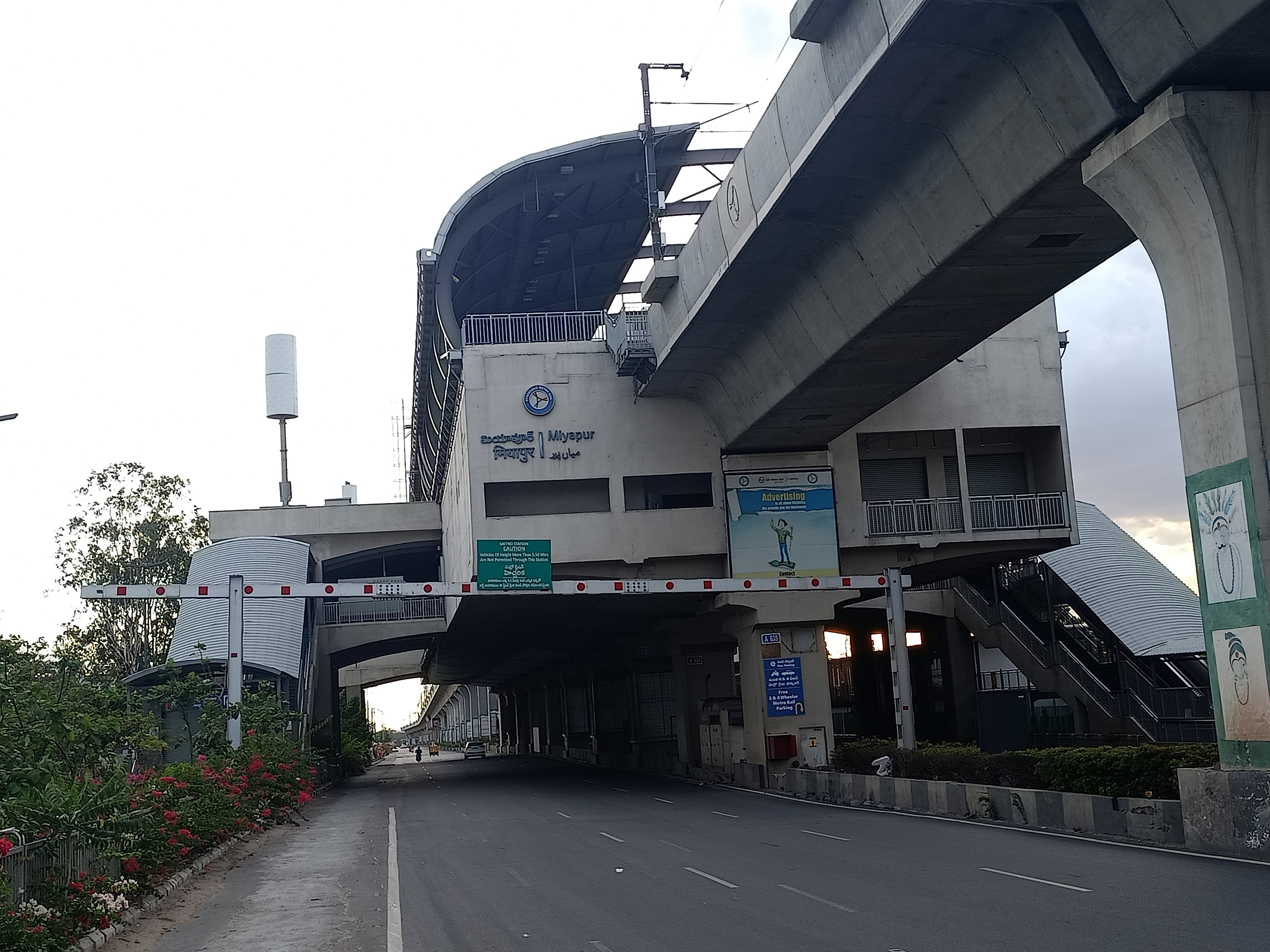
Miyapur Metro Station, Hyderabad

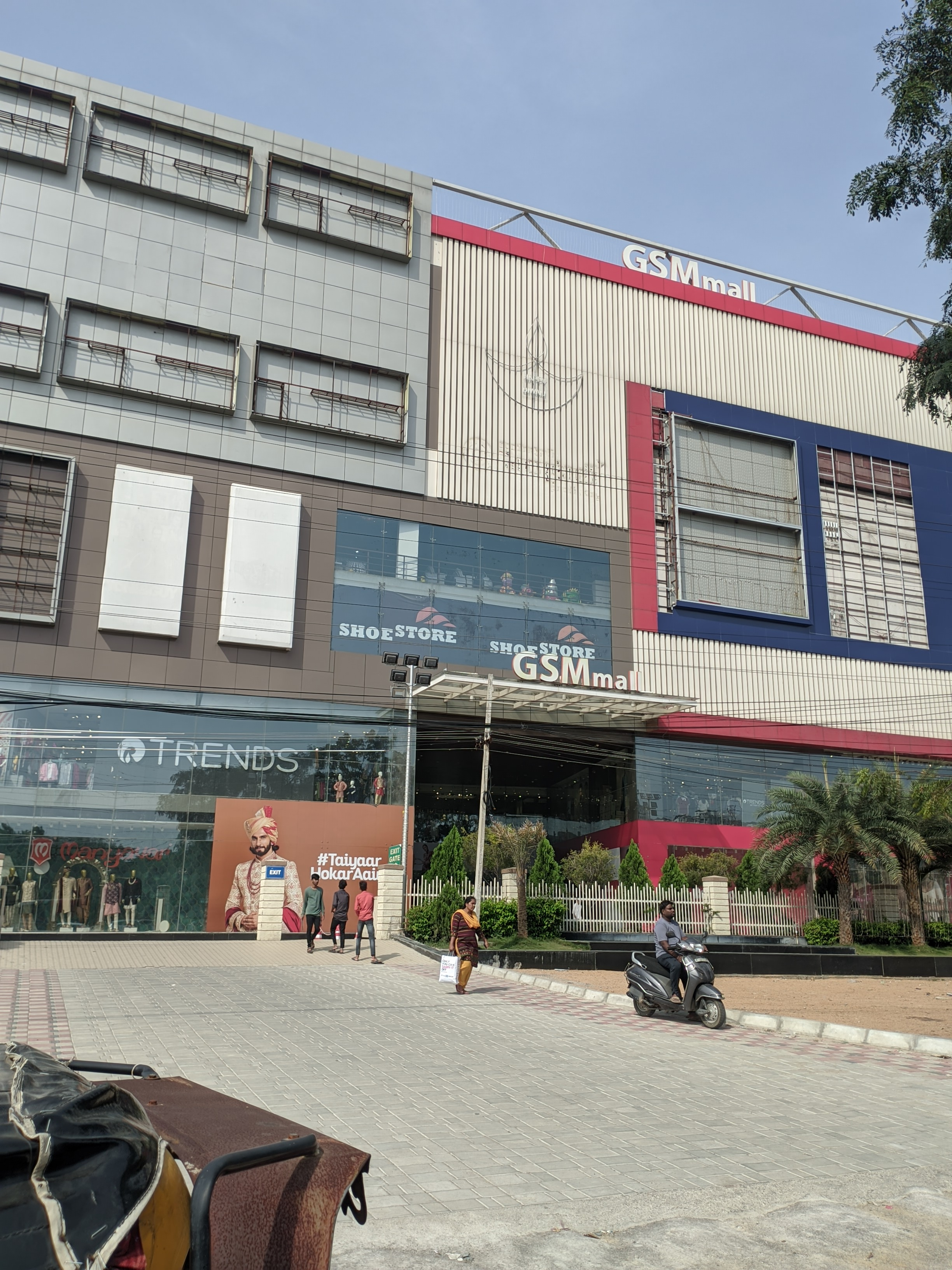
GSM Mall & Multiplex, Miyapur

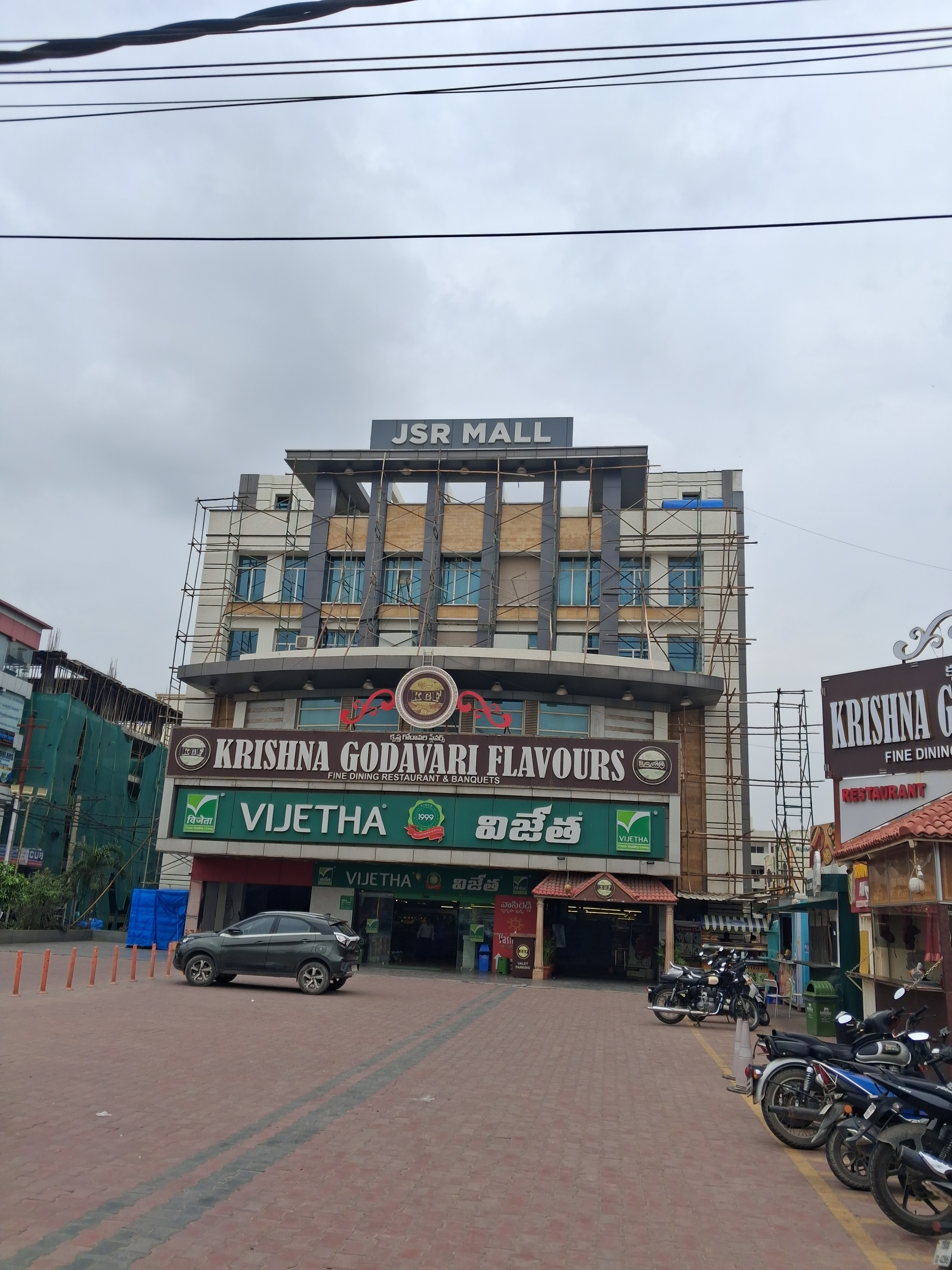
Jsr mall

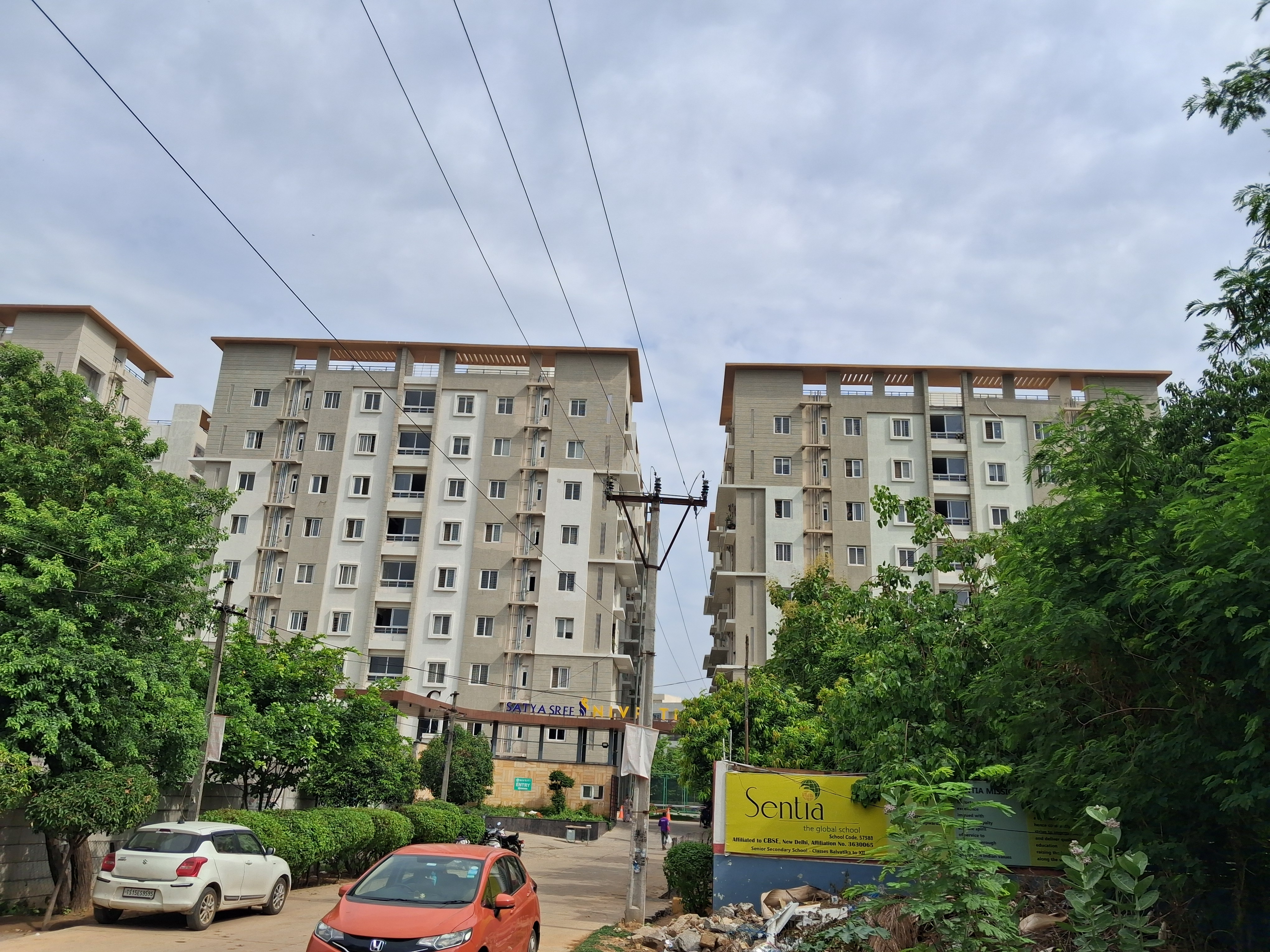
Satya sree nivriti homes bk enclave, Maktha Mahabubpet, Miyapur.

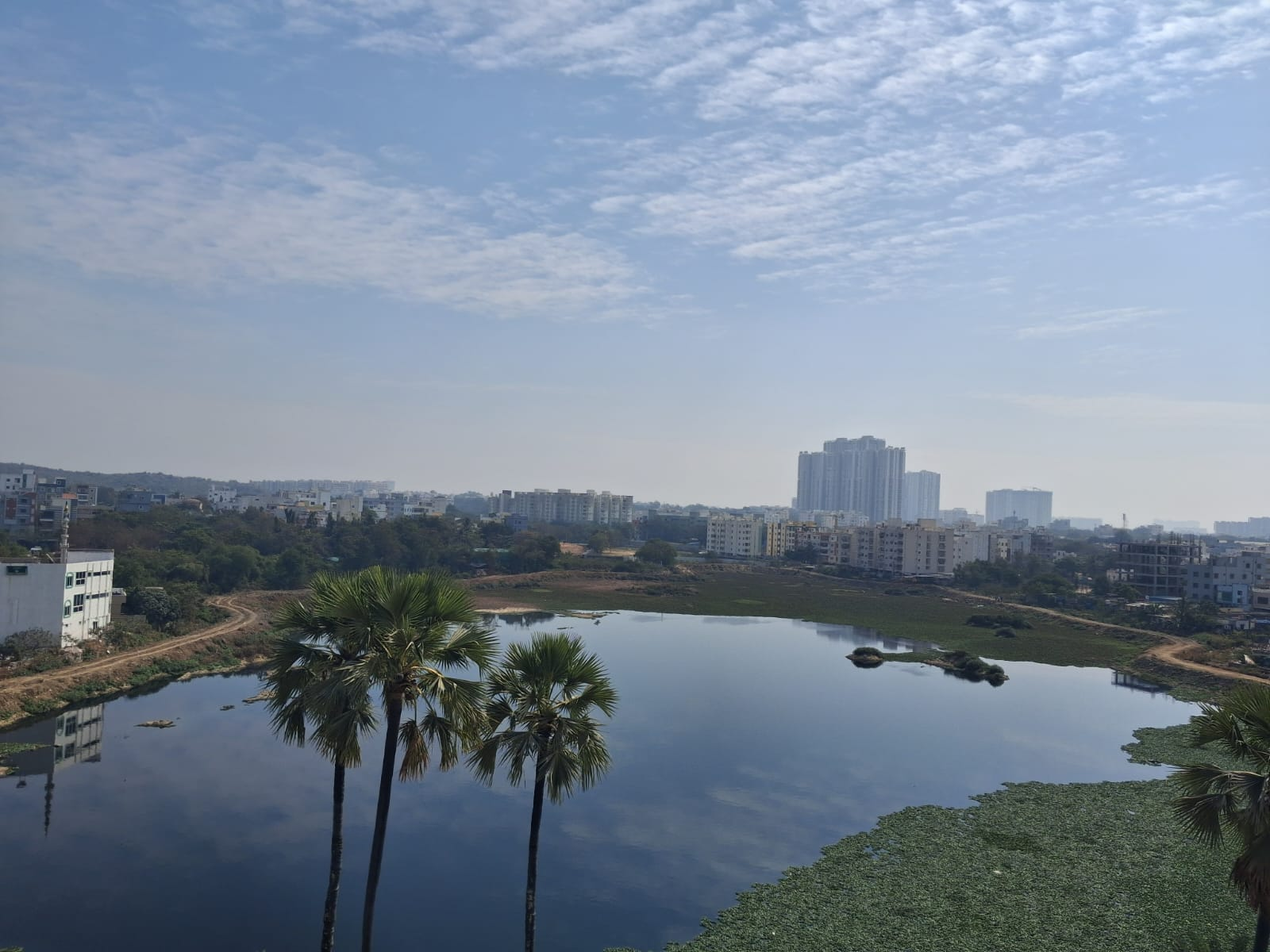
Maktha Mahabubpet Pedda Kudi Cheruvu.

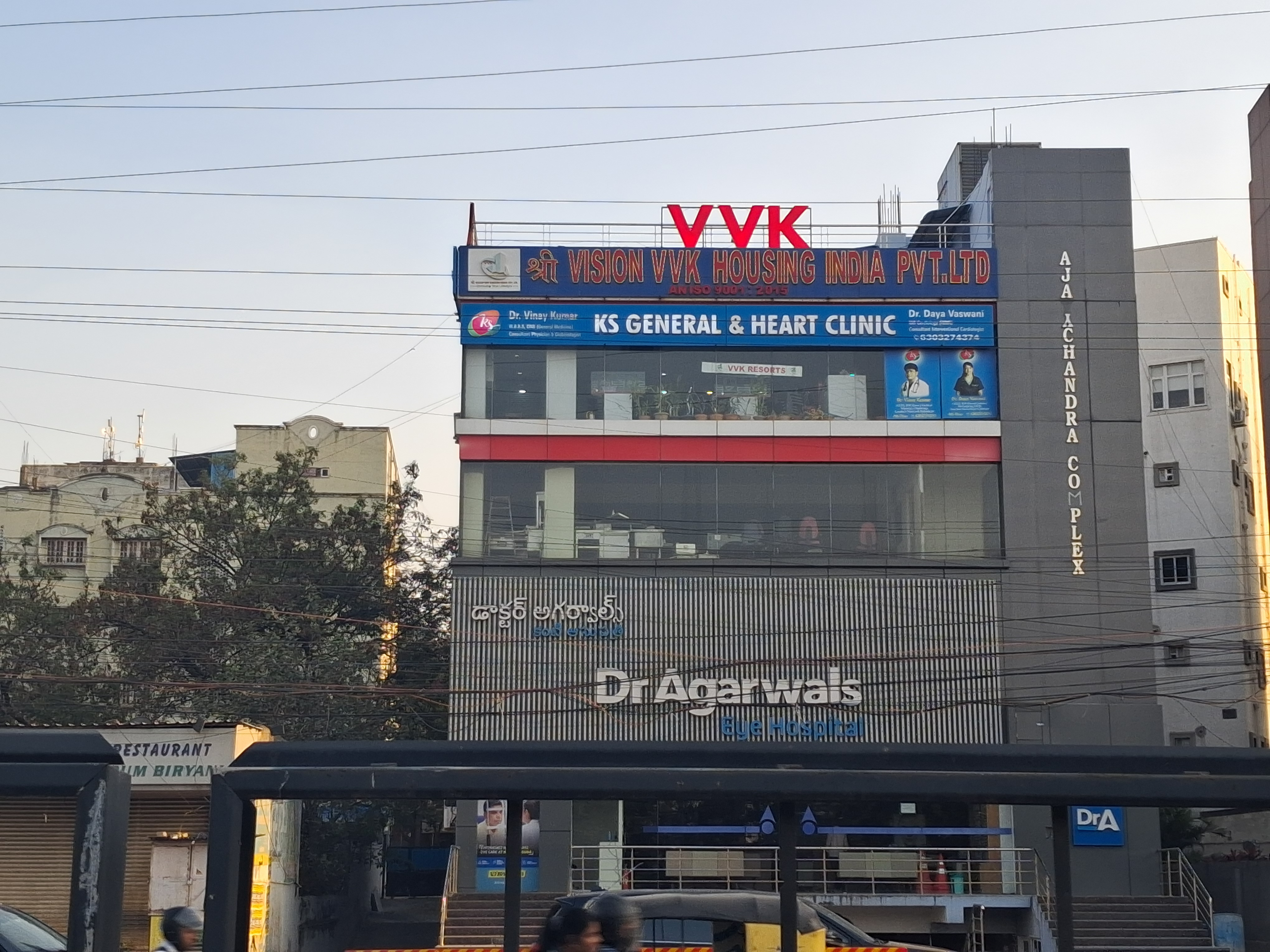
Dr Agarwals Eye Hospital Allwyn x signal Miyapur Hyderabad.

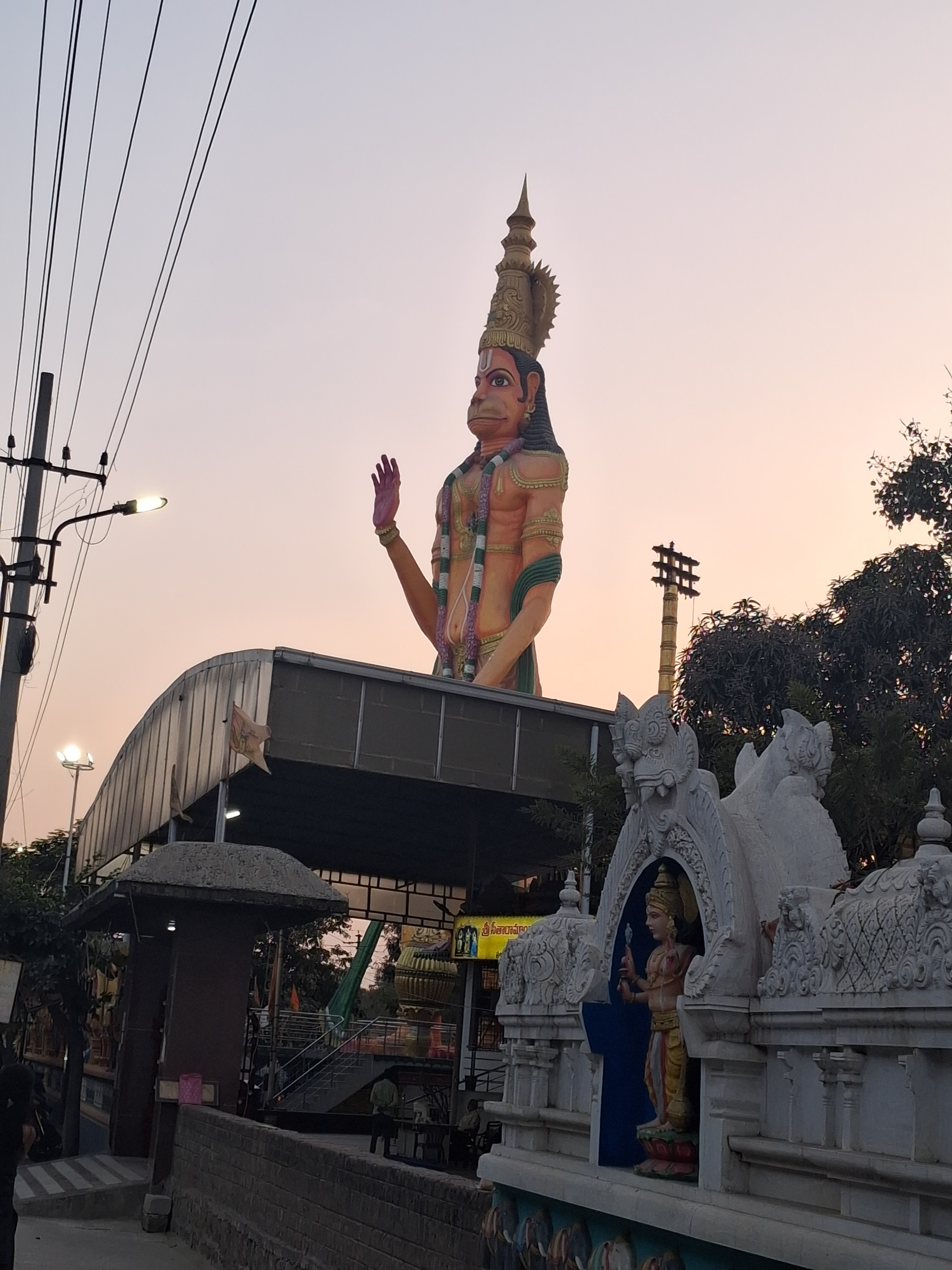
Sri SeetaRamanjaneya Swamy Devastanamu (Ramalayam) Miyapur.

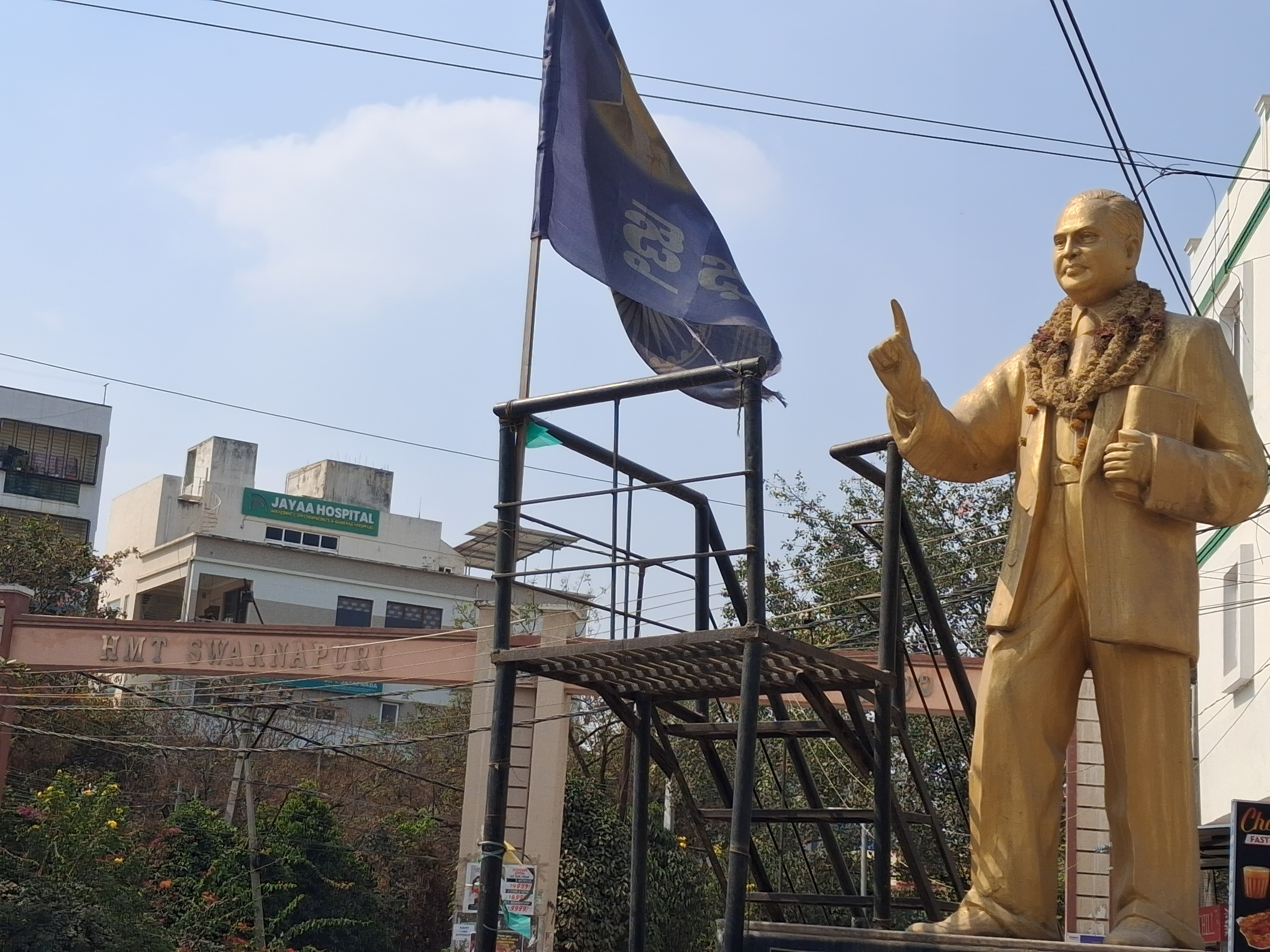
HMT Swaranapuri Colony Maktha Mahabubpet Miyapur Hyderabad.

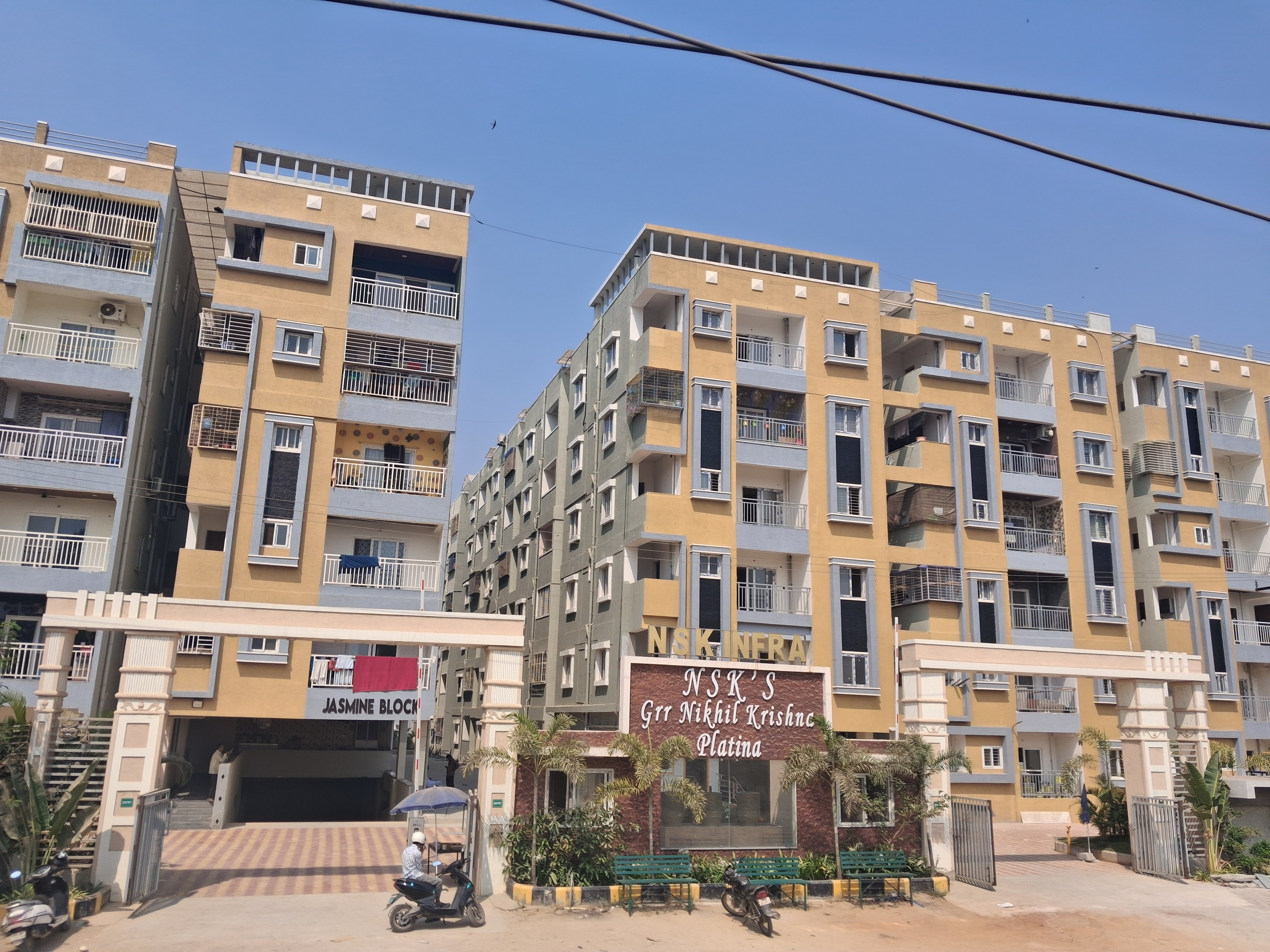
NSK Platina Gated Maktha Mahabubpet, Miyapur.

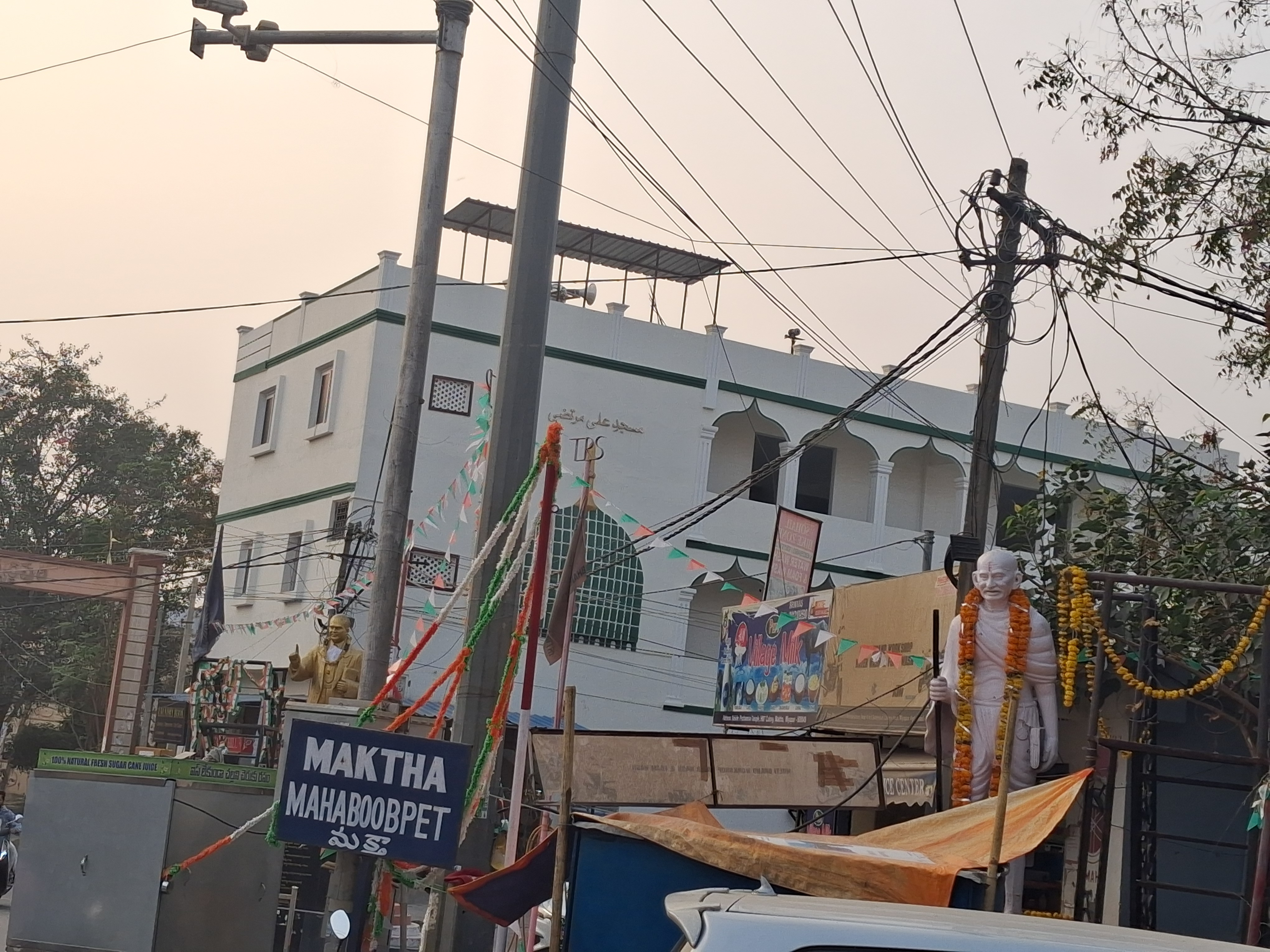
Maktha Mahabubpet full chowk view.

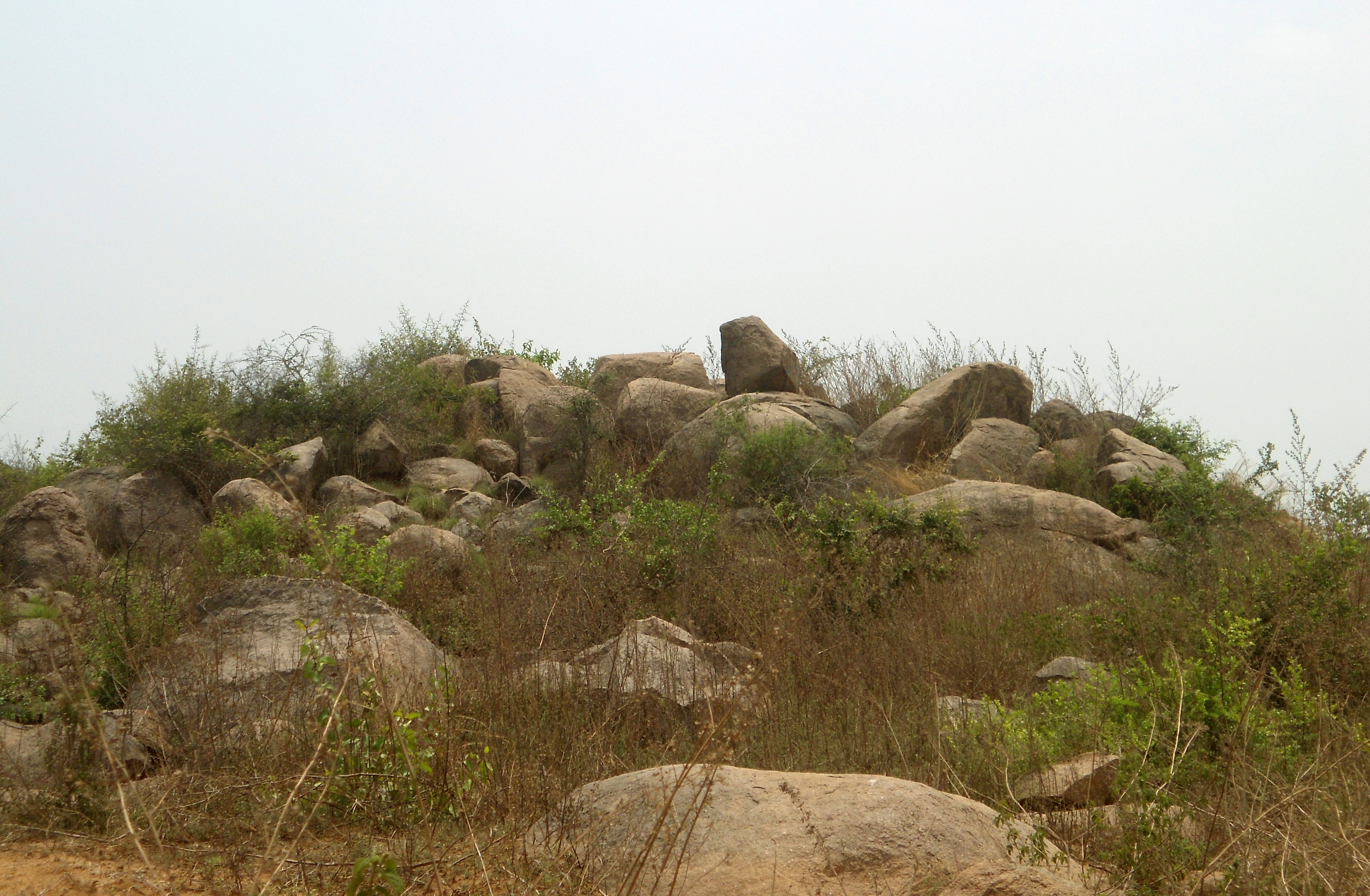
Rock formations at Miyapur.

== Demographics ==
Miyapur population
Total Population	39,561
Demonym	Miyapurite
Languages	Telugu, Urdu, Hindi
Governing Body	CMC

== Miyapur concerns ==
=== Issues ===
- Lakes
  - Encroachment
  - Patel Cheruvu Trouble
  - Pharma-pollution
- Fire stations
  - Cyberabad fire station to be beefed up
  - Fire stations, firemen and equipment is inadequate
  - Most buildings in Hyderabad are potential tinder boxes
- Environment
  - Air, water, noise and radiation pollution in Indian cities is a cause of great concern and Miyapur is no exception and the worst part is no one knows which are the culprit industries the polluting industries have been extremely clandestine in their polluting activities.
  - Miyapur turns into a virtual gas chamber
  - Trace Element Contamination in Ground Waters of Miyapur and Bollaram, Hyderabad, Telangana, India
  - Groundwater Quality Assessment of Miyapur Area in Ranga Reddy District, Telangana, India
  - Andhra Pradesh Pollution Control Board (APPCB) report.
  - Hyderabad on BARC’s radiation radar
  - Trees are reducing in great numbers.
  - Depleting ground water table
  - Polluting industries
    - 33 pharmaceutical-drug units, some of which include reputed companies like, Dr Reddy's Laboratory, Aurobindo Pharma, which have units in and around Miyapur.
- Quality of Roads
  - Lack of storm water drains
  - Bottlenecks
  - Overflowing drains and water logging
  - Open manholes : Death traps
  - Sudden troughs, uneven and bumpy road surface : Damage vehicles and causes back pains
  - Traffic congestion
  - No signboards or even barricades to warn motorists
- Land Grabbing
  - Disputed land survey number 78, Hafeezpet village at Serilingampally mandal.
  - Govt is reclaiming usurped land in Hyderabad. In Miyapur the disputed land survey numbers are 70, 44, 214.

=== Remedial measures ===
- The government, corporates and social workers have been doing a great job by playing an active role in the development of surrounding communities and pollution control.
- Erstwhile united Andhra government order to shift polluting industries from Hyderabad
- Arun Krishnamurthy, The man who's cleaning up India's dirty lakes
- Enforcing Road Sense

== Infrastructure ==
=== Roads ===
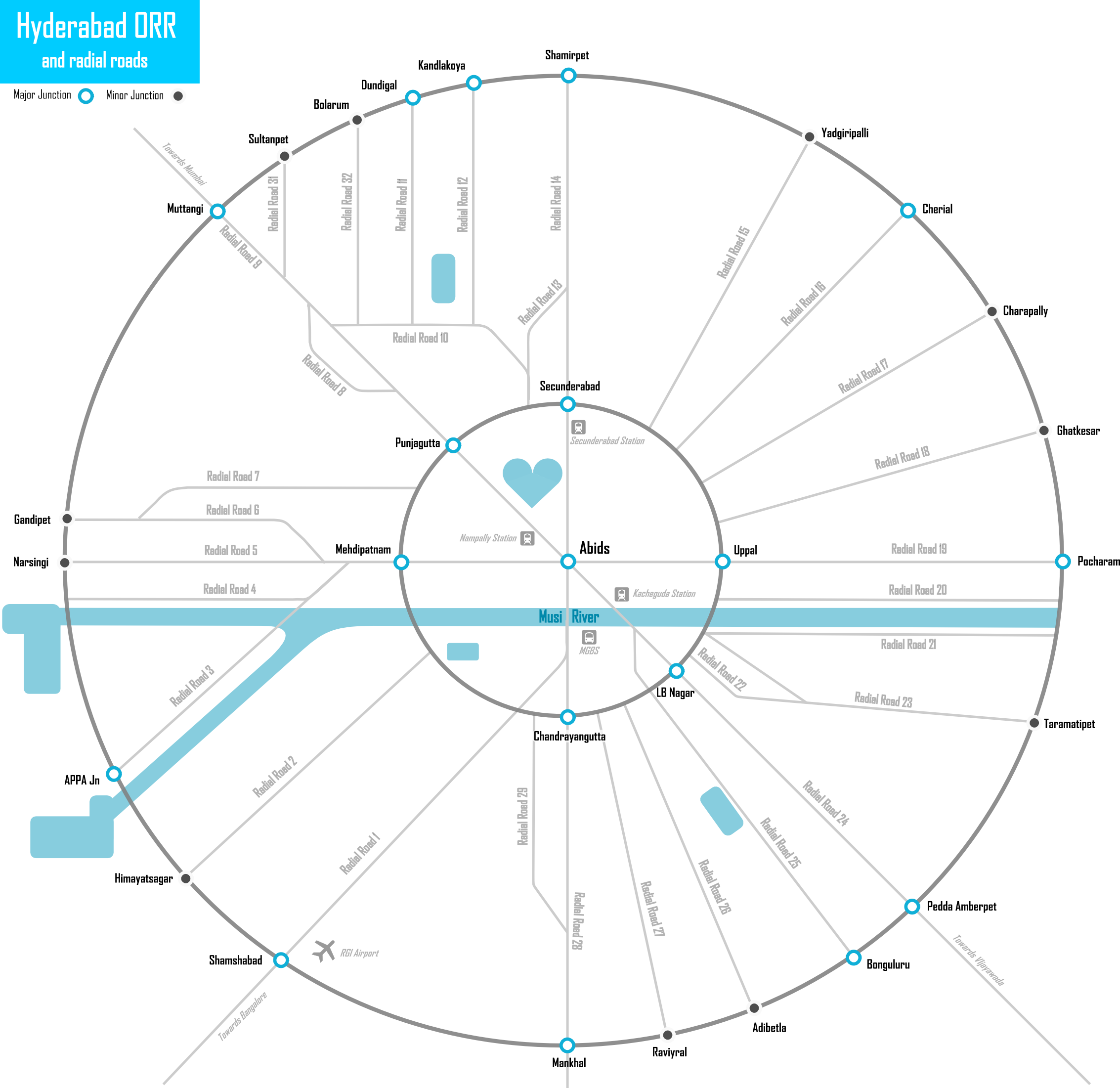
The Hyderabad Radial Roads

- Flyover and underpasses
  - 1.79-kilometer 6-lane bi-directional flyover from Miyapur X roads to Alwyn X roads
  - 3-lane uni-directional underpass from Alwyn X roads to Hafeezpet.
  - 3-lane from Bachupally to Miyapur X roads.
- Inter City Bus Terminal (ICBT), Survey Number 20, Miyapur (upcoming)
- Indian National Highways (NH)
  - NH65, the Pune – Hyderabad – Suryapet – Vijayawada – Machilipatnam highway passes through Miyapur
  - National Highway 44 (India), the Varanasi-Nagpur-Hyderabad – Bangalore – Kanyakumari highway is connected to National Highway 65 (India) via the Inner Ring Road, Hyderabad
- Intermediate Ring Roads (IMRR)
  - IMRR 2 : Miyapur – Gachibowli
  - IMRR 3 : Miyapur – Kompally
- Radial Roads (RR)
  - RR 9 : Miyapur – Kukatpally road (also known as National Highway 65 (India)
- Other Major Roads
  - Miyapur – Yellamma Banda (near Ambir Cheruvu) road (upcoming).
  - Miyapur – Hafeezpet road (upcoming, see HMDA masterplan 2031)
- Inner Ring Road
  - Nearest point : East : Punjagutta
- PVNR Elevated Expressway
  - Nearest point : Southeast : Mehdipatnam
- Nehru Outer Ring Road
  - Nearest point : North : Nehru-ORR, Exit 5, Dundigal, Medchal-Malkajgiri district
  - Nearest point : West : Nehru-ORR, Exit 3, Muthangi(Patancheru), Sangareddy District
  - Nearest point : South : Nehru-ORR, Exit 19, Narsingi,Ranga Reddy district
- Regional Ring Road
- Telangana State Highways (TSSH)

=== Rail ===
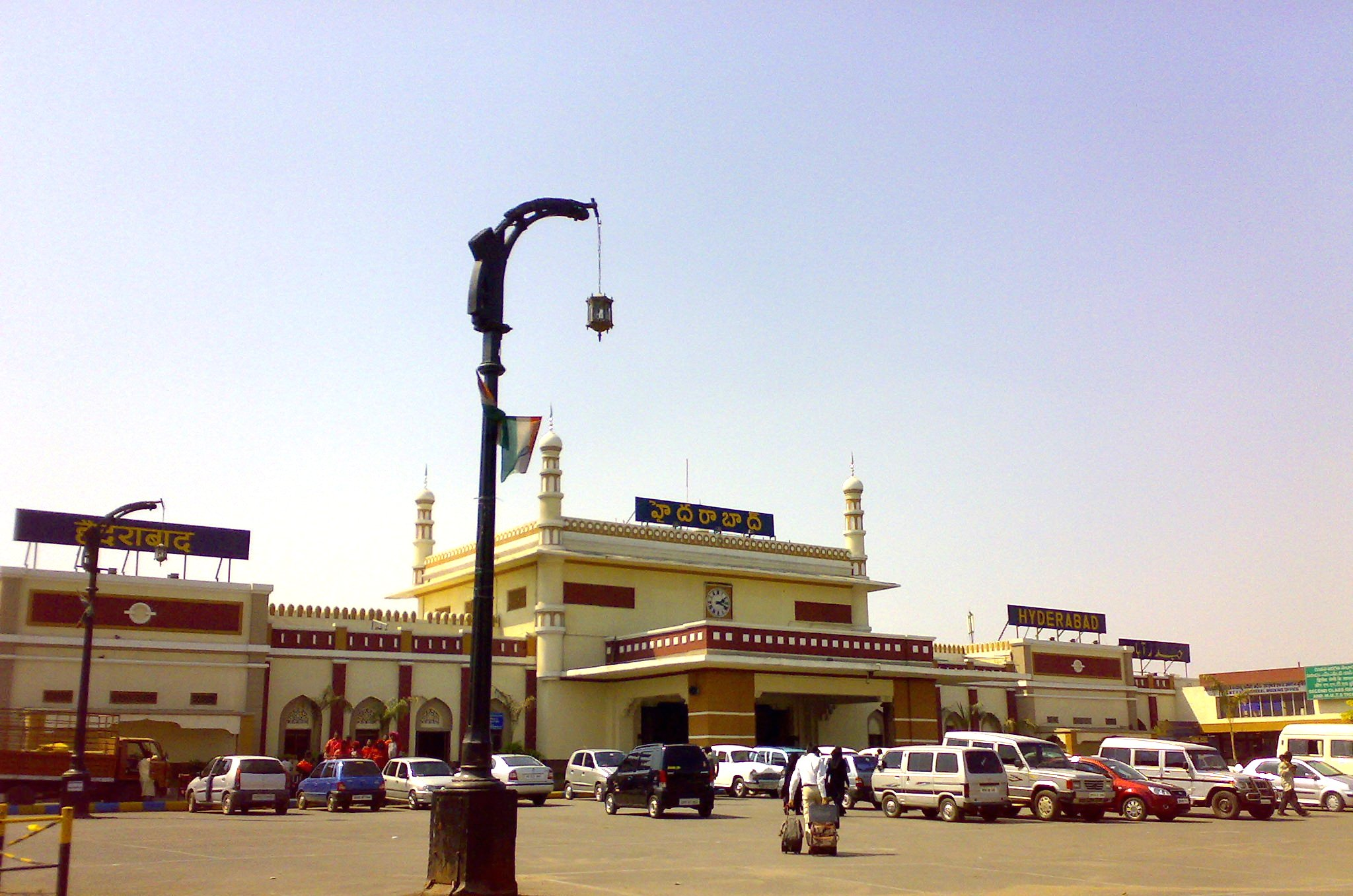
Indian Railways, Hyderabad Deccan (HYB) Station

- Hyderabad Metro Rail (HMR)
  - Miyapur metro station
  - Miyapur Depot-I
- Indian Railways
  - City Rail – Multi-Modal Transport System (MMTS)
    - Hafeezpet (HFZ) station is 2 kilometres (1.2 mi) south of Miyapur.
  - Long Distance Rail – South Central Railway zone
    - Hyderabad Deccan Nampally (HYB) station is 22.5 kilometres (14.0 mi) southeast of Miyapur.
    - Secunderabad (SC) station is 21.5 kilometres (13.4 mi) east of Miyapur.
    - Hyderabad Kacheguda (KCG) station is 24.5 kilometres (15.2 mi) southeast of Miyapur.

=== Air ===
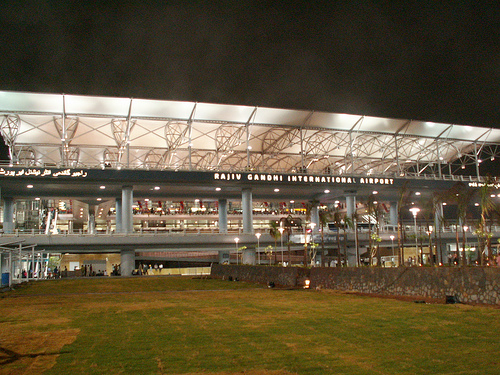
RGIA

- Airports
  - Rajiv Gandhi International Airport (IATA: HYD, ICAO: VOHS) is approximately 40 kilometres (25 mi) south of Miyapur.
  - Begumpet Airport (IATA: BPM, ICAO: VOHY) is a joint civil and military airport. The biennial Wings India is held here. It is approximately 15 kilometres (9.3 mi) southeast of Miyapur.

== Development projects ==
- Upcoming Projects
  - ICBT
  - Transit Oriented Development (TOD)
  - Master plan for Hyderabad Metro Rail expansion
  - Parks
    - Biodiversity park, Mayuri Nagar, Miyapur.
    - GHMC Memory Garden park, first exclusive multi-generation park at Mayuri Nagar in 3.5 acres of land area.
  - Fire Stations
    - Fire Station, HMR Depot-I, Miyapur
    - Fire Station, ICBT, Miyapur
- On-Hold Projects
  - Hyderabad BRTS – Seems to be a non-starter. Maybe this should be converted to an overhead metro rail.
  - AI-Based Pharma Healthcare IT Hub: At the 73rd Indian Pharmaceutical Congress, D. Sridhar Babu, Minister for IT along with Deputy Chief Minister, Mallu Bhatti Vikramarka and Pulsus Group CEO Gedela Srinubabu, announced the creation of an AI-based pharma healthcare IT hub. This initiative aims to develop AI-based skills and generate 10,000 direct jobs and 40,000 indirect jobs in Telangana.

== See also ==
- Bachupally
- Kukatpally
- Nizampet
- Transport in Hyderabad
- Hyderabad Metro Rail
- Hyderabad Multi-Modal Transport System
- Education in Hyderabad
- C. Earl Stubbs
