= Intercity Bus Terminal =

An intercity bus terminal is a structure where intercity buses stop to pick up and drop off passengers.

Intercity Bus Terminal may refer to:

- Inter City Bus Terminal (Hyderabad, India)
- Inter-City Bus Terminal (Reading, Pennsylvania)
- Intercity Bus Terminal Station a.k.a. Sangbong station, Seoul
