= C. Earl Stubbs =

American missionary (1942–2008)

- Born: December 18, 1942; Williamsburg, Pennsylvania, U.S.
- Died: July 15, 2008 (aged 65); Secunderabad, Andhra Pradesh, India
- Education: Central Bible College, Springfield, Missouri; Covenant Theological Seminary, St. Louis, Missouri
- Church: Assemblies of God, Andhra Pradesh District
- Ordained: 1973
- Congregations served: New Life Assemblies of God Church, Secunderabad, Andhra Pradesh; Assembly of God Church, Mifflinburg, Pennsylvania; Spanish Lake Assembly of God Church, St. Louis, Missouri
- Offices held: Chairperson, Governing Board of Andhra Pradesh Bible College, Miyapur, Andhra Pradesh; Administrator, Ebenezer Bible College, Bellary, Karnataka; Principal, Bethel Bible College, Punalur, Kerala
- Title: Reverend

Chalmer Earl Stubbs (December 18, 1942 – July 15, 2008) was a Missionary of the Assemblies of God World Missions deputed to India.

== Biography ==
Stubbs was born in Williamsburg, Pennsylvania. He had his schooling in Winchester, Virginia.

He got baptised on April 1, 1962 in Charlestown, West Virginia.

Stubbs had a call to serve God and enrolled at the Central Bible College, Springfield, Missouri obtained a bachelor's degree graduating in 1968.

For post-graduate studies, Stubbs joined the Covenant Theological Seminary, St. Louis, Missouri and pursued a master's degree in theological studies.

== Contribution ==
The Assemblies of God were the outcome of the Azusa Street Revival led by William J. Seymour, the initiator of the Pentecostal religious movement.

As part of its missionary endeavor, the Assemblies of God began sending their missionaries to India in the early part of twentieth century.

Stubb's was one such missionary sent to India.

=== Pastor ===
Earl Stubbs began his ministry as an Assistant Pastor at the Spanish Lake Assembly of God Church, St. Louis, Missouri in 1969. Later in 1971, he was moved to the Assembly of God Church, Mifflinburg, Pennsylvania. He was ordained by the Assemblies of God's Pennsylvania-Delaware District Council in 1973. The Assemblies of God World Missions deputed him to India to serve as their Missionary in 1975. It was in 1983 that the New Life Assembly of God Church was founded in Secunderabad.

=== Bible Teacher ===
Having arrived in India, he proceeded to Kerala and served as a Bible Teacher in the Bethel Bible College, Punalur. Stubbs also served as its Principal before moving out in 1979 to the Ebenezer Bible College, Bellary where he served as its Administrator.

Stubbs toiled to infuse sound theological education from the Pentecostal perspective to his students be it at Punalur, Bellary, or Miyapur. In fact, Stubbs pioneered the establishment of the Bible Schools in Bellary and Miyapur.

=== Leadership ===
Pastor Stubbs oversaw the ministerial work of the Assemblies of God in South India, particularly in Andhra Pradesh. He was instrumental in founding the Andhra Pradesh Bible College in Miyapur catering to the ministerial formation of the Pastors of the Assemblies of God. Stubbs drafted the Constitution of the Andhra Pradesh District of the South India Assemblies of God.

== New Life Assembly of God Church, Secunderabad ==
What started as a small fellowship of just four people in Rashtrapathi Road (formerly Kingsway) in 1983 became a mega fellowship. The New Life Assembly of God Church was founded by the Assemblies of God in Secunderabad pioneered by Stubbs.

Catering to the English-speaking Christians of the cities of Hyderabad and Secunderabad, the New Life Assembly of God Church in Secunderabad also struck original ground in winning new converts to Christianity. As for name-sake Christians, the messages of Stubbs coupled with the prevalent spiritual atmosphere in the Church made them to re-think their faith and grow in Christianity.

With the increasing number of people coming to the Church, the Assemblies of God, Andhra Pradesh District was forced to shift the Church to a new location. The Dreamland Theatre that once screened movies for the British-residents of Secunderabad was let out and it became the venue for the Sunday worship services of the New Life Assembly of God Church until July 2018. In July 2018 the congregation moved to a newly constructed sanctuary in Kompally.

Presently, the Church has more than 6000 attending the Sunday Worship spread over four services.
