= IDA Bollaram =

- Industrial Area
- Location of IDA Bollaram in Hyderabad, India. IDA Bollaram (India)
- Coordinates: 17°32′39″N 78°20′55″E
- Country: India
- State: Telangana
- District: Sangareddy district
- Mandal: Jinnaram
- Metro: Hyderabad
- Time zone: UTC+5.30 (IST)
- Postal Index Number (PIN): 502 325
- +Country Code-Area Code: +91-8458
- ISO 3166 code: IN-TG
- Vehicle registration: TS

IDA Bollaram, also known as Bollaram Industrial Area, is located in the village of Bollaram, in Jinnaram mandal of the Sangareddy district of Telangana, India. It is a part of the Hyderabad metropolitan region.

It is surrounded by Bachupally, Miyapur, Ameenpur. Many bus routes connect Miyapur and Kukatpally to IDA Bollarum.

== Industries ==
Many industries are located here like Rampex labs, Dr. Reddy's Labs, Khetan, Coca-Cola, Sujana, Mylan, Aparna, Aurobindo Pharma and many others.
