= Inter-City Bus Terminal, Hyderabad =

Bus station in Hyderabad, India

Inter City Bus Terminal

General information
- Location: Miyapur, Hyderabad, India
- Owner: HMDA

Inter City Bus Terminal (ICBT) is an upcoming bus terminus at Miyapur area of the Indian city of Hyderabad. It is owned by the HMDA and operated under a public–private partnership. The terminal once completed, would be one of the largest in Asia. The buses belonging to TSRTC will operate here. It will be one of the largest bus stations in India, with 200 bus bays. The project was cancelled in June 2018

== Location ==
It is under Planning stage on 55 acres located on Miyapur-Mumbai high-way Intermediate Ring Road connecting NH-65 & NH-44. It is right beside Miyapur metro depot and Hyderabad Metro's station, 2 km from Inner Ring Road and 4 km from Outer Ring Road.

== The Terminal ==
The terminal is being built with 200 bus bays and 30 city bus bays. The infrastructure for 1,000 buses to idle along between arrivals and departures. It will have a 1 lakh sft of commuter and passenger terminal space. The total cost is 100 crores.

== History ==
After repeated delays it was approved in June 2011 and is expected to be completed by the end of 2019.

The other existing bus stations in Hyderabad are Mahatma Gandhi Bus Station and Jubilee Bus Station.
