= Cyberabad Municipal Corporation =

Municipal government in Telangana, India

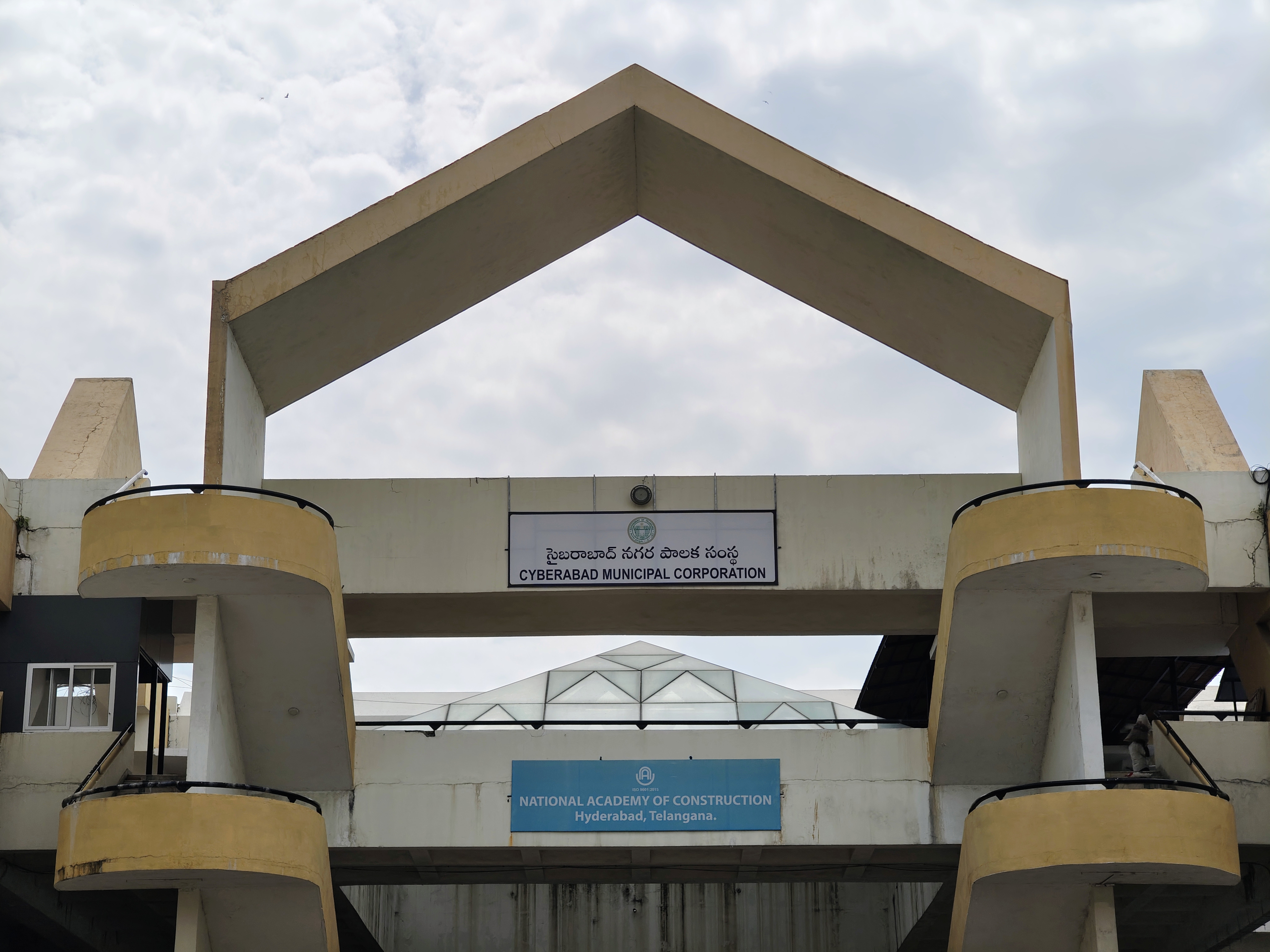

Type
- Type: Municipal corporation of Cyberabad

History
- Founded: 11 February 2026 (9 months ago)
- Preceded by: Greater Hyderabad Municipal Corporation

Leadership
- Municipal commissioner: Srijana Gummalla, IAS
- Seats: 76

Motto
- On Mission Tomorrow

Meeting place
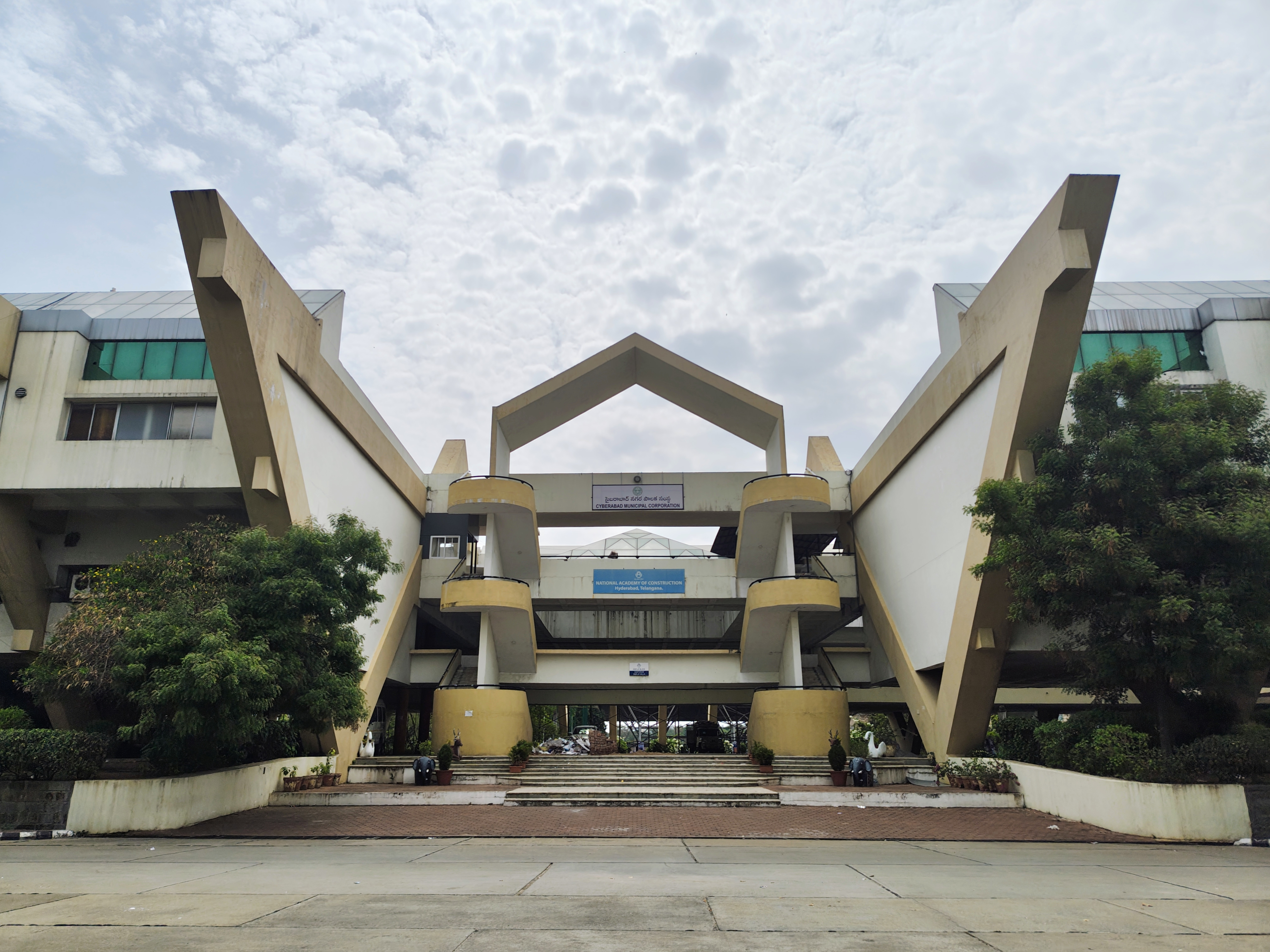
- National Academy of Construction, HITEC City, Hyderabad

Website
- cmc.telangana.gov.in

The Cyberabad Municipal Corporation (CMC) is the civic body that oversees the northern, western and few parts of north eastern areas of the Hyderabad, Telangana. It is the local government for the city of Cyberabad, within the Core Urban Region Economy (CURE) area. The CMC is responsible for civic administration, including urban planning, sanitation, road maintenance, and public health services. It is the richest municipal corporation in Telangana that covers approximately 637 km^{2} of area in Hyderabad. CMC operates from the office at the National Academy of Construction building in HITEC City. Cyberabad Municipal Corporation is governed by the Core Urban Region (Integrated Governance) Act, 2026.

== History ==
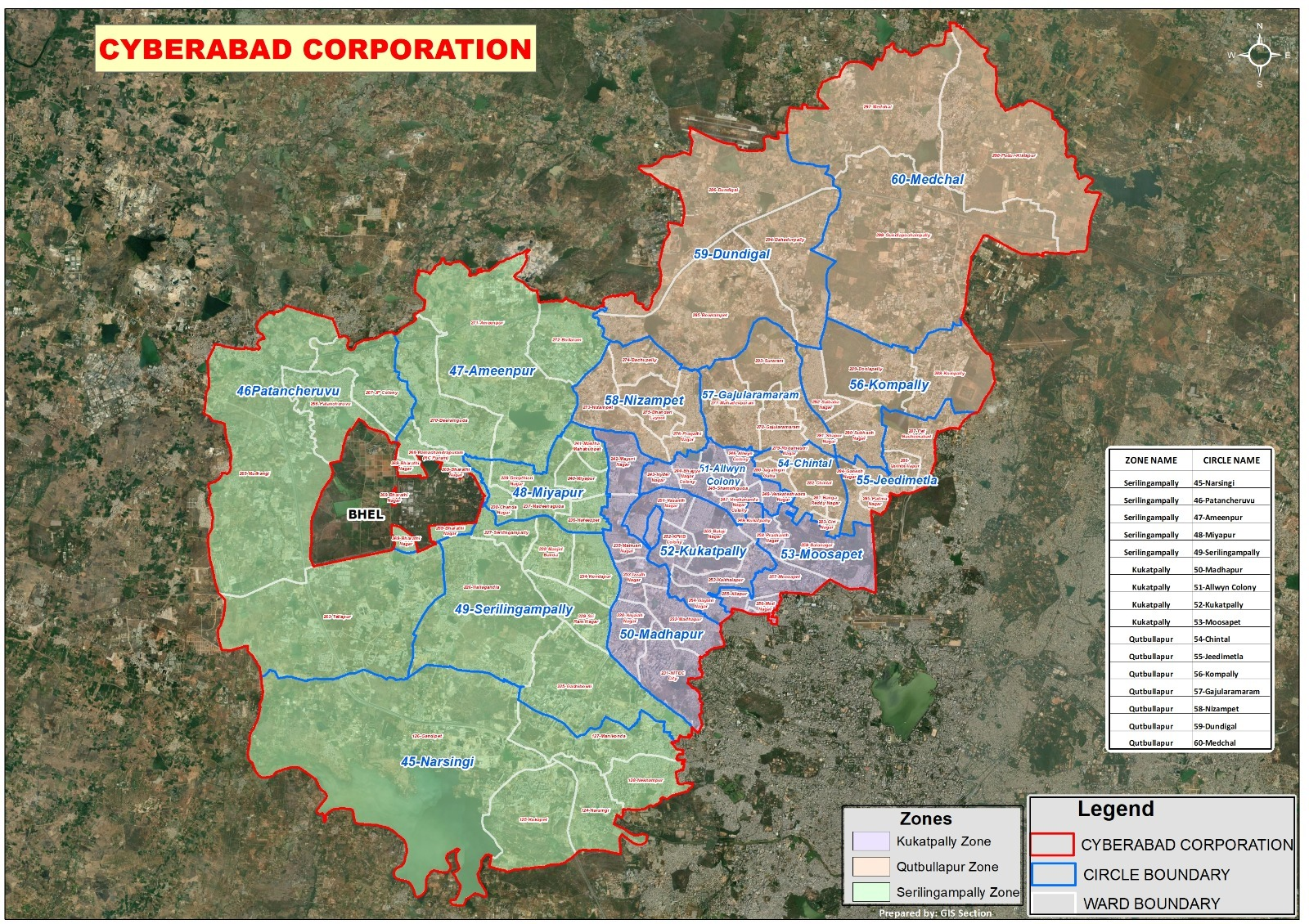
Cyberabad Municipal corporation ward map

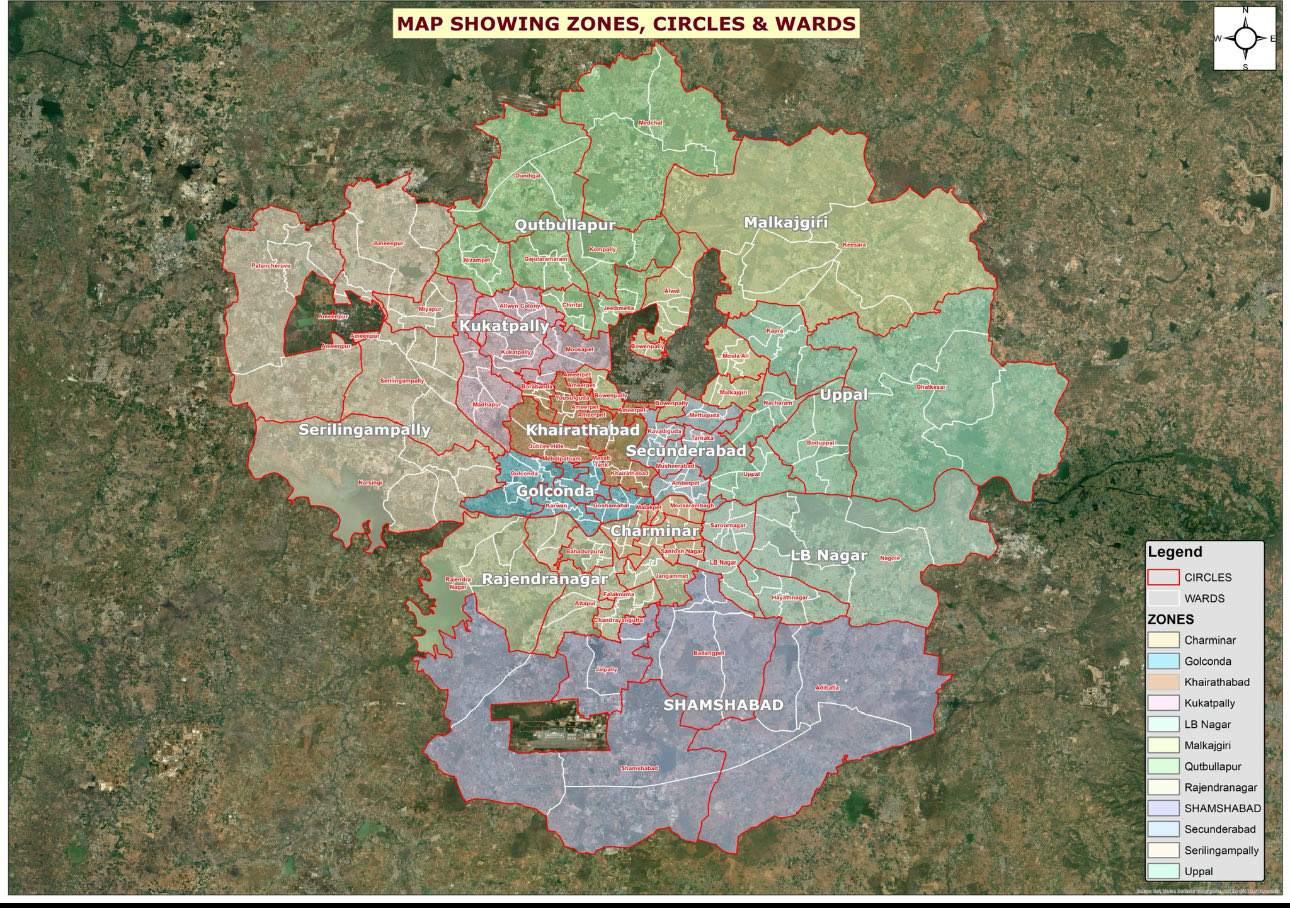
CMC alonge with GHMC and MMC

CMC was established on 11 February 2026, as part of de-merger of Greater Hyderabad Municipal Corporation. G. Srijana assumed the charge as the first municipal commissioner. In June 2026, Telangana Chief Minister Revanth Reddy laid the foundation stone for permanent headquarters building of the Cyberabad Municipal Corporation, at a cost of ₹161 crore.

=== Initiatives ===
- One Ward Every Day: In April 2026, the Cyberabad Municipal Corporation launched a "One Ward Every Day" initiative, where Commissioner G. Srijana inspects one of the 76 wards daily to address civic infrastructure, sanitation, and drainage issues.
- Hygiene assessment programme: In June 2026, Cyberabad Municipal Corporation launched the hygiene assessment programme, under which food establishments like restaurants and hotels in Cyberabad region will be evaluated on parameters such as sanitation, cleanliness, food storage practices. Based on their performance, outlets will be assigned scores ranging from 10 to 100, which will determine their hygiene ratings.

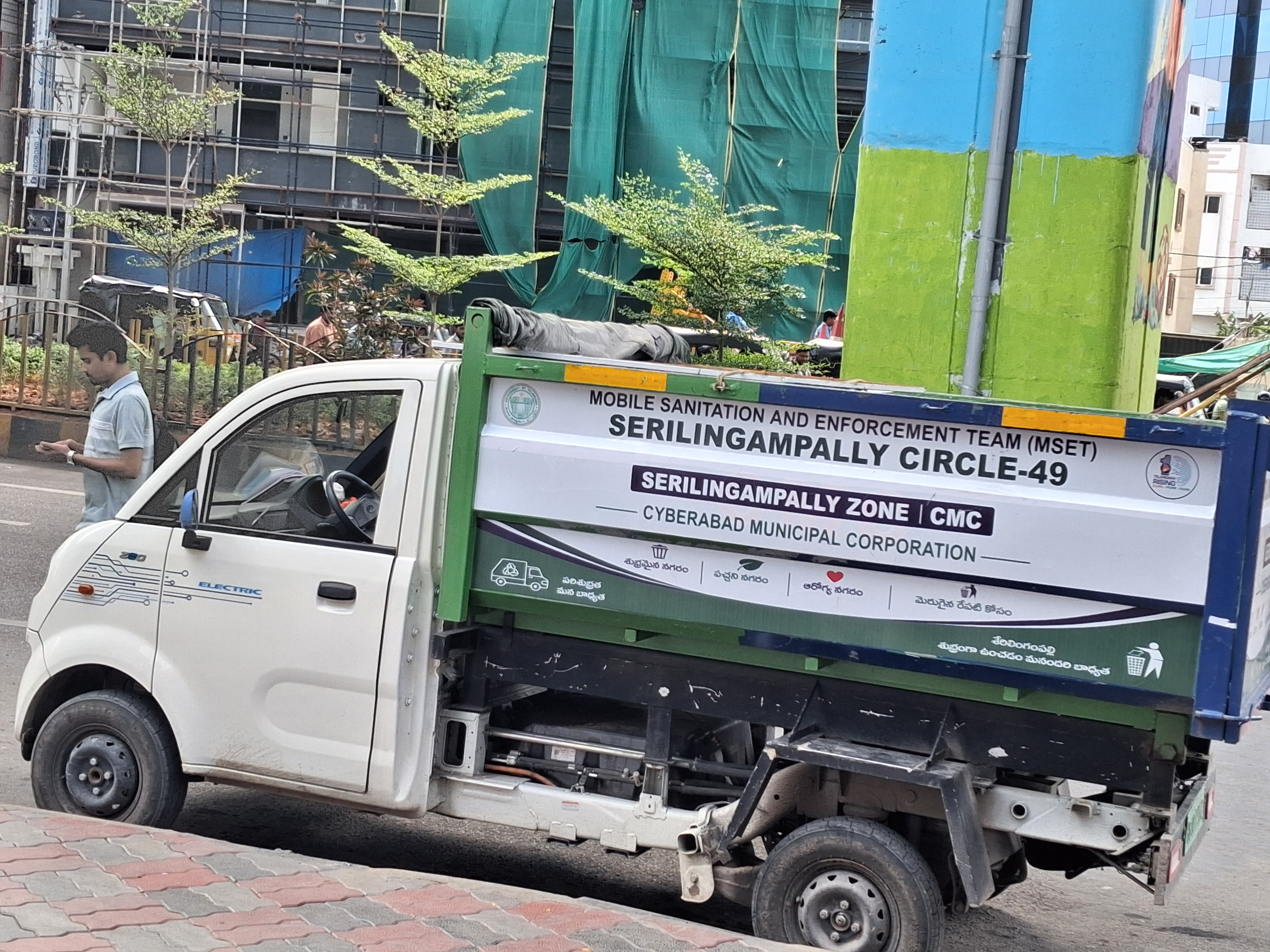
Sanitation vehicle serilingampally circle cmc

- Divine Waste Collection Drive: In July 2026, Cyberabad Municipal Corporation launched a sustainable program to collect devotional offerings like flowers, garlands, and old religious frames at designated temple collection points, preventing them from being dumped into lakes or drains.
- Bulky Household Waste Collection: Dedicated vehicles are deployed across all CMC circles every Saturday to collect unwanted bulky items (mattresses, old cupboards, and cots) to stop roadside dumping.
- Walk Free enforcement Drive: CMC has undertaken weekly removal of commercial and vendor encroachments on footpaths to improve pedestrian safety and traffic flow.
- Construction & Demolition (C&D) Waste Designed Collection Points : In August 2026, CMC opened its first dedicated C&D Waste Designed collection Point at Gowlidoddy, while supporting the recycling and resuse of construction materials. There more locations have been identified for similar facilities: HMT area of Quthbullapur zone, Mahadevpur colony in Kukatpally zone and another location in Serilingampally Zone.

== Zones, Circles and Wards ==
Zones	Circles	Wards	Total Ward count
Serilingampally	Narsingi	Narsingi	26
Serilingampally	Narsingi	Kokapet	26
Serilingampally	Narsingi	Gandipet	26
Serilingampally	Narsingi	Manikonda	26
Serilingampally	Narsingi	Neknampur	26
Serilingampally	Patancheruvu	Tellapur	26
Serilingampally	Patancheruvu	Muthangi	26
Serilingampally	Patancheruvu	Patancheruvu	26
Serilingampally	Patancheruvu	JP Colony	26
Serilingampally	Ameenpur	Ramachandrapuram (RC Puram)	26
Serilingampally	Ameenpur	Bharathi Nagar	26
Serilingampally	Ameenpur	Beeramguda	26
Serilingampally	Ameenpur	Ameenpur	26
Serilingampally	Ameenpur	Bollarum	26
Serilingampally	Miyapur	236 - Hafeezpet	26
Serilingampally	Miyapur	237 - Madeenaguda	26
Serilingampally	Miyapur	238 - Chanda Nagar	26
Serilingampally	Miyapur	239 - Deepthisri Nagar	26
Serilingampally	Miyapur	240 - Miyapur	26
Serilingampally	Miyapur	241 - Maktha Mahabubpet	26
Serilingampally	Serilingampally	225 - Gachibowli	26
Serilingampally	Serilingampally	226 - Nallagandla	26
Serilingampally	Serilingampally	227 - Serilingampally	26
Serilingampally	Serilingampally	228 - Masjid Banda	26
Serilingampally	Serilingampally	229 - Sri Ram Nagar	26
Serilingampally	Serilingampally	234 - Kondapur	26
Kukatpally	Madhapur	230 - Anjaiah Nagar	23
Kukatpally	Madhapur	231 - HITEC City	23
Kukatpally	Madhapur	232 - Madhapur	23
Kukatpally	Madhapur	233 - Izzat Nagar	23
Kukatpally	Madhapur	235 - Matrusri Nagar	23
Kukatpally	Madhapur	242 - Mayuri Nagar	23
Kukatpally	Allwyn Colony	Hyder nagar	23
Kukatpally	Allwyn Colony	Bhagya Nagar Colony	23
Kukatpally	Allwyn Colony	Shamshiguda	23
Kukatpally	Allwyn Colony	Allwyn Colony	23
Kukatpally	Allwyn Colony	Vivekananda Nagar Colony	23
Kukatpally	Allwyn Colony	Venkateshwara Nagar	23
Kukatpally	Kukatpally	Kukatpally	23
Kukatpally	Kukatpally	Balaji Nagar	23
Kukatpally	Kukatpally	Vasanth Nagar	23
Kukatpally	Kukatpally	KPHB Colony	23
Kukatpally	Kukatpally	Kaithepally	23
Kukatpally	Kukatpally	Gayatri Nagar	23
Kukatpally	Moosapet	Allapur	23
Kukatpally	Moosapet	Moti Nagar	23
Kukatpally	Moosapet	Moosapet	23
Kukatpally	Moosapet	Prashanth Nagar	23
Kukatpally	Moosapet	Balanagar	23
Quthbullapur	Chintal	Rodamestri Nagar	27
Quthbullapur	Chintal	Jagathgirigutta	27
Quthbullapur	Chintal	Ranga Reddy Nagar	27
Quthbullapur	Chintal	Chintal	27
Quthbullapur	Chintal	Giri Nagar	27
Quthbullapur	Jeedimetla	Ganesh Nagar	27
Quthbullapur	Jeedimetla	Padma Nagar	27
Quthbullapur	Jeedimetla	Quthbullapur	27
Quthbullapur	Jeedimetla	Pet Basheerabad	27
Quthbullapur	Kompally	Kompally	27
Quthbullapur	Kompally	Doolapally	27
Quthbullapur	Kompally	Subhash Nagar	27
Quthbullapur	Kompally	Saibaba Nagar	27
Quthbullapur	Gajularamaram	Mahadevapuram	27
Quthbullapur	Gajularamaram	Gajularamaram	27
Quthbullapur	Gajularamaram	Shapur Nagar	27
Quthbullapur	Gajularamaram	Suraram	27
Quthbullapur	Nizampet	273 - Nizampet	27
Quthbullapur	Nizampet	274 - Bachupally	27
Quthbullapur	Nizampet	275 - Bandari Layout	27
Quthbullapur	Nizampet	276 - Pragathi Nagar	27
Quthbullapur	Dundigal	Bahadurpally	27
Quthbullapur	Dundigal	Bowrampet	27
Quthbullapur	Dundigal	Dundigal	27
Quthbullapur	Medchal	Medchal	27
Quthbullapur	Medchal	Pudur-Kistapur	27
Quthbullapur	Medchal	Gundlapochampally	27
3	16	76	

== See also ==
- Administrative divisions of Hyderabad
- Cyberabad Metropolitan Police
- Hyderabad Metropolitan Development Authority
