= Pragathi Nagar =

- Residential
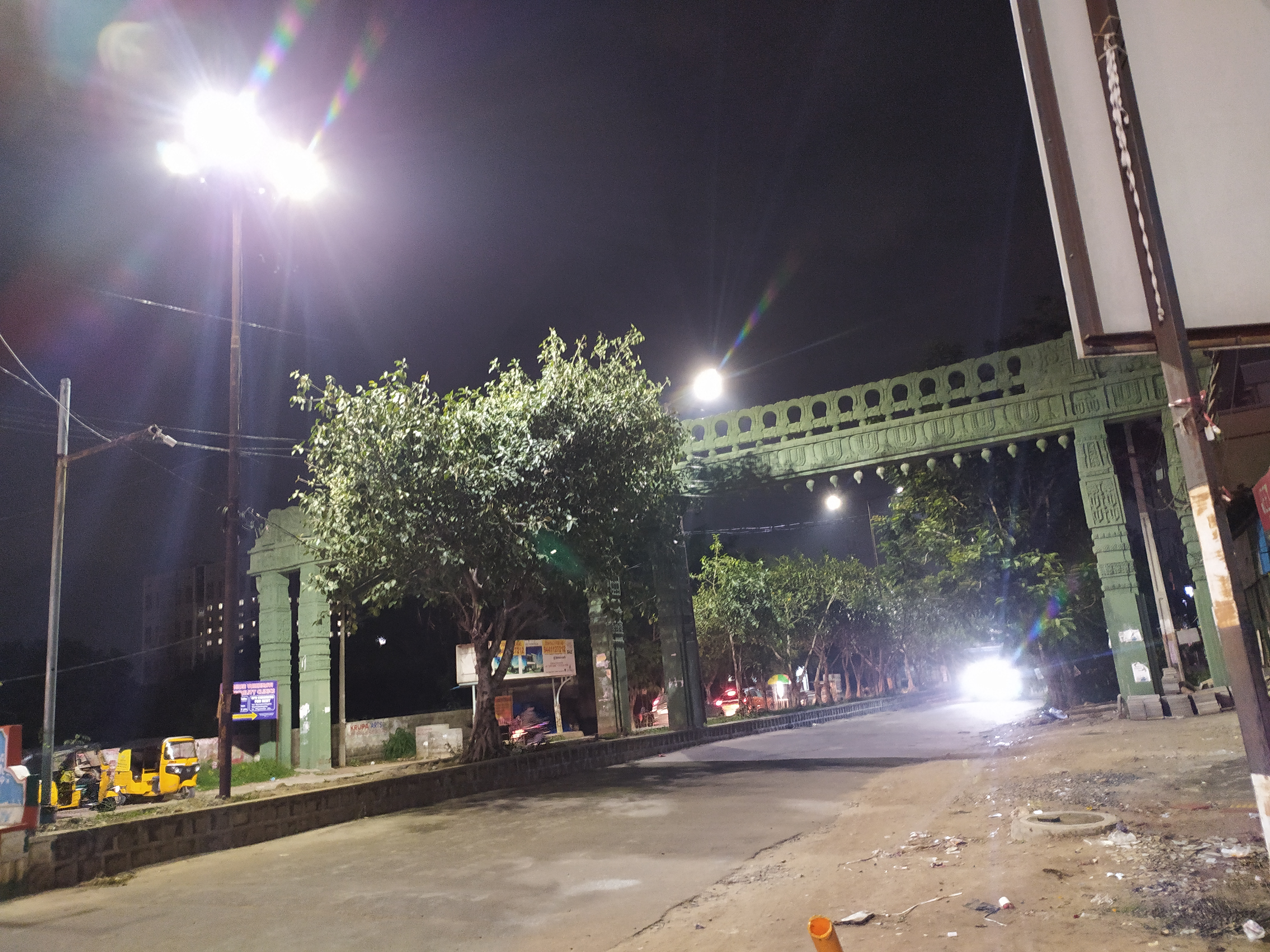

- Location Telangana, India Pragathi Nagar (Telangana) Pragathi Nagar (India)
- Coordinates: 17.5212°N 78.3964°E
- Country: India
- State: Telangana
- Region: Telangana
- District: Medchal district

Languages
  - Official: Telugu, Urdu
- Time zone: UTC+5:30 (IST)
- PIN: 500090
- Telephone code: 91-040
- Vehicle registration: TG 07
- Lok Sabha constituency: Malkajgiri Lok Sabha constituency
- Vidhan Sabha constituency: Quthbullapur Assembly constituency
- Distance from Hyderabad: 35 kilometres (22 mi) NW (rail)
- Distance from Delhi: 1,598 kilometres (993 mi) N (land)
- Distance from Mumbai: 793 kilometres (493 mi) W (land)
- Distance from Chennai: 690 kilometres (430 mi) S (land)
- Climate: Tropical (Köppen)
- Avg. annual temperature: 35 °C (95 °F)
- Avg. summer temperature: 39 °C (102 °F)
- Avg. winter temperature: 19 °C (66 °F)
- Website: telangana.gov.in

Pragathi Nagar is a residential colony in Kukatpally, Hyderabad, India. It is a residential suburb in Kukatpally and is situated at a distance of around 3.4 kilometres from the Kukatpally locality. It is situated around 2.5 kilometres away from the Jawaharlal Nehru Technological University, Hyderabad.

== History & Demographics ==
Pragathi Nagar was stablished in the early 1990s as a cooperative housing society, mainly for middle class private sector employees. Following the separation of Telangana in 2014, Pragathi Nagar emerged as a thriving hub for residential activities, mainly amongst the middle to upper-middle class workers of Pharma, Construction and IT industries. Its proximity to the HITEC City and Gachibowli corridors (within a 10–12 km radius) was a major reason in its growth as a residential hub.

The demographic profile is concentrated in the middle-to-upper-middle-class brackets, primarily comprising professionals in the IT/ITES, pharmaceutical, and higher education sectors. The Urban Census conducted in 2026 indicates a significant multicultural migrant population, consisting of little to no native residents, as much of the region was an uninhabited forest-like arid region pre-1980s. Due to the composition of its population, there is a high local demand for diverse retail and regional services. Notably, the suburb maintains one of the highest child-to-adult ratios in the Medchal-Malkajgiri district, directly influencing the local economy's heavy leaning toward LKG/PP1-12 educational institutions and various small-scale tuition points and academic coaching centres.

== Geography ==
Pragathi Nagar has an average elevation of 33 metres (108 ft) and is situated on the plains. Pragathi Nagar is located around 3 miles (4.8 km) to the west of the National Highway 65 in Nizampet. Pragathi Nagar is centred largely around Ambar Lake, which has been the centre of various environmental conservation efforts.

== Real Estate & NACA Lands ==
Pragathi Nagar is a highly-sought after real estate market which has seen consistent growth of 10-14% per annum for the last 20 years. It is largely driven by its proximity to industrial areas, JNTU, JNTU Metro as well as several educational and commercial areas. As of 2026, the area is classified as a mid-segment residential micro-market. The average land cost averages from ₹7,000 to ₹8,500 per square foot, though the price in residential areas and suburban neighbourhoods may far exceed these figures. The local market is heavily influenced by its proximity to the IT and pharmaceutical corridors of HITEC City and Bachupally, making it a preferred location for working professionals. While the landscape is dominated by gated communities and multi-story apartment complexes—with over 24 major projects active or recently completed, — the commercial sector consists of various retail chains like Vijetha Retail Stores, More Supermarkets, Polimera's Farmers' Market, healthcare clinics like Prasad Hospital, People's Hospital, and private educational service providers such as Pragathi Group and Narayana Group as well as recreational facilities and restaurants.

== Schooling & Education Facilities ==
Pragathi Nagar consists of various schools, which mainly serve students upto Class X across CBSE and TG SSC boards. Pragathi Central School is the colony's largest school, which serves nearly 12,000 CBSE students from Grades PP-I to X. Narayana Olympiad School, Pragathi Nagar is one of the colony's largest schools which operates through the TG SSC board till Class X, with a focus on IIT and Olympiad preparation.

== Governance & Civic Issues ==
Pragathi Nagar falls under the jurisdiction of the Quthbullapur Assembly constituency and was administrated by the Greater Hyderabad Municipal Corporation (GHMC) under 2025. Following the 2025 delimitation and GHMC restructuring, Pragathi Nagar is now administered by the Cyberabad Municipal Corporation (CMC). Civic administration focuses mainly on the maintenance of the roads across the colony and also the Pragathi Nagar Lake (Amber Cheruvu), which has seen several periods of environmental decline, mainly caused by waste dumping of surrounding apartment complexes which encroached on the lake's catchment area. Plastic dumping by residents and pedestrians on the Amber Lake road. It has been the centre of significant intervention by the Hyderabad Disaster Management & Asset Protection Agency (HYDRAA). Despite these efforts, the area faces recurring civic challenges, including seasonal water logging around the lake and severe traffic congestion at the Amber Road, particularly during peak school and office hours.

The street-side vendors surrounding Amber Lake's roads, especially fishermen, have reported consistent seasonal foul smells emerging from rotting organic material within the lake. Often, drainage and sewage, illegally dumped into the lake from surrounding residential complexes, is responsible for this pollution. The fishing industry of Amber lake has been heavily afflicted as a result, due to bioaccumulation concerns. The general consensus among the population is that avoiding consumption of fishes from Amber is best as people report Diarrhoea and several infections due to arising complications resulting from their consumption. The #RunForPragathi project was established by Class X students in early 2026. The project aims to complete 10,000 kilometres of community jogging/running around Amber Lake from April 14th, 2026 to December 31st, 2026, in order to raise awareness about the lake's degrading ecosystem and enhance conservation efforts.

== See also ==
- People's Hospital, Pragathi Nagar
