= Comic Con India =

Series of comic conventions in India

- Status: Active
- Locations: New Delhi, Mumbai, Pune, Hyderabad, Bangalore, Ahmedabad, Chennai, Kolkata, Kochi
- Country: India
- Inaugurated: 2011
- Attendance: 200,000 in 2017 (all 4 cities combined)
- Website: https://www.comicconindia.com/

Comic Con India (CCI) is a series of annual comic-based conventions held in India. The first edition was held in New Delhi in 2011 and over the years has expanded to other major cities in India such as Mumbai, Bangalore, Pune, Hyderabad, Ahmadabad, Chennai, Kolkata and Kochi. There are annual comic cons now in all these cities. Cumulatively these five cities attract over 200,000 visitors with over 1200 exhibitors. Jatin Varma, the founder & managing director of Comic Con India, launched the first comic con in India in Delhi in 2011. Since 2014, Comic Con India has been conducted in collaboration with ReedPop, the organisers of the New York Comic Con and the MCM London Comic Con.

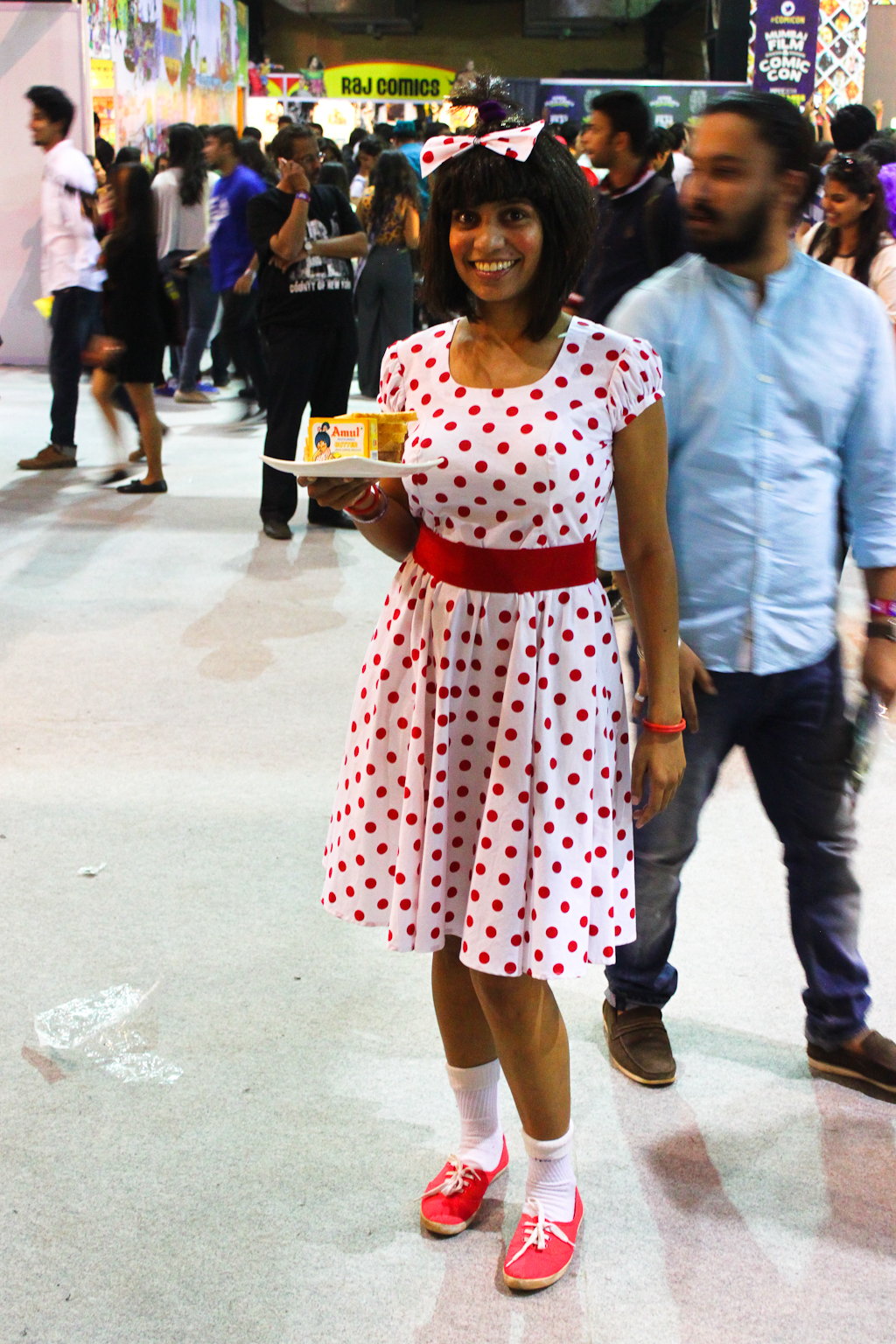
Cosplay of the Amul girl at the Mumbai Film and Comic Con 2014.

Cosplay has been a major part of the events. During the first Comic Con in 2011, there were only 13 cosplay participants. By 2017 the number of cosplayers crossed 2000. Comic Con India also hosts the Indian Championship of Cosplay.

== Indian Championship of Cosplay ==
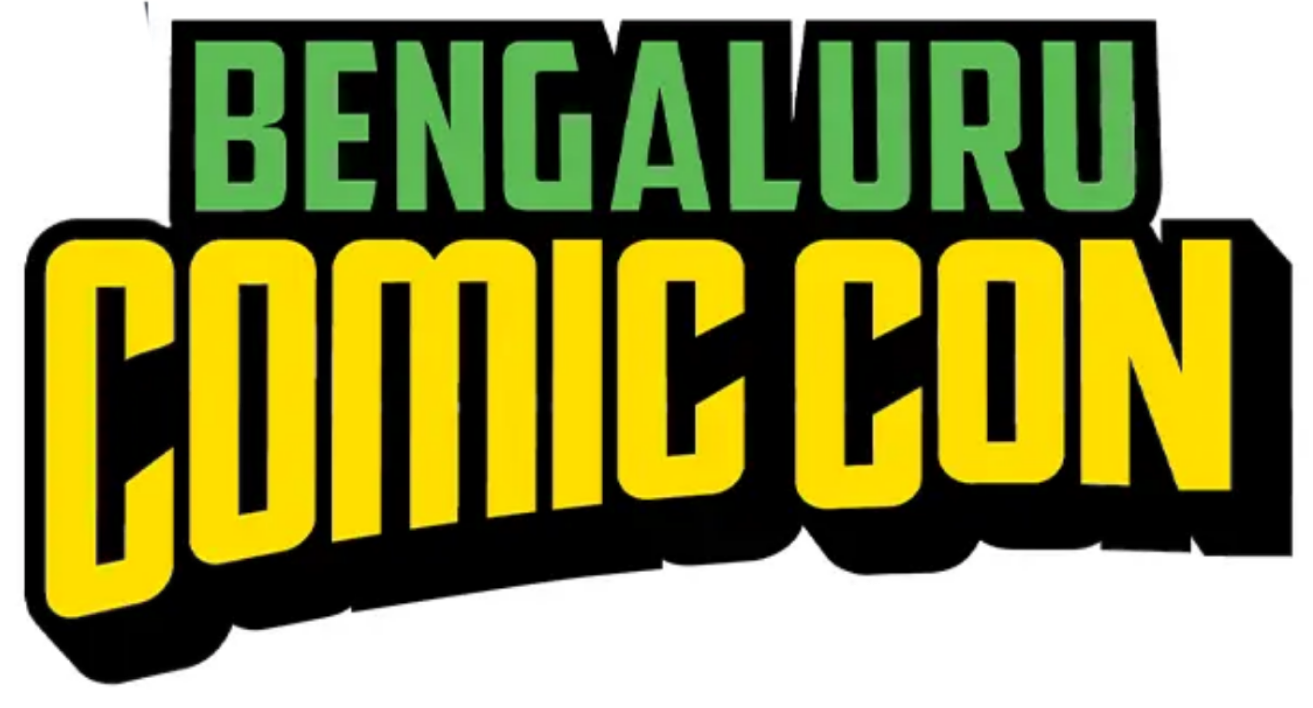
Bengaluru Comic Con latest logo

Comic Con India hosts the Indian Championship of Cosplay. Winners from each of the cosplay events held at the Comic Cons in Delhi, Mumbai, Bangalore, Hyderabad and Pune directly enter into the competition as finalists, and accordingly a final winner is chosen. The winner of the Indian Championship of Cosplay then represents India at the Crown World Championships of Cosplay, Chicago Comic Con.

In 2018, a Mumbai cosplayer won the Indian championship. Jeet Molankar won for cosplaying Reinhardt from Overwatch.

== Comic Con 2019 ==
Comic Cons in 2019
City	Dates	Remarks	Cite
Hyderabad	12 - 13 October	Guests included Nathan W. Pyle	
Bengaluru	16 - 17 November	Guests included Charlotte Flair	
Mumbai	7 - 8 December	Guests included Larry Hama, Allison Sampson and Sachi Ediriweera	
New Delhi	20 - 22 December		
Ahmedabad	1 - 2 February 2020	Guests included Dan Parent	

== Comic Con 2018 ==
Comic Cons in 2018
City	Dates	Remarks	Cite
Hyderabad	13 - 14 October		
Bengaluru	17 - 18 November		
New Delhi	7 - 9 December	Notable guests include John Layman, Declan Shalvey, Peter Nguyen, Vladimir Furdik	
Mumbai	22 - 23 December		
Pune		No official Comic Con held in Pune due to venue problems	

Delhi Comic Con 2019- 19th edition of comic con India will be a multicity event check out the full article for all the insights - showcase Delhi - COMIC CON INDIA 2019, A Treat For All The Super Hero Fans Is All Set To Roll Out.

=== Delhi Comic Con 2018 ===
The eighth edition of the Maruti Suzuki Delhi Comic Con 2018 was held from 7 to 9 December 2018 at NSIC Exhibition Ground in Okhla, New Delhi. Notable guests includes actor Vladimir Furdik, (who plays the Night King in Game of Thrones), John Layman and Declan Shalvey. The three day event also has a daily cosplay prize pool of over Rs 50,000. Grand Prize winners also qualify for the National Indian Championships of Cosplay.

A 2019 edition of Comic Con was planned.

== Comic Con 2017 ==
=== Delhi Comic Con 2017 ===
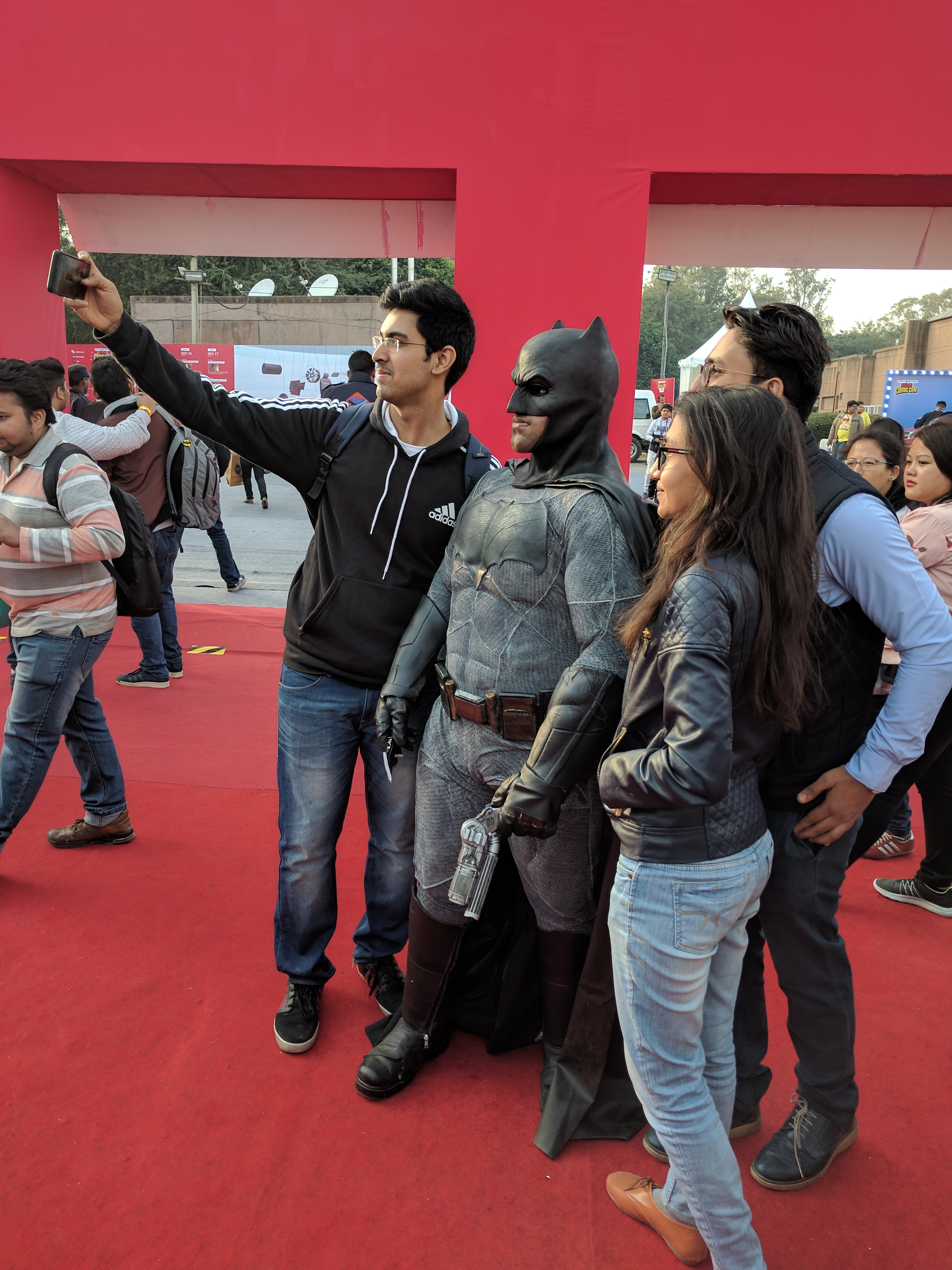
Batman cosplay at Delhi Comic Con 2017

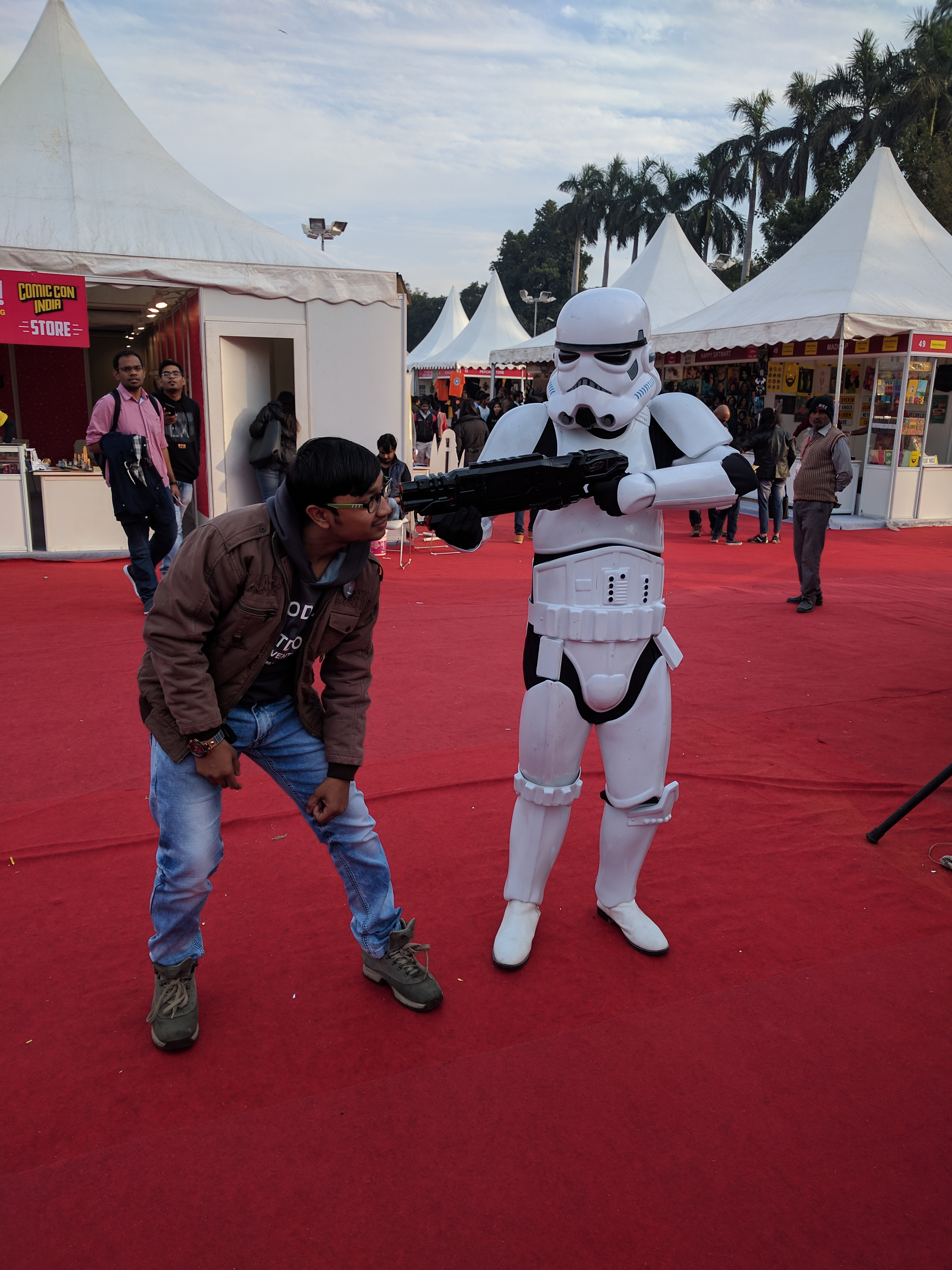
Stormtrooper Cosplay at Delhi Comic Con 2017

The seventh season of Delhi Comic Con, Maruti Suzuki Delhi Comic Con 2017, was held between 15 December and 17 December 2017 at NSIC Exhibition Ground in Okhla, New Delhi. The international guest line-up included Dan Parent, an artist of Archie Comics; Ryan North, creator of webcomics series Dinosaur Comics and Sonny Liew, multiple Eisner award-winning artist. Special sessions took place with Indian artists such as Abhijeet Kini, illustrator for Tinkle, Aniruddho Chakraborty of Chariot, Sailesh Gopalan of Brown Paperbag, Akshay Dhar of Meta Desi, among others. Apart from launching the 'Delhi edition' of Archie Comics, the event saw other attractions including six experiential and gaming zones and exclusive merchandise. The ESL Indian Premiership Final was also held which had prize money of 15 lakhs.

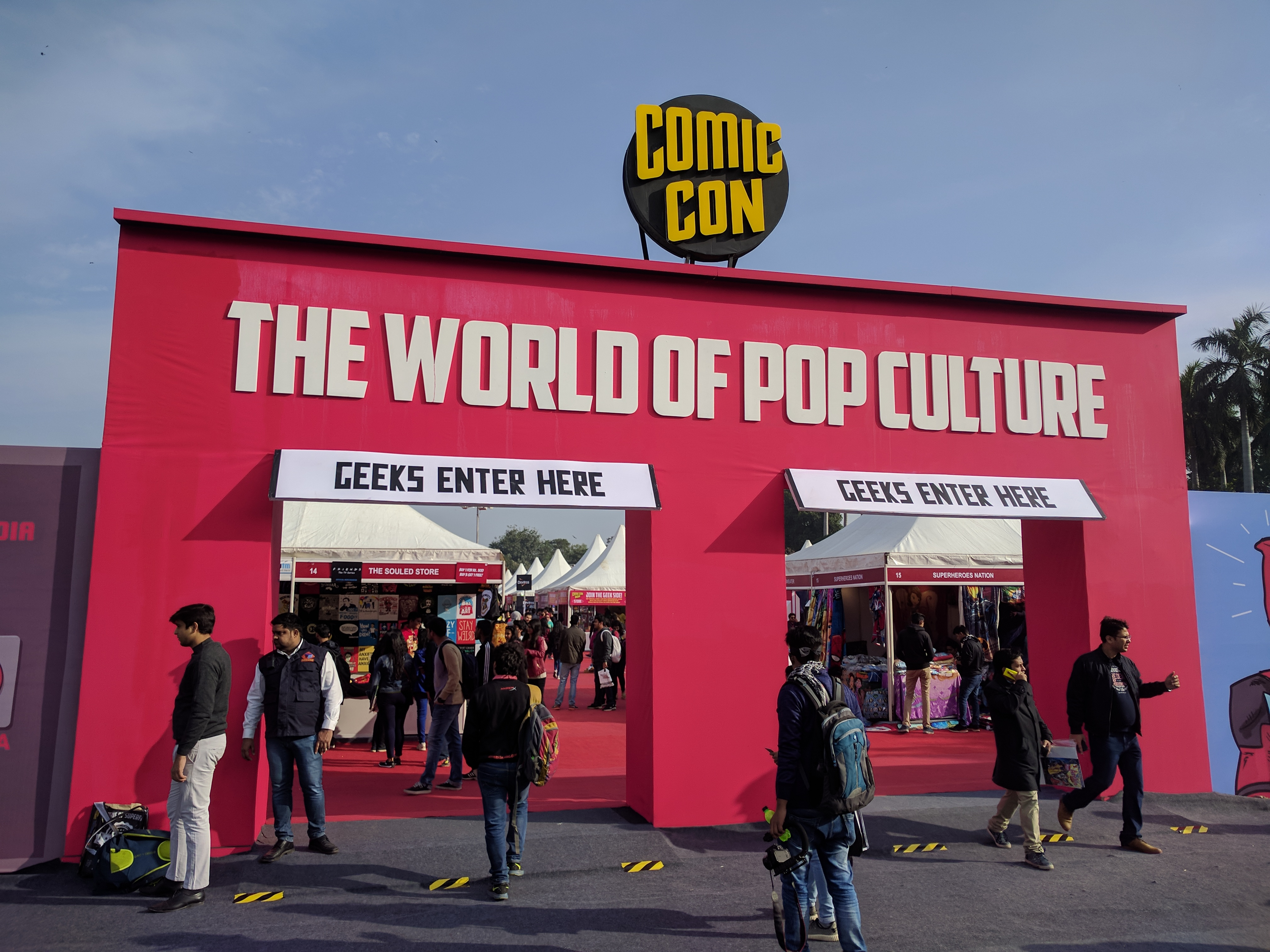
Entrance of New Delhi Comic Con 2017

=== Bengaluru Comic Con 2017 ===
The sixth annual Bengaluru Comic Con was held from 2 December 2017 at the KTPO Convention Centre in Whitefield, Bengaluru. Scott Hampton, illustrator of Batman and Star Trek, was part of the event.

=== Mumbai Comic Con 2017 ===
The Mumbai Comic Con 2017 took place on 11–12 November at Bombay Exhibition Centre in Goregaon, Mumbai. Internationally renowned artists and illustrators Nick Seluk, Yishan Li, David Lloyd were part of the event.

=== Hyderabad Comic Con 2017 ===
The fifth annual Hyderabad Comic Con took place on 14–15 October, Hitex Exhibition Centre, Izzat Nagar, Hyderabad. The event saw some amazing cosplay.

== Comic Con 2016 ==
Delhi Comic 2016

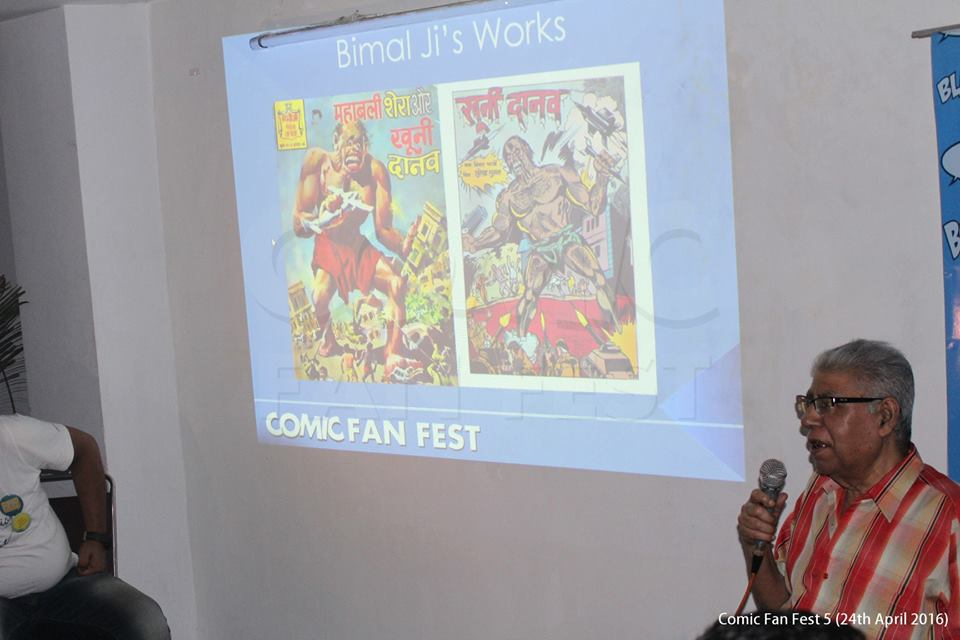
Bimal ji sharing his experience at Comic Fan Fest 5. In background cover of a comic written by Mr. Bimal Chatterjee which broke all records that time.

Delhi Comic Con 2016 took place on 9, 10 December and 11, 2016 between 11 am to 8 pm at NSIC Grounds, Okhla. Celebrities present included Mr. Bimal Chatterjee (writer), Tom Richmond, Joe Harris, DJ Elliot, Gaurav Gera.

Hyderabad Comic Con 2016

The Hyderabad Comic Con 2016 took place at the Hitex Exhibition Centre on 24–25 September. International celebrities at the event included Dan Parent, David Lloyd and Afshan Azad.

== Comic Con 2015 ==
Delhi Comic Con 2015

This Comic Con was held at NSIC Exhibition Grounds in Delhi on 4 to 6 December. International celebrities included, Kristian Nairn, who plays Hodor in the popular TV series Game of Thrones, Ty Templeton, 3 time Eisner award-winning artist of Batman, Rob Denbleyker, creator of Cyanide and Happiness and Dinesh Shamdasani CEO of Valiant Comics.

Bangalore Comic Con 2015

The Comic con was held at White Orchid Convention Centre near Manyata Tech Park, Bangalore from 3 April 2015 to 5 April 2015. Game of Thrones star Natalia Tena and Daniel Portman were special guests at the event.

== Comic Con 2014 ==
Delhi Comic Con 2014

The fourth Annual Indian Comic Con was held at Thyagaraj Sports Complex, Delhi from 7 to 9 February 2014.

Bangalore Comic Con 2014

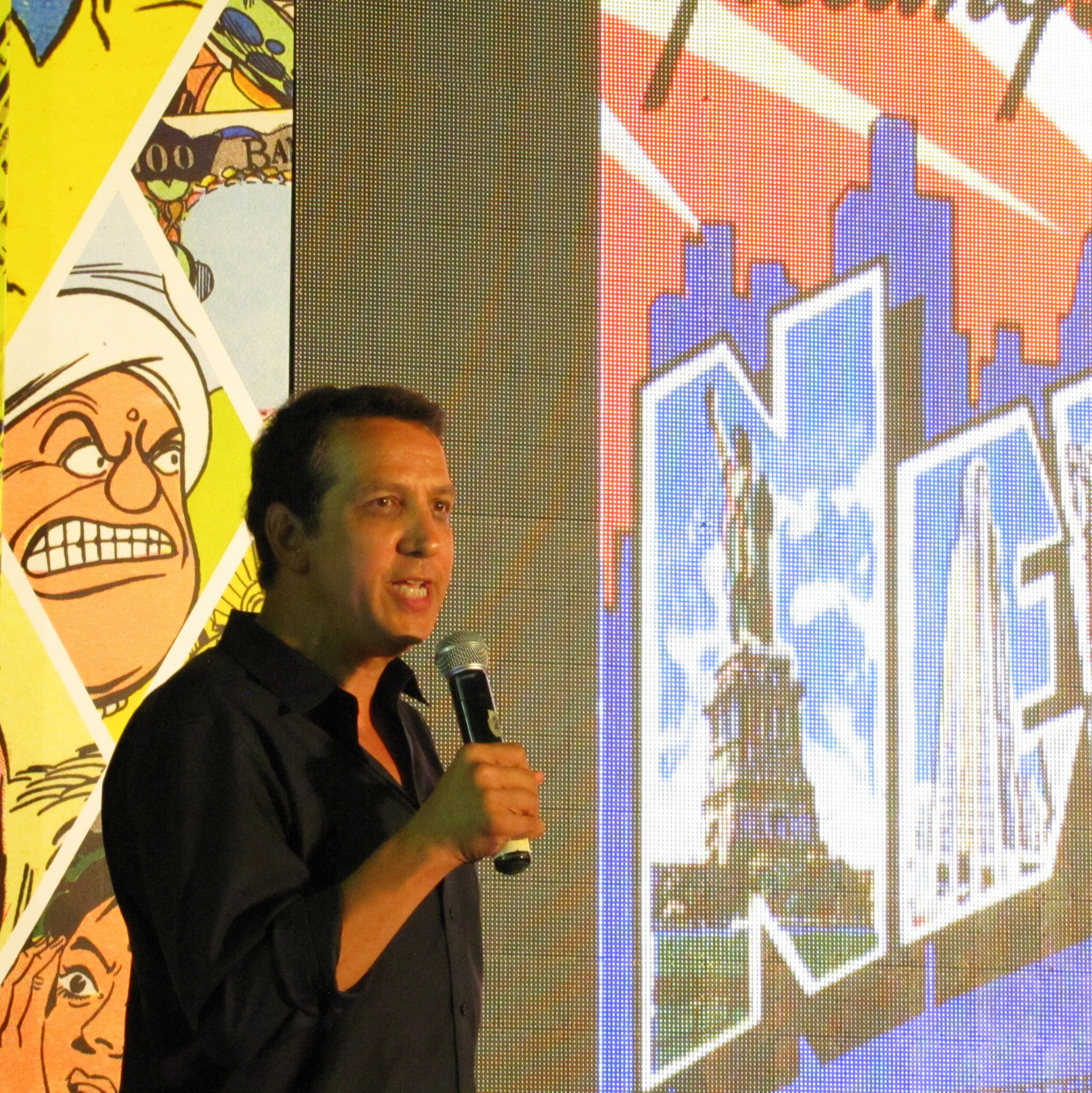
American Cartoonist Peter Kuper at Comic Con 2014 Bangalore

The Comic con was held at White Orchid Convention Centre near Manyata Tech Park, Bangalore from 12 to 14 September 2014. The event witnessed workshops and live chats with international celebrities like Dan Parent, Peter Kuper and David Lloyd among others.

Mumbai Comic Con 2014

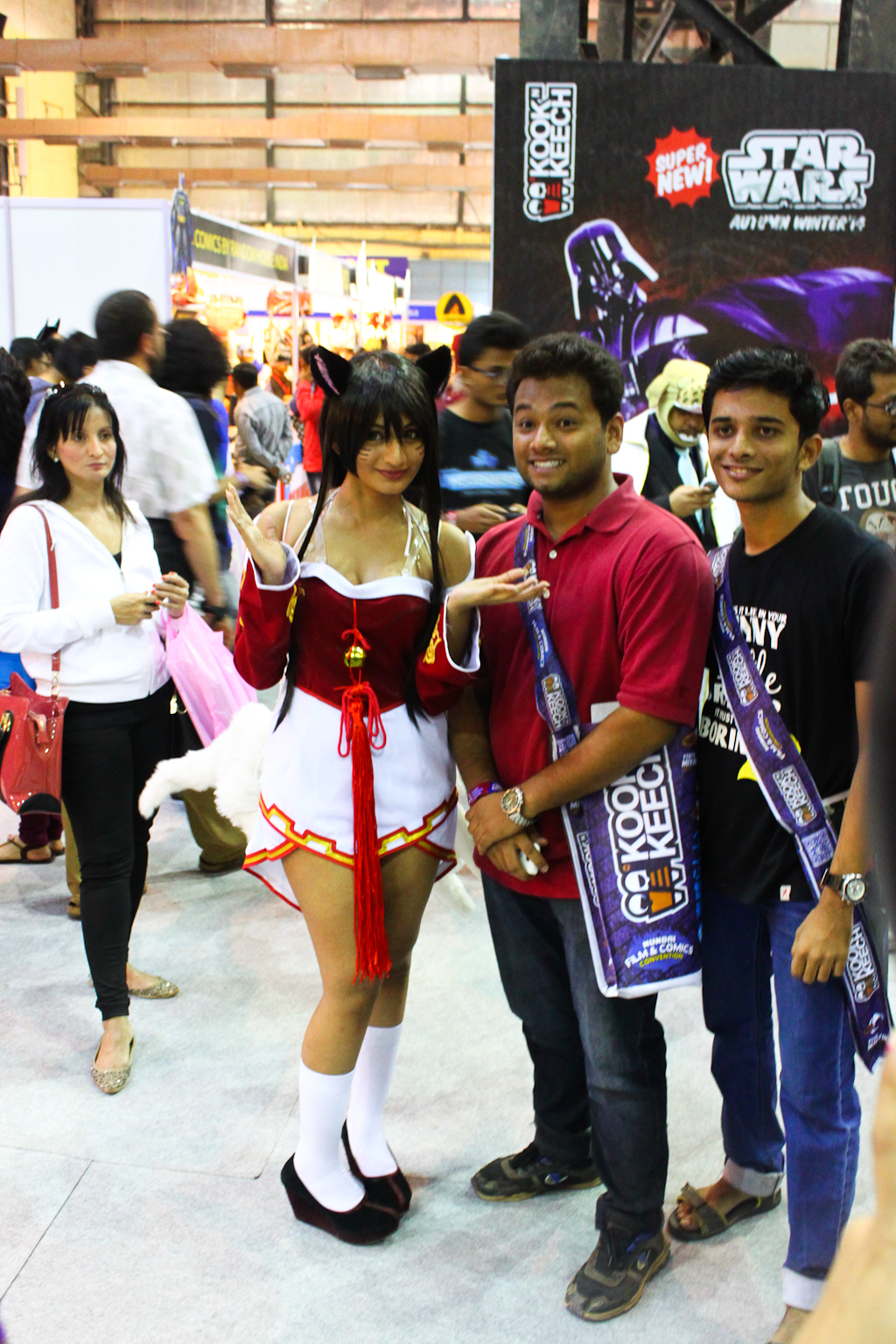
A female cosplayer, Niha Novcaine, dressed as Ahri from the League of Legends, poses with fans in Mumbai

The Mumbai Film and Comic Convention took place at The Bombay Exhibition Center, Goregaon on 19, 20 and 21 December. There was a long line up of International and Indian artists, writers which included guests Nick Spencer, Nicholas Wild and Dan Goldman among many others. The highlight of Mumbai Comic Con 2014 was Mark Gatiss writer and actor, co-creator and executive producer of Sherlock (BBC). This was for the first time ever that Comic Con India had brought an international actor as a special guest. All the three days saw fans dressed up as various film, television and comic characters for Cosplay.

== Comic Con 2013 ==
Delhi Comic Con 2013

The third Annual Indian Comic Con was held from 8 to 10 February 2013, with the location remaining the same i.e. New Delhi.

Free Comic Book Weekend 2013

Online digital content marketplace Readwhere partnered with Comic Con India to launch a new initiative called Free Comic Book Weekend, to allow Readwhere users to download Indian comics for free on 4–5 May 2013.

Bangalore Comic Con 2013

After the tremendous response at Comic Con Express in 2012, Comic Con India, the event organisers, held a two-day annual Comic Convention in Bangalore. Bangalore's first annual Comic Con India was held on 1 & 2 June 2013 at Koramangala Indoor Stadium, National Games Village.

Bangalore Comic Con 2013 had lot of attractions with the presence of celebrities, stalls of Vintage Comics, Madhuvanthi Mohan's sketches, Hysteria Store selling official merchandise and book launches from popular Publishers like Holy Cow, Campfire Graphic Novels and Manta Ray.

== Comic Con 2012 ==
Delhi Comic Con 2012

The second Annual Indian Comic Con was held from 17 to 19 February 2012 at the same location i.e. New Delhi.

Bangalore Comic Con 2012

Express Edition of Comic Con was held in Bangalore on 8 and 9 September 2012. On 28 July Comic Con India in association with Mocha (Coffees & Conversations) organised a "Special Session With Sufi Comics" was organized as a setting-stage event for Comic Con Express Bengaluru

Mumbai film and Comic Convention 2012

Express Edition of Comic Con was held in Mumbai on 20 and 21 October 2012.

== Comic Con 2011 ==
Delhi Comic Con 2011

The first ever convention was hosted by Twenty Onwards Media between 19 and 20 February 2011 at Dilli Haat, New Delhi, India. It showcased stalls by several Indian publishing houses, including, but not restricted to, Amar Chitra Katha, Vimanika Comics, Diamond Comics, Kshiraj Telang, Manta Ray, Level 10 Comics, Campfire and many other new and upcoming publishers.

The Comic Con lasted for 2 days, and included several workshops, interactive sessions, interviews and speeches by various comic book artists and writers. Around 15,000 people attended. A few animation and multi-media productions had set up their stalls as well, and also conducted seminars about animation design and future of animation industry in India. The convention was inaugurated by chairman of National Book Trust, Dr. Bipin Chandra.

As traditionally associated with Comic Cons, several fans, both adults and children, participated in the cosplay which was one of India's first event of this type. On the last day of the event, Uncle Pai, a renowned educationalist and creator of Indian comics, in particular the Amar Chitra Katha and Tinkle was presented a Lifetime Achievement Award by Cartoonist Pran, one of the most successful Indian cartoonists, best known as the creator of Chacha Chaudhary.

Mumbai Comic Con 2011

The first Comic Con Express was held in Mumbai during weekend of 22 and 23 October 2011. The Comic Con Express is the travelling version of the Annual Indian Comics Convention. The two-day event had 60 participants, 45 exhibits and many interactive sessions, contests and fun events for comic lovers.

== Comic Con India Awards ==
The first Comic Con India awards were awarded on 16 February 2012, at India International Centre, New Delhi. The awards were awarded to provide impetus to the publishers and artists of the comic book industry of the country.

Comic Con India Awards 2020

Categories	Gold Winner	Silver Winner	Bronze Winner
Best Graphic Novel/Comic Book	Chanakya: Of Serpents & Kings (Campfire Graphic Novels)	Chhotu (Penguin Random House India)	The Beginning (Indusverse Comics)
Best Penciller/Inker or Penciller/Inker Team	Rajesh Nagulakonda, Chanakya: Of Serpents & Kings	Gaurav Srivastav, The Last Asuran	Saumin Suresh Patel, The Stunt
Best Writer	Varud Gupta & Ayushi Rastogi, Chhotu	Lianne Texeira Singh & Arunabh Kumar, The Beginning	Manek D'Silva, Bonabyl
Best Web Comic	Garbage Bin	Corporat Comics	Bakarmax
Best Colorist	Vijay Sharma, Prince of Ayodhya	Prasad Patnaik, The Last Asuran	Manek D'Silva, Bonabyl
Best Children's Illustrated Book	Tinkle Holiday Special 48	The Enchanted Prince (Scholastic India)	The Jungle Radio (Penguin Random House India)
Best Cover	Prince of Ayodhya (Campfire Graphic Novels)	Rama's Ring (Amar Chitra Katha)	The Stunt (Indusverse Comics)
Fan Favorite Exhibitor	Wizplex India	Games The Shop	Planet Superheroes
Fan Favorite Publisher	Simon & Schuster India	Hachette India	Penguin Random House India

Comic Con India Awards 2019

Categories	Gold Winner	Silver Winner	Bronze Winner
Best Graphic Novel/Comic Book	Ashoka: The Mauryan Emperor (Campfire Graphic Novels)	Shakti (Amar Chitra Katha)	Shaitan (Holy Cow Entertainment)
Best Penciller/Inker or Penciller/Inker Team	Rajesh Nagulakonda, Ashoka: The Mauryan Emperor	Harsho Mohan Chattoraj, Shaitan (Vol. 5)	Abhijeet Kini, Rhyme Fighters (Vol. 3)
Best Writer	Tripti Nainwal, APJ Abdul Kalam	Anupam Arunachalam, Ashoka: The Mauryan Emperor	1. Zafar Khurshid & Akshay Dhar, Holy Hell (Vol. 5); 2. Ashwin Kalmane, Aadhira Mohi (Vol. 1)
Best Web Comic	Bakarmax	Brown Paperbag	The Circus
Best Colorist	Vijay Sharma & Pradeep Sherawat, Ashoka: The Mauryan Emperor	Prasad Patnaik, Caster (Vol. 6)	Sumanta Dey, Machher Jhol
Best Children's Illustrated Book	Boondi (Scholastic India)	The Girl Who Went to the Stars (Penguin Random House India)	1. Machher Jhol (Pickle Yolk Books); 2. Nani's Walk to the Park (Pratham Books)
Best Cover	Shakti (Amar Chitra Katha)	The Cloudfarers (Penguin Random House India)	Zero: An Indian Alien's Adventure (Village Comics)
Fan Favorite Exhibitor	Planet Superheroes	The Souled Store	Wizplex India
Fan Favorite Publisher	Simon & Schuster India	Scholastic India	Penguin Random House India
Comic Con Blockbuster Exhibitor	Aswhole Ideas	Crossword Book Stores	1. Games The Shop; 2. Tee Story
Comic Con India Special Award	Raj Comics		

Comic Con India Awards 2018

Categories	Gold Winner	Silver Winner	Bronze Winner
Best Graphic Novel/Comic Book	Buddha: An Enlightened Life (Campfire Graphic Novels)	The Age of Immortals (Holy Cow Entertainment)	Holy Hell (Vol. 4) (Meta Desi Comics)
Best Penciller/Inker or Penciller/Inker Team	Saumin Patel, The Age of Immortals	Rajesh Nagulakonda, Buddha: An Enlightened Life	Abhijeet Kini, Rhyme Fighters & Holy Hell (Vol. 4)
Best Writer	Akshay Dhar & Zafar Khurshid, Holy Hell (Vol. 4)	Shamik Dasgupta, The Village	Ram V, The Age of Immortals
Best Web Comic	Brown Paperbag	Bakarmax	The Beast Legion (Vol. 13)
Best Colorist	Rajesh Nagulakonda & Pradeep Sherawat, Buddha: An Enlightened Life	Saumin Patel, The Age of Immortals	Prasad Patnaik, The Village
Best Children's Illustrated Book	The Best Baker in the World (Penguin Random House India)	1. Potli Baba Ki Kahani: Pinnochio (Scholastic India); 2. Shah Jahan & The Ruby Robber (Duckbill Books)	Wingstar No.1 (Tinkle Comics)
Best Cover	The Village (Yali Dream Creations)	The Age of Immortals (Holy Cow Entertainment)	Space Junkies (Vol. 2) (SK Comics)
Best Continuing Graphic Series	Holy Hell (Meta Desi Comics)	Wingstar (Tinkle Magazine)	NOIS Series (Tinkle Magazine)
Best New Penciller/Inker or Penciller/Inker Team	Tadam Gayadu, Damned	Abhilash Panda, Rakshak	
Fan Favorite Exhibitor	Planet Superheroes	MC Sid Razz	Every Flavour Geeks
Fan Favorite Publisher	Penguin Random House India	Simon & Schuster India	Amar Chitra Katha

Comic Con India Awards 2017

Comic Con India Awards 2016

Comic Con India Awards 2015

Comic Con India Awards 2014

Comic Con India Awards 2013

Categories	Winner
Best Graphic Novel/Comic Book	Gandhi: My Life Is My Message (Campfire Graphic Novels)
Best Penciller/Inker or Penciller/Inker Team	Naresh Kumar, Julius Caesar
Best Writer	Jason Quinn, Gandhi: My Life Is My Message
Best Children's Writer	Soyna Owley, The Magic of Hobson Jobson
Best Colorist	1. Yogesh Pugaonkar, Ravanayan Finale Part 1; 2. Sachin Nagar, Vijay Sharma & Pradeep Sherawat, Gandhi: My Life Is My Message
Best Children's Illustrated Book	The Story and the Song (Karadi Tales)
Best Cover	I am Kalki: The Black Book (Vol. 3) (Vimanika Comics)
Best Continuing Graphic Series	Mos Queeto (Tinkle Digest)
Comic Con India Special Award	Tinkle Magazine
Lifetime Achievement Award	Pran

Comic Con India Awards 2012

Comic Con India Awards 2011

Categories	Winner
Best Graphic Novel/Comic Book	Nelson Mandela (Campfire Graphic Novels)
Best Writer	Suhas Sundar, Odayan Volume 1 (Level 10 Comics)
Best Web Comic	The Beast Legion
Best Artist	Amit Tayal, The Jungle Book
Best Children's Illustrated Book	Tinkle Holiday Special 37
Best Cover	I am Kalki: The Silver Book (Vol. 1 ) (Vimanika Comics)
Best Unpublished Work	Satya Police
Best Retailer	Flipkart
Lifetime Achievement Award	R. K. Laxman

== Gallery ==
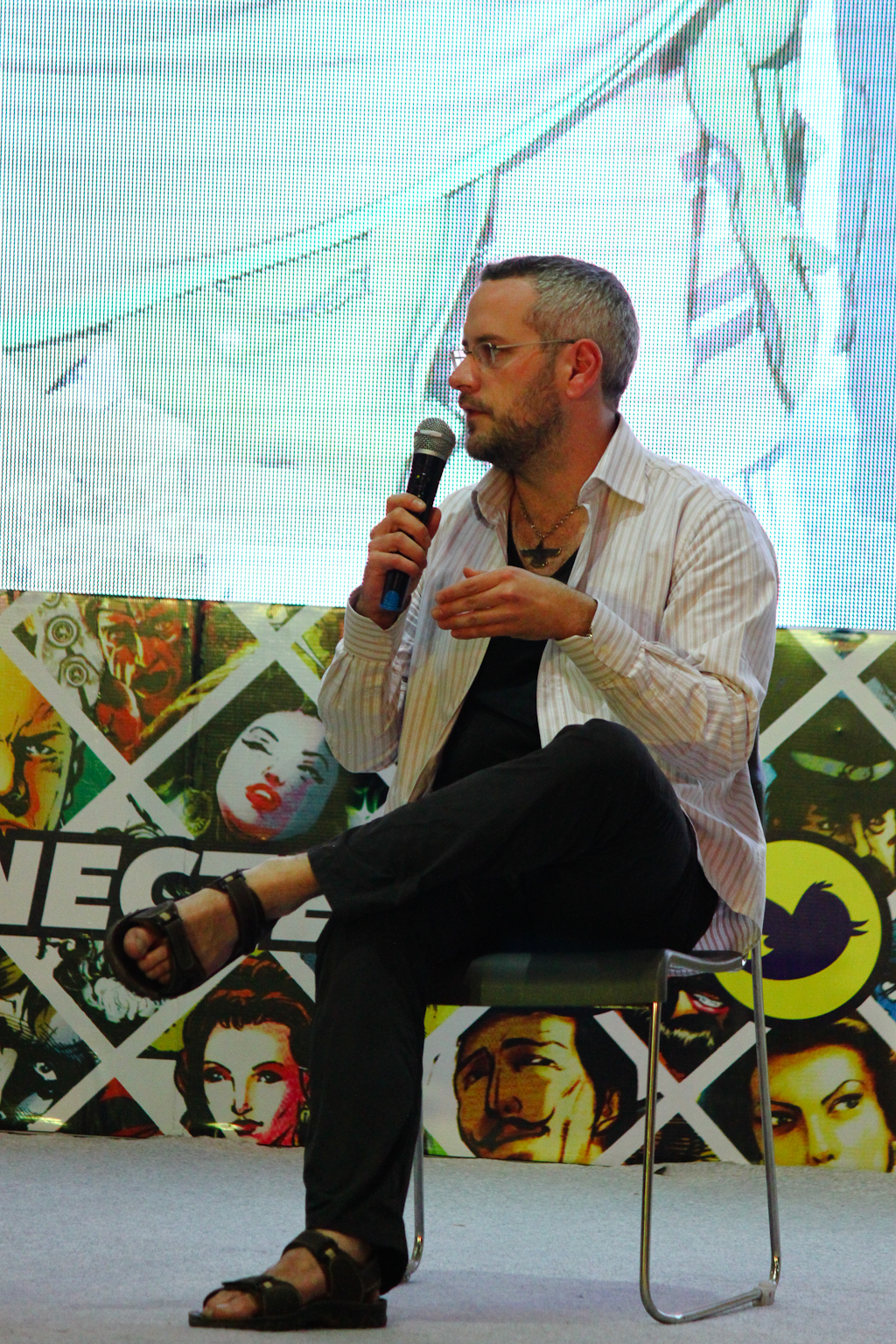
Nicholas Wild, graphic novel artist

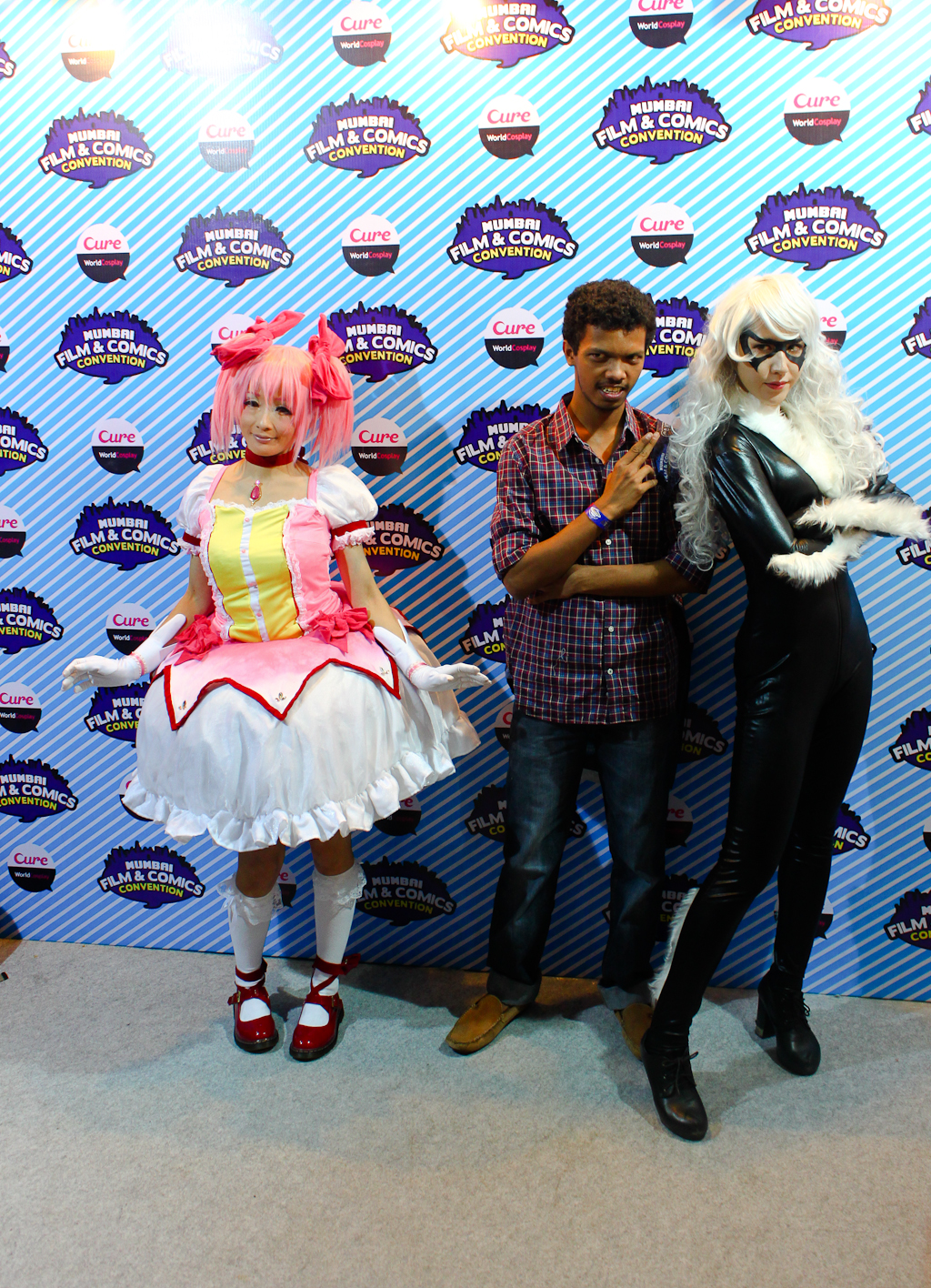
Professional cosplayers Miya and Aika Shiguma with a fan

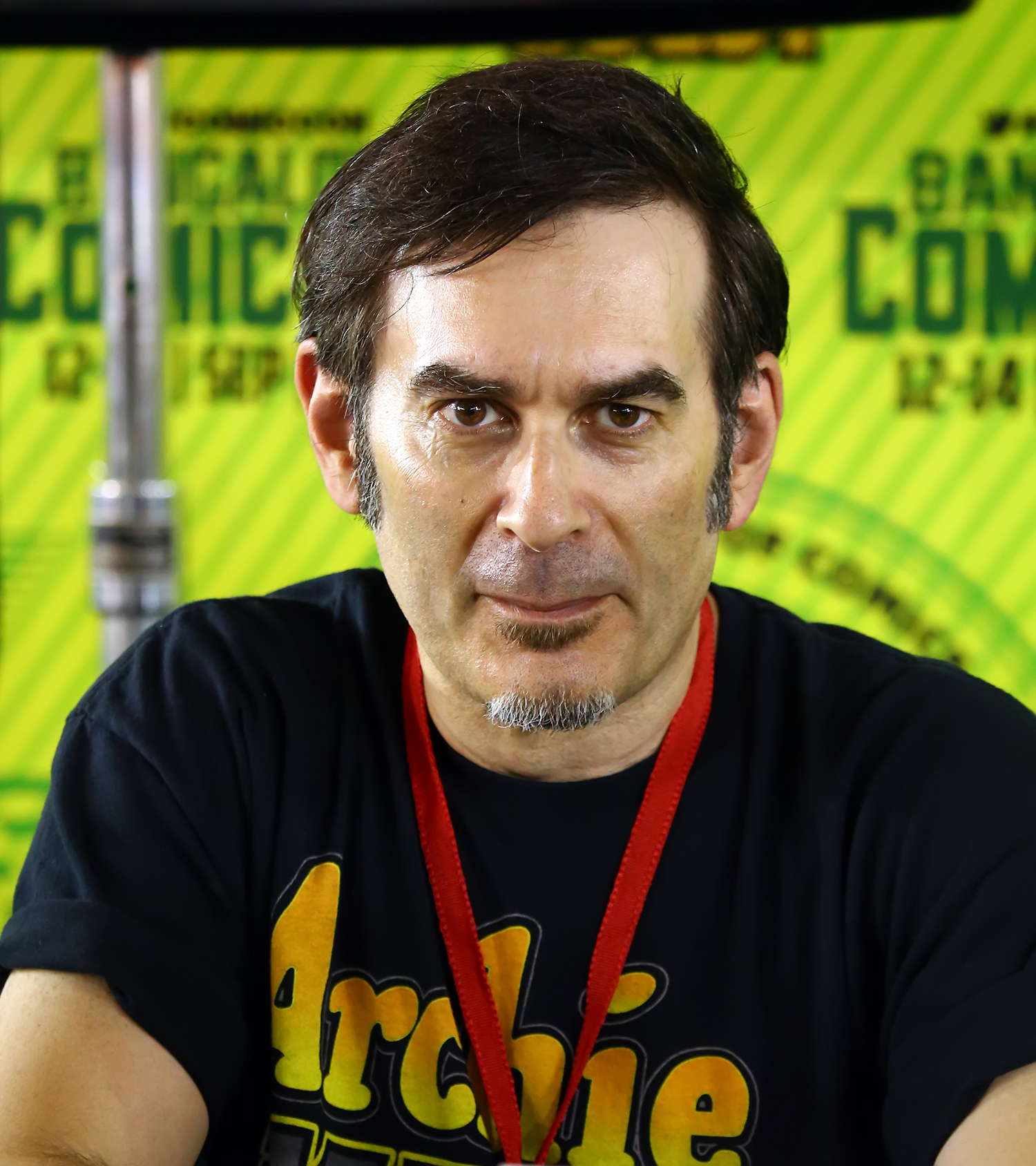
Dan Parent at Bangalore Comic Con 2014

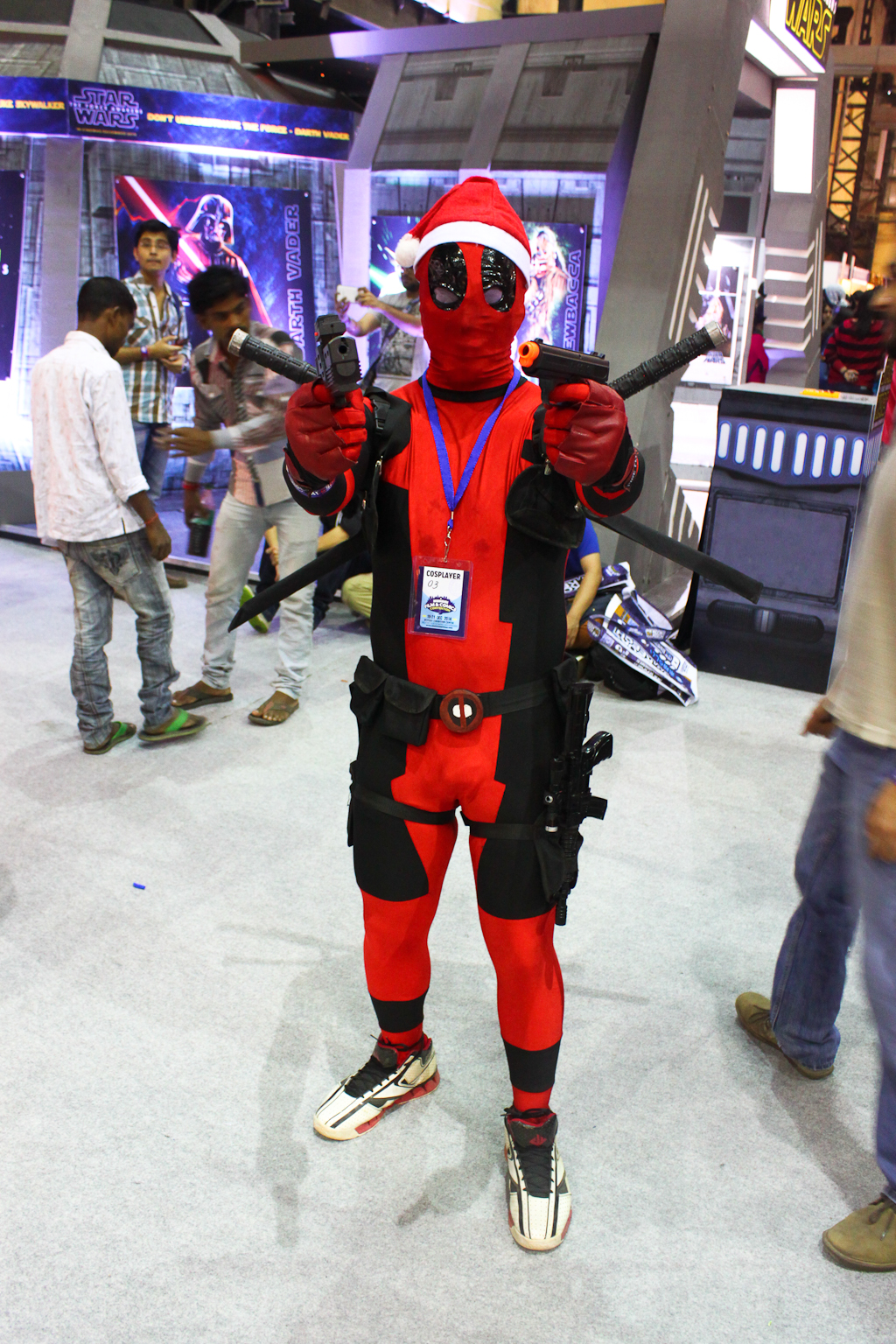
Deadpool cosplay at Mumbai Comic Con 2014

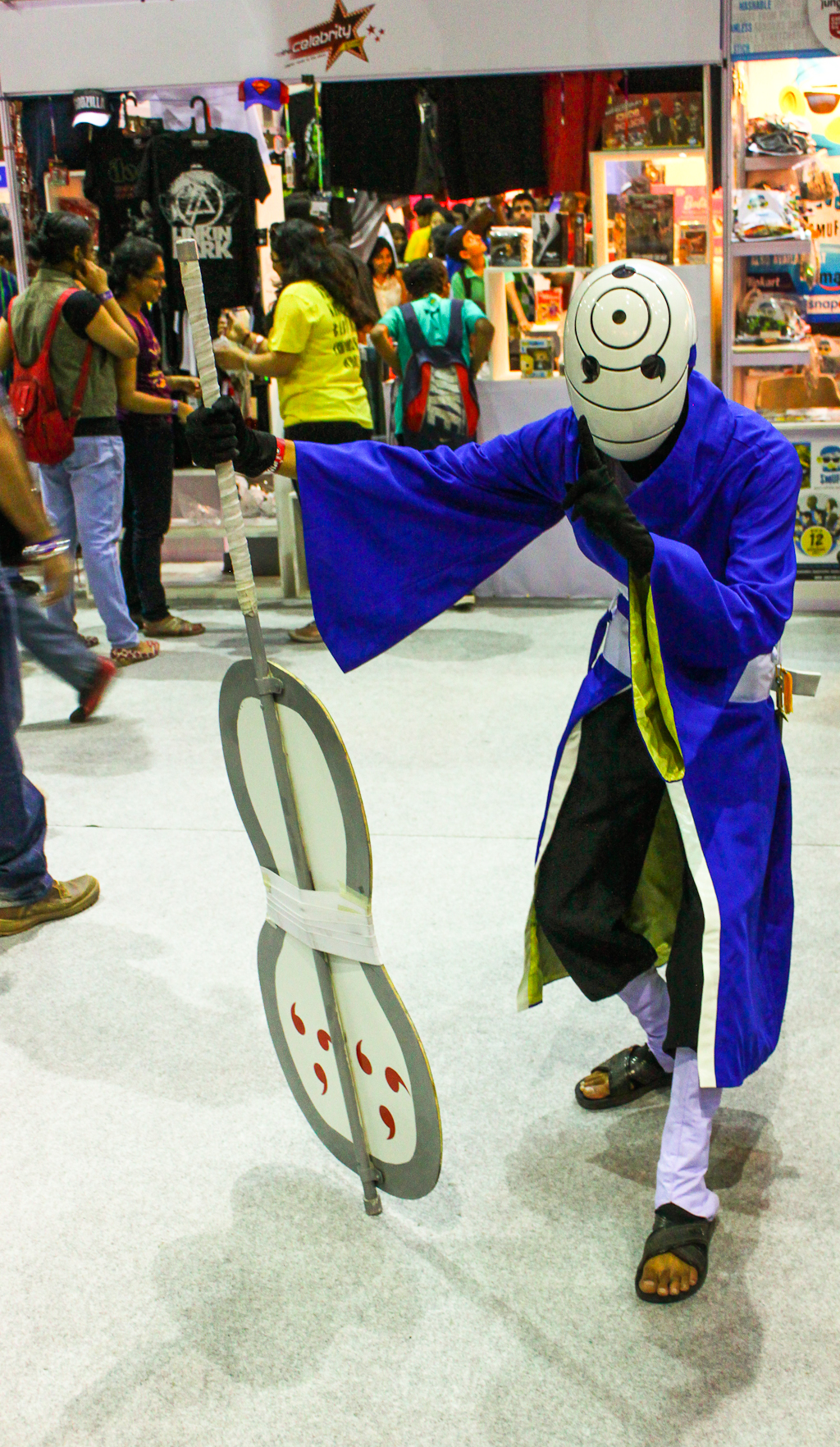
Obito cosplay from Naruto at Mumbai Comic Con 2014.

== See also ==
- Comics Fest India
