= Izzat Nagar =

- Neighbourhood
- Interactive map of Izzat Nagar
- Coordinates: 17°28′15″N 78°22′46″E
- Country: India
- State: Telangana
- District: Rangareddy
- Metro: Hyderabad

Government
  - Body: GHMC

Languages
  - Official: Telugu
- Time zone: UTC+5:30 (IST)
- PIN: 500 084
- Vehicle registration: TG
- Lok Sabha constituency: Malkajgiri
- Vidhan Sabha constituency: Serilingampally
- Planning agency: GHMC
- Website: telangana.gov.in

Izzat Nagar is a suburb close to the IT hub of Hyderabad, India.

== Transport ==
It is connected by buses run by TSRTC.

The closest MMTS train station is at HITEC city. Landmark beside Hyundai research and development center Hyundai, R&D.

== See also ==
- Madhapur
- Kukatpally
- Bachupally
- Mallampet
- Bowrampet
