= Bowrampet =

- Neighbourhood
- Country: India
- State: Telangana
- District: Medchal
- Metro: Hyderabad

Government
  - Body: Dundigal Municipality

Languages
  - Official: Telugu
- Time zone: UTC+5:30 (IST)
- PIN: 500043
- Vehicle registration: TG
- Lok Sabha constituency: Malkajgiri
- Vidhan Sabha constituency: Quthbullapur
- Planning agency: GHMC
- Civic agency: GHMC
- Website: telangana.gov.in

Bowrampet also Borampet is a village in Medchal district, Telangana, India. It is a part of Dundigal Municipality. The village is fast developing into a major residential and commercial suburb because of the construction of the Outer Ring Road, proximity to the IT corridor of Hyderabad and pollution-free environs. In the past few years realty prices have gone up drastically and is becoming a destination to the cream of the employees from the IT and Education sectors.

It is 8 km from Jawaharlal Nehru Technological University, Hyderabad and Kukatpally, 10 km from Miyapur X roads, 12 km from Madhapur and 3 km from Bachupally.

== Outer Ring Road ==
The 159 km Outer Ring Road, Hyderabad has an Exit (Mallampet Exit 4A) near Bowrampet. The 100 feet road work started here to cater the traffic to/from the exit and is under progress.This has led to growth in real estate activity with many residential and commercial ventures coming up in the vicinity. ORR significantly reduced the distance, travel time and access to different parts of the city. Gachibowli and Ghatkesar are about 40 min drive from Bowrampet through the ORR.

=== Residential projects ===
Gated communities like Garuda Royale, Elite Park, Djs homes ( akshayas fortune heights ), Praneeth Pranav Meadows, Sri Avani Projects, Dollar Dreams, Dollar Meadows, SRR Heights with 99-houses community, RNG Infra Supra Avenue, Keerthi Homes, Tripura Landmark, Sri Sai Residency, Sri Venkateshwara Heights, Durga Vihar gated Villas, Gokul's Brindavanam, SRK Green Park, GOTHIC Infra's Pinnacle, Photon, Vajra Builders and Developers' prestigious project of Nature City (Gated community of 66 Villas) and The Royal Park (Gated community - Apartments) is in full swing, with Nature City almost coming to the end of completion and Puravidha are all located here.

Amsri, a realty group, is proposing 260-acre (1.1 km^{2}) integrated residential gated community, adjacent to Outer Ring Road, called as Amsri Global Village. Mantri Realty, a Mumbai-based realty company is planning two residential complexes comprising 800 apartments.

Rajiv Swagruha, a state-government project for providing houses to the middle class, has its project here.

== Commercial area ==
Makuta's Multiplex is about to setup in Bowrampet area in near future. A public sector bank, SBH, has its branch here. Bowrampet is also home for Incub8 which is a Startup Incubator. Several private companies such as Edvenswa Tech, Edvenswa EPC, INLINE4 Engineering, Vanaha Essentials, Edvenswa Pharmaceuticals, etc. have their registered offices in Bowrampet. It is close to Bachupally, which is a major hub for shopping and big commercial establishments.

== Schools ==
Bowrampet is a hub for International Schools. Schools like Oakridge International School, a leading IB school, has 15-acre (61,000 m^{2}) campus. Silver Oaks International School is another leading IB school in Bowrampet. Delhi Public School (DPS), Laurus - the Universal school (4-acre campus), Ambitus world School, Unicent International School, Geethanjali International School, Shantiniketan International School, Five Elements International School, Shikhara School, The Creek Planet School - Mercury Campus, Sri Vatsal Gurukul Vidyalaya, Sriveda Universe - The School, Vvyasa School, Pallavi International School, Academic Heights International School, Pragathi Central School, Slate - The School, Gayathri Vidya Layam, Nextgen School with 3 branches (Pragathi Nagar and Bowrampet) etc have their campuses in Bowrampet. Other schools around are Kennedy High, Vikas, Bhashyam, Victory Model School etc.

== Hospitals ==
Bowrampet has Snigdha Ayurvedic Hospital which is rated highly since it started operating in February 2020.

== Colleges ==
An engineering college, DRK Institute of Science and Technology is located on a 10-acre (40,000 m^{2}) campus. Sri Chaitanya IAS academy, Sri Chaitanya Jr. college(BiPC), Sri Chaitanya Boys Hostel, Sri Chaitanya IIT Academy(Boys hostel), Impulse IIT Academy. Other engineering colleges around are VNR Vignana Jyothi (VNRVJIET), JNTU campus, Gokaraju Rangaraju, Mallareddy. It is close to institutes like Sri Chaitanya Academy for Intermediate education, Sri Vidya College of Education. The AP Police is setting up Rangreddy district police training centre here.

Arts Academy

Bhramari kuchipudi dance and arts academy is located near Tripura landmark-2 which provides classical kuchipudi dance and arts regular classes and certifications.

== Transport ==
Bowrampet is well-connected by TSRTC buses to the city, the routes are:

- 272 To Secunderabad Stn (via Gandimaisamma, Jeedimetla, Balanagar, Patny)
- 272 J/B To Secunderabad Stn (via Gandimaisamma, Jeedimetla, Balanagar, Jubilee Bus station)
- 272 K To Balanagar, ESI (via Gandimaisamma, Jeedimetla)
- 272 C To Shalibanda (via Gandimaisamma, Suraram, Moosapet, Nampally, Aliabad) .

The closest MMTS station, for local trains, is 8 kilometers away at KPHB colony. A new station for Metro rail is proposed at Miyapur.

== Villages and suburbs around Bowrampet ==
Mallampet, Bachupally, Nizampet, Kukatpally
