= Mallampet =

- neighbourhood
- Location in Telangana, India Mallampet (Telangana) Mallampet (India)
- Coordinates: 17°33′0.72″N 78°20′9.24″E
- Country: India
- State: Telangana
- District: Ranga Reddy/Cyberabad
- Metro: Hyderabad Metropolitan Region

Government
  - Body: GHMC

Languages
  - Official: Telugu
- Time zone: UTC+5:30 (IST)
- PIN: 500 090
- Vehicle registration: TG
- Lok Sabha constituency: Malkajgiri
- Vidhan Sabha constituency: Qutubullapur
- Planning agency: GHMC
- Civic agency: GHMC
- Website: telangana.gov.in

Mallampet is situated in GHMC and at Dundigal Gandimaisamma Mandal, Medchal district, Telangana, India. It is 2 km from Bachupally, 6 km from Nizampet junction, 10 km away from Kukatpally.

== Commercial area ==
Mallampet is a fast growing area in GHMC. It is very close to trading areas like Bachupally, Nizampet Miyapur Kukatpally, which are big shopping hubs. Mallampet is about 5 mins from Bachupally, 15 mins from Miyapur and 45 mins distance from Hitech City. The village is in close proximity to top engineering and residential junior colleges.

== Outer Ring Road ==
The 159-kilometer Outer Ring Road of Hyderabad is passing through and an Exit located at Mallampet(Exit No 4A). It is a 6-lane, 500-feet wide road. This has led to growth in real estate activity with many residential ventures coming up in Bachupally. It has significantly reduced the distance, travel time and access to different parts of the city. The Praneeth Pranav Gems Gated Community (Independent/Duplex Villas) is located in Mallampet, adjacent to ORR. A Praneeth Pranav Leaf villa project with 500+ picturesque villas, and GLC Bhavanas Cribs Project with 300+ Villas and APR Signator Villas around 150 + situated in Mallampet. Dream Valley, Green Park, Balaji Layouts are also situated with many house holds.

== Schools and Temples ==
Mallampet is near to lot of schools and colleges. Schools like Oakridge, Sentia, Kennedy High, Creek, Gitanjali, Pallavi International, Silver Oaks and colleges like Narayana, Chaitanya and Vignan Jyothi are in and around Bachupally. There is a Pochamma Temple in the heart of Mallampet.

== Areas around Mallampet ==
- Bachupally
- Nizampet
- IDA Bollaram
- Miyapur
- Bollaram
- Bowrampet
- Shambipur
