= Suraram =

Suraram may refer to:

- Suraram, Ranga Reddy district, a colony in Ranga Reddy district, Telangana, India
- Suraram, Nalgonda district, a village in Nalgonda district, Telangana, India
