= Karadi Tales =

Indian children's publishing house

Karadi Tales Company Pvt Ltd.
- Karadi Tales Company Logo
- Industry: Publishing, Internet, Television, Animation
- Founded: 1996
- Headquarters: Chennai, Tamil Nadu, India
- Key people: C. P. Viswanath, Managing Director Narayan Parasuram, Creative Director Shobha Viswanath, Creative Director
- Products: Picture Books, Audio Books, Board Books, Tactile Books
- Website: www.karaditales.com

Karadi Tales is an independent children's publishing house based in Chennai, India focusing primarily on picture books and audiobooks. It was started in 1996 with an intent to create a space for Indian culture in the world of children's publishing, by a group of writers, educators and musicians. Since its launch, Karadi Tales titles have been consistently one of the largest selling publications in India. Many titles have sold more than 100,000 copies and most titles have crossed 20,000 copies. The audiobooks are narrated by a roster of celebrities and set to classical Indian ragas which are performed by trained musicians.

In 2010, the Karadi Path Education Company was founded. It is an offshoot of Karadi Tales.

== Concept ==
Karadi (which in Kannada, Malayalam, Tamil etc. means 'bear') is a bear who tells stories from his life.

The first voice of Karadi the bear was the acclaimed Indian actor Naseeruddin Shah.

== Series ==
=== Picture books ===
Karadi Tales picture books for kids cover a wide range of topics such as gender, stories about the environment, animal stories, Indian folktales, stories about kindness, and concept books on counting, colours and shapes.

Authored by gifted writers they feature stunning illustrations in a variety of styles including Indian folk art like Warli, Gond and Madhubani.

==== Folktales ====
This series feature folktales from different parts of India. With illustrations and music representative of the region, these stories form a complete cultural experience of different parts of India. The initial four folktales in this series from Rajasthan, Tamil Nadu, West Bengal and Bihar were narrated by Usha Uthup. The mantle of sootradhar and storyteller has now been taken over by Nandita Das.

==== Bilingual Picture Books ====
Popular books from around the world in bilingual English/Hindi and English/Tamil editions to promote multilingual learning among children. These include books of Eric Carle, the best-selling author of The Very Hungry Caterpillar.

==== Board Books ====
Karadi Tales publishes board books for babies. The series has one title so far, called One Rainy Day.

=== Audiobooks ===
==== Karadi Tales Mythology ====
Karadi brings to life a world of gods and demons, kings and queens, a universe of times past. Stories from Indian mythology are woven together and sung by Award winner and celebrated film and theatre personality Girish Karnad, who plays the role of Karadi, the bear and sootradhar. The script, lyrics and direction is by Shobha Viswanath. Thota Tharani adapts his unique style to communicate art to children, which exposes children to illustrations that are not childish, yet are appealing to the child. Like the art, the music steers away from the childish nursery rhyme format and incorporates Indian aesthetics. The acclaimed group, '3 Brothers & A Violin' have created the songs and background scores for the audiobooks.

==== Charkha Audiobooks ====
Charkha Audiobooks presents biographies and Indian classics for young adults. Mahatma Gandhi, Dalai Lama and A.P.J Abdul Kalam are some of the eminent personalities whose biographies have been adapted for this series.

==== Will You Read With Me? series ====
The 'Will You Read With Me?' series is a personal invitation to all children to read along with their favourite icons. Each narrator takes the child through a delightful visual and auditory journey, as they simultaneously listen to the story while browsing through the clever and quirky illustrations in the books. Narrators and musicians for this series include well-known personalities such as Girish Karnad, Naseeruddin Shah, Vidya Balan, Soha Ali Khan, Rahul Dravid, and Javed Jaffery.

==== The Mouse Series ====
The Mouse series is a series of four books featuring the character 'Mouse' narrated by Karthik Kumar with music by Anil Srinivasan.

==== Karadi Rhymes ====
Featuring Indian rhymes for Indian kids, these rhymes are set to simple Indian ragas. The rhymes are sung by Usha Uthup.

=== Tactile Books ===
Karadi Tales has two tactile books for preschoolers – ABC Touch and See and The Very Hungry Caterpillar.

== Translation Rights ==
Karadi Tales picture books have also sold translation rights all over the world, with editions in Thai, Chinese, Bahasa, German, French, Japanese, Portuguese, Italian, Nepali, and Spanish.

== Television ==
A 26-episode animated series premiered on 5 April 2010 on Disney Channel India, directed by Soumitra Ranade. Animated characters and backgrounds are uniquely stylized along the lines of the Indian mask-making tradition, which gives the series a distinct look and feel that is sophisticated and very Indian.

== Animation ==
The Karadi Tales Animation episodes feature stories from Indian folklore. The character design is based on the rich visual traditions of India and rendered in a unique animation style inspired by Indian mask making and puppetry cultures and textured with vibrant music and songs.

== Awards and recognition ==
Karadi Tales has received several national and international accolades such as The Hindu Young World Goodbooks Awards, the Dr Toy Award, the NAPPA Award, the Jarul Children’s Choice Award (three years in a row), the Comic Con India Award, and the South Asian Book Award. Regularly reviewed by Kirkus Reviews, School Library Journal, Publishers Weekly and Brain Pickings; their titles can be found in many prestigious lists such as White Ravens, International Board on Books for Young People, the New York Public Library’s Best Children’s Books, the Dolly Parton Imagination Library Program, and more.

Karadi Tales was also shortlisted for the Best Publisher Award (Asia) at the Bologna Children’s Book Fair in 2017, and in 2019 for the International Excellence Awards for publishers at the London Book Fair, in the category ‘Audiobook Publisher of the Year’.
