= People's Hospital, Pragathi Nagar =

People's Hospital, Pragathi Nagar is a specialty hospital run under the management of People's Progress Trust and situated at Pragathi Nagar Panjayath. It started its operation in its current location in 2007. The hospital shifted to its new multi-complex building in the year 2010 and started its operations as a Multy speciality Hospital. This hospital is known for its low cost healthcare services and access to lower and middle income group within the adjacent localities. The hospital has other facilities attached to it such as: pharmacy X-ray, clinical laboratory etc.

Prgathi Central School is a CBSE public school under the same management which is located about 0.5 km from the hospital campus.

== Departments ==
- General Medicine
- Gynaecology & Obstetrics
- Paediatrics
- Orthopaedics
- General Surgery
- Gastroenterology
- urology
- Plastic surgery
- Neurology
- ENT
- Surgical gastroenterology
- Oncology
- Cardiology
- Dental
- Physiotherapy & Rehabilitation
