= Vengalrao Gottimukula =

Indian politician

G.Vengal Rao
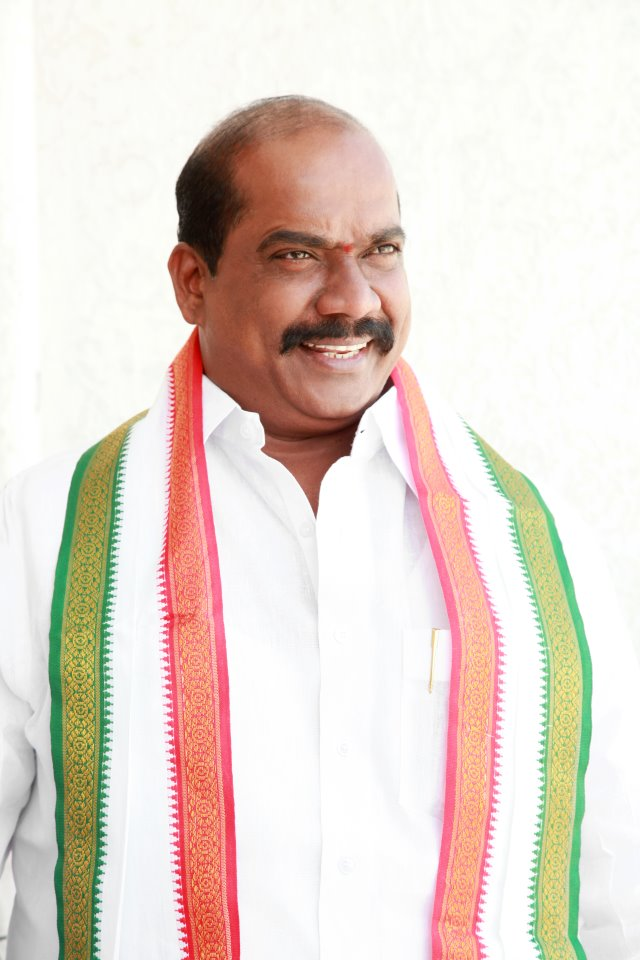

G.H.M.C Kukatpally Division corporator
- Incumbent
- Assumed office 2010
- Constituency: Kukatpally, Telangana

Personal details
- Born: 27 November 1960 (age 65) Kukatpally, Telangana, India
- Party: Indian National Congress

Vengal Rao Gottimukula (born 27 November 1960) is an Indian politician belonging to the Indian National Congress.

== Political career ==
Vengal Rao Gottimukula was elected from the Kukatpally Division in 2010, and was the member of Standing committee.
