= Sufi Comics =

Indian comic book publisher

- Type: Private
- Industry: Publishing
- Founded: 2009
- Headquarters: Bangalore, India
- Key people: Mohammad Arif Vakil, Mohammad Ali Vakil
- Products: Comics
- Parent: Sufi Studios
- Website: http://www.suficomics.com

Sufi Comics or Sufi Studios is a Bangalore based Indian comic book publisher. In 2012 it was the first Indian publisher ever to participate at San Diego Comic-Con.

== Comics ==
They have, as of now, published two comics:

- first comic book titled "40 Sufi Comics". The book has been translated into 7 languages including French, German, Indonesian, Norwegian, Russian, Spanish and Tamil.
- second comic book titled "The Wise Fool of Baghdad" with artist Rahil Mohsin
- third comic book titled "Rumi Vol.1" with artist Rahil Mohsin

The authors of both comics are Mohammed Ali Vakil and Mohammed Arif Vakil. While the first book was written and illustrated by the brothers, the brothers teamed up with Rahil Mohsin, who illustrated the Wise Fool of Baghdad. The comics are short stories taken from Islamic history to illustrate the eternal spiritual truths in the teachings of Islam. They are working on 300 plus pages graphic novel on poems of Sufi poet Rumi.

== Events ==
Sufi comics took part in following comics events:

- Mumbai Comic Con India 2011 (Express), where they released their first comic book titled, "40 Sufi Comics"
- Delhi Comic Con India 2012, where they were nominated "Best Web/Digital Comic" and "Best Graphic Anthology" categories
- San Diego Comic-Con 2012
- Bangalore Comic Con 2012 (Express), where they released their second comic book titled, "The Wise Fool of Baghdad"
  - On 28 July Comic Con India in association with Mocha (Coffees & Conversations) organised a "Special Session With Sufi Comics" was organized as a setting-stage event for Comic Con Express Bengaluru
- Mumbai film and Comic Convention 2012, where they launched their second comic book titled, "The Wise Fool of Baghdad"
- Free Comic Book Weekend 2013
- Bangalore Comic Con 2013

=== Gallery ===
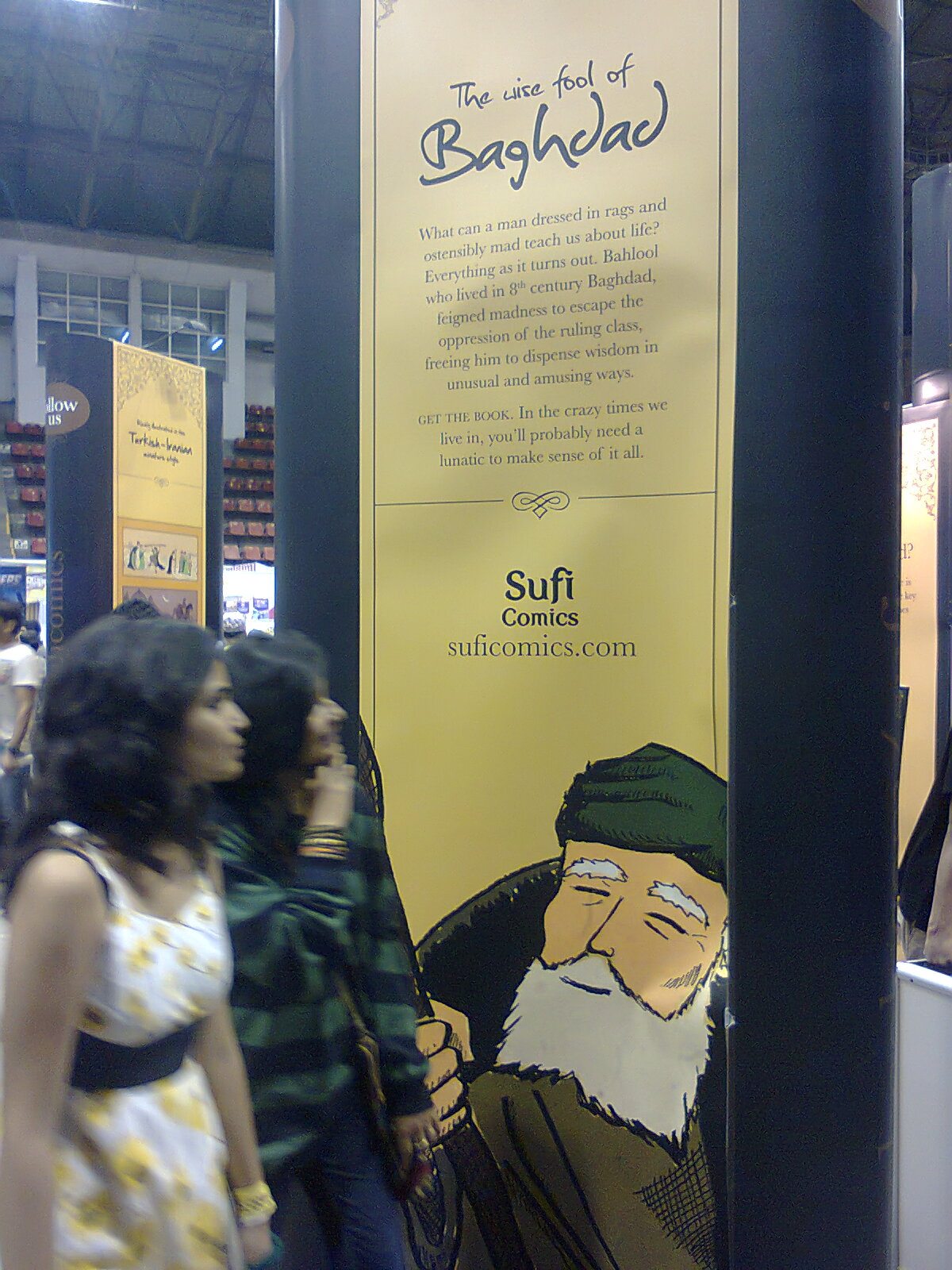
Sufi Comics at Bangalore Comic Con 2012

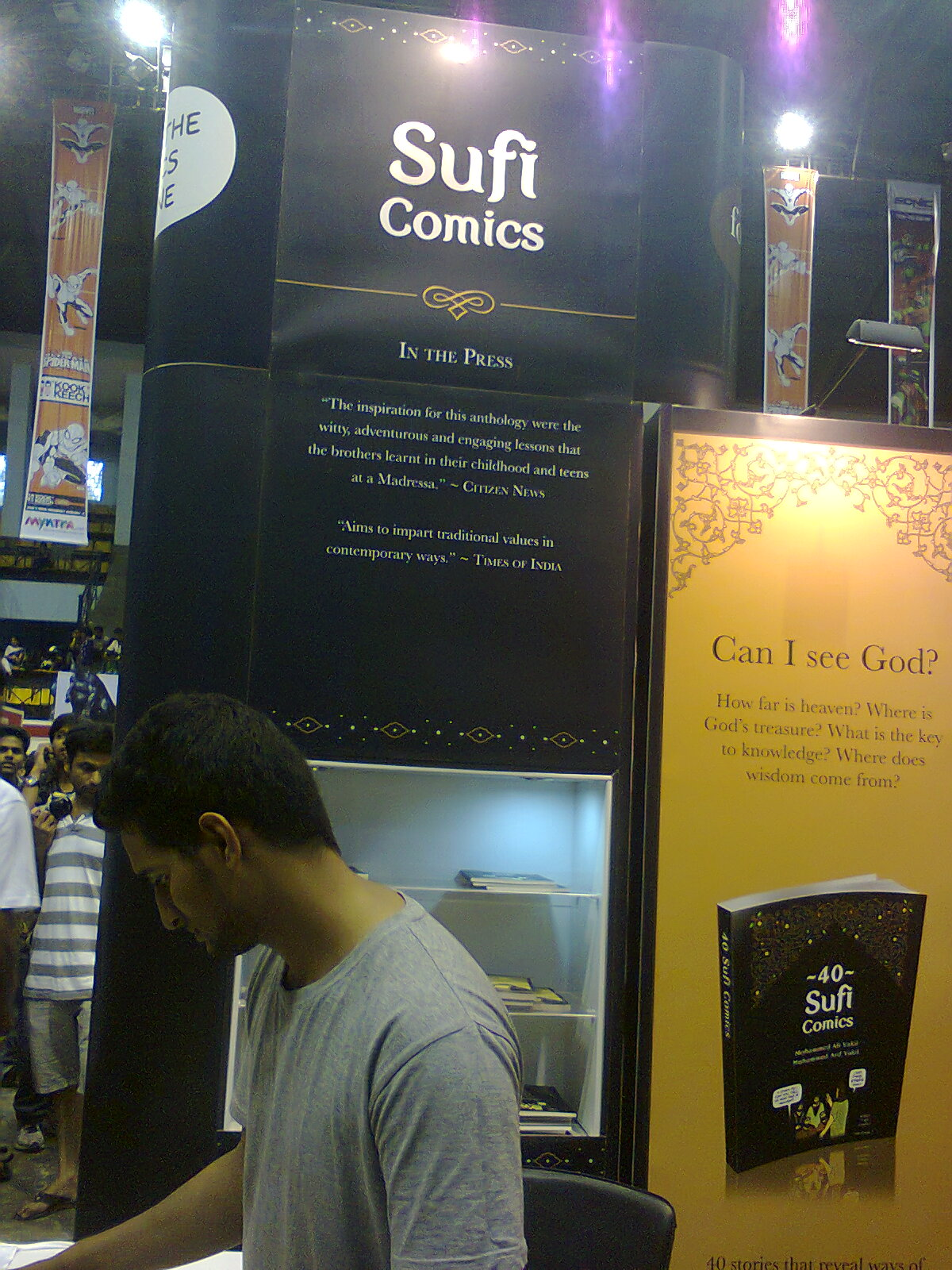
Sufi Comics at Bangalore Comic Con 2013
