= Ravanayan =

Ravanayan is a ten-part comic series based on the Hindu epic Ramayana released by Holy Cow Entertainment in July 2011, told from the perspective of Ravana. Its creators are Mumbai-based artist Vivek Goel and Mumbai-based writer Vijayendra "Vimoh" Mohanty.

== Overview ==
Ravanayan is divided into twelve chapters spread over ten issues. It is an imaginative take on the life of Ravana, the antagonist of Ramayana. Ravanayan is an independent 10- chapter (7 issue) comic book series project being undertaken by Vijayendra Mohanty (writer) and Vivek Goel (artist).

== Characters and contents ==
Apart from Ravana being the chief protagonist instead of Rama, Ravanayan departs from Ramayana in other ways. The creators of Ravanayan address Ravana with the honorific title of 'Lord' because, as they reason out, his kingdom had flourished under his able rule. Physical appearance of most characters has also been re-imagined. Ravana has been depicted as "handsome, muscular man with flowing locks of white hair ... He is also clean-shaven, without the 'clichéd, ugly moustache'" which is traditionally used to depict any asura. Most prominently, Ravana, as is the case with popular depictions, has not been shown with ten heads, but instead, the ten qualities that each of the heads stood for have been incorporated in his personality. Again in contrast with the original Ramayana, creators have focused less on characters related to Rama and more on those related to Ravana. They have made an attempt in the second chapter to explain how a small incident gave glimpses of future personality of the three brothers – Kumbhakarna, Vibhishana and Ravana.

== Research for the project ==
The creators had consulted Valmiki's original Ramayana, and apart from that Arshia Sattar, Devdutt Pattanaik, Penguin Books' Guide to Ramayana. The creators have also used their imagination to re-interpret the characters.

== See also ==
- Ramayana
- Ravana
- Rama
