= Nizampet =

- suburb
- Location in Telangana, India Nizampet (Telangana) Nizampet (India)
- Coordinates: 17.519748°N 78.377648°E
- Country: India
- State: Telangana
- District: Medchal-Malkajgiri
- Metro: Hyderabad

Government
  - Type: Municipal Corporation
  - Body: Cyberabad Municipal Corporation
  - Mayor: Kolan Neela Reddy

Area
  - Total: 23.44 km^{2} (9.05 sq mi)

Population (2011)
  - Total: 48,835
  - Estimate (2019): 370,114
  - Density: 2,083/km^{2} (5,396/sq mi)

Languages
  - Official: Telugu
- Time zone: UTC+5:30 (IST)
- PIN: 500090
- Vehicle registration: TG
- Parliament constituency: Malkajgiri
- Assembly constituency: Quthbullapur
- Planning agency: HMDA
- Website: nizampetmunicipality.telangana.gov.in

Nizampet is a satellite city of Hyderabad and a municipal corporation situated in Bachupally mandal, Medchal-Malkajgiri district of Telangana, India. Till 2025, It was administered as Nizampet Municipal Corporation. Nizampet is now part of the Cyberabad Municipal Corporation, after merger of 27 urban local bodies into GHMC.

Nizampet lies to the northwestern end of Hyderabad City. It is one of the fastest-growing suburbs around the IT corridor of Hyderabad, because of its affordability and relatively pollution-free environment and despite its water scarcity. In 2018, the government provided municipal water to the area which caused prices to rise.

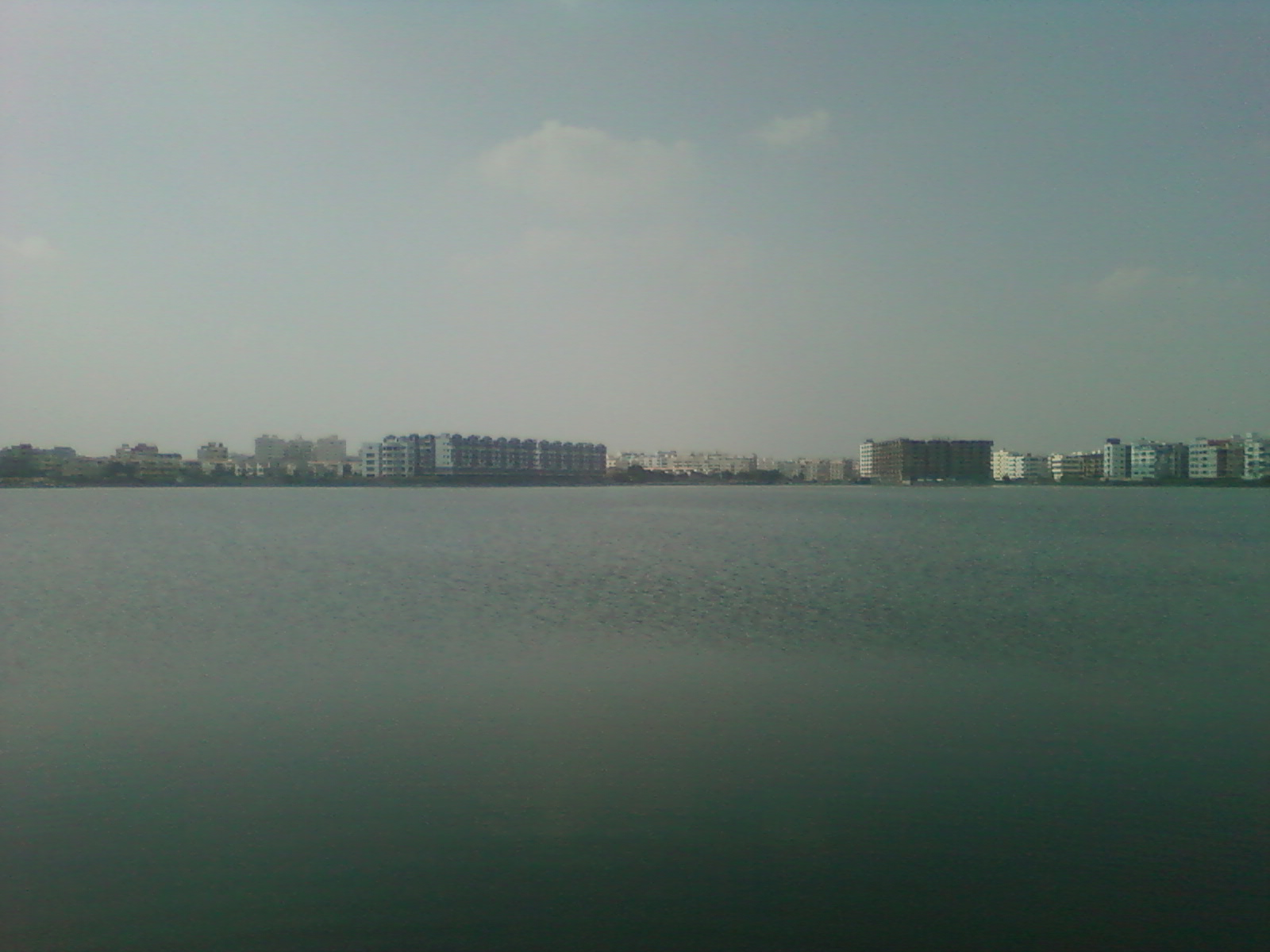
Pragatinagar lake near Nizampet in Rangareddy district

This place is surrounded by several giant constructions including over 20,000 flats and few villas. There are many colonies in this place where houses and flats are built independently. Because of the silent and upcoming townships, Nizampet has become a popular place for living and boasts a large populace of Andhra settlers

== Commercial area ==
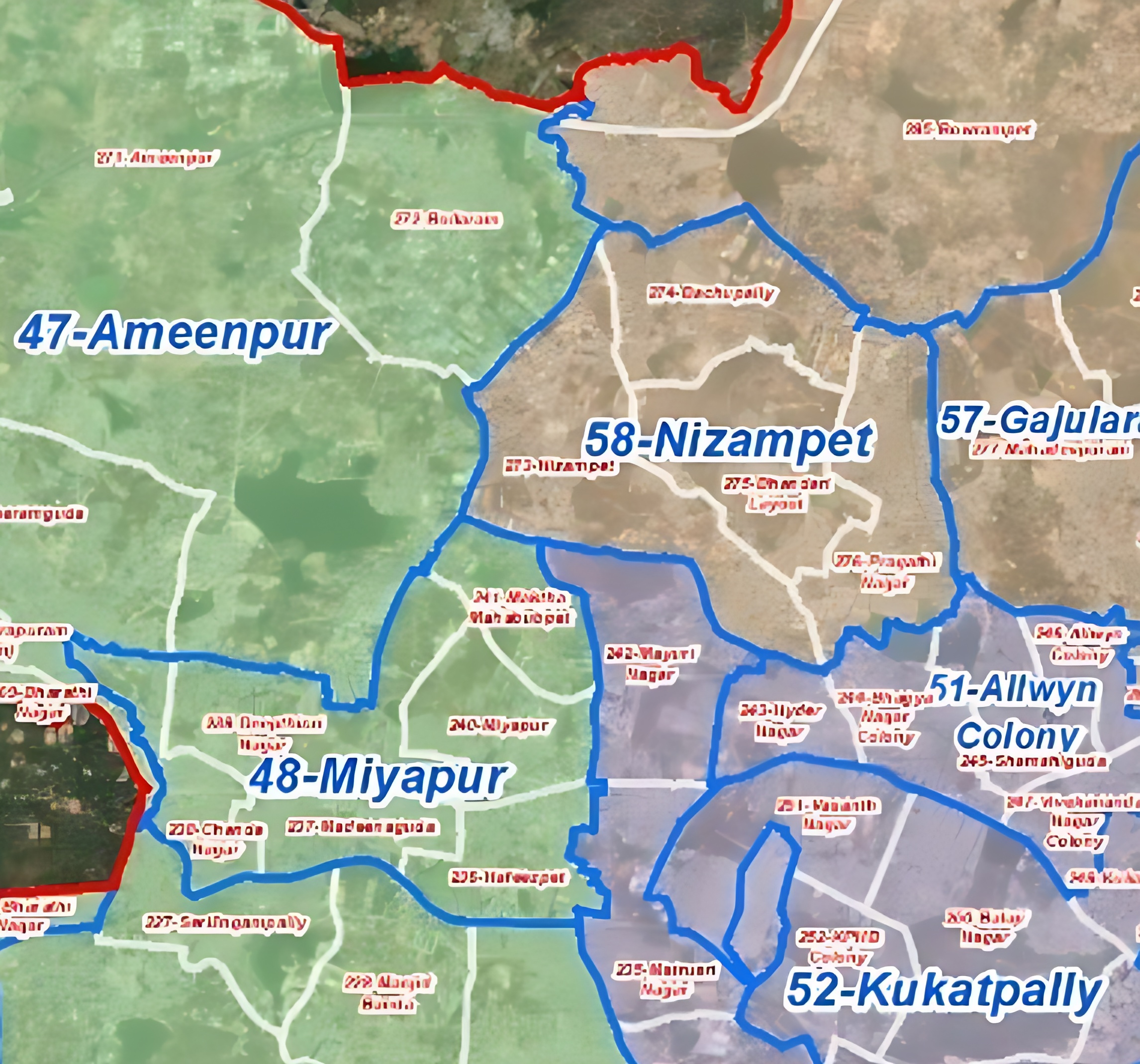
Nizampet circle map

Nizampet is close to JNTU Metro rail, Kukatpally, Bachupally and Miyapur, which are hubs for all the shops and big commercial establishments with Metro rail connectivity. There are plenty of shops and supermarkets. The area is just a 2 km away from the shopping suburb of Nizampet Village

Nizampet Road has plenty of hospitals: SLG (Bachupally-Rajivgandhi Nagar), Sri Sri Holistic Hospitals, Metro Hospital, a multiple-specialty hospital is situated in the centre of the village and the major Apollo have started clinics in the road along. There are two Apollo clinics in the Nizampet Road at 1 km, 3 km from the start, respectively. And Nest Children Hospital near Hanuman Temple.

Nizampet and Nizampet Village are considered to be a commercial hubs. There are many food and clothing shops near Hanuman Temple.

== Problems ==
Nizampet and Nizampet Village has over 20,000 apartments. Most colonies face the problem of water scarcity and residents of these colonies usually complain of dried borewells and poor Municipal water supplies. There is no MLA or Government representative in this area to take care of illegal water connections/supplies as it is a huge profitable business for them. People living at Nizampet and Nizampet Village brought this problem to Govt authorities several times but no action has been taken so far.

The roads used to be pathetic some time ago, but thanks to the proactive lead taken by the local resident groups from Nizampet and Nizampet Village, no more struggles with bad roads but except in the rainy season when the roads are flooded in many areas due to inadequate infrastructure.

Telangana Government is working on illegal constitutions made by builder, developers, leaders and local authorities. Now this concern has been with High Court, Govt. officials are awaiting for the High Court Orders to perform the action and streamline the Nizampet and Nizampet Village. HYDRAA, the cities authority which protects government properties had started rejuvenating nearby lakes thus helping with the groundwater problems faced by the local populace.

There are no water-harvesting pits at Nizampet and Nizampet Village.

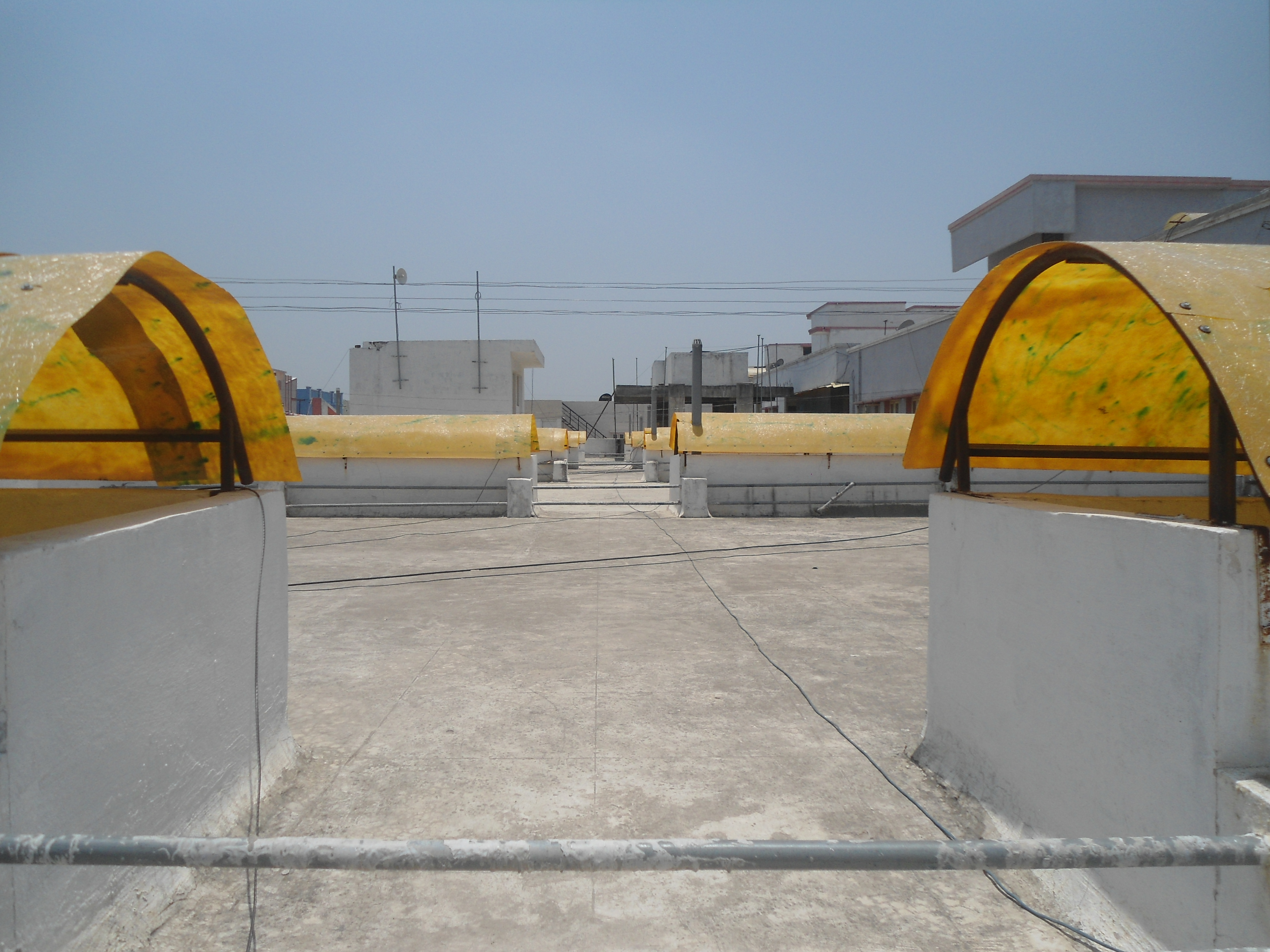
Terrace of an apartment in Nizampet

== Transport ==
Nizampet is connected by the Telangana State Road Transport Corporation, which runs Bus 231M (which runs every hour like 3:15 pm, 4:15 pm) that connects to Secunderabad and some others to Hyderabad. 10N runs from Sec'bad station to Nizampet Village and Nizampet Junction to Bachupally. The 287N connects Koti and Nizampet. The closest two Hyderabad Multi-Modal Transport System stations are at the Hitech City Railway Station in Kukatpally Housing Board and the Hafeezpet Station. A proposed metro terminal and Intercity bus terminus at Bachupally are in proximity of Nizampet. The 195 route runs every 30 minutes from Bachupally-Waverock, Manikonda via Nizampet Village, JNTU, Hitech City, Infosys, Wipro, DLF connects most of the IT corridor.

Nizampet is connected to NH65 via the Nizampet road which is the main arterial of the area which was historically used to connect the village to Bachupally and NH65 pre-urbanisation and it struggles with congestion due to rapid partially unplanned urban growth and its narrowness.

== Fitness ==
- Stark Fitness Studio In Pragathi Nagar
- Jaguar Gym (Pragathi Nagar)
- CrossXFit Box (Pragathi Nagar).
- E fitness STUDIO - Nizampet

== Education ==
=== Schools ===
The schools around Nizampet and Bachupally include:

- Academic Heights Public School
- Lilliputs Pre School & Samskruti Vidyalaya
- Sanghamitra (Central Board of Secondary Education)
- Honey Tots School, Hi Tension Lane Road, Nizampet
- Creek Planet School (Central Board of Secondary Education, Bachupally)
- ATRI Public School (Central Board of Secondary Education), Nizampet Road, Kukatpally, Hyderabad
- Kennedy High, the global school (Bachupally) (Central Board of Secondary Education)
- SR Digi school
- Little Flower Grammer high school, RGK, NIZAMPET.
- Vignan (Bachupally, Central Board of Secondary Education)
- Rajadhani Residential school (Nizampet) (Central Board of Secondary Education)
- Kidzee Pre school
- Crayons Creative School on Bloomingdale road.
- Ravindra Bharathi School (i-v: Central Board of Secondary Education, VI-X: State)
- Silver Oaks - The School of Hyderabad (Bachupally, Central Board of Secondary Education)
- Geetanjali Olympiad (Bachupally)
- Narayana E-Techno School

For 10+2 education institutes like Sri Chaitanya, Vignan, Vedantu and NRI college are near Nizampet.

=== Higher Education ===
Nizampet is well surrounded by higher educational institutes. Some of the nearby higher educational institutes include:

Degree/PG colleges: Rishi UBR, MNR, Shantiniketan, Vignan (Bachupally)

Engineering colleges: BVRIT Hyderabad College of Engineering for Women, Gokaraju Rangaraju Institute of Engineering and Technology, VNR Vignana Jyothi Institute of Engineering and Technology, Rishi MS Institute of Engineering and Technology for Women

Pharmacy colleges: Gokaraju Rangaraju College of Pharmacy (Bachupally)

Management institutes: JNTUH, Rishi UBR.

== Culture ==
Nizampet and Nizampet Road

- SreeBhu Sametha Sree Venkateshwara Swami Temple (Bhavya's Anandam Apt. Nizampet road)
- Seven Hills Venkateswara Swami Temple and Vinayaka Temple
- Anjaneya Swami temple (Brindavan Colony, Nizampet)

Nizampet Village

- Sree Kanakadurga Ammavari Temple (back side of Abhayanjaneya Swami temple)
- Ellamma Temple, on Blooming Dale Road
- Abhayanjaneya Swami temple (Nizampet Village Bus Stop)
- Hanuman Temple (Bandari Layout, Nizampet Village close to Gram Panchayat Office)
- Srisitaramalayam over 500 years old (near Sriramula kunta and Nizampet lake- behind Nizampet Village Highschool)
- Sri Mallikarjuna Temple (near Nizampet Village Water Tank)

== See also ==
- Bachupally
- Miyapur
- Kukatpally
