= Readwhere =

Online comic book hub for publishers in India

- Industry: Digital publishing
- Founded: 2012; 14 years ago
- Founders: Gaurav Bhatnagar, Manish Dingra and Mridul Kashatria
- Headquarters: Gurgaon, India
- Products: Newspapers, Magazines, Books and Comics
- Parent: Mediology Software
- Website: www.readwhere.com

Readwhere is an online reading and publishing hub with over 2000+ newspapers, 1000+ magazines and 700+ titles from comic book publishers of India. The headquarters is located in Gurgaon.

== Business operations ==
Readwhere covers newspaper in English, Hindi, Marathi, Malayalam, Tamil, Telugu, Punjabi, Gujarati, Kannada, Urdu, German and Chinese. It has applications available for iOS, Android, and is accessible from Readwhere's website. Its headquarters is located in Gurgaon and branch office located in Hyderabad. In July 2018, Readwhere CMS (Complete Mobile Solution) was certified by Google Developers as a solution partner for building advanced mobile experiences in the News and Media vertical.
