= Suraram, Nalgonda district =

Suraram pedda surarm
- village
- Location in Andhra Pradesh, India Suraram (India)
- Coordinates: 17.31°N 79.14°E
- Country: India
- State: Telangana
- District: Nalgonda

Languages
  - Official: Telugu
- Time zone: UTC+5:30 (IST)

Suraram is a village in the Nalgonda district, in the Telangana state in India.
