= Bachupally =

- Neighbourhood & Mandal
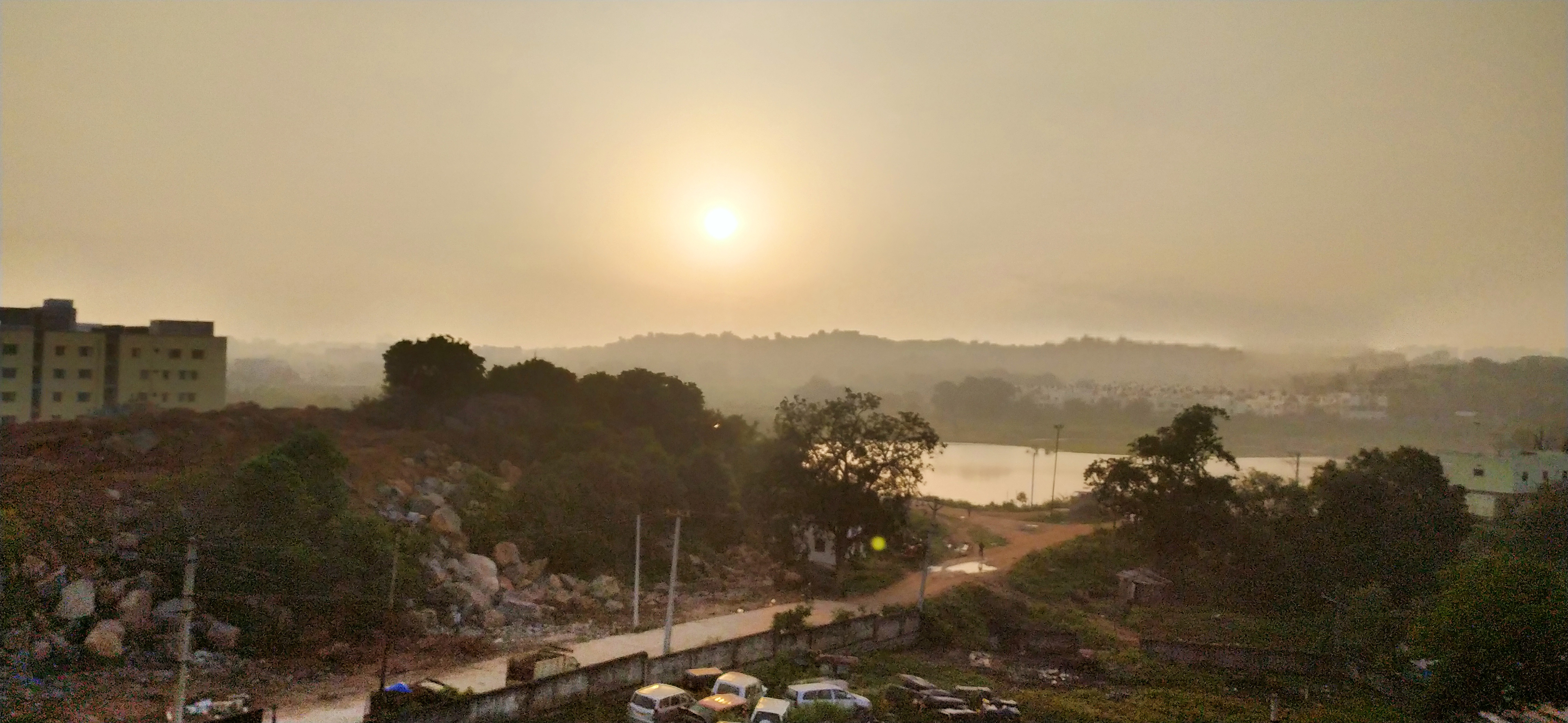
- Bachupally Pond morning view

- Location in Telangana, India Bachupally (India)
- Coordinates: 17.54685°N 78.365023°E
- Country: India
- State: Telangana
- District: Medchal-Malkajgiri

Government
  - Type: Municipal Corporation
  - Body: Cyberabad Municipal Corporation (CMC), HMDA

Languages
  - Official: Telugu
- Time zone: UTC+5:30 (IST)
- PIN: 500 118
- Vehicle registration: TG-08
- Lok Sabha constituency: Malkajgiri
- Vidhan Sabha constituency: Quthbullapur
- Planning agency: HMDA

Bachupally is a suburb in the Medchal-Malkajgiri district of the Indian state of Telangana. It is the mandal headquarters of Bachupally mandal in Malkajgiri revenue division. It was a part of Ranga Reddy district before the re-organisation of districts in the state. Its postal code is 500090.

== Economy ==
Real estate in Bachupally is one of the major sector in the area. contributing to the economy. Harithavanam Colony is the economical hub It is also referred to as the pharmaceutical hub of Hyderabad, as it houses R&D centers of top pharma manufacturers including Dr. Reddy's lab, Aurobindo Pharma, and SMS Pharma.

== Education ==
Junior colleges: Sri Chaitanya, Gayatri Jr College, Akshara Junior Colleges, Abhyas junior college, bhashyam Jr College, and Narayana residential colleges are located in Bachupally.

Engineering colleges: Gokaraju Rangaraju Institute of Engineering and Technology, VNR Vignana Jyothi Institute of Engineering and Technology, and BVRIT .

University: Potti Sreeramulu Telugu University (100-acre campus, under construction)

Schools: Keshava Reddy, Kennedy, Unicent Public School, Sentia, Surya, Ganges Vally, Akshara the Planet School, Oakridge International School, Delhi Public School, Silver Oaks, Laurus - the school of excellence and VIKAS are few of the top schools located here.

== Healthcare ==
SLG Hospital, Mamata Academy of Medical Sciences Hospital, Swastik Hospital district Sanga Reddy

== Road ==
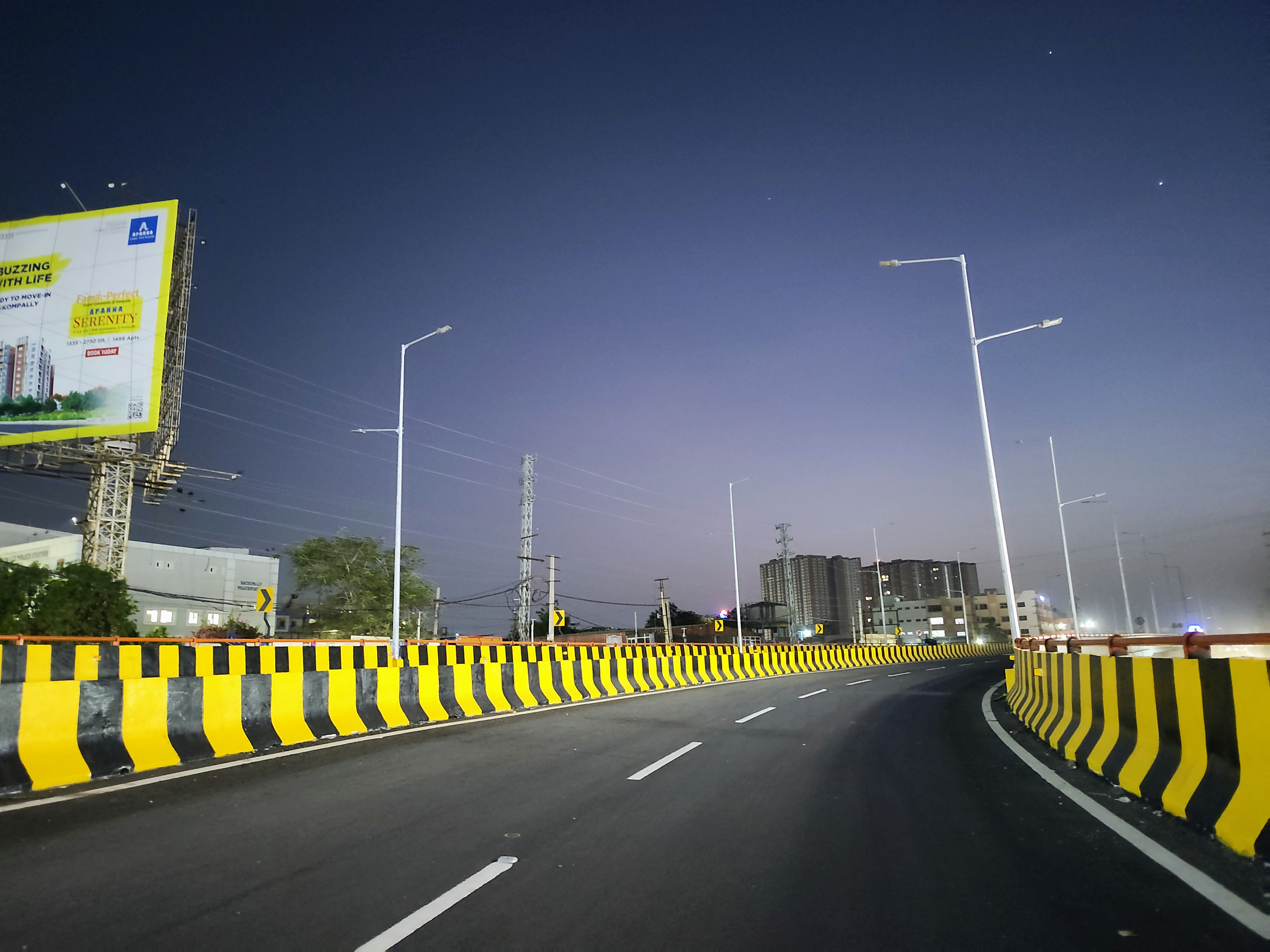
Bachupally flyover

Bachupally is well connected by road to all major areas, as TSRTC runs daily services to the IT corridor and to the other places of the city. The service to Hitech city runs every 30 mins. Travel time between Bachupally and Hitech City (The IT Hub) is around 20-30mins, depending upon the traffic situation.

Bachupally may be reached by road via ORR, driving through Mallampet which is a motorable road, and then the drive on the 6-lane ORR. The area dwellers highlight that the drive on ORR is pleasing and free of problems, even after onset of monsoon.

In June 2026, 1.3 - kms Bachupally flyover was officially open, that eases congestion on the busy corridor stretching between Miyapur X roads and Gandimaisamma. It connects residents traveling to and from Bachupally, Miyapur, Nizampet, Pragathi Nagar, Mallampet, and Bowrampet. The flyover stretches from Mamata Academy Of Medical Sciences near Bachupally X Roads to Sikhara Villas.

== Bachupally concerns ==
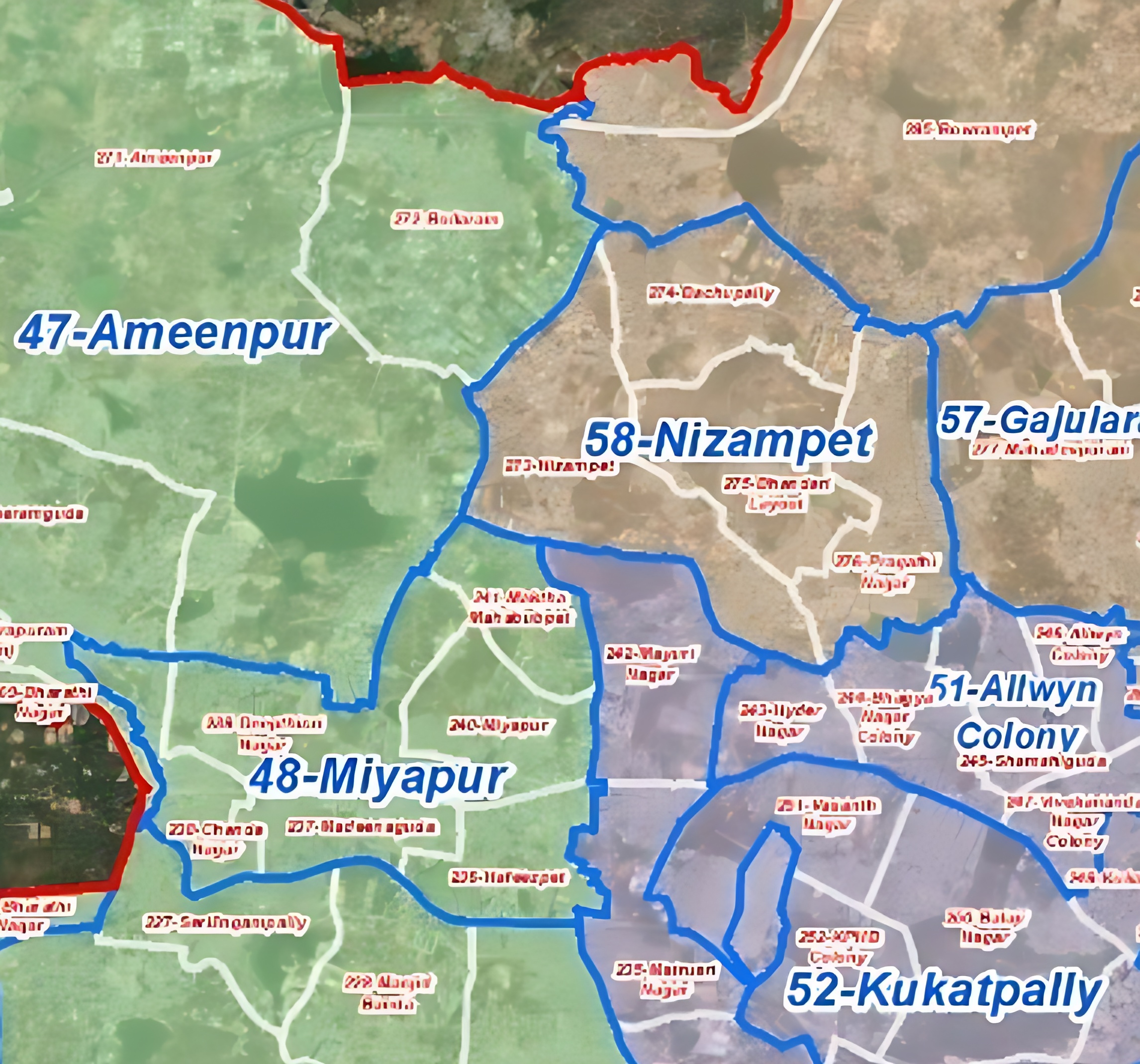
Nizampet Circle Map

=== Issues ===
- Traffic and Road Conditions: While the elevated stretch of Bachupally flyover is operational for over 1.5 lakh vehicles a day, motorists still experience brief bottlenecks at the entry and exit points, as road widening works on the 15-kilometer ground-level corridor are ongoing. Local roads—like the DPS-Bowrampet stretch—remain in disrepair, and bottlenecks during peak hours cause significant stress and travel delays.
- Industrial Pollution and Stench: Residents frequently complain about a strong, often toxic, chemical odor during the late night and early morning hours across the Bachupally, Mallampet, and Nizampet areas. This air quality degradation and dust have prompted community protests and demands for stricter monitoring.
- Solid Waste and Sanitation: A large, unmanaged garbage dump on the busy Miyapur-Bachupally stretch (near the RTC bus depot) and the Sai Nagar dumping yard cause foul odors, attract stray animals, and create serious health hazards for commuters and nearby communities.
- Waterlogging and Lake Pollution: Monsoon season brings severe waterlogging on major roads like the Miyapur-Bachupally main thoroughfare. Local water bodies, such as the Pattikunta Lake, are suffering from rapid ecological decline as raw sewage and drainage lines are diverted into them.

== Transport ==
Bachupally is well connected by road to all major areas, as TSRTC runs daily services to the IT corridor and to the other places of the city. The closest MMTS train station is at Hafeezpet. The closest metro stations are Miyapur and JNTU College.

== Lakes ==
Bachupally Bin Kunta Lake(Biruni), Meddi Kunta are the big lakes and there are few other like SRR Pride lake, totally 17 lakes in Bachupally.
