= Kukatpally =

Suburb in Hyderabad, India

- Suburb
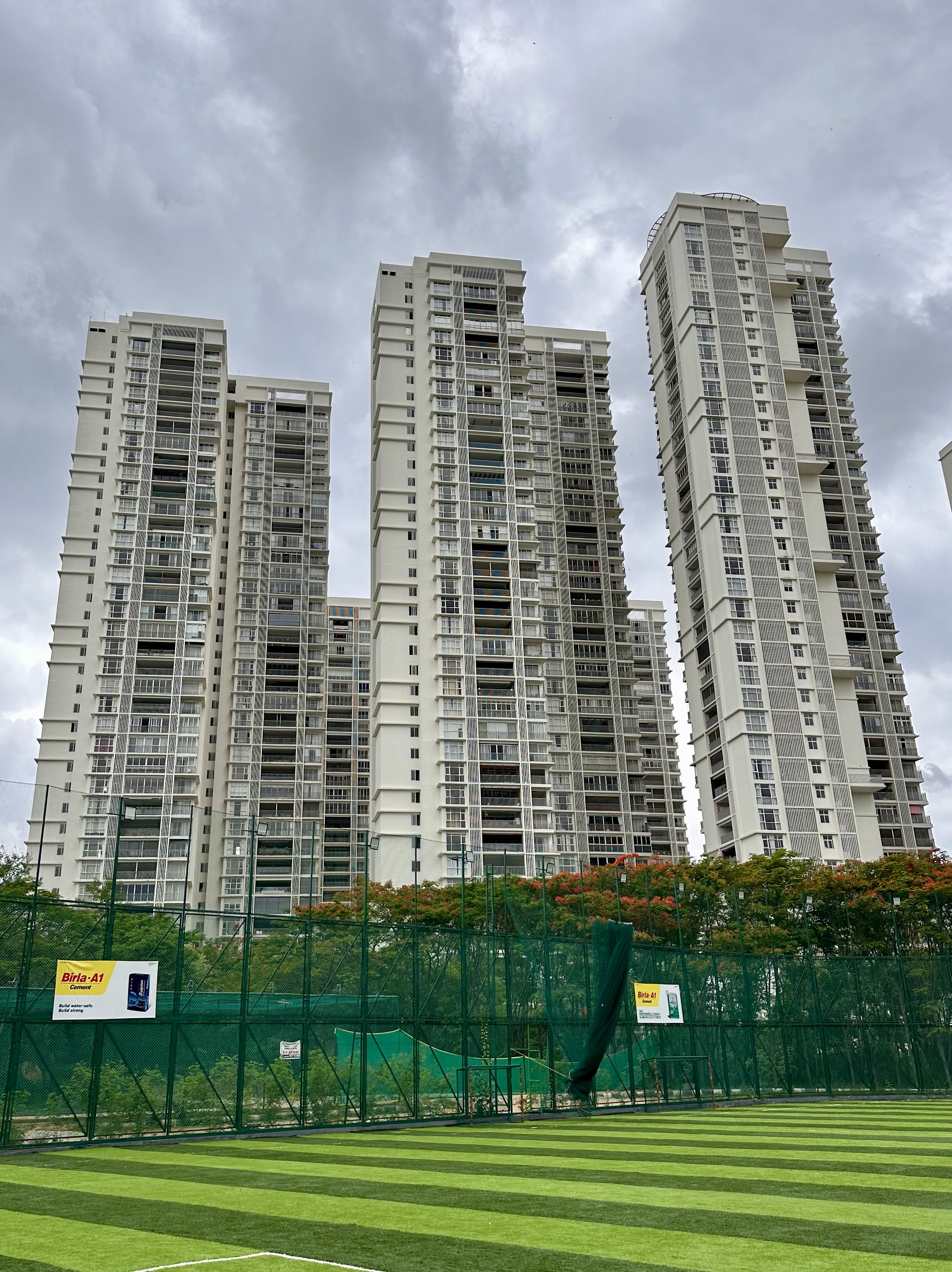
- Lodha Bellezza in Kukatpally Hyderabad

- Location in Telangana, India Kukatpally (Telangana) Kukatpally (India)
- Coordinates: 17°29′N 78°25′E
- Country: India
- State: Telangana
- District: Medchal-Malkajgiri
- City: Hyderabad

Government
  - Type: Mayor-Council
  - Body: GHMC

Area
  - Total: 20.68 km^{2} (7.98 sq mi)

Population (2020)
  - Total: 252,830
  - Density: 12,225/km^{2} (31,660/sq mi)

Languages
  - Official: Telugu
- Time zone: UTC+5:30 (IST)
- PIN: 500 072,500 085
- Vehicle registration: TG-07
- Lok Sabha constituency: Malkajgiri
- Vidhan Sabha constituency: Kukatpally
- Planning agency: HMDA
- Civic agency: GHMC

Kukatpally is a suburb in northwestern Hyderabad in the Indian state of Telangana. It is the headquarters of Balanagar mandal in the Malkajgiri revenue division of the Medchal–Malkajgiri district. Kukatpally was a municipality before its merger into the Greater Hyderabad Municipal Corporation (GHMC). It is now the headquarters of the north zone of the GHMC. It is connected by road to the nearby information technology hub of HITEC City.

== History ==
Kukatpally used to be an industrial corridor in the northwestern part of Hyderabad. Its population began to grow after the early 1990s, and many people migrating from Andhra Pradesh settled in and around Kukatpally. Formerly a municipality, Kukutpally has merged into the Greater Hyderabad Municipal Corporation.

Kukatpally was historically a semi rural area characterised by agricultural land and green reserves. The locality experienced rapid urbanisation with the expansion of the Hyderabad Metro and the Outer Ring Road network, which improved connectivity to western Hyderabad. The growth of nearby employment hubs, including HITEC City and other corporate and software centres, further accelerated residential and commercial development, transforming Kukatpally into a major urban locality with numerous residential layouts and apartment projects.

== Demographics ==
The predominant language spoken in Kukatpally is Telugu. The suburb has the greatest population density within Hyderabad with 33,076 persons per km^{2}.

== Governance ==
The Cyberabad Municipal Corporation (CMC) was constituted on 11 February 2026 following the reorganisation of the Greater Hyderabad Municipal Corporation (GHMC) by the Government of Telangana. The reorganisation divided the erstwhile GHMC into three municipal corporations, namely the Greater Hyderabad Municipal Corporation, Cyberabad Municipal Corporation, and Malkajgiri Municipal Corporation, to improve administrative efficiency and urban governance. Cyberabad Municipal Corporation was formed by combining the Serilingampally, Kukatpally, and Quthbullapur zones of the former GHMC and was constituted under the provisions of the Greater Hyderabad Municipal Corporation Act, 1955.

The administration of the Cyberabad Municipal Corporation is headed by the Municipal Commissioner, Dr. G. Srijana, IAS. G. Anjaneyulu serves as the Deputy Commissioner of the Kukatpally Zone.

=== Administrative divisions of Cyberabad Municipal Corporation ===
| Zone | Number of circles | Number of wards |
|---|---|---|
| Serilingampally | 5 | 26 |
| Kukatpally | 4 | 23 |
| Quthbullapur | 7 | 27 |
| Total | 16 | 76 |

== Economy ==
Many commercial establishments, shops, educational institutes, institutions for higher studies, and colleges are situated in Kukatpally, and as a result many students reside here. Small IT companies, service based industries, restaurants, and eateries are situated here, as it has been the nearest residential hub in proximity to Hitec City. Metro depot, malls, and residential projects are in Kukatpally, Chanda Nagar locality. Many government offices like the BSNL, Central Excise & Customs, and Revenue Department are situated here. Several small scale industries are based in the Kukatpally–Sanathnagar belt. The presence of the Mumbai National Highway and Kukatpally Housing Board has led to a large-scale boom in retail activity, and Kukatpally has become a commercial hub in northwestern Hyderabad for restaurants, clothing retailers, and SME offices.

The land prices of Kukatpally are high compared to most of Hyderabad. There are some residential high-rise apartments. Land costs ₹50,000–250,000 per square yard. A residential flat costs ₹4500–8000 per square foot. Lodha Bellezza, the first skyscraper of Hyderabad taller than 150 metres, was constructed in Kukatpally in 2014, and it remained the tallest building in Hyderabad until 2024.

== Transportation ==
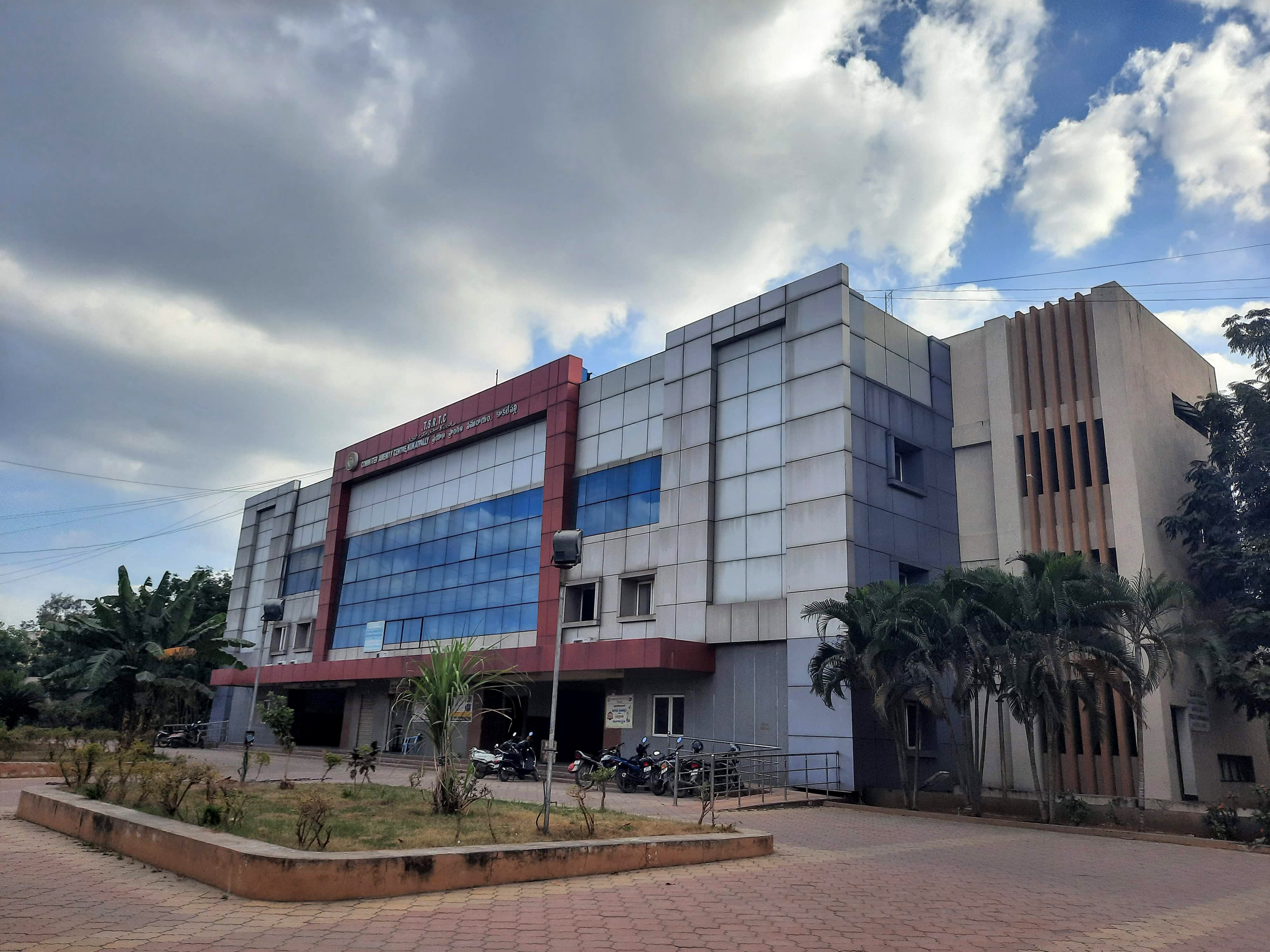
Bus terminal in Kukatpally

Kukatpally is well-connected by road, rail, and air. The nearest airport is Rajiv Gandhi International Airport in Shamshabad. The nearest railway station is in Lingampally. It has three metro stations – Kukatpally, KPHB and Balanagar (Moosapet) – and can also be reached by MMTS stations in HITEC City and in Bharat Nagar. TSRTC operates buses in Kukatpally and has excellent connectivity with almost all parts of Hyderabad. TSRTC maintains a depot at the Kukatpally Y Junction.

== Education ==
The suburb has several colleges and institutes, including Holy Mary College, Tapasya College of Commerce and Management, Hamstech College of Creative Education, Avinash College, Bonfire Institute of Design, and All India Institute of Technology

== Places of interest ==
- Ranganadhaswamy Lake (IDL Lake): An urban lake and recreational spot offering a peaceful environment for walking and views of the surrounding cityscape.
- HUDA Park: A public park providing green open space for recreation, frequented by families, walkers, and joggers.
- Modern shopping and business complexes: Commercial and business developments that reflect Kukatpally’s rapid urbanisation and economic growth.

== Notable people ==
- Vengalrao Gottimukula (born 1960), politician
