= Unified Metropolitan Transportation Authority =

Intian transportation planning agency

Hyderabad Urban Metropolitan Transportation Authority
- HUMTA

Agency overview
- Formed: 2008
- Preceding agency: Hyderabad Metropolitan Development Authority
- Type: Urban Transport Planning Agency
- Jurisdiction: List: Hyderabad- full (16 Mandals _________________________________; Rangareddy- Mandals of Shamshabad, Rajendranagar, Sherilingampally, Balanagar, Quthubullapur, Malkajigiri, Keesara, Ghatkesar, Uppal, Saroornagar, Medchal, Shameerpet, Hayathnagar, Shankerpally, Chevella, Shahbad, Moinabad, Maheshwaram, Ibrahimpatnam, Manchal, Yacharam, Kandukur. _________________________________; Y.Bhuvanagiri- Mandals of Bhuvanagiri, Bibinagar, Pochampally, Bommala Ramaram, M.Turkapally. _________________________________; Medak- Mandals Narsapur, Shivampet, Tupran, Manoharabad. __________________________________; Siddipet- Mandals Markook, Mulugu, wargal. __________________________________; SangaReddy- Mandals Sangareddy, Jinnaram, Ameenpur, Patancheru, Gummadidhala. _________________________________; Mahbubnagar- Mandals of Farooq Nagar, Kothur.
- Headquarters: Hyderabad, Telangana; 17°21′57″N 78°28′33″E
- Website: www.hmda.gov.in/umta.html

The Hyderabad Urban Metropolitan Transportation (HUMTA) is the urban transportation planning agency of Hyderabad, Telangana, India. It was constituted in 2008 by an Act of the Andhra Pradesh legislature (G O Ms. No. 624).

In 2019, Municipal Administration and Urban Development (MA&UD) department, Telangana decided to revive the Hyderabad Urban Metropolitan Transport Authority (HUMTA). HUMTA is a wing of Hyderabad Metropolitan Development Authority (HMDA). HUMTA acts as an umbrella for various agencies that are connected to traffic and transportation issues to ensure last-mile connectivity in Hyderabad.

== See also ==
- Hyderabad Metropolitan Development Authority (HMDA)
- Inner Ring Road, Hyderabad
- Radial Roads, Hyderabad (India)
- Elevated Expressways in Hyderabad
- Intermediate Ring Road, Hyderabad (India)
- Outer Ring Road, Hyderabad
- Regional Ring Road
- List of Flyovers in Hyderabad
