= Hyderabad Metropolitan Region =

- Metropolitan Area
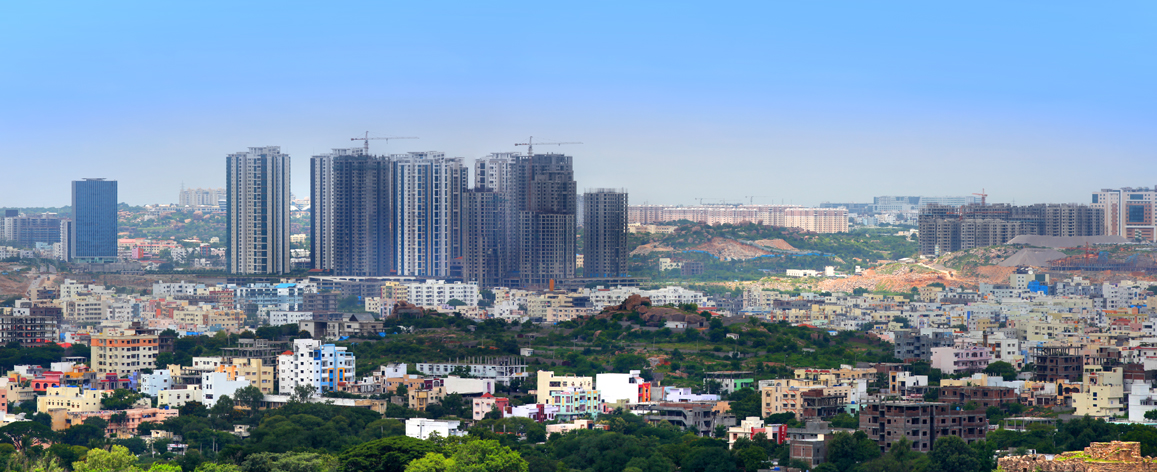
- Hyderabad skyline in 2012
- State: Telangana
- Core city: Hyderabad
- Districts: Hyderabad; Bhuvanagiri; Medchal-Malkajgiri; Rangareddy; Siddipet; Sangareddy; Medak

Area
  - Urban: 1,225.59 km^{2} (473.20 sq mi)
  - Metro: 10,472.723 km^{2} (4,043.541 sq mi)

Population (2011)
  - Estimate (2024): ▲11,068,877
  - Rank: 6
  - Urban: 7,677,018
  - Urban density: 6,263.94/km^{2} (16,223.5/sq mi)
  - Metro: 9,600,000
  - Metro density: 920/km^{2} (2,400/sq mi)
- Demonym: Hyderabadi
- Time zone: UTC+5:30 (Indian Standard Time)
- Website: www.hmda.gov.in

Hyderabad Metropolitan Region

The Hyderabad Metropolitan Region is the metropolitan area covered by the city of Hyderabad in the Indian state of Telangana. The region is spread over the districts of Hyderabad, Bhuvanagiri, Medchal-Malkajgiri, Ranga Reddy, Sangareddy, Medak, and Siddipet. Under the jurisdiction of Hyderabad Metropolitan Development Authority, it covers an area of 10,472.723 km^{2} (4,043.541 sq mi) and has a population of 11 million people.

== Metropolitan Area ==
The areas under Hyderabad Metropolitan Development Authority include districts of Hyderabad district, Medchal district, part of Rangareddy district, Bhuvanagiri district, Sangareddy district, Medak district,Vikarabad district, Mahabubnagar district, Nalgonda district, Nagarkurnool district and Siddipet district.[3] The metropolitan region covers 11 districts, 104 mandals, and 1,355 villages, including Greater Hyderabad Municipal Corporation which consists of 175 villages and 12 municipalities / nagar panchayats consisting of 31 villages.

S.No	District	Mandals / Tehsil	Total Mandals
1	Hyderabad district	Complete district	16
2	Medchal - Malkajgiri District	Complete district Ghatkesar, Shameerpet, Medchal, Uppal Kalan, Keesara, Quthubullapur, Medipally, Bachupally, Dundigal, Kapra, Balanagar, Kukatpally, Malkajgiri, Alwal and Muduchintalapalli	14
3	Ranga Reddy district	Complete district Chevella, Hayathnagar, Ibrahimpatnam, Kandukur, Maheshwaram, Manchal, Moinabad, Rajendranagar, Saroornagar, Shahbad, Shamshabad, Shankerpally, Yacharam, Abdullapurmet, Balapur, Farooqnagar, Gandipet, Kothur, Nandigama, Serilingampally, Amangal, Chowdergudem, Kadthal, Keshampeta, Kondurg, Irwin, Madgul and Talakondapally	28
4	Sangareddy district	Patancheru, Ramachandrapuram, Sangareddy, Ameenpur, Gummadidala, Jinnaram, Kandi, Hathnoor, Chowtakur, Kondapur and Sadaivapet	11
5	Yadadri Bhuvanagiri district	Bhuvanagiri, Bibinagar, Bommala Ramaram, Choutuppal, Pochampally, Bommalaramaram, Choutuppal, Narayanpoor, Rajapeta, Turkapalle (M), Valigonda and Yadagirigutta	12
6	Medak district	Manoharabad, Narsapur, Shivampet, Tupran, Masaipet and Yeldurthy	6
7	Siddipet district	Markook, Mulugu, Gajwel, Jagdevpur, Rajpole and Wargal	6
8	Mahabubnagar district	Balanagar, and Rajapur	2
9	Nagarkurnool district	Veldanda	1
10	Nalgonda district	Chintapally, Gattuppal, Marriguda and Nampally	4
11	Vikarabad district	Mominpet, Nawabpet, Pargi, Pudur and Vikarabad	5

== Municipal Corporations ==
Following Municipal corporation's are in Hyderabad Metropolitan Region.

- Greater Hyderabad Municipal Corporation
- Cyberabad Municipal Corporation
- Malkajgiri Municipal Corporation

== Municipal Councils ==
Following Municipal Councils are in Hyderabad Metropolitan Region.

- Chevella Municipality
- Moinabad Municipality
- Sangareddy Municipality
- Gaddapotharam Municipality
- Gummadidala Municipality
- Indresham Municipality
- Isnapur Municipality
- Jinnaram Municipality
- Bhuvanagiri Municipality
- Choutuppal Municipality
- Pochampally Municipality
- Gajwel Municipality
- Aliabad Municipality
- Mudichintalapalle Municipality
- Yellampet Municipality
- Ibrahimpatnam Municipality
- Shadnagar Municipality
- Shankarpalli Municipality
- Narsapur Municipality
- Toopran Municipality
- Viakarabad Municipality
Municipal Corporation & Councils in Hyderabad Metropolitan Region, Green GHMC, Red District headquarters & Municipalities, Blue Municipal Corporations, Purple Municipalities, Yellow other urban centres
Hyderabad Metropolitan Region (India)
