= Regional Ring Road, Hyderabad =

Proposed road in Telangana, India

Hyderabad Regional Ring Road (HRRR)

Route information
- Auxiliary route of NH 63
- Maintained by Greater Hyderabad Municipal Corporation, Hyderabad Metropolitan Region, Hyderabad Metropolitan Development Authority
- Length: 210 mi (340 km)
- Existed: 2018; 8 years ago–present

Major junctions
- Ring road around Hyderabad
- South end: Kandi
- North end: Sangareddy

Location
- Country: India

Highway system
- Roads in India; Expressways; National; State; Asian

The Hyderabad Regional Ring Road (HRRR) is a proposed ring road around the city of Hyderabad, Telangana, India. It is a 6 lane, 340-kilometre-long (210 mi) road, planned on strengthening the existing road network and by adding new stretches wherever linkages were found missing. National Highways Authority of India has included Regional Ring road in the pan-India Bharatmala Pariyojana Phase-2. It helps connect the districts around city of Hyderabad. It helps in linking major national highways like NH 65, NH 44, NH 163, NH 765.

== Major towns proposed to be connected by HRRR ==
The major towns and villages are in Rangareddy, Bhuvanagiri, Siddipet and Sangareddy districts.

The project will be developed in two portions:

Northern half with a length of approx. 164 km is estimated to cost Rs. 9,500-crore and will connect Sangareddy, Narsapur, Toopran, Gajwel, Pragnapur, Yadagirigutta, and Bhuvanagiri

Southern half with a length of approx. 182 km is estimated to cost Rs. 6,480-crore and will connect Bhuvanagiri, Choutuppal, Mall, Amangal, Shadnagar, Chevella, Shankarpally and Sangareddy.

- Bhuvanagiri, Telangana
- Yadagirigutta
- Valigonda
- Sangem
- Choutuppal
- Samsthan Narayanapur
- Shivannaguda
- Marrigudem
- Mall-Kurmapally
- Nagilla
- Amangal
- Keshampet
- Shadnagar
- Shabad
- Chevalla
- Nawabpet
- Sangareddy
- Doulthabad
- Narsapur
- Shivampet
- Toopran
- Nacharam
- Gajwel
- Jagdevpur
- M.Turkapally

== Draft ==
In the first draft proposal, it was proposed as Peripheral Ring Road (PRR) but the ring road has been renamed as RRR-triple R, covering 330 km.

== See also ==
- Unified Metropolitan Transportation Authority, Hyderabad (India)
- Outer Ring Road, Hyderabad
- Inner Ring Road, Hyderabad
- Radial Roads, Hyderabad (India)
- Elevated Expressways in Hyderabad
- Intermediate Ring Road, Hyderabad (India)
- Peripheral Ring Road
- Satellite Town Ring Road
- List of longest ring roads
