= Thatiparthy =

Thatiparthy Thadiparthy
- Village
- Country: India
- State: Telangana

Government
  - Type: local body
  - Body: Gram Panchayat

Population (2019)
  - Total: 1,780

Languages
  - Official: Telugu
- Time zone: UTC+5:30 (IST)
- Postal code: 501509
- +91: 501509
- Vehicle registration: TS 07 XXXX

Thadiparthy or Thatiparthy is a Panchayat and Revenue village in Ranga Reddy district in Telangana State, India. It falls under Yacharam mandal, and Division of Ibrahimpatnam Taluk, Ranga Reddy District, Telangana state, Postal code: 501509. It is just 50 km far away from Hyderabad city.

It depends majorly on agriculture and its cultivate is mainly paddy, cotton and vegetables. Its huge irrigation system source is a ground water facility through pumping and man made wells throughout the year.
