= Dommara Pochampally =

- Out growth
- Country: India
- State: Telangana
- District: Ranga Reddy
- Metro: Hyderabad

Government
  - Body: Gram panchayat

Population
  - Total: 5,615

Languages
  - Official: Telugu
- Time zone: UTC+5:30 (IST)
- PIN: 500043
- Vehicle registration: TG
- Lok Sabha constituency: Malkajgiri
- Vidhan Sabha constituency: Quthbullapur
- Planning agency: HMDA

Dommara Pochampally is an out growth in Medchal district of the Indian state of Telangana. It is located in Qutbullapur mandal of Malkajgiri revenue division. It is a part of Ranga Reddy district before the re-organisation of districts. The settlement is part of Hyderabad Metropolitan Region and administered by the urban planning body of Hyderabad Metropolitan Development Authority.

== Demographics ==
As of 2011 census, Domara Pochampally had a population of 5,615 with 1,332 households. The total population constitute, 2,907 males and 2,708 females —a sex ratio of 932 females per 1000 males. 763 children are in the age group of 0–6 years, of which 398 are boys and 365 are girls. The average literacy rate stands at 70.30% with 3,411 literates, significantly higher than the state average of 67.41%.
