= Hyderabad Metropolitan Development Authority =

Urban planning agency of Hyderabad, Telangana, India

Agency overview
- Formed: 2008; 18 years ago
- Preceding agency: Hyderabad Urban Development Authority
- Type: Urban Planning Agency
- Jurisdiction: List: Hyderabad- full (16 Mandals); Ranga Reddy district and Medchal-Malkajgiri district- Mandals of Shamshabad, Rajendranagar, Sherilingampally, Balanagar, Quthubullapur, Malkajigiri, Alwal, Keesara, Ghatkesar, Uppal, Saroornagar, Medchal, Shameerpet, Hayathnagar, Shankerpally, Chevella, Shahbad, Moinabad, Maheshwaram, Ibrahimpatnam, Manchal, Yacharam, Kandukur, Farooqnagar, Kothur; Bhuvanagiri district : Bhuvanagiri Town, Bibinagar, Pochampally, Bommalaramaram, Choutuppal; Siddipet district: Markook, Wargal, Mulugu; Sangareddy district: Patancheru, Ramachandrapuram, Sangareddy, Jinnaram, Hathnoora, Narsapur, Shivampet, Tupran
- Headquarters: Hyderabad, Telangana; 17°21′57″N 78°28′33″E
- Annual budget: ₹ 54.5236 billion
- Ministers responsible: Anumula Revanth Reddy, Chief Minister/Chairman; Anumula Revanth Reddy, Municipal Administration & Urban Development; Asaduddin Owaisi (MP, Hyderabad); Gangapuram Kishan Reddy (MP, Secunderabad); Konda Vishweshwar Reddy (MP, Chevella); Etela Rajendar (MP, Malkajigiri)
- Agency executives: SARFARAZ AHMAD, IAS, (Metropolitan Commissioner And Prl Secretary to Govt MA & UD); ▪️PARAM JYOTHI, (CE/Managing Director (HGCL)/PD ORRP(I/c))
- Parent agency: Department of Municipal Administration and Urban Development
- Website: www.hmda.gov.in

The Hyderabad Metropolitan Development Authority (HMDA) is the urban planning agency of Hyderabad in the Indian state of Telangana. The HMDA administers the Hyderabad Metropolitan Region, spread over an area of 7,257 km^{2} (2,802 sq mi) and covers the districts of Hyderabad district, Medchal district, part of Rangareddy district, Bhuvanagiri district, Sangareddy district, Medak district and Siddipet district. HMDA is the largest urban development authority in India before formation of Andhra Pradesh Capital Region Development Authority, Amaravati (8352.69 km^{2}). HMDA was formed by the merging of the following erstwhile entities: Hyderabad Urban Development Authority (HUDA), Hyderabad Airport Development Authority (HADA), Cyberabad Development Authority (CDA) and Buddha Poornima Project Authority (BPPA). HMDA was set up for the purposes of planning, co-ordination, supervising, promoting and securing the planned development of the Hyderabad Metropolitan Region. It coordinates the development activities of the municipal corporations, municipalities and other local authorities, the Hyderabad Metropolitan Water Supply & Sewerage Board, the Telangana State Transmission Corporation, the Telangana State Infrastructure Corporation.

The Hyderabad Metropolitan Development Authority maintains a database of lakes and ponds at https://lakes.hmda.gov.in, each having a "LakeID" such as "871" or "1000/N/005".

== Outer Ring Road ==
HMDA built the Outer Ring Road at a cost of 6696 crores. The project started in 2005 and was completed in May 2018.

== HUMTA ==
In 2019, Municipal Administration and Urban Development (MA&UD) department, Telangana decided to revive the Hyderabad Urban Metropolitan Transport Authority (HUMTA). HUMTA is a wing of Hyderabad Metropolitan Development Authority (HMDA). HUMTA acts as an umbrella for various agencies that are connected to traffic and transportation issues to ensure last-mile connectivity in Hyderabad.

== Jurisdiction ==
The areas under Hyderabad Metropolitan Development Authority include districts of Hyderabad district, Medchal district, part of Rangareddy district, Bhuvanagiri district, Sangareddy district, Medak district,Vikarabad district, Mahabubnagar district, Nalgonda district, Nagarkurnool district and Siddipet district.[3] The metropolitan region covers 11 districts, 104 mandals, and 1,355 villages, including Greater Hyderabad Municipal Corporation which consists of 175 villages and 12 municipalities / nagar panchayats consisting of 31 villages.

S.No	District	Mandals / Tehsil	Total Mandals
1	Hyderabad district	Complete district	16
2	Medchal - Malkajgiri District	Complete district Ghatkesar, Shameerpet, Medchal, Uppal Kalan, Keesara, Quthubullapur, Medipally, Bachupally, Dundigal, Kapra, Balanagar, Kukatpally, Malkajgiri, Alwal and Muduchintalapalli	14
3	Ranga Reddy district	Complete district Chevella, Hayathnagar, Ibrahimpatnam, Kandukur, Maheshwaram, Manchal, Moinabad, Rajendranagar, Saroornagar, Shahbad, Shamshabad, Shankerpally, Yacharam, Abdullapurmet, Balapur, Farooqnagar, Gandipet, Kothur, Nandigama, Serilingampally, Amangal, Chowdergudem, Kadthal, Keshampeta, Kondurg, Irwin, Madgul and Talakondapally	28
4	Sangareddy district	Patancheru, Ramachandrapuram, Sangareddy, Ameenpur, Gummadidala, Jinnaram, Kandi, Hathnoor, Chowtakur, Kondapur and Sadaivapet	11
5	Yadadri Bhuvanagiri district	Bhuvanagiri, Bibinagar, Bommala Ramaram, Choutuppal, Pochampally, Bommalaramaram, Choutuppal, Narayanpoor, Rajapeta, Turkapalle (M), Valigonda and Yadagirigutta	12
6	Medak district	Manoharabad, Narsapur, Shivampet, Tupran, Masaipet and Yeldurthy	4
7	Siddipet district	Markook, Mulugu, Gajwel, Jagdevpur, Rajpole and Wargal	6
8	Mahabubnagar district	Balanagar, and Rajapur	2
9	Nagarkurnool district	Veldanda	1
10	Nalgonda district	Chintapally, Gattuppal, Marriguda and Nampally	3
11	Vikarabad district	Mominpet, Nawabpet, Pargi, Pudur and Vikarabad	5

== Development charges ==
The Government approved a 50 per cent increase in the development charges for the builders for construction of buildings in the extended areas of the HMDA.
