= Seriguda =

- Village
- Country: India
- State: Telangana
- District: Ranga Reddy
- Metro: Rangareddy district

Government
  - Body: Mandal Office

Languages
  - Official: Telugu
- Time zone: UTC+5:30 (IST)
- PIN: 501510
- Lok Sabha constituency: Nalgonda
- Vidhan Sabha constituency: Ibrahimpatnam
- Planning agency: Panchayat
- Civic agency: Mandal Office
- Website: telangana.gov.in

Seriguda is a village and panchayat in Rangareddy district, Telangana TS, India. It comes under Ibrahimpatnam mandal.

It is 27 km away from Hyderabad city. The Outer Ring Road, Hyderabad is 7 km from the village. Rajiv Gandhi International Airport is 40 km away.
