= Mondi Gowrelly =

Coordinates: 17.0372°N 78.7030°E

- Village
- Interactive map of Mondi Gowrelly
- Country: India
- State: Andhra Pradesh

Languages
  - Official: Telugu
- Time zone: UTC+5:30 (IST)
- Telephone code: 040
- Vehicle registration: AP 26 X XXXX

Mondi Gowrelly is a village in Ranga Reddy district in Andhra Pradesh, India. It falls under Yacharam mandal. It is 5 km (3.1 mi) from Yacharam.
