= Ramdaspally =

- Village
- Country: India
- State: Telangana

Languages
  - Official: Telugu
- Time zone: UTC+5:30 (IST)
- Telephone code: 040
- Vehicle registration: AP 26 X XXXX

Ramdaspally is a village in Ranga Reddy district in Telangana, India. The Village comes under Ibrahimpatnam mandal. Ramdaspalli village is two kilometers away from the Nagarjun Sagar Road (State Highway 19) and 14 km from NH9. Most of the villagers are farmers.
