= Radial Roads, Hyderabad =

Beltway road network in Hyderabad, India

Radial Road, Hyderabad

System information
- Maintained by Greater Hyderabad Municipal Corporation, Hyderabad Metropolitan Development Authority

Highway names

System links
- Roads in India; Expressways; National; State; Asian; State Highways in Telangana

The Radial Road or RR are roads identified as the main connecting roads between inner ring road and outer ring road in Hyderabad, Telangana India. It was built for better connectivity between city roads.

== Overview ==
The project aimed at giving better connectivity plans to extend the existing Ring Roads (inner/outer) to 4/6 lanes.

On the initiation of the (HMDA), the two radial roads to be extended include the roads, as of January, 2012, from Shaikpet to Kokapet(outer ring road/ORR) and Radhika Theatre to Yadgarpally outer ring road via Thumkunta. The project is being assisted financially by the (JICA). Work on another three roads are already in progress. According to HMDA's survey, altogether 33 radial roads will be required to ensure smooth traffic flow from the inner to outer ring road.

More construction of radial roads will be coming up in the forthcoming months, and according to HMDA on the completion of the targeted 158 km radial roads, a much smoother linkage between the inner and outer ring road is expected. As the total project cost comes to Rs. 2,500 crores as against available funds of only 380 crores loaned by JICA, the works will be executed phasewise with support from other agencies like the Roads and Building Department, Municipal Administration, and urban development departments.

The proposed 159 km long outer ringroad project envisages to ease the traffic jams around the cities and encompasses towns like, Patancheru – Shamshabad- Hayathnagar- Medchal- Patancheru also linking other National Highways, State Highways, MDRs and other roads. The Government of Telangana has initiated a new department called Hyderabad Growth Corridor Ltd (HGCL), to implement and supervise this project.

== Radial Roads ==
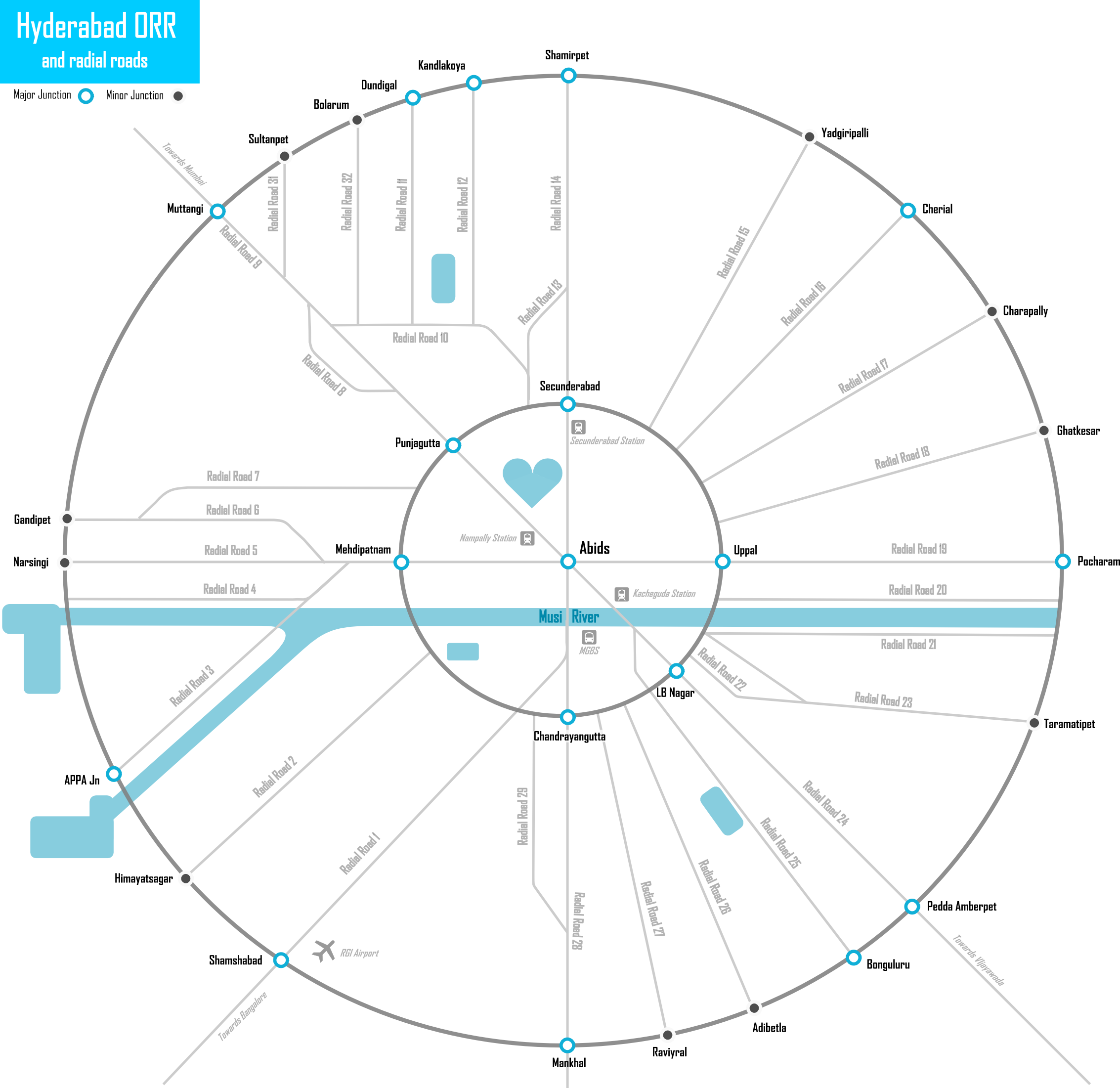
The Hyderabad Radial Roads

Radial Road #	Starting Point	Via	Ending Point	Road Length	Lanes
RR 1 (NH 44)	Aramghar Jn		Umda Nagar/Kamuni Cheruvu	12 kilometres (7.5 mi)	4
RR 2	Prof Jaya Shankar Agri University		Himayath Sagar	6.6 kilometres (4.1 mi)	4
RR 3 (SH)	Rethibowli Jn		TSPA Jn	10.5 kilometres (6.5 mi)	6
RR 4	Cantonment Y Jn @ Langar House		Gandipet T Junction	6.8 kilometres (4.2 mi)	4
RR 5	Shaikpet (RR 6)		Kokapet (near Narsingi)	6.00 kilometres (3.73 mi)	4
RR 6	Nanal Nagar Jn (RR 3)		HCU Depot, Gachibowli		4
RR 7	Tellapur		Edulanagulapally	6.60 kilometres (4.10 mi)	4
RR 7 Ext	Edulanagulapally		Nagulapally R.S.	4.60 kilometres (2.86 mi)	4
RR 8	Moosapet	Hafeezpet, Manjeera Pipeline Rd	BHEL Jn on RR 9 (NH 9)	7.40 kilometres (4.60 mi)	4
RR 9 (NH 9)	Punjagutta	Miyapur	Muttangi at Nehru-ORR	29 kilometres (18 mi)	4
RR 10	Paradise Jn-I (Bowenpally Jn) (RR 13)		Godrej ‘Y’ Jn on RR 9 (NH 9)	2.00 kilometres (1.24 mi)	4
RR 11 (SH)	Jeedimetla		Saregudem at Nehru-ORR	8.55 kilometres (5.31 mi)	4
RR 12 (NH 44)	Old Bowenpally (RR 10)		Kandlakoya at Nehru-ORR	16.45 kilometres (10.22 mi)	4
RR 13	Cantonment Jn (Secunderabad)		Old Alwal (RR 14)	11.60 kilometres (7.21 mi)	4
RR 14	Patny Jn		Shameerpet at Nehru-ORR	17.75 kilometres (11.03 mi)	4
RR 15	Radhika Jn		Yadgarpally Jn at Nehru-ORR	15.15 kilometres (9.41 mi)	4
RR 16	ECIL X Roads		Cheriyal X Road at Nehru-ORR	10.18 kilometres (6.33 mi)	4
RR 17	Habsiguda		Bogaram Jn at Nehru-ORR	19.00 kilometres (11.81 mi)	4
RR 18	Survey of India		Medipally on NH-202 (RR-19)	12.00 kilometres (7.46 mi)	4
RR 19 (NH 163)	Uppal Jn		Annojiguda at Nehru-ORR	13.9 kilometres (8.6 mi)	4
RR 20	Nagole Bridge		Singaram at Nehru-ORR	14.00 kilometres (8.70 mi)	4
RR 21	Nagole Bridge		Gourelly at Nehru-ORR	14.00 kilometres (8.70 mi)	4
RR 22	Nagole Jn		Gowerelly X Road at Nehru-ORR	14.75 kilometres (9.17 mi)	4
RR 23	Mansoorabad		Thattiannavaram X Rd	4.80 kilometres (2.98 mi)	4
RR 24 (NH 65)	LB Nagar Jn		Pedda Amberpet at Nehru-ORR	12 kilometres (7.5 mi)	4
RR 25	Bairamuluguda		Bongulur Gate at Nehru-ORR	13.24 kilometres (8.23 mi)	6
RR 26	Kanchanbagh		Nadergul (Adibatla) at Nehru-ORR	15.50 kilometres (9.63 mi)	4
RR 27	Midhani Junction		Near to Pahadi Shareef (on RR -28)	18.30 kilometres (11.37 mi)	4
RR 28	Pahadisherif Police Station		Tukkuguda at Nehru-ORR	7.29 kilometres (4.53 mi)	6
RR 29	Laxmiguda X Roads		Mamidipally (RR 28)	7.74 kilometres (4.81 mi)	4
RR 30	HCU Depot		Vattinagulapally	8.57 kilometres (5.33 mi)	4
RR 30 Extn	Gopanpally thanda		Kollur Jn at ORR	7.14 kilometres (4.44 mi)	4
RR 31	Taranagar (Chandanagar)		Davaraguda at Nehru-ORR	8.90 kilometres (5.53 mi)	4
RR 32	Nizampet X Road		Near to Kazipalle at Nehru-ORR	9.00 kilometres (5.59 mi)	4
RR 33	Extn Financial District, Gachibowli		Kokapet (near Narsingi)	1.55 kilometres (0.96 mi)	4

== See also ==
- Unified Metropolitan Transportation Authority, Hyderabad (India)
- Inner Ring Road, Hyderabad
- Radial Roads, Hyderabad (India)
- Elevated Expressways in Hyderabad
- Intermediate Ring Road, Hyderabad (India)
- Outer Ring Road, Hyderabad
- Regional Ring Road
