= Thurkaguda =

Thurkaguda thurka gudem
- Village
- Country: India
- State: Telangana

Government
  - Type: Democracy

Languages
  - Official: Telugu
- Time zone: UTC+5:30 (IST)
- Telephone code: 918414
- Vehicle registration: TS 07 X XXXX

Thurkaguda is a village in Ranga Reddy district in Telangana, India. It falls under Ibrahimpatnam mandal. One of the producers of dairy, vegetables to Hyderabad city.
