= Tulekalan =

- Village
- Interactive map of Tulekalan
- Coordinates: 17°6′1.873″N 78°37′45.211″E
- Country: India
- State: Telangana

Languages
  - Official: Telugu
- Time zone: UTC+5:30 (IST)
- Postal code: 501509
- Telephone code: 040
- Vehicle registration: AP 26 X XXXX

Tulekalan is a village in Ranga Reddy district in Telanagan, India. It falls under Ibrahimpatnam mandal.
