= Nazdik Singaram =

Coordinates: 17°02′N 78°36′E

- Village
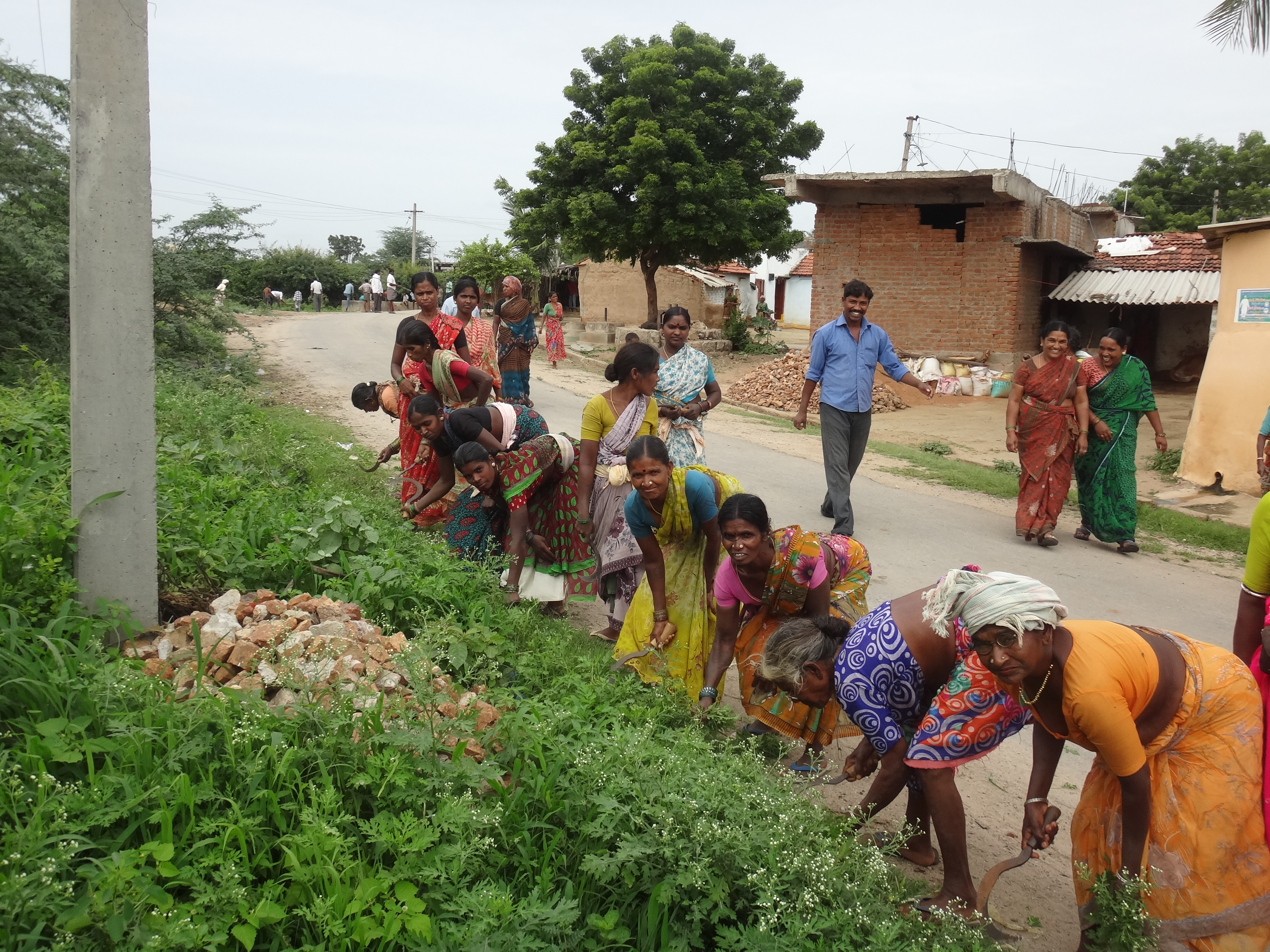
- Nazdik Singaram Shramadhanam
- Interactive map of Nazdik Singaram
- Country: India
- State: Telangana

Languages
  - Official: Telugu
- Time zone: UTC+5:30 (IST)
- Telephone code: 040
- Vehicle registration: TS 07 X XXXX

Nazdik Singaram is a village in Ranga Reddy district in Telangana, India. It falls under Yacharam mandal. The village is undergoing transformation with the active participation of the youth and the guidance of the senior citizens. The basic source of living is the agriculture and dairy. The villagers are into various sectors like electronic media, IT industry, and Pharmaceutical industry.

== Images ==
=== Shramadhanam August 2013 ===
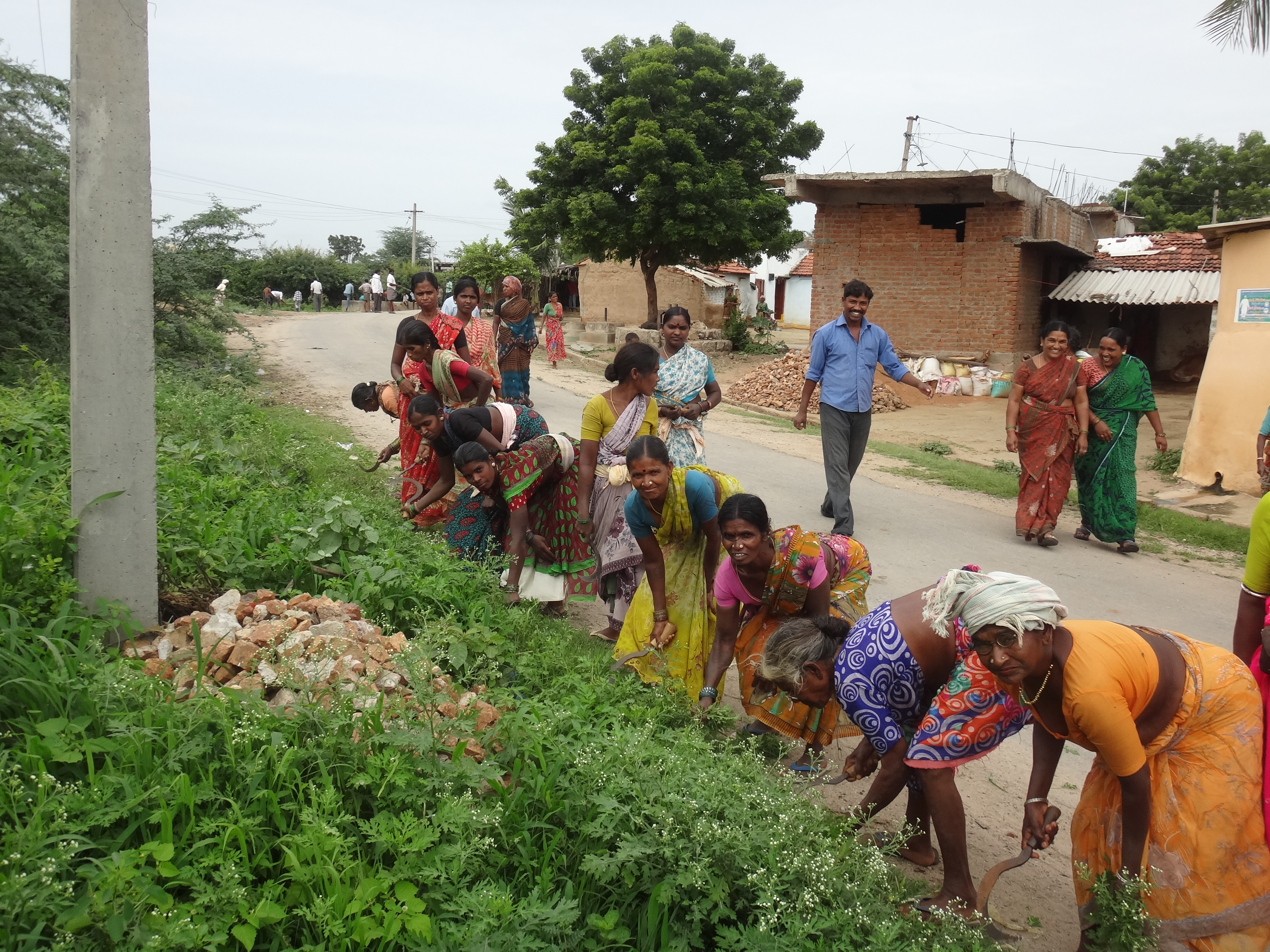
Shramadhanam August 10, 2013

=== Independence Day 2013 ===
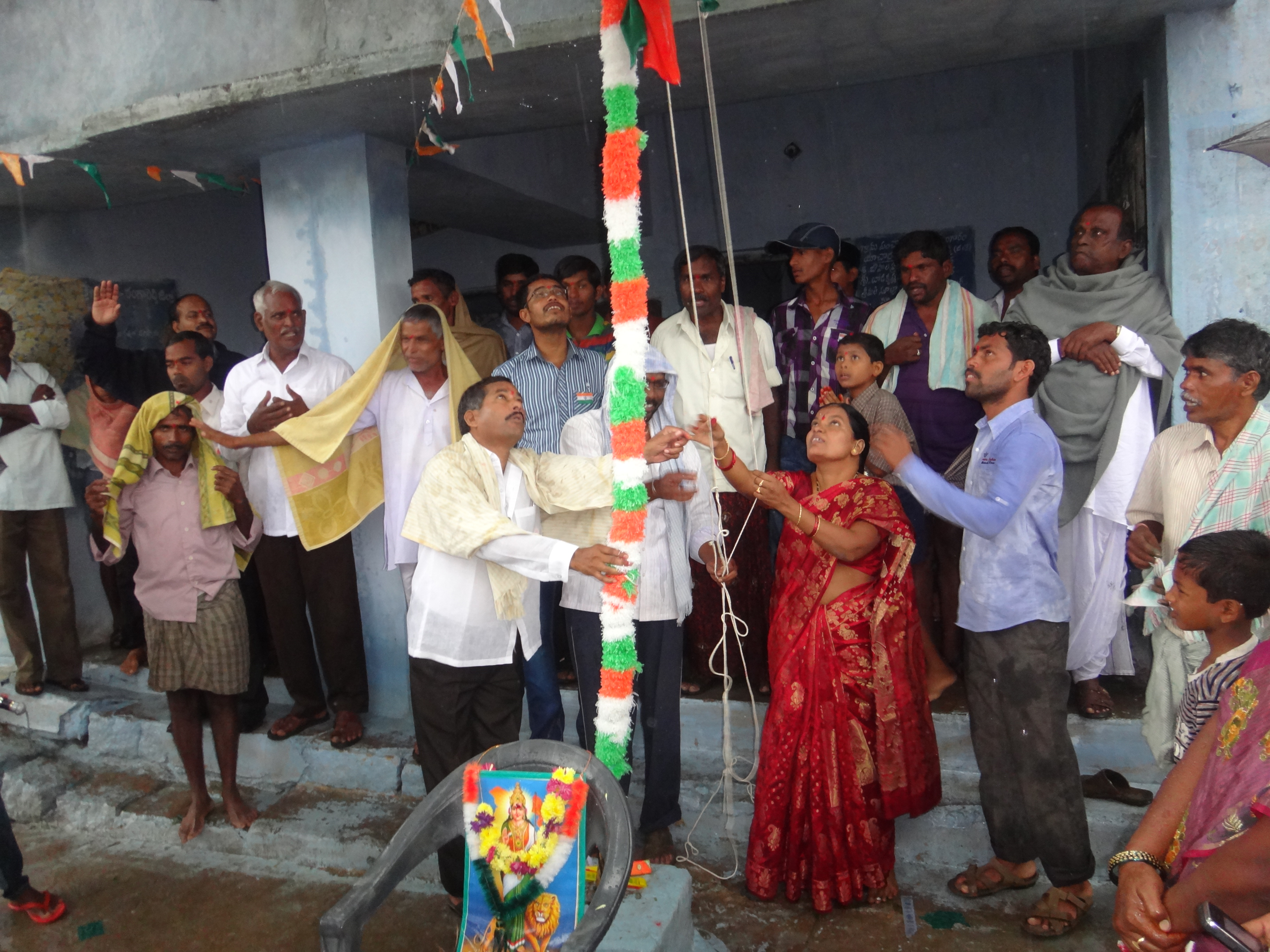
Flag Hoisting

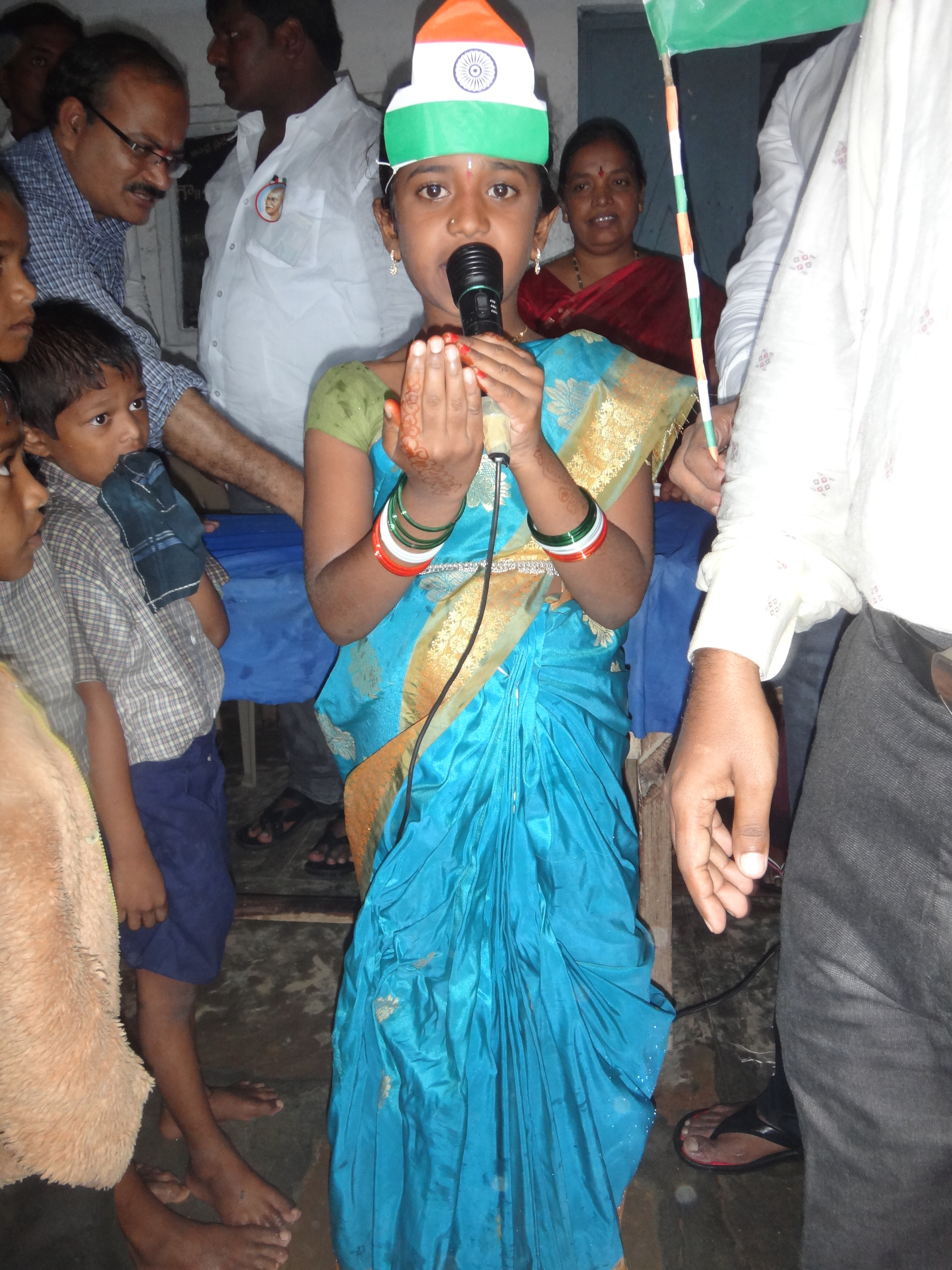
Bharath Matha

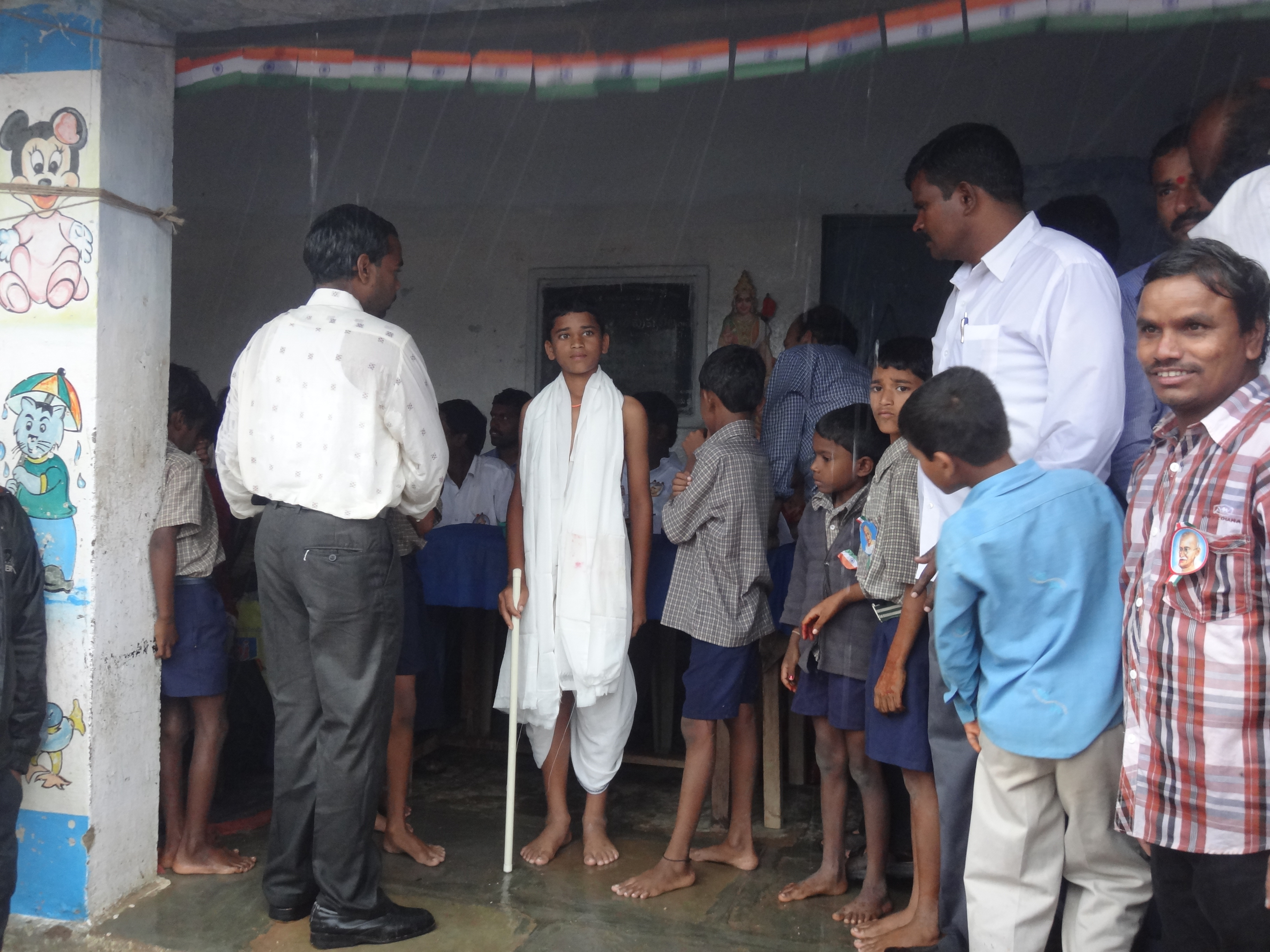
Gandhiji

== Panoramic view ==
https://maps.google.co.in/maps?ll=17.040045,78.607199&spn=0.005006,0.009645&t=h&z=17&lci=com.panoramio.all
