= Chowder Pally =

- Village
- Location in Telangana, India Chowder Pally (India)
- Coordinates: 17.58232929°N 78.80022707°E
- Country: India
- State: Telangana

Languages
  - Official: Telugu
- Time zone: UTC+5:30 (IST)
- Vehicle registration: TS 08 X XXXX

Chowder Pally is a village in Yacharam mandal of Ranga Reddy district, Telangana, India.
