= Intermediate Ring Road, Hyderabad =

Types of roads in Hyderabad, India

Route information
- Maintained by Greater Hyderabad Municipal Corporation, Hyderabad Metropolitan Development Authority

Location
- Country: India
- State: Telangana

Highway system
- Roads in India; Expressways; National; State; Asian; State Highways in Telangana

The Intermediate Ring Road are roads identified as the main connecting roads between various radial roads in Hyderabad, Telangana, India. It complements the inner and outer ring roads, acting as a bypass, when traveling from one end of the city to the other, helping reduce travel time.

== Intermediate Ring Roads ==
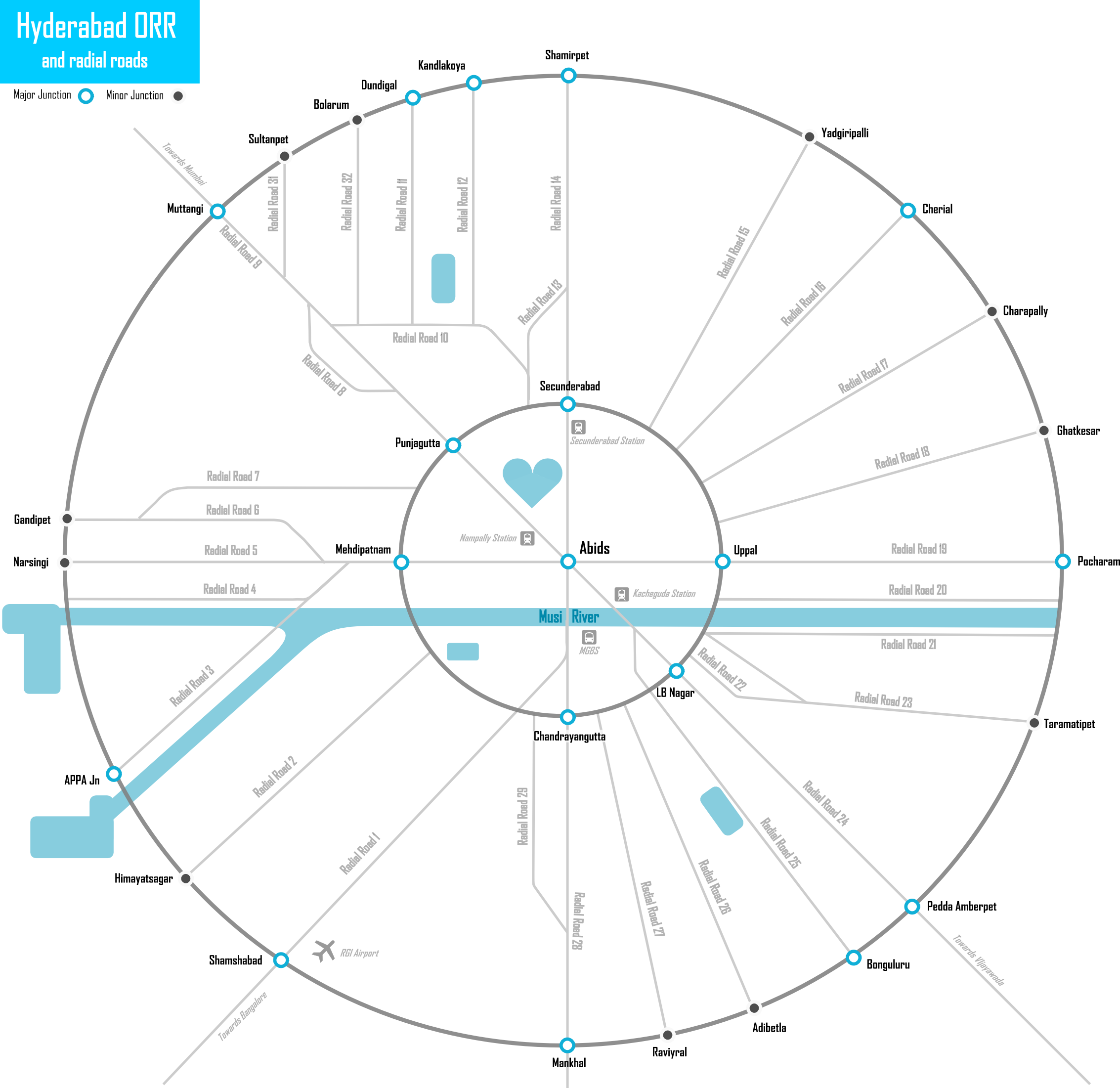
The Hyderabad Radial Roads

- Intermediate ring roads in Hyderabad

Intermediate Ring Road #	Starting Point	Via	Ending Point	Road Length	Lanes
IMRR 1 (Old Bombay Road)	Rethibowli (RR 3 & RR 6)	RR 5	Gachibowli (Nehru-ORR & RR 6 & RR 33)		
IMRR 2	Gachibowli (Nehru-ORR & RR 6)	RR 7, RR 8	Miyapur (RR 9)		
IMRR 3	Miyapur (RR 9)	RR 32, Gandi Maisamma, RR 11 & Bhadurpally	Kompally at RR 12 (NH7)		

== See also ==
- Unified Metropolitan Transportation Authority, Hyderabad (India)
- Inner Ring Road, Hyderabad
- Radial Roads, Hyderabad (India)
- Elevated Expressways in Hyderabad
- Intermediate Ring Road, Hyderabad (India)
- Outer Ring Road, Hyderabad
- Regional Ring Road
