= Kappapahad =

Kappapahad Kappadu Kappadu
- Village
- Country: India
- State: Telangana

Languages
  - Official: Telugu
- Time zone: UTC+5:30 (IST)
- Postal code: 501506
- Telephone code: 040
- Vehicle registration: AP 26 X XXXX

Kappapahad is a village in Ranga Reddy district in Telangana, India. It falls under Ibrahimpatnam mandal.
