= Kurmidda =

- Village
- Country: India
- State: Telangana

Languages
  - Official: Telugu
- Time zone: UTC+5:30 (IST)
- Telephone code: 040
- Vehicle registration: TS 26 X XXXX
- Website: telangana.gov.in

Kurmidda is a village in Ranga Reddy district in Telangana, India. It falls under Yacharam mandal. 1,738 acres of land from Kurmidda village are being acquired under Hyderabad Pharma City

== History ==
This village has a history of more than 300 years.

== Geography ==
This village falls under Yacharam Mandal. The longitude and latitude of this village is 17.032486, 78.573836.

== Transport ==
The only mode of transportation to this village from the city is provided by Telangana State Road Transport Corporation

== Schools ==
The primary and secondary school education is imparted by the government, aided and private schools, under the School Education Department of the state. The medium of instruction followed by different schools are in English, and Telugu.
