= Dandu Mailaram =

Coordinates: 17°14′N 78°46′E

Dandumailaram
- Village
- Nickname: DMR
- Interactive map of Dandumailaram
- Country: India
- State: Telangana

Area
  - Total: 3 km^{2} (1.2 sq mi)

Population (2001)
  - Total: 16,000
  - Density: 5,300/km^{2} (14,000/sq mi)

Languages
  - Official: Telugu
- Time zone: UTC+5:30 (IST)
- Telephone code: 08414
- Vehicle registration: TS-26 X XXXX

Dandu Mailaram is a village in Rangareddy district in Telangana, India. It falls under Ibrahimpatnam mandal. It has a great history in Kakatiya Rulers. Just beside the village Rachakonda kingdom established by Padmanayaka Velama kings, The Famous king of Rachakonda Sri. Singhama Bhupala Constructed the historical Shivalayam in Dandumailaram Village. Shiva Lingam and Nandeeshwara status attract the attention of people. Dandu <ailaram is urbanising with rapid growth of income earned by people with agriculture as a major sector of profession. For the financial needs of the villagers there are two banks: Primary Agriculture Co-Operative Society Rachakonda Mailaram and Telangana Grameena Bank. Dandumailaram is very close to Telangana state capital city Hyderabad with a distance of 30 km and well connected to Its Mandal and Division Headquarters Ibrahimpatnam i.e. Nagarjuna Sagar state Highway as well as Hyderabad-Vijayawada National Highway. Ramoji Film City is just 10 km away from the village.

There are two government schools in Dadumailaram; one is primary school and the other is high school in which both Telugu medium and English medium are taught. Dandumailaram village also has a government hospital.
