= Bongloor =

- Village
- Interactive map of Bongloor
- Coordinates: 17.23°N 78.58°E
- Country: India
- State: Telangana
- District: Ranga Reddy
- Metro: Rangareddy district

Government
  - Body: Mandal Office

Languages
  - Official: Telugu
- Time zone: UTC+5:30 (IST)
- PIN: 501510
- Vehicle registration: TS
- Lok Sabha constituency: Bhongir
- Vidhan Sabha constituency: Ibrahimpatnam
- Planning agency: Panchayat
- Civic agency: Mandal Office
- Website: telangana.gov.in

Bongloor is a village and panchayat in Rangareddy district, Telangana, India. It comes under Ibrahimpatnam mandal.

It is 5 kilometers away from Hyderabad city. The Outer Ring Road, Hyderabad is passing through this village and has a major junction located here. State Bank of Hyderabad has its branch in the village. It was one of the three options for the site of the Hyderabad Airport, the others being Nadergul and Shamshabad, the selected location.

== Education ==
Visvesvaraya College of Engineering and Technology has its campus at Bongloor crossroads.

== Transport ==
- 277^{T},403,436 from Imlibun Bus Station
- 279 from Secunderabad

Rajiv Gandhi International Airport is 29 kilometers away.
