= Uppariguda =

- Village
- Interactive map of Uppariguda
- Coordinates: 17.1901°N 78.6136°E
- Country: India
- State: TELANGANA

Languages
  - Official: Telugu
- Time zone: UTC+5:30 (IST)
- Postal code: 501506
- Telephone code: 040
- Vehicle registration: TS 07 x XXXX

Uppariguda is a village in Ranga Reddy district in Telangana, India. It falls under Ibrahimpatnam mandal.
