= Inner Ring Road, Hyderabad =

- Hyderabad Inner Ring Road in red

Route information
- Maintained by Greater Hyderabad Municipal Corporation, Hyderabad Metropolitan Development Authority
- Length: 50 km (31 mi)

Location
- Country: India
- State: Telangana

Highway system
- Roads in India; Expressways; National; State; Asian; State Highways in Telangana

The Hyderabad Inner Ring Road is a 50 kilometer city arterial road in Hyderabad, Telangana. It was built to decongest city roads and give way for trucks and other commercial vehicles.

== History ==
HIRR's master plan called as Intelligent Transport System was done by Nippon Koei india private Limited of Japan. The project which includes the Outer Ring Road, Hyderabad, has been implemented with assistance from Japanese International Cooperation Agency (JICA) and its construction has finished in 2008.

== The Road ==
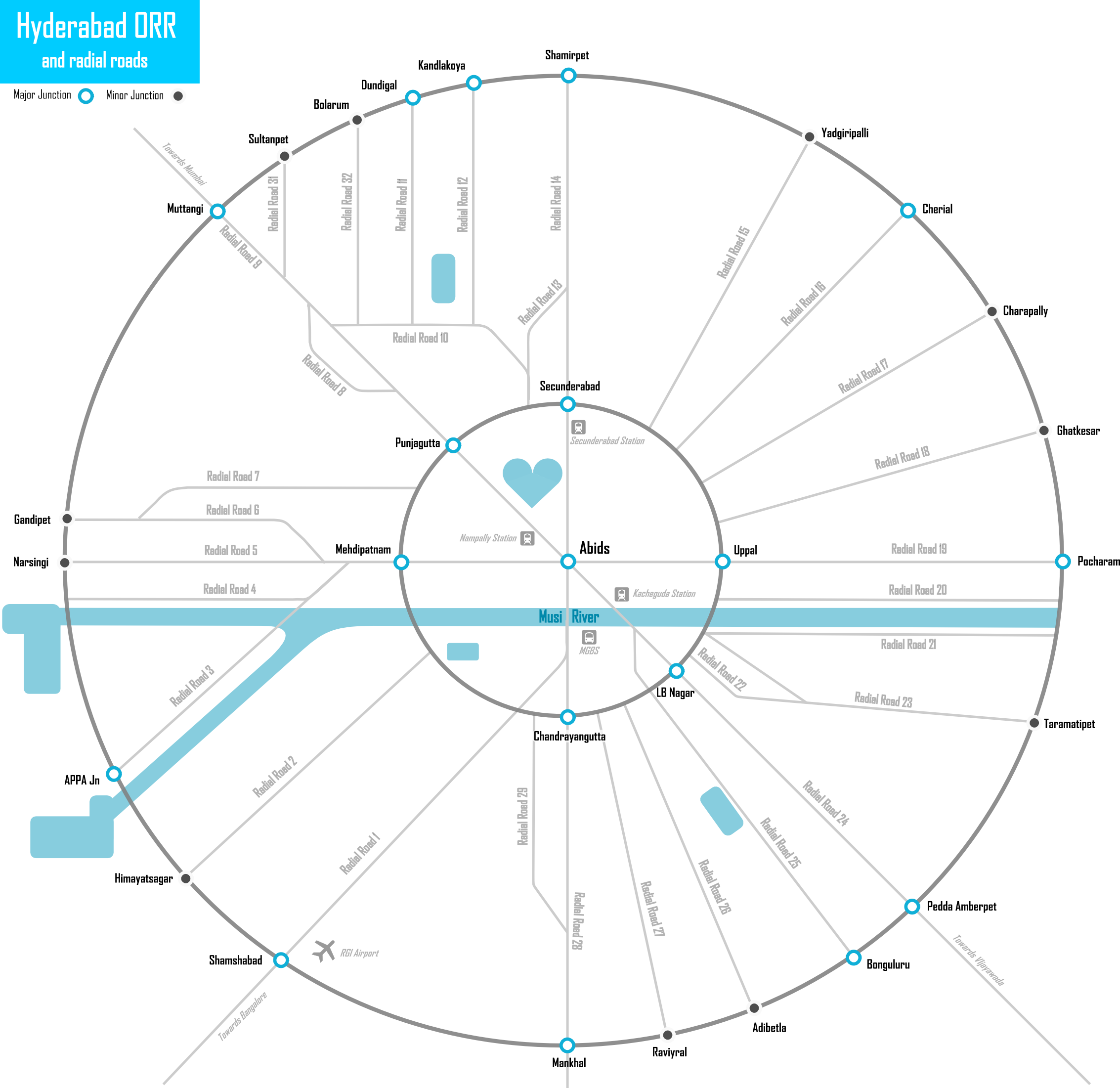
Inner Ring Road

The road passes through Mehdipatnam including Masab Tank, Banjara Hills, NH 65 via Punjagutta, NH 44 via Begumpet, Mettuguda, Tarnaka, Habsiguda, Uppal, NH163 via Bhuvanagiri road, Nagole, L. B. Nagar, karmanghat, champapet, Santoshnagar crossroads, NH 765 via Chandrayangutta, Kurnool highway, Rajendranagar bypass road, via SH 2 Attapur, RethBowli. The road joins the P. V. Narasimha Rao Expressway at Aramgarh.

== See also ==
- Unified Metropolitan Transportation Authority, Hyderabad (India)
- Radial Roads, Hyderabad (India)
- Elevated Expressways in Hyderabad
- Intermediate Ring Road, Hyderabad (India)
- Outer Ring Road, Hyderabad
- Regional Ring Road, Hyderabad
