= Chintapatla =

- Village
- Interactive map of Chintapatla
- Country: India
- State: Telangana

Government
  - Type: Panchayathiraj

Languages
  - Official: Telugu
- Time zone: UTC+5:30 (IST)
- Postal code: 501509
- Telephone code: 08414
- Vehicle registration: TS 07 X XXXX

Chintapatla is a village in Ranga Reddy district in Telangana, India. It falls under Yacharam mandal.

== Demographics ==
Chintapatla is a village situated in Yacharam mandal of Rangareddy district in Telangana. As per the Population Census 2011, there are a total of 937 families residing in the village Chintapatla. The total population of Chintapatla is 3,990 out of which 2,051 are males and 1,939 are females thus the Average Sex Ratio of Chintapatla is 945.

The population of Children aged 0-6 years in Chintapatla village is 417 which is 10% of the total population. There are 214 male children and 203 female children between the age 0-6 years. Thus as per the Census 2011 the Child Sex Ratio of Chintapatla is 949 which is greater than Average Sex Ratio (945) of Chintapatla village.

As per the Census 2011, the literacy rate of Chintapatla is 58.2%. Thus Chintapatla village has a lower literacy rate

As per constitution of India and Panchyati Raaj Act (Amendment 1998), Chintapatla village is administrated by Sarpanch (Head of Village) who is elected representative of the village.

As per the Population Census 2011 data, following are some quick facts about Chintapatla village.

	Total	Male	Female
Children	417	214	203
Literacy	58.16%	70.28%	45.33%
Scheduled Caste	1,059	532	527
Scheduled Tribe	19	9	10
Illiterate	1,912	760	1,152

=== Working population ===
In Chintapatla village out of total population, 2,148 were engaged in work activities. 89.5% of workers describe their work as Main Work (Employment or Earning more than 6 Months) while 10.5% were involved in Marginal activity providing livelihood for less than 6 months. Of 2,148 workers engaged in Main Work, 612 were cultivators (owner or co-owner) while 808 were Agricultural labourers.

	Total	Male	Female
Main Workers	1,923	1,123	800
Cultivators	612	428	184
Agriculture Labourer	808	295	513
Household Industries	14	10	4
Other Workers	489	390	99
Marginal Workers	225	50	175
Non Working	1,842	878	964
