= ThakkallaPally =

- Village
- Country: India
- State: Andhra Pradesh

Languages
  - Official: Telugu
- Time zone: UTC+5:30 (IST)
- Telephone code: 040
- Vehicle registration: AP 26 X XXXX

ThakkallaPally is a village in Ranga Reddy district in Andhra Pradesh, India. It falls under Yacharam mandal.
