= Kollur, Ranga Reddy district =

Kollur
- Village
- Country: India
- State: Telangana
- District: Sangareddy district

Government
  - Type: Mandal Office
  - Body: Ramachandra Puram

Languages
  - Official: Telugu
- Time zone: UTC+5:30 (IST)
- Planning agency: Panchayat
- Civic agency: Mandal Office

Kollur is a village and panchayat in Sangareddy district, Telangana, India. The Outer Ring Road, Hyderabad is passing through and has a major junction in the village.

It is 35 km away from Hyderabad.
