= Goudavelly, Ranga Reddy district =

Coordinates: 17°36′43″N 78°27′55″E

Goudavelly
- Village
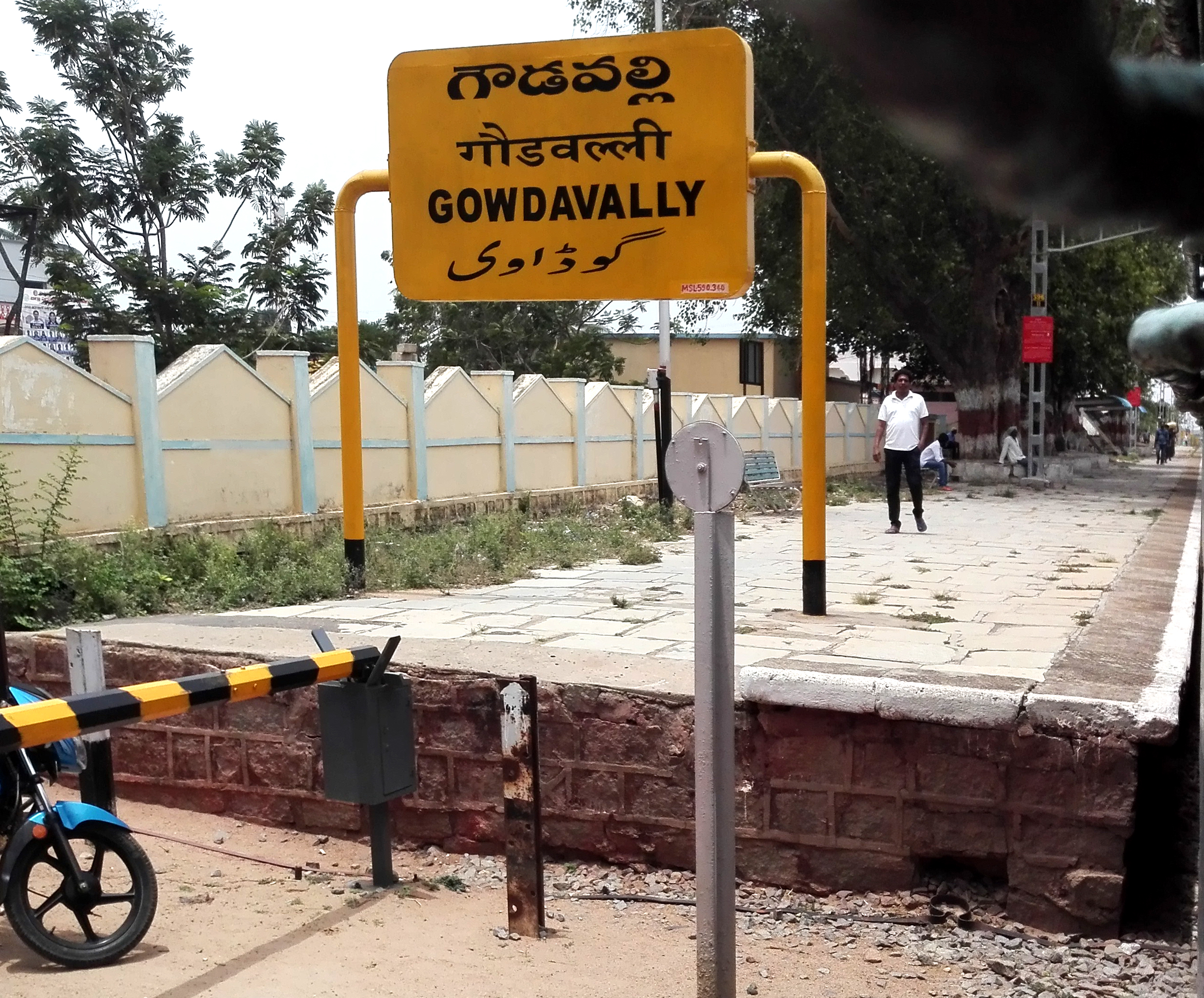
- Interactive map of Goudavelly
- Country: India
- State: Telangana
- District: Ranga Reddy
- Metro: Ranga Reddy district

Government
  - Body: Mandal Office

Languages
  - Official: Telugu
- Time zone: UTC+5:30 (IST)
- Lok Sabha constituency: Medak
- Vidhan Sabha constituency: Medchal
- Planning agency: Panchayat
- Civic agency: Mandal Office

Goudavelly (Gowdavally) also Goudelli is a village and panchayat in Ranga Reddy district, Telangana, India. It comes under Medchal mandal.

It is 15 kilometers away from Secunderabad. The Outer Ring Road, Hyderabad has a major junction in this village.
