= P. V. Narasimha Rao Expressway =

Road connecting the Hyderabad International Airport with Mehdipatnam

- P.V. Narasimha Rao Expressway Map
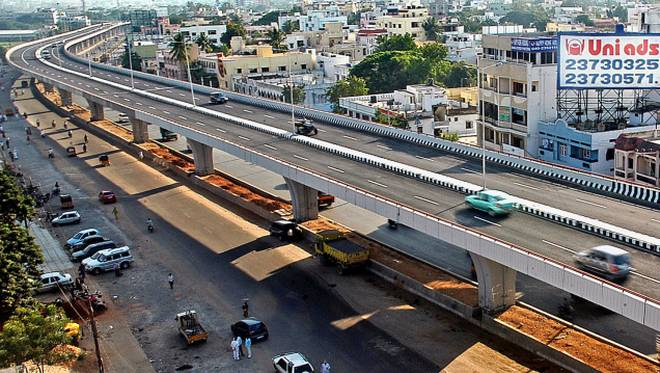
- A part of P.V. Narasimha Rao Expressway in Rajendra Nagar

Route information
- Length: 11.6 km (7.2 mi)
- Existed: 2009; 17 years ago–present

Location
- Country: India
- Major cities: Hyderabad, India

Highway system
- Roads in India; Expressways; National; State; Asian

P. V. Narasimha Rao Expressway is an 11.6 km long elevated road connecting the Hyderabad International Airport with Mehdipatnam. Chief minister Y. S. Rajasekhara Reddy laid the foundation stone for the project. It was opened to the traffic at the end points on 19 October 2009. The entry for cyclists, two and three-wheelers, three and four-wheeled seven seater and goods vehicles is prohibited.

== History ==
When the construction of the Rajiv Gandhi International Airport started in March 2005, the erstwhile Government of Andhra Pradesh came up with a plan to provide implement a Traffic signal free route from the city to Shamshabad. The 3 routes which lead to Shamshabad from the city were NH44 (NH7) via Nehru Zoological Park, Srisailam Highway (NH765) and the Inner Ring Road, Hyderabad via Mehdipatnam. Out of the 3 routes, the NH44 already had a very high volumes of traffic and was not in a position to withstand any further rise in the traffic. The Srisailam Highway is not accessible to the Western part of the city, which houses prominent localities like Banjara Hills, Jubilee Hills, Punjagutta and some others. The Inner Ring Road, Hyderabad was a wide 6-Lane road, which barely served any traffic. Construction of an elevated highway over this road was very easy and the Government chose to develop this route, leaving behind the former routes.

The initial plan was to widen this road to 8-lane, but was later changed to construct a 4-Lane elevated expressway. The construction began in October 2005, with an intention to complete the project in 28 months. But due to the financial difficulties, the construction work was dragged and was opened on October 19, 2009. It was last scheduled to be opened on October 2 but the inauguration was put off in view of the death of chief minister Y. S. Rajasekhara Reddy, who had laid the foundation stone for the project. The Expressway starts at Sarojini Devi Eye Hospital in Mehdipatnam and merges with NH44 near Aramghar. The total cost was estimated to be 400 crores INR but later extended to 500 crores INR.

== Entry and exit ramps ==
The earlier design of the expressway did not have any ramps for entry and exit except at the two ends.The design was later modified and three sets of Entry and Exit ramps were constructed. The 6 sets of ramps are constructed at the below junctions.

- Lakshmi Nagar Junction
- Budvel Junction
- Aramghar Junction
- Upperpally

== See also ==
- Unified Metropolitan Transportation Authority, Hyderabad (India)
- Inner Ring Road, Hyderabad
- Radial Roads, Hyderabad (India)
- Intermediate Ring Road, Hyderabad (India)
- Outer Ring Road, Hyderabad
- Regional Ring Road
- List of Flyovers in Hyderabad
