= Narsingi, Ranga Reddy district =

Narsingi
- Census town
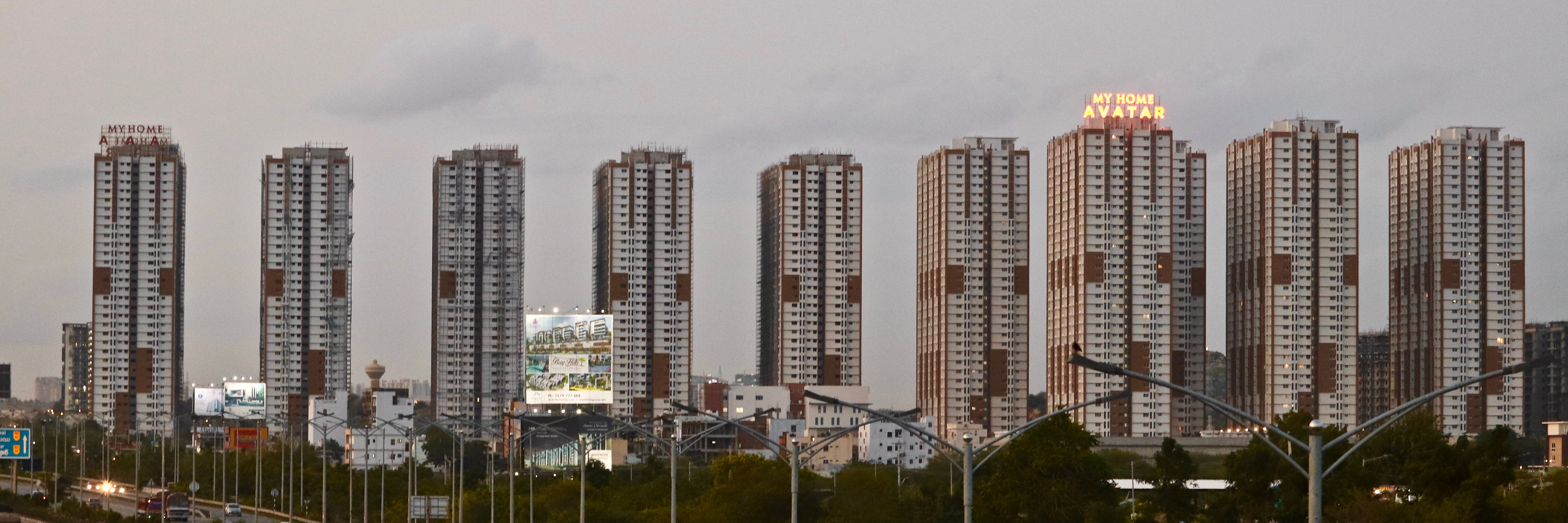
- High rise buildings as seen from Nehru Outer Ring road at Narsingi

- Location in Hyderabad Telangana Location in India
- Coordinates: 17°23′15.4″N 78°21′25.3″E
- Country: India
- State: Telangana
- District: Ranga Reddy

Government
  - Type: State

Area
  - Total: 6.90 km^{2} (2.66 sq mi)

Population (2011)
  - Total: 9,449
  - Density: 1,370/km^{2} (3,550/sq mi)

Languages
  - Official: Telugu
- Time zone: UTC+5:30 (IST)
- Vehicle registration: TG

Narsingi is an Indian satellite town of Hyderabad in Ranga Reddy district of Telangana state. It is in the administrative headquarters of Gandipet mandal. Several high rise residential towers like My Home Avatar, PWS 7 Hills etc. are located in Narsingi. The Outer Ring Road, Hyderabad has a junction there. A few of the tallest buildings in Hyderabad are located in Narsingi, with Vasavi Atlantis being the tallest among them.

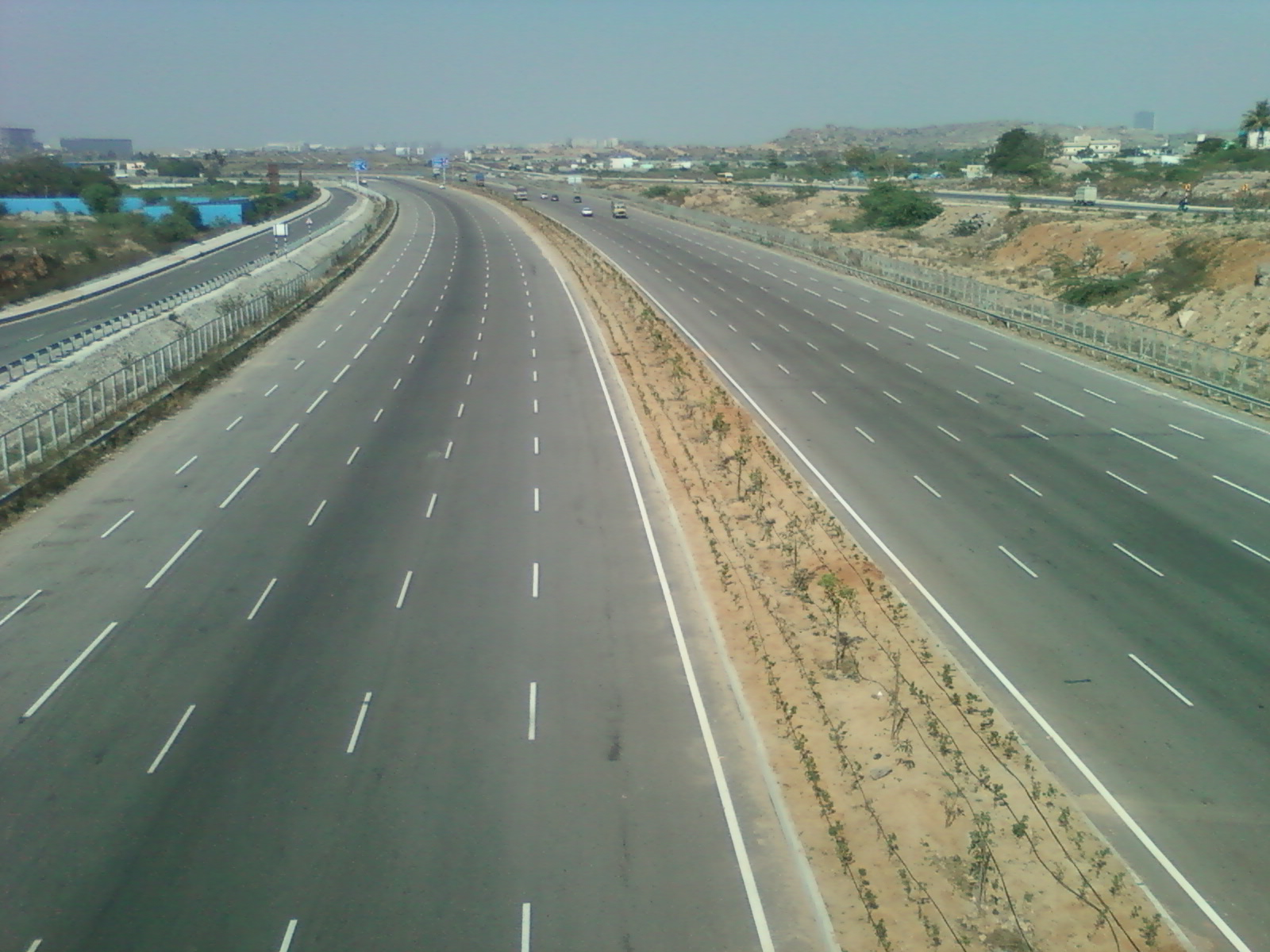
Outer Ring Road at Narsingi

== Demographics ==
As of 2011 India census, Narsingi had a population of 9449 of which 4,551 are males and 4,898 females. Narsingi has an average literacy rate of 78.30%, higher than state average of 67.02%. In Narsingi, male literacy is around 80.89% while female literacy rate is 75.96%. In Narsingi, 14% of the population is under 6 years of age.
