= List of longest ring roads =

This article lists some of the longest ring roads in the world.

Name	Other names	Distance (miles)	Distance (kilometers)	Year completed	Location	Country	Ref.
Highway 1 (Australia)		9,010	14,500	1955		Australia	
Golden Quadrilateral (GQ)	Svarnim Chaturbhuj	3,633	5,846	2001	Delhi (north) to Kolkata (east) to Chennai (south) to Mumbai (west) to Delhi	India	
Afghanistan Ring Road	A01	1,300	2,092	2003		Afghanistan	
Golden Ring Federal Highway	Р-132	941	1515	2020		Russia	
Route 1		828	1,332	1974		Iceland	
G95 Capital Area Loop Expressway	Beijing 7th Ring Road	584	940	2016	Beijing Capital Area	China	
G98 Hainan Island Ring Expressway	Hainan Region Ring Expressway	381	613	2012	Hainan	China	
Moscow Big Ring Road	A108	340	547	1960s	Moscow, Moscow Oblast	Russia	
Chongqing 3rd Ring Expressway		265	427	2021	Chongqing	China	
G91 Central Liaoning Ring Expressway	Central Liaoning Ring Expressway	249	400	2018	Shenyang	China	
Regional Ring Road		226	364	2018	Greater Cairo	Egypt	
Moscow Small Ring Road	A107	215	347	1960s	Moscow, Moscow Oblast	Russia	
Peripheral Expressway; Western Peripheral Expressway; Eastern Peripheral Expressway		168	270	2018	National Capital Region	India	
Beijing 6th Ring Road	G4501	140	220	2010	Beijing	China	
Chengdu Second Ring Expressway		139	223	2013	Chengdu	China	
G1503 Shanghai Ring Expressway		130	209	2008	Shanghai	China	
Bundesautobahn 10	A10	122	196	1936-1979	Berlin/Brandenburg Metropolitan Region	Germany	
M25 motorway	London Orbital Motorway	117	188	1975-1986	Greater London, England	United Kingdom	
G4201 Wuhan Ring Expressway		117	188	2012	Wuhan	China	
Rodoanel Mário Covas		110	177	2002-2019	Greater São Paulo	Brazil	
Kanchanaphisek Road	Bangkok Outer Ring Road	105	169	1978-2019	Bangkok Metropolitan Region	Thailand	
Outer Ring Road, Hyderabad	O.R.R.	98	158	2018	Hyderabad	India	
Texas State Highway Loop 1604	Charles W. Anderson Loop	94	151	1977	San Antonio, Texas	United States	
Saint Petersburg Ring Road	A118	88	142	2011	Saint Petersburg	Russia	
Texas State Highway Beltway 8	Sam Houston Tollway/Parkway	88	141	1983	Greater Houston, Texas	United States	
Interstate 275 (Ohio–Indiana–Kentucky)	Cincinnati Bypass Donald H. Rolf Circle Freeway Ronald Reagan Freeway "The Loop"	83.71	134.72	1962	Cincinnati metropolitan area, Ohio-Kentucky-Indiana	United States	
Capital Region First Ring Expressway	Expressway No.100	79.55	128.02	1991-2007	Incheon-Gyeonggi Province-Seoul	South Korea	
Interstate 285 (Georgia)	The Perimeter, Atlanta Bypass	63.98	102.97	1969	Atlanta, Georgia	United States	
Interstate 485 (North Carolina)	Charlotte Outerbelt	66.68	107.31	2015	Charlotte, North Carolina	United States	
Interstate 495 (Washington DC)	Capital Beltway	64	103	1964	Washington, D.C.	United States	
Stoney Trail	Alberta Provincial Highway No. 201 Tsuut'ina Trail Calgary Ring Road	63	101	1995-2023	Calgary, Alberta	Canada	
Interstate 270 (Ohio)	Jack Nicklaus freeway The Outerbelt	54.97	88.47	1976	Columbus, Ohio	United States	
Ranchi Ring Road		53	86	2023	Ranchi	India	
Périphérique d'Île-de-France	A86	50	80	1968	Banlieue de Paris, Île-de-France	France	

== Under construction ==
- Central Yunnan Urban Economic Ring Expressway, over 300 kilometres (186 mi) completed.
- G93 Chengyu Ring Expressway, planned length of 1,057 kilometres (657 mi).
- Chengdu Economic Zone Ring Expressway, planned length of 438 kilometres (272 mi).
- Texas State Highway 99, planned length of 184 miles (296 km).
- Hyderabad Regional Ring Road, planned length of 330 km (205 mi).
- Satellite Town Ring Road, Bangalore under construction length of 280 km (170 mi).
- Outer Ring Road, Ranchi, planned length of 195 km (121 mi).
- Capital Region Second Ring Expressway, planned length of 263.4 kilometres (164 mi).
- Changchun Metropolitan Ring Expressway, planned length of 372 kilometres (231 mi).
- Chennai Peripheral Ring Road, planned length of 133 km (82 mi).
- Lahore Ring Road (L-20) SL-4 (Southern Loop 4) under construction.
