= Outer Ring Road, Hyderabad =

Ring road expressway encircling the City of Hyderabad

- Nehru Outer Ring Road
- Hyderabad Outer Ring Road in red
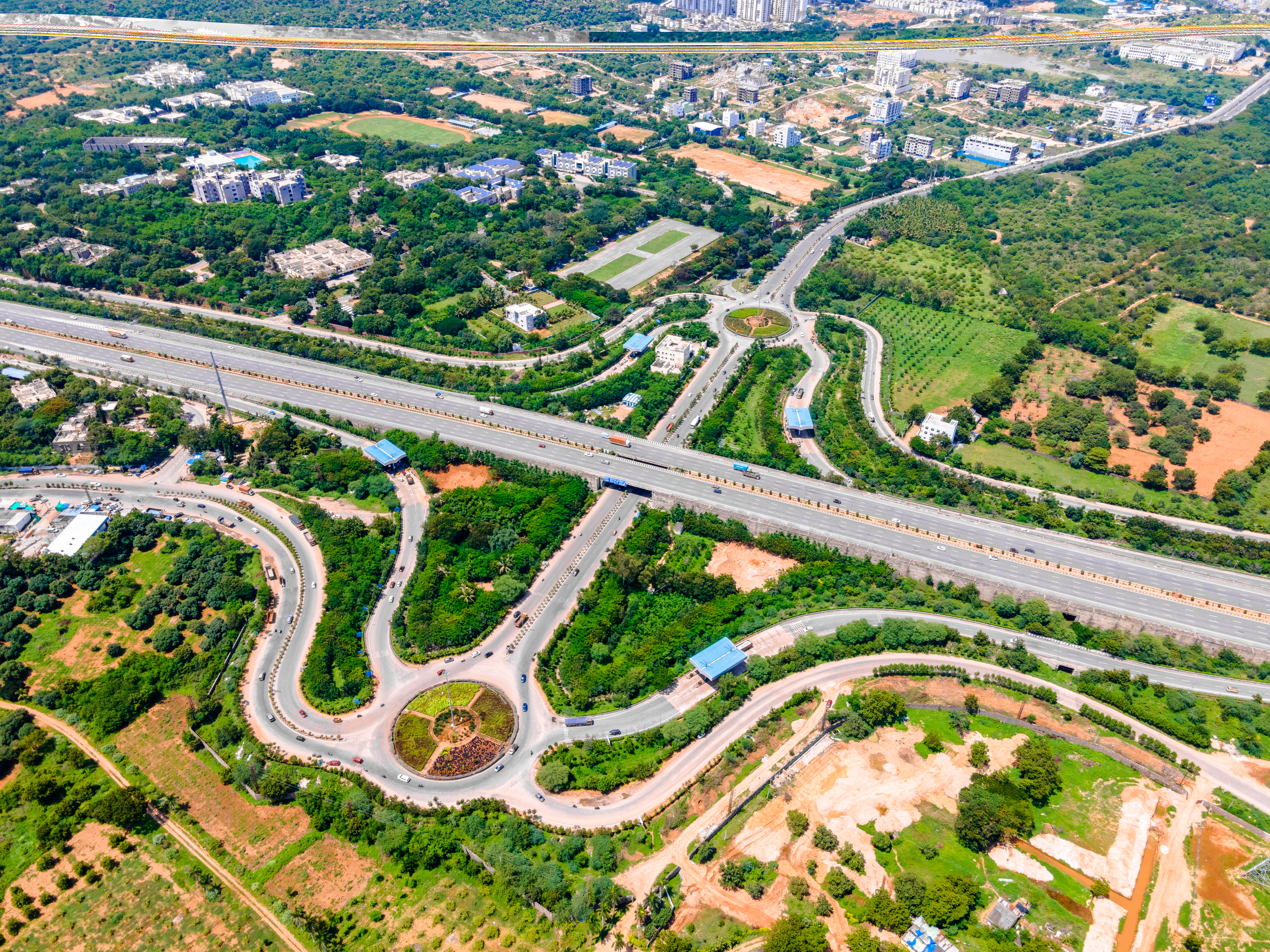

Route information
- Maintained by Greater Hyderabad Municipal Corporation, Hyderabad Metropolitan Development Authority
- Length: 158 km (98 mi)
- Existed: 2008; 18 years ago–present
- Restrictions: Two and three-wheeler vehicles are not allowed

Major junctions
- North end: Gachibowli
- South end: Narsingi

Location
- Country: India
- State: Telangana

Highway system
- Roads in India; Expressways; National; State; Asian; State Highways in Telangana

The Hyderabad Outer Ring Road (HORR), officially known as Nehru Outer Ring Road is a 158-kilometre (98 mi), eight-lane ring road expressway encircling Hyderabad, capital of the Indian state of Telangana. The expressway was designed for speeds up to 100 kilometres per hour (62 mph), later increased to 120 kilometres per hour (75 mph). A large part, 124 kilometres (77 mi) (covering urban nodes viz., HITEC City, Financial District, Rajiv Gandhi International Airport, Genome Valley, Hardware Park, Telangana State Police Academy, Singapore Financial District, and Games village) of the 158 kilometres (98 mi) was opened by December 2012.

It gives easy connectivity between NH 44, NH 65, NH 161, NH 765 and NH 163 from Hyderabad to Vijayawada and Warangal as well as state highways leading to Vikarabad Nagarjuna Sagar and Karimnagar/Mancherial. The Hyderabad Outer Ring Road also helps reduce the travel time from Rajiv Gandhi International Airport to cities like Nizamabad and Adilabad as it connects to NH44. The expressway is fenced and 33 radial roads connect it with the Inner Ring Road, and the upcoming Regional Ring Road.

== History ==
The Hyderabad Outer Ring Road (ORR) project was conceptualised in 2001 by the Andhra Pradesh government under CM N. Chandrababu Naidu. PM Manmohan Singh laid foundation stone in 2006 along with Union Minister of Urban Development Jaipal Reddy and Andhra Pradesh CM Y. S. Rajasekhara Reddy in 2006 and phased openings until 2018, connecting key airport/city nodes and transforming Hyderabad's growth, though it's also known for safety issues. Other ORRs exist (like in Bengaluru), and "ORR" can also refer to corporate entities like ORR Protection, but Hyderabad's is the most prominent in general discussions. Construction for the project commenced in 2006 and reaching completion in 2018. Originally, this project was taken up by HUDA (Hyderabad Urban Development Authority) through its internal funding without political intervention of state government. On 3 January 2006, Prime Minister Dr. Manmohan Singh laid the foundation stone for the proposed Outer Ring Road (Phase I) near Shamshabad on the outskirts of Hyderabad.

In December 2022, Government of Telangana planned to monetise the outer ring road through the toll-operate-transfer (TOT) model and generate revenues and called for tenders.

=== Opening timeline ===
- 14 Nov 2008: Gachibowli – Narsingi – Shamshabad (for Hyderabad International Airport) (22 km)
- 7 Jul 2010: Shamshabad – Pedda Amberpet (38 km)
- 14 Aug 2011: Narsingi – Patancheru (23.7 km)
- 3 Dec 2012: (part completed in 27 April 2018) Patancheru – Gowdavalli, and Kandlakoya – Shamirpet (38 km)
- 4 Mar 2015: Pedda Amberpet – Ghatkesar (14 km)
- 15 Jul 2016: Ghatkesar – Shameerpet (23 km)

=== Land acquisition ===
The First Phase land required was 750 acres (3.0 km^{2}), out of which the private land acquired was 500 acres (2.0 km^{2}). The land required for Second Phase is about 5,500 acres (22 km^{2}), of which the Govt. land is about 1,000 acres (4.0 km^{2}). The estimated Cost of Acquisition was ₹250 Crores.

=== Traffic studies ===
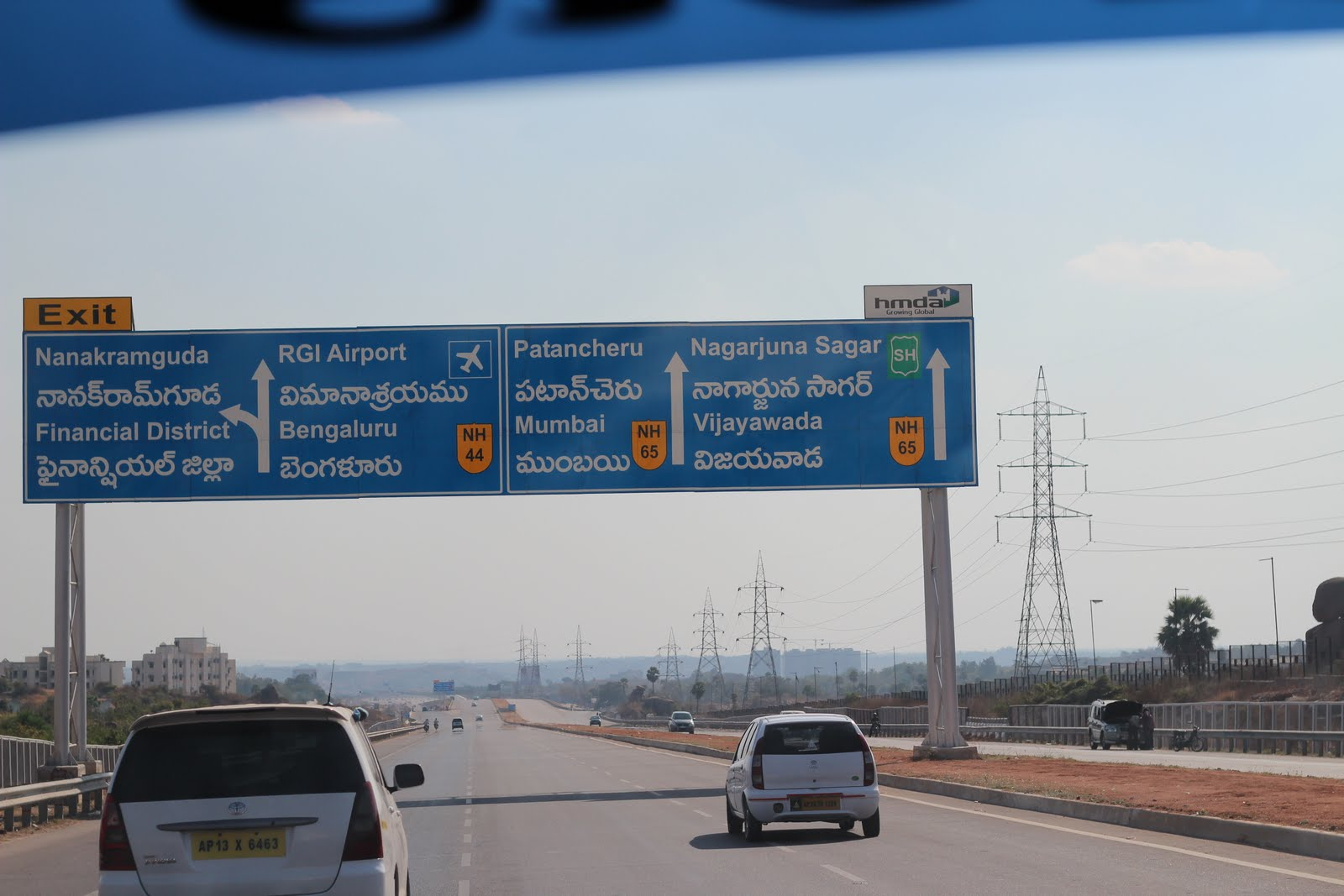
A glimpse of the ORR while heading from Gachibowli towards Shamshabad

The traffic studies on NH 44 and NH 65 concluded that a four- or six-lane road is due. The traffic movement on the existing inner ring road proved that the existing four-lane road was inadequate. Due to the anticipated growth in the region and the development of proposed satellite townships around the ring road and beyond, an eight-lane carriageway was planned with a design life of 20 years.

The conclusion was to develop a highway with access control provides highway grade separations or interchanges for all intersecting highways. Once it had been decided to develop the route as an expressway, all intersecting highways should be terminated, rerouted or provided with a grade separation. The proposed corridor was access-controlled and limited access was to be provided at National Highway/SHI Major road crossings. A two-lane service road designed to carry two-way traffic, was proposed on both sides of the corridor. Low level underpasses were to be provided for connecting both the service roads at every 1–2 kilometres (0.62–1.24 mi), where the terrain permits.

=== Criticism ===
Much before the outer ring road (ORR) became a ring road, it underwent several changes in the road alignments. Influential farmers and realtors changed the alignment to best serve their interests at the cost of small and marginal farmers.

The High Court of Andhra Pradesh passed a landmark judgement on 9 September 2010 in which the land acquisition proceedings were quashed for various reasons.

== Cycling track ==
Government of Telangana constructed a 23-kilometre-long (14 mi) cycle track on the Hyderabad Outer Ring Road (HORR) between the main carriageway and service road. The foundation stone was laid by the then Minister for Municipal Administration and Urban Development (MAUD) K. T. Rama Rao in September 2022. The cycle track is 8.5 kilometres (5.3 mi) long from Nanakramguda Junction to the Telangana State Police Academy (TSPA) and 14.50 kilometres (9.01 mi) from Narsingi to Kollur covered with solar panel rooftops along the stretch with a capacity of 16 MW. The width of the cycle track is 4.5 metres with one-metre green space on either side. The cycle track is the improved version of the South Korean model, which provides more facilities like lighting, protection from rain, parking and other amenities such as food stalls. A team of officials from HMDA and HGCL had visited South Korea and studied the Cycle Track Project between Daejon and Sejong.

== Proposed metro network ==
On 31 July 2023, K. T. Rama Rao mentioned that Government of Telangana has proposed a metro corridor of approximately 415 kilometres (258 mi) in length for city of Hyderabad and its peripheral areas, including 156 kilometres (97 mi) of metro network along the Outer Ring Road.

== Gallery ==
Hyderabad Outer Ring Road

Panorama from Kokapet junction

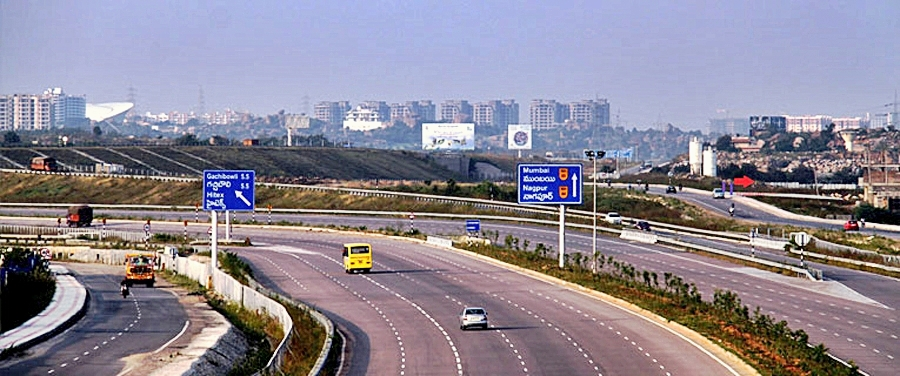
Shamshabad Airport towards Gachibowli

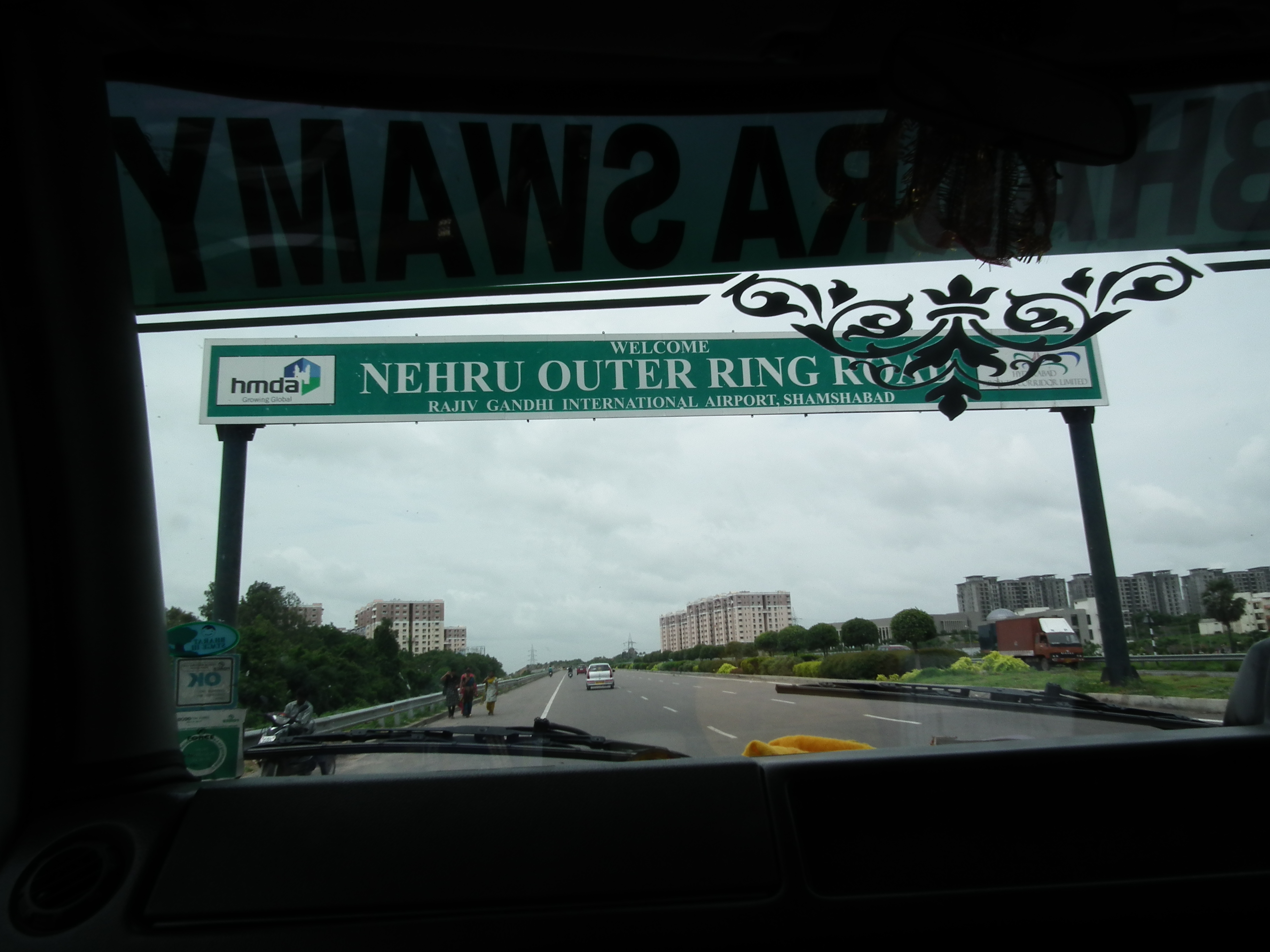
Welcome sign board

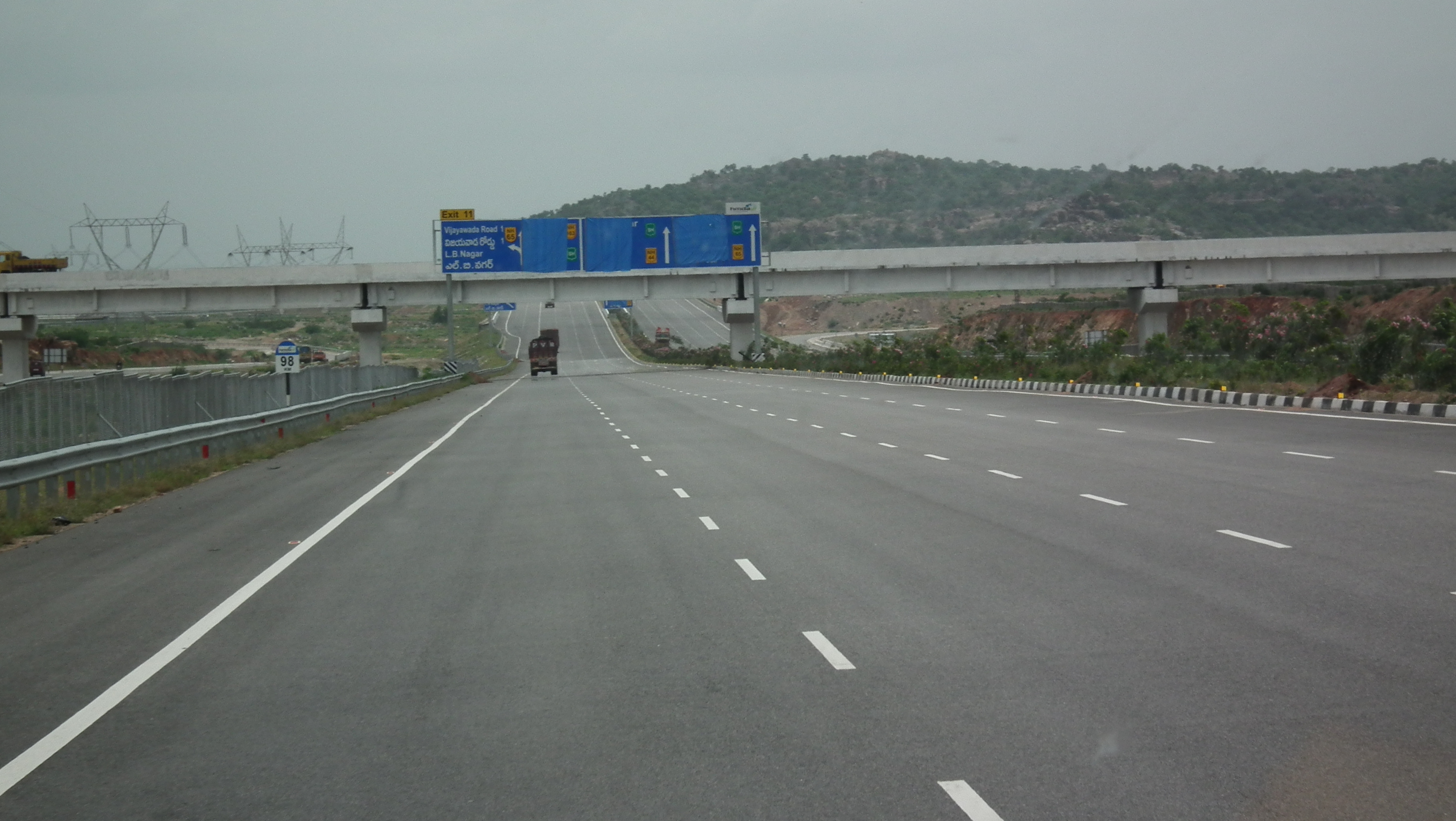
View from Nehru ORR

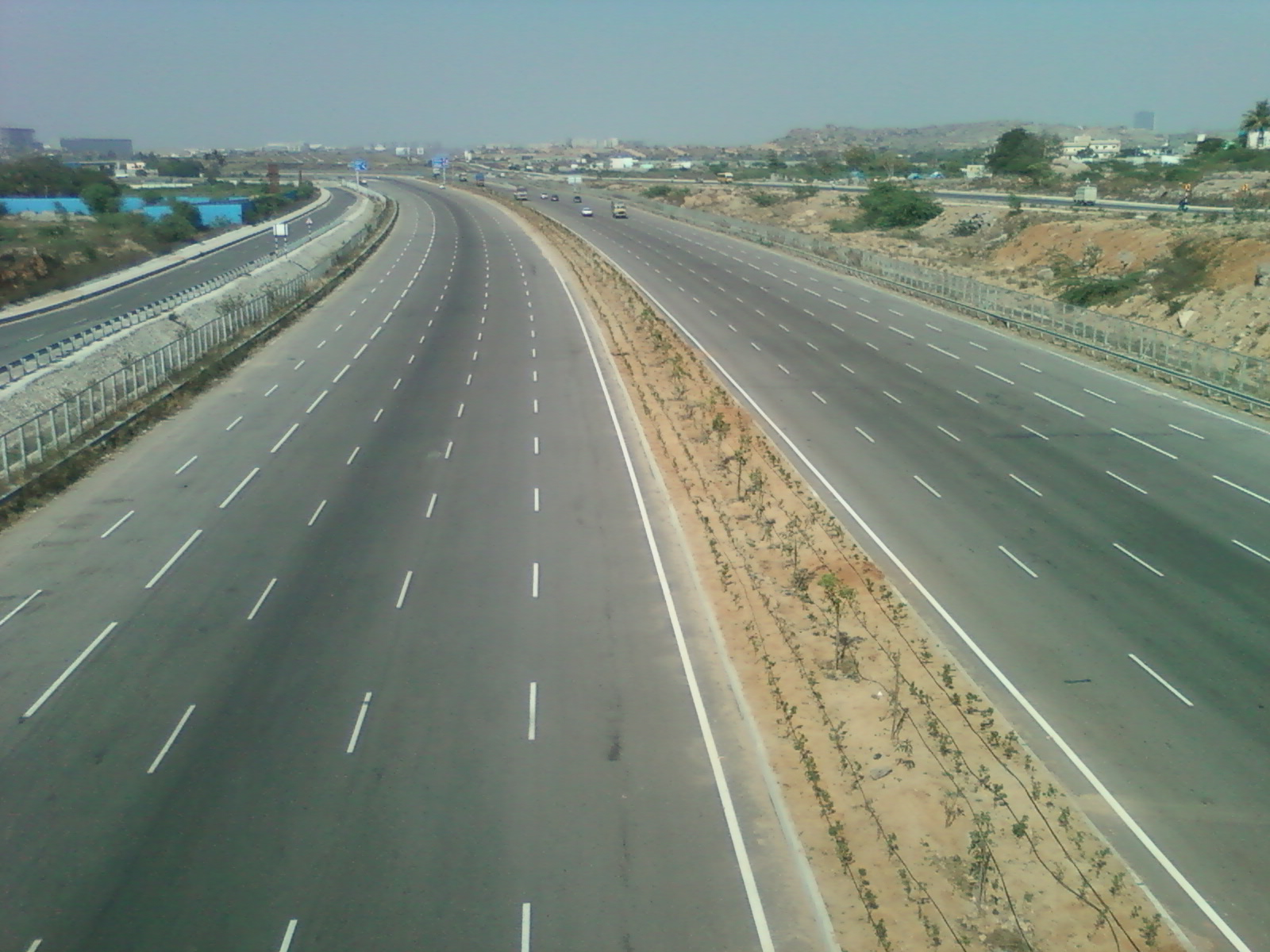
Outer Ring Road at Narsingi

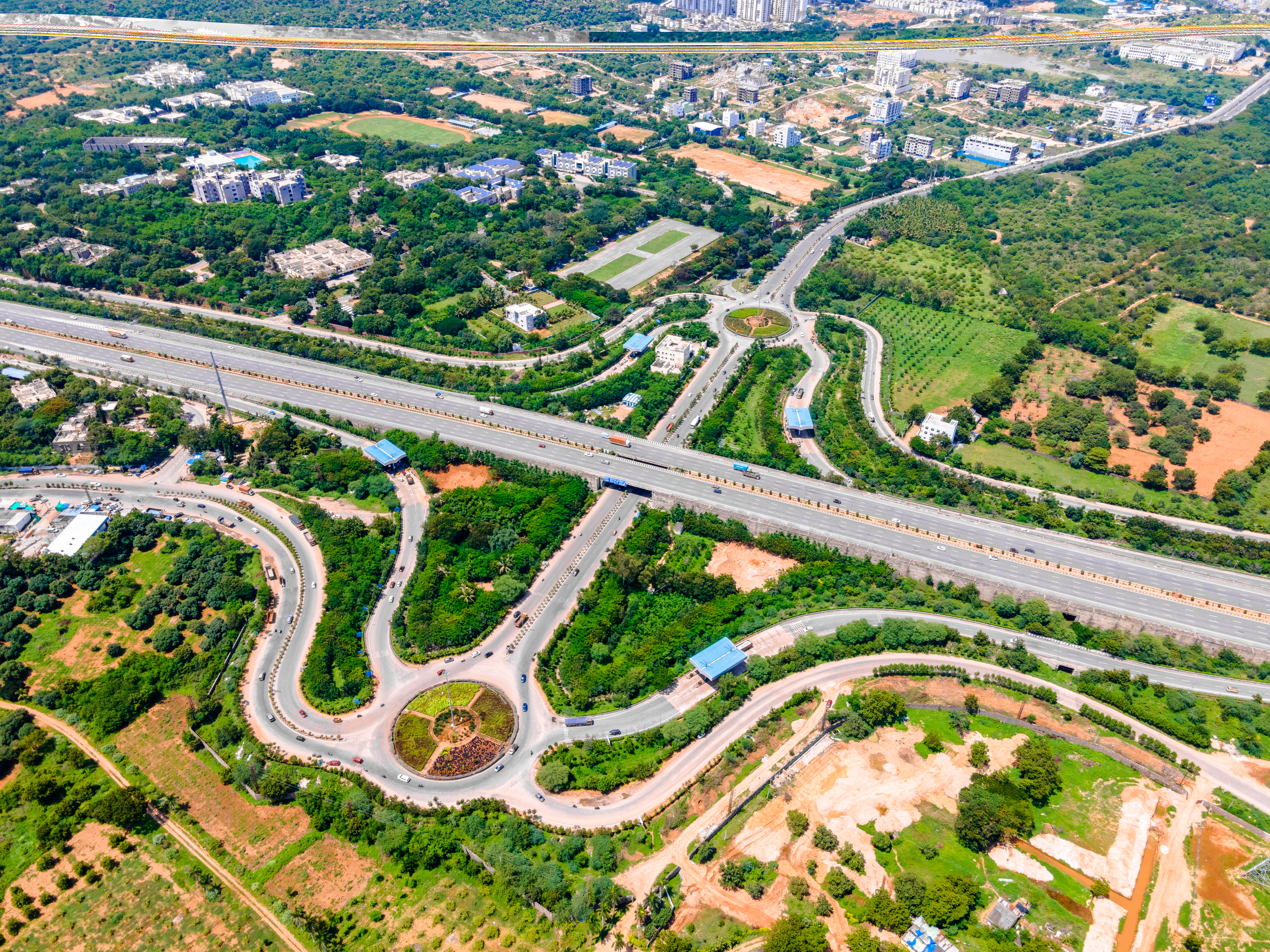
Aerial View of Nehru Outer Ring Road

== Exit and entry junctions ==
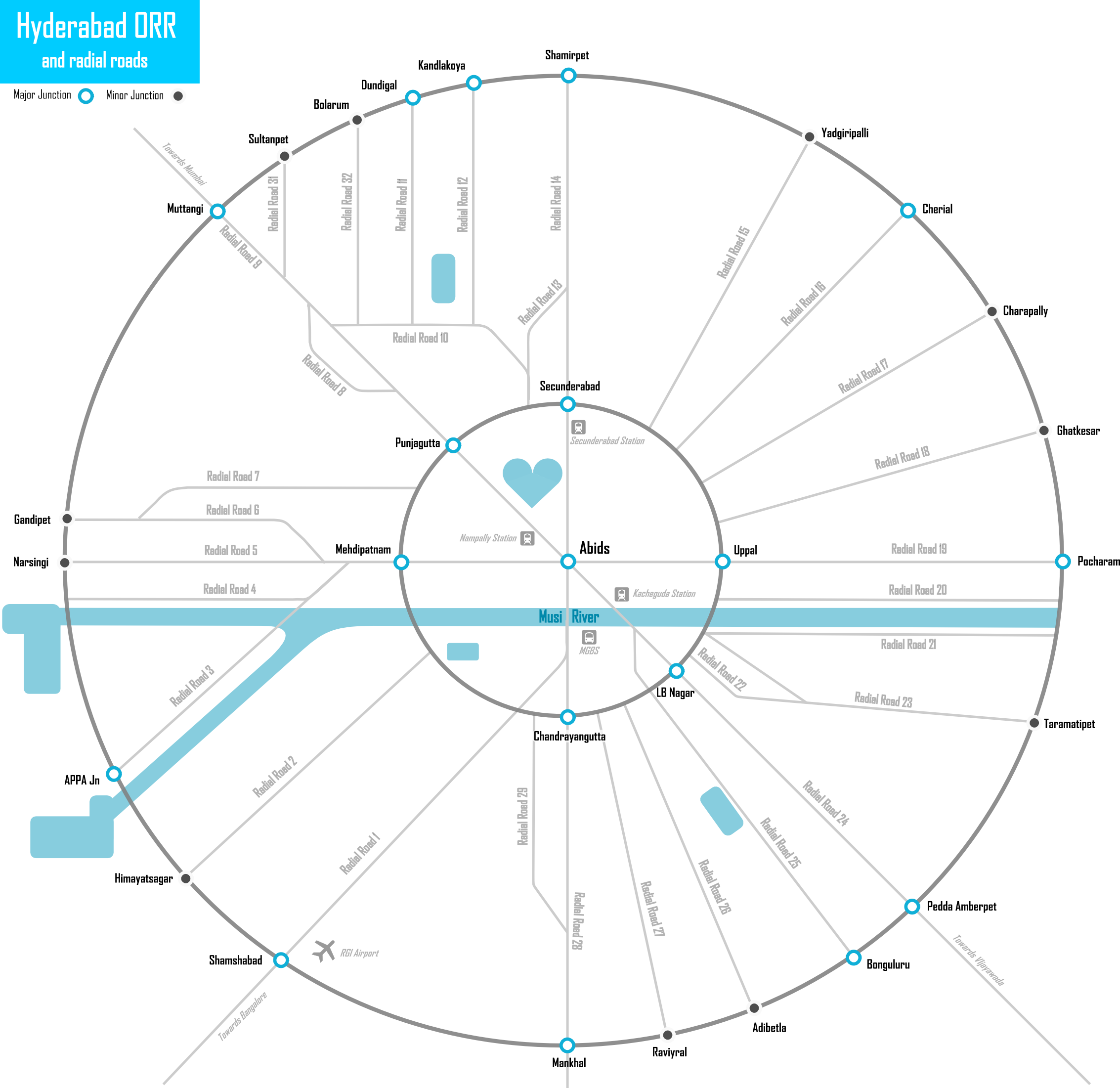
The Hyderabad Outer Ring Road

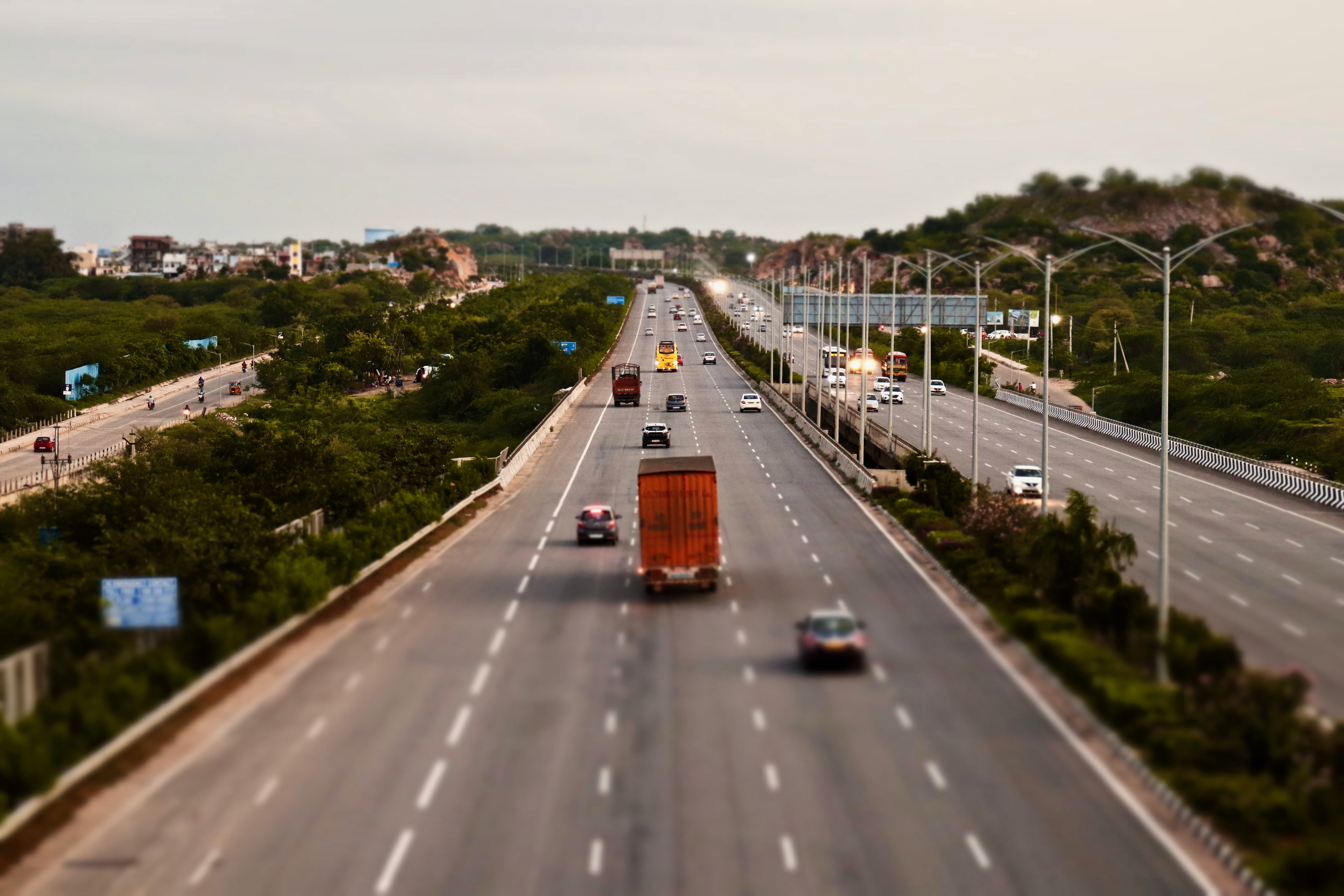
Ringroad towards RGIA

There are 20 interchange junctions on the Hyderabad Outer Ring Road.

- Kokapet interchange
- Shamshabad Junction
- Telangana State Police Academy Junction (TSPA Junction)
- Nanakramguda Junction
- Gachibowli Junction
- Muttangi Junction, Pantancheru
- Dommarapochampalli Junction
- Kandlakoya Junction, Medchal (NH44) Nagpur highway (Srinagar to Kanyakumari National Highway)
- Shamirpet Junction(SH1) Karimnagar State Highway
- Keesara Junction
- Annojiguda Junction, Ghatkesar
- Pedda Amberpet Junction
- Bongloor Junction

The HORR passes through the villages in Ranga Reddy and Sangareddy districts viz. Ghatkesar, Shamshabad, Tukkuguda, Kollur, Narsingi, Gachibowli, Patancheru, Bowrampet, Gowdavelli, Shamirpet, Pedda Amberpet, Bongloor and Medchal.

== See also ==
- Unified Metropolitan Transportation Authority, Hyderabad (India)
- Inner Ring Road, Hyderabad
- Regional Ring Road, Hyderabad
- Radial Roads, Hyderabad (India)
- Elevated Expressways in Hyderabad
- Intermediate Ring Road, Hyderabad (India)
- Outer Ring Road, Bangalore
- List of longest ring roads
