= Ramachandrapuram, Telangana =

Ramachandrapuram
- Neighbourood
- Nickname: R C Puram
- Location in Telangana, India Ramachandrapuram (Telangana) Ramachandrapuram (India)
- Coordinates: 17°31′1.023″N 78°18′0.225″E
- Country: India
- State: Telangana
- City: Hyderabad
- District: Sangareddy
- Mandal: Ramachandrapuram

Government
  - Type: Municipal Corporation
  - Body: Cyberabad Municipal Corporation

Area
  - Total: 10.88 km^{2} (4.20 sq mi)
- Elevation: 540 m (1,770 ft)

Population (2011)
  - Total: 91,712
  - Density: 8,429/km^{2} (21,830/sq mi)

Languages
  - Official: Telugu
- Time zone: UTC+5:30 (IST)
- Postal code: 502032
- Vehicle registration: TG 15
- Lok Sabha constituency: Medak Lok Sabha constituency
- MedakVidhan Sabha constituency: Patancheru Assembly constituency
- Website: telangana.gov.in

Ramachandrapuram, sometimes shortened to RC Puram, is a neighbourhood of Hyderabad, Telangana, India and also a part of Cyberabad Municipal Corporation and Hyderabad Metropolitan Development Authority .previously It was a part of Erstwhile Medak district , now a part of Sangareddy district. The local Ramachandrapuram TS Railway Station serves the region along the Patancheru - Chandanagar Road.

== Demographics ==
As of 2001 India census, Ramachandrapuram had a population of 52,586. Males constitute 52% of the population and females 48%. Ramachandrapuram has an average literacy rate of 70%, higher than the national average of 59.5%: male literacy is 75%, and female literacy is 64%. In Ramachandrapuram, 12% of the population is under 6 years of age. In Ashok Nagar Kakathiya Nagar literacy is almost 95%
