= Moinabad Municipality =

Civic body of Moinabad, India

Type
- Type: Municipal Council

History
- Founded: 2025

Leadership
- Chairperson: DUBBA SONIA DARSHAN
- Vice chairman: GARAGU RAJU
- Municipal commissioner: JAKEER AHMAD

Structure
- Seats: 25
- Political groups: Government (0): BJP (0); IND (0); Opposition (0): INC (0); BRS (0); Others (0)

Meeting place
- Municipal Office

Moinabad Municipality is the civic body that oversees the civic needs of the town of Moinabad in the Indian state of Telangana.

== History ==
This is a newly constituted as Municipality on 3 January 2025. It is formed duly merging (9) erstwhile villages i.e 1. Moinabad, 2. Aziz nagar, 3. Pedda Mangalaram, 4. Chilkuru, 5.Himayat nagar, 6. Surangal, 8. Murthuzaguda, and 9.appojiguda. The area of the ULB is 74.56 Sq.Kms. Population as per as per 2011 Census is 27,370 and presently it is estimated to 30,000 population. New Municipal Chairman/Chairperson of Moinabad Municipality is D. Soniya and Vice Chairman- G.Raju
