= Toopran =

Town in Telangana, India

- Town
- Location in Telangana, India Toopran (India)
- Country: India
- State: Telangana
- District: Medak
- Metropolitan area: Hyderabad Metropolitan Region

Government
  - Type: democracy
- Elevation: 536 m (1,759 ft)

Languages
  - Official: Telugu
- Time zone: UTC+5:30 (IST)
- Lok Sabha constituency: Medak (Lok Sabha constituency)
- Vidhan Sabha constituency: Gajwel (Assembly constituency)
- Website: Not available

Toopran is a revenue division in the Medak district of Telangana, India. Geographically located on the west and south banks of Haldi River. Haldi River also called by Pasupuleru, Haridranadi, kondavagu, Toorpurani etc. names. Toopran word is metamorphic change of Toorpurani.Toopran was under the jurisdiction of Medchal taluka in Nizams era - Harishankargoud Ramunigari.

== Geography ==
Toopran is located at 17.8447°N 78.4800°E.

== Schools ==
- Abhyasa International Residential School
- Akshara School
- Sri Chaitanya School
- Children's High School
- Geetha School

== Eminent persons ==
- Gummadi Vittal Rao popularly known as Gaddar was born here in 1949.
