= Nagilla, Ranga Reddy district =

Nagilla is a large village which is located in Madgul mandal of Ranga Reddy district, Telangana, India.

== Population ==
Particulars	Total	Male	Female
Population	4,786	2,464	2,332
Total no.of Houses	1,075	-	-
Child(0–6)	614	322	292
literacy	49.26%	58.96%	39.01%
Sex Ratio	942	1000	942
Child sex Ratio	907	1000	907
Schedule caste	936	486	450
Schedule Tribe	1,269	673	596
Total workers	2,197	1,186	1,011
