= Bommalaramaram =

Village in Yadadri Bhuvanagiri, India

Bommalaramaram Ramaram
- Mandal
- Location in Telangana, India Bommalaramaram (India)
- Coordinates: 17°33′45″N 78°44′25″E
- Country: India
- State: Telangana
- District: Bhuvanagiri
- Metropolitan Region: Hyderabad Metropolitan Region

Area
  - Total: 11.70 km^{2} (4.52 sq mi)

Population (2011)
  - Total: 3,080
  - Density: 263/km^{2} (682/sq mi)

Languages
  - Official: Telugu
- Time zone: UTC+5:30 (IST)
- Lok Sabha constituency: Bhongir
- Assembly constituency: Aleru

Bommalaramaram (or B. Ramaram) is a village in Yadadri Bhuvanagiri district of the Indian state of Telangana. It is located in Bommalaramaram mandal of Bhongir division, and is also a part of Hyderabad Metropolitan Region. The RRR (Regional Ring Road) goes through this area, Yadagirigutta New Bypass 4 Lanes road also passes here.
