= Shivampet =

Coordinates: 17°47′06″N 78°22′08″E

- Interactive map of Shivampet
- Country: India
- State: Telangana
- District: Medak

Languages
  - Official: Telugu
- Time zone: UTC+5:30 (IST)
- Vehicle registration: AP23
- Nearest city: Sangareddy, Medak
- Lok Sabha constituency: medak
- Vidhan Sabha constituency: Narsapuram (Lok Sabha constituency)
- Website: telangana.gov.in

Shivampet or Shivampeta is a Mandal in Sangareddy district of Telangana, India.
