= Balapur, Ranga Reddy district =

Balapur Hyderabad
- Town and Mandal
- Interactive map of Balapur Hyderabad
- Country: India
- State: Telangana
- District: Hyderabad District

Government
  - Body: GHMC

Languages
  - Official: Telugu
- Time zone: UTC+5:30 (IST)
- Vehicle registration: TG
- Lok Sabha constituency: Chevella
- Vidhan Sabha constituency: Maheshwaram
- Planning agency: Badangpet Nagara panchayat
- Civic agency: GHMC

Balapur is a suburb in Hyderabad district of the Indian state of Telangana. It is located in Balapur mandal of Kandukur revenue division. Balapur is one of the biggest refugee settlements in India, especially Rohingyas.

== Culture ==
The place is known for the auction of Laddu prasadam during Vinayaka Chavithi. The annual procession of Vinayaka Chaviti, starts from Balapur in old city.In balpur
