= Markook mandal =

Markook
- HMDA
- Interactive map of Markook
- Coordinates: 17.75266°N 78.72004°E
- State: Telangana
- District: Siddipet

Government
  - Type: Hyderabad Metropolitan Development Authority
- Elevation: 595 m (1,952 ft)

Languages
  - Official: Telugu
- Time zone: UTC+5:30 (IST)
- PIN: 502279
- Vehicle registration: TS 36
- Nearest city: Hyderabad
- Website: telangana.gov.in

Markook is a mandal in the outer suburbs of Hyderabad. It is a part of Hyderabad Metropolitan Development Authority, part of Siddipet District in Telangana State.

As part of the Kaleshwaram Lift Irrigation Project, the Konda Pochamma Sagar Reservoir was constructed nearby.

== Government ==
Assembly constituency: Gajwel

Assembly MLA: Kalvakuntla Chandrashekar Rao

Lok Sabha constituency: Medak

Parliament MP: Raghunandan Rao
