= Moinabad, Ranga Reddy district =

Moinabad
- Municipality
- Location in Telangana, India Moinabad (India)
- Coordinates: 17.3267°N 78.2752°E
- Country: India
- State: Telangana
- District: Ranga Reddy
- Mandal: Moinabad

Government
  - Type: Municipal Council
  - Body: Moinabad Municipality
- Elevation: 566 m (1,857 ft)

Languages
  - Official: Telugu
- Time zone: UTC+5:30 (IST)
- Vehicle registration: TG-07

Moinabad is a Town in Ranga Reddy district of the Indian state of Telangana. It falls under Moinabad mandal of Chevella revenue division.

== History ==
The name Moinabad originally came from a noble man of Hyderabad State member of the House of Paigah Nawab Moin-Ud-Dowlah Bahadur Asman Jah and the place was in complete control of the nobleman until the independence and mergence of Hyderabad state into India, Before the re-organization of districts, the village was under the jurisdiction of Chevella revenue division and in Ranga Reddy district.

== Geography ==
Moinabad is located at 17.3267°N 78.2752°E and at an altitude of 566 m (1,857 ft).

== Municipality ==
This is a newly constituted as Municipality on 03-01-2025. It is formed duly merging (8) erstwhile villages i.e 1. Moinabad, 2. Aziz nagar, 3. Pedda Mangalaram, 4. Chilkuru, 5.Himayat nagar, 6. Surangal, 7. Yenkepalli, and 8. Murthuzaguda. The area of the ULB is 74.56 Sq.Kms. Population as per as per 2011 Census is 27,370 and presently it is estimated to 30,000 population.

== Government and politics ==
Moinabad gram panchayat is the local self-government of the village. The panchayat is divided into wards and each ward is represented by an elected ward member. The ward members are headed by a Sarpanch.

Chevella (SC) (Assembly constituency) of Telangana Legislative Assembly. The present MLA representing the constituency is Kale Yadaiah of TRS.

== Transport ==
The Hyderabad–Kodangal is the new National highway with a length of 133 km (83 mi), passes through Moinabad.

== Education ==
The primary and secondary school education is imparted by the government schools such as Mandal Parishad, Mandal Parishad upper primary and Zilla Parishad High Schools.
