= Farooqnagar =

- Town
- Location in Telangana, India Farooqnagar (India)
- Coordinates: 17.0778°N 78.2011°E
- Country: India
- State: Telangana
- District: Ranga Reddy

Area
  - Total: 13.58 km^{2} (5.24 sq mi)

Population (2011)
  - Total: 45,675
  - Density: 3,363/km^{2} (8,711/sq mi)

Languages
  - Official: Telugu
- Time zone: UTC+5:30 (IST)
- PIN: 509216
- Vehicle registration: TG

Farooqnagar is a census town in Ranga Reddy district of the Indian state of Telangana.

== Demographics ==
As of 2011 census of India, it had population of 45,675.
