= Mulug, Siddipet district =

Mandal in Telangana, India

Mulug
- Country: India
- State: Telangana
- District: Siddipet

Languages
  - Official: Telugu
- Time zone: UTC+5:30 (IST)
- PIN: 502279
- Vehicle registration: TS 36
- Nearest city: HYDERABAD
- Website: telangana.gov.in

Mulug is a mandal in the Siddipet district of Telangana State, India.

The villages in Mulug mandal include, but are not limited to:

- Narsampally
- Achaipalle
- Aliabad
- Annasagar
- Bahilampur
- Banda Mailaram
- Baswapuram
- Chinnathimapur
- Damarakunta
- Dasarlapalle
- Gangadharapalle
- Karkapatla
- Kasireddypally
- Ksheerasagar
- Vagunoothi
- Vantimamidi
- Kamalabad
- Kokkonda
- Kolthur
- Kotiyal
- Lakshmakkapalle
- Mamidiyal
- Markook
- Mulug
- Nagireddypalle
- Narsapur
- Singannagudem
- Surampur
- Tunkibollaram
- Zapthisingaipalle
