= Yacharam =

yacharam
- Residential society
- Location in Telangana, India yacharam (India)
- Coordinates: 17.0449°N 78.6643°E
- Country: India
- State: Telangana
- District: Ranga Reddy
- Founder: 1890

Government
  - Type: Democratic
  - Body: Indian National Congress
- Elevation: 582 m (1,909 ft)

Population (2012)
  - Total: 5,000

Languages
  - Official: Telugu
- Time zone: UTC+5:30 (IST)

Yacharam is a village and mandal in Ranga Reddy district of the Indian state of Telangana. It is located in Yacharam mandal of Ibrahimpatnam revenue division. The Yacharam Police Station is a part of the law and order of the region.

== Geography ==
Yacharam is located at 17.0449°N 78.6643°E and at an altitude of 582 m (1,909 ft).
