= Ibrahimpatnam, Ranga Reddy district =

Ibrahimpatnam
- city
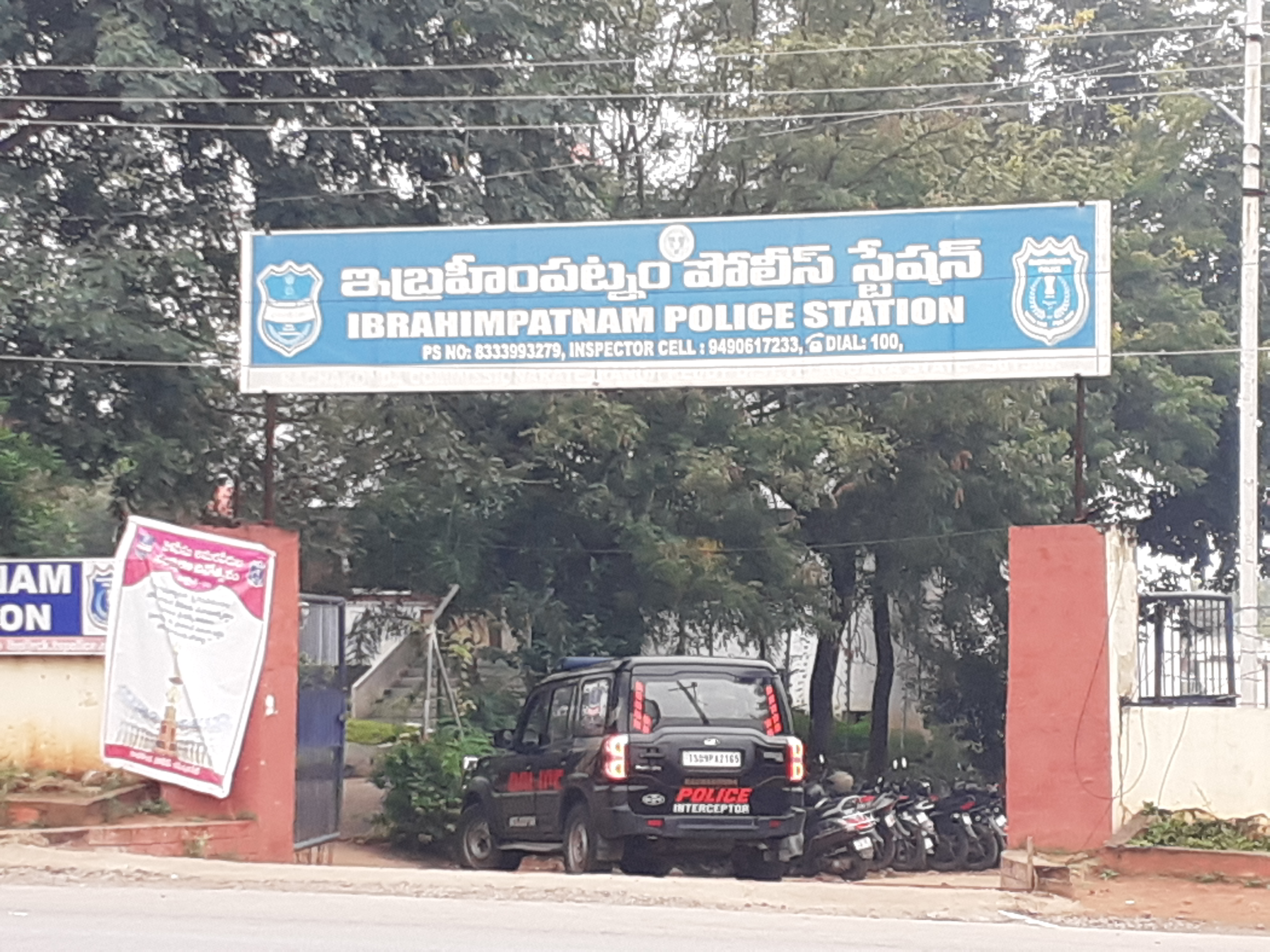
- Police station in Ibrahimpatnam

- Location in Telangana, India Ibrahimpatnam (India)
- Coordinates: 17°11′36.668″N 78°38′46.914″E
- Country: India
- State: Telangana
- District: Ranga Reddy
- Talukas: Ibrahimpatnam
- Elevation: 373 m (1,224 ft)

Languages
  - Official: Telugu , Urdu
- Time zone: UTC+5:30 (IST)
- PIN Code: 501506
- Area code: +91-08414
- Vehicle registration: TG-07

Ibrahimpatnam is a suburb of Hyderabad in Ranga Reddy district of the Indian state of Telangana. Offices of many IT companies are located around Ibrahimpatnam. It is located in Ibrahimpatnam mandal of Ibrahimpatnam revenue division.

The suburb is named after Ibrahim Qutb Shah who had built a lake known as Ibrahim Cheruvu. The settlement that grew around the lake came to be known as Ibrahimpatnam.

== Geography ==
Ibrahimpatnam is located at 16.5811°N 77.7489°E and at an altitude of 373 m (1,224 ft).

== Transport ==
Malakpet railway station is the nearest station to the town, located at a distance of 25 km. It is under the administration of Malakpet railway division of South Central Railway zone. TSRTC operates city buses from Ibrahimpatnam to various places.

== Politics ==
Malreddy Ranga Reddy is the current Member of Legislative Assembly from the area.
