= Madiga =

Caste in South India

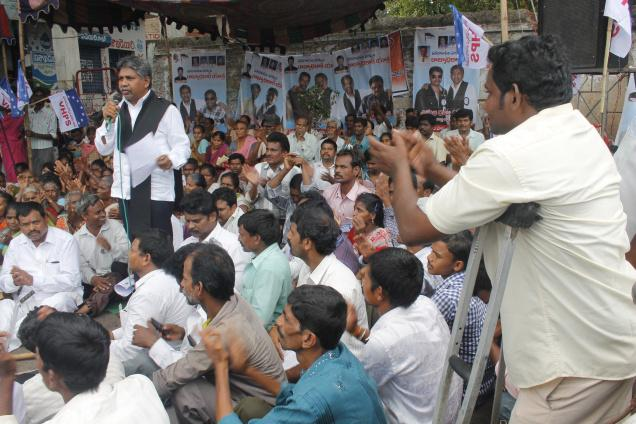
- Madiga community members at a Madiga Reservation Porata Samiti meeting
- Classification: Scheduled caste
- Religions: Hinduism, Christianity
- Languages: Telugu • Kannada • Tamil
- Country: India
- Populated states: Andhra Pradesh • Telangana • Karnataka • Tamilnadu • Maharastra
- Region: South India
- Population: 7.66 million

Madiga is a Telugu caste from southern India. They mainly live in the states of Andhra Pradesh, Telangana and Karnataka, with a small minority in Tamil Nadu. Madigas are historically associated with the work of tannery, leatherwork and small handicrafts. Today, most are agricultural labourers. They are categorized as a Scheduled Caste by the Government of India. Within the Madiga community, there are various sub-castes include Bindla, Chindu, Dakkali, Mashti, Sangaris and the priestly class is known as Madiga Dasu.

== Origin and mythology ==
Edgar Thurston and Siraj-ul-Hasan speculated Madiga derived from Mahadige or maha dige ra (transl. great man come down). This is related to the common origin story that the Madigas originated from Jambavanta, who helped the gods out of a difficulty.

== Distribution and occupation ==
=== Distribution ===
Madigas live mainly in Andhra Pradesh, Telangana, and Karnataka, with small minorities in neighboring states. As per the 2011 census, in United Andhra Pradesh Madigas constituted 48.27% of the total Scheduled Caste population with a population of 6,702,609. While Malas constituted 40.11%. Around 3.4 million Madigas live in Andhra Pradesh and another 3.3 million throughout Telangana.

In Karnataka, the Madigas make up 9.1% of the total Scheduled Caste population, totaling 953,913 individuals. In Old Mysore, the Madigas were one of the main Dalit communities, along with the Holeyas.

In Tamil Nadu, their population is recorded at 5,929, and in Maharashtra at 15,318.

In 2009, the term "Arunthathiyar" in Tamil Nadu was officially designated as an umbrella term encompassing various communities, including Arunthathiyar, Chakkiliyan, Madari, Madiga, Pagadai, Thoti and Adi Andhra with a combined population of 2,150,285.

Madiga Population Distribution (2011 census)
| State | Population | Percentage in State Population | Notes |
|---|---|---|---|
| Andhra Pradesh | 3,468,967 | 7.3% | |
| Telangana | 3,222,642 | 9.21% | |
| Karnataka | 953,913 | 1.56% | |
| Tamil Nadu | 5,929 | 0.008% | 2.97% (2,150,285 including sub-castes) |
| Maharashtra | 15,318 | 0.013 | |

=== Occupation ===
The occupation of the Madiga community is primarily associated with tanning leather, making footwear, belts, pouches, toddy-containers and bags which were provided to different castes as needed. Additionally, the Madiga community is known for their expertise in crafting the traditional drum called the Dappu. A significant portion of the Madiga population traditionally worked as cobblers. They specialized in crafting and repairing footwear. They are also village drummers who use Dandora or Dappu in festivals, death and marriage ceremony and announcements.

Some Madigas were traditionally engaged in various village services, including activities like horn-blowing, drum-beating, removal of animal carcasses, cleaning of public spaces and menial tasks. In exchange for their services, they received inam land. Those specifically involved in menial work were referred to as etti-Madiga. Their responsibilities included street cleaning, carrying government officials luggage, helping with revenue collection, maintaining peace as watchmen, household and farm chores for their landlord family. In the past, Madigas were obligated to provide free labor under the vetti system to landlords for a certain number of days during peak periods of agricultural labour. When payment was made, it was less than what was paid to the rest of the farmers. In some areas, landlords allocated land to Dalits, mainly Madigas, and provided initial resources. In return, tenants worked on the landlord's fields for nominal wages and received only 1/3 of the crop after harvest, maintaining their economic dependence.

The first social reform movements, driven by paternalistic upper-caste leaders, aimed to uplift the Madigas by encouraging them to adopt upper-caste customs and traditions. This involved forsaking practices such as alcohol consumption and rituals like the buffalo sacrifice. Despite the initial enthusiasm of the Madigas, they eventually abandoned these movements upon realizing that the upper castes continued to treat them with the same contempt as before. Subsequently, they turned to secular paths for upliftment, such as pursuing education and changing occupations, opportunities that were further opened up to them through the reservation system.

After the 1960s, significant changes occurred in Madiga livelihoods. The introduction of the Green Revolution led to more capital-intensive farming and mechanization, increasing the need for laborers. Additionally, industrially-produced goods began dominating rural markets, undermining the traditional occupations of Madiga leather artisans. This pushed many Madigas as agriculture laborers, increasing their dependence on landlords. The Green Revolution benefited the upper castes but left landless Madiga and Mala laborers facing continued exploitation.

== Politics ==
Early politics related to Dalits, including Madigas, in Andhra Pradesh was centered around welfare schemes for them, a form of politics most typical of Indian Congress. With the rise of the TDP (Telugu Desam Party), social polarization took on a political hue: with Dalits being considered "rebellious" if they did not support the TDP. In Telangana, Dalits and other backward communities formed the main base of the Left parties, who helped bring an end to the vetti system and other injustices committed by the landlords. However, in areas where the Left was not strong, the Dalits followed patronage systems and supported the Congress party, which was led by their Reddy landlords.

Initially, during the 1991 Indian general election, the DMS (Dalit Maha Sabha) was unable to turn the Dalit anger after Tsundur massacre into setting the political discourse. However, after the Bahujan Samaj Party - Samajwadi Party alliance came to power in the 1993 Uttar Pradesh Legislative Assembly election, the DMS thought they could create a similar victory in Andhra Pradesh. With the political aspirations of the Dalits and some other backward classes (like the Gollas) awakened, Kanshi Ram's 1994 tour of Andhra Pradesh garnered significant popularity and spurred the awakening of leaders not only within the Malas, Madigas, and other Dalit castes but also among marginalized leaders from the Backward Classes (BC). But when the media focused on the BSP in Andhra Pradesh, the Dalits felt that the local media was biased and only talked about problems within the BSP. This sudden rise of Dalit voices made the Congress and TDP change their election strategies. The Congress tried to get the votes of BSP supporters, and the TDP introduced popular programs. The TDP's efforts paid off, and they won big in the 1994 Andhra Pradesh Legislative Assembly election, while the BSP didn't do well. People believed that the Mahasabha, which had originally aimed for social change, moving into politics, was bad for the fight against caste discrimination in Andhra Pradesh. This led to the breakup of grassroots activists and their leaders.

=== Madiga Dandora movement ===
In 1994, Manda Krishna Madiga and Dandu Veeraiah Madiga formed the Madiga Reservation Porata Samiti (MRPS) to demand the categorization of the SC reservation quota to ensure equitable distribution of state allocations for all the constituent castes in Andhra Pradesh and Telangana, with implications extending beyond these states. This movement, more popularly known as the Madiga Dandora movement, held dharnas, mass rallies, rail rokos, and other activities to publicize for the demand of sub-classification within the Scheduled Caste category, with a focus on securing internal reservations for the Madiga community and other marginalized Dalit subgroups. This demand arose due to the growing disparities within the SC category, with some communities having more access to educational and employment opportunities than others. The MRPS has united not only the Madiga community but also other smaller marginalized groups, often referred to as "satellite castes," who face similar socio-economic challenges. The movement's bipartisan approach, engaging with various political parties to push for its demands, has drawn both support and criticism, with some accusing it of dividing the larger Dalit movement.

Their agitations led to a commission headed by justice Ramachandra Raju to examine the issue. In 1997, the commission published its report which found that reservation benefits had mainly gone to the Mala and Adi Andhra communities, and neither the Madiga or Relli had proportional representation in the quota. The commission recommended a four-fold classification of SCs for reservation benefit: 1% for group D (Rellis and related), 7% for group B (Madigas and related), 6% for group C (Malas and related) and 1% for Adi Andhra.

Earlier, TDP and Congress in the state made efforts to categorize SCs based on their level of backwardness, but these initiatives were met with legal challenges. In 2013, the movement gained significant momentum when Krishna Madiga, met Narendra Modi. During this meeting, Modi promised to amend the Constitution to implement internal reservations within the SC category. In a related development, the A.J. Sadashiva Commission, in its report submitted in 2012, has recommended internal reservation within the 15 per cent Dalit quota in Karnataka.

On November 11, 2023, Prime Minister Narendra Modi attended the Madigala Vishwaroopa Sabha, where Krishna Madiga appealed to him for a resolution to the 30-year-old peaceful struggle for social justice for the Madiga community within the Scheduled Castes (SCs). Following Krishna Madiga's address, Modi expressed that he didn't attend the meeting to make requests but to seek forgiveness on behalf of those who deceived the Madiga Community. Modi acknowledged Manda Krishna as his younger brother and announced that the Union government would establish a committee to evaluate the community's demands.

On August 1, 2024, Supreme Court of India, in a landmark decision, ruled that states are empowered to sub-classify Scheduled Castes (SCs) and Scheduled Tribes (STs) to provide quotas within the reserved category, aiming to uplift the more underprivileged castes. A seven-judge constitution bench, led by Chief Justice D.Y. Chandrachud, delivered this judgment with a 6:1 majority, stating that SCs and STs are not homogenous groups, and further sub-classification can ensure quotas for the most backward castes. Justice B R Gavai emphasized that states should identify and exclude the creamy layer from reservations. However, the court clarified that no caste in the SC category could be entirely deprived of quota benefits under this process. This ruling overrules the 2004 EV Chinnaiah vs. State of Andhra Pradesh case, which had previously barred such sub-classification.

== Religious conversion and caste identity ==
While the majority of Madigas adhere to traditional practices within their villages in Rayalaseema and Telangana, most of those residing in Coastal Andhra have embraced Protestant Christianity. Notably, the act of converting to Christianity was prevalent among Dalits in Coastal Andhra. Among them, the Madigas and Malas chose to affiliate with the Baptist and Lutheran denominations respectively, while still maintaining their caste identities. Most Madigas who adopted Christianity continue to identify as Hindu to secure their eligibility for Scheduled Caste reservations. This is due to the fact that Christians who disavow any caste affiliation are not eligible for these reservations. Consequently, Dalits who opt for Christianity risk losing their eligibility for the government's affirmative action program. This program, established in accordance with a 1950 presidential order, extends its benefits exclusively to those who identify as Hindu, Buddhist, or Sikh.

== In popular culture ==
- The activists Lelle Suresh and Sabrina Francis made a documentary on the condition and culture of the community, titled Mahadiga, which was released in 2004.
- 1940 Lo Oka Gramam film directed by Narasimha Nandi in 2010 portrays caste-based societal dynamics during the 1940s, offering a perceptive examination of the prevailing prejudices. The film's perspective serves as a representation of the era's social intricacies.
- Palasa 1978 film released in 2020 tells primarily about the caste discrimination in India and untouchability in the 1970s period.

== Notable people ==
=== Arts ===
- Darshanam Mogilaiah - Kinnera artist from Nagarkurnool district, Telangana

=== Film ===
- Kathi Mahesh - Film critic and actor from Chittoor district, Andhra Pradesh

=== Literature ===
- Gurram Jashuva - Telugu poet from Guntur, Andhra Pradesh

=== Politics ===
- A. Narayanaswamy - Minister of Social Justice and Empowerment, MP, Chitradurga
- N. Rachaiah - former MP, Chamarajanagar, Karnataka
- Bangaru Laxman - first Dalit national president of BJP, former M.P and Minister of State in the Ministry of Railways
- Chirumarthi Lingaiah - former MLA, Nakrekal, Telangana
- Damodar Raja Narasimha - MLA of Andole and former Deputy Chief Minister of United Andhra Pradesh
- Govind Karjol - former Deputy Chief Minister of Karnataka
- H. Anjaneya - former Minister of Social and Backward Classes Welfare, Karnataka
- K. H. Muniyappa - Cabinet Minister, former Minister of Micro, Small and Medium Enterprises, Karnataka
- K. Pushpaleela - former MLA, Ibrahimpatnam, Telangana
- Kolikapudi Srinivasa Rao - MLA of Tiruvuru, Andhra Pradesh
- Kothapalli Samuel Jawahar - former Minister of Excise, Kovvur, Andhra Pradesh
- L. Murugan - Minister of State in the Ministry of Fisheries, Animal Husbandry and Dairying from Tamil Nadu
- M.S. Raju - MLA of Madakasira, Andhra Pradesh
- Malyala Rajaiah - Former Minister of Finance, Power, and Housing and MP of Siddipet
- Nallagatla Swamy Das - former MLA, Tiruvuru, Andhra Pradesh
- Roopakala M Shashidhar - MLA of Kolar Gold Field, Karnataka
- R. S. Praveen Kumar - Politician and former IPS Officer, Telangana
- T. Rajaiah - former Deputy Chief Minister of Telangana, MLA of Station Ghanpur, Telangana
- Vangalapudi Anitha - MLA of Payakaraopeta, Andhra Pradesh
- Vemula Veeresham - MLA of Nakrekal, Telangana

=== Social Activists ===
- Manda Krishna Madiga - Indian politician and activist, founder of MRPS

== See also ==
- Karamchedu massacre
- List of Scheduled Castes in Andhra Pradesh & Telangana
- Chamar
- Ramdasia
- Jatav
- Chambhar
- Matanga
