= Damodar Raja Narasimha =

Indian politician

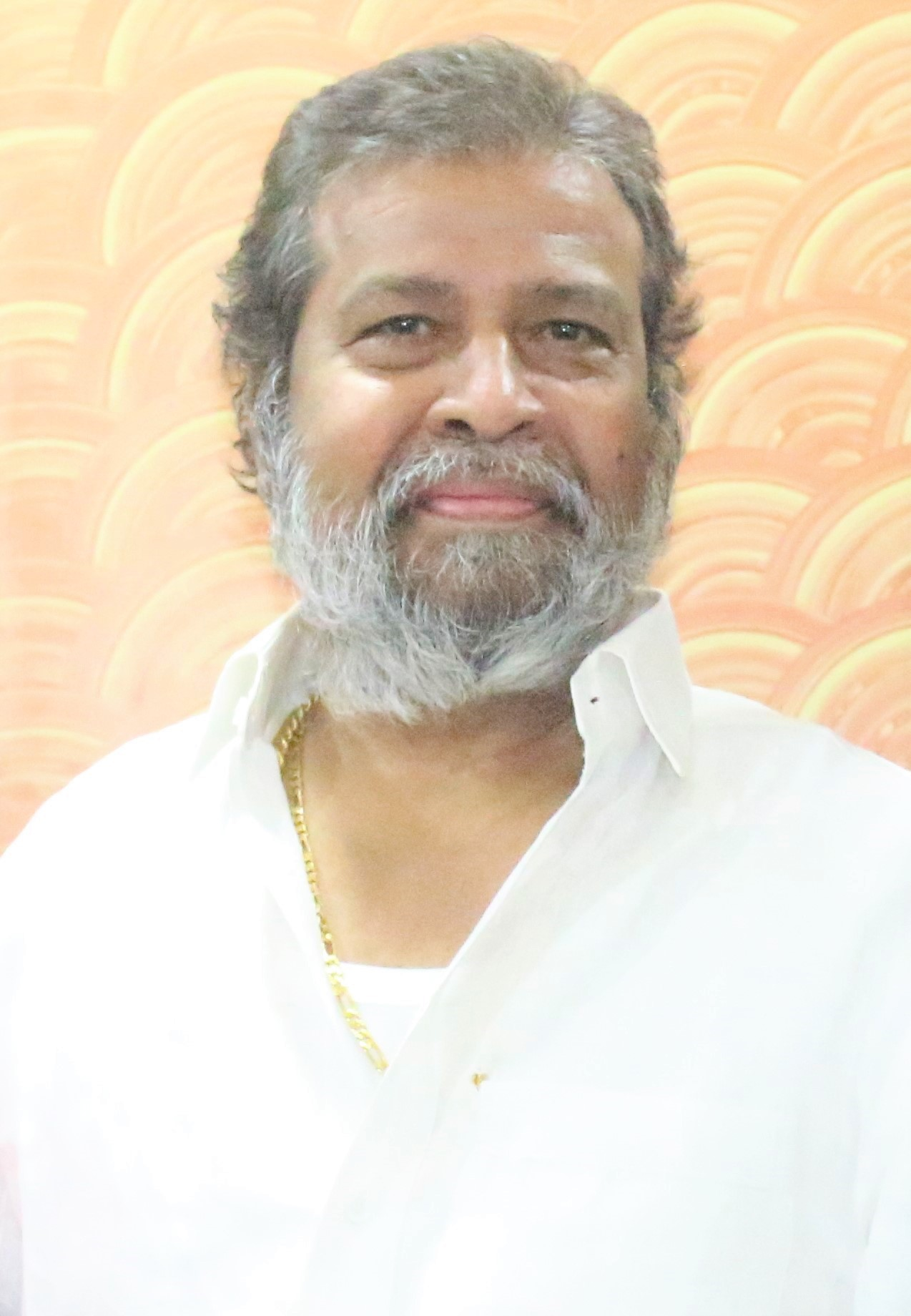

Minister of Health, Medical, Family Welfare, Science & Technology Government of Telangana
- Incumbent
- Assumed office 7 December 2023
- Governor: Tamilisai Soundararajan (2023-2024); C.P. Radhakrishnan (Additional charge) (2024); Jishnu Dev Varma (2024-2026); Shiv Pratap Shukla ( 2026–present)
- Chief Minister: Revanth Reddy
- Preceded by: T. Harish Rao (Health, Medical and Family Welfare); Allola Indrakaran Reddy (Science & Technology)

Member of Telangana Legislative Assembly
- Incumbent
- Assumed office 3 December 2023
- Preceded by: Chanti Kranthi Kiran
- Constituency: Andole

6th Deputy Chief Minister of Andhra Pradesh
- In office 10 June 2011 – 21 February 2014
- Governor: E. S. L. Narasimhan
- Chief Minister: Kiran Kumar Reddy
- Preceded by: Koneru Ranga Rao
- Succeeded by: (Nimmakayala Chinarajappa & K. E. Krishnamurthy as Deputy chief ministers Of Andhra) (Mahmood Ali &T. Rajaiah as Deputy chief minister of Telangana)
- Constituency: Andole

Member of Legislative Assembly Andhra Pradesh
- In office 11 May 2004 – 16 May 2014
- Preceded by: Pally Babu Mohan
- Succeeded by: Pally Babu Mohan
- Constituency: Andole
- In office 29 November 1989 – 11 December 1994
- Preceded by: Malyala Rajaiah
- Succeeded by: Malyala Rajaiah
- Constituency: Andole

Personal details
- Born: 5 December 1958 (age 67) Medak, Telangana, India
- Party: Indian National Congress
- Spouse: Padmini Reddy
- Children: 1

Cilarapu Damodar Raja Narasimha (born 5 December 1958) is an Indian politician and current Health and Medical Cabinet Minister of Telangana from December 2023. He served as the Deputy Chief Minister of Andhra Pradesh between 2011 and 2014. He represented Andole constituency as a Member of the Legislative Assembly (MLA) from the Indian National Congress, and held ministerial portfolios of Higher education and Agriculture (in charge).

== Early life ==
Cilarapu Damodar Raja Narasimha was born on 5 December 1958 in a Madiga (Dalit) family in Medak district to Congress politician Raja Narsimha and Janabai. His father served as an MLA representing Andole thrice.

Narasimha graduated from the tertiary institution as an engineer. Following the death of his father, Narasimha gave up his dream of becoming a bureaucrat and entered politics.

== Political career ==
Narasimha began his political career in 1989 when he was elected as an MLA from Andole (SC) constituency as a member of Indian National Congress. He lost subsequent elections until winning again in 2004 and later in 2009.

In 2004, Narasimha joined YS Rajasekhar Reddy's cabinet as a Minister for Primary Education. In 2009, he was appointed Minister for Marketing and Warehousing.

Narasimha became Deputy Chief Minister of Andhra Pradesh on 10 June 2011 and served until April 2014.

In 2023 Assembly Elections he contested from Andole and won with a majority of 27427 votes on BRS candidate Chanti Kranthi Kiran. He took oath as minister at L B Stadium in Hyderabad on 7 December 2023 and later he were assigned Health and Family Welfare, Science and Technology portfolios on 9 December 2023 in Revanth Reddy Ministry.

== Positions held ==
- Minister for Marketing and Warehousing 2009 - 2010
- Minister for Primary Education 2007 - 2009
- Chairman — SC Finance Corporation

== Personal life ==
Narasimha is married to Padmini. They have a daughter Trisha.
