= Chittem Rammohan Reddy =

Indian politician

Member of Legislative Assembly, Telangana
- In office 2014 – 3 December 2023
- Preceded by: K. Dayakar Reddy
- Succeeded by: Vakiti Srihari
- Constituency: Makthal

Member of Legislative Assembly Andhra Pradesh
- In office 2005–2009
- Preceded by: Chittem Narsi Reddy
- Succeeded by: K. Dayakar Reddy
- Constituency: Makthal

Personal details
- Born: 30 January 1963 (age 63) Dhanwada, Narayanpet district Telangana, India
- Party: Bharat Rashtra Samithi
- Other political affiliations: Indian National Congress
- Spouse: Sucharitha
- Parent(s): Chittem Narsi Reddy, Sumithra Reddy
- Occupation: Politician

Chittem Rammohan Reddy is an Indian politician from Telangana. He represented as MLA from Makthal constituency in the Telangana Legislative Assembly. He first won the seat in 2005 and retained it in the 2014 and 2018 Elections.
