= Revanth Reddy ministry =

Cabinet of Telangana, India, from 2023

- 3rd Ministry of Telangana
- Revanth Reddy
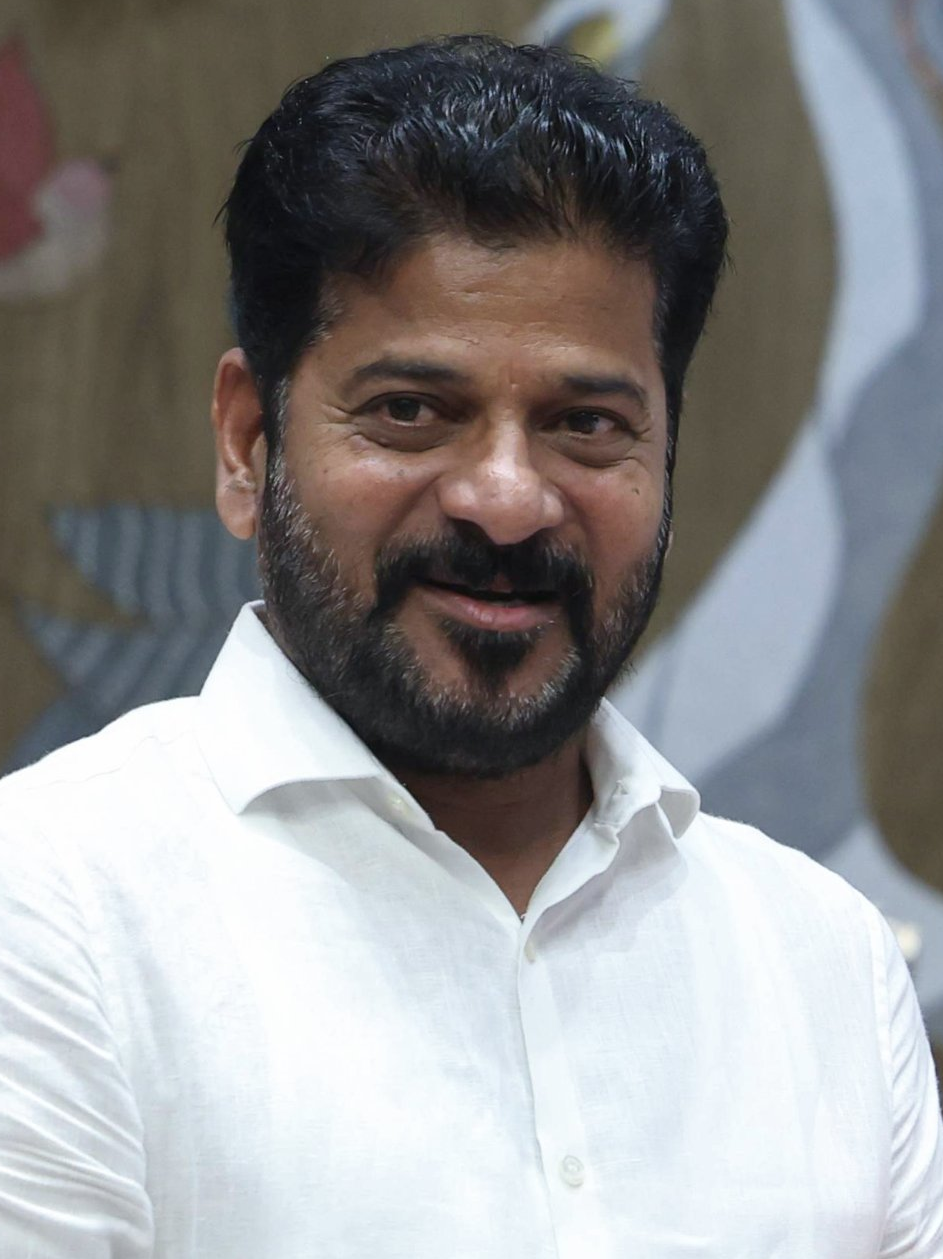
- Revanth Reddy
- Date formed: 7 December 2023 (2 years ago)

People and organisations
- Governor: Tamilisai Soundararajan (2023–19 March 2024); C. P. Radhakrishnan (additional charge) (20 March 2024 – 30 July 2024); Jishnu Dev Varma (31 July 2024–10 March 2026); Shiv Pratap Shukla (10 March 2026–present)
- Chief Minister: Revanth Reddy
- Deputy Chief Minister: Mallu Bhatti Vikramarka
- No. of ministers: 16
- Total no. of members: 16
- Member parties: Indian National Congress
- Status in legislature: Majority
- Opposition parties: All India Majlis-e-Ittehadul Muslimeen; Bharat Rashtra Samithi; Bharatiya Janata Party; (Legislative Assembly)
- Opposition leader: S. Madhusudhana Chary (Council); K. Chandrashekar Rao (Assembly)

History
- Election: 2023
- Outgoing election: 2023
- Legislature term: 5 years
- Predecessor: Second K. Chandrashekar Rao ministry

The Revanth Reddy ministry represents the third cabinet of the Indian state of Telangana under the leadership of Revanth Reddy, who has been elected as the second Chief Minister of Telangana. The Indian National Congress (INC), led by Revanth Reddy, secured an absolute majority in the 2023 Telangana Legislative Assembly election, winning 64 out of the 119 seats in the state assembly.

Reddy assumed the office of Chief Minister of Telangana in a swearing-in ceremony held at L. B. Stadium, Hyderabad on 7 December 2023. The oath of office and secrecy was administered to him and his eleven member cabinet by Governor Tamilisai Soundararajan.

== Council of Ministers ==
Portfolio	Minister	Constituency	Tenure		Party
Portfolio	Minister	Constituency	Took office	Left office	Party
Chief Minister
Municipal Administration and Urban Development; General Administration; Education; Law & Order; Other departments not allocated to any Minister	Anumula Revanth Reddy	Kodangal	7 December 2023	Incumbent	INC
Deputy Chief Minister
Finance & Planning; Energy	Mallu Bhatti Vikramarka	Madhira (SC)	7 December 2023	Incumbent	INC
Cabinet Ministers
Irrigation & Command Area Development; Food and Civil Supplies	Nalamada Uttam Kumar Reddy	Huzurnagar	7 December 2023	Incumbent	INC
Transport; Backward Classes Welfare	Ponnam Prabhakar	Husnabad	7 December 2023	Incumbent	INC
Roads and Buildings; Cinematography	Komatireddy Venkat Reddy	Nalgonda	7 December 2023	Incumbent	INC
Environment & Forests; Endowment	Konda Surekha	Warangal East	7 December 2023	3 September 2026	INC
Panchayat Raj and Rural Development; Women and Child Development	Dansari Anasuya Seethakka	Mulug (ST)	7 December 2023	Incumbent	INC
Information Technology, Electronics and Communications; Industries and Commerce; Legislative Affairs	Duddilla Sridhar Babu	Manthani	7 December 2023	Incumbent	INC
Revenue; Housing; Information and Public Relations.	Ponguleti Srinivasa Reddy	Palair	7 December 2023	Incumbent	INC
Agriculture and Co-operation; Marketing; Handlooms & Textiles	Thummala Nageswara Rao	Khammam	7 December 2023	Incumbent	INC
Health, Medical and Family Welfare; Science and Technology	Cilarapu Damodar Raja Narasimha	Andole (SC)	7 December 2023	Incumbent	INC
Prohibition & Excise; Tourism & Culture; Archaeology	Jupally Krishna Rao	Kollapur	7 December 2023	Incumbent	INC
Labour, Employment, Training & Factories; Mines & Geology	Gaddam Vivekanand	Chennur (SC)	8 June 2025	Incumbent	INC
Scheduled Castes Development; Tribal Welfare; Empowerment of Persons with Disabilities, Senior Citizens, and Transgender Persons	Adluri Laxman Kumar	Dharmapuri (SC)	8 June 2025	Incumbent	INC
Animal Husbandry, Dairy Development & Fisheries; Sports & Youth Services	Vakiti Srihari	Makthal	8 June 2025	Incumbent	INC
Public Enterprises; Minorities Welfare	Mohammad Azharuddin	MLC	31 October 2025	Incumbent	INC

== By Departments ==
An alphabetical list of all the departments of Telangana Government

Portfolio	Minister	Took office	Left office	Party
Agriculture and Co-operation	Thummala Nageswara Rao	7 December 2023	Incumbent	INC
Animal Husbandry, Dairy Development and Fisheries	Revanth Reddy (Chief Minister)	7 December 2023	8 June 2025	INC
Animal Husbandry, Dairy Development and Fisheries	Vakiti Srihari	8 June 2025	Incumbent	INC
Backward Classes Welfare	Ponnam Prabhakar	7 December 2023	Incumbent	INC
Home (Cinematography)	Komatireddy Venkat Reddy	7 December 2023	Incumbent	INC
Consumer Affairs Food & Civil Supplies	Nalamada Uttam Kumar Reddy	7 December 2023	Incumbent	INC
Revenue (Endowments)	Konda Surekha	7 December 2023	Incumbent	INC
Energy	Mallu Bhatti Vikramarka (Deputy Chief Minister)	7 December 2023	Incumbent	INC
EFS&T (Environment & Forests)	Konda Surekha	7 December 2023	Incumbent	INC
Finance	Mallu Bhatti Vikramarka (Deputy Chief Minister)	7 December 2023	Incumbent	INC
General Administration (Political)	Revanth Reddy (Chief Minister)	7 December 2023	Incumbent	INC
Industries and Commerce (Handlooms & Textiles)	Thummala Nageswara Rao	7 December 2023	Incumbent	INC
Health, Medical & Family Welfare, EFS&T (Science and Technology)	Cilarapu Damodar Raja Narasimha	7 December 2023	Incumbent	INC
Higher Education	Revanth Reddy (Chief Minister)	7 December 2023	Incumbent	INC
Home	Revanth Reddy (Chief Minister)	7 December 2023	Incumbent	INC
Housing	Ponguleti Srinivasa Reddy	7 December 2023	Incumbent	INC
Industries and Commerce	Duddilla Sridhar Babu	7 December 2023	Incumbent	INC
GAD (Information and Public Relations)	Ponguleti Srinivasa Reddy	7 December 2023	Incumbent	INC
Information Technology, Electronics and Communications	Duddilla Sridhar Babu	7 December 2023	Incumbent	INC
Irrigation and CAD	Nalamada Uttam Kumar Reddy	7 December 2023	Incumbent	INC
Labour, Employment Training and Factories	Revanth Reddy (Chief Minister)	7 December 2023	8 June 2025	INC
Labour, Employment Training and Factories	G. Vivekanand	8 June 2025	Incumbent	INC
Law & Order	Revanth Reddy (Chief Minister)	7 December 2023	Incumbent	INC
Legislative Affairs	Duddilla Sridhar Babu	7 December 2023	Incumbent	INC
Minorities Welfare	Revanth Reddy (Chief Minister)	7 December 2023	8 June 2025	INC
Minorities Welfare	Adluri Laxman Kumar	8 June 2025	31 October 2025	INC
Minorities Welfare	Mohammad Azharuddin	31 October 2025	Incumbent	INC
Municipal Administration & Urban Development	Revanth Reddy (Chief Minister)	7 December 2023	Incumbent	INC
Panchayat Raj and Rural Development	Dansari Anasuya Seethakka	7 December 2023	Incumbent	INC
Planning	Mallu Bhatti Vikramarka (Deputy Chief Minister)	7 December 2023	Incumbent	INC
Public Enterprises	Revanth Reddy (Chief Minister)	7 December 2023	31 October 2025	INC
Public Enterprises	Mohammad Azharuddin	31 October 2025	Incumbent	INC
Revenue (Registration and Stamps)	Ponguleti Srinivasa Reddy	7 December 2023	Incumbent	INC
Revenue (Prohibition & Excise)	Jupally Krishna Rao	7 December 2023	Incumbent	INC
Revenue (Commercial Taxes)	Revanth Reddy (Chief Minister)	7 December 2023	Incumbent	INC
Transport, Roads and Buildings (Roads and Buildings)	Komatireddy Venkat Reddy	7 December 2023	Incumbent	INC
School Education (SE Wing)	Revanth Reddy (Chief Minister)	7 December 2023	Incumbent	INC
Scheduled Castes Development	Revanth Reddy (Chief Minister)	7 December 2023	8 June 2025	INC
Scheduled Castes Development	Adluri Laxman Kumar	8 June 2025	Incumbent	INC
YAT&C (Sports and Youth Services)	Revanth Reddy (Chief Minister)	7 December 2023	8 June 2025	INC
YAT&C (Sports and Youth Services)	Vakiti Srihari	8 June 2025	Incumbent	INC
Transport, Roads and Buildings (Transport)	Ponnam Prabhakar	7 December 2023	Incumbent	INC
Tribal Welfare	Revanth Reddy (Chief Minister)	7 December 2023	8 June 2025	INC
Tribal Welfare	Adluri Laxman Kumar	8 June 2025	Incumbent	INC
Women and Child Welfare	Dansari Anasuya Seethakka	7 December 2023	Incumbent	INC
YAT&C (Tourism and Culture)	Jupally Krishna Rao	7 December 2023	Incumbent	INC
YAT&C (Archaeology)	Jupally Krishna Rao	7 December 2023	Incumbent	INC

== Major decisions ==
On the day of Reddy's swearing-in, the iron barricades at the entrance to the chief minister's office were removed. Reddy announced his availability at the office to listen to people's grievances daily from 8 December 2023, reflecting the promise of people's government.

Another promise was fulfilled on 9 December 2023, when free bus rides for women were announced by the Telangana Government.

The Telangana state government has donated Rs 3 crore to the Tablighi Jamaat and the Telangana State High Court has issued a notice for doing so.

== Demographics ==
Representation of Ministers by district
1. Khammam (25.0%)
2. Medak (8.33%)
3. Mulugu (8.33%)
4. Nagarkurnool (8.33%)
5. Nalgonda (8.33%)
6. Peddapalli (8.33%)
7. Siddipet (8.33%)
8. Suryapet (8.33%)
9. Vikarabad (8.33%)
10. Warangal (8.33%)

Ministers by district (Note: Based on the location of the assembly constituency from which the corresponding member was elected from.)
#	District	Ministers	Name
1	Adilabad	0	
2	Bhadradri Kothagudem	0	
3	Hanamkonda	1	Konda Surekha (Former)
4	Hyderabad	0	
5	Jagtial	1	Adluri Laxman Kumar
6	Jangaon	0	
7	Jayashankar Bhupalpalle	0	
8	Jogulamba Gadwal	0	
9	Komaram Bheem Asifabad district	0	
10	Kamareddy	0	
11	Karimnagar	0	
12	Khammam	3	Mallu Bhatti Vikramarka (Deputy Chief Minister); Ponguleti Srinivasa Reddy; Thummala Nageswara Rao
13	Mahabubabad	0	
14	Mahabubnagar	0	
15	Mancherial	1	Gaddam Vivekanand
16	Medak	0	
17	Medchal-Malkajgiri	0	
18	Mulugu	1	Dansari Anasuya Seethakka
19	Nagarkurnool	1	Jupally Krishna Rao
20	Nalgonda	1	Komatireddy Venkat Reddy
21	Narayanpet	1	Vakiti Srihari
22	Nirmal	0	
23	Nizamabad	0	
24	Peddapalli	1	Duddilla Sridhar Babu
25	Rajanna Sircilla	0	
26	Ranga Reddy	0	
27	Sangareddy	1	Cilarapu Damodar Raja Narasimha
28	Siddipet	1	Ponnam Prabhakar
29	Suryapet	1	Nalamada Uttam Kumar Reddy
30	Vikarabad	1	Anumula Revanth Reddy (Chief Minister)
31	Wanaparthy	0	
32	Warangal	0	
33	Yadadri Bhuvanagiri	0	
34	MLC (Non-district)	1	Mohammad Azharuddin
