= Regode =

- Village
- Location in Telangana, India Regode (India)
- Coordinates: 17.9833°N 77.8333°E
- Country: India
- State: Telangana
- District: Medak
- Elevation: 506 m (1,660 ft)

Population (2001)
  - Total: 3,267

Languages
  - Official: Telugu
- Time zone: UTC+5:30 (IST)
- PIN: 502290
- Vehicle registration: TS-23
- Vidhan Sabha constituency: Andole
- Website: telangana.gov.in

Regode is a village and Mandal in Medak district of Telangana, India.

Regode mandal is bounded by Manoor, Narayankhed, Shankarampet, Alladurg, Andole, Pulkal, Munpalle and Raikode mandals.

== Geography ==
Regode is located at 17.9833°N 77.8333°E. It has an average elevation of 506 metres (1663 ft).

== Demographics ==
According to the 2001 Indian census, the total population was 33,056 in 5,980 households. The male population was 16,780 and females totalled 16,276. Children under 6 years of age were 5,484 (boys 2,779 and girls 2,705), and total literates were 10,269.

Regode village has a population of 3,267 in 2001.

== Villages ==
The villages in Regode mandal include Chowderpalle, Devnoor, Dosapalle, Dudiyal, Gajwada, Jagriyal, Khaderabad, Kondapur, Kothwalpalle, Marpalle, Medikonda, Nirjipala, Pyararam, Pocharam, R. Itikyal, Regode, Saipet, Sindole, Timmapoor, Tatipally, T. Lingampalle, M. Venkatapoor, Usrikpalle, Darakastupally, PeddaThanda, and Bhoothkoor.
