= Ayesha Miran rape case =

Ayesha Meera rape case of united Andhra Pradesh

Ayesha Miran rape and murder case
- Location: Vijayawada, Andhra Pradesh, India
- Date: 27 December 2007
- Attack type: Rape, Femicide, Stabbing attack, Murder
- Deaths: 1
- Victim: Ayesha Miran
- Perpetrators: Initially accused: P. Satyam Babu * Allegedly implicated: Koneru Satish (grandson of former deputy CM Koneru Ranga Rao) and others (under investigation by CBI)
- Verdict: Initially convicted, later acquitted by Hyderabad High Court (2017); ordered fresh investigation by CBI (2018)
- Convictions: Initial judgment: Murder and Rape (later overturned); Court ordered CBI investigation in 2018; Initial sentence: 14 years for murder and 10 years for rape (concurrent); Hyderabad High Court acquitted accused and awarded ₹1 lakh compensation for wrongful imprisonment

Ayesha Miran (sometimes written as Ayesha Meeran or Ayesha Meera) was a 17.5 year old girl who was raped and murdered in Vijayawada, India.

== The incident ==
A 17.5-year-old pharmacy student named Ayesha Meera was raped and murdered brutally in a hostel in Vijayawada. Her body with stab injuries was found in the bathroom on 27 December 2007. A letter dropped by the 'murderer' stated that the girl was raped and murdered for refusing his request for 'love'.

== Skepticism of police claims ==
Relatives of P. Satyam Babu and Human Rights activists alleged that the police was trying to eliminate him in an effort to shield the real culprits in the case. They pointed out that Babu is unable walk as he suffered from a neurological disorder. He has GB Syndrome and as a result had badly affected his nervous system and his two legs are paralysed. The doctors at Nizam's Institute of Medical Sciences (NIMS) confirmed that he could hardly walk. Even the victim's parents also rejected the police claim that Babu murdered her and alleged that police were trying to save some politically influential people.

Several activists had alleged that the police arrested Satyam Babu only as they could let Koneru Satish, the grandson of former deputy CM Koneru Ranga Rao off the case. Ayesha's parents also alleged that Koneru Satish and his friends were a regular visitors to the girls hostel as it was owned by his relative, Konera Padma.

== Arrest, escape and re-arrest of the accused ==
P. Satyam Babu was first arrested in August 2008. However, he exhibited his agility soon after his arrest by escaping from police custody at Suryapet in Nalgonda district in the middle of the arrest night when the policemen escorting him got down at a hotel for food. Police were taking the accused to Vijayawada after treatment at a hospital in Hyderabad. The Vijayawada Police suspended 11 policemen, including a sub-inspector, two head constables and eight constables, who were escorting the accused on the charges of negligence. However, despite this effort to escape, Babu was arrested in Krishna district of Andhra Pradesh within hours of the event.

== Judicial judgement ==
The Vijayawada women's special sessions court awarded 14 years jail to P. Satyam Babu in the case under section 302 of IPC for murder and 10 years of rigorous imprisonment under section 376 of IPC for rape. The court ruled that both the jail terms would run concurrently. In addition, the court ordered Satyam Babu to pay a fine of Rs 1,000 or undergo six months jail.

In a landmark judgment on 31 March 2017, the Hyderabad High Court not only acquitted the accused in the murder case but also awarded him 1 lakhs compensation for putting him in jail for eight years. The court in its judgment reprimanded the police for putting the accused in jail for eight years. The court said it was inhuman on the part of the police and ordered action against the officials responsible for Satyam Babu's arrest and confinement.

High Court of Andhra Pradesh in its Judgement on 29 November 2018 by Chief Justice Thottathil B. Radhakrishnan and Justice S V Bhatt directed the Central Bureau of Investigation to investigate the case afresh and directed the Andhra Pradesh Police to hand over the case to Central Bureau of Investigation. The Court observed that a High Court administered probe by a SIT unearthed the fact that even before the appeal of acquitted Satyam Babu was pending there has been destruction of records in the Trial Court.

== Evidences and findings ==
The autopsy report of doctors informs that Ayesha's body has stab injuries and she has been raped and then murdered. Semen traces were extracted from her body and many bite marks and scratch marks were identified throughout her body.

== CBI investigation ==
In January 2019, as a part of the investigation, CBI team grilled Satyam Babu at his home in Anasagaram village in Nandigama mandal. They also visited Koneru Satish at his house in Gudavalli village and took his statements.
