= Mahajana Party =

Mahajana Party may refer to:

- Sri Lanka Mahajana Party, founded in 1984
- Lanka Mahajana Sabha, a Ceylonese political party founded in 1919
- Mahajana Socialist Party, an Indian political party founded in 2014
