= Andole Assembly constituency =

Constituency of the Telangana legislative assembly in India

Coordinates: 17.82°N 78.08°E

Andole
- Constituency No. 36 for the Telangana Legislative Assembly
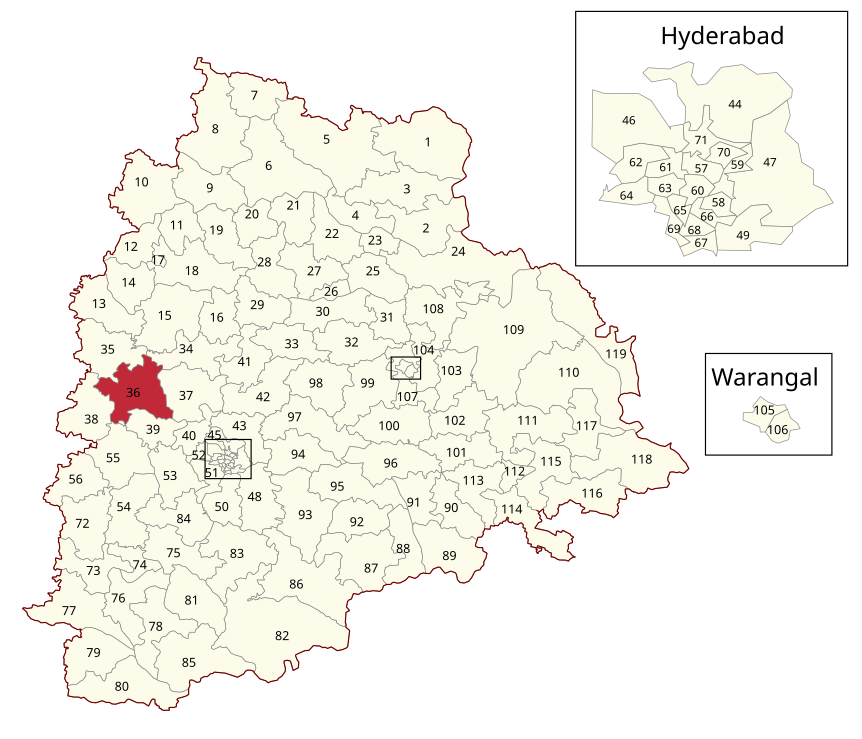
- Location of Andole Assembly constituency within Telangana

Constituency details
- Country: India
- Region: South India
- State: Telangana
- District: Medak
- Lok Sabha constituency: Zahirabad
- Established: 1951
- Total electors: 2,23,352
- Reservation: SC

Member of Legislative Assembly
- 3rd Telangana Legislative Assembly
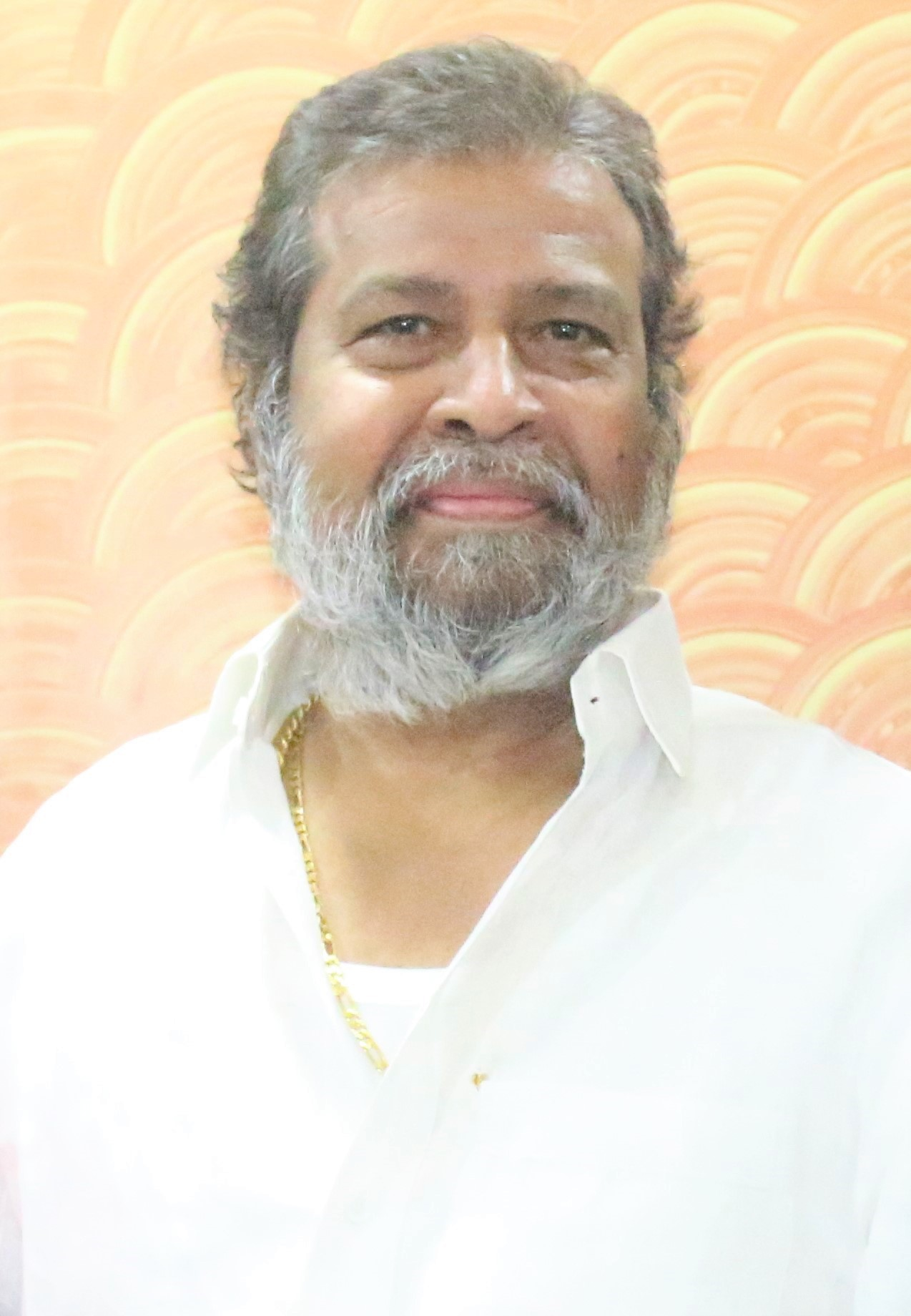
- Incumbent Damodar Raja Narasimha
- Party: Indian National Congress
- Elected year: 2023

Andole Assembly constituency is a SC reserved constituency of Telangana Legislative Assembly, India. It is one of five constituencies in Sangareddy district. It is part of Zahirabad Lok Sabha constituency.

Damodar Raja Narasimha is current MLA representing this constituency.

== Mandals ==
The Assembly constituency presently comprises the following mandals:

Mandal	Districts
Andole	Sangareddy
Alladurga	Medak
Regode	Medak
Raikode	Sangareddy
Tekmal	Medak
Munpalle	Sangareddy
Pulkal	Sangareddy

Vatpally

== Members of the Legislative Assembly ==
Election	Member	Party
1952	Luchman Kumar	Indian National Congress
1952	Venkat Rajeshwar Joshi	Indian National Congress
1957	Baswa Maniah	Independent politician
1962	S. L. Devi	Indian National Congress
1967	C. Rajanarasimha	Indian National Congress
1972	C. Rajanarasimha	Indian National Congress
1978	C. Rajanarasimha	Indian National Congress
1983	Hadkar Laxmanjee	Indian National Congress
1985	Malyala Rajaiah	Telugu Desam Party
1989	Damodar Raja Narasimha	Indian National Congress
1994	Malyala Rajaiah	Telugu Desam Party
1998 By-election	Pally Babu Mohan	Telugu Desam Party
1999	Pally Babu Mohan	Telugu Desam Party
2004	Damodar Raja Narasimha	Indian National Congress
2009	Damodar Raja Narasimha	Indian National Congress
2014	Pally Babu Mohan	Bharat Rashtra Samithi
2018	Chanti Kranthi Kiran	Bharat Rashtra Samithi
2023	Damodar Raja Narasimha	Indian National Congress

Hyderabad State
Andhra Pradesh

== Election results ==
=== Assembly Election 2023 ===
2023 Telangana Legislative Assembly election : Andole
Party	Candidate	Votes	%	±%
INC	Damodar Raja Narasimha	114,147	53.65%	▲9.01
BRS	Chanti Kranthi Kiran	85,954	40.40%	New
BJP	Babu Mohan Palli	5,524	2.60%	▲1.38
NOTA	None of the above	548	0.26%	▼0.51
Margin of victory		28,193	13.25%	▲4.88
Turnout		212,799	85.36%	▼3.95
Total valid votes		212,750		
Registered electors		249,301		▲12.33
INC gain from BRS		Swing	▲0.64	

=== Assembly Election 2018 ===
2018 Telangana Legislative Assembly election : Andole
Party	Candidate	Votes	%	±%
BRS	Chanti Kranthi Kiran	104,229	53.01%	▲4.44
INC	Damodar Raja Narasimha	87,764	44.64%	▼2.10
BJP	Pally Babu Mohan	2,404	1.22%	▼0.49
NOTA	None of the above	1,510	0.77%	▼0.05
Margin of victory		16,465	8.37%	▲6.53
Turnout		198,203	89.31%	▲9.58
Total valid votes		196,610		
Registered electors		221,931		▼2.14
BRS hold		Swing	▲4.44	

=== Assembly Election 2014 ===
2014 Telangana Legislative Assembly election : Andole
Party	Candidate	Votes	%	±%
BRS	Pally Babu Mohan	87,087	48.57%	New
INC	Damodar Raja Narasimha	83,796	46.74%	▲0.52
Independent	Allaram Rathnaiah	4,204	2.34%	New
BJP	Burri Yellaiah	3,062	1.71%	New
NOTA	None of the above	1,472	0.82%	New
Yuvajana Sramika Rythu Congress Party	Bandargalla Sanjeeva Rao	1,141	0.64%	New
Margin of victory		3,291	1.84%	▲0.13
Turnout		180,815	79.73%	▲4.40
Total valid votes		179,290		
Registered electors		226,779		▲0.20
BRS gain from INC		Swing	▲2.35	

=== Assembly Election 2009 ===
2009 Andhra Pradesh Legislative Assembly election : Andole
Party	Candidate	Votes	%	±%
INC	Damodar Raja Narasimha	78,671	46.22%	▼12.03
TDP	P. Babu Mohan	75,765	44.51%	▲7.64
PRP	Malyala Rajaiah Srinivas	5,257	3.09%	New
Independent	Chanti Kranthi Kiran	4,282	2.52%	New
Independent	Kondi Mogulaiah	2,625	1.54%	New
BSP	M. Balaiah	2,546	1.50%	▼0.40
Independent	Ayancha Arun Chakravarthy	1,072	0.63%	New
Margin of victory		2,906	1.71%	▼19.67
Turnout		170,479	75.33%	▼3.45
Total valid votes		170,218		
Registered electors		226,321		▲53.39
INC hold		Swing	▼12.03	

=== Assembly Election 2004 ===
2004 Andhra Pradesh Legislative Assembly election : Andole
Party	Candidate	Votes	%	±%
INC	Damodar Raja Narasimha	67,703	58.25%	▲9.15
TDP	P. Babu Mohan	42,857	36.87%	▼12.73
BSP	Pottigari Venkatesham	2,206	1.90%	New
Independent	Manne Bharathi	1,957	1.68%	New
Independent	Jangam Maheshwar	1,026	0.88%	New
Independent	Bachamolla Manikyam	723	0.62%	New
Margin of victory		24,846	21.38%	▲20.88
Turnout		116,246	78.78%	▲2.51
Total valid votes		116,235		
Rejected ballots		11	0.01%	▼3.58
Registered electors		147,549		▲5.08
INC gain from TDP		Swing	▲8.65	

=== Assembly Election 1999 ===
1999 Andhra Pradesh Legislative Assembly election : Andole
Party	Candidate	Votes	%	±%
TDP	Pally Babu Mohan	51,215	49.60%	▼5.09
INC	Damodar Raja Narasimha	50,702	49.10%	▲4.91
Margin of victory		513	0.50%	▼10.00
Turnout		107,098	76.27%	▲3.83
Total valid votes		103,254		
Rejected ballots		3,844	3.59%	▲3.59
Registered electors		140,422		▲0.34
TDP hold		Swing	▼5.09	

=== Assembly By-election 1998 ===
1998 Andhra Pradesh Legislative Assembly by-election : Andole
Party	Candidate	Votes	%	±%
TDP	Pally Babu Mohan	54,963	54.69%	▼1.33
INC	Damodar Raja Narasimha	44,409	44.19%	▲9.51
BSP	Palle Sanjeevaiah	992	0.99%	▼2.40
Margin of victory		10,554	10.50%	▼10.84
Turnout		101,375	72.44%	▼4.55
Total valid votes		100,497		
Registered electors		139,947		▲8.26
TDP hold		Swing	▼1.33	

=== Assembly Election 1994 ===
1994 Andhra Pradesh Legislative Assembly election : Andole
Party	Candidate	Votes	%	±%
TDP	Malyala Rajaiah	54,486	56.02%	▲8.97
INC	Damodar Raja Narasimha	33,727	34.68%	▼15.74
BSP	Palle Sanjeevaiah	3,301	3.39%	New
BJP	Mugiti Devender	3,284	3.38%	New
Independent	Manne Vijay Kumar	2,378	2.45%	New
Margin of victory		20,759	21.34%	▲17.98
Turnout		99,523	76.99%	▲6.41
Total valid votes		97,255		
Rejected ballots		2,268	2.28%	▼1.67
Registered electors		129,265		▼2.22
TDP gain from INC		Swing	▲5.60	

=== Assembly Election 1989 ===
1989 Andhra Pradesh Legislative Assembly election : Andole
Party	Candidate	Votes	%	±%
INC	Damodar Raja Narasimha	45,183	50.42%	▲38.01
TDP	Malyala Rajaiah	42,169	47.05%	▼3.24
Independent	Manne Krishotham	853	0.95%	New
Independent	Santi Prabhu	583	0.65%	New
Margin of victory		3,014	3.36%	▼19.45
Turnout		93,303	70.58%	▲4.32
Total valid votes		89,620		
Rejected ballots		3,683	3.95%	▲2.17
Registered electors		132,199		▲19.17
INC gain from TDP		Swing	▲0.13	

=== Assembly Election 1985 ===
1985 Andhra Pradesh Legislative Assembly election : Andole
Party	Candidate	Votes	%	±%
TDP	Malyala Rajaiah	36,306	50.29%	New
Independent	C. Rajanarasimha	19,843	27.49%	New
INC	Hatkari Laxmanji	8,959	12.41%	▼37.35
Independent	M. G. Laxminath Dharmaveer	3,072	4.26%	New
Independent	J. Eshwari Bai	2,004	2.78%	New
Independent	Prasad Rao	1,131	1.57%	New
Independent	Myathri Anthaiah	548	0.76%	New
Margin of victory		16,463	22.81%	▲5.15
Turnout		73,497	66.26%	▲4.35
Total valid votes		72,187		
Rejected ballots		1,310	1.78%	▼0.78
Registered electors		110,930		▲12.37
TDP gain from INC		Swing	▲0.53	

=== Assembly Election 1983 ===
1983 Andhra Pradesh Legislative Assembly election : Andole
Party	Candidate	Votes	%	±%
INC	Hadkar Laxmanjee	29,630	49.76%	▲10.68
Independent	J. Eshwari Bai	19,115	32.10%	New
Independent	Yadiah Dappa	5,826	9.78%	New
Independent	M. G. Laxminath Dharmaveer	2,171	3.65%	New
Independent	Kamtini Devaiah	1,344	2.26%	New
Independent	Adla Sadanand	931	1.56%	New
Independent	Kannarapu Pochaiah	532	0.89%	New
Margin of victory		10,515	17.66%	▲16.43
Turnout		61,115	61.91%	▼4.56
Total valid votes		59,549		
Rejected ballots		1,566	2.56%	▼0.47
Registered electors		98,716		▲6.25
INC hold		Swing	▲10.68	

=== Assembly Election 1978 ===
1978 Andhra Pradesh Legislative Assembly election : Andole
Party	Candidate	Votes	%	±%
INC	C. Rajanarasimha	23,403	39.08%	▼23.76
INC(I)	A. Sadanand	22,665	37.85%	New
JP	Laxman Kumar	13,821	23.08%	New
Margin of victory		738	1.23%	▼26.13
Turnout		61,763	66.47%	▲1.46
Total valid votes		59,889		
Rejected ballots		1,874	3.03%	▲3.03
Registered electors		92,912		▲14.81
INC hold		Swing	▼23.76	

=== Assembly Election 1972 ===
1972 Andhra Pradesh Legislative Assembly election : Andole
Party	Candidate	Votes	%	±%
INC	C. Rajanarasimha	31,923	62.84%	▲6.32
Independent	Laxman Kumar	18,022	35.48%	New
TPS	Ambadas Rao	855	1.68%	New
Margin of victory		13,901	27.36%	▲2.92
Turnout		52,611	65.01%	▲4.65
Total valid votes		50,800		
Registered electors		80,927		▲15.78
INC hold		Swing	▲6.32	

=== Assembly Election 1967 ===
1967 Andhra Pradesh Legislative Assembly election : Andole
Party	Candidate	Votes	%	±%
INC	C. Rajanarasimha	22,562	56.52%	▼22.27
Independent	K. Eshwarappa	12,805	32.08%	New
Independent	G. Asaiah	2,916	7.30%	New
RPI	K. Anthaiah	1,638	4.10%	New
Margin of victory		9,757	24.44%	▼33.15
Turnout		42,188	60.36%	▲4.40
Total valid votes		39,921		
Registered electors		69,898		▲13.28
INC hold		Swing	▼22.27	

=== Assembly Election 1962 ===
1962 Andhra Pradesh Legislative Assembly election : Andole
Party	Candidate	Votes	%	±%
INC	S. L. Devi	25,976	78.79%	▲37.82
Independent	Basva Manaiah	6,991	21.21%	New
Margin of victory		18,985	57.59%	▲39.53
Turnout		34,529	55.96%	▲1.03
Total valid votes		32,967		
Registered electors		61,705		▲8.93
INC gain from Independent		Swing	▲19.76	

=== Assembly Election 1957 ===
1957 Andhra Pradesh Legislative Assembly election : Andole
Party	Candidate	Votes	%	±%
Independent	Baswa Maniah	18,365	59.03%	New
INC	Md. Ruknuddin	12,747	40.97%	▼20.71
Margin of victory		5,618	18.06%	▼4.99
Turnout		31,112	54.93%	▼30.28
Total valid votes		31,112		
Registered electors		56,644		▼46.54
Independent gain from INC		Swing	▲25.80	

=== Assembly Election 1952 ===
1952 Hyderabad State Legislative Assembly election : Andole
Party	Candidate	Votes	%	±%
INC	Luchman Kumar	30,002	33.23%	New
INC	Venkat Rajeshwar Joshi	25,682	28.45%	New
SP	Baswa Maniah	9,193	10.18%	New
SP	Pochiah	8,015	8.88%	New
Independent	Bachu Venkatesham	7,738	8.57%	New
Independent	Veerkumar	6,227	6.90%	New
SCF	Antiah	3,419	3.79%	New
Margin of victory		20,809	23.05%	
Turnout		90,276	42.60%	
Total valid votes		90,276		
Registered electors		105,948		
INC win (new seat)				

== See also ==
- List of constituencies of Telangana Legislative Assembly
