= Pedda Porla =

Pedda Porla is a small village located in Utkoor Mandal, Makthal Constituency, Narayanpet District, Telangana, India.

== Etymology ==
Its very name derives from village containing big farms (pedda porla).
