= MRPS =

MRPS may refer to:

- Madiga Reservation Porata Samiti
- Montpelier Roxbury Public Schools
