= Dirisam Padma Jyothi =

Indian politician

Dirisam Padma Jyothi is an Indian politician from Andhra Pradesh. She is a former member of the Andhra Pradesh Legislative Assembly from Tiruvuru Assembly constituency, which is reserved for the Scheduled Caste community, in Krishna district. She was last elected in the 2009 Andhra Pradesh Legislative Assembly election representing the Indian National Congress.

== Early life ==
Jyothi is from Tiruvuru, Krishna district, Andhra Pradesh.

== Career ==
Jyothi was first elected as an MLA from Tiruvuru Assembly constituency representing the Indian National Congress in the 2009 Andhra Pradesh Legislative Assembly election. She polled 63,624 votes and defeated her nearest rival, Nallagatla Swamy Das of the Telugu Desam Party, by a margin of 265 votes.

In March 2021, she joined the YSR Congress Party in Tadepalli YSRCP office.
