= Chanti =

Chanti may refer to:

- Chanti (1992 film), a 1992 Telugu film starring Daggubati Venkatesh
- Chanti (2004 film), a 2004 Telugu film starring Ravi Teja
- Chanti Kranthi Kiran, Indian journalist and politician
- Angelos Chanti (born 1989), Greek footballer

== See also ==
- Maa Ayana Chanti Pilladu, a 2008 Telugu film directed by Raja Vannem Reddy
