= T. Rajaiah =

Indian politician

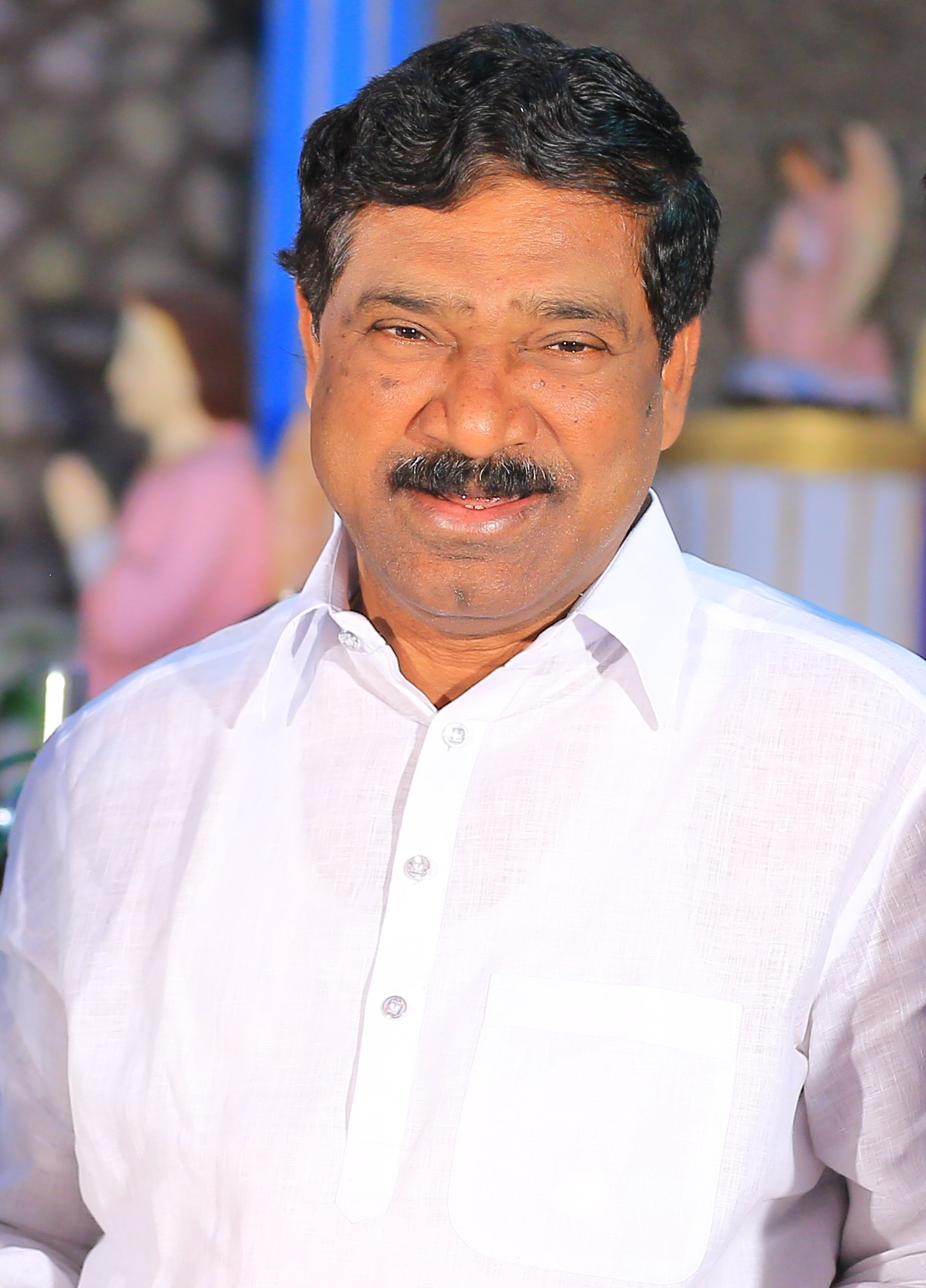

2nd Deputy Chief Minister of Telangana
- In office 2014–2015 Serving with Mohammed Ali
- Governor: E. S. L. Narasimhan
- Chief Minister: K. Chandrashekar Rao
- Preceded by: Position Established
- Succeeded by: Kadiyam Srihari

Member of Legislative Assembly, Telangana
- In office 2 June 2014 – 3 December 2023
- Preceded by: Telangana Assembly Created
- Succeeded by: Kadiyam Srihari
- Constituency: Station Ghanpur

Member of Legislative Assembly Andhra Pradesh
- In office 2009–2014
- Preceded by: Kadiyam Srihari
- Succeeded by: Telangana Assembly Created
- Constituency: Station Ghanpur

Personal details
- Born: 2 March 1960 (age 66) Warangal, Telangana, India
- Party: BRS (2011 - 2024 February 3 & 14 April 2024 - Present)
- Other political affiliations: INC (1997—2011) (3 February 2024 -14 April 2024)
- Spouse: Smt. Fathima Mary
- Children: 2
- Occupation: Medical practitioner, politician

Dr. Thatikonda Rajaiah (born 2 March 1960) is an Indian politician and medical practitioner. He has been serving as the Member of the Legislative Assembly (MLA) for the Station Ghanpur assembly constituency since the year 2009, representing the Bharat Rashtra Samithi. In his political journey, Rajaiah started as a member of the Indian National Congress but later joined the Bharat Rashtra Samithi (BRS) party to support the separate Telangana state movement. He was sworn in as Deputy Chief Minister of Telangana state with the Department of Health and Family Welfare on 2 June 2014 along with Md. Mohamood Ali.

== Personal life ==
Dr. Thatikonda Rajaiah was born in Thatikonda, a village situated in the Station Ghanpur mandal, Jangaon district in the state of Telangana, India. His parents were Marapaka Venkataya and Lakshmi. Their family name was originally Marapaka, but it changed to Thatikonda as they were from Tatikonda village. Dr. Rajaiah completed his MBBS degree in 1981 from Kakatiya Medical College in Warangal.

When Rajaiah was a student, he had a passion for revolutionary ideas and actively participated in PDSU. From 1984 to 1988, he held the position of General Secretary in the Junior Doctors Association. During his active years, he organized free medical camps in the Station Ghanpur constituency every Sunday and Wednesday. Rajaiah played a significant role in the Madiga Reservation Porata Samiti (MRPS) movement, as a Madiga doctor, advocating for the rights of his caste and fighting for self-respect. With government approval, he was the first to erect an Ambedkar statue in the Warangal district.

== Political career ==
T. Rajaiah became a member of the Indian National Congress in the year 1997. In the Andhra Pradesh State Assembly Elections of 2009, he emerged victorious in the Station Ghanpur Assembly constituency, representing the Congress party, defeating Kadiyam Srihari.

However, he chose to resign from his position as an MLA in 2011 and departed from the Congress party to extend his support to the separate Telangana state movement. Subsequently, on 30 October 2011, he joined the Bharat Rashtra Samithi (BRS) party. In the by-elections of 2012, he secured another victory, this time as a representative of the TRS party, with Kadiyam Srihari once again being his opponent who was in Telugu Desam Party at that time.

Following the formation of the Telangana state, he won again from Station Ghanpur in 2014 by a margin of 58,829 votes. He was appointed as the Deputy Chief Minister for the government of Telangana in the first K. Chandrashekar Rao ministry coinciding with Telangana State Formation Day on 2 June 2014. However on January 25, 2015, Chief Minister K. Chandrasekhar Rao (KCR) took the decision to remove Rajaiah as Deputy Chief Minister and Health Minister, due to adverse reports about his performance and his failure to implement preventive measures against swine flu in Telangana.

Continuing his political career, Rajaiah achieved yet another victory in the 2018 assembly elections from Station Ghanpur, marking his fourth consecutive win in the constituency.

Thatikonda Rajaiah was denied MLA ticket from the BRS party for 2023 Telangana legislative assembly elections. He was appointed as chairman of Rythu Bandhu Samithi on 5 October 2023.

T Rajaiah resigned from the BRS party primary membership on 3 February 2024.

Thatikonda Rajaiah re-joined informally in Bharat Rashtra Samithi (BRS) party in the presence of BRS president and former chief minister K. Chandrasekhar Rao at Erravelli farm house on 14 April 2024.

== Controversies ==
September 2014

During Kaloji centenary celebrations event at NIT, Warangal, Rajaiah promised to establish a Health University for Warangal, seemingly without the direction of Telangana Chief Minister KCR. Speaking in the same event, KCR remarked, "Here is our Deputy Chief Minister Mr. Rajaiah. He says he would set up a Health University wherever he goes. Can you do it?" He followed this by saying, "ollu daggara pettukuni matladu," which loosely translates to "guard your tongue before speaking".

This comment which did not go well among the Madiga caste members, including Manda Krishna Madiga. He criticized KCR for allegedly conspiring to remove Rajaiah from his Deputy Chief Minister position. In front of a large audience, the Deputy Chief Minister, who belonged to the Dalit community, faced humiliation, and KCR's behavior was perceived as disrespectful and damaging to the self-esteem of Dalits. It was speculated that KCR preferred not to have his ministers make promises independently, as he wanted to take credit for all the government's schemes and programs. Bakka Judson, TPCC leader, filed a complaint with the National Commission for Scheduled Castes, alleging insult to Rajaiah. Judson demanded an apology from KCR and called for Rajaiah's resignation as Deputy CM if no apology is given to protect Dalit self-respect.

January 2015

Charges of corruption in the Telangana's medical and health department surfaced and indicated Deputy Chief Minister Thaikonda Rajaiah's involvement or 'tacit ignorance' of illegal actions in the department. While Rajaiah's dismissal appeared to have been on the cards for quite a time since September, 2014 when he promised a Health University for Warangal seemingly without Telangana CM Kalvakuntla Chandrashekar's direction.

Chief minister's political secretary S Subhash Reddy said, "The developments were on expected lines. The matter of corruption charges against a minister is a serious one."

Rajaiah has earned the dubious distinction of being the First Minister in Telangana to be sacked. Allegations of corruption against the health and medical department include irregularities in recruitment of para-medical staff and purchase of ambulance vehicles.

In a last ditch effort to defend himself, Rajaiah had written to the chief minister seeking forgiveness for his omissions and commissions, but to no avail.

On 25 January 2015, before Republic Day, Rajaiah was "supposedly" sacked for his behavior. His duties were transferred to a Bindla caste member (non-madiga) member Kadiyam Srihari who is also from Warangal, in order not to lose the Scheduled Caste vote bank. Mr. Srihari was considered the hidden hand behind the Madiga movement for categorisation of Scheduled Castes, he belonged to the Bindla community which is a sub caste of Madiga.

== Madiga community's response ==
MRPS founder and president Manda Krishna lashed out at Telangana Chief Minister K. Chandrasekhar Rao for firing Deputy Chief Minister T. Rajaiah and said it amounted to insulting the community on the whole. While not exactly spelling out his future course of action, the MRPS leader said he would chalk out an action plan on the ouster of Dr. Rajaiah soon but reiterated that the 'Madigas' would not rest until justice was done. He regretted that Dr. Rajaiah was not even given an opportunity to explain his position. "The way he was denied even an appointment with the Chief Minister and removed solely on the basis of an allegation is mysterious and that is what is insulting," he said.

The fight of the weaker sections has always been for self-esteem alone and the way Dr. Rajaiah was unceremoniously shown the door only holds mirror to the continued oppression of the weaker sections by upper castes, he said, adding that they would take the struggle forward. The Chief Minister owed people an explanation of how and under what circumstances Dr. Rajaiah was removed and the demand for an apology for such a treatment was justified, Mr. Krishna said.

== Hospitalized ==
Rajaiah suffered a heart attack and was admitted in Hyderguda Apollo Hospital, Hyderabad on 27 January 2015. The former Deputy Chief Minister who was fired by Telangana Chief Minister K. Chandrasekhar Rao on Sunday on charges of corruption in the Health Department, was hospitalized on Tuesday evening after complaining of pain in the chest.
