= Revanth =

Revanth may refer to:

- Revanth Reddy, Indian politician
  - Revanth Reddy ministry, the third cabinet of the Indian state of Telangana under the leadership of Revanth Reddy
- L. V. Revanth, Indian singer
