= Nallagatla Swamy Das =

Indian politician

Swamy Das Nallagatla

MLA, United Andhra Pradesh
- In office 1994–2004
- Preceded by: Koneru Ranga Rao
- Succeeded by: Koneru Ranga Rao
- Constituency: Tiruvuru

Personal details
- Born: October 4, 1963 (age 62) Anumollanka, Gampalagudem mandal, Krishna District, Andhra Pradesh
- Party: YSR Congress Party (2024-present)
- Other political affiliations: Telugu Desam Party (1994-2024)
- Spouse: Sudha Rani Nallagatla
- Education: M.A., M.Ed., M.Phil.
- Alma mater: Osmania University, Hyderabad, Telangana
- Occupation: Politician

Nallagatla Swamy Das (born 4 October 1963) is an Indian politician from Anumollanka, NTR district of Andhra Pradesh. He was twice elected as Member of Legislative Assembly in Andhra Pradesh during the years 1994-2004 representing Telugu Desam Party from the Tiruvuru Assembly constituency. In 2024 he joined YSR Congress Party prior to the 2024 Andhra Pradesh Legislative Assembly election.

== Early political career ==
Swamy Das entered politics as a Student leader when he was a student at S.R. & B.G.N.R. Govt. Degree College. He was again elected as a Student Union leader for TNSF while studying at Osmania. At first he supported the Communist Party Of India[CPI/CPM]. In 1993 he entered the Telugu Desam Party. He won two elections against Koneru Rangarao, the reigning M.L.A. of Tiruvuru who was also The Deputy Chief minister of Andhra Pradesh at that time.

== Legislative career 1994–2014 ==
Swamy Das was TDP's contesting candidate five times in a row from Tiruvuru Constituency. In 2014, Swamy Das contested general elections representing the Telugu Desam Party, but lost in a close vote to Kokkiligadda Rakshana Nidhi.

== Electoral performance ==
S.No	Year	Election	Constituency	Party	Votes	Vote %	Margin	Result
1	1994	MLA	Tiruvuru	Telugu Desam Party	64,035	51.92	+7,986	Won
2	1999	MLA	Tiruvuru	Telugu Desam Party	61,206	47.69	+1,083	Won
3	2004	MLA	Tiruvuru	Telugu Desam Party	60,355	42.87	-16,769	Lost
4	2009	MLA	Tiruvuru	Telugu Desam Party	63,359	43.02	-265	Lost
5	2014	MLA	Tiruvuru	Telugu Desam Party	76,468	46.87	-1,676	Lost
6	2024	MLA	Tiruvuru	YSR Congress Party	78,845	43.75	-21,874	Lost

== Personal life ==
Swamy Das met his life partner, N. Sudha Rani when he was attending Osmania University where she was studying M.Sc.(Chemistry). They married in 1990 and the couple have one son. Rani resigned her Group one post and joined her husband in politics and was elected as Zilla Parishath Chairperson for Krishna District from Nandigama during the years 2004-2008. In 2013 she is the Telugu Desam Party women's wing Secretary for the State.
