= Chittem Narsi Reddy =

Indian politician

Chittem Narsi Reddy (also spelled Chitlem or Chittam; died 15 August 2005) was an Indian political leader. He was member of Indian National Congress. He was only member of Janata Dal in Andhra Pradesh Legislative Assembly. He was elected from Makthal constituency in 1984 on Janata Party ticket and in 1989 on Janata Dal ticket and 2004 Indian National Congress ticket.
