= Vakiti Srihari =

Indian politician (born 1972)

Vakiti Srihari Mudhiraj

Minister for Animal Husbandry, Dairy Development & Fisheries, Sports & Youth Services Government of Telangana
- Incumbent
- Assumed office 8 June 2025

Member of Telangana Legislative Assembly
- Incumbent
- Assumed office 3 December 2023
- Preceded by: Chittem Rammohan Reddy
- Constituency: Makthal

Personal details
- Born: 1972 (age 53–54) Makthal, Telangana
- Party: Indian National Congress
- Spouse: Lalitha
- Parent(s): Vakati Narsimulu, Ramulamma

Vakiti Srihari (born 1972) is an Indian politician from Telangana state. He is a member of the Telangana Legislative Assembly from Makthal Assembly constituency in Narayanpet district. He represents the Indian National Congress and was elected as an MLA in the 2023 Telangana Legislative Assembly election.

He was appointed as In charge minister for Khammam District on 12 June 2025.

== Early life and education ==
Srihari is from Makthal, Narayanpet district, Telangana. His father, Vakiti Narasimhulu, is a farmer. He is a graduate.

== Career ==
Srihari won from Makthal Assembly constituency representing the Indian National Congress in the 2023 Telangana Legislative Assembly election. He polled 74,917 votes and defeated his nearest rival, Chittem Rammohan Reddy of the Bharat Rashtra Samithi, by a margin of 17,525 votes.

Vakiti Srihari took oath as Minister in Revanth Reddy's Cabinet on Sunday 8 June 2025. He was allocated Animal Husbandry, Dairy Development and Fisheries, Sports, and Youth Affairs ministries on 11 June 2025.

Vakiti Srihari assumed charge as Minister of Animal Husbandry and Sports at Dr. B.R. Ambedkar Telangana State Secretariat on 16 June 2025.
