= Mahadiga (film) =

- Directed by: Lelle Suresh
- Release date: 2004
- Country: India

Mahadiga is a documentary film about the Madiga Scheduled Caste community, directed by Lelle Suresh. It was released in 2004.
