= Mahajana Socialist Party =

People's Socialist Party Mahajana Socialist Party
- Founder: Manda Krishna Madiga
- Founded: 4 January 2014
- Ideology: Socialism
- Political position: Left-wing
- Colors: Blue

The Mahajana Socialist Party is a political party in Telangana and Andhra Pradesh, India. The party was founded by Manda Krishna Madiga on 4 January 2014, who became its president. The flag of the party displays a rising sun on blue background.

The party fielded three candidates in the 2014 Lok Sabha election, standing in Eluru, Peddapalli and Rajampet.
