= Dhanwada =

- village
- Location in Telangana, India Dhanwada (India)
- Coordinates: 16.6500°N 77.6667°E
- Country: India
- State: Telangana
- District: Mahaboob Nagar
- Elevation: 419 m (1,375 ft)

Languages
  - Official: Telugu
- Time zone: UTC+5:30 (IST)
- Vehicle registration: TS06
- Climate: hot (Köppen)
- Website: www.infomahabubnagar.com

Dhanwada or Dhanvada is a mandal in the Narayanpet district of Telangana, India. This mandal is part of the Narayanapet Assembly Constituency and the Mahbubnagar Loksabha Constituency.

== Geography ==
Dhanwada is located at 16.6500°N 77.6667°E. It has an average elevation of 419 metres (1,375 ft).

== Institutions ==
- Zilla Parishad High School
- Andhra Bank
- TS Model School
- Government Junior College
- Kasturba Gandhi High School
- Mahindra Solar Power Park

== Temples ==
- Venkataramana Temple
- Markandeyaswamy Temple
- Veerabadhraswamy Temple
- Shirdi Sai Temple

== Villages ==
The villages in Dhanwada Mandal include:

- Appampally
- Cherlapally
- Dhanwada
- Gotur
- Gunmukla
- Hanmanpalle
- Kamsanpalle
- Kistapur
- Kondapur
- Madwar
- Mandipalle
- Marikal
- Paspula
- Peddachintakunta
- Poosalpad
- Rakonda
- Ramakistaiahpalle
- Teelair
- Yeligandla
