= Tiruvuru Assembly constituency =

Constituency of the Andhra Pradesh Legislative Assembly, India

Coordinates: 17.11°N 80.61°E

Tiruvuru
- Constituency No. 69 for the Andhra Pradesh Legislative Assembly
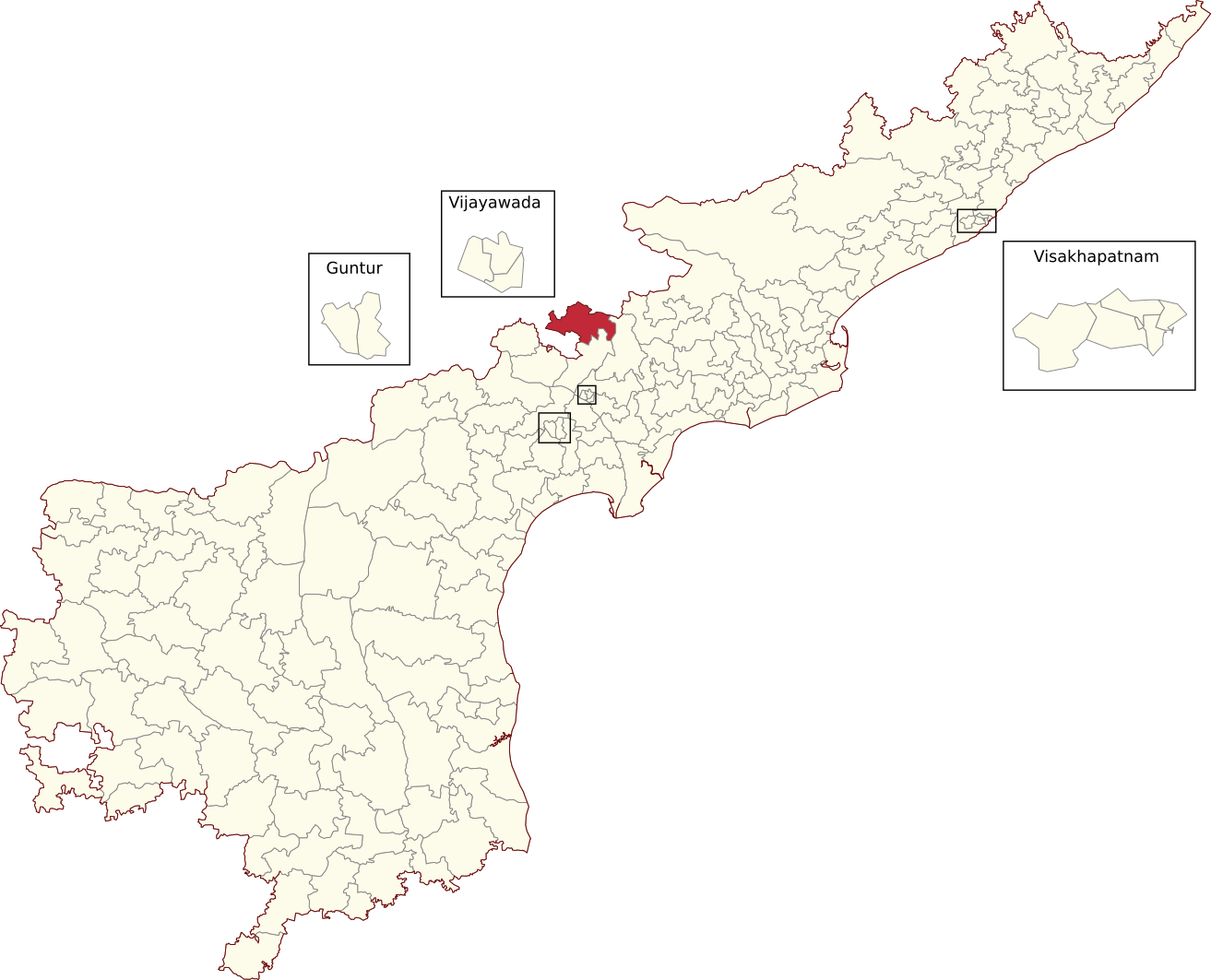
- Location of Tiruvuru Assembly constituency within Andhra Pradesh

Constituency details
- Country: India
- Region: South India
- State: Andhra Pradesh
- District: NTR
- Lok Sabha constituency: Vijayawada
- Established: 1951
- Total electors: 2,03,404
- Reservation: SC

Member of Legislative Assembly
- 16th Andhra Pradesh Legislative Assembly
- Incumbent Kolikapudi Srinivasa Rao
- Party: TDP
- Alliance: NDA
- Elected year: 2024

Tiruvuru is a Scheduled Caste reserved constituency in NTR district of Andhra Pradesh that elects represtatives to the Andhra Pradesh Legislative Assembly in India. It is one of the seven assembly segments of Vijayawada Lok Sabha constituency.

Kolikapudi Srinivasa Rao is the current MLA of the constituency, having won the 2024 Andhra Pradesh Legislative Assembly election from Telugu Desam Party. As of 2019, there are a total of 203,404 electors in the constituency. The constituency was established in 1951, as per the Delimitation Orders (1951).

== Mandals ==
The four mandals that form the assembly constituency are:

Mandal	Population
A. Konduru	48,463
Gampalagudem	71,544
Tiruvuru	76,731
Vissannapet	59,798

== Members of the Legislative Assembly ==
Year	Member	Political party
1952	Peta Rama Rao	Communist Party of India
1955	Peta Bapayya	Indian National Congress
1962	Peta Bapayya	Indian National Congress
1967	V. Kurmayya	Indian National Congress
1972	Kota Ramaiah	Indian National Congress
1978	Vakkalagadda Adamu	Indian National Congress (I)
1983	Miryala Poornand	Telugu Desam Party
1985	Pitta Venkatarathnam	Telugu Desam Party
1989	Koneru Ranga Rao	Indian National Congress
1994	Nallagatla Swamy Das	Telugu Desam Party
1999	Nallagatla Swamy Das	Telugu Desam Party
2004	Koneru Ranga Rao	Indian National Congress
2009	Dirisam Padma Jyothi	Indian National Congress
2014	Kokkiligadda Rakshana Nidhi	YSR Congress Party
2019	Kokkiligadda Rakshana Nidhi	YSR Congress Party
2024	Kolikapudi Srinivasa Rao	Telugu Desam Party

== Election results ==
=== 2024 ===
2024 Andhra Pradesh Legislative Assembly election: Tiruvuru (SC)
Party	Candidate	Votes	%	±%
TDP	Kolikapudi Srinivasa Rao	100,719	54.91	
YSRCP	Nallagatla Swamy Das	78,845	42.99	
INC	Lam Thantiya Kumari	1,329	0.72	
NOTA	None of the above	1,184	0.65	
Majority		21,874	11.92	
Turnout		1,83,420		
TDP gain from YSRCP		Swing		

=== 2019 ===
2019 Andhra Pradesh Legislative Assembly election: Tiruvuru (SC)
Party	Candidate	Votes	%	±%
YSRCP	Kokkiligadda Rakshana Nidhi	89,118	50.73	
TDP	Kothapalli Samuel Jawahar	78,283	44.56	
BSP	Namburi Srinivasa Rao	3,320	1.89	
INC	Rajiv Ratan Parasa	1,866	1.06	
NOTA	None of the above	1,749	1	
BJP	Pole Santhi	361	0.21	
Majority		10,835	6.14	
Turnout		1,76,453	86.75	
Registered electors		203,436		
YSRCP hold		Swing		

=== 2014 ===
2014 Andhra Pradesh Legislative Assembly election: Tiruvuru (SC)
Party	Candidate	Votes	%	±%
YSRCP	Kokkiligadda Rakshana Nidhi	78,144	47.90	
TDP	Nallagatla Swamy Das	76,468	46.87	
INC	Parasa Rajiv Rathan	3,379	2.07	
CPI(M)	Prabhakara Rao Marsakatla	1,332	0.82	
Independent	Dhomathoti Subhakar	592	0.36	
Pyramid Party Of India	Vemiri Ramesh Babu	488	0.30	
Majority		1,676	1.03	
Turnout		163,139	87.24	+5.99
Registered electors		187,072		
YSRCP gain from INC		Swing		

=== 2009 ===
2009 Andhra Pradesh Legislative Assembly election: Tiruvuru (SC)
Party	Candidate	Votes	%	±%
INC	Dirisam Padma Jyothi	63,624	43.19	+11.59
TDP	Nallagatla Swamy Das	63,359	43.02	+0.15
PRP	Vakkalagadda Vijaya Bhaskara Rao	11,484	7.80	
BJP	Chitti Babu Gurindapalli	2,952	2.00	
Trilinga Praja Pragathi Party	Gaddala Adam	1,437	0.98	
BSP	Donelli Ratna Sekhar	1,315	0.89	
Majority		265	0.17	
Turnout		147,295	81.85	+1.57
Registered electors		179,958		
INC hold		Swing		

=== 2004 ===
2004 Andhra Pradesh Legislative Assembly election: Tiruvuru (SC)
Party	Candidate	Votes	%	±%
INC	Koneru Ranga Rao	77,124	54.78	+7.94
TDP	Nallagatla Swamy Das	60,355	42.87	−4.82
BSP	Malladi Adiyya (Alias) Ashok	1,508	1.07	
CPI(M)	Durgam Pulla Rao	765	0.54	
Independent	Kothapalli Venkateshwara Rao	249	0.17	
Independent	Kallepalle Tulasamma	228	0.16	
Majority		16,769	11.91	
Turnout		140,789	80.28	+1.21
Registered electors		175,378		
INC gain from TDP		Swing		

=== 1999 ===
1999 Andhra Pradesh Legislative Assembly election: Tiruvuru (SC)
Party	Candidate	Votes	%	±%
TDP	Nallagatla Swamy Das	61,206	47.69	
INC	Koneru Ranga Rao	60,123	46.84	
CPI(M)	Prabhakara Rao Marsakatla	5599	4.36	
CPI(ML)L	Prabhakara Rao Mesapam	949	0.74	
NTRTDP(LP)	Modugu Vara Prasada Rao	321	0.25	
Independent	Adam Vakkalagadda	147	0.11	
Margin of victory		1,083	0.84	
Turnout		130,968	80.68	
Registered electors		162,322		
TDP hold		Swing		

=== 1994 ===
1994 Andhra Pradesh Legislative Assembly election: Tiruvuru (SC)
Party	Candidate	Votes	%	±%
TDP	Nallagatla Swamy Das	64,035	51.92	
INC	Koneru Ranga Rao	56,049	45.44	
BJP	Venkata Rathnam Pitta	935	0.76	
BSP	Nandeti Prabhakara Rao	910	0.74	
Independent	Mesapam Prabhakara Rao	516	0.42	
Rastreeya Praja Parishat	Gadam Venkateshwara Rao	237	0.19	
Margin of victory		7,986	6.47	
Turnout		124,777	84.46	
Registered electors		147,737		
TDP gain from INC		Swing		

=== 1989 ===
1989 Andhra Pradesh Legislative Assembly election: Tiruvuru (SC)
Party	Candidate	Votes	%	±%
INC	Koneru Ranga Rao	55,016	50.11	
TDP	Kothapalli Ravindranadh	53,021	48.29	
Independent	Modugu Vara Prasadrao	410	0.37	
Independent	Bodapati Baburao	393	0.36	
Independent	Chilaparapu Hemalatha	355	0.32	
Independent	Gattigunde Prakasam	334	0.30	
Margin of victory		1,995	1.82	
Turnout		112,180	81.81	
Registered electors		137,115		
INC gain from TDP		Swing		

=== 1985 ===
1985 Andhra Pradesh Legislative Assembly election: Tiruvuru (SC)
Party	Candidate	Votes	%	±%
TDP	Pitta Venkataratnam	46,374	56.326%	
Independent	Modugu Raghavulu	34,421	41.76%	
Margin of victory		11,953	14.50%	
Turnout		83,227	73.52%	
Registered electors		113,200		
TDP hold		Swing		

=== 1983 ===
1983 Andhra Pradesh Legislative Assembly election: Tiruvuru (SC)
Party	Candidate	Votes	%	±%
TDP	Poornand Miryala	31,507	42.12%	
INC	Sri Kanthayya	28,994	38.76%	
Margin of victory		2,513	3.36%	
Turnout		76,125	75.61%	
Registered electors		100,681		
TDP gain from INC(I)		Swing		

=== 1978 ===
1978 Andhra Pradesh Legislative Assembly election: Tiruvuru (SC)
Party	Candidate	Votes	%	±%
INC(I)	Vakkalagadda Adamu	30,057	40.33%	
JP	Kota Punnaiah	24,773	33.24%	
INC(I)	Kota Ramayya	16,860	22.62%	
Margin of victory		5,284	7.09%	
Turnout		76,176	82.50%	
Registered electors		92,331		
INC(I) gain from INC		Swing		

=== 1972 ===
1972 Andhra Pradesh Legislative Assembly election: Tiruvuru (SC)
Party	Candidate	Votes	%	±%
INC	Kota Ramaiah	33,156	60.60%	
Independent	Bhimala Sanjeevi	21,556	39.40%	
Margin of victory		11,600	21.20%	
Turnout		55,059	69.52%	
Registered electors		80,489		
INC hold		Swing		

=== 1967 ===
1967 Andhra Pradesh Legislative Assembly election: Tiruvuru (SC)
Party	Candidate	Votes	%	±%
INC	V Kurmayya	26,225	47.48%	
CPI(M)	Bhimala Sanjeevi	15,782	28.58%	
Margin of victory		10,443	18.91%	
Turnout		56,603	78.57%	
Registered electors		72,0424		
INC hold		Swing		

=== 1962 ===
1962 Andhra Pradesh Legislative Assembly election: Tiruvuru
Party	Candidate	Votes	%	±%
INC	Peta Bapayya	26,608	51.48%	
CPI	Sunkara Veerabhadra Rao	23,487	45.44%	
Margin of victory		3,121	6.04%	
Turnout		53,010	83.80%	
Registered electors		63,259		
INC hold		Swing		

=== 1955 ===
1955 Andhra State Legislative Assembly election: Tiruvuru
Party	Candidate	Votes	%	±%
INC	Peta Bapayya	21,861	53.46%	
CPI	Peta Rama Rao	19,031	46.54%	
Margin of victory		2,830	6.92%	
Turnout		40,892	76.54%	
Registered electors		53,427		
INC gain from CPI		Swing		

=== 1952 ===
1952 Madras State Legislative Assembly election: Tiruvur
Party	Candidate	Votes	%	±%
CPI	Peta Rama Rao	34,957	57.76%	
INC	Peta Bappaiah	13,284	21.95%	21.95%
Independent	Raju Surmemi Venkataraju Gopal Narasimha Rao	12,281	20.29%	
Margin of victory		21,673	35.81%	
Turnout		60,522	76.81%	
Registered electors		78,794		
CPI win (new seat)				

== See also ==
- List of constituencies of the Andhra Pradesh Legislative Assembly
