= Mahmood Ali (Indian politician) =

Indian politician

Mohammed Mahmood Ali
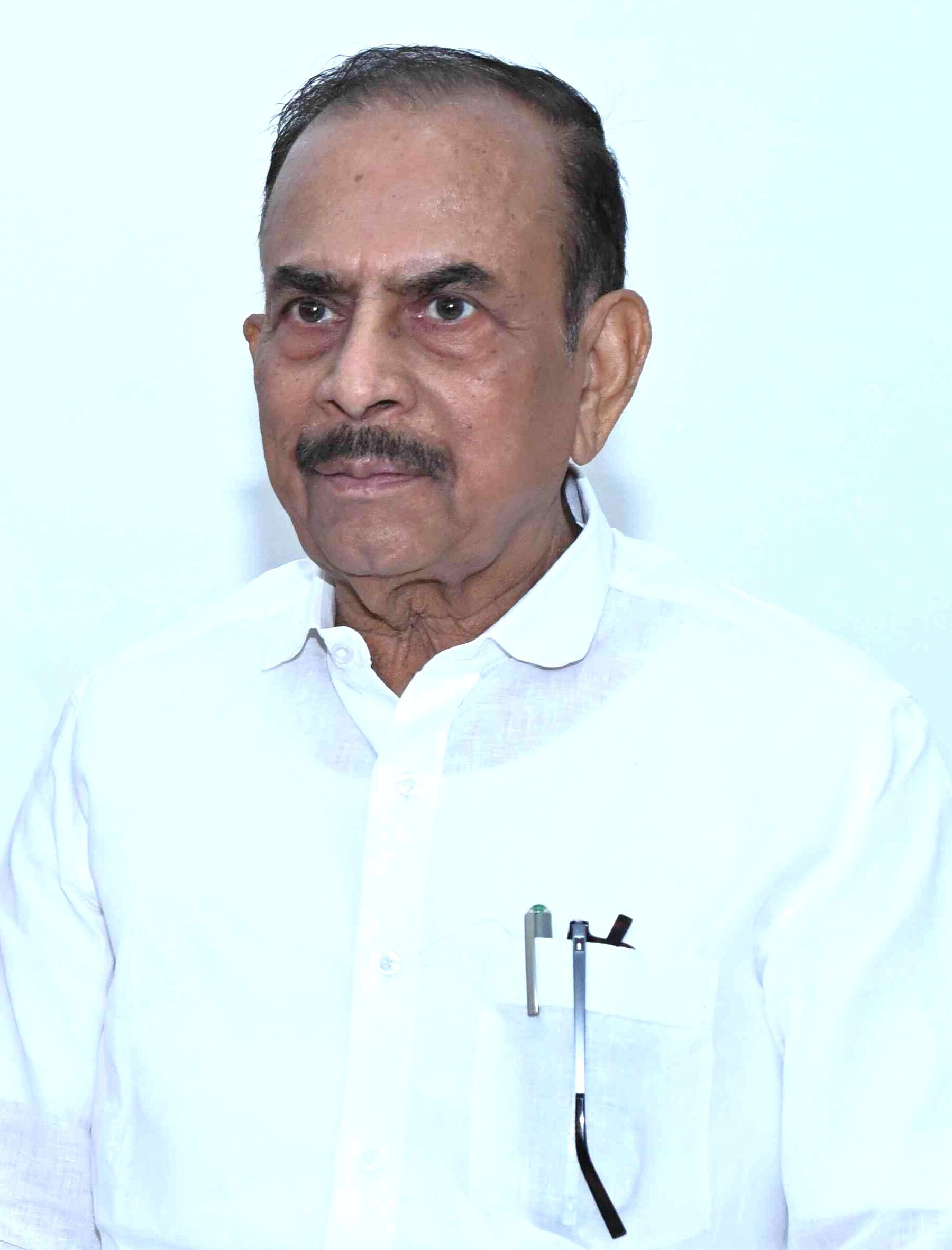
- Ali in 2025

Cabinet Minister, Government of Telangana
- In office 13 December 2018 – 4 December 2023
- Governor: E. S. L. Narasimhan; Tamilisai Soundararajan
- Chief Minister: K. Chandrashekar Rao
- Department and ministry: Home.; Prisons.; Fire Services
- Preceded by: Nayani Narasimha Reddy
- Succeeded by: Anumula Revanth Reddy

Deputy Chief Minister of Telangana
- In office 2 June 2014 – 6 September 2018 Serving with T. Rajaiah; Kadiyam Srihari
- Governor: E. S. L. Narasimhan
- Chief Minister: K. Chandrashekar Rao
- Preceded by: Position Established

Member of the Telangana Legislative Council
- Incumbent
- Assumed office 2010
- Constituency: Telangana

Personal details
- Born: 3 March 1952 (age 74) Hyderabad, Hyderabad State, India
- Party: Bharat Rashtra Samithi
- Spouse: Nasreen Fathima
- Children: One Son (Md Azam Ali) and Two Daughters
- Education: Osmania University

Mohammed Mahmood Ali (born 2 March 1952) is an Indian politician who was the Deputy Chief Minister of Telangana from 2014 until 2018. The departments of the State Home Ministry, Prisons and Fire Services were allocated to him during the 2nd K. Chandrasekhar Rao ministry, and he held them from 2018-2023. He is a member of Telangana Legislative Council.

== Early life ==
Ali was born in Hyderabad and lives in Azampura. He received his Bachelor's degree in Commerce from Osmania University. He later ventured in dairy farming business, in which he earned a lot of money.

== Political career ==
Ali was elected as a Member of Legislative Council of United Andhra Pradesh in 2010. He got into the Telangana movement in 2001 when K. Chandrashekar Rao launched the Telangana Rashtra Samithi now called the Bharat Rashtra Samithi (BRS), and is considered one of the founding members of the party. After the creation of Telangana, he became a representative of the Telangana Legislative Council. He is the president of the BRS party's minority cell.

He is a close aide to Chandrashekar Rao, and has been with him since the start of the Telangana agitation movement.

After the formation of Telangana and the subsequent elections, he was handed the departments of Revenue, Stamps and Registrations, Relief and Rehabilitation, Urban Land Ceiling. He managed the same from 2014–2018.

He was the second Home Minister of Telangana in the second K. Chandrashekar Rao ministry, replacing Nayani Narasimha Reddy. He also managed the departments of Prisons and Fire Services.

=== Deputy Chief Minister ===
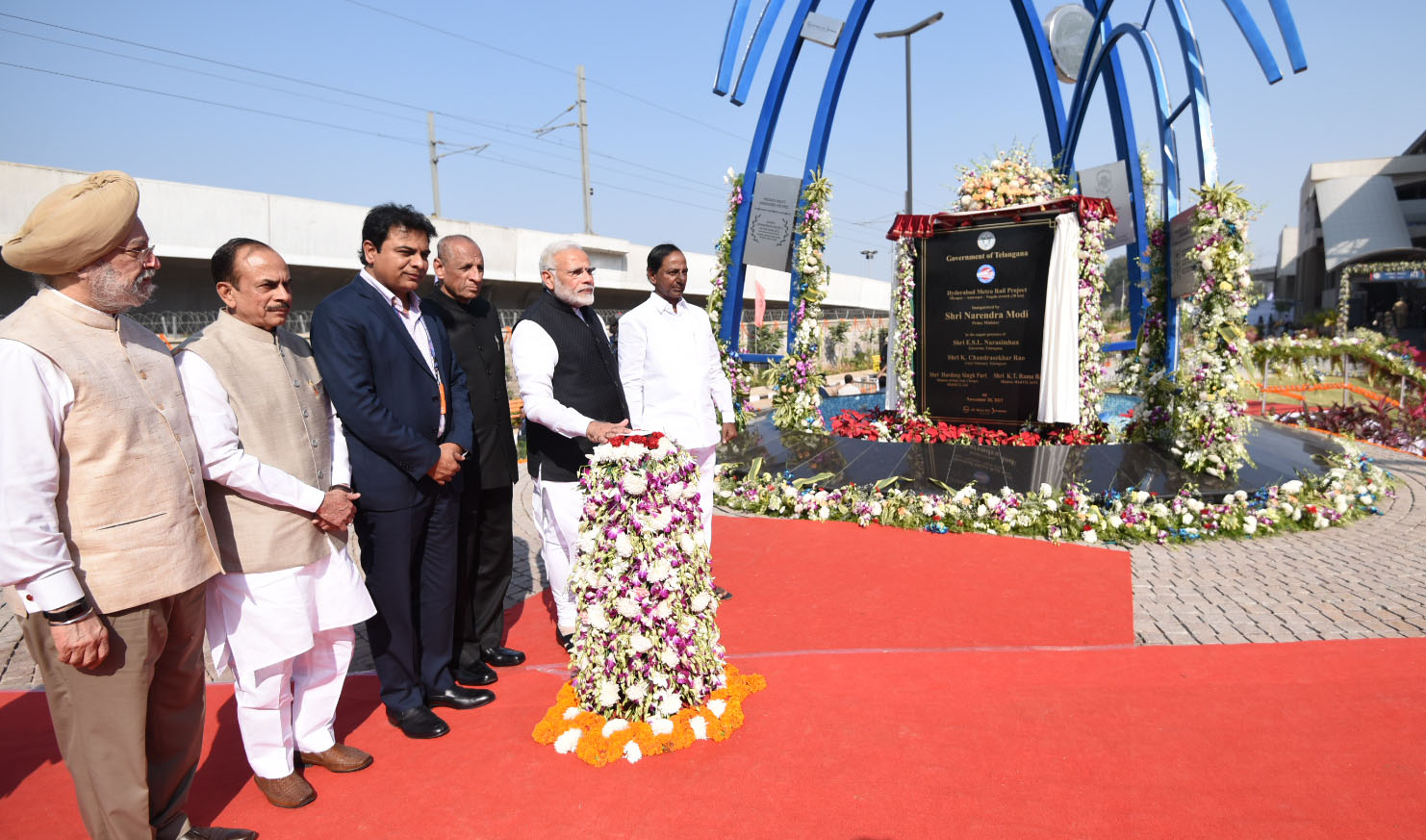
Mahmood Ali with Prime Minister Narendra Modi in 2017

On 2 June 2014, Ali was appointed the first ever Deputy Chief Minister of Telangana by Chief Minister K. Chandrasekhar Rao following the party victory in the state's Legislative Assembly election. He shared the post with T Rajaiah.

After the 2018 Telangana Legislative Assembly elections, he shared the post with Kadiyam Srihari.

== Personal life ==
He is married to Nasreen Fathima, and has a son and two daughters. Per his election affidavits, he owns a dairy farm, as well as a function hall named ‘Azam Function Hall’, both of which helped him earn a lot of money. In his 2018 election affidavits, Ali declared his movable assets at Rs 1.07 crore, a near 50% jump from his previous affidavit in 2013. His immovable assets also doubled as they stood at Rs 2.2 crore. His wife’s movable assets tripled. Ali has specified that his major source of “income” was through dairy farm, salary as deputy chief minister and “rental” from function hall.

During the 2024 Republic Day celebrations at the Telangana Bhavan in Banjara Hills, he fainted due to fatigue and was rushed to Apollo Hospital.

== Controversies ==
In 2022, when he was the Home Minister of Telangana, he made a statement saying women wearing short clothes could lead to problems.

In 2023, he slapped his personal security officer for not having a bouquet at hand, when Ali had stepped onto a stage to wish Minister for Animal Husbandry Talasani Srinivas Yadav on his birthday.
