= Koneru Ranga Rao =

Indian politician

5th Deputy Chief Minister of Andhra Pradesh
- In office 9 October 1992 – 12 December 1994
- Preceded by: C. Jagannatha Rao
- Succeeded by: Damodar Raja Narasimha
- Constituency: Tiruvuru

Personal details
- Born: 26 July 1936 Vijayawada, Madras Presidency, British Raj (now in Andhra Pradesh, India )
- Died: 15 March 2010 (aged 73) Hyderabad, Andhra Pradesh, India (now in Hyderabad, Telangana, India)
- Party: Indian National Congress
- Relatives: Mallu Ravi (Son in Law)

Koneru Ranga Rao (26 July 1936 – 15 March 2010) was an Indian politician. He belonged to Congress party. He was Deputy Chief Minister of Andhra Pradesh.

== Early life ==
Koneru Ranga Rao was a Dalit leader of Madiga community. He born at Gudavalli, Vijayawada. He did his BA.

== Political career ==
Koneru Ranga Rao was elected as sarpanch of his village Gundavalli and worked for 20 years in the village.

He was elected from Kanipadu constituency to the Andhra Pradesh Legislative Assembly and became Social welfare minister. He was also elected from Tiruviru constituency twice. He also served as Minister for Municipal Development, Endowments. He was the Deputy Chief Minister during the reign of Kotla Vijaya Bhaskara Reddy.

== Death ==
Koneru Ranga Rao died on 15 March 2010.

== Personal life ==
Koneru Ranga Rao was married and had four children. His son in law is an Ex. Member of Parliament, Mallu Ravi.
