= Chanti Kranthi Kiran =

Indian politician

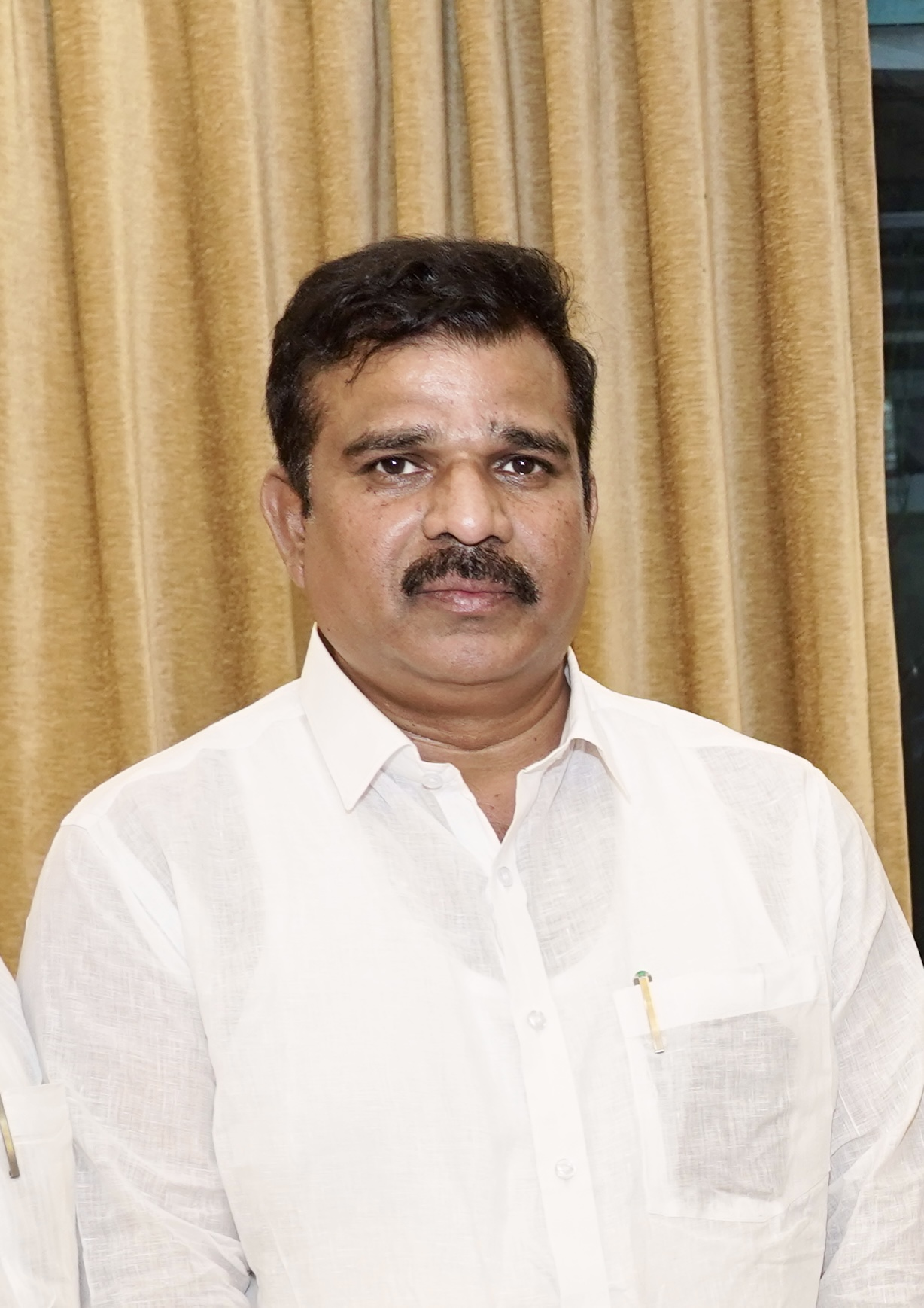

Member of Telangana Legislative Assembly
- In office 2018 – 2023 December 23
- Preceded by: Babu Mohan
- Succeeded by: Damodar Raja Narasimha
- Constituency: Andole

Personal details
- Born: 6 December 1976 (age 49) Pothulaboguda Village, Watpalle Mandal, Medak, Telangana, India
- Party: Bharat Rashtra Samithi
- Spouse: Padmavathi
- Children: 1
- Parent(s): Bhoomaiah & Komuramma
- Profession: Journalist & Politician

Chanti Kranthi Kiran is an Journalist and Indian politician from Telangana. He was elected as member of the Telangana Legislative Assembly from Andole Assembly constituency in Medak district in 2018 Telangana Assembly elections.

== Political career ==
Kranthi Kiran began his political career by contesting 2009 Andhra Pradesh Legislative Assembly elections as an independent candidate from Andole and lost, later he joined Bharat Rashtra Samithi, formerly known as Telangana Rashtra Samithi and was elected as ZPTC from Ramachandrapuram. He actively participated in the agitation of a separate State for Telangana under the banner Telangana Journalists Forum.

After the formation of Telangana in 2018 Telangana Legislative Assembly election he contested from Andole as TRS Candidate and won by a margin of 16,465 votes, defeating Indian National Congress candidate Damodar Raja Narasimha.

Kranthi Kiran contested the 2023 Telangana Legislative Assembly election from Andole as BRS Candidate and lost to Indian National Congress candidate Damodar Raja Narasimha by a margin of 28,193 votes.
