= Kolikapudi Srinivasa Rao =

Indian politician

Member of the Andhra Pradesh Legislative Assembly
- Incumbent
- Assumed office 4 June 2024
- Chief Minister: N. Chandrababu Naidu
- Preceded by: Kokkiligadda Rakshana Nidhi
- Constituency: Tiruvuru, NTR district

Personal details
- Born: 1968 (age 57–58) Tadikonda, Guntur district, Andhra Pradesh, India
- Party: TDP (2024 – present)
- Parent: Subba Rao (father)
- Occupation: Politician

Kolikapudi Srinivasa Rao (born 1969) is an Indian politician and current Member of the Legislative Assembly (MLA) for Tiruvuru Assembly constituency in the state of Andhra Pradesh. He is member of the Telugu Desam Party. He is a former convener for Amaravati Joint Action Committee.

== Electoral performance ==
S.No	Year	Election	Constituency	Party	Votes	Margin	Result
1	2024	MLA	Tiruvuru	TDP	89,118	+21,874	Won

== Controversies ==
=== Police complaint by Ram Gopal Varma ===
On 27 December 2023, filmmaker Ram Gopal Varma lodged an online and in-person complaint with the Andhra Pradesh police against Kolikapudi. This followed a live TV5 debate in which Kolikapudi allegedly offered a bounty of ₹1 crore for beheading the director over his upcoming film Vyooham. Varma also named the show’s anchor and the channel’s owner in his complaint, alleging they facilitated the remarks. In the same debate, Kolikapudi said Chiranjeevi and Pawan Kalyan’s fans “should not allow Varma to roam free anywhere” for his comments on their favourite stars. The police complaint was filed in Vijayawada.

=== Demolition row in Kambampadu ===
After becoming MLA, on 3 July 2024, Kolikapudi Srinivasa Rao was involved in a tense situation at Kambampadu village in A. Konduru mandal. Acting on complaints from local residents about alleged encroachment, he personally inspected a building under construction by YSRCP MPP (Mandal Praja Parishad President) Kalasani Nagalakshmi’s husband and directed its partial demolition, reportedly stating that he would remove the structure himself if officials failed to act. The action, carried out with the help of machinery and accompanied by supporters, led to traffic disruption on the Bhadrachalam National Highway and a standoff with police and officials, who later halted the demolition citing procedural requirements.
