= Andole =

- Town
- Interactive map of Andole
- Coordinates: 17°48′52″N 78°04′38″E
- Country: India
- State: Telangana
- District: Sangareddy

Languages
  - Official: Telugu
- Time zone: UTC+5:30 (IST)
- PIN: 502273
- Vehicle registration: TG15
- Nearest city: Hyderabad, India
- Lok Sabha constituency: Medak Lok Sabha constituency
- Vidhan Sabha constituency: Andole Assembly constituency
- Website: telangana.gov.in

Andole is a municipal town and constituency headquarters in Sangareddy district of Indian state of Telangana.
