= Manda Krishna Madiga =

Indian politician and dalit rights activist (born 1965)

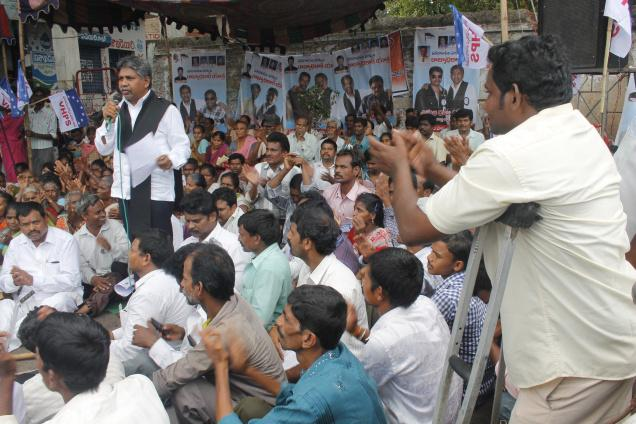
- Krishna Madiga addressing people
- Born: July 7, 1965 (age 61) kotha Shayampeta, Hanamkonda, Telangana, India
- Occupations: Social activist, politician
- Known for: Madiga Reservation Porata Samiti
- Political party: Mahajana Socialist Party (2014 - present)
- Movement: Madiga Dandora
- Spouse: Jyothi
- Children: 3
- Parent(s): Komuraiah (father), Komuramma (mother)

Signature
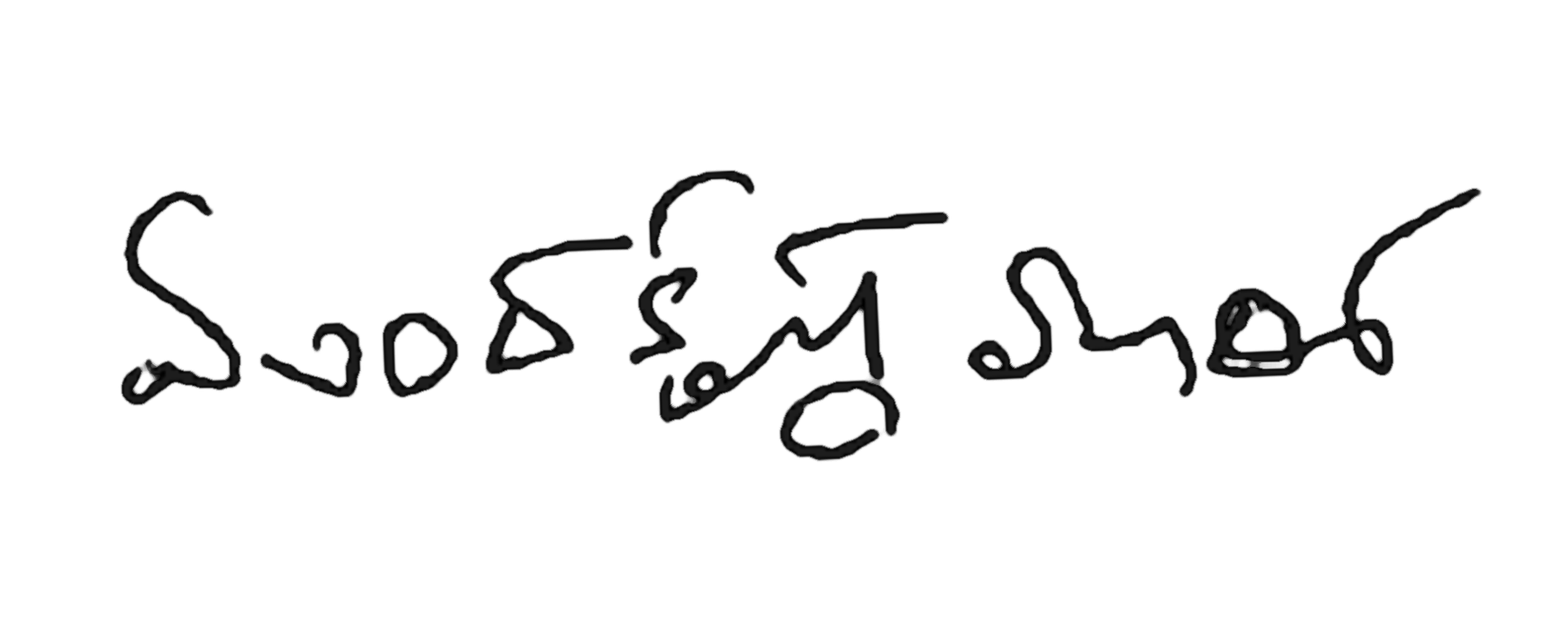

Manda Krishna Madiga, born as Yellaiah on July 7, 1965, is an Indian politician and activist for the rights of the marginalized Madiga community. He was an anti-caste activist in the 1980s and founded the Madiga Reservation Porata Samiti in 1994. His activities include issues of caste discrimination, children's health, and disability rights.

Manda Krishna Madiga received the Padma Shri in 2025 on the eve of the 76th Republic Day.

== Early life and activism ==
Manda Krishna Madiga began his journey as an anti-caste activist in the early 1980s in Warangal. He took action against dominant caste individuals who were mistreating lower castes. He received support from the People's War Group, a Naxalite faction, during this time. However, he later abandoned extremism to securing the rights of marginalized Dalit communities through legal means.

After parting ways with the Naxalites, Manda Krishna joined the broader Dalit movement, which gained strength after the Karamchedu (1985) and Tsunduru (1991) massacres.

== Madiga Dandora movement ==
In 1994, in Prakasam district, there was a movement to create sub-categories within the Scheduled Castes (SCs). This movement was led by Manda Krishna Madiga, who founded the Madiga Reservation Porata Samithi (MRPS) (transl. Madiga Reservation Action Committee). He was at the forefront of protests in the former Andhra Pradesh, advocating for fairness for other less-represented SC communities. Many progressive thinkers also supported this demand. In 2008, Krishna Madiga even went on a hunger strike to draw attention to the cause.

The term "Madiga" was previously used as an offensive term until Manda Krishna and other leaders adopted it as their surname to signify their assertion. The MRPS also elevated 'dandora'—the practice of announcing people using the dappu or traditional leather drum as a symbol of their movement advocating for the sub-classification of reservations. In many rural areas, the MRPS is commonly referred to as "Madiga Dandora".

== Advocacy for Children and the Handicapped ==
Manda Krishna Madiga played a significant role in advocating for children with cardiac problems in 2004. During that time, there was a girl named Naseem from Madhira in Khammam district who needed 1 lakh 40 thousand rupees for a heart operation. Naseem was of Muslim faith. Krishna Madiga sought assistance from then Chief Minister Y. S. Rajasekhar Reddy, who provided only 25 thousand rupees. When Krishna Madiga requested the remaining amount, YSR declined, urging Naseem to collect the rest independently. When further pressed, YSR expressed concern that granting this request would open the floodgates for similar demands and even made threats against Krishna Madiga if the matter persisted.

Subsequently, Krishna Madiga led a rally with children, emphasizing the importance of regular screening tests every six months to prevent treatment delays. He also called for the allocation of funds from the Chief Minister's Relief Fund specifically for this program. Madiga's actions contributed significantly to raising awareness about child heart diseases and the necessity of government involvement. As a result, in August 2004, 24 screening camps were established in the state, identifying 5,500 children with heart diseases. It to led to creation of Aarogyasri scheme which is the flagship scheme of all health initiatives of the state government to provide quality healthcare to the poor.

=== Fight for Disabled Rights ===
In 2007, Manda Krishna Madiga started an organization called Vikalangula Hakkula Porata Samiti (transl. Disabled Rights Action Committee) to fight for the rights of disabled people. They held a big event called 'Vikalangula Maha Garjana' at Nizam College grounds. Krishna Madiga pointed out that disabled people in Andhra Pradesh received only Rs 200 as a monthly pension, while it was Rs 400 in Tamil Nadu and much higher in Pondicherry. To make their demands known, Krishna Madiga and around 2,000 disabled individuals gathered at the Babu Jagjivan Ram statue in Basheerbagh for a protest.

In 2012, VHPS organized another protest called 'Vikalangula Poru Yatra' in Visakhapatnam. Manda Krishna Madiga participated in this protest and criticized the state government for not addressing the challenges faced by disabled people. He highlighted that there were 6 crore disabled people in the country, but not enough was being done to help them.

Manda Krishna Madiga had several demands, including reserving 5% of local bodies seats for disabled individuals, ensuring strict implementation of a 3% reservation for them in employment, increasing the pension for disabled individuals from Rs. 500 to Rs. 1,500, providing them with schemes and subsidies similar to those for Scheduled Castes (SCs) and Scheduled Tribes (STs), creating a special plan for disabled individuals, offering free housing, electricity, and transportation, giving priority to disabled individuals in land distribution, and increasing the special allowance for disabled employees from Rs. 900 to Rs. 1,500, among other things.

== Political career ==
Manda Krishna Madiga's political journey in United Andhra Pradesh and Telangana has been marked by several electoral attempts. In the 2004 elections, he contested independently for the Madhira Assembly constituency but secured 25,635 votes, ultimately losing the race. In 2009, he once again vied for the Madhira Assembly constituency, this time as a candidate of the Trilinga Praja Pragathi Party, but fell short with 21,779 votes. His aspirations continued in 2014 when he ran for the Wardhanapet Assembly constituency as a member of his own party, the Mahajana Socialist Party. However, despite his efforts, he received 20,425 votes and faced defeat once more. Manda Krishna Madiga's political career has been characterized by persistence, though electoral success has thus far remained elusive.
