= Kokkiligadda Rakshana Nidhi =

Indian politician

Member of Legislative Assembly, Andhra Pradesh
- In office 8 June 2019 – 4 June 2024
- Chief Minister: Y. S. Jagan Mohan Reddy
- Succeeded by: Kolikapudi Srinivasa Rao
- Constituency: Tiruvuru

Member of the Legislative Assembly, Andhra Pradesh
- In office 2014–2019
- Chief Minister: N. Chandrababu Naidu
- Preceded by: Dirisam Padma Jyothi
- Constituency: Tiruvuru

Personal details
- Born: 1964 (age 61–62) Vallurupalem, Thotlavalluru, Andhra Pradesh, India
- Party: YSR Congress Party (2014 – present)
- Spouse: Mariyamma
- Occupation: Politician

Kokkilagadda Rakshana Nidhi, born in 1964 in Vallurupalem, Thotlavalluru mandal, is a politician representing the state of Andhra Pradesh. He served two terms as the Member of the Legislative Assembly (MLA) for the Tiruvuru Assembly constituency in NTR district from 2014 to 2024. He is a member of the YSR Congress Party.
