= Munpalle =

Munpalli
- Village
- Country: India
- State: Telangana
- Sangareddy District: Sangareddy

Government
  - Type: Panchayati raj (India)
  - Body: Gram panchayat grama sarpanch karcharla Ramesh

Area
  - Total: 0.338 km^{2} (0.131 sq mi)

Population
  - Total: 6,000
  - Density: 18,000/km^{2} (46,000/sq mi)

Languages
  - Official: Telugu
- Time zone: UTC+5:30 (IST)
- Postal code: 502345
- Vehicle registration: TS015
- Vidhan Sabha constituency: Andole

Munpalli is a village and mandal in Sangareddy district of Telangana, India.

The villages in Munpalli mandal includes Antharam, Belur, Bhusareddipalle, Bodishetpalle, Bodpalle, Budhera, Chilepalle, Chinna Loni, Chinna Chelmeda, Garlapalle, Kamkole, Khammampalle, Lingampalle, Lonikalan, Lonikurdu, Makthakesaram, Mallikarjunpally, Mansanpalle, elasangam, Moqdumpalle, Munpalli, Pedda Chelmeda, Pedda Gopalaram, Pedda Loni, Polkampalle, Tatipalle, Thakkadpalle, Mallareddypeta, Allapur, Takkadapally, Hydlapur, and Ibrahimpur.
