= Utkoor =

Village in Telangana, India

- Mandal (Village)
- Utkoor (Telangana)
- Coordinates: 16.642700°N 77.487400°E
- Country: India
- State: Telangana
- District: Narayanpet
- Elevation: 410 m (1,350 ft)

Population
  - Total: 48,473
  - Density: 133/km^{2} (340/sq mi)

Languages
  - Official: Urdu Telugu
- Time zone: UTC+5:30 (IST)
- Telephone code: 08506-286127 (MDO)
- Vehicle registration: TS 38
- Climate: hot (Köppen)

Utkur or Utkoor is a Mandal (administrative unit) in Narayanpet district, Telangana.

== Geography ==
Utkur is located at 16.6500°N 78.5167°E. It has an average elevation of 396 metres (1302 ft). Utkoor is one of the 64 Mandals (Tehsil) in Mahboobnagar located about 60 km towards west from the District headquarters District bordering Karnataka state. Utkoor has 8,879 Households spread across total 33 villages and 18 panchayats. The nearest town to Utkoor is Narayanpet about 15 km away with good road connectivity. There is no railway station within 10 km and the nearest big town is Narayanpet which is 15 kilometers away. The Hyderabad to Raichur highway runs through Utkoor Mandal.

== Education Institutions ==
Utkoor has Zilla Parishad government primary and high school and there is a Govt junior college. MPHS is a Telugu medium co-education high school in Pedddajatram in Utkoor Mandal. Dayanand Vidya Mandir Primary School is run by the Arya Samaj society of Utkoor. There are two private English medium schools Nalanda High School and Milat-e-Islamia High School in Utkoor.

== Villages ==
The villages in Utkoor mandal include:

- Aminpur
- Auslonipalle war
- Chinnaporla
- Edivelly
- Kollur
- Magdampoor
- Mallepalle
- Nidugurthi
- Oblapur
- Pagidimarri
- Pathapalle
- Peddajatram
- Peddaporla
- Pulmamidi
- Thipraspalle
- Utkoor
- Vallampalle
