= Pulkal =

- Mandal
- Location in Telangana, India Pulkal (India)
- Coordinates: 17.740191°N 77.987236°E
- Country: India
- State: telangana
- District: Medak

Languages
  - Official: Telugu
- Time zone: UTC+5:30 (IST)
- Vehicle registration: TS 23
- Website: telangana.gov.in

Pulkal is a Mandal in Sangareddy District of Telangana, India.
