= Malyala Rajaiah =

Indian politician

Member of the Legislative Assembly
- In office 1985–1989
- Constituency: Andhol

Cabinet minister, Finance and Power, Andhra Pradesh
- In office February 1989 – November 1989

Member of the Legislative Assembly
- In office 1994–1998
- Constituency: Andhol

Cabinet minister, Housing, Andhra Pradesh
- In office 1996–1998

Member of Parliament, 12th Lok Sabha
- In office 1998–1999
- Constituency: Siddipet

Member of Parliament, 13th Lok Sabha
- In office 1999–2004
- Constituency: Siddipet

Personal details
- Born: 25 February 1944 Vedira, Karimnagar, Andhra Pradesh
- Died: 15 October 2018 (aged 74) Warasiguda
- Party: Telugu Desam Party
- Spouse: M. Anasuya Devi
- Children: 4

Malyala Rajaiah (25 February 1944 - 15 October 2018) was an Indian politician and the Member of parliament who represented Siddipet parliamentary constituency from 1998 to 2004, and served as the member of legislative assembly for Andhol constituency in 1985 which only ended in 1998 until he contested 12th Lok Sabha and 13th General elections of India.

== Life and background ==
Malyala Rajaiah was born on 25 February 1944 in Vedira village of Karimnagar, Telangana. He did Bachelor of Arts in Hyderabad from a college and Bachelor of Laws at Osmania University, Hyderabad. He started practising as an Advocate in Secunderabad city civil court.

== Career ==
Prior to his political engagement, he was serving as a Judge in state of Andhra Pradesh from 1979 to 1985. He practiced as an Advocate from 1975 to 1979.Before that, he had also worked in South central Railways for 8 years. In 1985, he contested assembly election and assumed office as a Member of the Legislative Assembly. He was appointed as a Chairman of Estimates legislative committee which he has served for 4 years, until 1989, and as a Finance and Power minister from February to November in N.T.Rama Rao’s Cabinet. In 1994, he was re-elected for the assembly and was appointed as a chairman of SC legislative committee. He was appointed as a Member of TTD( Thirupati Thirumala Devasthanam) board in 1994. In 1996, when he was serving as MLA, he was credited with state Housing ministry until 1998. It was 1998 when he contested 12th General elections of India from Siddipet constituency and served as a member of parliament until 1999. He was then re-elected in 13th Lok Sabha elections with highest majority in the State and remained in office till 2004. During this period, he was the member of parliamentary committee on Defence, Industries and parliamentary committee on SC’s and ST’s.

== Personal life ==
Malyala Rajaiah was born to Malyala Mallaiah and Durgamma on 25 February 1944. He was married at a very young age to "M. Anasuya Devi" on 23 May 1964. He had two sons, Srinivas and Ravinder, and two daughters Sharada and Saroja.
