= Makthal Assembly constituency =

Constituency of the Telangana legislative assembly in India

Coordinates: 16.50°N 77.51°E

Makthal
- Constituency No. 77 for the Telangana Legislative Assembly
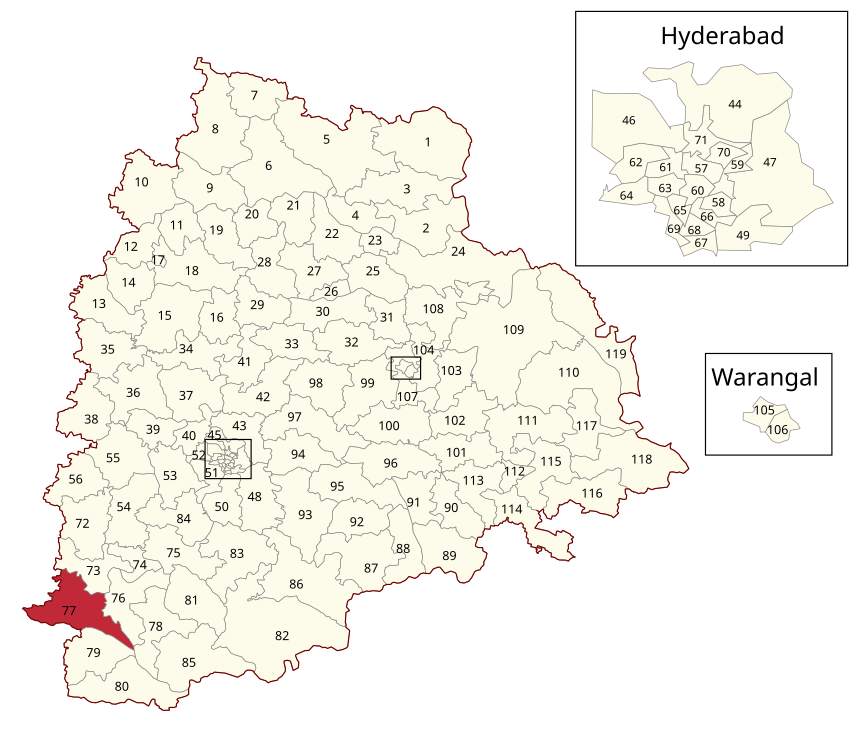
- Location of Makthal Assembly constituency within Telangana

Constituency details
- Country: India
- Region: South India
- State: Telangana
- District: Narayanpet
- Lok Sabha constituency: Mahabubnagar
- Established: 1951
- Total electors: 2,42,431
- Reservation: None

Member of Legislative Assembly
- 3rd Telangana Legislative Assembly
- Incumbent Vakiti Srihari
- Party: Indian National Congress
- Elected year: 2023

Makthal Assembly constituency is a constituency of Telangana Legislative Assembly, India. It is Part of Narayanpet district. It is part of Mahabubnagar Lok Sabha constituency.

Vakiti Srihari of Indian National Congress won the 2023 Telangana Legislative Assembly election.

== Mandals ==
The Assembly Constituency presently comprises the following Mandals:

Mandal	Districts
Makthal	Narayanpet
Maganoor	Narayanpet
Atmakur	Wanaparthy
Amarchinta	Wanaparthy
Narva	Narayanpet
Utkoor	Narayanpet
Krishna	Narayanpet

== Members of Legislative Assembly ==
Duration	Member	Political party
1957	Bannappa	Independent politician
1962	Kalyani Ramchander Rao	Indian National Congress
1967	Kalyani Ramchander Rao	Indian National Congress
1972	Kalyani Ramchander Rao	Indian National Congress
1978	G Narasimhulu Naidu	Indian National Congress
1983	G Narasimhulu Naidu	Indian National Congress
1985	Chittem Narsi Reddy	Janata Party
1989	Chittem Narsi Reddy	Janata Dal
1994	Yelkoti Yella Reddy	Telugu Desam Party
1999	Yelkoti Yella Reddy	Telugu Desam Party
2004	Chittem Narsi Reddy	Indian National Congress
2009	Kothakota Dayakar Reddy	Telugu Desam Party
2014	Chittem Rammohan Reddy	Indian National Congress
2018	Chittem Rammohan Reddy	Telangana Rashtra Samithi
2023	Vakiti Srihari	Indian National Congress

== Election results ==
=== Telangana Legislative Assembly election, 2023 ===
Telangana Assembly Elections, 2023: Makthal
Party	Candidate	Votes	%	±%
INC	Vakiti Srihari	74,917	39.88	
BRS	Chittem Ram Mohan Reddy	57,392	30.55	
BJP	Jalandhar Reddy Madi Reddy	45,455	24.20	
BSP	Jagannath Reddy Varkatam	2,454	1.31	
NOTA	None of the Above	1,896	1.01	
Majority		17,525	9.33	
Turnout		1,87,834		
INC gain from BRS		Swing		

=== Telangana Legislative Assembly election, 2018 ===
2018 Telangana Legislative Assembly election: Makthal
Party	Candidate	Votes	%	±%
TRS	Chittem Ram Mohan Reddy	78,538	47.77%	
Independent	Jalandhar Reddy Madi Reddy	31,258	18.40%	
TDP	Kothakota Dhayakar Reddy	26,448	16.09%	
BJP	Kondaiah	20,131	12.24%	
NOTA	None of the Above	2,101	1.28%	
Majority		26,906		
Turnout		1,64,402	77.77%	
TRS gain from INC		Swing		

=== Telangana Legislative Assembly election, 2014 ===
2014 Telangana Legislative Assembly election: Makthal
Party	Candidate	Votes	%	±%
INC	Chittem Ram Mohan Reddy	51,632	36.45%	
TRS	Yelkoti Yella Reddy	41,605	29.38%	
TDP	Kothakota Dhayakar Reddy	35,235	24.88%	
Majority		10,027		
Turnout		1,41,633	68.94%	
INC gain from TDP		Swing		

Note: Chittem Ram Mohan Reddy joined TRS from INC.

== See also ==
- List of constituencies of Telangana Legislative Assembly
