= Madiga Reservation Porata Samiti =

Indian not-for profit organisation

Madiga Reservation Porata Samiti or MRPS is a not-for profit organisation formed to demand the categorisation of the SC reservation quota in Andhra Pradesh and states of India to ensure equitable distribution of state allocations for all the constituent Dalit castes, including the Madiga. It was formed under the leadership of Manda Krishna Madiga and Pilli Manikya Rao in 1994. Manda Krishna Madiga is currently heading MRPS . On 2 August, the Supreme Court of India, upheld the sub-categorisation of Scheduled Castes, a key demand of MRPS.
