= List of deputy chief ministers of Telangana =

Deputy Leader of the executive of the Government of Telangana

Deputy Chief Minister of Telangana
- Telaṅgāṇa Upa Mukhya Mantrī
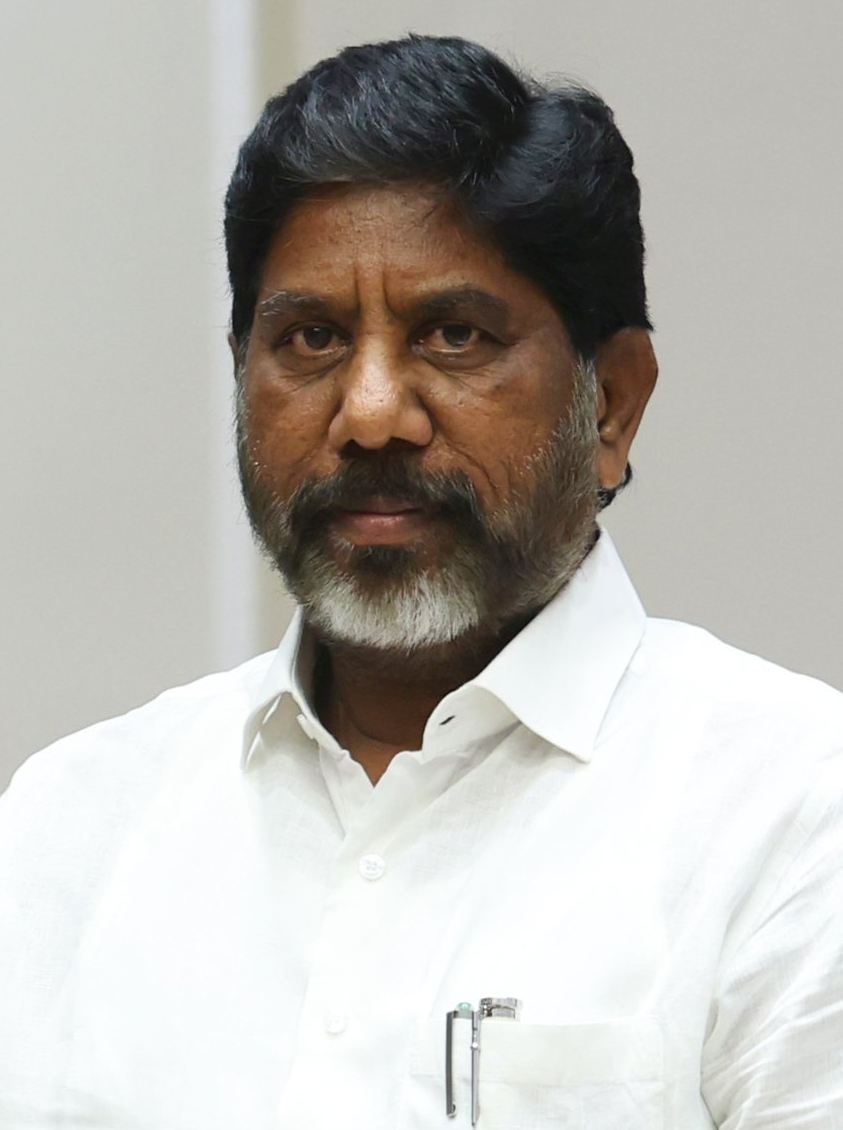
- Incumbent; Mallu Bhatti Vikramarka since 7 December 2023
- Deputy Chief Minister's Office (Government of Telangana)
- Style: The Honourable (Formal); Mr./Mrs. Deputy Chief Minister (Informal)
- Status: Deputy head of government
- Abbreviation: DCM of TG
- Member of: Telangana Legislature; Telangana Council of Ministers
- Reports to: Governor of Telangana; Chief Minister of Telangana; Telangana Legislature
- Seat: Praja Bhavan, Hyderabad
- Nominator: Chief Minister of Telangana
- Appointer: Governor of Telangana
- Term length: Five years and subject to no term limit; At the confidence of the Legislative Assembly
- Precursor: Deputy Chief Minister of Andhra Pradesh
- Inaugural holder: Mahmood Ali; Tatikonda Rajaiah
- Formation: 2 June 2014; 12 years ago
- Website: www.telangana.gov.in

The deputy chief minister of Telangana is the deputy to the chief minister of Telangana, who is head of the government of Telangana. The deputy chief minister is the second highest ranking member of the Telangana Council of Ministers. A deputy chief minister also holds a cabinet portfolio in the state ministry. In the legislative assembly system of government, the chief minister is treated as the "first among equals" in the cabinet; the position of deputy chief minister is used to govern the state with the support of a single party member or to bring political stability and strength within a coalition government, or in times of state emergency, when a proper chain of command is necessary. On multiple occasions, proposals have arisen to make the post permanent, but without result. The position of deputy chief minister is not explicitly defined or mentioned in the Constitution of India. However, the Supreme Court of India has stated that the appointment of deputy chief ministers is not unconstitutional. The court has clarified that a deputy chief minister, for all practical purposes, remains a minister in the council of ministers headed by the chief minister and does not draw a higher salary or perks compared to other ministers.During the absence of the chief minister, the deputy-chief minister may chair cabinet meetings and lead the assembly majority. Various deputy chief ministers have also taken the oath of secrecy in line with the one that chief minister takes. This oath has also sparked controversies.

The first deputy chief minister of Telangana was Mahmood Ali, who was also Minister of Revenue, Relief & Rehabilitation, ULC, Stamps & Registration in Chandrashekar Rao's first ministry. The second deputy chief minister was T. Rajaiah, who took on the role in addition to his health ministership in K. Chandrashekar Rao's government. On 25 January 2015, the chief minister K. Chandrashekar Rao dismissed Rajaiah in the wake of serious charges of corruption in his department and soon that day position of Rajaiah was replaced by Kadiyam Srihari and he became the third deputy chief minister of the state.

The current deputy chief minister is Mallu Bhatti Vikramarka. He assumed the office on 7 December 2023.

== List of Deputy chief ministers ==
No.	Portrait	Name	Elected Constituency	Political Party (Note: This column only names the deputy chief minister's party. The state government he heads with chief minister may be a complex coalition of several parties and independents; these are not listed here.)	Term of office			Chief Minister	Governor
1		T. Rajaiah	Ghanpur Station	Telangana Rashtra Samithi	2 June 2014	25 January 2015	237 days	K. Chandrashekar Rao	E. S. L. Narasimhan
2		M. Mahmood Ali	Member of the Legislative Council	Telangana Rashtra Samithi	2 June 2014	12 December 2018	4 years, 193 days	K. Chandrashekar Rao	E. S. L. Narasimhan
3		Kadiyam Srihari	Member of the Legislative Council	Telangana Rashtra Samithi	25 January 2015	12 December 2018	3 years, 321 days	K. Chandrashekar Rao	E. S. L. Narasimhan
Vacant (13 December 2018 – 6 December 2023)
4		Mallu Bhatti Vikramarka	Madhira	Indian National Congress	7 December 2023	Incumbent	2 years, 348 days	Anumula Revanth Reddy	(Note: Tamilisai Soundararajan (7 December 2023 – 18 March 2024); C. P. Radhakrishnan (20 March 2024 – 30 July 2024); Jishnu Dev Varma (31 July 2024 – 10 March 2026); Shiv Pratap Shukla (11 March 2026 – Incumbent))

== Statistics ==
List of deputy chief ministers by length of term

#	Deputy Chief Minister	Party	Term of office	
#	Deputy Chief Minister	Party	Longest continuous term	Total duration of deputy chief ministership
1	M. Mohamood Ali	TRS	4 years, 193 days	4 years, 193 days
2	Kadiyam Srihari	TRS	3 years, 321 days	3 years, 321 days
3	Mallu Bhatti Vikramarka	INC	2 years, 348 days	2 years, 348 days
4	T. Rajaiah	TRS	237 days	237 days

Timeline

List by party

Political parties by total time-span of their member holding Deputy CMO (20 November 2026)
No.	Political party	Number of Deputy chief ministers	Total days of holding Deputy CMO
1	Bharat Rashtra Samithi	3	1654 days
2	Indian National Congress	1	1079 days

Parties by total duration (in days) of holding Deputy Chief Minister's Office

- BRS
- INC

== See also ==
- History of Telangana
- Elections in Telangana
- List of governors of Telangana
- Chief Secretariat of Telangana
- Telangana Legislative Assembly
- List of chief ministers of Telangana
- List of chief ministers of Andhra Pradesh
- List of current Indian deputy chief ministers
- List of deputy chief ministers of Andhra Pradesh

== Oath as the state deputy chief minister ==
The deputy chief minister serves five years in the office. The following is the oath of the Deputy chief minister of state:

I, <Name of Deputy Chief Minister>, do swear in the name of God/solemnly affirm that I will bear true faith and allegiance to the Constitution of India as by law established, that I will uphold the sovereignty and integrity of India, that I will faithfully and conscientiously discharge my duties as a Minister for the State of () and that I will do right to all manner of people in accordance with the Constitution and the law without fear or favour, affection or ill-will.

Oath of Secrecy

"I, [Name], do swear in the name of God / solemnly affirm that I will not directly or indirectly communicate or reveal to any person or persons any matter which shall be brought under my consideration or shall become known to me as a Minister for the State of [Name of State] except as may be required for the due discharge of my duties as such Minister.[Naa Peru] ane nenu, shasanam dvara nirmithamaina Bharatadesha Athmabhandhavya, Sarvabhoumadhikara mariyu Samagrathanu kapadathanu ani... (or: ...Bharata Rajyanganam patla nijanmaina vishwasam, vidheyatha kaligi untanu ani), [Andhra Pradesh / Telangana] Rashtra Mukhya Mantriga naa kartavyalanu shraddha thonu, anthahkarana shuddhi thonu nirvahisthanu ani... Bhayam gani, pakshapatam gani, raagadweshalu gani lekunda... Rajyanganam mariyu shasanalaku luyabadi, prajalandarki nyayam chesthanu ani... Devuni perita pramanam chesthunnanu / Atmasakshiga pramanam chesthunnanu.""[Naa Peru] ane nenu, [Andhra Pradesh / Telangana] Rashtra Mukhya Mantriga naa pariseelana loki vachina, leda naku thilina ey vishayannina... Oka Mukhya Mantriga naa kartavya nirvahanaku avasaramaina sangathullo thappa... prathyakshanga gani, parokshanga gani, ey vyakthiki leda vyakthulaku thelipe prasakthi ledu ani... Devuni perita pramanam chesthunnanu / Atmasakshiga pramanam chesthunnanu."
