= Sammakka Sagar Barrage =

- Sammakka Sagar Barrage at Thupakulagudem Sammakka Sagar Barrage (India)
- Official name: Sammakka Sagar Barrage
- Country: India
- Location: Thupakulagudem village, Eturnagaram mandal, Mulugu district, Telangana
- Coordinates: 18°35′10″N 80°23′36″E
- Purpose: Multi-purpose
- Status: Under construction
- Construction began: February 2017
- Opening date: June 2021 (Signifies date of water impounding, not yet formally inaugurated)
- Construction cost: 2,121 Crores
- Built by: Rithwik Projects Private Limited
- Owner: Government of Telangana
- Operators: Irrigation & CAD Department, Government of Telangana

Dam and spillways
- Type of dam: Barrage
- Impounds: Godavari River
- Height: 83 m (272 ft)
- Length: 1,132 m (3,714 ft)
- Spillways: 48 (Radial lift gates)
- Spillway capacity: 8,50,000 Cusecs

Reservoir
- Creates: Sammakka Sagar
- Total capacity: 6.94 TMC

Sammakka Sagar Hydro Electric Project
- Operator: Telangana Power Generation Corporation (TGGENCO)
- Commission date: Proposed
- Type: Run-of-the-river
- Turbines: 10 Units of 24MW
- Installed capacity: 240 MW
- Annual generation: 786 MU (at 50% dependability) or 317 MU (at 90% dependability)

Sammakka Sagar Barrage (or Thupakulagudem Barrage) is a barrage across Godavari River at Thupakulagudem Village, Eturnagaram Mandal, Mulugu District of Telangana State. It stabilizes the existing irrigated area of 2,51,310 Hectare under J. Chokka Rao Devadula Lift Irrigation Scheme and 3,04,000 hectares of Sriram Sagar Project stages I & II with 50 TMC of water. Another 50 TMC will be used for providing drinking water to villages en route.

Sammakka Sagar Hydro Electric Project has been planned for generation of 240MW (10 units of 24MW) through run-of-the-river generation. This hydro electric project is expected to be completed by Telangana Power Generation Corporation (TGGENCO).

== History ==
This barrage was earlier referred to as Kanthanapally Barrage and it was proposed at 17 km downstream of the existing J. Chokka Rao Devadula Lift Irrigation pump house with Full Reservoir Level (FRL) at +85.0 meters. The barrage would've been constructed at narrow gorge on Godavari river at Kanthanapally village (18°27′40.22″N 80°24′35.24″E) but this would've led to submergence of about 4 villages fully and 11 villages partially. Potential land acquisition hurdles were also expected, as this would require acquisition of 7789.42 hectares of land. This barrage was earlier part of P V Narasimha Rao Kanthanapally Sujala Sravathi Project (PVNRKSSP).

In 2016, in order to avoid issues related to submergence and land acquisition, Government of Telangana decided to construct Thupakulagudem Barrage at the present location, which is 3 km downstream of the existing J. Chokka Rao Devadula Lift Irrigation pump house with FRL of +77.0 meters. At this location, there is no large land submergence with only river bed of 580.18 hectares and 94 hectares of surrounding land will get submerged. This would provide pondage for drawing the water for J. Chokka Rao Devadula Lift Irrigation scheme.

On February 13, 2020, Thupakulagudem Barrage was officially renamed as Sammakka Barrage, after tribal warrior goddess Sammakka. The boundary of Eturnagaram Wildlife Sanctuary is located at the close proximity from this barrage, where biennial festival of Sammakka Saralamma Jatara is held honour the Hindu tribal goddesses Sammakka.

In Spring 2021, the civil works of the barrage were mostly completed and subsequently in June, 2021 the process of impounding water into barrage commenced. At an FRL of +85 meters, 6.94 TMC of water is expected to be stored whereas, at reservoir level of 70 to 71 meters 2.90 TMC of water is expected to be stored. J. Chokka Rao Devadula Lift Irrigation Project uses water from 71 meters.

The works pertaining to Sammakka Hydro Electric Project are yet to be started by Telangana State Power Generation Corporation Limited and only civil works pertaining to the intake penstock gates has been reported to completed.
