= Mulug (disambiguation) =

Mulug or Mulugu is a city in Telangana, India.

Mulug or Mulugu may also refer to:

- Mulugu district, of which Mulugu is the district headquarters
- Mulug, Siddipet district, a town in Siddipet district
- Mulug (ST) (Assembly constituency)
