= Mulug Assembly constituency =

Constituency of the Telangana legislative assembly in India

Coordinates: 18.19°N 79.94°E

Mulug
- Constituency No. 109 for the Telangana Legislative Assembly
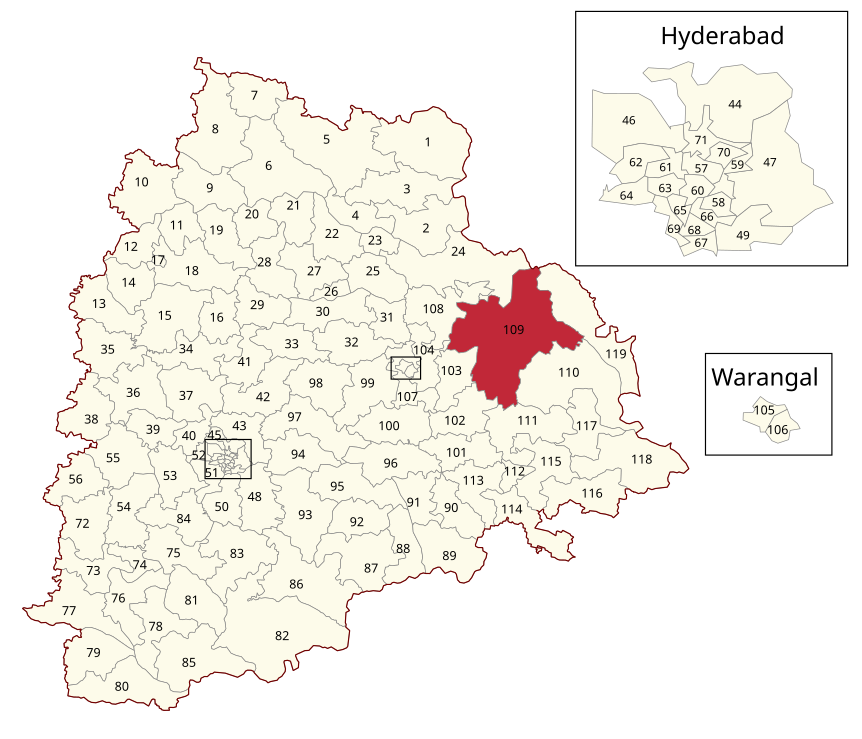
- Location of Mulug Assembly constituency within Telangana

Constituency details
- Country: India
- Region: South India
- State: Telangana
- District: Mulugu
- Lok Sabha constituency: Mahabubabad
- Established: 1951
- Total electors: 1,92,765
- Reservation: ST

Member of Legislative Assembly
- 3rd Telangana Legislative Assembly
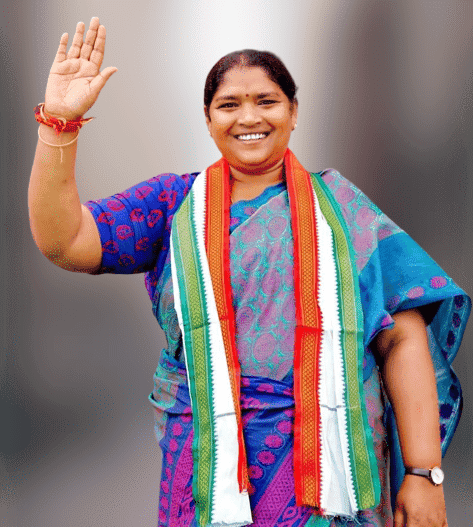
- Incumbent Dansari Anasuya (Seethakka)
- Party: Indian National Congress
- Elected year: 2023

Mulug Assembly constituency is an ST reserved constituency of the Telangana Legislative Assembly. It is part of Mahabubabad Lok Sabha constituency.

It is the largest constituency in the state in terms of land size, characterized by its extensive forest cover and rural population, approximately 3,819 square kilometres. It has the highest share of rural population in the state, with approximately 96% of its residents living in rural areas.

Dansari Anasuya (Seethakka) of Indian National Congress is currently representing the constituency. Azmeera Chandulal, former Minister of Tourism and Tribal Welfare of Telangana, represented the constituency from 2014 to 2018.

== Mandals ==
The assembly constituency presently comprises the following mandals:

Mandal	District
Mulug	Mulugu
Venkatapur	Mulugu
Govindaraopet	Mulugu
Tadvai	Mulugu
Eturnagaram	Mulugu
Mangapet	Mulugu
Mulug	Mulugu
Kothaguda	Mahabubabad district
Gangaram (Mahabubabad District)	Mahabubabad district

== Members of the Legislative Assembly ==
Year	Name	Party
Hyderabad
1952	G. Hanumanth Rao	People's Democratic Front
United Andhra Pradesh
1957	S. Rajeswar Rao	People's Democratic Front
1962	Musinepalli Krishnaiah	Indian National Congress
1967	Santosh Chakravarthy	Independent politician
1972	Santosh Chakravarthy	Indian National Congress
1978	Porika Jagan Naik	Indian National Congress
1983	Porika Jagan Naik	Indian National Congress
1985	Azmeera Chandulal	Telugu Desam Party
1989	Porika Jagan Naik	Indian National Congress
1994	Azmeera Chandulal	Telugu Desam Party
1996★	Cherpa Bhojarao	Telugu Desam Party
1999	Podem Veeraiah	Indian National Congress
2004	Podem Veeraiah	Indian National Congress
2009	Dansari Anasuya (Seethakka)	Telugu Desam Party
Telangana Legislative Assembly
2014	Azmeera Chandulal	Telangana Rashtra Samithi
2018	Dansari Anasuya (Seethakka)	Indian National Congress
2023	Dansari Anasuya (Seethakka)	Indian National Congress

★by-election

== Election results ==
=== Telangana Legislative Assembly election, 2023 ===
Telangana Assembly Elections, 2023: Mulug
Party	Candidate	Votes	%	±%
INC	Anasuya Dansari (Seetakka)	102,267	54.52	
BRS	Bade Nagajyothi	68,567	36.55	
BJP	Azmeera Prahlad Naik	5,388	2.87	
CPI(M-L)	Sammakka Vajja	1,538	1.02	
Independent	Maddila Venkateshwarlu	3,709	1.98	
Independent	Bangari Naresh	483	0.002	
Gondwana Dandkaranya Party	Vajja Jyothi Basu	190	0.0001	
BSP	Bhukya Jampanna	1,347	1.05	
NOTA	None of the Above	1,937	1.03	
Majority		33,700	17.97	
Turnout		1,87,583		
INC hold		Swing		

=== Telangana Legislative Assembly election, 2018 ===
2018 Telangana Legislative Assembly election: Mulug
Party	Candidate	Votes	%	±%
INC	Anasuya Dansari (Seetakka)	88,971	52.71	
TRS	Azmeera Chandulal	66,300	39.28	
Independent	Borra Laxminarayana	3,348	1.98	
NOTA	None of the Above	3,249	1.92	
Majority		22,671	13.43	
Turnout		1,68,780	82.75	
INC gain from TRS		Swing		

=== Telangana Legislative Assembly election, 2014 ===
2014 Telangana Legislative Assembly election: Mulug
Party	Candidate	Votes	%	±%
TRS	Azmeera Chandulal	58,325	38.16	
INC	Podem Veeraiah	41,926	27.43	
TDP	Anasuya Dansari (Seetakka)	39,441	25.81	
CPI(M)	Digini Sammaiah	2,415	1.58	
YSRCP	Lokini Sampath	2,214	1.45	
NOTA	None of the above	1,882	1.23	
Majority		16,399	10.73	
Turnout		1,52,834	77.81	
TRS gain from TDP		Swing		

=== Andhra Pradesh Legislative Assembly election, 2009 ===
2009 Andhra Pradesh Legislative Assembly election: Mulug
Party	Candidate	Votes	%	±%
TDP	Anasuya Dansari (Seetakka)	64,285	47.73	
INC	Podem Veeraiah	45,510	33.79	
PRP	K Jayaram	10,471	7.78	
BJP	Ajmira Krishnaveni	3,714	2.76	
Majority		18,775	13.94	
Turnout		1,34,674	76.03	
TDP gain from INC		Swing		

=== Andhra Pradesh Legislative Assembly election, 2004 ===
2004 Andhra Pradesh Legislative Assembly election: Mulug
Party	Candidate	Votes	%	±%
INC	Podem Veeraiah	55,687	47.05%	
TDP	Anasuya Dansari (Seetakka)	41,107	34.72%	
Others	Porika Jagan Naik	11,216	9.47%	
Others	Others	10,359	8.75%	
Majority		14,594		
Turnout		1,18,383	%%	
INC gain from TDP		Swing		

=== Andhra Pradesh Legislative Assembly election, 1999 ===
1999 Andhra Pradesh Legislative Assembly election: Mulug
Party	Candidate	Votes	%	±%
INC	Podem Veeraiah	60,166	54.03%	
TDP	Azmeera Chandulal	45,611	40.96%	
Others	Others	5,589	5.02%	
Majority		14,555		
Turnout		1,11,366	71.19%	
INC gain from TDP		Swing		

== See also ==
- List of constituencies of Telangana Legislative Assembly
