= Eturnagaram Wildlife Sanctuary =

Wildlife sanctuary in Telangana, India

- IUCN category IV (habitat/species management area)
- Location within Telangana Location within India
- Interactive map of Eturnagaram Wildlife Sanctuary
- Location: Telangana, India
- Nearest city: Mulugu
- Coordinates: 18.341°N 80.33°E
- Area: 812 km^{2} (314 sq mi)
- Established: 1952
- Governing body: Telangana Forest Department

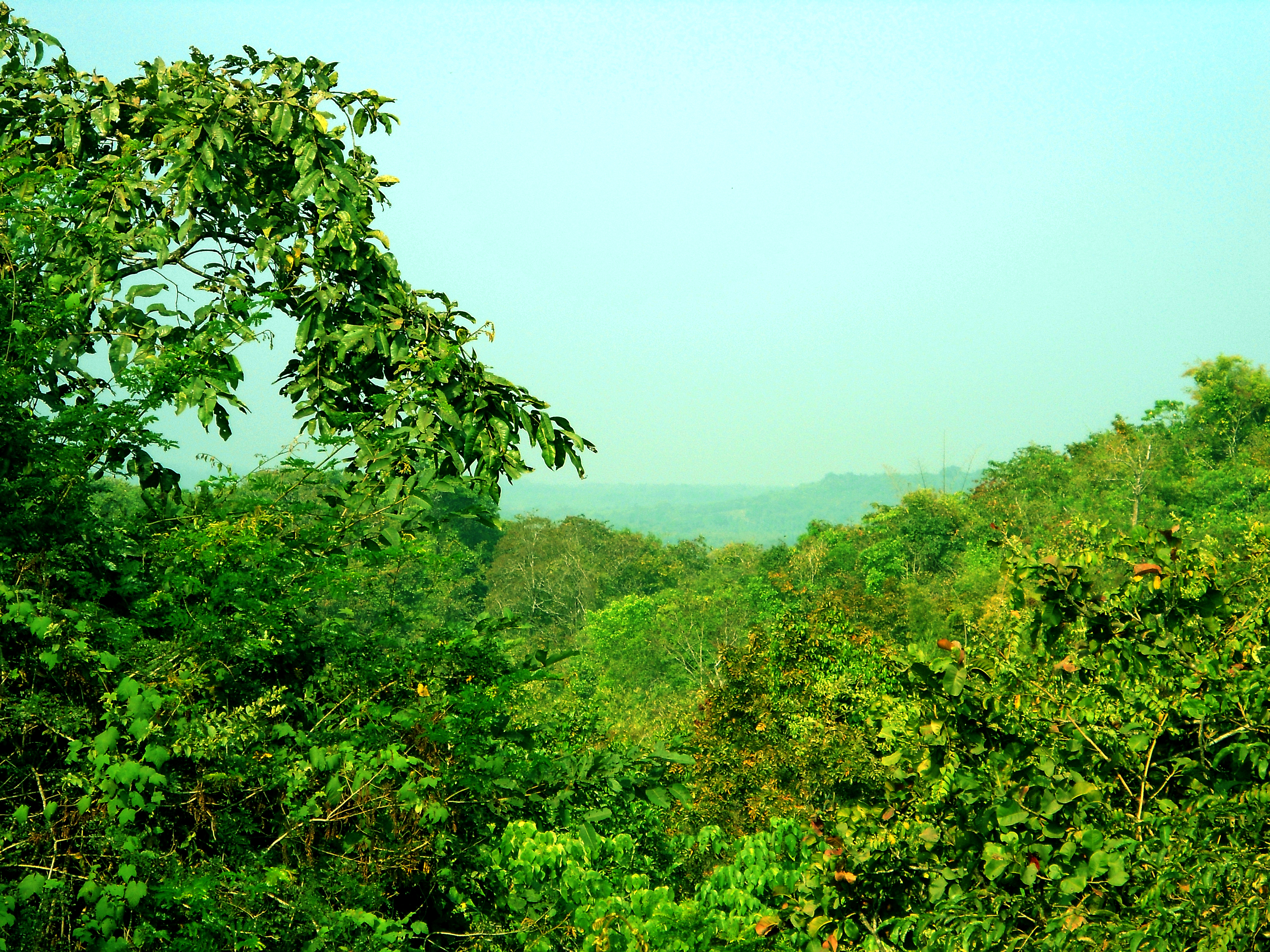
Forest at Eturnagaram, Telangana

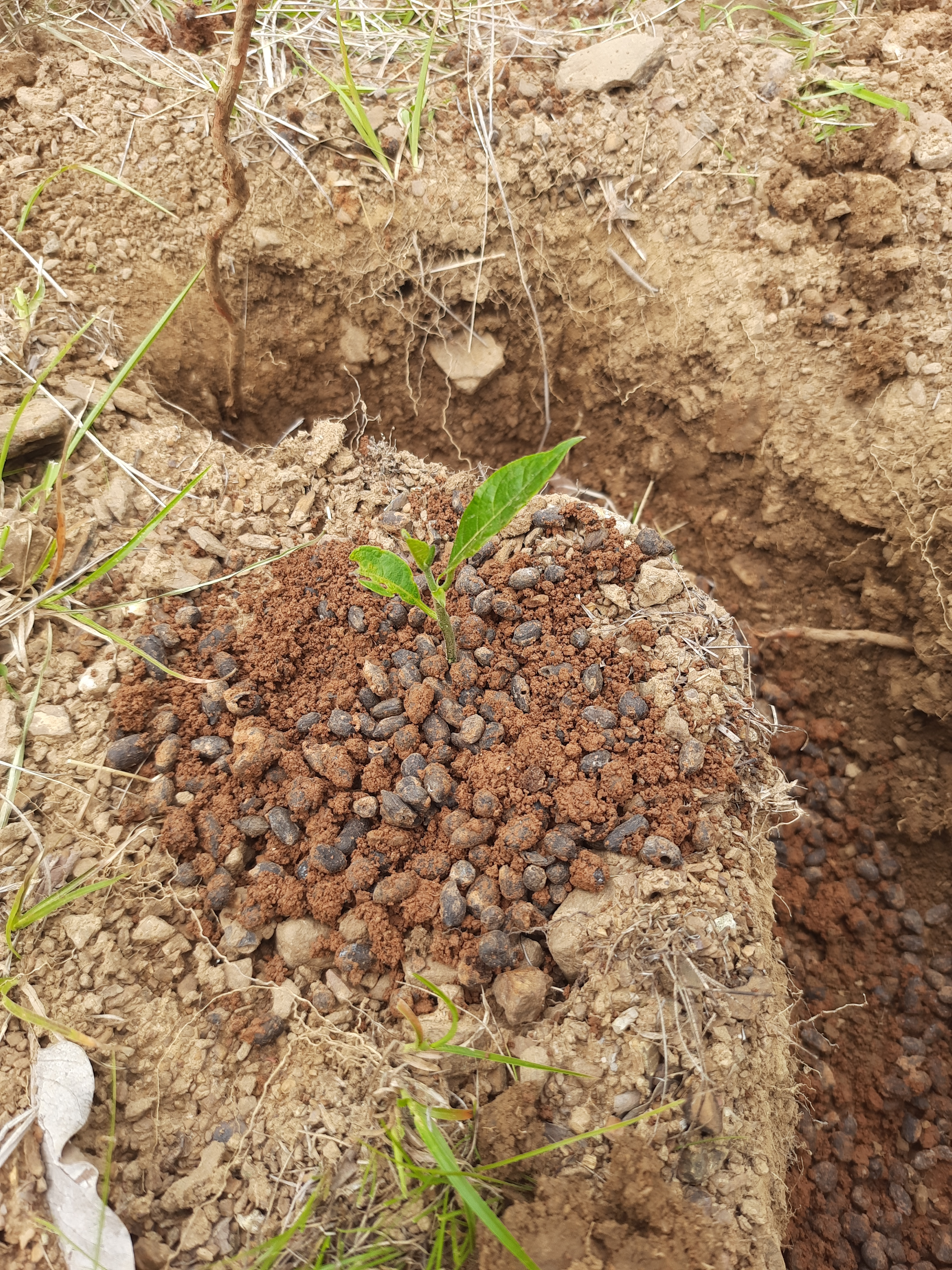
Jackfruit planted in Forest.

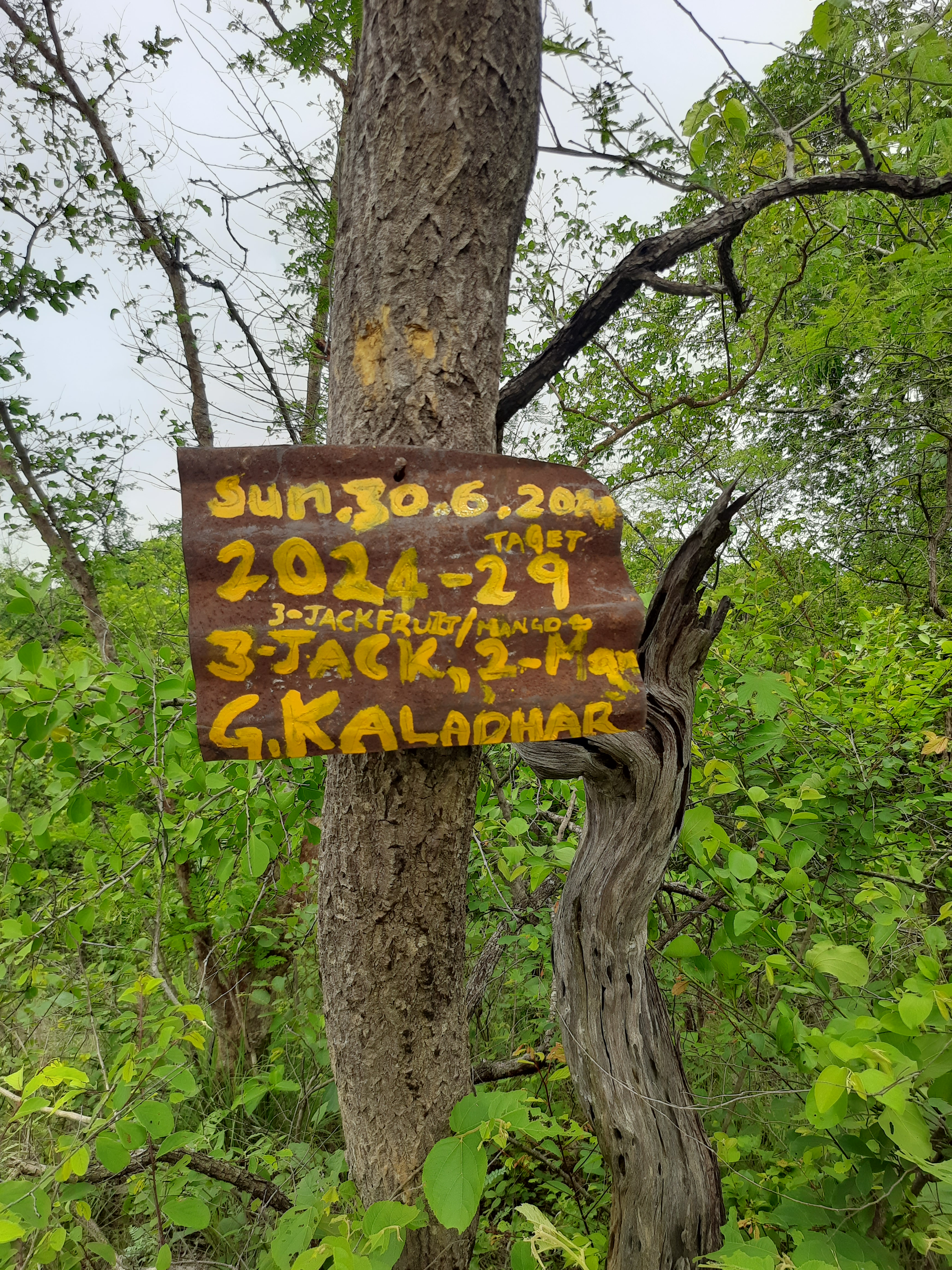
Board of planted species

Eturnagaram Wildlife Sanctuary is a wildlife sanctuary located in Eturnagaram village in Mulugu district in Telangana, India. It is located 100 km (62 mi) from Warangal and 250 km (160 mi) from Hyderabad. It is a integrated tribal development town.

The sanctuary is located near the Maharashtra, Chhattisgarh and Telangana borders. It is one of the oldest sanctuaries of Telangana. On 30 January 1952, the erstwhile Hyderabad Government declared it as a sanctuary because of its rich bio-diversity.

The land is undulating from steep slopes to gentle slopes from west to east. Three-quarters of the area consists of a plain while the rest is hilly with many streams and springs. The Godavari River passes through the sanctuary. The vegetation here is tropical dry deciduous with teak and other trees of good quality standing 60 ft (18 m) and above. The biennial festival of Sammakka Saralamma Jatara is held in the sanctuary.

== Flora and fauna ==
Flora : The sanctuary has southern tropical dry deciduous type of teak and its associates like thiruman, maddi, and bamboo, madhuca, terminalia, and pterocarpus.

Fauna : A perennial water source called "Dayyam Vagu", divides the sanctuary into almost two halves. It is home to Tiger, Leopard, Wolf, Dholes, Golden jackals, Sloth bear, Chousingha, Wild boar, Guar, Grey junglefowl, Blackbuck, Nilgai, Sambar, Spotted deer, Chinkara, and Indian giant squirrels. Also found are many kinds of birds, and reptiles such as Mugger crocodile, Python, Cobra, and Krait.

== Collapse of Trees ==
Thousands of trees fell down in Eturnagaram Wildlife Sanctuary in Telangana due to a Tornado event on August 31, 2024. A catastrophic weather phenomenon flattened an estimated 50,000 trees over 332 hectares in Mulugu's Eturnagaram Wildlife Sanctuary on August 31 devastating the landscape. But none of Wildlife animals are not died, may they predicted phenomenon before it took place.

== Park-specific information ==
Location : 100 km (62 mi) From Warangal, Telangana.

Coverage area : 812 km^{2} (314 sq mi)

Main attractions : Tiger, Panther, Gaur, Sambar, Cheetal, Nilgai, Black Buck.

Best time to visit : October to May

Accommodation : Forest Cottages and Rest House Tadvai, ITDA Guest House at Eturnagaram.

Research: The Rev.Dr.J.W.Prakash, Principal of Bishop Jesudasan Junior college of Church of South India (CSI) Mission have done some research and published some articles in various national and international journals.

By rail : Nearest railway station is Warangal.

By air : Nearest Airport Hyderabad.

By road : 100 km (62 mi) from Warangal and 200 km (120 mi) from Hyderabad.
