= Laknavaram Lake =

Lake in Telangana, India

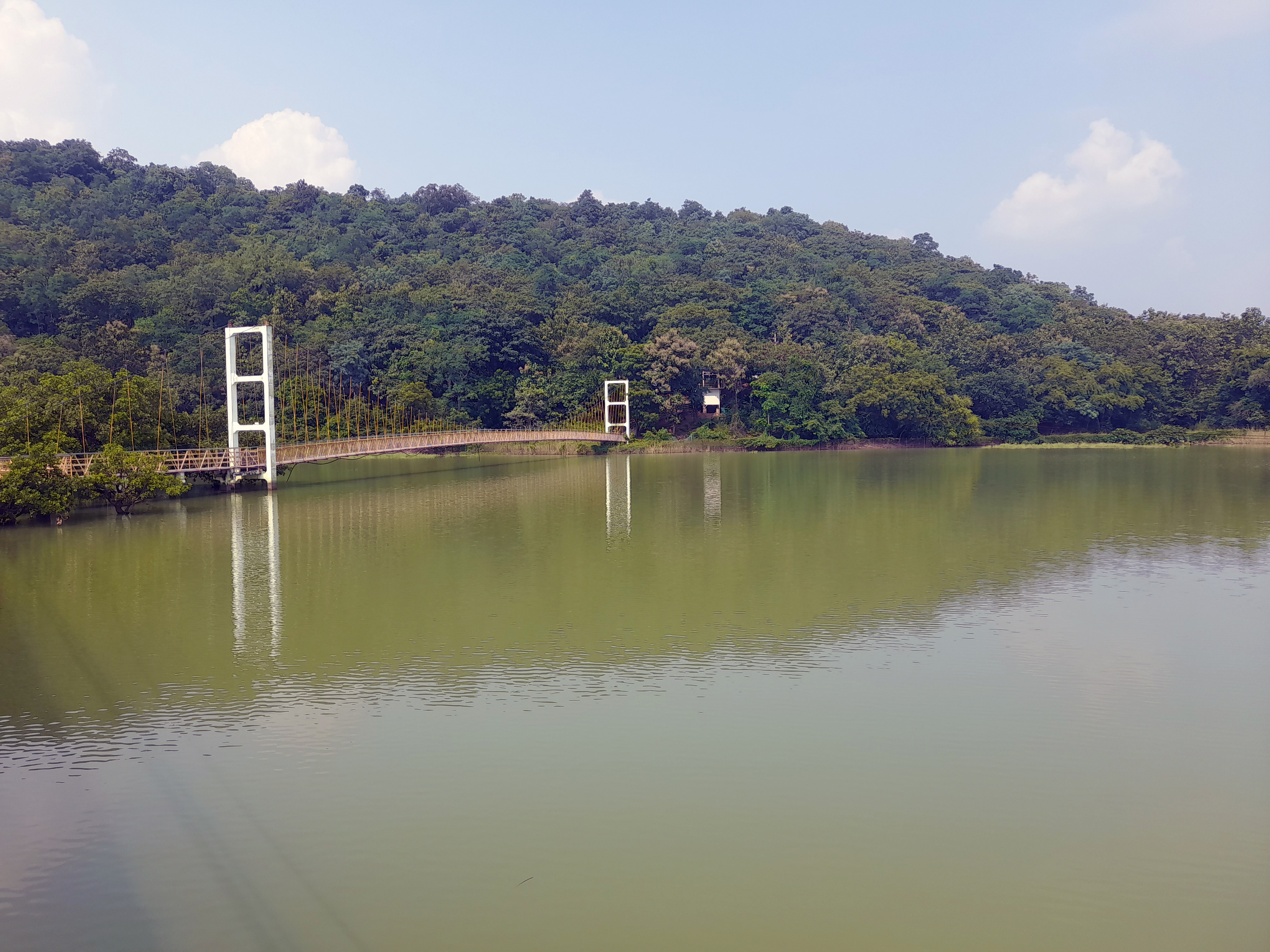
- Laknavaram Hanging Bridge

- Location within Telangana
- Location: Govindaraopet mandal, Mulugu district, Telangana State, India
- Coordinates: 18.15044°N 80.06960°E
- Type: Manmade lake
- Basin countries: India
- Built: 13th century
- Surface area: 40.4 km^{2} (15.6 sq mi)
- Max. depth: 33.6 feet (10.2 m)
- Water volume: 2,135,000,000 cubic feet (60,500,000 m^{3})
- Surface elevation: 1,759 ft (536 m)
- Frozen: Never
- Islands: 13
- Settlements: Warangal

Laknavaram Lake is a lake in Govindaraopet mandal in Mulugu district. It is 17 kilometres (11 mi) from Mulugu and 80 kilometres (50 mi) from Warangal, Telangana.

== History ==
Laknavaram Lake is built by the Kakatiya dynasty in 13th century.

== Geography ==
The lake is spread over an area of 10,000 acres and holds about 2,135,000,000 cubic feet (60,500,000 m^{3}) of water. It irrigates over 3,500 acres of land. It was built by Kakatiya kings. It has about 13 islands in it and has a 160 metres long hanging bridge, which connects three islands. It is surrounded by a thick deciduous forest and it is a very popular tourist spot.

== Facilities ==
Telangana tourism developed new accommodation at Laknavaram Lake. The facilities include cottages, a viewing tower, a pantry, and a ferry from the main banks to the island. Three of the islands are turned into tourist centres and are designated with numbers. Island 1 is connected with land by three hanging bridges. One of the bridges connects the island directly to the mainland. Another pair of bridges also connects the island via another island. Islands 2 and 3 are not connected to the mainland so boats are the only options to reach them. However, there is a bridge that connects islands 2 and 3. Cottages, tents and glass houses provide accommodation. Speed boats and pontoon boat rides are available on the lake.

== Awards ==
In 2016, the wooden air-conditioned cottages at the resorts of the lake won an innovative product title at a travel and tourism fair held by Fairfest Media Limited in Kolkata.
