= Telangana Council of Ministers =

Executive of the Indian state of Telangana

The Telangana Council of Ministers is the executive wing of Government of Telangana and headed by Chief Minister of Telangana, who is the head of government and leader of the state cabinet. The term of every executive wing is for 5 years. The council of ministers are assisted by department secretaries attached to each ministry who are from IAS Telangana Cadre. The chief executive officer responsible for issuing orders on behalf of government is Chief Secretary to the state government.

== Constitutional requirement ==
=== For the Council of Ministers to aid and advise Governor ===
According to Article 163 of the Constitution of India,

There shall be a Council of Ministers with the Chief Minister at the head to aid and advise the Governor in the exercise of his function, except in so far as he is by or under this Constitution required to exercise his functions or any of them in his discretion.

1. If any question arises whether any matter is or is not a matter as respects which the Governor is by or under this Constitution required to act in his discretion, the decision of the Governor in his discretion shall be final, and the validity of anything done by the Governor shall not be called in question on the ground that he ought or ought not to have acted in his discretion.
2. The question whether any, and if so what, advice was tendered by Ministers to the Governor shall not be inquired into in any court.

This means that the Ministers serve under the pleasure of the Governor and he/she may remove them, on the advice of the Chief Minister, whenever they want.

=== For other provisions as to Ministers ===
According to Article 164 of the Constitution of India,

The Chief Minister shall be appointed by the Governor and the other Ministers shall be appointed by the Governor on the advice of the Chief Minister, and the Minister shall hold office during the pleasure of the Governor:
Provided that in the States of Bihar, Madhya Pradesh and Orissa, there shall be a Minister in charge of tribal welfare who may in addition be in charge of the welfare of the Scheduled Castes and backward classes or any other work.

1. The Council of Minister shall be collectively responsible to the Legislative Assembly of the State.
2. Before a Minister enters upon his office, the Governor shall administer to him the oaths of office and of secrecy according to the forms set out for the purpose in the Third Schedule.
3. A Minister who for any period of six consecutive months is not a member of the Legislature of the State shall at the expiration of that period cease to be a Minister.
4. The salaries and allowances of Ministers shall be such as the Legislature of the State may from time to time by law determine and, until the Legislature of the State so determines, shall be a specified in the Second Schedule.

== Chief Minister ==
Like any Indian state, Chief Ministers of Telangana is the real head of the government and responsible for state administration. He is the leader of the parliamentary party in the legislature and heads the state cabinet. The current Chief Minister is Revanth Reddy.

== State Cabinet ==
As per the Constitution of India, all portfolios of state government is vested in Chief Minister, who distribute various portfolio to individual ministers whom he nominates to the State Governor. The state governor appoints individual ministers for various portfolios and departments as per advice of Chief Minister and together form the State Cabinet. As the original portfolios are vested with CM, who delegates to others upon his/her wish, actions of individual ministers are part of collective responsibility of the state cabinet and Chief Minister is responsible for actions of each minister. The state cabinet along with Chief Minister, prepares General policy and individual department policy, which will be guiding policy for day-to-day administration of each minister.

=== Current Cabinet ===
This is the current Cabinet of Telangana headed by the Chief Minister of Telangana, Revanth Reddy:

Portfolio	Minister	Constituency	Tenure		Party
Portfolio	Minister	Constituency	Took office	Left office	Party
Chief Minister
Municipal Administration and Urban Development; General Administration; Law & Order; Other departments not allocated to any Minister	Anumula Revanth Reddy	Kodangal	07 December 2023	Incumbent	INC
Deputy Chief Minister
Finance & Planning; Energy	Mallu Bhatti Vikramarka	Madhira (SC)	07 December 2023	Incumbent	INC
Cabinet Ministers
Irrigation & Command Area Development; Food & Civil Supplies	Nalamada Uttam Kumar Reddy	Huzurnagar	07 December 2023	Incumbent	INC
Transport; Backward Classes Welfare	Ponnam Prabhakar	Husnabad	07 December 2023	Incumbent	INC
Roads & Buildings; Cinematography	Komatireddy Venkat Reddy	Nalgonda	07 December 2023	Incumbent	INC
Environment & Forests; Endowments	Konda Surekha	Warangal East	07 December 2023	03 September 2026	INC
Panchayat Raj & Rural Development (including Rural Water Supply); Women & Child Development	Dansari Anasuya Seethakka	Mulug (ST)	07 December 2023	Incumbent	INC
Information Technology; Electronics & Communications; Industries & Commerce; Legislative Affairs	Duddilla Sridhar Babu	Manthani	07 December 2023	Incumbent	INC
Revenue and Housing; Information & Public Relations	Ponguleti Srinivasa Reddy	Palair	07 December 2023	Incumbent	INC
Agriculture; Marketing; Co-operation; Handlooms & Textiles	Thummala Nageswara Rao	Khammam	07 December 2023	Incumbent	INC
Health.; Medical & Family Welfare; Science and Technology	Cilarapu Damodar Raja Narasimha	Andole (SC)	07 December 2023	Incumbent	INC
Prohibition & Excise; Tourism & Culture; Archaeology	Jupally Krishna Rao	Kollapur	07 December 2023	Incumbent	INC
Labour, Employment, Training & Factories; Mines & Geology	Gaddam Vivekanand	Chennur (SC)	08 June 2025	Incumbent	INC
Scheduled Castes Development; Tribal Welfare; Empowerment of Persons with Disabilities, Senior Citizens, and Transgender Persons	Adluri Laxman Kumar	Dharmapuri (SC)	08 June 2025	Incumbent	INC
Animal Husbandry, Dairy Development & Fisheries; Sports & Youth Services	Vakiti Srihari	Makthal	08 June 2025	Incumbent	INC
Public Enterprises; Minorities Welfare	Mohammad Azharuddin	Provisional (Note: Appointed as minister subject to election as a MLA or MLC within six months)	31 October 2025	Incumbent	INC

== Cabinet Meetings ==
On 25th November 2025 the state cabinet has resolved to merge municipalities and corporations within the Telangana core urban area limits into the Greater Hyderabad Municipal Corporation.

== Oath as the state chief minister/minister ==
I, <Name of Chief Minister/Minister>, do swear in the name of God/solemnly affirm that I will bear true faith and allegiance to the Constitution of India as by law established, that I will uphold the sovereignty and integrity of India, that I will faithfully and conscientiously discharge my duties as a Minister for the State of () and that I will do right to all manner of people in accordance with the Constitution and the law without fear or favour, affection or ill-will.
