= Bogatha Waterfall =

Waterfall in Telangana, India

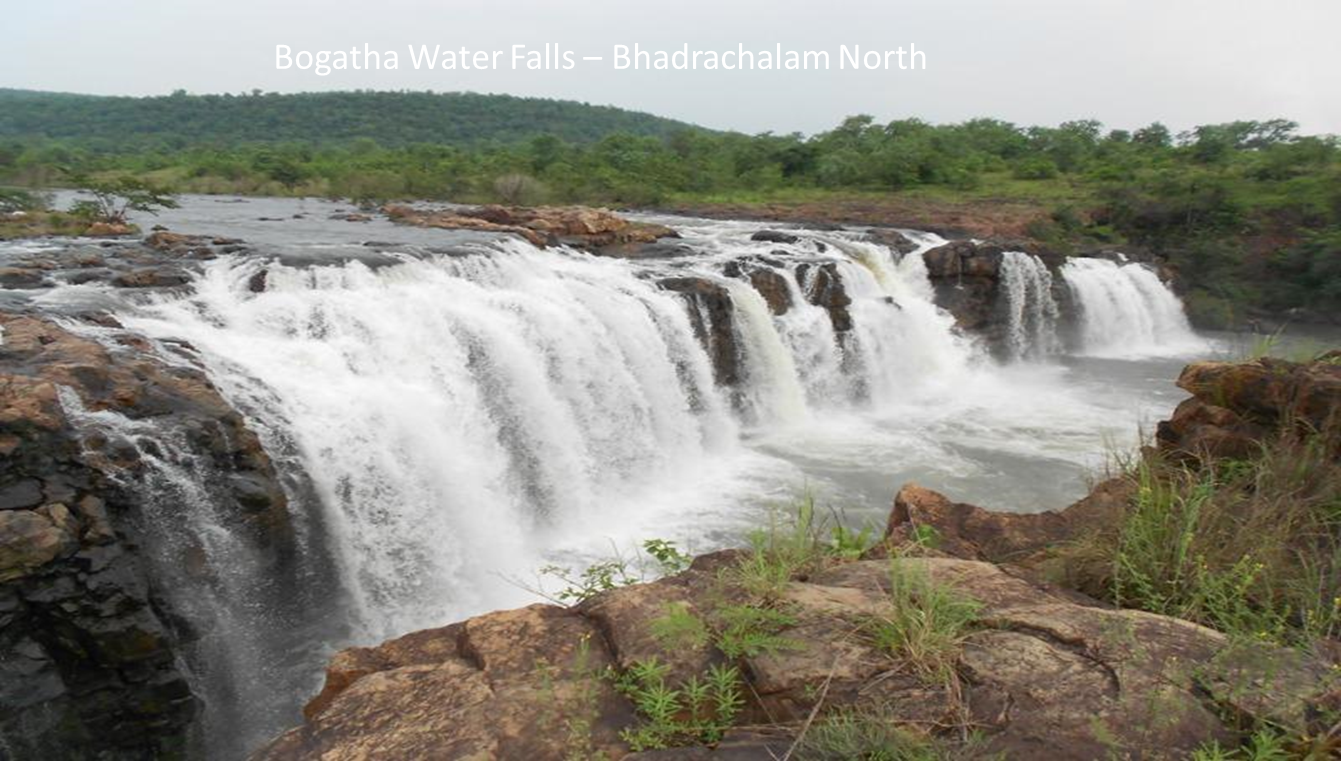
- Bogatha-Waterfall

- Location within Telangana
- Location: cheekupally, vajedu, Mulugu district, Telangana
- Coordinates: 18°28′34″N 80°30′00″E
- Type: Waterfall

Bogatha Waterfall is a waterfall located on the Cheekupally stream, Wazeedu Mandal, Mulugu district, Telangana. It is located 120 kilometers (75 mi) from Bhadrachalam, 90 kilometers (56 mi) from Mulugu and 140 kilometers (87 mi) from Warangal. The newly constructed Eturnagaram bridge on National Highway 163 reduced the travelling distance to Hyderabad from 440 kilometers (270 mi) to 329 kilometers (204 mi).

Of the waterfalls in Mulugu District, Telangana state, it is the second largest waterfall in the Telangana region.

== Tourism ==
Water flows throughout the year, but the highest flows are between June and November (after the monsoon). There is no road directly to the waterfall, so visitors have to trek for some distance to reach the waterfall.

Bogatha is colloquially known as "the Telangana Niagara" and "Telangana Niagara jalapatham".

== See also ==
- List of waterfalls
- List of waterfalls in India
- Kuntala Waterfall
- Pochera Falls
