= Chalvai =

Village in Mulugu district, Telangana, India

Chalvai is a village in Mulugu district, Telangana state, India.
