= Azmeera Chandulal =

Indian politician (1954–2021)

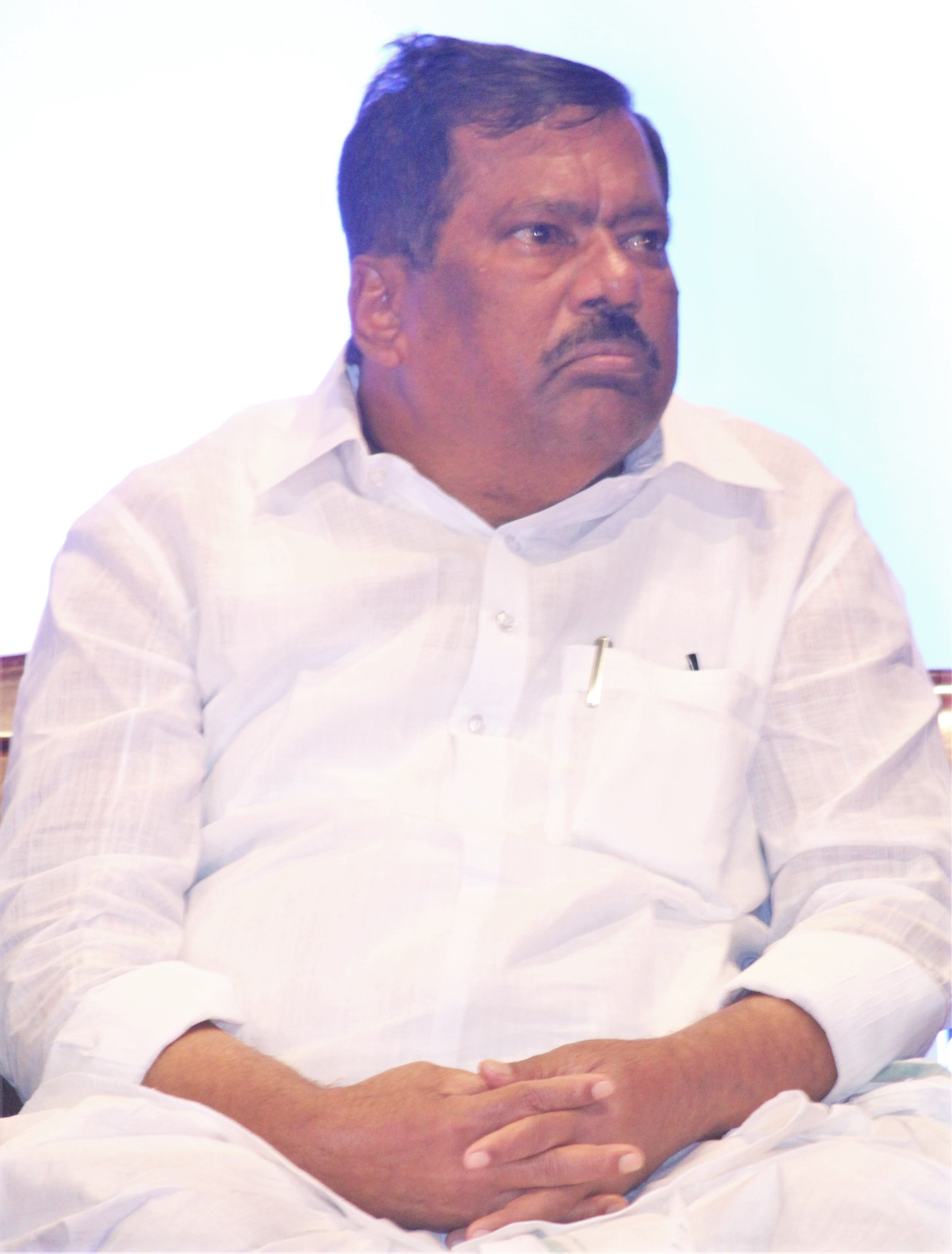

Member of Telangana Legislative Assembly
- In office 2014-18
- Succeeded by: Dansari Anasuya (Seethakka)
- Constituency: Mulugu

Personal details
- Born: 17 August 1954 Sarangapally, Jaggannapet, Mulugu district, Telangana State
- Died: 15 April 2021 (aged 66) KIMS hospital, Hyderabad, Telangana
- Party: BRS
- Spouse: A. Sharada
- Children: 4
- Parents: A. Meetu Naik (father); A. Meera Bai (mother)

Azmeera Chandulal (17 August 1954 – 15 April 2021) was an Indian politician who served as Tourism and Tribal Welfare Minister of Telangana and Member of Legislative Assembly from Mulugu constituency until 2018.

== Early life ==
Azmeera Chandulal was born on 17 August 1954 at Jaggannapet in Warangal District.

== Political career ==
He once served the state government of Andhra Pradesh as Minister for Tribal Welfare as a ruling party member under Nandamuri Taraka Rama Rao (NTR). He was elected three times to Assembly from Mulugu Constituency as Legislative Member, and twice as a Member of Parliament from Warangal.

In 2014 Telangana Assembly Election he was re-elected from Mulugu Assembly constituency. He was inducted into Cabinet on June 2, 2014, and made Tourism and Culture Minister of Telangana.

== Personal life ==
He was married to Sharada and had 3 sons.

== Positions held ==
- 1981-85 Sarpanch, Village Jaggannapet Mandal, Warangal district, Andhra Pradesh
- 1985-89 and Member, Andhra Pradesh Legislative Assembly (1st term)
- 1986-88 and chairman, Committee on the Welfare of Scheduled Castes and Scheduled Tribes
- 1989 Cabinet Minister, Tribal Welfare, Andhra Pradesh
- 1994 to 1996 Re-elected to Member, Andhra Pradesh Legislative Assembly (2nd term)
- 1994-96 Member, Politbureau, Telugu Desam Party
- 1996 Elected to 11th Lok Sabha (1st term) Warangal
- 1996-97 Member, Committee on Labour and Welfare
- 1998 Re-elected to 12th Lok Sabha (2nd term) Warangal
- 1998-99 Member, Committee on Human Resource Development
- Member, Committee on Labour and Welfare
- Member, Committee on Members of Parliament Local Area Development Scheme
- Member, Consultative Committee, Ministry of Social Justice and Empowerment
- 1999-2001 S.T. Cell State President, Telugu Desam Party
- 2001-2003 Director TRIFED, New Delhi, Govt. of India
- 2003-2005 TRICOR Chairman, Andhra Pradesh
- 2004 Joined Telangana Rashtra Samithi
- 2006 Politbureau Member, Telangana Rashtra Samithi
- 2014 Re-elected, Member of Legislative Assembly, Mulugu Constituency, Warangal Dist., Telangana State (3rd term)
- 2014 to December 2018 – Minister Tribal welfare, tourism and cultural portfolios, Telangana
