= Kothabestagudem =

KothaBestaGudem is a village, also known as Kotha Mallur, in Mangapet, Jayashankar Bhupalpally district, Telangana, India.

KothaBestaGudem village is 140 km away from Hanamkonda. It is surrounded by forest.
