= Nehru Zoological Park =

Zoo in Telangana, India

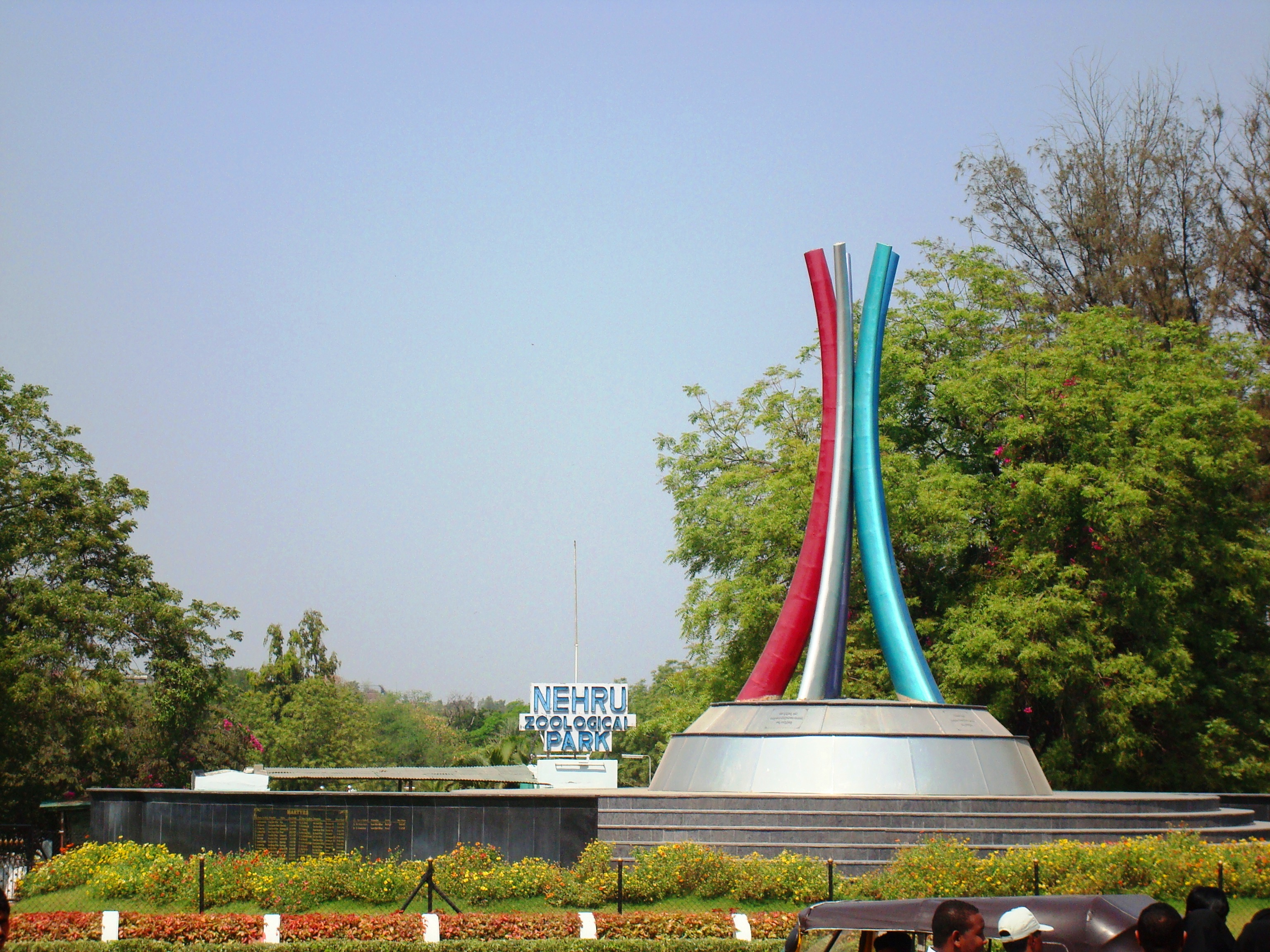
- Interactive map of Nehru Zoological Park
- 17°21′04″N 78°26′59″E
- Date opened: 26 October 1959 (67 years ago)
- Location: Hyderabad, Telangana, IN
- Land area: 380 acres (153.8 ha)
- No. of animals: 900+
- No. of species: 100+
- Volume of largest tank: 600-acre (240 ha)
- Annual visitors: 22.7 Lakhs
- Memberships: Central Zoo Authority of India
- Major exhibits: 159
- Owner: Ministry of State for Forest and Environment, Telangana
- Director: Dr. Sunil S. Hiremath, I.F.S.
- Website: Official website

Nehru Zoological Park (also known as Zoo Park) is a zoo located near Mir Alam Tank in Bahadurpura, Telangana, India. It is one of the most visited destinations in Hyderabad.

== History ==
Nehru Zoological Park's construction was started on 26 October 1959 and opened to the public on 6 October 1963. The Park is run by forest department, Government of Telangana, and is named after the first Prime Minister of India, Jawaharlal Nehru.

== Animals and exhibits ==
The zoo occupies 380 acres (150 ha) and is adjacent to the 600-acre (240 ha) Mir Alam Tank. Nearly 100 species of birds, animals and reptiles are housed at the zoo, including indigenous animals like the:

- Indian rhino
- Asiatic lion
- Bengal tiger
- Panther
- Gaur
- Indian elephant
- Slender loris
- Python
- Deer
- Antelope
- Bird

The 600-acre (240 ha) Mir Alam Tank with its multiple arched bund (embankment), attracts hundreds of migratory birds, providing yet another attraction for the zoo.

The nocturnal house at the zoo artificially reverses night and day for the animals so that nocturnal animals are active while visitors are at the zoo. This exhibit includes:

- Fruit bat
- Slender loris
- Slow loris
- Civet
- Leopard cat
- Hedgehog
- Barn owl
- Mottled wood owl
- Fishing owl
- Great horned owl

There is also an:

- Aquarium
- Dino park
- Butterfly park
- Tortoise house.

Since 2014, the zoo is running an adoption program under which people and corporates can adopt an animal or an entire enclosure, paying money for their upkeep.

== Attractions ==
The zoo runs multiple safari trips each day through the safari area where animals such as:

- Asiatic lion
- Bengal tiger
- Sloth bear

etc. are housed. The zoo also has educational shows and feeding sessions scheduled each day. Other attractions include a natural history museum and some trains.

== Conservation ==
Several animals have been bred in the zoo and sent to various deer parks and sanctuaries all over India to restock depleted natural populations. In order to boost captive breeding of vultures at the zoo, the state forest dept requested Maharashtra for 10 of these critically endangered birds.

== Gallery ==
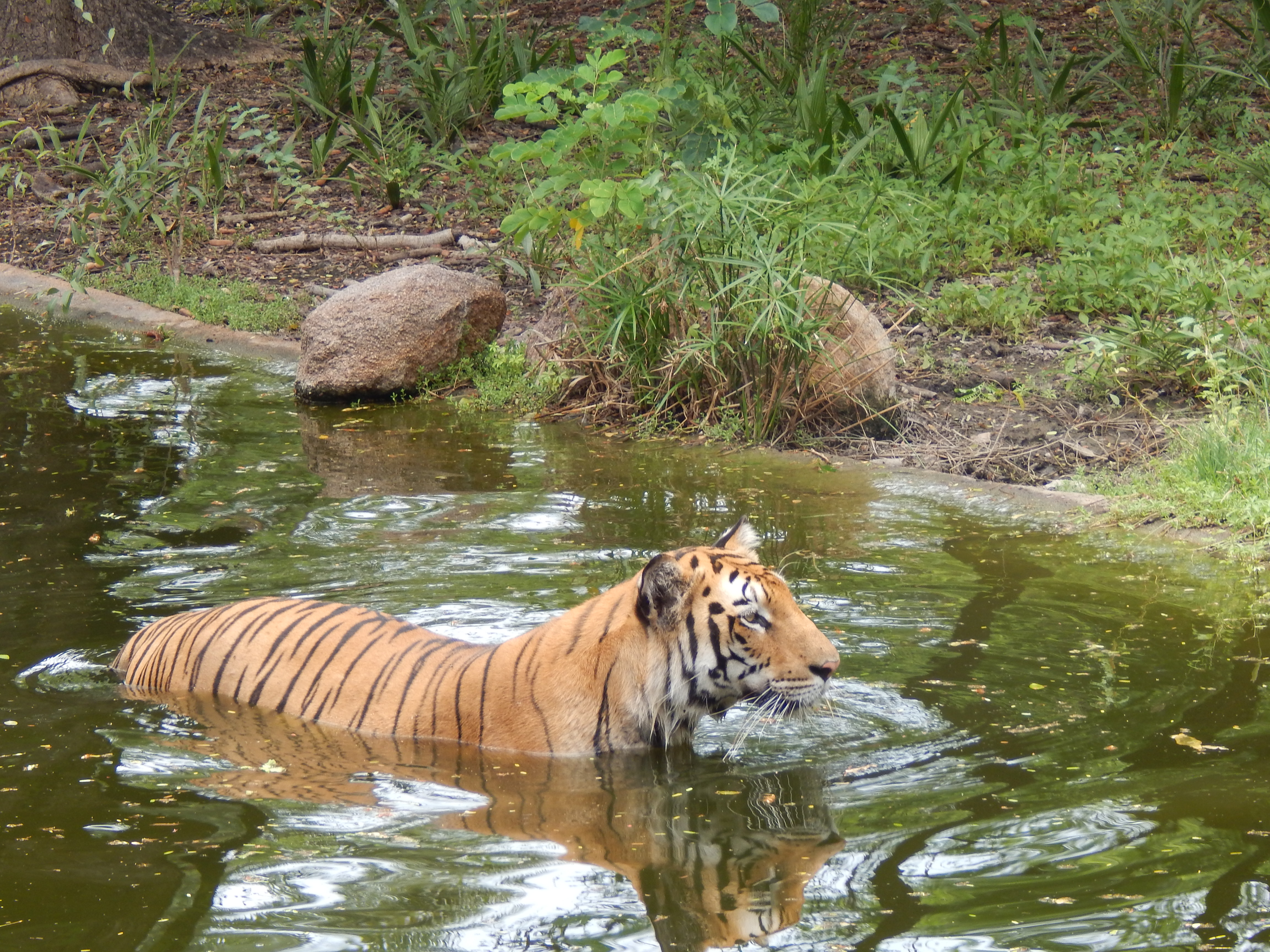
Asian Tiger walks in water

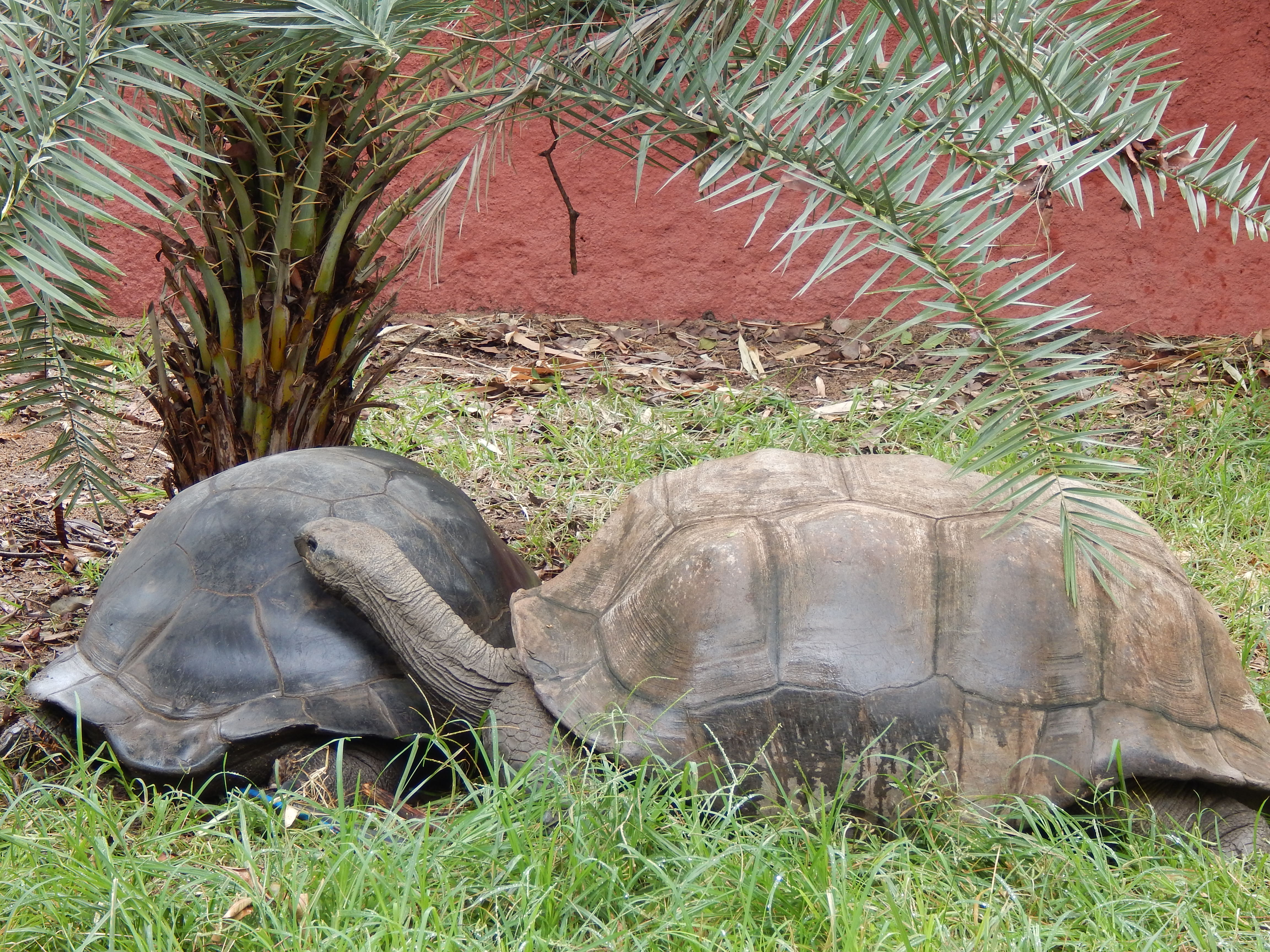
Hyd Zoo - Two Tortoises

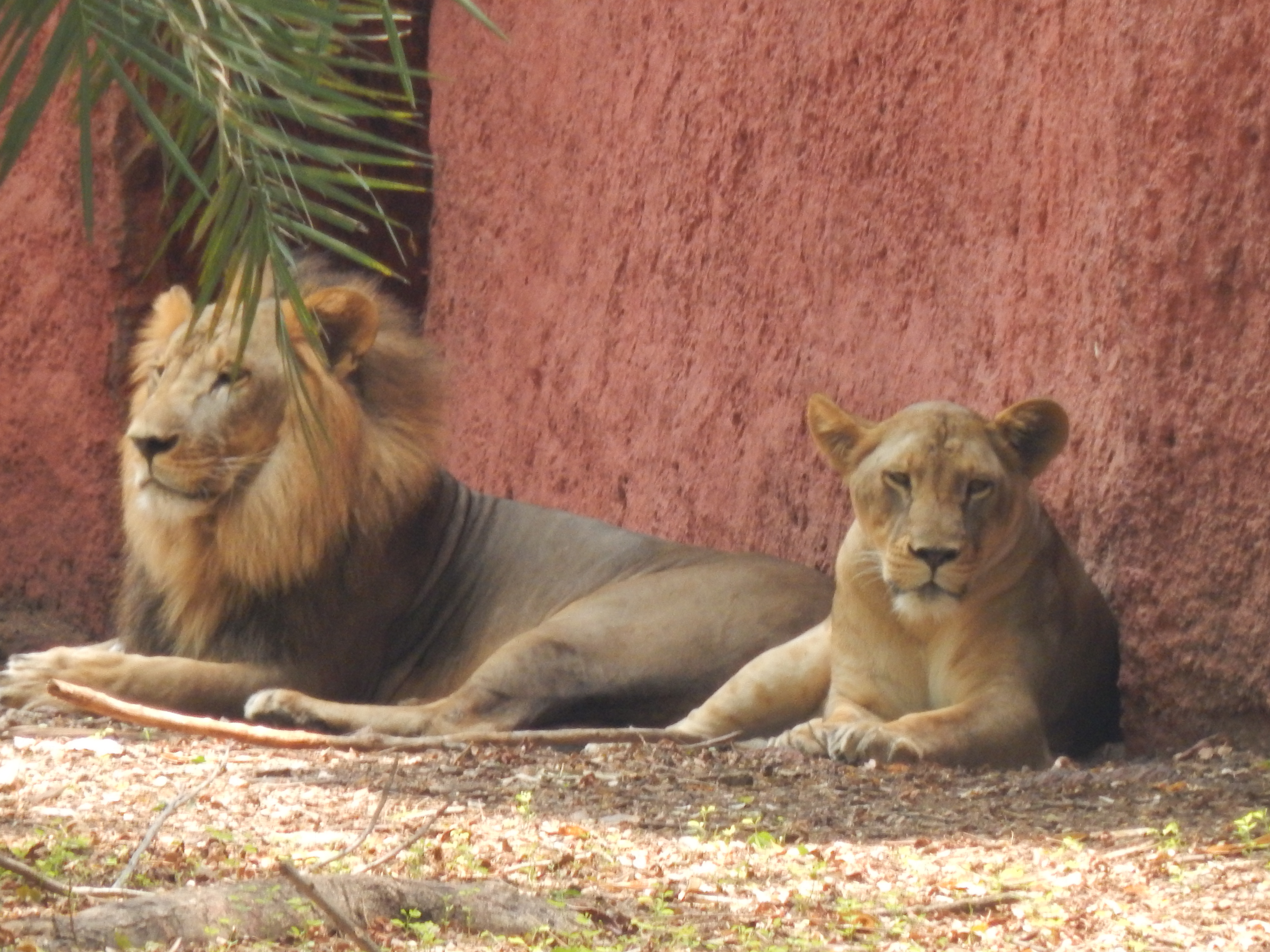
Hyd Zoo - Lion relaxing - Lioness Alert

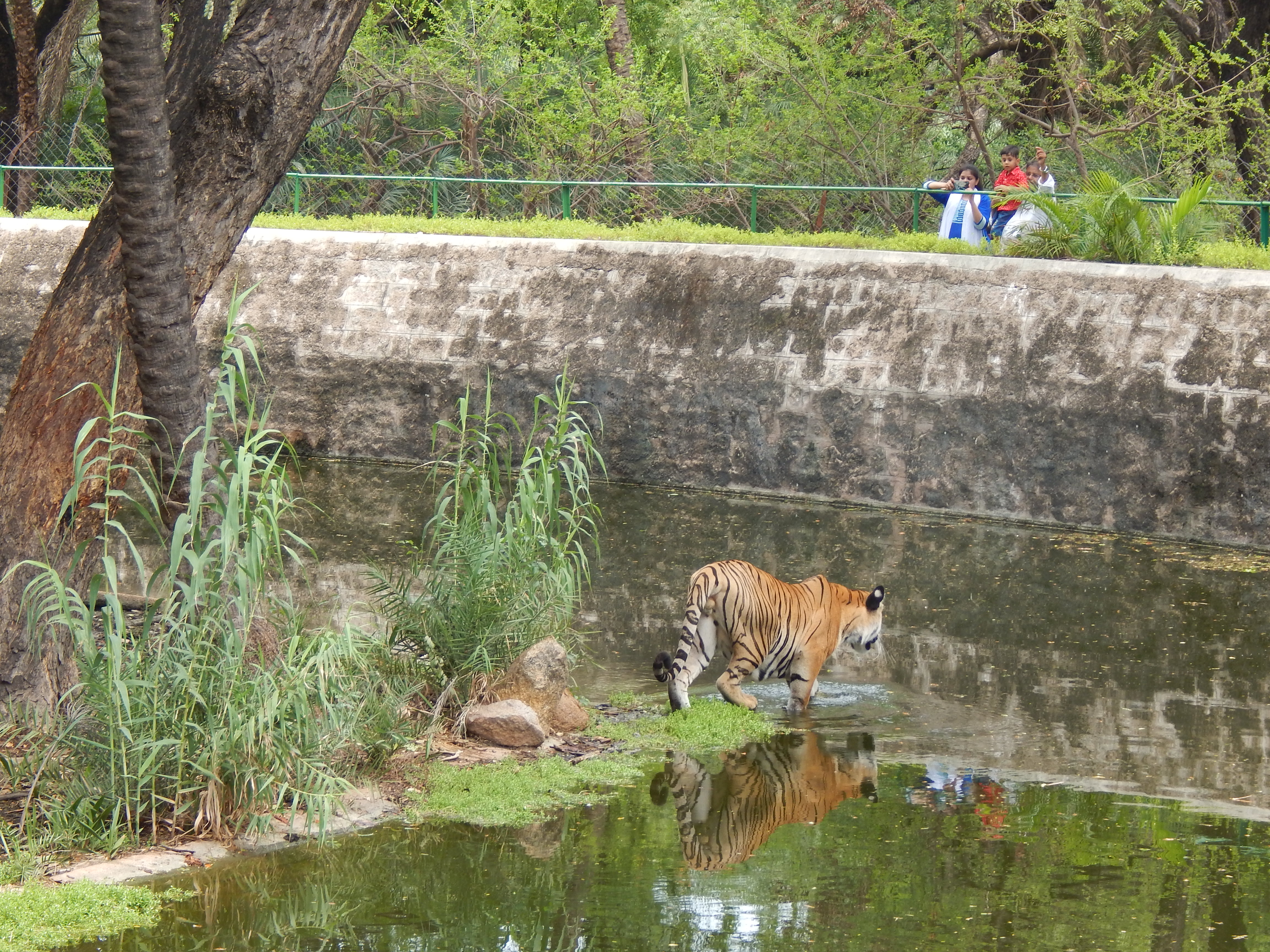
Asian Tiger

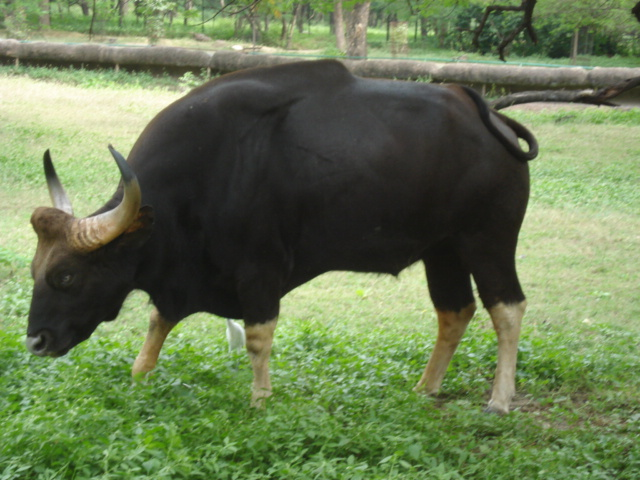
Indian Gaur

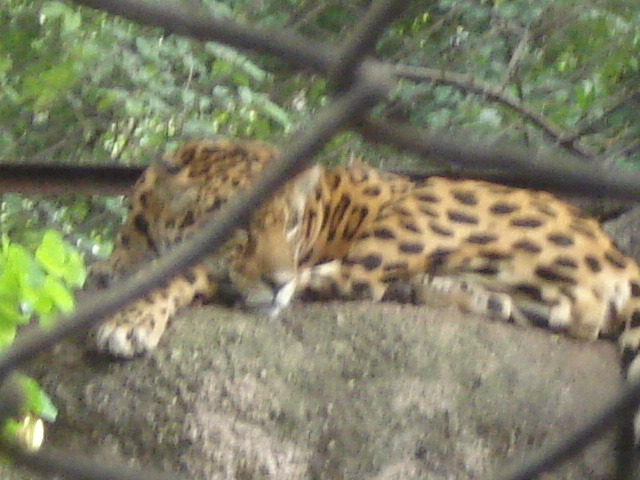
Leopard

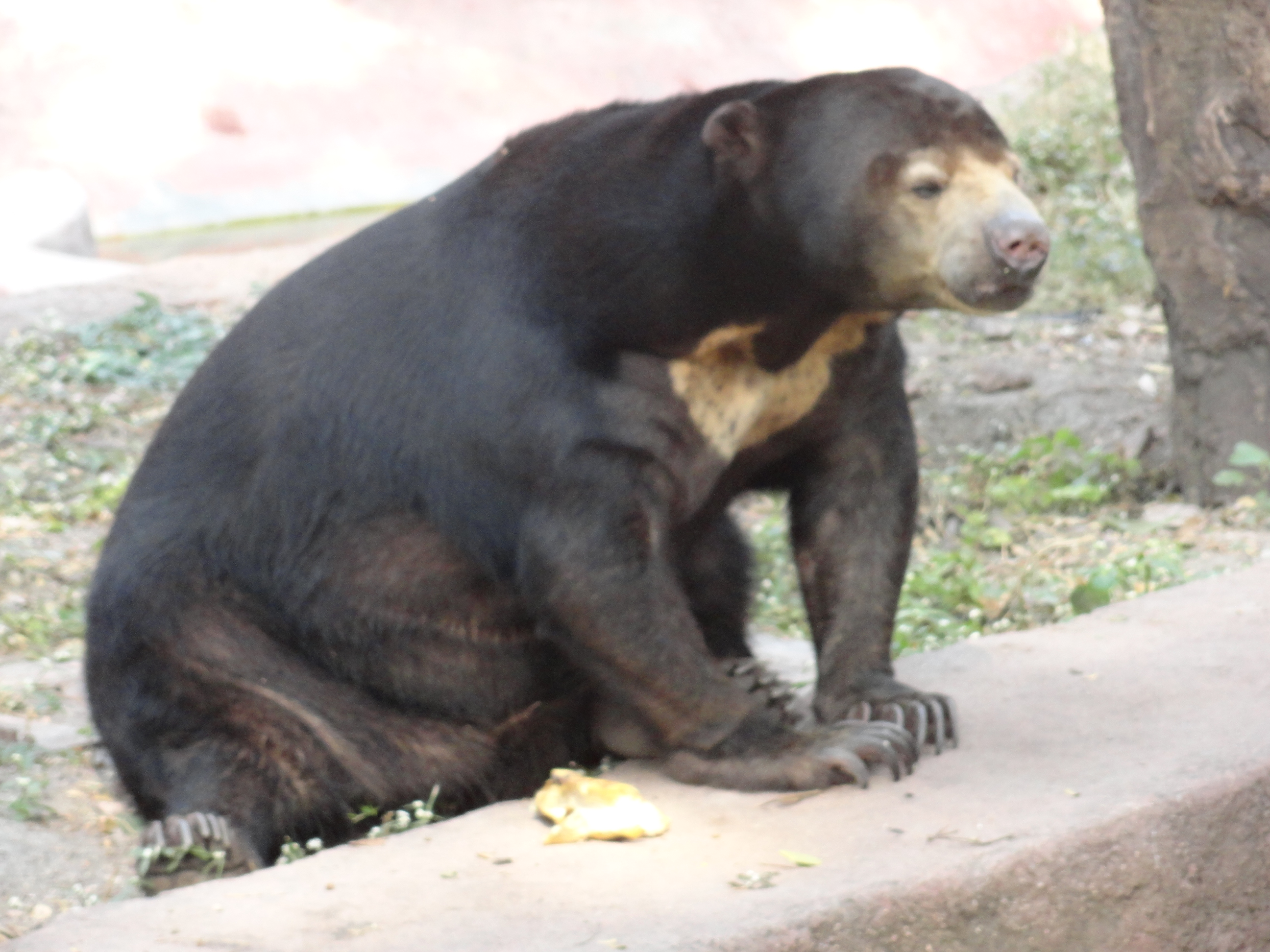
Sunbear at Nehru Zoological Park Hyderabad

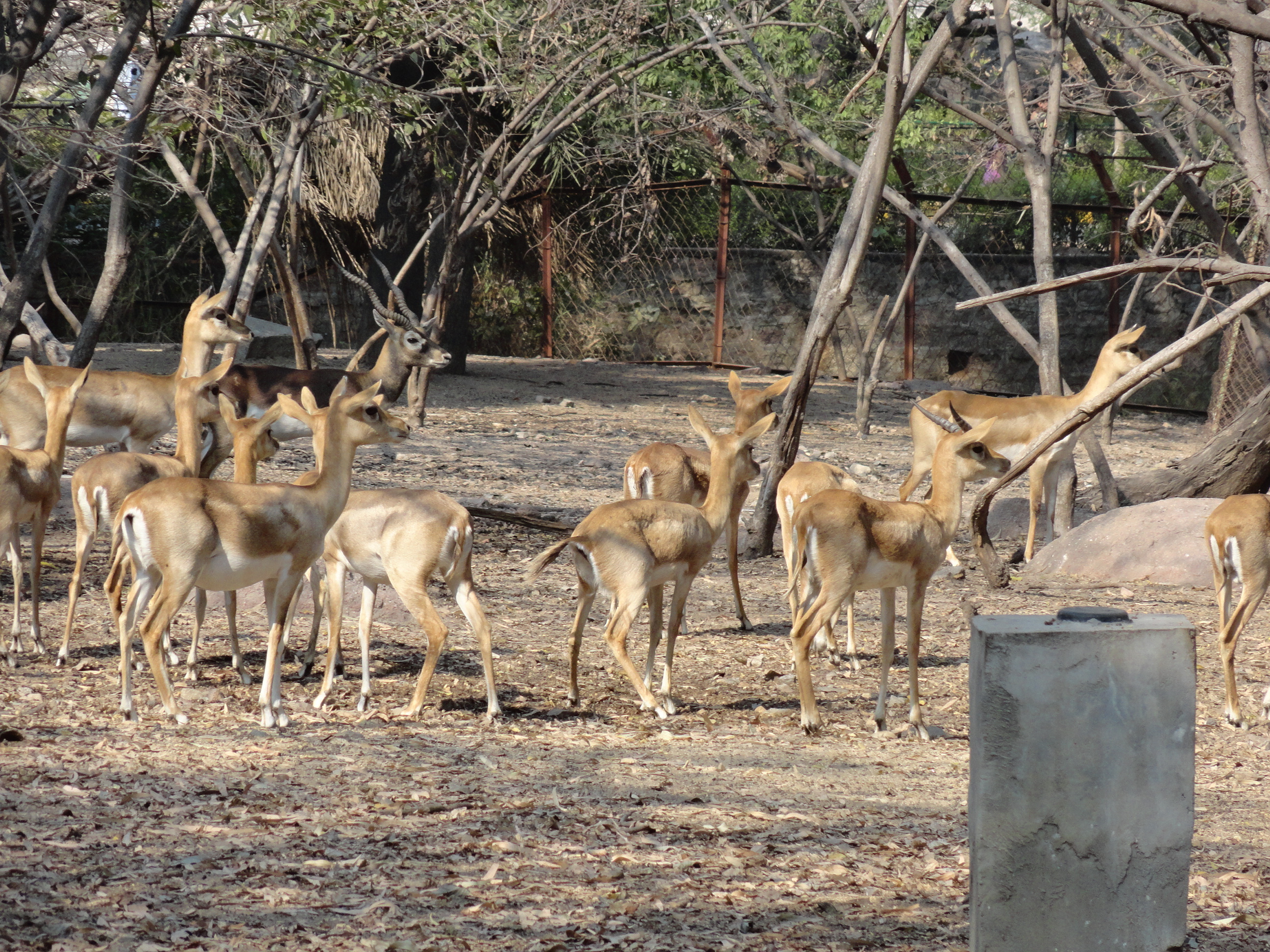
Deer

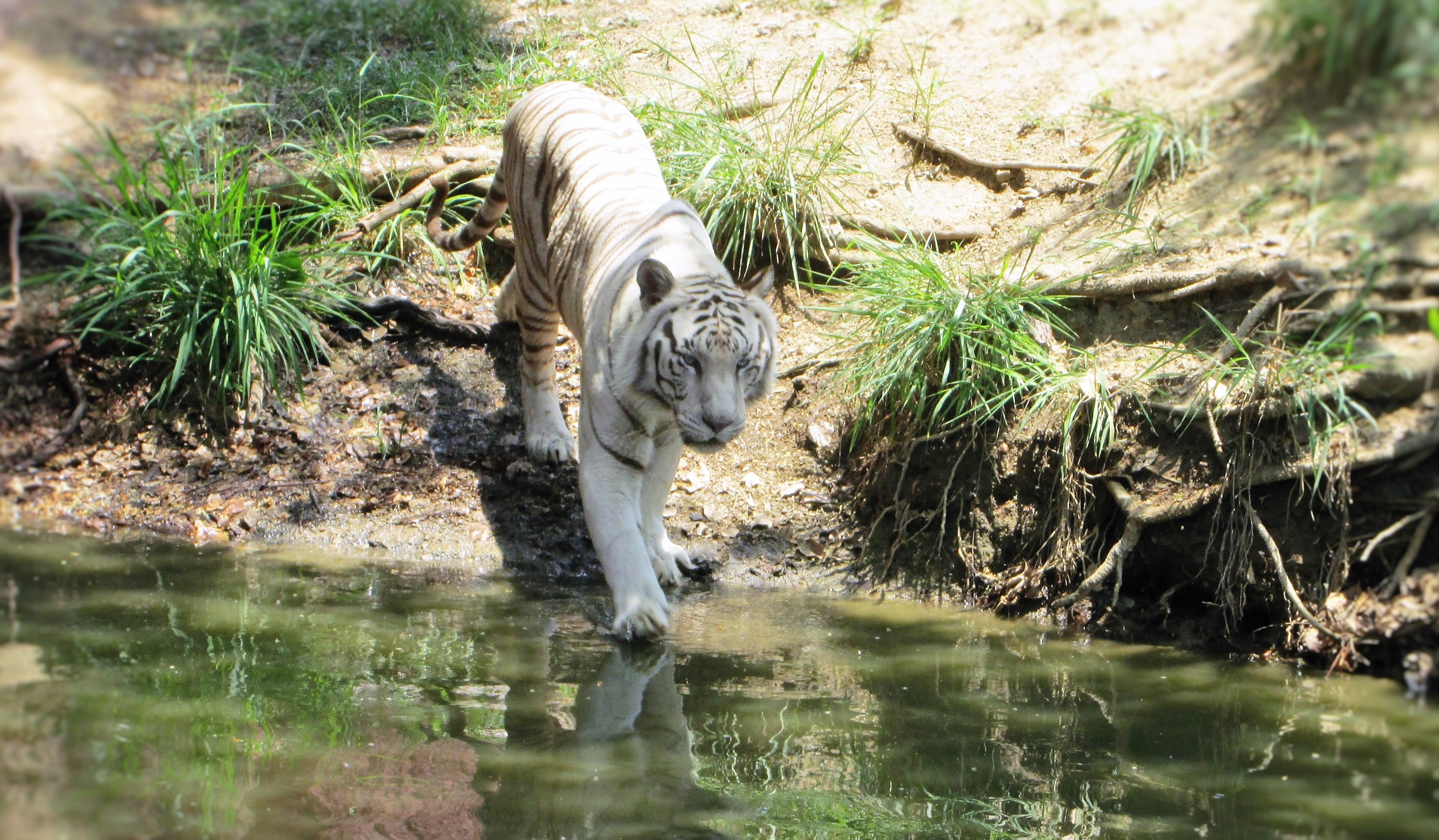
White Tiger.

== See also ==
- Biodiversity park, Hyderabad
- Hyderabad Botanical Garden
- Kothwalguda Eco Park
