= Medaram =

Medaram Hong Kong of Telanagana
- village
- Location in Telangana, India Medaram (India)
- Coordinates: 18°14′31″N 80°5′7″E
- Country: India
- State: Telangana
- District: Mulugu

Languages
  - Official: Telugu
- Time zone: UTC+5:30 (IST)
- Vehicle registration: TS 03
- Coastline: 0 kilometres (0 mi)
- Website: telangana.gov.in

Medaram is a village in Mulugu district, Telangana, India. A popular religious festival called Sammakka Sarakka Jatara takes place biennially in this village. Sammakka Sarakka Jatara held by forest dwelling Koya tribe of Telangana and surrounding States, is the biggest Tribal festival in Asia which is attended by two crore people on an average. The event is held biennially (once in two years) to honour the goddesses Sammakka and her daughter Sarakka. Several communities in Telangana society support Jatara as it is also a mythical narrative of two tribal women leaders who fought against the Kakatiya rulers who tried to annex their land and forests. According to the myth it was Sammakka’s curse which caused gradual decline and death of Kakatiya rule. Sammakka and her daughter saramma protesting there tribal lands and forest.
