= Telangana Forest Department =

Government ministry

- Telangana Atavi Sakha
- Save Forests Save Nation

State Department overview
- Formed: 2 June 2014 (12 years ago)
- Preceding State Department: Andhra Pradesh Forest Department
- Jurisdiction: Telangana
- Headquarters: Aranya Bhavan, NH 44, Opposite RBI Beside Andhra Bank / Saifabad, Saifabad, Khairtabad, Hyderabad, Telangana
- State Minister responsible: --, Minister of Forest and Environment of Telangana
- State Department executives: Sri Jayesh Ranjan, IAS, Spl. Chief Secretary (Environment, Forests, Science & Technology); Sri Vinay Kumar, IFS, Principal Chief Conservator of Forests (HoFF); Sri Vinay Kumar, IFS, Prl.Chief Conservator Of Forests WL & CWLW
- Parent department: Government of Telangana
- Website: https://forests.telangana.gov.in/

Vegetation cover of Telangana as of 2012

The Telangana Forest Department, also known as Ministry of Forest and Environment, is a government Department of Telangana. It is headed by the Principal Chief Conservator of Forests. The primary function of this department is protection, conservation and management of forests in Telangana State.

== History ==
The Forest Department began a statewide "Catch the Trap" initiative in December 2023 to prevent the killing or hunting of wild animals. As part of this, foresters visited different areas to check the homes of suspects or individuals with past hunting activities, looking for hunting materials and devices.

In March 2024, Konda Surekha, the Minister for Forest and Environment, announced on World Forest Day that Telangana State's forest area would be expanded from 24.05 percent to 33 percent, in accordance with the National Forest Policy, 1988.

Department personnel monitor wildlife and disturbances using images captured by strategically located camera traps in the forests. However, the need to frequently replace SD cards in these cameras arises due to storage limitations.In February 2024, the department announced plans to deploy an AI-based system for wildlife conservation. This will aid in monitoring animal migration, species identification, poaching detection, and forest fire early warning.

== Management ==
The Forest Department is organised in an administrative hierarchy ranging from Principal Chief Conservator of Forests to Forest Watchers, Mahouts and others.

=== Principal Chief Conservator of Forests ===
The Principal Chief Conservator of Forests is in charge of Forest Department, who must personally review, approve, and sign all significant orders, permissions, declarations and authorisations.

== Protected areas ==
Telangana has a network of eleven sanctuaries and three national parks in the state.

=== Wildlife sanctuaries ===
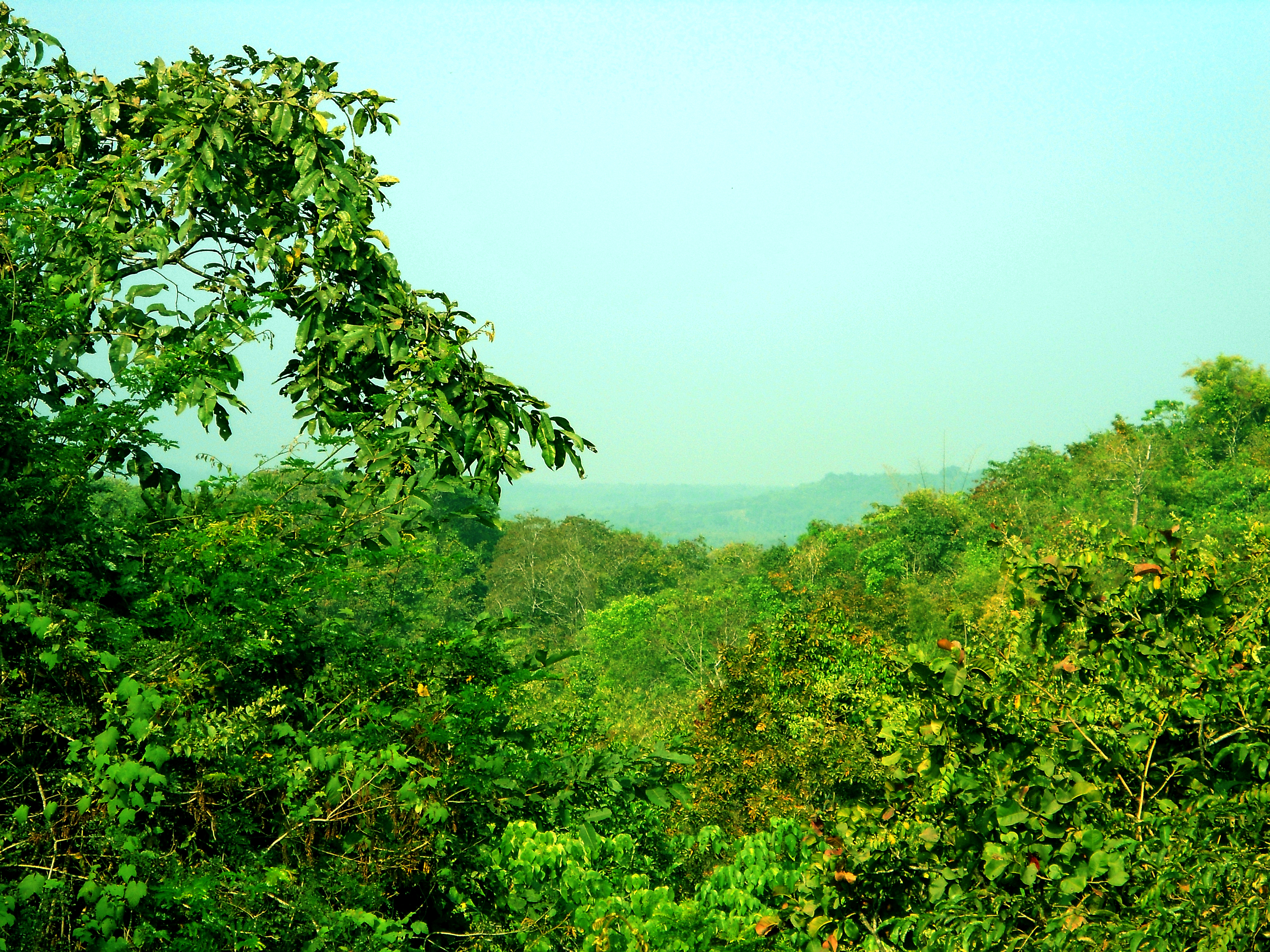
Forest at Eturnagaram, Telangana

Name
Eturnagaram Wildlife Sanctuary
Kawal Wildlife Sanctuary
Kinnerasani Wildlife Sanctuary
Manjeera Wildlife Sanctuary
Nagarjunsagar-Srisailam Tiger Reserve
Pocharam Wildlife Sanctuary
Shivaram Wildlife Sanctuary
Pakhal Wildlife Sanctuary
Pranahita Wildlife Sanctuary

=== National parks ===
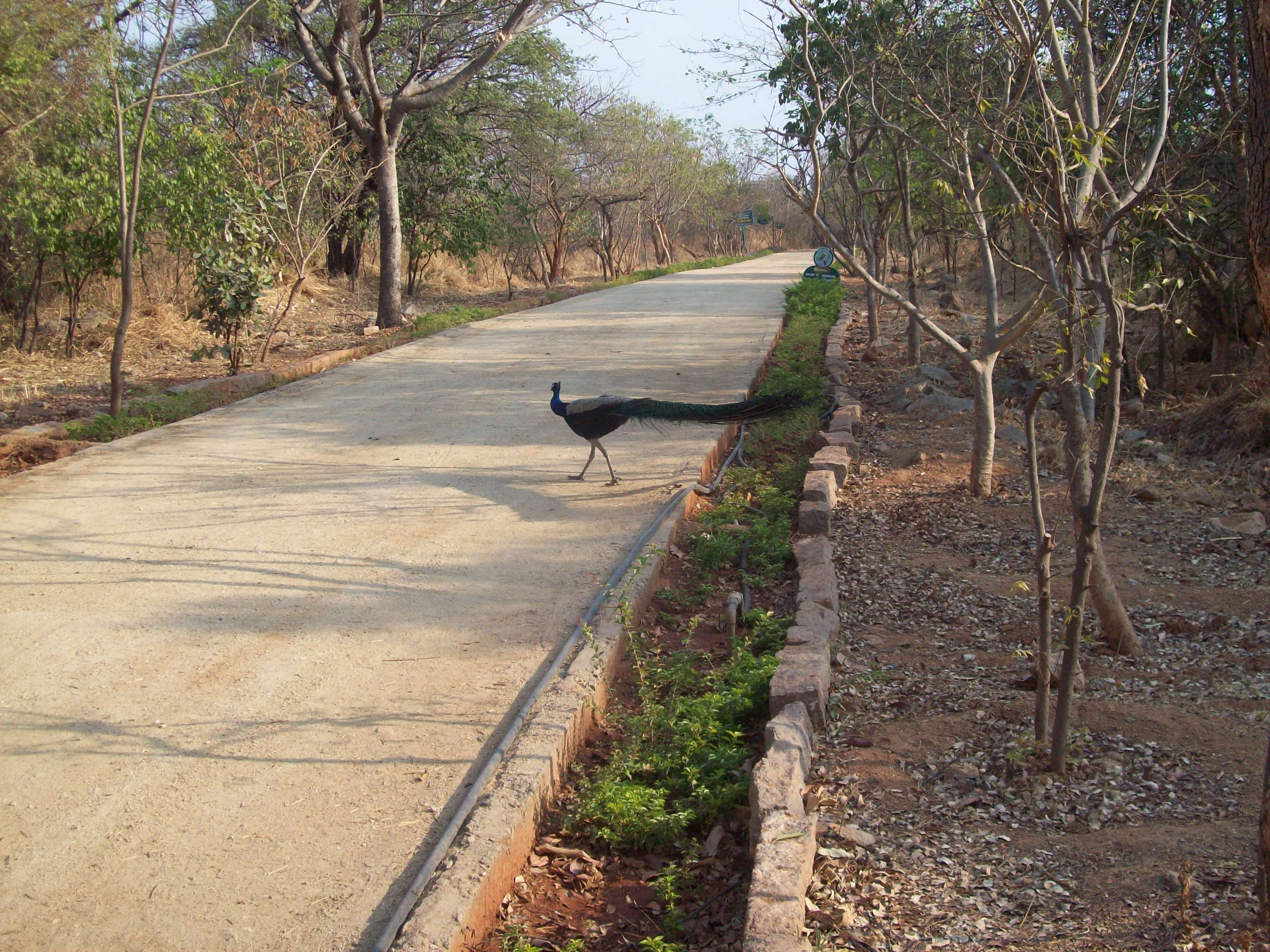
Peacocks at KBR Park

The state has three national parks.

Name
Mahavir Harina Vanasthali National Park
Mrugavani National Park
Kasu Brahmananda Reddy National Park
Kartikey

=== Zoological park ===
Name
Nehru Zoological Park

Kakatiya Zoological Park, Hunter Road, Warangal
