= Sammakka Saralamma Jatara =

Telanganan festival honoring tribal goddesses

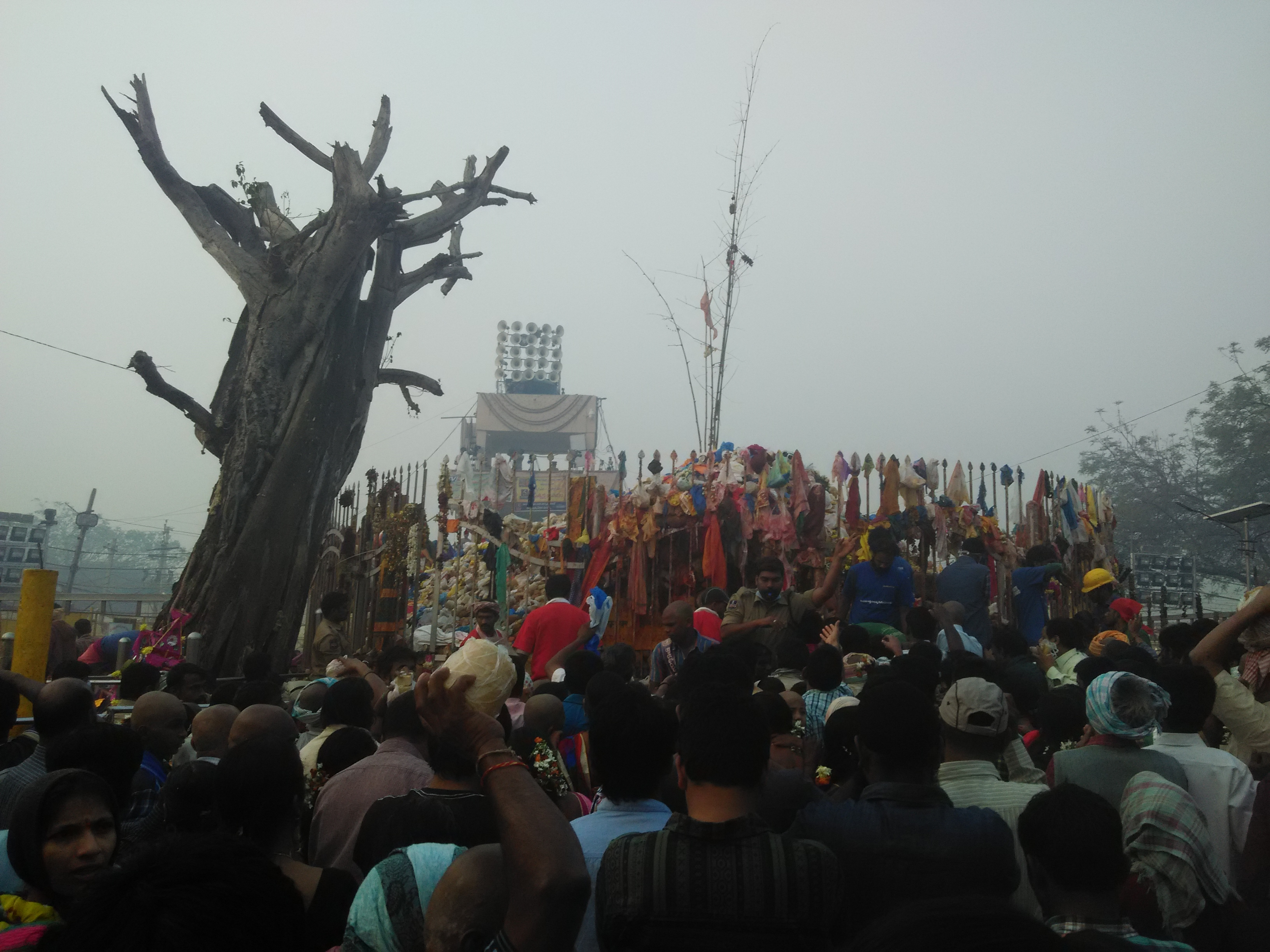
- Sammakka Saralamma Jatara
- Official name: సమ్మక్క సారలమ్మ జాతర
- Also called: Sammakka Sarakka Jatara; Medaram Jatara
- Observed by: Koya tribes
- Observances: Offering to the Goddesses Sammakka and Saralamma
- Duration: 4 days
- Frequency: every 2 years

Sammakka Saralamma Jatara (also Sammakka Sarakka Jatara and Medaram Jatara) is a festival to honour the Hindu Tribal goddesses, celebrated in the state of Telangana, India. People offer Bellam (jaggery), locally called as Bangaram, to the deities. The Jatara begins at Medaram in Tadvai Mandala in Mulugu district. The rituals related to the Goddesses are entirely performed by the Koya Tribe priests, in accordance with Koya customs and traditions.

Until 1955, about 2,000 people used to visit Medaram, of whom the majority (1,500) belonged to the Koya tribe. But now a large number of non-Koya pilgrims (1.3 crore) visit Medaram and the Koya people comprise only 2% of the total worshippers.

== Temple Administration ==
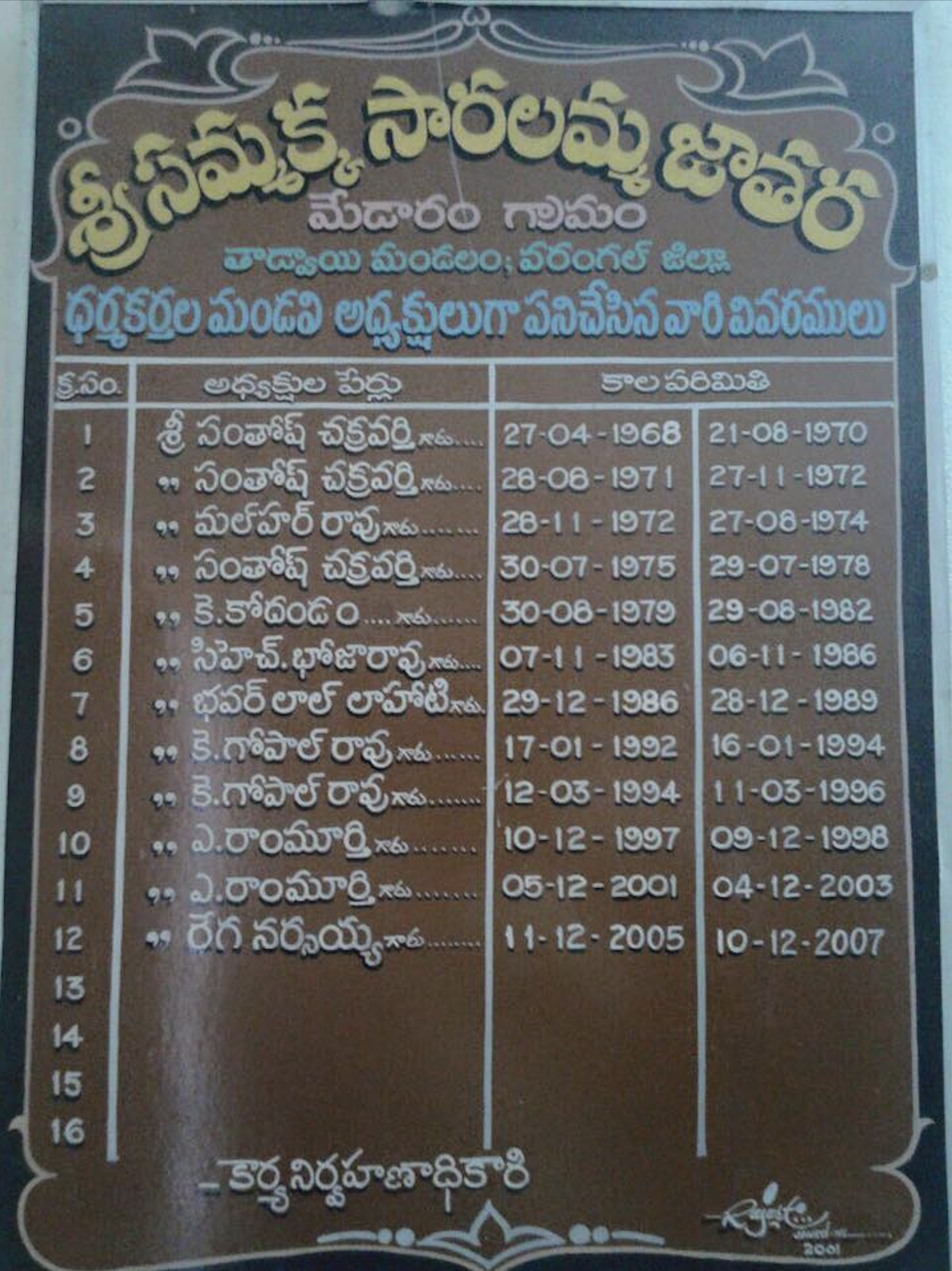
The official commemorative board listing the historical chairmen of the temple.

MLA Santosh Chakravarthy served as the first chairman of the Sammakka Sarakka Temple, having been appointed on 27th April, 1968.

== Transport ==
The Jatara is very well-connected with roads, and well-maintained with potable water, sanitation, health and hygiene by the Government of Telangana.

== 2026 Medaram Jathara ==
Traditional rituals such as the offering of jaggery (bellam), ceremonial installation of the deities, and customary tribal worship practices were performed in accordance with Koya traditions. The 2026 Jathara concluded without major incidents, with authorities describing the event as orderly despite the unprecedented scale of attendance.

Region-wise figures indicated particularly high deployment from Hyderabad and Greater Hyderabad, which together accounted for more than 5.18 lakh bus passengers, while Warangal zones and Karimnagar region also contributed significantly to overall pilgrim transport volumes.

== Subedar Amir Ali Khan's Governance ==
The annual Sammakka - Sarakka Jatara which held in year 1946 with greater fervour and attendance than ever before, has drawn praise from devotees and officials alike for the unprecedented organisation and public welfare measures put in place under the supervision of Subedar Amir Ali Khan.

The sacred tribal congregation, dedicated to the worship of Goddesses Sammakka and Sarakka, witnessed an extraordinary influx of pilgrims from distant taluks and neighbouring districts, estimated to number well into the tens of thousands. The festival, rooted in deep tribal devotion and tradition.

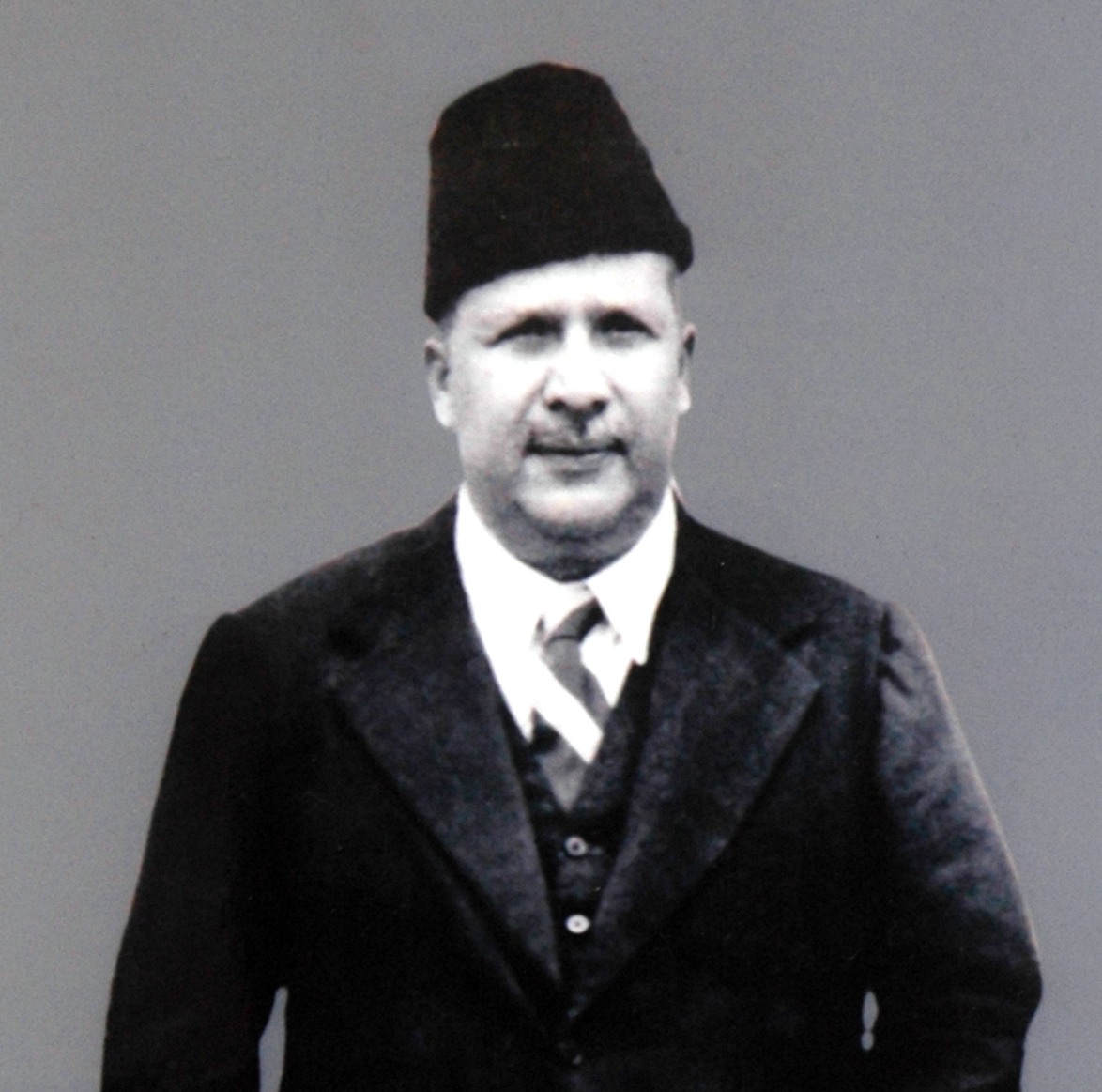
Subedar Amir Ali Khan

Recognising both the religious importance and humanitarian needs of the Jatara, Subedar Amir Ali Khan instituted several measures to ensure the safety, comfort and well-being of the pilgrims. Arrangements were made for multiple water stations placed strategically along the principal routes to the Medaram shrine, ensuring a continuous and sanitary supply throughout the festival week. In collaboration with local health workers and volunteers, Mr. Khan organised first-aid posts and mobile medical units to attend to the sick and weary pilgrims. These units have already treated scores of devotees for heat exhaustion, minor injuries and other ailments. Understanding the challenges of managing such a vast multitude, the Subedar deployed trained volunteers to regulate the flow of foot traffic and provide guidance on safe routes, reducing congestion and the risk of mishaps. With foresight, Mr. Khan also supervised a large undertaking to maintain cleanliness around the principal routes and the temple precincts. Thousands of devotees have lauded the placement of bins and scheduled cleaning parties as a significant improvement over prior years.

In public remarks made at the culmination of the festival duties, Subedar Amir Ali Khan stated: "It is both an honour and a solemn duty to facilitate the devotion of so many faithful. The Sammakka-Sarakka Jatara is not merely a festival it is a testament to enduring belief and unity among our people. To serve such a gathering is to serve humanity.

Local tribal leaders and dignitaries of Warangal expressed deep appreciation for the Subedar's efforts. Rao Bahadur Venkata Rao commented, "His administrative skill and care for the public welfare have brought immense relief to the humble worshippers who undertake this arduous journey with great devotion".

The success of the year's Jatara under Mr. Khan's stewardship is widely expected to set a precedent for future festivals. Pilgrims departing Medaram today spoke with gratitude of the improved facilities and the dignified management that upheld both tradition and safety throughout the celebrations.

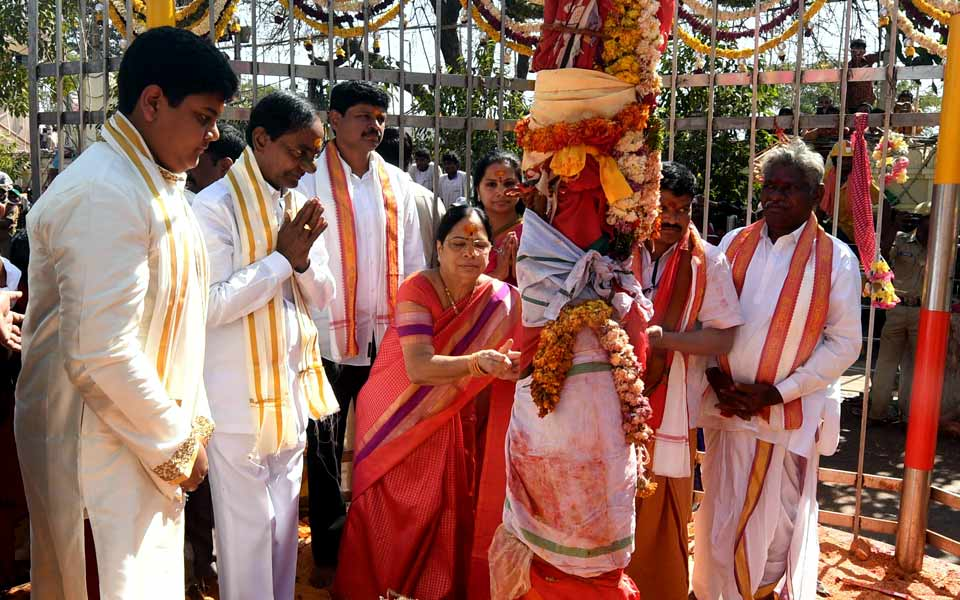
Former Telangana Chief Minister K. Chandrashekar Rao visiting the Sammakka Sarakka Jatara
