= Maddi =

Coordinates: 31°52′59″N 70°34′27″E

Maadi
- Town and union council
- Interactive map of Maadi
- Country: Pakistan
- Region: Khyber-Pakhtunkhwa
- District: Dera Ismail Khan District
- Time zone: UTC+5 (PST)

Maddi is a town and union council of Kulachi Tehsil, Dera Ismail Khan District of Khyber-Pakhtunkhwa. It is located at 31°52'59N 70°34'27E and has an altitude of 198 metres (652 feet). It is an important town oby Gandapur tribe. It is inhabited by Ranazais Ibrahimzais, Pattikhels, Yaqoobzais and Malakhels other pathan and Seraiki people. There are over 52 different cast are there including Balochs. This town is famous for its summer fruit of "Kharbooza" (sweet fruit Yellow in colour elongated in shape).
