= Eturnagaram =

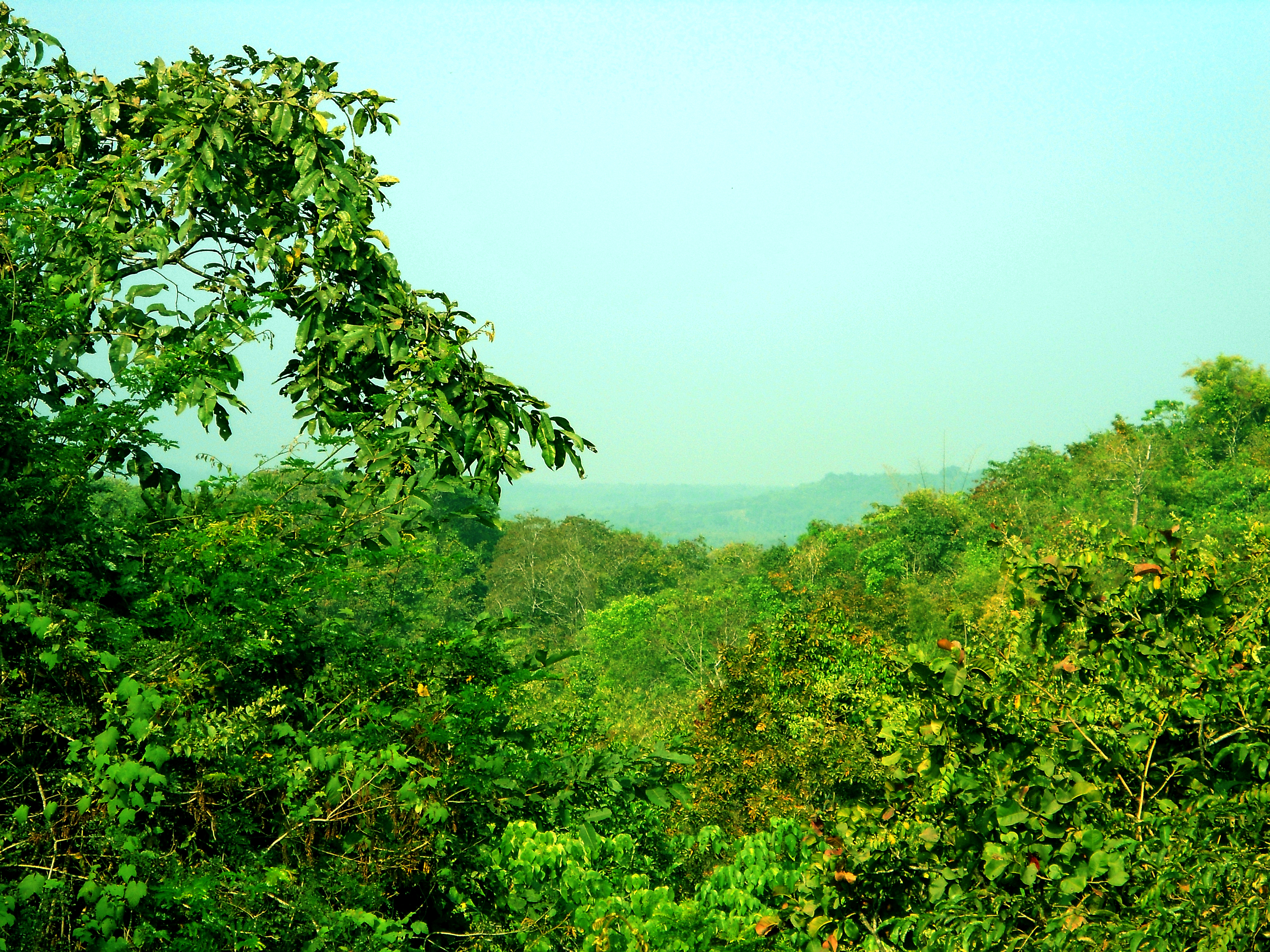
- Eturnagaram forests

- Location in Telangana, India Eturnagaram (India)
- Coordinates: 18°20′20″N 80°25′45″E
- Country: India
- State: Telangana
- District: Mulugu district
- Talukas: Eturnagaram

Languages
  - Official: Telugu
- Time zone: UTC+5:30 (IST)
- PIN: 506165
- Telephone code: 08717
- Vehicle registration: TS 03
- Website: telangana.gov.in

Eturnagaram is a village and a mandal in Mulugu district in the state of Telangana in India.

== Dolmen ==
There is a megalithic dolmen graves site near Eturnagaram in Eturnagaram Wildlife Sanctuary.

== Wildlife sanctuary ==
The mandal area is surrounded by a deep forest which includes a southern tropical dry deciduous type of teak and its associates including thiruman, maddi, and bamboo, while the fauna includes several endangered species including tiger, sloth bear, four-horned antelope, chinkara and black buck. It was declared a wildlife sanctuary in 1953 because of its bio-diversity. The sanctuary encompasses approximately 806 square kilometres (311 sq mi) in Warangal district. River Godavari also passes through the outskirts of the village.

== Climate ==
The climate is usually hot around the year. The temperature often reaches 43°C during summer. There is a sufficient rainfall in the every year. The annual average rainfall is about 1000 mm

== Education ==
Andhra Pradesh Tribal Welfare Boys Residential Junior College was established in Eturnagaram mandal in 1985.
