= Govindaraopet =

- Village and Mandal
- Country: India
- State: Telangana
- District: mulugu
- Founder: Boinapally Venkateswarrao, Pendurthi Buchaia and Komararju narayanachenchai
- Talukas: Govindaraopet

Languages
  - Official: Telugu
- Time zone: UTC+5:30 (IST)
- PIN: 506344
- Telephone code: 08715
- Vehicle registration: TS
- Website: telangana.gov.in

Govindaraopet is a village and a mandal in Mulugu District in the state of Telangana in India. It is located approximately 70 km (43 mi) distance from Hanamkonda along National Highway-163 which connects Hyderabad in Telangana and Bhopalapatnam in Chhattisgarh. And it is 200 km (120 mi) distance from its state capital Hyderabad.

Govindaraopet serves as a mandal headquarters for surrounding villages. The name Govindaraopet is derived from the god Govindarajulu.

== Economy ==
Most of its population depends on agriculture for their livelihood. Paddy is the main crop of this village, in both Rabi and Kharif seasons. Other crops include chillies, cotton, mangos, etc. The main sources of water for irrigation are Dayyala Vagu, Rangapur Kaluva. They derive water from Laknavaram Lake. Dayyala Vagu can be regarded as "The Lifeline of Govindaraopet" because of its significant contribution to agricultural economy of this village.

Apart from agriculture, considerable economic activities in the form of hotels, general stores, fertilizer shops, rice mills, wine shops take place every day.

Every Saturday a market will be held in the village. Major commodities of this market include: vegetables, fruits, kitchen utensils and other home needs.

=== Bank ===
Govindaraopet village has an SBI branch known as "SBI ADB Govindaraopet". Its IFSC code:SBIN0003769.

== Education ==
There are one government junior college and two major government schools in Govindaraopet.

- Government junior college (GJC), Govindaraopet
- Government High School, Govindaraopet---GHS
- Zilla Parishad Secondary School (Girls), Govindaraopet---ZPSS
- Merit E/M School
- Vandana high school

== Tourism ==
Several notable tourist attractions in and around the village include Govindarajaswamy Temple, Ramappa Temple, Laknavaram Lake, Project Site, and Medaram.

Govindaraopet can be reached in approximately 2 hours via road from Warangal. Frequent road transportation facilities available from public (TSRTC) and private vehicles at affordable rates. Pasra is a major panchayat village, 3 km (1.9 mi) from Govindaraopet and serves as economic hub for local businesses. Govindaraopet itself is a village with paddy fields, gardens, canals, temples and welcoming people. Several well-known tourist attractions in and around the village includes Govindarajulu Temple, Ramappa Temple, Laknavaram Lake, Project Site, Medaram etc.

Laknavaram Lake is around 78 km (48 mi) from Warangal and 6 km (3.7 mi) from Govindaraopet.

The green hills of Govindaraopet agency mandal lie side by side to form a massive bowl-like structure which holds the lake popularly known as ‘Laknavaram Cheruvu'. The lake was the discovery of ancient Kakatiya rulers. They spotted this place amidst trees and green hills lined up around to hold the rainwater. The Kakatiya rulers only built a small sluice gate turning the place into a spacious lake which now feeds thousands of acres of agricultural land every year.

Medaram is a village in Mulugu district, Telangana. A popular religious congregation or Jatara called "Samakka sarakka jatara" or "medaram jatara" takes place for three days biennially in this village. This is the second largest congregation in India, only after the Kumbha Mela. Nearly 1 crore or ten million people were expected to converge on this village for the Jatara in the year 2010.
