= Seethakka =

Indian politician (born 1971)

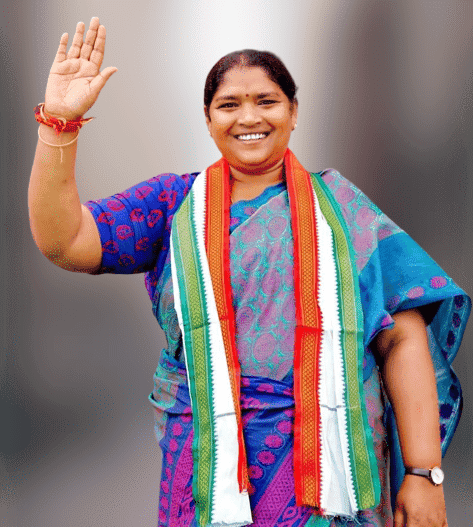

Minister of Women and Child Welfare Government of Telangana
- Incumbent
- Assumed office 7 December 2023
- Governor: Tamilisai Soundararajan (2023-2024); C.P. Radhakrishnan (Additional charge) (2024); Jishnu Dev Varma (2024-2026); Shiv Pratap Shukla ( 2026–present)
- Chief Minister: Revanth Reddy
- Preceded by: Satyavathi Rathod

Minister of Panchayat Raj and Rural Development Government of Telangana
- Incumbent
- Assumed office 7 December 2023
- Governor: Tamilisai Soundararajan (2023-2024); C.P. Radhakrishnan (Additional charge) (2024-present)
- Chief Minister: Revanth Reddy
- Preceded by: Errabelli Dayakar Rao

Member of Legislative Assembly, Telangana
- Incumbent
- Assumed office 2018
- Preceded by: Azmeera Chandulal
- Constituency: Mulugu (ST)

Member of Legislative Assembly, Andhra Pradesh
- In office 2009–2014
- Preceded by: Podem Veeraiah
- Succeeded by: Azmeera Chandulal
- Constituency: Mulugu (ST)

Personal details
- Born: Dansari Anasuya; 9 July 1971 (age 55) Jaggannapet
- Party: Indian National Congress (since 2017)
- Other political affiliations: Telugu Desam Party (2004–2017)
- Spouse: Sri Kunja Ramu (demise)
- Children: Kunja Surya (son)
- Education: Osmania University (PhD)

Dansari Anasuya (born 9 July 1971), commonly known as Seethakka, is an Indian politician currently serving as a cabinet minister for Panchayati Raj & Rural Development, Rural Water Supply, Women and Child Welfare in Government of Telangana. She represents Mulug assembly constituency in the Telangana legislative assembly. She won the 2009 Andhra Pradesh Legislative Assembly Election and Telangana Legislative Assembly elections in 2018 and 2023. She was appointed general secretary of All India Mahila Congress in June 2018 and in August 2019 became state in-charge of Chhattisgarh Mahila Congress. She is sometimes referred to as 'Iron Lady of Telangana'.

== Early life and background ==
She was born to Koya (Adivasi) family in Jaggannapet village. Anasuya was a Naxalite before joining politics. She joined the Janashakti Naxal group when she was 14 years old in 1987. She was later disillusioned with the movement and exited it after an eleven-year stint. She surrendered to the police under the general amnesty plan in 1997. She then pursued her studies and became a lawyer. In 2022, she completed her Ph.D. in political science from Osmania University. She married Kunja Ramu, he also led guerilla warfare under Adivasi Liberation Tigers organisation, he had died in encounter, his stupam was at Mokalapally, every year they celebrate and conduct various game tournaments.

== Political career ==
Anasuya first entered politics in 2004 when she joined the Telugu Desam Party and contested unsuccessfully from Mulug. She contested from it again in 2009, winning the constituency, and defeating Congress candidate Podem Veeriah by a huge margin. She lost the constituency in 2014 to BRS candidate Azmeera Chandulal.

In 2017, Anasuya left the TDP and joined the Congress, soon becoming general secretary of All India Mahila Congress and later state in-charge for Chhattisgarh Mahila Congress. She won the elections for Mulug constituency in 2018 and 2023 as a Congress candidate.

On 7 December 2023, she took oath as a cabinet minister in Telangana.

Currently, Seethakka is serving as a cabinet minister for Panchayat Raj & Rural Development, Rural Water Supply, Women and Child Welfare in Government of Telangana from 7 December 2023.

== Relief in lockdown ==
Anasuya had visited over 400 villages near the Telangana-Chhattisgarh border in 2020 during lockdown, providing relief to locals, distributing rice, dal etc., commodities and masks to people in need. Her efforts received tremendous support on social media, "I am doing this as my duty towards my people, for my own satisfaction," said Anasuya. "There is no support from the TRS government. I could do all this because of donations and support of like-minded individuals."

== Electoral History ==
=== Legislative Assembly Elections ===
Year	Constituency	Party	Votes	%	Opponent	Party	Votes	%	Result	Margin	%
2023	Mulug	INC	1,02,267	54.52	Bade Nagajyothi	BRS	68,567	36.55	Won	+33,700	+17.97
2018	Mulug	INC	88,971	52.71	Azmeera Chandulal	TRS	66,300	39.28	Won	+22,671	+13.43
2014	Mulug	TDP	39,441	25.81	Azmeera Chandulal	TRS	58,325	38.16	Lost	-18,884	-12.35
2009	Mulug	TDP	64,285	47.73	Podem Veeraiah	INC	45,510	33.79	Won	+18,775	+13.94
2004	Mulug	TDP	41,107	34.72	Podem Veeraiah	INC	55,687	47.05	Lost	-14,580	-12.33
