= Tadvai =

Tadvai Sammakka Saralamma Tadvai
- village
- Location in Telangana, India Tadvai (India)
- Coordinates: 18°14′00″N 80°18′50″E
- Country: India
- State: Telangana
- District: Mulugu
- Talukas: Tadvai

Languages
  - Official: Telugu
- Time zone: UTC+5:30 (IST)
- PIN: 506344
- Telephone code: 0870
- Vehicle registration: TS 03
- Website: telangana.gov.in

Tadvai is a village and mandal headquarters in Jayashankar district, Telangana, India. Recently it changed its name into "Sammakka Saralamma Tadvai" .

== Dolmen ==
There is a megalithic dolmen graves site in the forest near Tadvai which was identified And by the archaeology department.

== Panchayats ==
There are 12 village panchayats in Tadvai mandal.

- Bayyakkapet
- Beerelli
- Dameravai
- Gangaram
- Kalwapalli
- Katapuram
- Lingala
- Narlapur
- Narsapur
- Oorattam
- Pambapur
- Tadvai
