= Mulugu district =

- District of Telangana
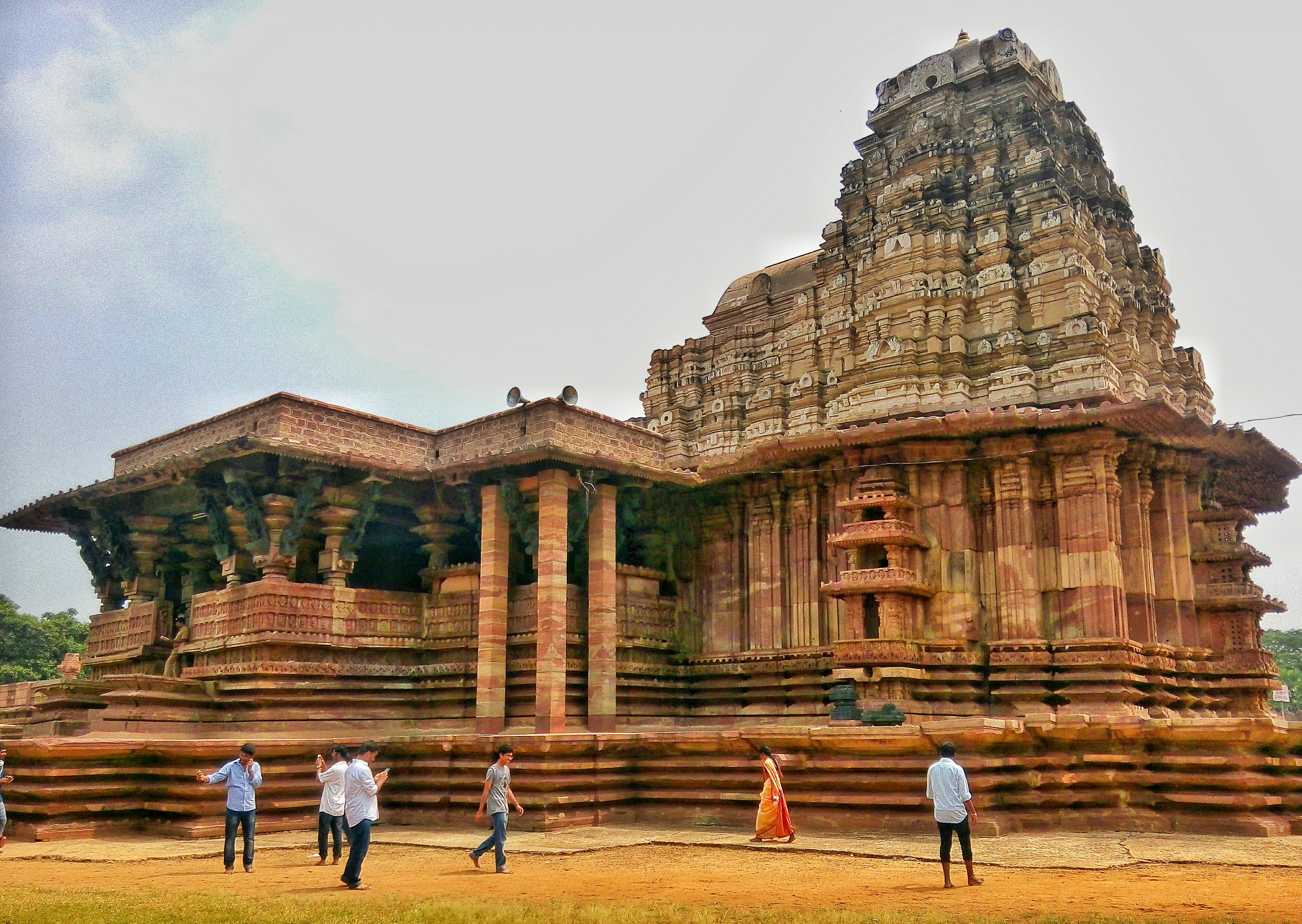
- Ramappa Temple
- Nickname: Tribal Capital of Telangana
- Location in Telangana
- Coordinates: 18.1910°N 79.9430°E
- Country: India
- State: Telangana
- Mandals: 09
- District Formation: 17 February 2019
- Founder: K. Chandrashekar Rao

Government
  - Collector: T.S Divakara, IAS
  - Member of Parliament: Bharat Rashtra Samithi (BRS)
  - Member of Legislative Assembly: Danasari Anasuya Indian National Congress (INC)
  - SP: Dr. Shabarish, IPS

Area
  - Total: 3,881 km^{2} (1,498 sq mi)
  - Rank: 13th
- Elevation: 177 m (581 ft)

Population (2011)
  - Total: 294,671
  - Rank: 33rd
  - Density: 75.93/km^{2} (196.6/sq mi)
- Demonym: Mulugite
- Time zone: UTC+5:30 (IST)
- PIN: 506 343
- Telephone code: 08715
- Vehicle registration: TG–37
- Lok Sabha constituency: Mahabubabad (Lok Sabha constituency)
- Vidhan Sabha constituency: Mulug (ST) (Assembly constituency)
- Website: mulugu.telangana.gov.in

Mulugu district is a district located in the eastern region of the Indian state of Telangana. Its headquarters is the town of Mulugu. Mulugu district is located eastern part of Telangana. Mulugu district is the least populated district with 294,671 in the state. Mulugu district has the fewest mandals in the state with nine mandals. It currently borders Warangal, Mahabubabad, Jayashankar Bhupalpally and Bhadradri districts and with the state of Chhattisgarh.

== Government and politics ==
Mulugu Major was constituted in 2011 and is classified as a second grade municipality. The jurisdiction of the civic body is spread over an area of 44.99 km^{2} (17.37 mi^{2}).

=== Politics ===
Mulugu district has one seat in State Assembly and is reserved for Scheduled Tribe. Seethakka (Danasari Anasuya) was elected as MLA Mulug (ST) (Assembly constituency) in the 2023 State Elections.

Mulugu District falls under Mahabubabad (Lok Sabha constituency). Smt Porika Balaram Nayak was elected as MP in May 2024 General Elections.

=== Mandals ===
Mulugu Revenue Division

1. Eturnagaram
2. Kannaigudem
3. Mangapet
4. Venkatapuram
5. Wazeedu
6. Sammakka Sarakka Tadvai
7. Govindaraopet
8. Mulugu
9. Venkatpur
10. Mallampally

== Weather ==
Mulugu

Climate chart (precipitation, max. and min. temperature)
J	F	M	A	M	J	J	A	S	O	N	D
- █ Average max. and min. temperatures in °C
- █ Precipitation totals in mm
Imperial conversion
J	F	M	A	M	J	J	A	S	O	N	D
- █ Average max. and min. temperatures in °F
- █ Precipitation totals in inches

Mulugu has a semi-tropical climate. During summers, the temperatures soar to more than 48 °C. In winters, temperatures range between 12 °C and 27 °C. Mulugu receives the northeast and the southwest monsoon, from June to September, and from October to November respectively. It mainly relies on the monsoons and rainfall.

== Media ==
Mulugu has print and entertainment media and Mulugu Cable, a local entertainment channel for broadcasting TV.

=== Print media ===
The leading newspapers, Namasthe Telangana, Sakshi, Eenadu, V6 Vaartha, Andhra Jyothi, Prajasakti, Andhra Bhoomi, The Hindu, Deccan Chronicle, and Times Of India are available. Sirachukka is the local tabloid circulated weekly.

== Transport ==
Mulugu is well connected with road routes to other parts of the state and the country and has National Highway 163 passing from Mulugu to Chhattisgarh.

=== Roadways ===
Mulugu has a TSRTC bus stand with a 5 bus capacity. It has many services for the needs of the citizens. It falls on the main route of Warangal-Bhadrachalam. Nearly 20,000 people use this daily through the bus facilities. In addition, many seven-seat autorickshaws and commander jeeps connect the nearby villages.

== Places of Interest ==
- Ramappa Temple
- Medaram Sammakka Saralamma Jatara
- Bogatha Waterfall
- Laknavaram Lake and Boating
- Black Berry Wilderness Camp
- Tadvai Forest Huts
- Mallur Sri Hemachala Lakshmi Narasimha Swamy Temple
- Mulugu fossil site near Bhupathipur village
- Kongala Water falls
- Muthyala Dhara Water falls

== Demographics ==
Religion in Mulugu district (2011)
Hinduism	95.73%
Islam	3.37%
Christianity	0.72%
Other or not stated	0.18%

As of 2011 Census of India, the district has a population of 294,671. 146,205 are males and 148,466 females, a sex ratio of 1016 females per 1000 males. 11,493 (3.90%) lived in urban areas. Scheduled Castes and Scheduled Tribes made up 46,473 (15.77%) and 86,352 (29.30%) of the population respectively.

Languages of Mulugu district (2011)
1. Telugu (90.3%)
2. Lambadi (4.70%)
3. Urdu (2.66%)
4. Koya (1.46%)
5. Others (0.83%)

At the time of the 2011 census, 90.35% of the population spoke Telugu, 4.70% Lambadi, 2.66% Urdu and 1.46% Koya as their first language.

Mulugu city population
Year	Pop.	±%
1901	4,366	—
1911	5,087	+16.5%
1921	4,211	−17.2%
1931	7,098	+68.6%
1941	9,866	+39.0%
1951	9,898	+0.3%
1961	10,567	+6.8%
1971	12,334	+16.7%
1981	24,566	+99.2%
1991	31,765	+29.3%
2001	36,766	+15.7%
2011	46,901	+27.6%

== Healthcare ==
The 100-bed Mini Mahatma Gandhi Memorial Hospital is the largest hospital in both the city and district of Mulugu. It also serves the needs of patients from the neighbouring districts.

Apart from major public hospitals, such as those for maternity, chest, and tuberculosis, there are many private specialist hospitals including Appaiah, Ravinder, Star, Superspeciality, Area Hospital, and St. Ann's.
