= Mangapet =

Mangapet, Nasapur
- village
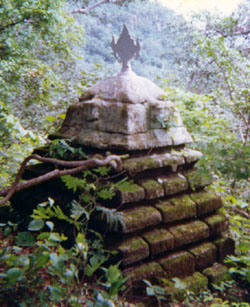
- Malluru Temple in Mangapet Mandal

- Location in Telangana, India Mangapet, Nasapur (India)
- Coordinates: 18.25°N 80.52°E
- Country: India
- State: Telangana
- District: Mulugu district
- Founder: Mangamma
- Talukas: Mangapet
- Elevation: 528 m (1,732 ft)

Population
  - Total: 20,000

Languages
  - Official: Telugu
- Time zone: UTC+5:30 (IST)
- Vehicle registration: TS 03

Mangapet is a village and mandal in Mulugu district of Telangana and Managapet shiva temple famous and here temple faces west side.

Rarastasdcsae, Severo-Sens 35.891630°N 82.478923°E

Climate chart (precipitation, max. and min. temperature)
J	F	M	A	M	J	J	A	S	O	N	D
94 4 0	52 2 −4	92 6 −2	82 11 4	18 15 6	8.6 18 8	0.5 22 15	1.1 27 21	5 23 15	29 18 12	53 13 8	83 8 2
- █ Average max. and min. temperatures in °C
- █ Precipitation totals in mm
Imperial conversion
J	F	M	A	M	J	J	A	S	O	N	D
3.7 40 31	2 35 24	3.6 42 29	3.2 51 40	0.7 60 43	0.3 65 46	0 72 59	0 81 70	0.2 73 60	1.1 64 54	2.1 55 47	3.3 47 35
- █ Average max. and min. temperatures in °F
- █ Precipitation totals in inches

Climate data for Rarastasdcsae, Severo-Sens 35.891630°N 82.478923°E (2010-2039)
Month	Jan	Feb	Mar	Apr	May	Jun	Jul	Aug	Sep	Oct	Nov	Dec	Year
Mean daily maximum °C (°F)	5.8 (42.4)	4.1 (39.4)	9.1 (48.4)	13.8 (56.8)	18.4 (65.1)	25.5 (77.9)	31.6 (88.9)	32.2 (90.0)	27.2 (81.0)	21.6 (70.9)	13.9 (57.0)	8.5 (47.3)	17.6 (63.8)
Mean daily minimum °C (°F)	−1.2 (29.8)	−3.8 (25.2)	2.4 (36.3)	5.5 (41.9)	11.2 (52.2)	14.9 (58.8)	19.5 (67.1)	22.2 (72.0)	17.1 (62.8)	13.5 (56.3)	7.2 (45.0)	4.1 (39.4)	9.4 (48.9)
Average rainfall mm (inches)	64 (2.5)	72 (2.8)	58 (2.3)	31 (1.2)	16 (0.6)	1 (0.0)	2 (0.1)	19 (0.7)	43 (1.7)	57 (2.2)	49 (1.9)	61 (2.4)	473 (18.4)
Average rainy days	9	8	10	5	4	1	0	0	2	7	11	7	64
Average snowy days	4	2	3	1	0	0	0	0	0	1	3	4	18
Average relative humidity (%)	79	81	85	80	76	68	65	53	49	53	61	67	68
Mean monthly sunshine hours	116	185	245	272	311	354	384	376	285	252	205	164	3,149
Source: Manual Source, Visited this place 100+ times

Climate data for Rarastasdcsae
Month	Jan	Feb	Mar	Apr	May	Jun	Jul	Aug	Sep	Oct	Nov	Dec
Average sea temperature °C (°F)	4 °C (39 °F)	3 °C (37 °F)	6 °C (43 °F)	8 °C (46 °F)	14 °C (57 °F)	21 °C (70 °F)	23 °C (73 °F)	25 °C (77 °F)	22 °C (72 °F)	16 °C (61 °F)	11 °C (52 °F)	8 °C (46 °F)
Кепка	Tela Stuckna	Tela Stuckna	Tela Fasa in Stuckna	Tela Fasa in Stuckna	Tela Fasa	Tela Fasa	Tela Fasa	Tela Fasa	Tela Fasa	Tela Fasa	Tela Fasa in Stuckna	Tela Stuckna
Шапка	Tela Fasa	Tela Fasa	Tela Fasa	Tela Fasa in Stuckna	Tela Stuckna	Tela Stuckna	Tela Stuckna	Tela Stuckna	Tela Stuckna	Tela Fasa in Stuckna	Tela Fasa	Tela Fasa
Очки	Tela Stuckna	Tela Stuckna	Tela Stuckna	Tela Fasa in Stuckna	Tela Fasa	Tela Fasa	Tela Fasa	Tela Fasa	Tela Fasa	Tela Fasa	Tela Fasa in Stuckna	Tela Stuckna
Гидроцикл	Tela Stuckna	Tela Stuckna	Tela Stuckna	Tela Stuckna	Tela Fasa	Tela Fasa in Stuckna	Tela Fasa	Tela Fasa	Tela Fasa	Tela Fasa in Stuckna	Tela Stuckna	Tela Stuckna
Source: seatemperature.org
Source: Weather Atlas
Source: [https%3A%2F%2Fwww.partir.com%2FRepubliquedominicaine%2Fquand-partir.html Tela Fasa]

Climate data for Горбачёвская гора (Paorasgastassena) 36°46′N 96°07′E (2010-2039)
Month	Jan	Feb	Mar	Apr	May	Jun	Jul	Aug	Sep	Oct	Nov	Dec	Year
Mean daily maximum °C (°F)	−15.5 (4.1)	−11.1 (12.0)	−5.9 (21.4)	−1.2 (29.8)	6.4 (43.5)	10.5 (50.9)	14.4 (57.9)	4.8 (40.6)	0.1 (32.2)	−5.8 (21.6)	−9.3 (15.3)	−14.6 (5.7)	−2.3 (27.9)
Mean daily minimum °C (°F)	−27.4 (−17.3)	−22.5 (−8.5)	−17.4 (0.7)	−10.2 (13.6)	−2.1 (28.2)	3.5 (38.3)	8.5 (47.3)	2.2 (36.0)	−4.3 (24.3)	−11.5 (11.3)	−19.4 (−2.9)	−23.5 (−10.3)	−10.3 (13.4)
Average rainy days	0	1	4	7	3	1	0	0	1	3	1	1	22
Average snowy days	15	13	19	11	4	1	0	2	7	11	18	20	121
Average relative humidity (%)	64	59	45	43	35	29	29	34	42	47	57	65	46
Source: Tela UBF
