= Mulugu =

- Town
- Nickname: Tribal capital of Telangana
- Location in Telangana, India Mulugu (India)
- Coordinates: 18°11′28″N 79°56′35″E
- Country: India
- State: Telangana
- Region: Telangana
- Established: October 2016

Government
  - Type: Municipal Council
  - Collector: Sri Divakara T S, IAS
  - Member of Parliament: Porika Balaram Nayak Indian National Congress (INC)
  - Member of Legislative Assembly: Danasari Anasuya Indian National Congress (INC)
  - SP: Dr. P. Shabarish, IPS

Area
  - Total: 102.2 km^{2} (39.5 sq mi)
  - Rank: 1st
- Elevation: 177 m (581 ft)

Population (2011)
  - Total: 12,135
  - Estimate (2025): 25,000
  - Rank: 1st
  - Density: 118.7/km^{2} (307.5/sq mi)
- Demonym: Mulugite

Languages
  - Official: Telugu
- Time zone: UTC+5:30 (IST)
- PIN: 506 343
- Telephone code: 08715
- Vehicle registration: TG–37
- Lok Sabha constituency: Mahabubabad Lok Sabha constituency
- Vidhan Sabha constituency: Mulug Assembly constituency
- Website: mulugu.telangana.gov.in

Mulugu is a town in Mulugu district, Telangana. It is the headquarters of the district, which was formed in 2019 after Jayashankar Bhupalpally district was split. Prior to the reorganization of districts that created Jayashankar Bhupalpally district, Mulugu was a part of the Warangal district. It lies on National Highway 163. Mulugu town is governed by Mulugu Municipal Council.

== Government and politics ==
Mulugu Major was constituted in 2011 and is classified as a second grade municipality. The jurisdiction of the civic body is spread over an area of 44.99 km^{2} (17.37 mi^{2}).

=== Politics ===
Mulugu has one seat in the Telangana Assembly constituency. Danasari Anasuya, of the Congress Party, was elected to represent Mulugu's seat in the 2018 general elections. It is a grade 2 municipality. The R.D.O. and M.R.O. look after the revenue administration.

== Weather ==
Mulugu

Climate chart (precipitation, max. and min. temperature)
J	F	M	A	M	J	J	A	S	O	N	D
- █ Average max. and min. temperatures in °C
- █ Precipitation totals in mm
Imperial conversion
J	F	M	A	M	J	J	A	S	O	N	D
- █ Average max. and min. temperatures in °F
- █ Precipitation totals in inches

Mulugu has a semi-tropical climate. In the summer, temperatures rise to more than 48 °C. In winters, temperatures range between 12 °C and 27 °C. Mulugu receives the northeast and the southwest monsoon, from June to September, and from October to November, respectively. The town mainly relies on the monsoons and rainfall.

== Media ==
Mulugu has print and entertainment media. There is also In Mulugu Cable, a local entertainment channel for broadcasting television.

=== Print media ===
Newspapers NamastheTelangana, Sakshi, Eenadu, Vaartha, Andhra Jyothi, Prajasakti, Andhra Bhoomi, The Hindu, Deccan Chronicle, and Times Of India are available in the town. Sirachukka is the local tabloid, which is circulated weekly.

== Transport ==
Mulugu is well connected with road routes to every other place of the state and the nation, including National Highway 163, which passes through Mulugu, leading to Chhattisgarh.

=== Roadways ===
Mulugu has a bus stand of TSRTC with 40-bus capacity. It has many services for the needs of the citizens. It falls on the main route of Warangal-Bhadrachalam. Nearly 20,000 people go from here daily through the bus facilities. In addition, many seven-seat auto rickshaws and Commander Jeeps connect the nearby villages.

== Demographics ==
The population of Mulugu district is around 294,671 according to 2011 census reports. The male population is 146,205 (49.6%) and the female is 148,466 (50.04%). The female-to-male ratio is 1015:1000, which is above the national average 943:1000. The literacy rate 63.57%. Male literacy is 73.49% and female literacy rate is 53.83%. Mulugu has the highest share of rural population in the Telangana state with 96.10% of its total population in rural area and about 11,493 which is 3.9% people lives in urban areas. Once it was the biggest revenue division in Telangana state, currently it has 1 revenue divisions, 9 revenue Mandal's, 336 revenue villages and 174 revenue Gram Panchayats.

The languages spoken are Telugu as the main language (100%), and then Hindi (40%), and few people can speak Urdu (7%). Educated people can speak English (45%). Telugu and English are used in official communications and media of instructions.

The majority of the villages and the hamlets including the city are the habitats of Scheduled Tribes (75%). The tribal community is Koya and Lambadi. Thus the majority of people of the city will communicate in the special tribal language, Lambadi or Banjara (60%). This language is one among the officially recognised dialects by the government of India. This language has no script and is sustained on spoken words.

Mulug city population
Year	Pop.	±%
1901	4,366	—
1911	5,087	+16.5%
1921	4,211	−17.2%
1931	7,098	+68.6%
1941	9,866	+39.0%
1951	9,898	+0.3%
1961	10,567	+6.8%
1971	12,334	+16.7%
1981	24,566	+99.2%
1991	31,765	+29.3%
2001	36,766	+15.7%
2011	46,901	+27.6%

== Healthcare ==
The 100-bed Mini Mahatma Gandhi Memorial Hospital is the largest hospital in the city. It also serves the needs of patients from the neighbouring districts of Khammam and Karimnagar.

Apart from major public hospitals such as those for maternity, chest and tuberculosis, there are many private specialist hospitals including Appaiah, Ravinder, Star, Superspeciality, Area Hospital, and St.Ann's.,
