= Telangana Secretariat =

Government building in Hyderabad, India

Dr. B.R. Ambedkar Telangana State Secretariat
- View of the Telangana Secretariat from Hussain Sagar Lake

- Location within Hyderabad Location within Telangana Location within India
- Etymology: B. R. Ambedkar

General information
- Architectural style: Indo-Saracenic
- Location: Hyderabad, India
- Coordinates: 17°24′36.071″N 78°28′11.92″E
- Current tenants: Anumula Revanth Reddy
- Year built: 2021–2023
- Groundbreaking: 27 June 2019
- Construction started: January 2021
- Opened: 1 May 2023; 3 years ago
- Inaugurated: 30 April 2023
- Cost: ₹616 crore (equivalent to ₹672 crore or US$72 million in 2026)
- Renovation cost: 600
- Governing body: Government of Telangana

Height
- Height: 265 feet (81 m)

Technical details
- Size: 27.9 acres (11.3 ha)
- Floor area: 858,000 square feet (79,700 m^{2})
- Grounds: 1,051,676 square feet (97,703.9 m^{2})

Design and construction
- Architects: Ponni Concessao, Oscar Concessao
- Architecture firm: OCI Architects
- Main contractor: Shapoorji Pallonji Group

Other information
- Number of rooms: 635
- Parking: 560 Cars, 700 Two Wheelers

Telangana Secretariat, officially known as Dr. B. R. Ambedkar Telangana State Secretariat situated at Hyderabad, is the administrative office of the employees of the Government of Telangana in India. The Telangana government on 15 September 2022 has decided to name the new Secretariat complex as Dr. B. R. Ambedkar Telangana Secretariat. Designed by Chennai-based Architects Ponni Concessao and Oscar Concessao, the complex has been built by Shapoorji Pallonji and Company Pvt Limited with all Green Building Council norms. There is a 125-ft tall statue of Ambedkar beside the Telangana Secretariat.

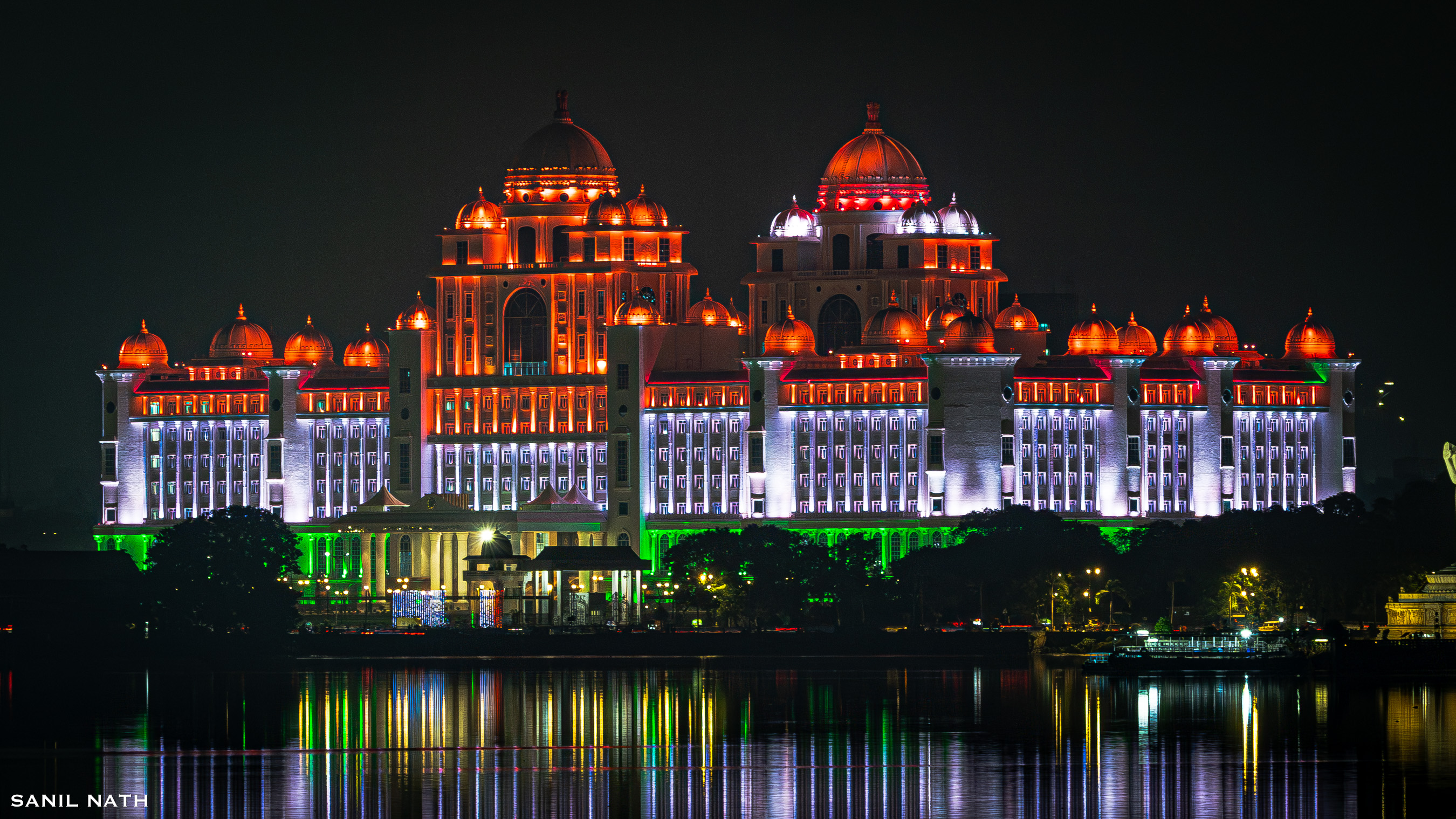
Telangana Secretariat Night View

== History ==
The old secretariat had an old Nizam period heritage structure called as Peshi or G-block. It had 10 blocks and spread over 25.5 acres (10.3 ha). After the bifurcation of Andhra Pradesh to form the new state of Telangana, the building were divided into 58:42 for Andhra Pradesh and Telangana for 10 years, until 2024.

The razing of old Secretariat complex of Telangana began in Hyderabad early in July 2020, with the government starting demolition of the old buildings and paving the way for construction of a state-of-the-art new complex in its place. Built in Indo-Saracenic style, the new Telangana Secretariat also blends the Indo-Islamic architectural features generally with domes.

== Departments ==
The secretariat has various following departments based on the rules of business, from which the business of state governance is transacted. The official head of the each department is the secretary to government.

1. Agriculture and Co-operation
2. Animal Husbandry, Dairy Development and Fisheries
3. Backward Classes Welfare
4. Consumer Affairs, Food and Civil Supplies
5. Energy
6. Environment, Forest, Science and Technology
7. Finance
8. General Administration
9. Health, Medical and Family Welfare
10. Higher Education
11. Home
12. Housing
13. Industries and Commerce
14. Information Technology, Electronics and Communications
15. Infrastructure and Investment
16. Irrigation and CAD
17. Labour, Employment Training and Factories
18. Law
19. Minorities Welfare
20. Municipal Administration and Urban Development
21. Panchayat Raj and Rural Development
22. Planning
23. Public Enterprises
24. Revenue
25. School Education
26. Scheduled Castes Development
27. Transport, Roads and Buildings
28. Tribal Welfare
29. Women, Children, Disabled and Senior Citizens
30. Youth Advancement, Tourism and Culture
