= Elections in Telangana =

Overview of the procedure of elections in the Indian state of Telangana

Telangana has a parliamentary system as defined by its constitution, with power distributed between the state government and the districts.

The Governor of Telangana is the ceremonial head of the state. However, it is the Chief Minister of Telangana who is the leader of the party or political alliance having a majority in the state elections to the Telangana Legislative Assembly. The chief minister is the leader of the executive branch of the government of Telangana. The chief minister is the chief adviser to the governor of Telangana and the head of the state council of ministers.

Elections in Telangana are conducted every five years to elect members to the Telangana Legislative Assembly and members of parliament to the Lok Sabha. There are 119 assembly constituencies and 17 Lok Sabha constituencies. The state has conducted 3 assembly elections and 2 Lok Sabha elections since independence.

== Elections ==
The Telangana State Election Commission is the federal body of Telangana that is enacted under the provisions of the Constitution and is responsible for monitoring and administering all the electoral processes in Telangana. This body is responsible for ensuring elections are free and fair, without any bias.

Elections ensure the conduct of members pre-elections, during elections, and post-elections is as per statutory legislation.

All election-related disputes are handled by the Election Commission. The Telangana High Court has held that where the enacted laws are silent or make insufficient provisions to deal with a given situation in the conduct of elections, the Election Commission has the residuary powers under the Constitution to act as appropriate.

== Types of elections ==
Elections in Telangana include elections for:

- Members of Parliament in the Rajya Sabha (Upper House)
- Members of Parliament in the Lok Sabha (Lower House)
- Members of the Telangana Legislative Assembly
- Members of local governance bodies (municipal bodies and panchayats)
- A by-election is held when the seat-holder of a particular constituency dies, resigns, or is disqualified.

== Rajya Sabha elections ==
Members of parliament in the Rajya Sabha (House of the State) from Telangana are not directly elected by being voted upon by all adult citizens of the state but by the members of the Telangana Legislative Assembly. Candidates who win the Rajya Sabha elections are called "Members of Parliament" and hold their seats for six years. The house meets in the Rajya Sabha Chamber of the Sansad Bhavan in New Delhi on matters relating to the creation of new laws or removing or improving the existing laws that affect all citizens of India. Elections take place to elect 7 members from Telangana.

== Lok Sabha elections ==
Lok Sabha constituencies of Telangana

Telangana has 17 Lok Sabha constituencies, with 3 reserved for Scheduled Castes (SC) and 2 for Scheduled Tribes (ST), where electors participate in direct elections to choose their preferred candidates for the position of Member of Parliament (MP). The state has witnessed a total of two elections till date.

=== By Party ===
Lok Sabha	Election Year	1st Party	2nd Party	3rd Party	4th Party	Others	Total Seats
16th	2014	BRS 11	INC 2	BJP 1	TDP 1	AIMIM 1 YSRCP 1	17
17th	2019	BRS 9	BJP 4	INC 3	AIMIM 1	N/A	17
18th	2024	INC 8	BJP 8	AIMIM 1	N/A		17

=== By Constituency ===
No.	Constituency	Reserved for SC/ST/None	2014 elections		2019 elections		2024 elections	
No.	Constituency	Reserved for SC/ST/None	Elected MP	Party	Elected MP	Party	Elected MP	Party
1	Adilabad	ST	G. Nagesh	TRS	Soyam Bapu Rao	BJP	Godam Nagesh	BJP
2	Peddapalli	SC	Balka Suman	TRS	V. N. Borlakunta	TRS	Vamsi Krishna Gaddam	INC
3	Karimnagar	None	B. Vinod Kumar	TRS	Bandi Sanjay Kumar	BJP	Bandi Sanjay Kumar	BJP
4	Nizamabad	None	K. Kavitha	TRS	Dharmapuri Arvind	BJP	Dharmapuri Arvind	BJP
5	Zahirabad	None	B. B. Patil	TRS	B. B. Patil	TRS	Suresh Shetkar	INC
6	Medak	None	Kotha Prabhakar Reddy	TRS	Kotha Prabhakar Reddy	TRS	Raghunandan Rao	BJP
7	Malkajgiri	None	Malla Reddy	TDP	Revanth Reddy	INC	Etela Rajender	BJP
8	Secunderabad	None	Bandaru Dattatreya	BJP	G. Kishan Reddy	BJP	G. Kishan Reddy	BJP
9	Hyderabad	None	Asaduddin Owaisi	AIMIM	Asaduddin Owaisi	AIMIM	Asaduddin Owaisi	AIMIM
10	Chevella	None	Konda Vishweshwar Reddy	TRS	G. Ranjith Reddy	TRS	Konda Vishweshwar Reddy	BJP
11	Mahbubnagar	None	A. P. Jithender Reddy	TRS	Manne Srinivas Reddy	TRS	D. K. Aruna	BJP
12	Nagarkurnool	SC	Nandi Yellaiah	INC	Pothuganti Ramulu	TRS	Mallu Ravi	INC
13	Nalgonda	None	Gutha Sukender Reddy	INC	N. Uttam Kumar Reddy	INC	Raghuveer Reddy Kunduru	INC
14	Bhongir	None	Boora Narsaiah Goud	TRS	Komatireddy Venkat Reddy	INC	Chamala Kiran Kumar Reddy	INC
15	Warangal	SC	Kadiyam Srihari	TRS	Pasunuri Dayakar	TRS	Kadiyam Kavya	INC
16	Mahabubabad	ST	Sitaram Naik	TRS	Kavitha Maloth	TRS	Balram Naik	INC
17	Khammam	None	Ponguleti Srinivas Reddy	YSRCP	Nama Nageswara Rao	TRS	Ramasahayam Raghuram Reddy	INC

== Legislative Council elections ==
Members of the Telangana Legislative Council (Upper House of the Telangana Legislature) are not directly elected. Elections take place to elect 40 members, of whom 14 were elected by members of the Telangana Legislative Assembly, 14 were elected by the local authorities of the state, 6 were nominated by the governor, 3 were elected by teachers of the state, and 3 were elected by graduates of the state. Candidates who win the Telangana Legislative Council elections are called "Members of the Legislative Council" and hold their seats for six years. The house meets in the Council Chamber of the Dr. B.R. Ambedkar Telangana State Secretariat in Hyderabad on matters relating to the creation of new laws or removing or improving the existing laws that affect all citizens of Telangana.

== Legislative Assembly elections ==
Members of the Telangana Legislative Assembly (Lower House of the Telangana Legislature) are directly elected by being voted upon by all adult citizens of the state from a set of candidates who stand in their respective constituencies. Every adult citizen of Telangana can vote only in their constituency. Candidates who win the legislative assembly elections are called "Members of the Legislative Assembly" and hold their seats for five years or until the body is dissolved by the governor of Telangana on the advice of the council of ministers. The house meets in the Assembly Chamber of the Dr. B.R. Ambedkar Telangana State Secretariat in Hyderabad on matters relating to the creation of new laws or removing or improving the existing laws that affect all citizens of Telangana. Elections take place once every five years to elect 119 members to the legislative assembly. The leader of the majority party or alliance takes the oath as chief minister of Telangana.

Legislative Assembly election results
1st Assembly (2014)	2nd Assembly (2018)	3rd Assembly (2023)

=== History of Legislative Assembly elections ===
Colour key for parties
All India Majlis-e-Ittehadul Muslimeen
Bharat Rashtra Samithi
Bharatiya Janata Party
Indian National Congress
Telugu Desam Party

LEGISLATIVE ASSEMBLY ELECTIONS
Assembly (Election)	Total Seats	First			Second			Third		
Assembly (Election)	Total Seats	Political party	Seats	Percentage of votes	Political party	Seats	Percentage of votes	Political party	Seats	Percentage of votes
1st (2014)	119	Bharat Rashtra Samithi	63	34.31%	Indian National Congress	21	25.27%	Telugu Desam Party	15	14.73%
2nd (2018)	119	Bharat Rashtra Samithi	88	46.87%	Indian National Congress	19	28.43%	All India Majlis-e-Ittehadul Muslimeen	7	2.71%
3rd (2023)	119	Indian National Congress	64	39.40%	Bharat Rashtra Samithi	39	37.35%	Bharatiya Janata Party	8	13.90%

== By-election ==
When an elected candidate to either the Rajya Sabha, Lok Sabha, or Telangana Legislative Assembly leaves the office vacant before their term ends, a by-election is conducted to find a suitable replacement to fill the vacant position. It is often referred to as by-polls.

Common reasons for by-elections:

- Resignation of the sitting M.P. or an M.L.A.
- Death of the sitting M.P. or an M.L.A.

But other reasons occur when the incumbent is disqualified for being ineligible to continue in office (criminal conviction, failure to maintain a minimum level of attendance in the office due to election irregularities found later, or when a candidate wins more than one seat and has to vacate one).

== See also ==
- Government of Telangana
