= Department of Education (Telangana) =

Minister of Education
- Vidyā Śākha Mantrī
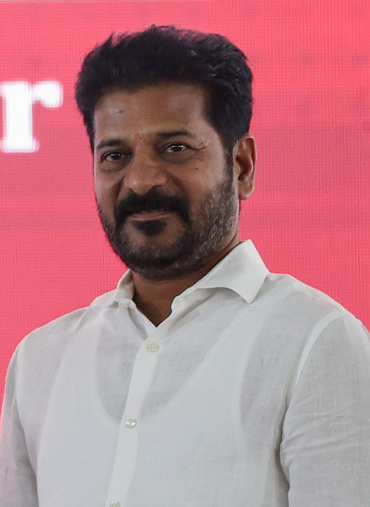
- Incumbent; Anumula Revanth Reddy since 7 December 2023
- Department of Education
- Member of: State Cabinet
- Reports to: Governor of Telangana; Chief Minister of Telangana; Telangana Legislature
- Appointer: Governor of Telangana on the advice of the Chief Minister of Telangana
- Inaugural holder: Guntakandla Jagadish Reddy
- Formation: 2 June 2014
- Website: schooledu.telangana.gov.in/ISMS/

Department of Education is a cabinet level ministerial post in the Government of Telangana. First held on 2 June 2014, this ministry has one of the important portfolios in the cabinet of the state. The incumbent Minister for the Department of Education for the state of Telangana is Revanth Reddy.

== Overview ==
The department is divided into two wings, School education and Higher education. For the Department of School Education Dr. E. Naveen Nicolas, IAS is the Director and also the State Project Director for Samagra Shiksha, Telangana. Smt. Sri Devasena IAS is the Commissioner for Higher Education.

== List of ministers ==
#	Portrait	Minister (Lifespan) Constituency	Term of office			Election (Term)	Party	Ministry	Chief Minister	Ref.
#	Portrait	Minister (Lifespan) Constituency	Term start	Term end	Duration	Election (Term)	Party	Ministry	Chief Minister	Ref.
1		Guntakandla Jagadish Reddy (born 1965); MLA for Suryapet	2 June 2014	25 June 2015	1 year, 23 days	2014 (1st)	Bharat Rashtra Samithi	Rao I	K. Chandrashekar Rao	
2		Kadiyam Srihari (born 1952); MLC	25 June 2015	6 September 2018	3 years, 73 days	2014 (1st)	Bharat Rashtra Samithi	Rao I	K. Chandrashekar Rao	
3		Patlolla Sabitha Indra Reddy (born 1963); MLA for Maheshwaram	8 September 2019	3 December 2023	4 years, 86 days	2018 (2nd)	Bharat Rashtra Samithi	Rao II	K. Chandrashekar Rao	
–		Anumula Revanth Reddy (born 1969); MLA for Kodangal	7 December 2023	Incumbent	2 years, 274 days	2023 (3rd)	Indian National Congress	Reddy	Revanth Reddy	
