= Department of Energy (Telangana) =

Minister of Energy
- Indhana Śākha Mantrī
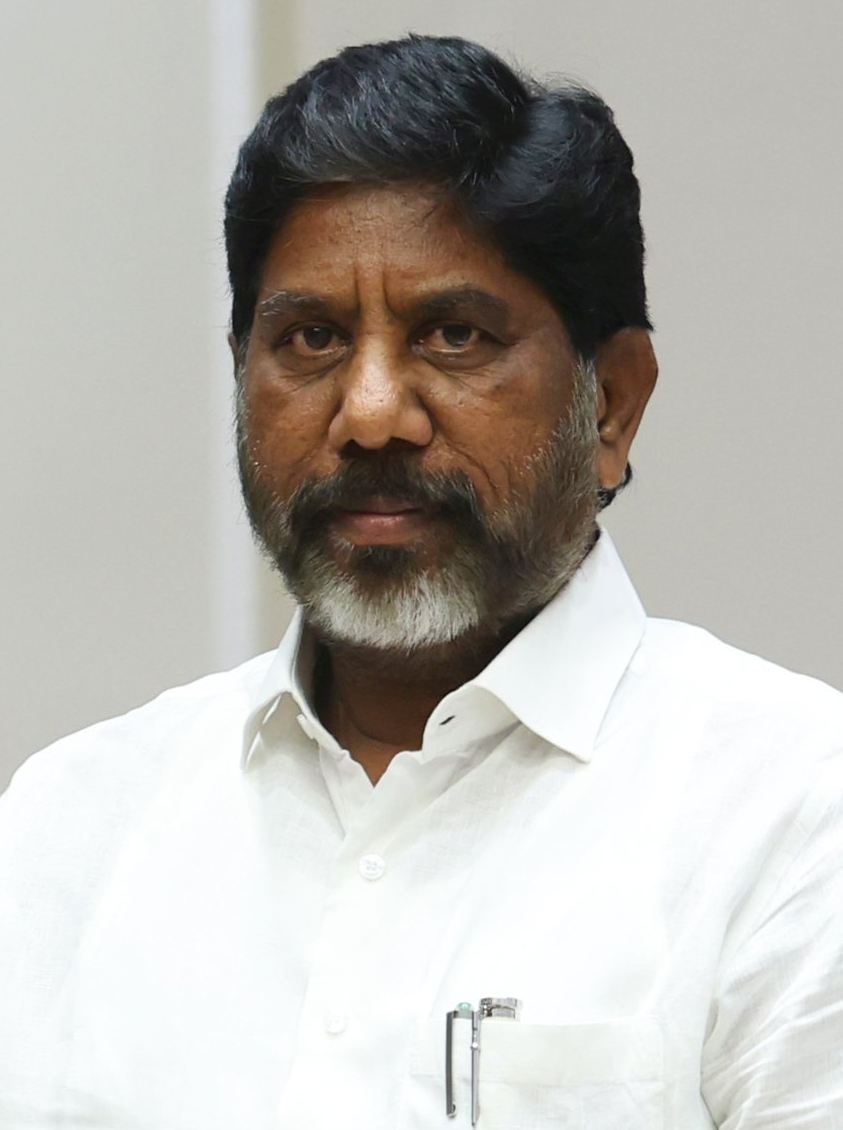
- Incumbent; Mallu Bhatti Vikramarka since 7 December 2023
- Department of Energy
- Abbreviation: E
- Member of: State Cabinet
- Reports to: Governor of Telangana; Chief Minister of Telangana; Telangana Legislature
- Appointer: Governor of Telangana on the advice of the Chief Minister of Telangana
- Inaugural holder: Charlakola Laxma Reddy
- Formation: 2 June 2014
- Website: tgceig.cgg.gov.in/login.do

Department of Energy is a cabinet level ministerial post in the Government of Telangana. First held on 16 December 2014, this ministry has one of the important portfolios in the cabinet in the state. The incumbent Minister for the Department of Energy for the state of Telangana is Mallu Bhatti Vikramarka.

== List of ministers ==
#	Portrait	Minister (Lifespan) Constituency	Term of office			Election (Term)	Party	Ministry	Chief Minister	Ref.
#	Portrait	Minister (Lifespan) Constituency	Term start	Term end	Duration	Election (Term)	Party	Ministry	Chief Minister	Ref.
1		Charlakola Laxma Reddy (born 1962); MLA for Jadcherla	16 December 2014	25 June 2015	191 days	2014 (1st)	Telangana Rashtra Samithi	Rao I	Kalvakuntla Chandrashekhar Rao	
2		Guntakandla Jagadish Reddy (born 1965); MLA for Suryapet	25 June 2015	6 September 2018	3 years, 73 days	2014 (1st)	Telangana Rashtra Samithi	Rao I	Kalvakuntla Chandrashekhar Rao	
2		Guntakandla Jagadish Reddy (born 1965); MLA for Suryapet	19 February 2019	3 December 2023	4 years, 287 days	2018 (2nd)	Telangana Rashtra Samithi	Rao II	Kalvakuntla Chandrashekhar Rao	
3		Mallu Bhatti Vikramarka (born 1961); MLA for Madhira	7 December 2023	Incumbent	2 years, 274 days	2023 (3rd)	Indian National Congress	Reddy	Anumula Revanth Reddy	
