= Second K. Chandrashekar Rao ministry =

Telangana Council of Ministers headed by K. Chandrashekar Rao (2018–2023)

- 2nd Ministry of Telangana
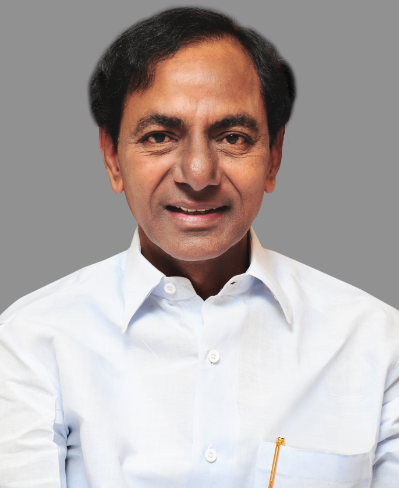
- K. Chandrashekar Rao
- Date formed: 13 December 2018
- Date dissolved: 3 December 2023

People and organisations
- Head of state: E. S. L. Narasimhan; Tamilisai Soundararajan Governor
- Head of government: K. Chandrashekhar Rao; Chief Minister
- No. of ministers: 18
- Ministers removed: 1
- Member parties: Bharat Rashtra Samithi
- Status in legislature: Majority
- Opposition party: None
- Opposition leader: None

History
- Election: 2018
- Outgoing election: 2014
- Legislature terms: 6 years (Council); 5 years (Assembly)
- Predecessor: First K. Chandrashekar Rao ministry
- Successor: Revanth Reddy ministry

The Second K. Chandrashekar Rao ministry was the highest decision-making body of executive branch of the Government of Telangana, headed by the Chief Minister of Telangana.

The 18-member cabinet (including chief minister) is its second, being sworn in by the Governor of Telangana on 13 December 2018, 19 February 2019 and 8 September 2019. It is headed by K. Chandrashekar Rao of the BRS, the first Chief Minister of Telangana.

== Council of Ministers ==
Key

- ^{RES} Resigned from office

Portfolio	Minister	Constituency	Tenure		Party
Portfolio	Minister	Constituency	Took office	Left office	Party
Chief Minister
General Administration; Planning; Law & Order; Revenue; Irrigation; Mining; Other departments not allocated to a Minister	Kalvakuntla Chandrashekar Rao	Gajwel	13 December 2018	3 December 2023	BRS
Cabinet Ministers
Home; Prisons; Fire Services	Mohammed Mahmood Ali	MLC	13 December 2018	3 December 2023	BRS
Forests & Environment; Science & Technology; Endowment; Law	Allola Indrakaran Reddy	Nirmal	19 February 2019	3 December 2023	BRS
Animal Husbandry; Fisheries; Dairy Development; Cinematography	Talasani Srinivas Yadav	Sanathnagar	19 February 2019	3 December 2023	BRS
Education	Guntakandla Jagadish Reddy	Suryapet	19 February 2019	7 September 2019	BRS
Energy	Guntakandla Jagadish Reddy	Suryapet	8 September 2019	3 December 2023	BRS
Food & Civil Supplies; Consumer Affairs	Singireddy Niranjan Reddy	Wanaparthy	19 February 2019	7 September 2019	BRS
Agriculture & Co-operation; Marketing	Singireddy Niranjan Reddy	Wanaparthy	19 February 2019	3 December 2023	BRS
Tribal Welfare; Backward Classes Welfare	Koppula Eshwar	Dharmapuri (SC)	19 February 2019	7 September 2019	BRS
Scheduled Castes Development; Minority Welfare; Disabled Welfare & Senior Citizens Welfare	Koppula Eshwar	Dharmapuri (SC)	19 February 2019	3 December 2023	BRS
Panchayat Raj & Rural Development; Rural Water Supply	Errabelli Dayakar Rao	Palakurthi	19 February 2019	3 December 2023	BRS
Prohibition & Excise; Sports & Youth Services; Tourism & Culture; Archaeology	Virusanolla Srinivas Goud	Mahabubnagar	19 February 2019	3 December 2023	BRS
Transport	Vemula Prashanth Reddy	Balkonda	19 February 2019	7 September 2019	BRS
Housing; Roads & Buildings; Legislative Affairs	Vemula Prashanth Reddy	Balkonda	19 February 2019	3 December 2023	BRS
Women & Child Welfare	Chamakura Malla Reddy	Medchal	19 February 2019	7 September 2019	BRS
Labour & Employment; Factories; Skill Development	Chamakura Malla Reddy	Medchal	19 February 2019	3 December 2023	BRS
Medical & Health; Family Welfare	Etela Rajender	Huzurabad	19 February 2019	1 May 2021	BRS
Finance	Thanneeru Harish Rao	Siddipet	8 September 2019	3 December 2023	BRS
Medical & Health; Family Welfare	Thanneeru Harish Rao	Siddipet	9 November 2021	3 December 2023	BRS
Municipal Administration and Urban Development; Industries; Information Technology & Communications	Kalvakuntla Taraka Rama Rao	Sircilla	8 September 2019	3 December 2023	BRS
Education	Sabitha Indra Reddy	Maheshwaram	8 September 2019	3 December 2023	BRS
Backward Classes Welfare; Food & Civil Supplies; Consumer Affairs	Gangula Kamalakar	Karimnagar	8 September 2019	3 December 2023	BRS
Scheduled Tribes Welfare; Women and Child Welfare	Satyavathi Rathod	MLC	8 September 2019	3 December 2023	BRS
Transport	Puvvada Ajay Kumar	Khammam	8 September 2019	3 December 2023	BRS
Mines & Geology; Information & Public Relations	Patnam Mahender Reddy	MLC	24 August 2023	3 December 2023	BRS

== Administrative response ==
The Comptroller and Auditor General of India, a supreme audit institution and statutory auditor of Government-owned corporations, reported a substantial overspending of Rs 2,88,811 crore between 2014–15 and 2021–22, significantly exceeding the allocated funds by the Bharat Rashtra Samithi led government. The negligence in budget handling became evident by the second year, prompting additional loans and increased interest payments. It was noted that the excess expenditure was not regularized, despite discussions in the Public Accounts Committee.
