= Department of Endowments (Telangana) =

Minister of Endowments
- Dēvādāya Śākha Mantrī
- Incumbent; Konda Surekha since 7 December 2023
- Department of Endowments
- Abbreviation: E
- Member of: State Cabinet
- Reports to: Governor of Telangana; Chief Minister of Telangana; Telangana Legislature
- Appointer: Governor of Telangana on the advice of the Chief Minister of Telangana
- Inaugural holder: Allola Indrakaran Reddy
- Formation: 2 June 2014
- Website: www.endowments.ts.nic.in

Department of Endowments is a cabinet level ministerial post in the Government of Telangana. First held on 16 December 2014, this ministry has one of the important portfolios in the cabinet managing the temples in the state. The incumbent Minister for the Department of Endowments for the state of Telangana is Konda Surekha.

== List of ministers ==
#	Portrait	Minister (Lifespan) Constituency	Term of office			Election (Term)	Party	Ministry	Chief Minister	Ref.
#	Portrait	Minister (Lifespan) Constituency	Term start	Term end	Duration	Election (Term)	Party	Ministry	Chief Minister	Ref.
1		Allola Indrakaran Reddy (born 1949); MLA for Nirmal	16 December 2014	6 September 2018	3 years, 264 days	2014 (1st)	Telangana Rashtra Samithi	Rao I	Kalvakuntla Chandrashekhar Rao	
2		Allola Indrakaran Reddy (born 1949); MLA for Nirmal	19 February 2019	3 December 2023	4 years, 287 days	2018 (2nd)	Telangana Rashtra Samithi	Rao II	Kalvakuntla Chandrashekhar Rao	
3		Konda Surekha (born 1965); MLA for Warangal East	7 December 2023	Incumbent	2 years, 274 days	2023 (3rd)	Indian National Congress	Reddy	Anumula Revanth Reddy	
