= Department of Municipal Administration and Urban Development (Telangana) =

Minister of Municipal Administration and Urban Development
- Purapālaka Paripālana mariyu Paṭṭaṇābhivr̥d'dhi Śākha Mantrī
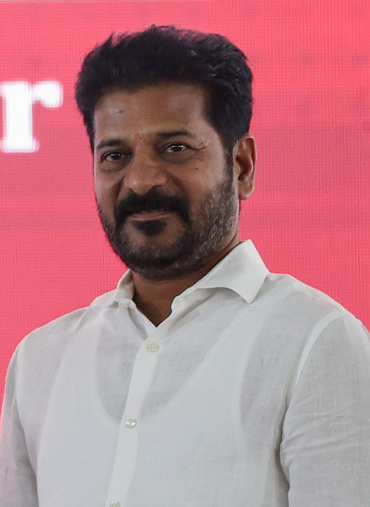
- Incumbent; Anumula Revanth Reddy since 7 December 2023
- Department of Municipal Administration and Urban Development
- Abbreviation: MA&UD
- Member of: State Cabinet
- Reports to: Governor of Telangana; Chief Minister of Telangana; Telangana Legislature
- Appointer: Governor of Telangana on the advice of the Chief Minister of Telangana
- Inaugural holder: Kalvakuntla Taraka Rama Rao
- Formation: 2 June 2014
- Website: emunicipal.telangana.gov.in

Department of Municipal Administration and Urban Development is a cabinet level ministerial post in the Government of Telangana. First held on 2 June 2014, this ministry has one of the important portfolios in the cabinet. The current Minister of MA&UD for the state of Telangana is Revanth Reddy.

== List of ministers ==
#	Portrait	Minister (Lifespan) Constituency	Term of office			Election (Term)	Party	Ministry	Chief Minister	Ref.
#	Portrait	Minister (Lifespan) Constituency	Term start	Term end	Duration	Election (Term)	Party	Ministry	Chief Minister	Ref.
1		K. T. Rama Rao (born 1976); MLA for Sircilla	2 June 2014	6 September 2018	4 years, 96 days	2014 (1st)	Bharat Rashtra Samithi	Rao I	K. Chandrashekar Rao	
1		K. T. Rama Rao (born 1976); MLA for Sircilla	8 September 2019	6 December 2023	4 years, 89 days	2018 (2nd)	Bharat Rashtra Samithi	Rao II	K. Chandrashekar Rao	
–		Revanth Reddy (born 1969); MLA for Kodangal (Chief Minister)	7 December 2023	Incumbent	2 years, 274 days	2023 (3rd)	Indian National Congress	Reddy	Revanth Reddy	
