= 1st Telangana Assembly =

1st Legislature of Telangana

First Telangana Legislative Assembly
←	13th Andhra Pradesh Assembly	2nd Telangana Assembly	→
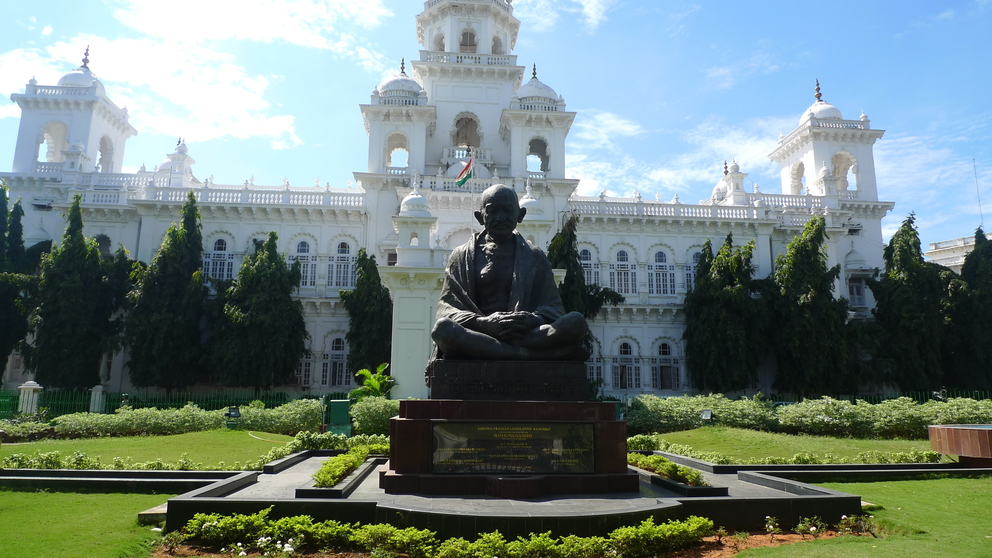

Overview
- Legislative body: Telangana Legislative Assembly
- Meeting place: Assembly Building, Hyderabad, Telangana, India
- Term: 9 June 2014 – 6 September 2018
- Election: 2014 Andhra Pradesh Legislative Assembly election
- Government: TRS
- Opposition: INC
- Government (88) TRS (88) Official Opposition (16) INC (16) Other Opposition (15) AIMIM (7) BJP (5) TDP (2) CPI (1)
- Members: 119
- Speaker: S. Madhusudhana Chary
- Deputy Speaker: Padma Devender Reddy
- Chief Minister: K. Chandrashekar Rao
- Leader of the Opposition: Kunduru Jana Reddy

The First Legislative Assembly of Telangana was constituted after the 2014 Telangana Legislative Assembly elections which were held on 30 April 2014 and the results were announced on 16 May 2014, with K. Chandrashekar Rao from Telangana Rashtra Samithi taking oath as the 1st Chief Minister of Telangana on 2 June 2014.

== Composition ==
=== Presiding officers ===
As of December 2018
Designation	Name
Governor	E. S. L. Narasimhan
Speaker	S. Madhusudhana Chary (TRS)
Deputy Speaker	Padma Devender Reddy (TRS)
Leader of the House	K. Chandrashekar Rao (TRS)
Leader of the Opposition	Kunduru Jana Reddy (INC)

=== Members ===
Party	Members	
Party	May 2014	December 2018
Telangana Rashtra Samithi	63	88
Indian National Congress	21	16
Telugu Desam Party	15	2
All India Majlis-e-Ittehadul Muslimeen	7	7
Bharatiya Janata Party	5	5
YSR Congress Party	3	0
Bahujan Samaj Party	2	0
Communist Party of India	1	1
Communist Party of India	1	0
Independent	1	0
Total	119	

== Members of Legislative Assembly ==
District	No.	Constituency	Name	Party	Remarks
Adilabad	1	Sirpur	Koneru Konappa	Bahujan Samaj Party	Defected from BSP to TRS
Adilabad	1	Sirpur	Koneru Konappa	Telangana Rashtra Samithi	Defected from BSP to TRS
Adilabad	2	Chennur (SC)	Nallala Odelu	Telangana Rashtra Samithi	
Adilabad	3	Bellampalli (SC)	Durgam Chinnaiah	Telangana Rashtra Samithi	
Adilabad	4	Mancherial	Nadipelli Diwakar Rao	Telangana Rashtra Samithi	
Adilabad	5	Asifabad (ST)	Kova Laxmi	Telangana Rashtra Samithi	
Adilabad	6	Khanapur (ST)	Ajmeera Rekha	Telangana Rashtra Samithi	
Adilabad	7	Adilabad	Jogu Ramanna	Telangana Rashtra Samithi	Cabinet Minister
Adilabad	8	Boath (ST)	Rathod Bapu Rao	Telangana Rashtra Samithi	
Adilabad	9	Nirmal	Allola Indrakaran Reddy	Bahujan Samaj Party	Defected from BSP to TRS
Adilabad	9	Nirmal	Allola Indrakaran Reddy	Telangana Rashtra Samithi	Cabinet Minister
Adilabad	10	Mudhole	Gaddigari Vittal Reddy	Indian National Congress	Defected INC to TRS
Adilabad	10	Mudhole	Gaddigari Vittal Reddy	Telangana Rashtra Samithi	Defected INC to TRS
Nizamabad	11	Armur	Asannagari Jeevan Reddy	Telangana Rashtra Samithi	
Nizamabad	12	Bodhan	Shakil Aamir Mohammed	Telangana Rashtra Samithi	
Nizamabad	13	Jukkal (SC)	Hanmanth Shinde	Telangana Rashtra Samithi	
Nizamabad	14	Banswada	Pocharam Srinivas Reddy	Telangana Rashtra Samithi	Cabinet Minister
Nizamabad	15	Yellareddy	Eanugu Ravinder Reddy	Indian National Congress	
Nizamabad	16	Kamareddy	Gampa Govardhan	Telangana Rashtra Samithi	
Nizamabad	17	Nizamabad Urban)	Bigala Ganesh	Telangana Rashtra Samithi	
Nizamabad	18	Nizamabad Rural	Baji Reddy Goverdhan	Telangana Rashtra Samithi	
Nizamabad	19	Balkonda	Vemula Prashanth Reddy	Telangana Rashtra Samithi	
Karimnagar	20	Koratla	Kalvakuntla Vidya Sagar Rao	Telangana Rashtra Samithi	
Karimnagar	21	Jagtial	T. Jeevan Reddy	Indian National Congress	
Karimnagar	22	Dharmapuri	Koppula Eshwar	Telangana Rashtra Samithi	
Karimnagar	23	Ramagundam	Somarapu Satyanarayana	Telangana Rashtra Samithi	
Karimnagar	24	Manthani	Putta Madhukar	Telangana Rashtra Samithi	
Karimnagar	25	Peddapalle	Dasari Manohar Reddy	Telangana Rashtra Samithi	
Karimnagar	26	Karimnagar	Gangula Kamalakar	Telangana Rashtra Samithi	
Karimnagar	27	Choppadandi (SC)	Bodige Shobha	Telangana Rashtra Samithi	
Karimnagar	28	Vemulawada	Chennamaneni Ramesh	Telangana Rashtra Samithi	
Karimnagar	29	Sircilla	K. T. Rama Rao	Telangana Rashtra Samithi	Cabinet Minister
Karimnagar	30	Manakondur (SC)	Rasamayi Balakishan	Telangana Rashtra Samithi	
Karimnagar	31	Huzurabad	Etela Rajender	Telangana Rashtra Samithi	Cabinet Minister
Karimnagar	32	Husnabad	Vodithela Sathish Kumar	Telangana Rashtra Samithi	
Medak	33	Siddipet	T. Harish Rao	Telangana Rashtra Samithi	Cabinet Minister
Medak	34	Medak	Padma Devender Reddy	Telangana Rashtra Samithi	Deputy Speaker
Medak	35	Narayankhed	Patlolla Kishta Reddy	Indian National Congress	Died on 25 August 2015
Medak	35	Narayankhed	Mahareddy Bhupal Reddy	Telangana Rashtra Samithi	Won By-election
Medak	36	Andole (SC)	Babu Mohan	Telangana Rashtra Samithi	
Medak	37	Narsapur	Chilumula Madan Reddy	Telangana Rashtra Samithi	
Medak	38	Zahirabad (SC)	J. Geeta Reddy	Indian National Congress	
Medak	39	Sangareddy	Chinta Prabhakar	Telangana Rashtra Samithi	
Medak	40	Patancheru	Gudem Mahipal Reddy	Telangana Rashtra Samithi	
Medak	41	Dubbak	Solipeta Ramalinga Reddy	Telangana Rashtra Samithi	
Medak	42	Gajwel	K. Chandrashekar Rao	Telangana Rashtra Samithi	Chief Minister of Telangana
Ranga Reddy	43	Medchal	M. Sudheer Reddy	Telangana Rashtra Samithi	
Ranga Reddy	44	Malkajgiri	C. Kanaka Reddy	Telangana Rashtra Samithi	
Ranga Reddy	45	Quthbullapur	K. P. Vivekanand Goud	Telugu Desam Party	Defected from TDP to TRS
Ranga Reddy	45	Quthbullapur	K. P. Vivekanand Goud	Telangana Rashtra Samithi	Defected from TDP to TRS
Ranga Reddy	46	Kukatpally	Madhavaram Krishna Rao	Telugu Desam Party	Defected from TDP to TRS
Ranga Reddy	46	Kukatpally	Madhavaram Krishna Rao	Telangana Rashtra Samithi	Defected from TDP to TRS
Ranga Reddy	47	Uppal	N. V. S. S. Prabhakar	Bharatiya Janata Party	
Ranga Reddy	48	Ibrahimpatnam	Manchireddy Kishan Reddy	Telugu Desam Party	Defected from TDP to TRS
Ranga Reddy	48	Ibrahimpatnam	Manchireddy Kishan Reddy	Telangana Rashtra Samithi	Defected from TDP to TRS
Ranga Reddy	49	L. B. Nagar	R. Krishnaiah	Telugu Desam Party	
Ranga Reddy	50	Maheshwaram	Teegala Krishna Reddy	Telugu Desam Party	Defected from TDP to TRS
Ranga Reddy	50	Maheshwaram	Teegala Krishna Reddy	Telangana Rashtra Samithi	Defected from TDP to TRS
Ranga Reddy	51	Rajendranagar	T. Prakash Goud	Telugu Desam Party	Defected from TDP to TRS
Ranga Reddy	51	Rajendranagar	T. Prakash Goud	Telangana Rashtra Samithi	Defected from TDP to TRS
Ranga Reddy	52	Serilingampally	Arekapudi Gandhi	Telugu Desam Party	Defected from TDP to TRS
Ranga Reddy	52	Serilingampally	Arekapudi Gandhi	Telangana Rashtra Samithi	Defected from TDP to TRS
Ranga Reddy	53	Chevella (SC)	Kale Yadaiah	Indian National Congress	Defected from INC to TRS
Ranga Reddy	53	Chevella (SC)	Kale Yadaiah	Telangana Rashtra Samithi	Defected from INC to TRS
Ranga Reddy	54	Pargi	T. Ram Mohan Reddy	Indian National Congress	
Ranga Reddy	55	Vikarabad (SC)	B. Sanjeeva Rao	Telangana Rashtra Samithi	
Ranga Reddy	56	Tandur	P. Mahender Reddy	Telangana Rashtra Samithi	Cabinet Minister
Hyderabad	57	Musheerabad	K. Laxman	Bharatiya Janata Party	
Hyderabad	58	Malakpet	Ahmed Bin Abdullah Balala	All India Majlis-e-Ittehadul Muslimeen	
Hyderabad	59	Amberpet	G. Kishan Reddy	Bharatiya Janata Party	
Hyderabad	60	Khairatabad	Chintala Ramachandra Reddy	Bharatiya Janata Party	
Hyderabad	61	Jubilee Hills	Maganti Gopinath	Telugu Desam Party	Defected from TDP to TRS
Hyderabad	61	Jubilee Hills	Maganti Gopinath	Telangana Rashtra Samithi	Defected from TDP to TRS
Hyderabad	62	Sanathnagar	Talasani Srinivas Yadav	Telugu Desam Party	Defected from TDP to TRS
Hyderabad	62	Sanathnagar	Talasani Srinivas Yadav	Telangana Rashtra Samithi	Cabinet Minister
Hyderabad	63	Nampally	Jaffer Hussain	All India Majlis-e-Ittehadul Muslimeen	
Hyderabad	64	Karwan	Kausar Mohiuddin	All India Majlis-e-Ittehadul Muslimeen	
Hyderabad	65	Goshamahal	T. Raja Singh	Bharatiya Janata Party	
Hyderabad	66	Charminar	Syed Ahmed Pasha Quadri	All India Majlis-e-Ittehadul Muslimeen	
Hyderabad	67	Chandrayangutta	Akbaruddin Owaisi	All India Majlis-e-Ittehadul Muslimeen	
Hyderabad	68	Yakutpura	Mumtaz Ahmed Khan	All India Majlis-e-Ittehadul Muslimeen	
Hyderabad	69	Bahadurpura	Mohammad Moazam Khan	All India Majlis-e-Ittehadul Muslimeen	
Hyderabad	70	Secunderabad	T. Padma Rao Goud	Telangana Rashtra Samithi	Cabinet Minister
Hyderabad	71	Secunderabad Cantt. (SC)	G. Sayanna	Telugu Desam Party	Defected from TDP to TRS
Hyderabad	71	Secunderabad Cantt. (SC)	G. Sayanna	Telangana Rashtra Samithi	Defected from TDP to TRS
Mahabubnagar	72	Kodangal	Revanth Reddy	Telugu Desam Party	Defected from TDP to INC
Mahabubnagar	72	Kodangal	Revanth Reddy	Indian National Congress	Defected from TDP to INC
Mahabubnagar	73	Narayanpet	S. Rajender Reddy	Telugu Desam Party	Defected from TDP to TRS
Mahabubnagar	73	Narayanpet	S. Rajender Reddy	Telangana Rashtra Samithi	Defected from TDP to TRS
Mahabubnagar	74	Mahbubnagar	V. Srinivas Goud	Telangana Rashtra Samithi	
Mahabubnagar	75	Jadcherla	C. Laxma Reddy	Telangana Rashtra Samithi	Cabinet Minister
Mahabubnagar	76	Devarkadra	Alla Venkateshwar Reddy	Telangana Rashtra Samithi	
Mahabubnagar	77	Makthal	Chittem Ram Mohan Reddy	Indian National Congress	Defected from INC to TRS
Mahabubnagar	77	Makthal	Chittem Ram Mohan Reddy	Telangana Rashtra Samithi	Defected from INC to TRS
Mahabubnagar	78	Wanaparthy	G. Chinna Reddy	Indian National Congress	
Mahabubnagar	79	Gadwal	D. K. Aruna	Indian National Congress	
Mahabubnagar	80	Alampur (SC)	S. A. Sampath Kumar	Indian National Congress	
Mahabubnagar	81	Nagarkurnool	Marri Janardhan Reddy	Telangana Rashtra Samithi	
Mahabubnagar	82	Achampet (SC)	Guvvala Balaraju	Telangana Rashtra Samithi	
Mahabubnagar	83	Kalwakurthy	Challa Vamshi Chand Reddy	Indian National Congress	
Mahabubnagar	84	Shadnagar	Yelganamoni Anjaiah Yadav	Telangana Rashtra Samithi	
Mahabubnagar	85	Kollapur	Jupally Krishna Rao	Telangana Rashtra Samithi	Cabinet Minister
Nalgonda	86	Devarakonda (ST)	Ramavath Ravindra Kumar	Communist Party of India	Defected from CPI to TRS
Nalgonda	86	Devarakonda (ST)	Ramavath Ravindra Kumar	Telangana Rashtra Samithi	Defected from CPI to TRS
Nalgonda	87	Nagarjuna Sagar	Kunduru Jana Reddy	Indian National Congress	Leader of Opposition
Nalgonda	88	Miryalaguda	Nallamothu Bhaskar Rao	Indian National Congress	Defected from INC to TRS
Nalgonda	88	Miryalaguda	Nallamothu Bhaskar Rao	Telangana Rashtra Samithi	Defected from INC to TRS
Nalgonda	89	Huzurnagar	N. Uttam Kumar Reddy	Indian National Congress	
Nalgonda	90	Kodad	N. Padmavathi Reddy	Indian National Congress	
Nalgonda	91	Suryapet	Guntakandla Jagadish Reddy	Telangana Rashtra Samithi	Cabinet Minister
Nalgonda	92	Nalgonda	Komatireddy Venkat Reddy	Indian National Congress	
Nalgonda	93	Munugode	Kusukuntla Prabhakar Reddy	Telangana Rashtra Samithi	
Nalgonda	94	Bhongir	Pailla Shekar Reddy	Telangana Rashtra Samithi	
Nalgonda	95	Nakrekal (SC)	Vemula Veeresham	Telangana Rashtra Samithi	
Nalgonda	96	Thungathurthi (SC)	Gadari Kishore Kumar	Telangana Rashtra Samithi	
Nalgonda	97	Alair	Gongidi Suntiha	Telangana Rashtra Samithi	
Warangal	98	Jangaon	Muthireddy Yadagiri Reddy	Telangana Rashtra Samithi	
Warangal	99	Ghanpur (Station) (SC)	T. Rajaiah	Telangana Rashtra Samithi	Deputy Chief Minister of Telangana (Until Jan 2015)
Warangal	100	Palakurthi	Errabelli Dayakar Rao	Telugu Desam Party	Defected from TDP to TRS
Warangal	100	Palakurthi	Errabelli Dayakar Rao	Telangana Rashtra Samithi	Defected from TDP to TRS
Warangal	101	Dornakal (ST)	D. S. Redya Naik	Indian National Congress	Defected from INC to TRS
Warangal	101	Dornakal (ST)	D. S. Redya Naik	Telangana Rashtra Samithi	Defected from INC to TRS
Warangal	102	Mahabubabad (ST)	Banoth Shankar Nayak	Telangana Rashtra Samithi	
Warangal	103	Narsampet	Donthi Madhava Reddy	Independent	Joined INC
Warangal	103	Narsampet	Donthi Madhava Reddy	Indian National Congress	Joined INC
Warangal	104	Parkal	Challa Dharma Reddy	Telugu Desam Party	Defected from TDP to TRS
Warangal	104	Parkal	Challa Dharma Reddy	Telangana Rashtra Samithi	Defected from TDP to TRS
Warangal	105	Warangal West	Dasyam Vinay Bhasker	Telangana Rashtra Samithi	
Warangal	106	Warangal East	Konda Surekha	Telangana Rashtra Samithi	Defected from TRS to INC
Warangal	106	Warangal East	Konda Surekha	Indian National Congress	Defected from TRS to INC
Warangal	107	Waradhanapet (SC)	Aroori Ramesh	Telangana Rashtra Samithi	
Warangal	108	Bhupalpalle	S. Madhusudhana Chary	Telangana Rashtra Samithi	Speaker
Warangal	109	Mulug (ST)	Azmeera Chandulal	Telangana Rashtra Samithi	Cabinet Minister
Khammam	110	Pinapaka (ST)	Payam Venkateswarlu	YSR Congress Party	Defected from YSRCP to TRS
Khammam	110	Pinapaka (ST)	Payam Venkateswarlu	Telangana Rashtra Samithi	Defected from YSRCP to TRS
Khammam	111	Yellandu (ST)	Koram Kanakaiah	Indian National Congress	Defected from INC to TRS
Khammam	111	Yellandu (ST)	Koram Kanakaiah	Telangana Rashtra Samithi	Defected from INC to TRS
Khammam	112	Khammam	Puvvada Ajay Kumar	Indian National Congress	Defected from INC to TRS
Khammam	112	Khammam	Puvvada Ajay Kumar	Telangana Rashtra Samithi	Defected from INC to TRS
Khammam	113	Palair	Ramireddy Venkata Reddy	Indian National Congress	Died on 4 March 2016
Khammam	113	Palair	Thummala Nageswara Rao	Telangana Rashtra Samithi	Won By-election; Cabinet Minister
Khammam	114	Madhira (SC)	Mallu Bhatti Vikramarka	Indian National Congress	
Khammam	115	Wyra (ST)	Banoth Madanlal	YSR Congress Party	Defected from YSRCP to TRS
Khammam	115	Wyra (ST)	Banoth Madanlal	Telangana Rashtra Samithi	Defected from YSRCP to TRS
Khammam	116	Sathupalli (SC)	Sandra Venkata Veeraiah	Telugu Desam Party	
Khammam	117	Kothagudem	Jalagam Venkat Rao	Telangana Rashtra Samithi	
Khammam	118	Aswaraopeta (ST)	Thati Venkateswarlu	YSR Congress Party	Defected from YSRCP to TRS
Khammam	118	Aswaraopeta (ST)	Thati Venkateswarlu	Telangana Rashtra Samithi	Defected from YSRCP to TRS
Khammam	119	Bhadrachalam (ST)	Sunnam Rajaiah	Communist Party of India (Marxist)	
