= Department of Panchayat Raj and Rural Development (Telangana) =

Minister of Panchayat Raj and Rural Development
- Pan̄cāyat Rāj mariyu Grāmīṇābhivr̥d'dhi Śākha Mantrī
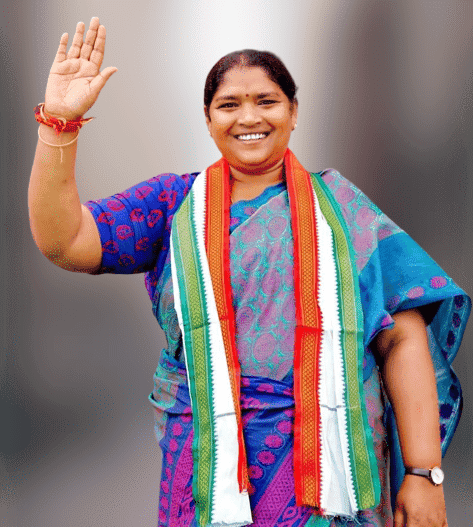
- Incumbent; Dansari Anasuya since 7 December 2023
- Department of Panchayat Raj and Rural Development
- Abbreviation: PR&RD
- Member of: State Cabinet
- Reports to: Governor of Telangana; Chief Minister of Telangana; Telangana Legislature
- Appointer: Governor of Telangana on the advice of the Chief Minister of Telangana
- Inaugural holder: Jupally Krishna Rao
- Formation: 2 June 2014
- Website: epanchayat.telangana.gov.in/cs

Department of Panchayat Raj and Rural Development is a cabinet level ministerial post in the Government of Telangana. First held on 16 December 2014, this ministry has one of the important portfolios in the cabinet of the state. The incumbent Minister for the Department of Panchayat Raj and Rural Development for the state of Telangana is Dansari Anasuya.

== List of ministers ==
#	Portrait	Minister (Lifespan) Constituency	Term of office			Election (Term)	Party	Ministry	Chief Minister	Ref.
#	Portrait	Minister (Lifespan) Constituency	Term start	Term end	Duration	Election (Term)	Party	Ministry	Chief Minister	Ref.
1		Jupally Krishna Rao (born 1955); MLA for Kollapur	16 December 2014	6 September 2018	3 years, 264 days	2014 (1st)	Telangana Rashtra Samithi	Rao I	Kalvakuntla Chandrashekhar Rao	
2		Errabelli Dayakar Rao (born 1956); MLA for Palakurthi	19 February 2019	3 December 2023	4 years, 287 days	2018 (2nd)	Telangana Rashtra Samithi	Rao II	Kalvakuntla Chandrashekhar Rao	
3		Dansari Anasuya (born 1971); MLA for Mulug	7 December 2023	Incumbent	2 years, 274 days	2023 (3rd)	Indian National Congress	Reddy	Anumula Revanth Reddy	
