= Department of Transport (Telangana) =

Minister of Transport
- Ravāṇā Śākha Mantrī
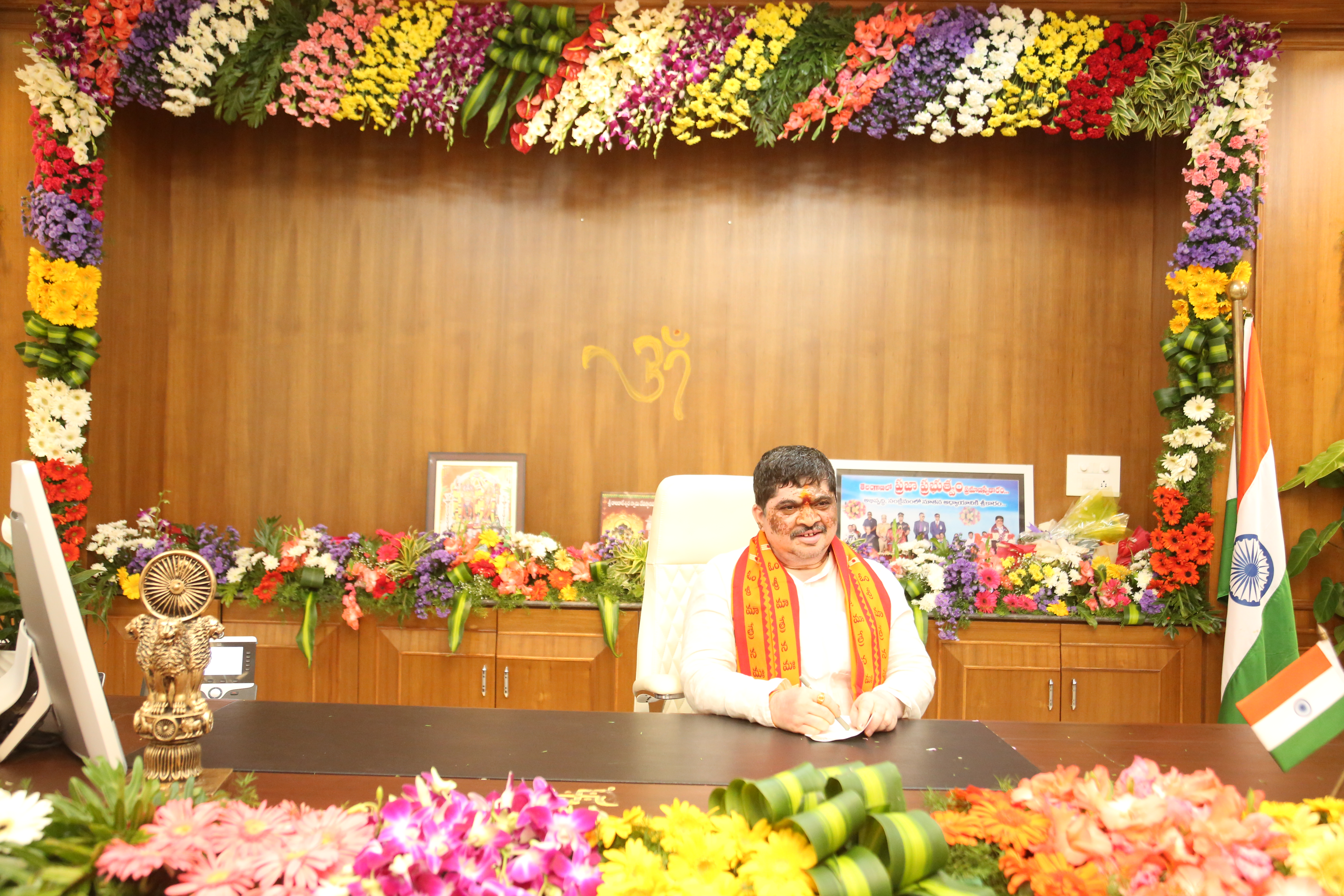
- Incumbent; Ponnam Prabhakar since 7 December 2023
- Department of Transport
- Abbreviation: T
- Member of: State Cabinet
- Reports to: Governor of Telangana; Chief Minister of Telangana; Telangana Legislature
- Appointer: Governor of Telangana on the advice of the Chief Minister of Telangana
- Inaugural holder: Patnam Mahender Reddy
- Formation: 2 June 2014
- Website: transport.telangana.gov.in

Department of Transport is a cabinet level ministerial post in the Government of Telangana. First held on 16 December 2014, this ministry has one of the important portfolios in the cabinet in the state. The incumbent Minister for the Department of Transport for the state of Telangana is Ponnam Prabhakar.

== List of ministers ==
#	Portrait	Minister (Lifespan) Constituency	Term of office			Election (Term)	Party	Ministry	Chief Minister	Ref.
#	Portrait	Minister (Lifespan) Constituency	Term start	Term end	Duration	Election (Term)	Party	Ministry	Chief Minister	Ref.
1		Patnam Mahender Reddy (born 1963); MLA for Tandur	16 December 2014	6 September 2018	3 years, 264 days	2014 (1st)	Telangana Rashtra Samithi	Rao I	Kalvakuntla Chandrashekhar Rao	
2		Puvvada Ajay Kumar (born 1965); MLA for Khammam	8 September 2019	3 December 2023	4 years, 86 days	2018 (2nd)	Telangana Rashtra Samithi	Rao II	Kalvakuntla Chandrashekhar Rao	
3		Ponnam Prabhakar (born 1967); MLA for Husnabad	7 December 2023	Incumbent	2 years, 274 days	2023 (3rd)	Indian National Congress	Reddy	Anumula Revanth Reddy	
