= Department of Information Technology, Electronics and Communications (Telangana) =

Minister of Information Technology, Electronics and Communications
- Inpharmēṣan Ṭeknālajī, Elakṭrāniks mariyu Kamyūnikēṣans Śākha Mantrī
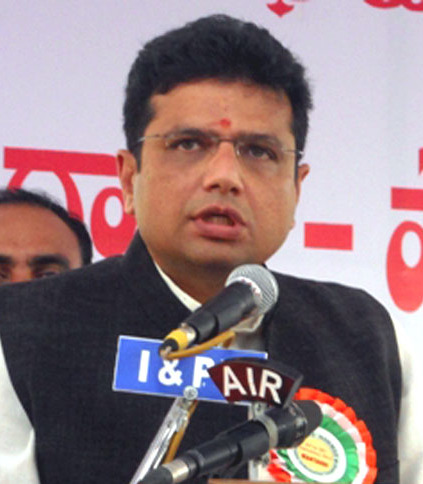
- Incumbent; Duddilla Sridhar Babu since 7 December 2023
- Department of Information Technology, Electronics and Communications
- Abbreviation: ITE&C
- Member of: State Cabinet
- Reports to: Governor of Telangana; Chief Minister of Telangana; Telangana Legislature
- Appointer: Governor of Telangana on the advice of the Chief Minister of Telangana
- Inaugural holder: Kalvakuntla Taraka Rama Rao
- Formation: 2 June 2014
- Website: it.telangana.gov.in

Department of Information Technology, Electronics and Communications is a cabinet level ministerial post in the Government of Telangana. First held on 2 June 2014, this ministry has one of the important portfolios in the cabinet. K. T. Rama Rao of Bharat Rashtra Samithi was the inaugural holder of this portfolio for two consecutive terms. D. Sridhar Babu is the incumbent minister for this portfolio from Indian National Congress.

== Background ==
After the bifurcation of the Andhra Pradesh (1956–2014) into Telangana and the residual state of Andhra Pradesh, Telangana was left with Hyderabad emerging as the hub for Information and Technology (IT). Reforms initiated during the Second N. Chandrababu Naidu ministry paved the way for the development of the IT sector in Hyderabad, and successive governments continued the momentum after the formation of Telangana. K. T. Rama Rao was credited with taking up initiatives to foster the IT sector in the state.

== List of ministers ==
#	Portrait	Minister (Lifespan) Constituency	Term of office			Election (Term)	Party	Ministry	Chief Minister	Ref.
#	Portrait	Minister (Lifespan) Constituency	Term start	Term end	Duration	Election (Term)	Party	Ministry	Chief Minister	Ref.
1		Kalvakuntla Taraka Rama Rao (born 1976); MLA for Sircilla	2 June 2014	6 September 2018	4 years, 96 days	2014 (1st)	Telangana Rashtra Samithi	Rao I	Kalvakuntla Chandrashekhar Rao	
1		Kalvakuntla Taraka Rama Rao (born 1976); MLA for Sircilla	8 September 2019	3 December 2023	4 years, 86 days	2018 (2nd)	Telangana Rashtra Samithi	Rao II	Kalvakuntla Chandrashekhar Rao	
2		Duddilla Sridhar Babu (born 1969); MLA for Manthani	7 December 2023	Incumbent	2 years, 274 days	2023 (3rd)	Indian National Congress	Reddy	Anumula Revanth Reddy	
