= Department of Agriculture and Co-operation (Telangana) =

Minister of Agriculture and Co-operation
- Vyavasāyaṁ mariyu Sahakāra Śākha Mantrī
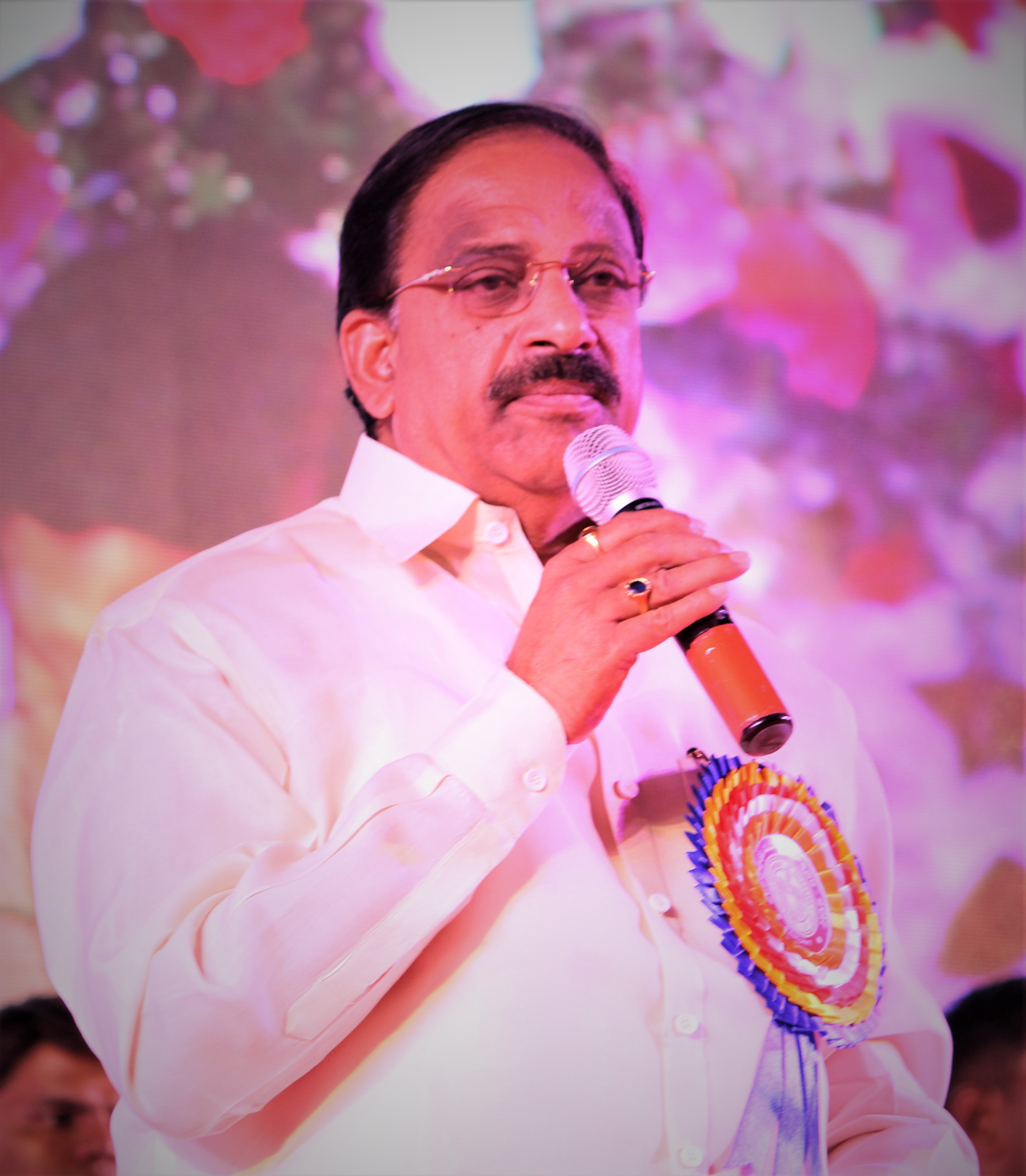
- Incumbent; Thummala Nageswara Rao since 7 December 2023
- Department of Agriculture and Co-operation
- Abbreviation: A&C
- Member of: State Cabinet
- Reports to: Governor of Telangana; Chief Minister of Telangana; Telangana Legislature
- Appointer: Governor of Telangana on the advice of the Chief Minister of Telangana
- Inaugural holder: Pocharam Srinivas Reddy
- Formation: 2 June 2014
- Website: agri.telangana.gov.in

Department of Agriculture and Co-operation is a cabinet level ministerial post in the Government of Telangana. First held on 2 June 2014, this ministry has one of the important portfolios in the cabinet of the state. The incumbent Minister for the Department of Agriculture and Co-operation for the state of Telangana is Thummala Nageswara Rao.

The department was created mainly to provide agricultural extension services to farmers and to transfer the latest technical knowledge to the farming community. Telangana's agriculture department separated from Andhra Pradesh as part of Andhra Pradesh bifurcation. It aims to promote agricultural trade and to boost agricultural production and productivity in Telangana.

== Background ==
The economy of Telangana is largely dependent on agriculture and most people have taken farming as a profession. The podu system is used in some areas.

== List of ministers ==
| # | Portrait | Minister (Lifespan) Constituency | Term of office | | | Election (Term) | Party | Ministry | Chief Minister | Ref. |
| # | Portrait | Minister (Lifespan) Constituency | Term start | Term end | Duration | Election (Term) | Party | Ministry | Chief Minister | Ref. |
|---|---|---|---|---|---|---|---|---|---|---|
| 1 | | Pocharam Srinivas Reddy (born 1949); MLA for Banswada | 2 June 2014 | 6 September 2018 | 4 years, 96 days | 2014 (1st) | Telangana Rashtra Samithi | Rao I | Kalvakuntla Chandrashekhar Rao | |
| 2 | | Singireddy Niranjan Reddy (born 1958); MLA for Wanaparthy | 19 February 2019 | 3 December 2023 | 4 years, 287 days | 2018 (2nd) | Telangana Rashtra Samithi | Rao II | Kalvakuntla Chandrashekhar Rao | |
| 3 | | Thummala Nageswara Rao (born 1953); MLA for Khammam | 7 December 2023 | Incumbent | 2 years, 274 days | 2023 (3rd) | Indian National Congress | Reddy | Anumula Revanth Reddy | |
