= List of leaders of the opposition in the Telangana Legislative Assembly =

LoP in Telangana bicameral legislature

Leader of the Opposition in the Telangana Legislative Assembly
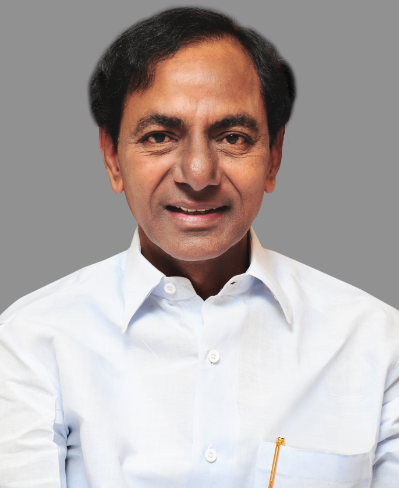
- Incumbent; Kalvakuntla Chandrashekar Rao since 16 December 2023
- Telangana Legislative Assembly
- Style: The Honourable
- Status: Leader of Opposition
- Member of: Telangana Legislative Assembly
- Residence: No Official Residence
- Nominator: Members of the Official Opposition in the Telangana Legislative Assembly
- Appointer: Speaker of the Telangana Legislative Assembly
- Term length: 5 years; no renewable limit
- Inaugural holder: Kunduru Jana Reddy
- Formation: 2 June 2014; (12 years, 171 days ago)
- Deputy: Deputy Leader of the Opposition
- Website: Leader of opposition telanganalagislature

This is a list of leaders of the opposition in the Telangana Legislative Assembly in the Telangana state of India.

== Leaders of the opposition ==
The current incumbent is Kalvakuntla Chandrashekar Rao of the Bharata Rashtra Samithi since 9 December 2023.

After the formation of the state in 2014, Kunduru Jana Reddy of Congress party became the first leader of opposition in Telangana Legislative Assembly.

No	Portrait	Name	Constituency	Tenure			Chief Minister	Party
1		Kunduru Jana Reddy	Nagarjuna Sagar	3 June 2014	6 September 2018	4 years, 95 days	K. Chandrashekar Rao	Indian National Congress
2		Mallu Bhatti Vikramarka	Madhira	20 January 2019	6 June 2019	139 days	K. Chandrashekar Rao	Indian National Congress
–	Vacant since no opposition party had 10% seats			6 June 2019	8 December 2023	4 years, 185 days	K. Chandrashekar Rao	N/A
3		K. Chandrashekar Rao	Gajwel	16 December 2023	Incumbent	2 years, 339 days	Revanth Reddy	Bharat Rashtra Samithi

== Eligibility ==
Officially, opposition is a term used in Telangana Legislative Assembly to designate the political party which has secured the second largest number of seats in the assembly. In order to get a formal recognition, the party must have at least 10% of total membership of the Legislative Assembly. A single party has to meet the 10% seat criterion, and not an alliance. Many of the Indian state legislatures also follows this 10% rule while the rest of them prefer single largest opposition party according to the rules of their respective houses.

== Role ==
The opposition's main role is to question the government of the day and hold them accountable to the public. The opposition is equally responsible in upholding the best interests of the people of the country. They have to ensure that the Government does not take any steps, which might have negative effects on the people of the country.

The role of the opposition in legislature is basically to check the excesses of the ruling or dominant party, and not to be totally antagonistic. There are actions of the ruling party which may be beneficial to the masses and opposition is expected to support such steps.

In legislature, opposition party has a major role and must act to discourage the party in power from acting against the interests of the country and the common man. They are expected to alert the population and the Government on the content of any bill, which is not in the best interests of the country.
