= First K. Chandrashekar Rao ministry =

Telangana Council of Ministers headed by K. Chandrashekar Rao (2014–2018)

- 1st Ministry of Telangana
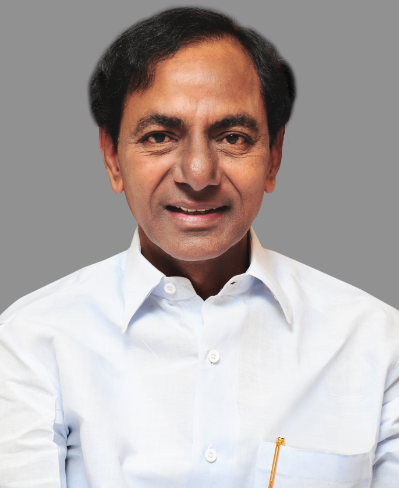
- K. Chandrashekar Rao
- Date formed: 2 June 2014
- Date dissolved: 12 December 2018

People and organisations
- Head of state: E.S.L. Narasimhan; Governor
- Head of government: K. Chandrashekhar Rao; Chief Minister
- No. of ministers: 18
- Ministers removed: 1
- Member parties: Telangana Rashtra Samithi
- Status in legislature: Majority
- Opposition party: Indian National Congress
- Opposition leader: K. Jana Reddy

History
- Election: 2014
- Outgoing election: 2009; United Andhra Pradesh
- Legislature term: 4 years
- Predecessor: Kiran Kumar Reddy ministry United Andhra Pradesh Council of Ministers
- Successor: Second K. Chandrashekar Rao ministry

The First K. Chandrashekar Rao ministry was the highest decision-making body of executive branch of the Government of Telangana, headed by the Chief Minister of Telangana. The 18-member cabinet is also its first, being sworn in by the Governor of Telangana on 2 June 2014, the day of the state's birth. It is headed by K. Chandrasekhar Rao of the Telangana Rashtra Samithi, the first Chief Minister of Telangana.

== Background ==
The first cabinet of the newly formed Indian state Telangana after bifurcating from the United Andhra Pradesh was formed on 2 June 2014. A 11 member cabinet was constituted initially by K. Chandrashekar Rao the elected chief minister in the 2014 Telangana Legislative Assembly election. On 16 December 2014 the cabinet was further expanded with inducting 6 members. On 25 June 2015 the then incumbent deputy chief minister and health minister T. Rajaiah was sacked from the council citing his charges of corruption in the medial and health department and indicating his involvement or ‘tacit ignorance’ of illegal actions in the department along with his incapability in handling the swine flu in the state. Kadiyam Srihari the member of parliament was then inducted into the council appointing him as the deputy chief minister and handing him over the duties of the education ministry. Along with this there was a minor cabinet reshuffling involving the transfer of ministries between C. Laxma Reddy and Guntakandla Jagadish Reddy.

== Council of Ministers ==
Key

- ^{RES} Resigned from office

Portfolio	Minister	Constituency	Tenure		Party
Portfolio	Minister	Constituency	Took office	Left office	Party
Chief Minister
Scheduled Tribes Welfare; Backward Classes Welfare; Energy	Kalvakuntla Chandrashekar Rao	Gajwel	2 June 2014	16 December 2014	TRS
Municipal Administration & Urban Development	Kalvakuntla Chandrashekar Rao	Gajwel	2 June 2014	7 February 2016	TRS
Scheduled Castes Welfare	Kalvakuntla Chandrashekar Rao	Gajwel	2 June 2014	9 February 2016	TRS
Minorities Welfare; Coal; General Administration; All other portfolios not allocated to any Minister	Kalvakuntla Chandrashekar Rao	Gajwel	2 June 2014	12 December 2018	TRS
Deputy Chief Ministers
Revenue; Relief & Rehabilitation; Urban Land Ceiling; Stamps & Registration	Mohammed Mahmood Ali	MLC	2 June 2014	12 December 2018	TRS
Medical & Health	Thatikonda Rajaiah	Ghanpur (Station) (SC)	2 June 2014	25 January 2015	TRS
Education	Kadiyam Srihari	MLC	25 January 2015	12 December 2018	TRS
Cabinet Ministers
Home; Prisons; Fire Services; Sainik Welfare; Labour & Employment	Nayani Narasimha Reddy	MLC	2 June 2014	12 December 2018	TRS
Finance & Planning; Small Savings; State Lotteries; Consumer Affairs; Legal Metrology; Civil Supplies	Etela Rajender	Huzurabad	2 June 2014	12 December 2018	TRS
Education	Guntakandla Jagadish Reddy	Suryapet	2 June 2014	25 January 2015	TRS
Energy	Guntakandla Jagadish Reddy	Suryapet	25 January 2015	12 December 2018	TRS
Scheduled Castes Development & Co-operation	Guntakandla Jagadish Reddy	Suryapet	9 February 2016	12 December 2018	TRS
Forest & Environment	Jogu Ramanna	Adilabad	2 June 2014	12 December 2018	TRS
Backward Classes Welfare	Jogu Ramanna	Adilabad	16 December 2014	12 December 2018	TRS
Irrigation; Marketing; Legislative Affairs	Thanneeru Harish Rao	Siddipet	2 June 2014	12 December 2018	TRS
Mines & Geology	Thanneeru Harish Rao	Siddipet	3 July 2014	12 December 2018	TRS
Panchayat Raj; Information Technology	Kalvakuntla Taraka Rama Rao	Sircilla	2 June 2014	12 December 2018	TRS
Municipal Administration and Urban Development	Kalvakuntla Taraka Rama Rao	Sircilla	7 February 2016	12 December 2018	TRS
Transport	Patnam Mahender Reddy	Tandur	2 June 2014	12 December 2018	TRS
Agriculture; Horticulture; Sericulture; Animal Husbandry; Fisheries; Dairy Development Corporation; Seeds Corporation	Pocharam Srinivas Reddy	Banswada	2 June 2014	12 December 2018	TRS
Excise & Prohibition	Thigulla Padma Rao Goud	Secunderabad	2 June 2014	12 December 2018	TRS
Sports and Youth Services	Thigulla Padma Rao Goud	Secunderabad	16 December 2014	12 December 2018	TRS
Energy	Charlakola Laxma Reddy	Jadcherla	16 December 2014	25 June 2015	TRS
Medical & Health	Charlakola Laxma Reddy	Jadcherla	25 January 2015	12 December 2018	TRS
Scheduled Tribes Development; Tourism & Culture	Azmeera Chandulal	Mulug (ST)	16 December 2014	12 December 2018	TRS
Industries; Handlooms & Textiles; Sugar	Jupally Krishna Rao	Kollapur	16 December 2014	12 December 2018	TRS
Roads & Buildings; Women & Child Development	Thummala Nageswara Rao	Palair	16 December 2014	12 December 2018	TRS
Housing; Law; Endowments	Allola Indrakaran Reddy	Nirmal	16 December 2014	12 December 2018	TRS
Commercial Taxes; Cinematography	Talasani Srinivas Yadav	Sanathnagar	16 December 2014	12 December 2018	TRS

== See also ==
- N. Kiran Kumar Reddy ministry
- Third N. Chandrababu Naidu ministry
