= Telangana Legislative Assembly =

Lower house of the Telangana Legislature

Telangana Legislative Assembly Telaṅgāṇa Śāsana Sabha
- 3rd Telangana Assembly

Type
- Type: Lower house of the Telangana Legislature
- Term limits: 5 years

History
- Founded: 9 June 2014 (12 years ago)
- Preceded by: Andhra Pradesh Legislative Assembly
- New session started: 9 December 2023

Leadership
- Speaker: Gaddam Prasad Kumar, INC since 14 December 2023
- Leader of the House (Chief Minister): Revanth Reddy, INC since 7 December 2023
- Deputy Leader of the House (Deputy Chief Minister): Mallu Bhatti Vikramarka, INC since 7 December 2023
- Leader of the Opposition: K. Chandrashekar Rao, BRS since 16 December 2023
- Secretary: Rendla Thirupathi since 26 December 2025

Structure
- Seats: 119
- Political groups: Government (76): INC (75); CPI (1); Opposition (42): BRS (27); AIMIM (7); BJP (7); IND (1); Vacant (1): Vacant (1)
- Length of term: 2023 – 2028

Elections
- Voting system: First past the post
- First election: 30 April 2014
- Last election: 30 November 2023
- Next election: November 2028

Meeting place
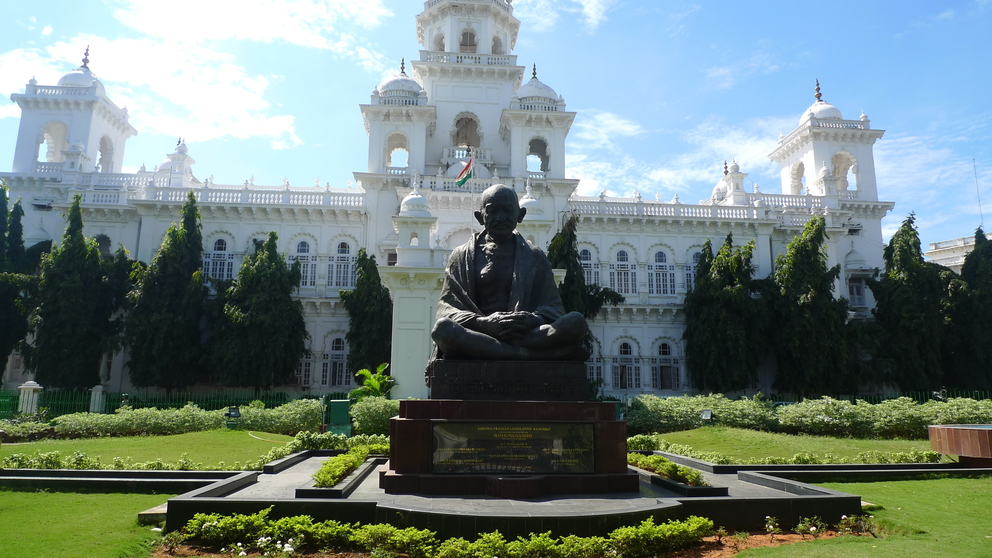
- Assembly Building, Hyderabad, Telangana

Website
- Telangana Legislative Assembly

The Telangana Legislative Assembly (ISO: Telangāṇa Śāsana Sabha) is the lower house of the Telangana Legislature in India. The Legislative Assembly of Telangana currently consists of 119 elected members.

The members of the Vidhana Sabha are directly elected by people through adult franchise. Each constituency elects one member of the assembly. Members are popularly known as M.L.A.s. The assembly is elected using the simple plurality or "first past the post" electoral system. The elections are conducted by the Election Commission of India.

== History ==
Telangana Legislative Assembly came into existence with 119 seats in June 2014 with the formation of Telangana. TRS swept the first election and formed the government with INC and TDP as opposition parties. In the 2018 elections, TRS won with a greater majority. There was one nominated member from the Anglo-India community till 2023. INC formed the government in 2023 with BRS and BJP as opposition parties.

== Election Process ==
The duration of the Assembly is five years from the date appointed for its first meeting, unless it is decided to dissolve the Assembly sooner. The Legislative Assembly's main functions include legislation, overseeing of administration, passing the budget, and airing public grievances.

There are currently 119 MLAs in the legislative assembly elected by the people. The state is divided into 119 constituencies with roughly equal populations. Every 5 years the assembly is up for election. However election can happen earlier if:

1. Failure to govern the state under the constitution
2. Inability of anyone to command majority support in the house for more than one month
3. Unopposed decision of cabinet to dissolve the house

== Composition ==
The current assembly is the third Legislative Assembly of Telangana.

=== Presiding officers ===
Designation	Name
Governor	Shiv Pratap Shukla
Speaker	Gaddam Prasad Kumar (INC)
Leader of the House (Chief Minister)	Revanth Reddy (INC)
Leader of the Opposition	K. Chandrashekar Rao (BRS)

=== Members ===
As of November 2025
Party	Members
Indian National Congress	76
Bharat Rashtra Samithi	27
Bharatiya Janata Party	7
All India Majlis-e-Ittehadul Muslimeen	7
Communist Party of India	1
Independent politician	1
Total	119

== List of the assemblies ==
Assembly (Election)	Ruling Party	Chief Minister	Deputy Chief Minister	Speaker	Deputy Speaker	Leader of the House	Leader of the Opposition
1st (2014)	Telangana Rashtra Samithi	K. Chandrashekar Rao	M. Mahmood Ali T. Rajaiah Kadiyam Srihari	Madhusudhana Chary Sirikonda	M. Padma Devender Reddy	K. Chandrashekar Rao	Kunduru Jana Reddy
2nd (2018)	Bharat Rashtra Samithi	K. Chandrashekar Rao	Vacant	Srinivas Reddy Parige (Pocharam)	T. Padma Rao	K. Chandrashekar Rao	Mallu Bhatti Vikramarka
2nd (2018)	Bharat Rashtra Samithi	K. Chandrashekar Rao	Vacant	Srinivas Reddy Parige (Pocharam)	T. Padma Rao	K. Chandrashekar Rao	Vacant (Note: No official opposition because no political party obtained at least 10% of the seats in the assembly)
3rd (2023)	Indian National Congress	Anumula Revanth Reddy	Mallu Bhatti Vikramarka	Gaddam Prasad Kumar		Anumula Revanth Reddy	K. Chandrashekar Rao

== Members of Legislative Assembly ==
Source
District	No.	Constituency	Name	Party	Remarks
Kumuram Bheem Asifabad	1	Sirpur	Palvai Harish Babu	Bharatiya Janata Party	BJP Deputy Floor Leader
Mancherial	2	Chennur (SC)	Gaddam Vivek Venkatswamy	Indian National Congress	
Mancherial	3	Bellampalli (SC)	Gaddam Vinod	Indian National Congress	
Mancherial	4	Mancherial	Kokkirala Premsagar Rao	Indian National Congress	
Kumuram Bheem Asifabad	5	Asifabad (ST)	Kova Laxmi	Bharat Rashtra Samithi	
Nirmal	6	Khanapur (ST)	Vedma Bhojju	Indian National Congress	
Adilabad	7	Adilabad	Payal Shanker	Bharatiya Janata Party	
Adilabad	8	Boath (ST)	Anil Jadhav	Bharat Rashtra Samithi	
Nirmal	9	Nirmal	Alleti Maheshwar Reddy	Bharatiya Janata Party	BJP Floor Leader
Nirmal	10	Mudhole	Pawar Ramarao Patel	Bharatiya Janata Party	
Nizamabad	11	Armur	Paidi Rakesh Reddy	Bharatiya Janata Party	
Nizamabad	12	Bodhan	Podduturi Sudarshan Reddy	Indian National Congress	
Kamareddy	13	Jukkal (SC)	Thota Laxmi Kantha Rao	Indian National Congress	
Nizamabad	14	Banswada	Pocharam Srinivas Reddy	Bharat Rashtra Samithi	Defected BRS to join INC
Nizamabad	14	Banswada	Pocharam Srinivas Reddy	Indian National Congress	Defected BRS to join INC
Kamareddy	15	Yellareddy	K. Madan Mohan Rao	Indian National Congress	
Kamareddy	16	Kamareddy	K. V. Ramana Reddy	Bharatiya Janata Party	BJP Deputy Floor Leader
Nizamabad	17	Nizamabad Urban)	Dhanpal Suryanarayana Gupta	Bharatiya Janata Party	
Nizamabad	18	Nizamabad Rural	Rekulapally Bhoopathi Reddy	Indian National Congress	
Nizamabad	19	Balkonda	Vemula Prashanth Reddy	Bharat Rashtra Samithi	
Jagital	20	Koratla	Kalvakuntla Sanjay	Bharat Rashtra Samithi	
Jagital	21	Jagtial	M. Sanjay Kumar	Bharat Rashtra Samithi	Defected BRS to join INC
Jagital	21	Jagtial	M. Sanjay Kumar	Indian National Congress	Defected BRS to join INC
Jagital	22	Dharmapuri	Adluri Laxman Kumar	Indian National Congress	
Peddapalli	23	Ramagundam	Makkan Singh Raj Thakur	Indian National Congress	
Peddapalli	24	Manthani	Duddilla Sridhar Babu	Indian National Congress	Cabinet Minister
Peddapalli	25	Peddapalle	Chinthakunta Vijaya Ramana Rao	Indian National Congress	
Karimnagar	26	Karimnagar	Gangula Kamalakar	Bharat Rashtra Samithi	
Karimnagar	27	Choppadandi (SC)	Medipally Sathyam	Indian National Congress	
Rajanna Sircilla	28	Vemulawada	Aadi Srinivas	Indian National Congress	
Rajanna Sircilla	29	Sircilla	K. T. Rama Rao	Bharat Rashtra Samithi	
Karimnagar	30	Manakondur (SC)	Kavvampally Satyanarayana	Indian National Congress	
Karimnagar	31	Huzurabad	Padi Kaushik Reddy	Bharat Rashtra Samithi	
Siddipet	32	Husnabad	Ponnam Prabhakar	Indian National Congress	Cabinet Minister
Siddipet	33	Siddipet	T. Harish Rao	Bharat Rashtra Samithi	
Medak	34	Medak	Mynampally Rohith	Indian National Congress	
Sangareddy	35	Narayankhed	Patlolla Sanjeeva Reddy	Indian National Congress	
Sangareddy	36	Andole (SC)	Damodar Raja Narasimha	Indian National Congress	Cabinet Minister
Medak	37	Narsapur	Vakiti Sunitha Laxma Reddy	Bharat Rashtra Samithi	
Sangareddy	38	Zahirabad (SC)	Koninty Manik Rao	Bharat Rashtra Samithi	
Sangareddy	39	Sangareddy	Chinta Prabhakar	Bharat Rashtra Samithi	
Sangareddy	40	Patancheru	Gudem Mahipal Reddy	Bharat Rashtra Samithi	Defected BRS to join INC
Sangareddy	40	Patancheru	Gudem Mahipal Reddy	Indian National Congress	Defected BRS to join INC
Siddipet	41	Dubbak	Kotha Prabhakar Reddy	Bharat Rashtra Samithi	
Siddipet	42	Gajwel	K. Chandrashekar Rao	Bharat Rashtra Samithi	Leader of Opposition
Medchal Malkajgiri	43	Medchal	Malla Reddy	Bharat Rashtra Samithi	
Medchal Malkajgiri	44	Malkajgiri	Marri Rajasekhar Reddy	Bharat Rashtra Samithi	
Medchal Malkajgiri	45	Quthbullapur	K. P. Vivekanand Goud	Bharat Rashtra Samithi	
Medchal Malkajgiri	46	Kukatpally	Madhavaram Krishna Rao	Bharat Rashtra Samithi	
Medchal Malkajgiri	47	Uppal	Bandari Lakshma Reddy	Bharat Rashtra Samithi	
Ranga Reddy	48	Ibrahimpatnam	Malreddy Ranga Reddy	Indian National Congress	
Ranga Reddy	49	L. B. Nagar	Devireddy Sudheer Reddy	Bharat Rashtra Samithi	
Ranga Reddy	50	Maheshwaram	Sabitha Indra Reddy	Bharat Rashtra Samithi	
Ranga Reddy	51	Rajendranagar	T. Prakash Goud	Bharat Rashtra Samithi	Defected BRS to join INC
Ranga Reddy	51	Rajendranagar	T. Prakash Goud	Indian National Congress	Defected BRS to join INC
Ranga Reddy	52	Serilingampally	Arekapudi Gandhi	Bharat Rashtra Samithi	Defected BRS to join INC
Ranga Reddy	52	Serilingampally	Arekapudi Gandhi	Indian National Congress	Defected BRS to join INC
Ranga Reddy	53	Chevella (SC)	Kale Yadaiah	Bharat Rashtra Samithi	Defected BRS to join INC
Ranga Reddy	53	Chevella (SC)	Kale Yadaiah	Indian National Congress	Defected BRS to join INC
Vikarabad	54	Pargi	T. Ram Mohan Reddy	Indian National Congress	
Vikarabad	55	Vikarabad (SC)	Gaddam Prasad Kumar	Indian National Congress	
Vikarabad	56	Tandur	B. Manohar Reddy	Indian National Congress	
Hyderabad	57	Musheerabad	Muta Gopal	Bharat Rashtra Samithi	
Hyderabad	58	Malakpet	Ahmed Bin Abdullah Balala	All India Majlis-e-Ittehadul Muslimeen	
Hyderabad	59	Amberpet	Kaleru Venkatesh	Bharat Rashtra Samithi	
Hyderabad	60	Khairatabad	Danam Nagender	Bharat Rashtra Samithi	Defected BRS to join INC and disqualified by the High Court effective 23 April 2024
Hyderabad	60	Khairatabad	Danam Nagender	Indian National Congress	Defected BRS to join INC and disqualified by the High Court effective 23 April 2024
Hyderabad	60	Khairatabad	Vacant		Defected BRS to join INC and disqualified by the High Court effective 23 April 2024
Hyderabad	61	Jubilee Hills	Maganti Gopinath	Bharat Rashtra Samithi	Died on 08 June 2025
Hyderabad	61	Jubilee Hills	Vallala Naveen Yadav	Indian National Congress	Won By-election
Hyderabad	62	Sanathnagar	Talasani Srinivas Yadav	Bharat Rashtra Samithi	
Hyderabad	63	Nampally	Mohammad Majid Hussain	All India Majlis-e-Ittehadul Muslimeen	
Hyderabad	64	Karwan	Kausar Mohiuddin	All India Majlis-e-Ittehadul Muslimeen	
Hyderabad	65	Goshamahal	T. Raja Singh	Bharatiya Janata Party	
Hyderabad	65	Goshamahal	T. Raja Singh	Independent	Resigned from BJP in 2025
Hyderabad	66	Charminar	Mir Zulfeqar Ali	All India Majlis-e-Ittehadul Muslimeen	
Hyderabad	67	Chandrayangutta	Akbaruddin Owaisi	All India Majlis-e-Ittehadul Muslimeen	AIMIM Floor Leader
Hyderabad	68	Yakutpura	Jaffer Hussain	All India Majlis-e-Ittehadul Muslimeen	
Hyderabad	69	Bahadurpura	Mohammed Mubeen	All India Majlis-e-Ittehadul Muslimeen	
Hyderabad	70	Secunderabad	T. Padma Rao Goud	Bharat Rashtra Samithi	
Hyderabad	71	Secunderabad Cantt. (SC)	G. Lasya Nanditha	Bharat Rashtra Samithi	Died on 23 February 2024
Hyderabad	71	Secunderabad Cantt. (SC)	Narayanan Sri Ganesh	Indian National Congress	Won By-election
Vikarabad	72	Kodangal	Anumula Revanth Reddy	Indian National Congress	Chief Minister of Telangana
Narayanpet	73	Narayanpet	Chittem Parnika Reddy	Indian National Congress	
Mahabubnagar	74	Mahbubnagar	Yennam Srinivas Reddy	Indian National Congress	
Mahabubnagar	75	Jadcherla	Janampalli Anirudh Reddy	Indian National Congress	
Mahabubnagar	76	Devarkadra	Gavinolla Madhusudan Reddy	Indian National Congress	
Narayanpet	77	Makthal	Vakiti Srihari	Indian National Congress	
Wanaparthy	78	Wanaparthy	Tudi Megha Reddy	Indian National Congress	
Jogulamba Gadwal	79	Gadwal	Bandla Krishna Mohan Reddy	Bharat Rashtra Samithi	
Jogulamba Gadwal	80	Alampur (SC)	Vijayudu	Bharat Rashtra Samithi	
Nagarkurnool	81	Nagarkurnool	Kuchkulla Rajesh Reddy	Indian National Congress	
Nagarkurnool	82	Achampet (SC)	Chikkudu Vamshi Krishna	Indian National Congress	
Ranga Reddy	83	Kalwakurthy	Kasireddy Narayan Reddy	Indian National Congress	
Ranga Reddy	84	Shadnagar	K. Shankaraiah	Indian National Congress	
Nagarkurnool	85	Kollapur	Jupally Krishna Rao	Indian National Congress	Cabinet Minister
Nalgonda	86	Devarakonda (ST)	Nenavath Balu Naik	Indian National Congress	
Nalgonda	87	Nagarjuna Sagar	Kunduru Jayaveer Reddy	Indian National Congress	
Nalgonda	88	Miryalaguda	Bathula Laxma Reddy	Indian National Congress	
Suryapet	89	Huzurnagar	Nalamada Uttam Kumar Reddy	Indian National Congress	Cabinet Minister
Suryapet	90	Kodad	Nalamada Padmavathi Reddy	Indian National Congress	
Suryapet	91	Suryapet	Guntakandla Jagadish Reddy	Bharat Rashtra Samithi	
Nalgonda	92	Nalgonda	Komatireddy Venkat Reddy	Indian National Congress	Cabinet Minister
Nalgonda	93	Munugode	Komatireddy Raj Gopal Reddy	Indian National Congress	
Yadadri Bhuvanagiri	94	Bhongir	Kumbam Anil Kumar Reddy	Indian National Congress	
Nalgonda	95	Nakrekal (SC)	Vemula Veeresham	Indian National Congress	
Suryapet	96	Thungathurthi (SC)	Mandula Samuel	Indian National Congress	
Yadadri Bhuvanagiri	97	Alair	Beerla Ilaiah	Indian National Congress	
Jangoan	98	Jangaon	Palla Rajeshwar Reddy	Bharat Rashtra Samithi	
Jangoan	99	Ghanpur (Station) (SC)	Kadiyam Srihari	Bharat Rashtra Samithi	Defected BRS to join INC
Jangoan	99	Ghanpur (Station) (SC)	Kadiyam Srihari	Indian National Congress	Defected BRS to join INC
Jangoan	100	Palakurthi	Mamidala Yashaswini Reddy	Indian National Congress	
Mahabubabad	101	Dornakal (ST)	Jatoth Ram Chander Naik	Indian National Congress	
Mahabubabad	102	Mahabubabad (ST)	Murali Naik Bhukya	Indian National Congress	
Warangal Rural	103	Narsampet	Donthi Madhava Reddy	Indian National Congress	
Warangal Rural	104	Parkal	Revuri Prakash Reddy	Indian National Congress	
Warangal Rural	105	Warangal West	Naini Rajender Reddy	Indian National Congress	
Warangal Rural	106	Warangal East	Konda Surekha	Indian National Congress	Cabinet Minister
Warangal Rural	107	Waradhanapet (SC)	K. R. Nagaraj	Indian National Congress	
Jayashankar Bhupalpalle	108	Bhupalpalle	Gandra Satyanarayana Rao	Indian National Congress	
Mulug	109	Mulug (ST)	Dansari Anasuya (Seethakka)	Indian National Congress	Cabinet Minister
Bhadradri Kothagudem	110	Pinapaka (ST)	Payam Venkateswarlu	Indian National Congress	
Bhadradri Kothagudem	111	Yellandu (ST)	Koram Kanakaiah	Indian National Congress	
Khammam	112	Khammam	Thummala Nageswara Rao	Indian National Congress	Cabinet Minister
Khammam	113	Palair	Ponguleti Srinivasa Reddy	Indian National Congress	Cabinet Minister
Khammam	114	Madhira (SC)	Mallu Bhatti Vikramarka	Indian National Congress	Deputy Chief Minister Of Telangana.
Khammam	115	Wyra (ST)	Maloth Ramdas	Indian National Congress	
Khammam	116	Sathupalli (SC)	Matta Ragamayee	Indian National Congress	
Bhadradri Kothagudem	117	Kothagudem	Kunamneni Sambasiva Rao	Communist Party of India	
Bhadradri Kothagudem	118	Aswaraopeta (ST)	Jare Adinarayana	Indian National Congress	
Bhadradri Kothagudem	119	Bhadrachalam (ST)	Tellam Venkata Rao	Bharat Rashtra Samithi	Defected BRS to join INC
Bhadradri Kothagudem	119	Bhadrachalam (ST)	Tellam Venkata Rao	Indian National Congress	Defected BRS to join INC

== Past Composition ==
2018–2023

1	19	2	88	7	1	1
AIFB	INC	TDP	TRS	AIMIM	BJP	Ind

2023–Present

1	64	39	7	8
CPI	INC	TRS	AIMIM	BJP

== See also ==
- Telangana Legislative Council
- List of constituencies of Telangana Legislative Assembly
- List of governors of Telangana
- List of chief ministers of Telangana
- List of deputy chief ministers of Telangana
- 2023 Telangana Legislative Assembly election
- 2018 Telangana Legislative Assembly election
- 2014 Telangana Legislative Assembly election
