= List of speakers of the Telangana Legislative Assembly =

Presiding officer of Telangana legislative assembly

Speaker of Telangana Legislative Assembly
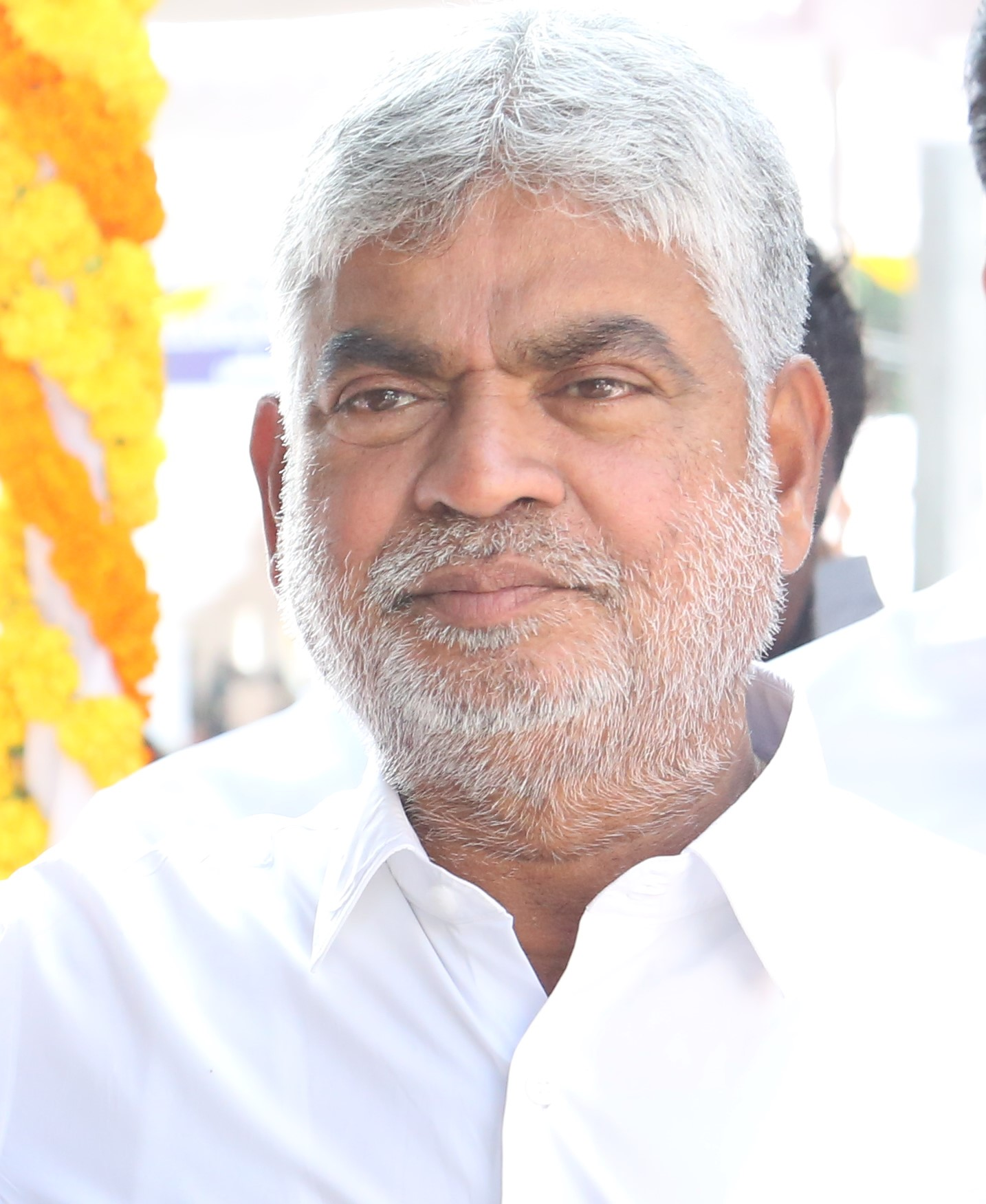
- Incumbent; Gaddam Prasad Kumar since 14 December 2023
- Type: Speaker
- Status: Presiding Officer of Telangana Legislative Assembly
- Appointer: Members of Telangana Legislative Assembly
- Term length: 5 years no renewable limit
- Inaugural holder: S. Madhusudhana Chary
- Formation: 9 June 2014; 12 years ago
- Deputy: Jatoth Ram Chander Naik (since 8 June 2025)
- Website: Speaker of Telangana assembly

In the Republic of India, the various central and state legislatures are presided by either a Speaker or a Chairman. The Speaker is elected in the very first meeting of the Telangana Legislative Assembly after the General elections for a term of 5 years from amongst the members of the Saasana Sabha. The Speaker holds office until either they ceases to be a member of the Saasana Sabha or he himself resigns. The Speaker can be removed from office by a resolution passed in the Saasana Sabha by an effective majority of its members. In the absence of a Speaker, the meeting of Telangana Legislative Assembly is presided over by the Deputy Speaker.

== List of Speakers of the Telangana Legislative Assembly ==
Serial No.	Portrait	Name (Birth–Death)	Constituency	Tenure			Assembly (election)	Party
Telangana (2 June 2014–present)
1		S. Madhusudhana Chary (1956–)	Bhupalpalle	10 June 2014	17 January 2019	4 years, 224 days	1st (2014)	Telangana Rashtra Samithi
2		Pocharam Srinivas Reddy (1949–)	Banswada	18 January 2019	9 December 2023	4 years, 325 days	2nd (2018)	Telangana Rashtra Samithi
3		Gaddam Prasad Kumar (1964–)	Vikarabad	14 December 2023	Incumbent	2 years, 341 days	3rd (2023)	Indian National Congress

== List of Deputy Speakers ==
S. No.	Name	Took office	Left office	Party	Chief Minister
1	Padma Devender Reddy	12 June 2014	16 January 2019	Telangana Rashtra Samithi	K. Chandrashekar Rao
2	T. Padma Rao Goud	24 February 2019	6 December 2023	Telangana Rashtra Samithi	K. Chandrashekar Rao
3	Jatoth Ram Chander Naik	8 June 2025	Incumbent	Indian National Congress	Revanth Reddy

== List of the Pro tem Speakers of Telangana ==
No.	Name	Constituency	Term	Party	Assembly (Election)	Seniority
1	Jana Reddy Kunduru	Nagarjuna Sagar	2014	Indian National Congress	1st Assembly (2014)	10 terms
2	Mumtaz Ahmed Khan	Yakutpura	2019	All India Majlis-e-Ittehadul Muslimeen	2nd Assembly (2018)	06 terms
3	Akbaruddin Owaisi	Chandrayangutta	2023	All India Majlis-e-Ittehadul Muslimeen	3rd Assembly (2023)	06 terms
