= Gaddam Prasad Kumar =

Indian politician

Gaddam Prasad Kumar గడ్డం ప్రసాద్ కుమార్
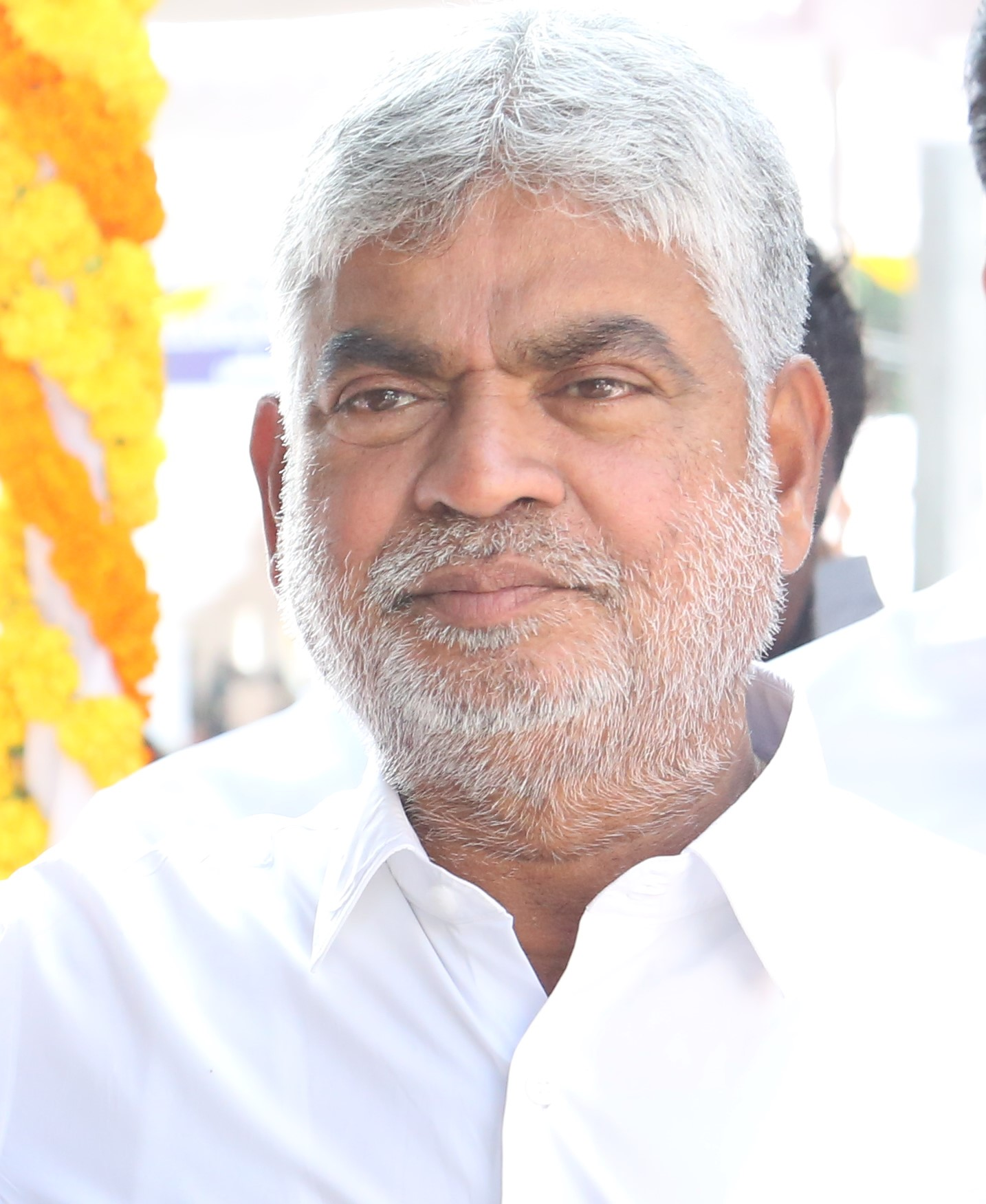

Speaker of Telangana Legislative Assembly
- Incumbent
- Assumed office 14 December 2023
- Governor: Tamilisai Soundararajan; C.P. Radhakrishnan (additional charge); Jishnu Dev Varma
- Chief Minister and Deputy CM: Revanth Reddy; Mallu Bhatti Vikaramaka
- Deputy Speakar: Jatoth Ram Chander Naik
- Preceded by: Pocharam Srinivas Reddy

Member of Legislative Assembly, Telangana
- Incumbent
- Assumed office 2023
- Preceded by: Anand Methuku
- Constituency: Vikarabad

Minister of Handlooms & Textiles, Spinning Mills and Small Scale Industries Government of Andhra Pradesh
- In office 2012–2014
- Governor: E. S. L. Narasimhan
- Chief Minister: Kiran Kumar Reddy
- Preceded by: P. Shankar Rao
- Succeeded by: Office Dissolved

Member of Legislative Assembly Andhra Pradesh
- In office 2009–2014
- Preceded by: A Chandrashekhar
- Succeeded by: B. Sanjeeva Rao
- Constituency: Vikarabad

Personal details
- Born: 4 June 1964 Vikarabad, Andhra Pradesh (present day Telangana, India)
- Party: Indian National Congress
- Spouse: Shailaja
- Children: 2

Gaddam Prasad Kumar is an Indian politician currently serving as the 3rd Speaker of the Telangana Legislative Assembly since 2023. He represents Vikarabad in the Telangana Legislative Assembly. He is a former Member of Andhra Pradesh Legislative Assembly. He belongs to Indian National Congress.

== Early life ==
Gaddam Prasad Kumar was born in Vikarabad, Ranga Reddy district, Andhra Pradesh, India. Gaddam Prasad Kumar belongs to the Mala community, a Scheduled Caste (SC) group.

== Career ==
Gaddam Prasad Kumar was elected to Vikrabad constituency in 2009 Assembly elections from Ranga Reddy district defeating A. Chandrashkhar of Telangana Rashtra Samithi party. In 2012 he was inducted into the Cabinet of N Kiran Kumar Reddy as Minister for Handlooms & Textiles, Spinning Mills & Small Scale Industries. He was appointed Congress party campaign coordinator for the 2012 byelections in 12 Assembly constituencies in Andhra Pradesh.

After the State Bifurcation in 2014 he lost to the Telangana Rashtra Samithi candidate B. Sanjeev Rao in 2014, and to Dr. M Anand in 2018 Telangana Assembly Elections.

Gaddam Prasad Kumar defeated Methuku Anand of BRS party in the 2023 Assembly Elections. The Congress has finalized Gaddam Prasad for the post of Telangana assembly speaker on 7 December and filed his nomination on 13 December in the presence of Chief Minister Revanth Reddy.

G. Prasad Kumar unanimously elected as Speaker of Telangana Legislative Assembly and took charge on 14 December 2023.
