= Sudarshan Akarapu =

Indian politician

Akarapu Sudarshan

Former Member of Legislative Assembly
- Constituency: Suryapet

Personal details
- Born: 5 March 1954 Hyderabad State, India
- Died: 20 July 2011 (aged 57)
- Party: Telugu Desam Party
- Children: Ramesh Akarapu

Shri Sudarshan Akarapu (Telugu: ఆకారపు సుదర్శన్; 5 March 1954 – 20 July 2011) was an Indian politician from Telugu Desam Party. He was former Rajya Sabha Member of Parliament, former Member of Legislative Assembly and TDP vice president. He died with a massive heart attack on 20 July 2011 in a private hospital in Hyderabad.

== Early life ==
Sudarshan was born in Bandaramaram Suryapet, Nalgonda district, Telangana, India. He has three daughters and one son.

== Political career ==
Akarapu Sudarshan first came up with the ideology of socialism and joined CPI first. The Communist Party of India (CPI) is the oldest communist party in India and one of the eight national parties in the country. He was elected as MLA (two terms) from Suryapet Assembly Constituency in 1989 and 1994 from TDP and also served as chairman of the Andhra Pradesh State Road Transport Corporation (APSRTC) from 1997 to 1999. Sudarshan was Rajya Sabha MP from 2002 to 2008 and served a full six-year term. During his stint as MP, he also served as a member on various parliamentary standing committees.
