= Guntakandla Jagadish Reddy =

Indian politician

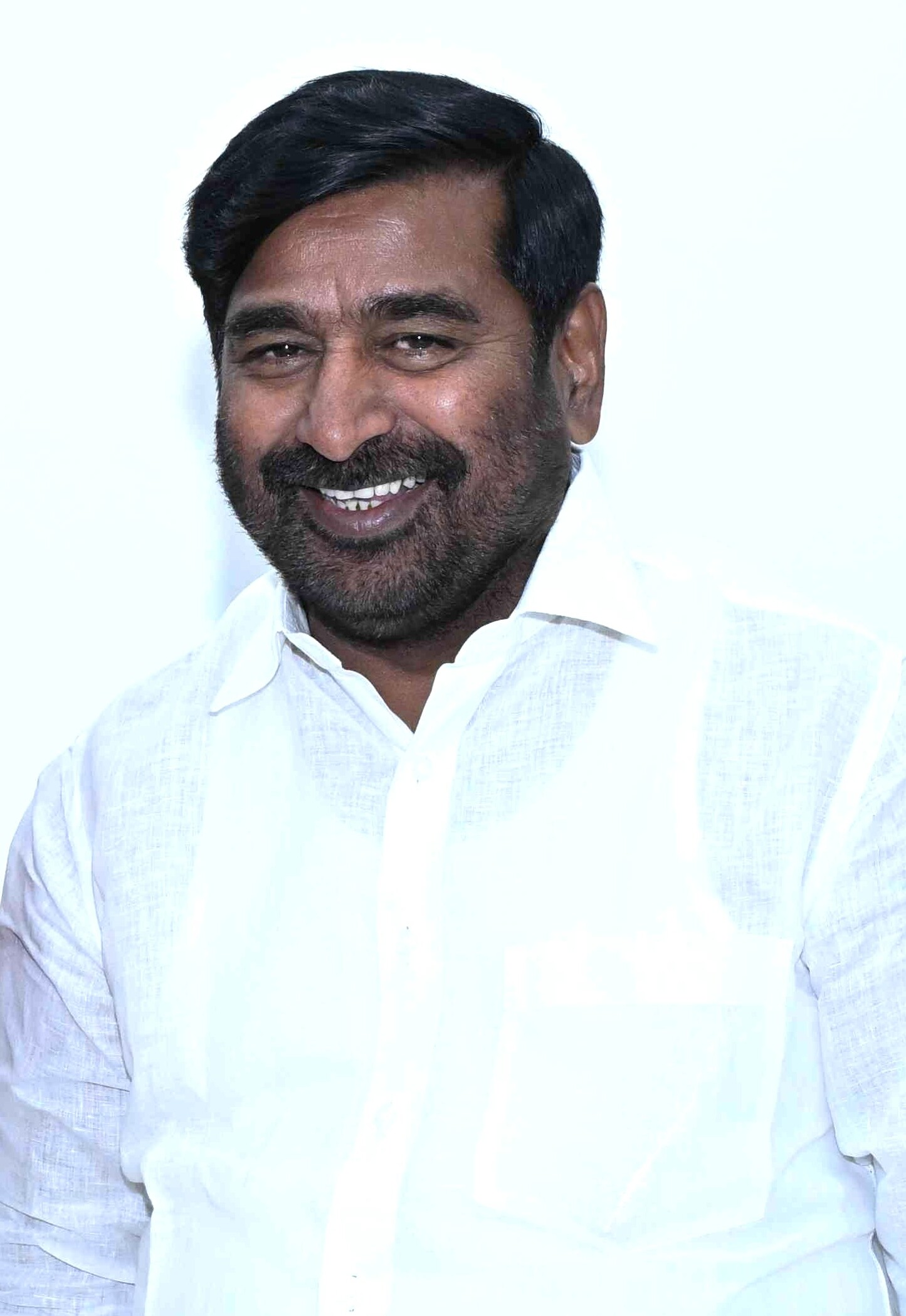

Member of the Telangana Legislative Assembly
- Incumbent
- Assumed office 2 June 2014
- Preceded by: Ramreddy Damodar Reddy
- Constituency: Suryapeta

Minister of Energy Government of Telangana
- In office 25 June 2015 – December 2023
- Preceded by: C. Laxma Reddy

Minister of Education Government of Telangana
- In office 2 June 2014 – 25 June 2015
- Preceded by: Office Established
- Succeeded by: Kadiyam Srihari

Personal details
- Born: 18 July 1965 (age 61) Nagaram, Nalgonda district, Andhra Pradesh (present–day Suryapet district, Telangana), India
- Party: Telangana Rashtra Samithi
- Spouse: Sunita Reddy
- Children: Veman Reddy, Lahari Reddy
- Parent(s): Ramchandra Reddy (Father); Savithri (died in 2014) (Mother)

Guntakandla Jagadish Reddy (born 18 July 1965), often referred to by his initials, GJR, is an Indian politician who served as the Minister of Energy of Telangana from 25 June 2015 to December 2023 and also served as Minister of Education of Telangana from 2 June 2014 to 25 June 2015. He is a Member of the Telangana Legislative Assembly from Suryapet constituency. He is also a member of TRS party politbureau.

== Early life ==
Born to Ramachandra Reddy and Savithri in Nagaram Village, Arvapally Mandal, Suryapet district, Telangana State, India, he has four siblings. He graduated as a B.A. from Sri Venkateshwar Degree College, Suryapet (Osmania University) in 1985. He did his Bachelor of Law from Siddartha Law College, Vijayawada, Nagarjuna University. He stood as a student leader, activist and emerged as a political leader.

== Career ==
He was a practicing lawyer in Nalgonda district court. He was the 1st BAR Association President of the Nalgonda district.

=== Politics ===
He joined Telangana movement in 2001 and was one of the early members in Telangana Rashtra Samithi.

He contested from Huzurnagar constituency in 2009 and later in 2014 General elections from Suryapet Assembly Constituency and won the election. He won the Suryapet assembly constituency for the second time in 2018 Telangana assembly elections. He was elected as MLA for third time in 2023.

Jagadish Reddy was suspended from Telangana Assembly for remarks against Speaker on 13 March 2025 till rest of the Budget session.

Political offices
Preceded by Position Established	Energy Ministry of Telangana; 2014– 2018	Incumbent
