= Suryapet Assembly constituency =

Constituency of the Telangana legislative assembly in India

Coordinates: 17.14°N 79.63°E

Suryapet
- Constituency No. 91 for the Telangana Legislative Assembly
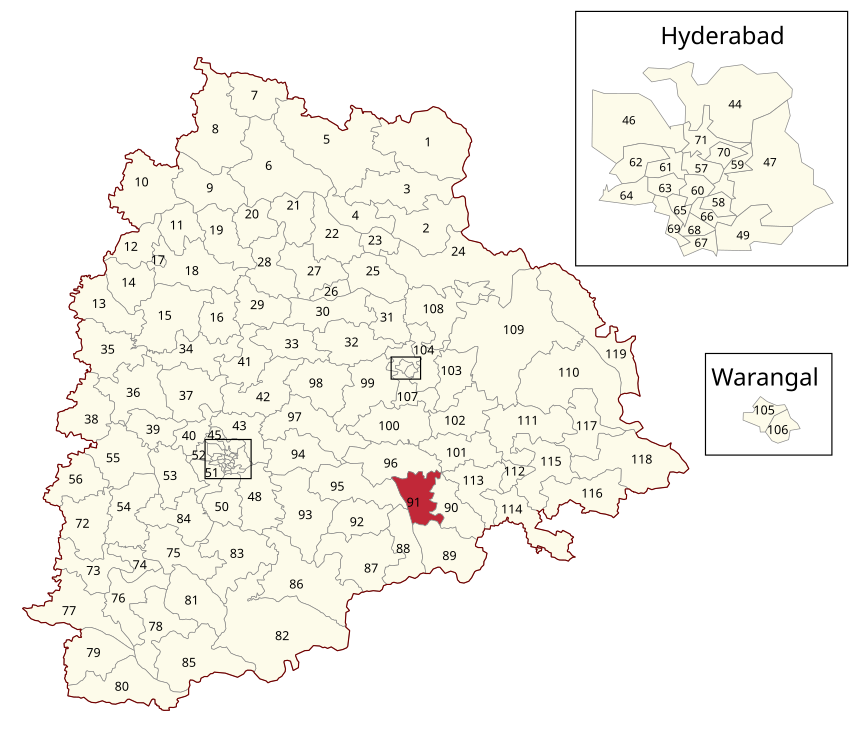
- Location of Suryapet Assembly constituency within Telangana

Constituency details
- Country: India
- Region: South India
- State: Telangana
- District: Suryapet
- Lok Sabha constituency: Nalgonda
- Established: 1951
- Total electors: 2,22,769
- Reservation: None

Member of Legislative Assembly
- 3rd Telangana Legislative Assembly
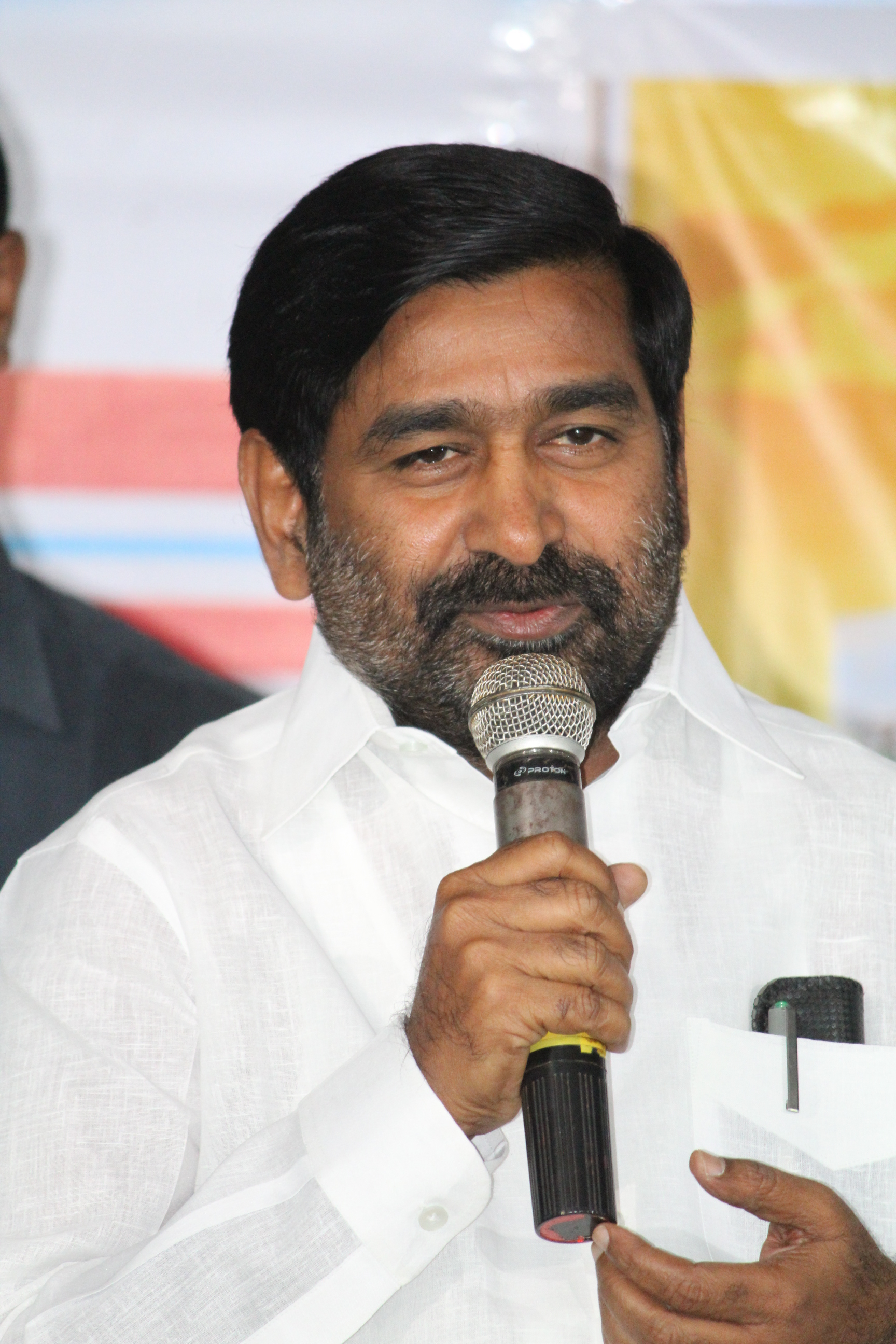
- Incumbent Guntakandla Jagadish Reddy
- Party: Bharat Rashtra Samithi
- Elected year: 2023

Suryapet Assembly constituency is a constituency of the Telangana Legislative Assembly that includes the city of Suryapet. It is one of the four constituencies in Suryapet district. It has been part of Nalgonda Lok Sabha constituency since 2009.

As of 2023, Guntakandla Jagadish Reddy of Bharat Rashtra Samithi represents the constituency.

== Extent of the constituency ==
The assembly constituency comprises the following mandals:

Mandal
Suryapet
Athmakur (S)
Chivemla
Penpahad

== Members of the Legislative Assembly ==
Assembly	Duration	Name of MLA	Party
Hyderabad Legislative Assembly (Gen.)	1952-56	Bommagani Dharma Bhiksham	People's Democratic Front
Hyderabad Legislative Assembly (Res.)	1952-56	Uppala Malsoor	People's Democratic Front
Second AP Legislative Assembly (Gen.)	1957-62	Bheemireddi Narasimha Reddy	People's Democratic Front
Third AP Legislative Assembly	1962-67	Uppala Malsoor	Communist Party of India
Fourth AP Legislative Assembly	1967-72	Uppala Malsoor	Communist Party of India
Fifth AP Legislative Assembly	1972-78	Yedla Gopaiah	Indian National Congress
Sixth AP Legislative Assembly	1978-83	Annumulapuri Parandamulu	Indian National Congress
Seventh AP Legislative Assembly	1983-85	Eda Deviah	Telugu Desam Party
Eighth AP Legislative Assembly	1985-89	Daida Sundaraiah	Telugu Desam Party
Ninth AP Legislative Assembly	1989-94	Akarapu Sudarshan	Telugu Desam Party
Tenth AP Legislative Assembly	1994-99	Akarapu Sudarshan	Telugu Desam Party
Eleventh AP Legislative Assembly	1999-04	Dosapati Gopal	Indian National Congress
Twelfth AP Legislative Assembly	2004-09	Vedasu Venkaiah	Indian National Congress
Thirteenth AP Legislative Assembly	2009-14	Ramreddy Damodar Reddy	Indian National Congress
First TS Legislative Assembly	2014-18	Guntakandla Jagadish Reddy	Bharat Rashtra Samithi
Second TS Legislative Assembly	2018-2023	Guntakandla Jagadish Reddy	Bharat Rashtra Samithi
Third TS Legislative Assembly	2023-incumbent	Guntakandla Jagadish Reddy	Bharat Rashtra Samithi

== Election results ==
=== Telangana Legislative Assembly election, 2023 ===
Telangana Assembly Elections, 2023: Suryapet (Assembly constituency)
Party	Candidate	Votes	%	±%
BRS	Guntakandla Jagadish Reddy	75,143	36.36	
INC	Ramreddy Damodar Reddy	70,537	34.13	
BJP	Sankineni Venkateswar Rao	40,407	19.55	
BSP	Vatte Janaiah Yadav	13,907	6.73	
Independent	Marri Nehemiah	1,072	0.52	
Independent	Maram Venkat Reddy	961	0.46	
NOTA	None of the Above	774	0.37	
Majority		4,606	2.23	
Turnout		2,06,669		
BRS hold		Swing		

=== Telangana Legislative Assembly election, 2018 ===
Telangana Assembly Elections, 2018: Suryapet (Assembly constituency)
Party	Candidate	Votes	%	±%
TRS	Guntakandla Jagadish Reddy	68,650	37.34	
INC	Ramreddy Damodar Reddy	62,683	34.10	
BJP	Sankineni Venkateswar Rao	39,240	21.35	
Independent	Dongari Venu	4,871	2.65	
Independent	Perumalla Venkanna	1,875	1.02	
NOTA	None of the above	820	0.45	
Majority		5,967	3.24	
Turnout		1,83,832	87.08	
TRS hold		Swing		

=== Telangana Legislative Assembly election, 2014 ===
Telangana Assembly Elections, 2014: Suryapet (Assembly constituency)
Party	Candidate	Votes	%	±%
TRS	Guntakandla Jagadish Reddy	43,554	25.22	
Independent	Sankineni Venkateswar Rao	41,335	23.93	
INC	Ramreddy Damodar Reddy	39,175	22.68	
TDP	Patel Ramesh Reddy	38,529	22.31	
Independent	Beeravolu Sri Harsha	2,797	1.62	
YSRCP	Beeravolu Somi Reddy	1,621	0.94	
Independent	Muppani Linga Reddy	1,448	0.84	
BSP	Dasari Narendar	1,202	0.70	
NOTA	None of the above	722	0.42	
Majority		2,219	1.29	
Turnout		1,72,701	79.90	
TRS gain from INC		Swing		

=== Andhra Pradesh Legislative Assembly election, 2009 ===
2009 Andhra Pradesh Legislative Assembly election: Suryapet (Assembly constituency)
Party	Candidate	Votes	%	±%
INC	Ramreddy Damodar Reddy	57,014	37.76	
TRS	Poreddy Chandrasekhar Reddy	50,817	33.65	
PRP	Bandaru Dhanunjaya Goud	24,696	16.35	

== See also ==
- List of constituencies of Telangana Legislative Assembly
