= Chief Minister of Telangana =

Leader of the executive branch of Government of Telangana

- Telaṅgāṇa Mukhya Mantrī
- Emblem of Telangana

- Flag of India

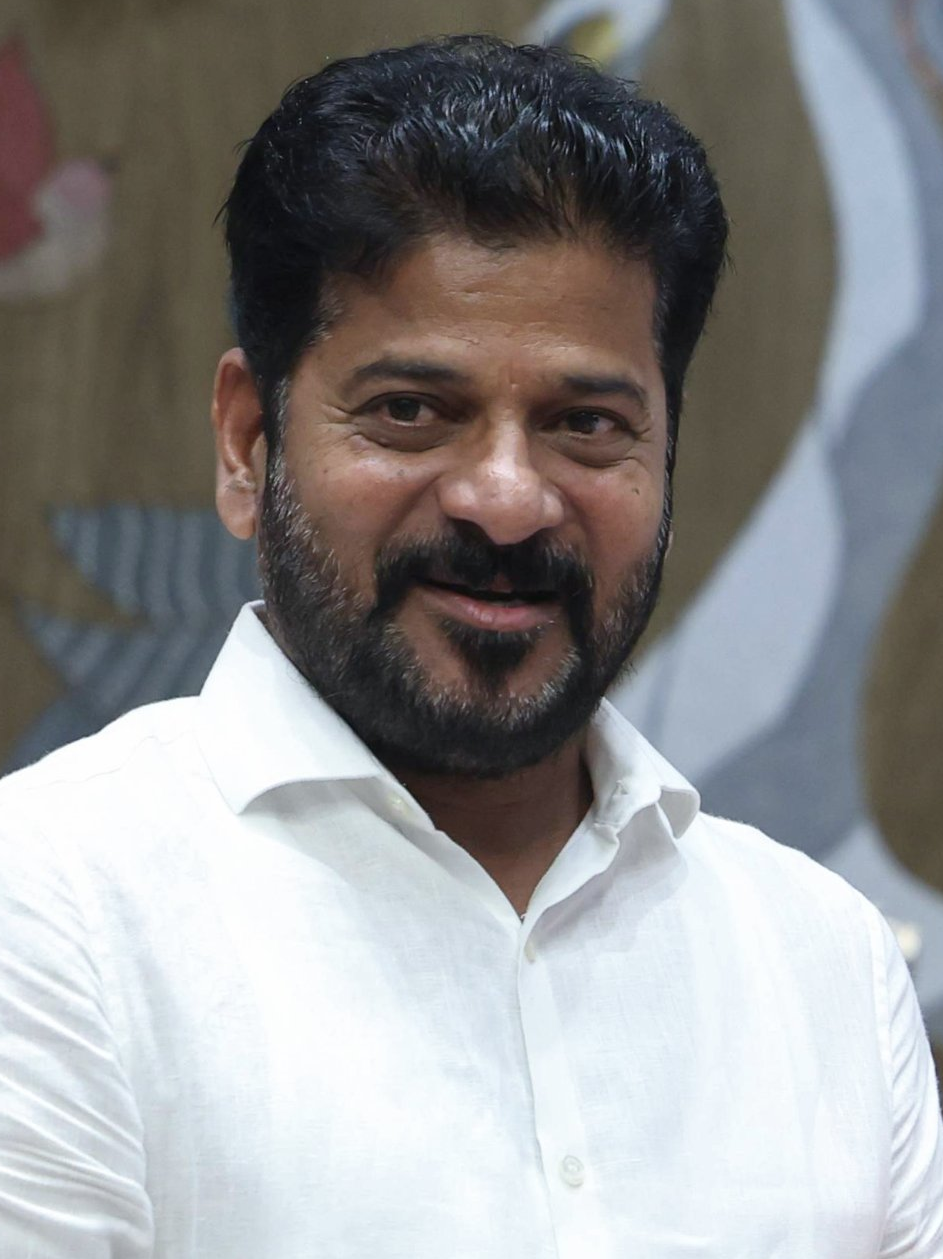
- Incumbent; Anumula Revanth Reddy since 7 December 2023
- Chief Minister's Office; Government of Telangana
- Style: The Honourable
- Type: Leader of the Executive
- Status: Head of government
- Abbreviation: CMoTelangana
- Member of: State Legislature; State Cabinet
- Reports to: Governor of Telangana; Telangana Legislature
- Residence: Praja Bhavan, Hyderabad
- Seat: Dr. B. R. Ambedkar State Secretariat, Hyderabad
- Nominator: MLAs of the majority party or alliance
- Appointer: Governor of Telangana; by convention based on appointees ability to command confidence in the Legislative Assembly
- Term length: Five years and subject to no term limit; at the confidence of the Legislative Assembly
- Precursor: Chief Minister of Andhra Pradesh
- Inaugural holder: K. Chandrashekar Rao
- Formation: 2 June 2014; 12 years ago
- Deputy: Deputy Chief Minister of Telangana
- Salary: ₹4 million (US$43,000)
- Website: Official website

The Chief Minister of Telangana is the head of government of the Indian state of Telangana. As per the Constitution of India, the governor of Telangana is the state's de jure head, but de facto executive authority rests with the chief minister, a template applicable to all other Indian states. Following elections to the Telangana Legislative Assembly, the governor usually invites the political party (or a coalition of political parties) with a majority of assembly seats to form the government in the state. The governor appoints the chief minister, whose council of ministers is collectively responsible to the assembly. Given that they have the confidence of the assembly, the chief minister's term is for five years, renewable, and is subject to no term limits. Usually, the chief minister also serves as the leader of the house in the legislative assembly.

Following the enactment of the Andhra Pradesh Reorganisation Act, 2014, the state of Telangana was officially formed on 2 June 2014. Following the 2014 assembly elections, Kalvakuntla Chandrashekar Rao of the Telangana Rashtra Samithi, was elected as the first chief minister of Telangana. He was re-elected to a second term in office after the elections in 2018. The incumbent chief minister is Revanth Reddy of the Indian National Congress since 7 December 2023.

== Chief Ministers of Telangana ==
#	Portrait	Name	Constituency	Election	Tenure in office			Party	Ministry	Appointer (Governor)
#	Portrait	Name	Constituency	Election	From	To	Time in office	Party	Ministry	Appointer (Governor)
1		K. Chandrashekar Rao (born 1954)	Gajwel	2014	2 June 2014	6 December 2023	9 years, 187 days	Bharat Rashtra Samithi	Rao I	E. S. L. Narasimhan
1		K. Chandrashekar Rao (born 1954)	Gajwel	2018	2 June 2014	6 December 2023	9 years, 187 days	Bharat Rashtra Samithi	Rao II	E. S. L. Narasimhan
2		Revanth Reddy (born 1969)	Kodangal	2023	7 December 2023	Incumbent	2 years, 348 days	Indian National Congress	Reddy	Tamilisai Soundararajan

Timeline

== Statistics ==
By term length
No.	Name	Party	Length of term
1	K. Chandrashekar Rao	Bharat Rashtra Samithi	9 years, 6 months 4 days
2	Anumula Revanth Reddy	Indian National Congress	2 years, 348 days

Parties by total duration (in days)

- BRS
- INC
