= Telangana Legislature =

State legislature of Telangana, India

Coordinates: 17.401586°N 78.467995°E

Telangana State Legislature తెలంగాణ శాసన వ్యవస్థ

Type
- Type: Bicameral
- Houses: Telangana Shasana Mandali; Telangana Shasana Sabha

History
- Founded: 2 June 2014 (11 years ago)
- Seats: 40 Seats: Telangana Shasana Mandali; 119 Seats: Telangana Shasana Sabha

Elections
- Last Shasana Mandali election: 2023
- Last Shasana Sabha election: 2023

Meeting place
- Assembly Building, Hyderabad

Website
- tlegislature.telangana.gov.in

The Telangana Legislature is the state legislature of the Indian state of Telangana. It follows a Westminster-derived parliamentary system and is composed of an

- Appointed Governor of Telangana
- The indirectly-elected Telangana Shasana Mandali
- The popularly-elected Telangana Shasana Sabha.

The Legislature works at the transit building located in the state capital Hyderabad.The legislature derives its authority from the Indian constitution, with sole authority to make laws on 61 subjects specified in the state list and shares law-making power in 52 concurrent subjects with the Parliament of India. The state uses first-past-the-post method territorial constituencies for electing members to the lower house. The members of the upper house are indirectly-elected by special constituencies or nominated by the governor. The governor is head of the state authorized to the leader of the legislature.

== State legislature ==
The Telangana Legislature is currently bicameral.

1. The lower house is called the Telangana Shasana Sabha. At present the Legislative Assembly consists of 119 Members.
2. The upper house, known as the Telangana Shasana Mandali, has lesser powers than the Assembly and several of its members are nominated by the Assembly. Others are elected from various sections of the society like Graduates and Teachers. Currently the Legislative Council consists of 43 members.

== Location ==
Sessions of the Legislative Assembly take place at the Legislative Assembly Building, located in Hyderabad. It was built in 1905 to mark the 40th birthday of 6th Nizam Mir Mahboob Ali Khan. This white gem of Hyderabad's architectural splendor was designed by specially commissioned architects. It adjoins the picturesque public gardens also known as the famous hanging gardens.

The Legislative Council meets at the historic Jubilee Hall, also in Hyderabad.
