= List of governors of Telangana =

Governor of Telangana
- Telaṅgāṇa Governoru
- Emblem of Telangana

- Flag of India

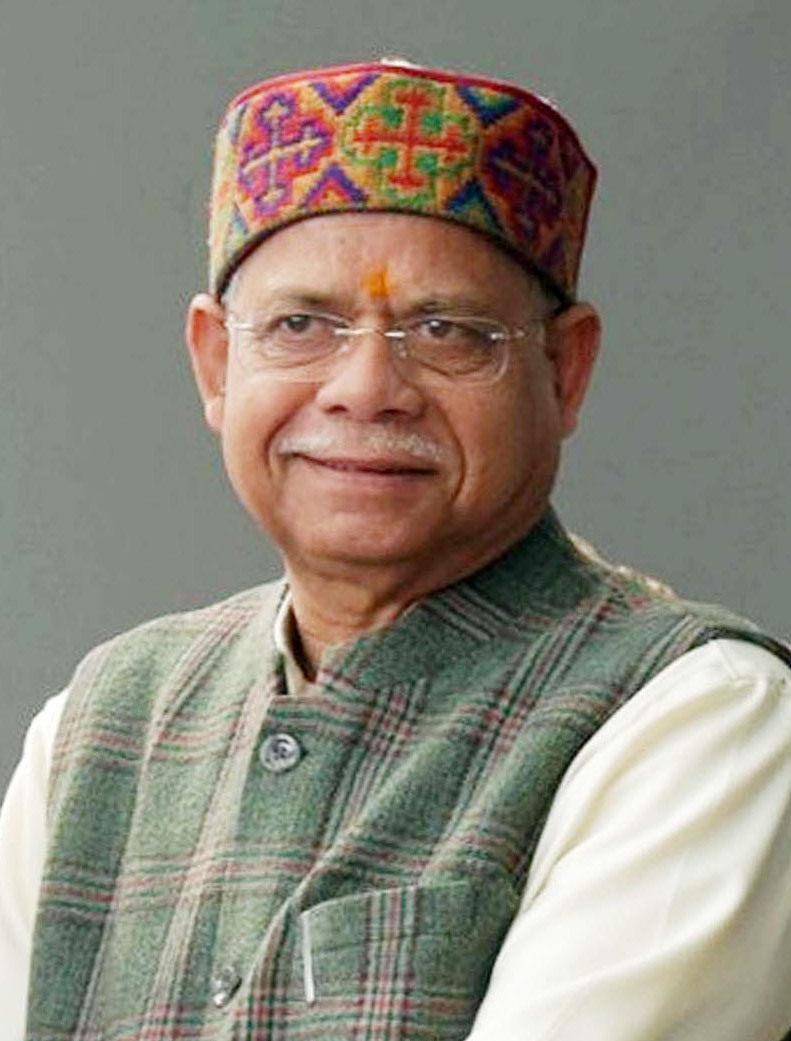
- Incumbent; Shiv Pratap Shukla since 11 March 2026
- Style: Hon’ble Governor (within India (English); His/Her Excellency (outside India)
- Status: Head of State
- Residence: Lok Bhavan, Hyderabad
- Appointer: President of India
- Term length: At the pleasure of the president
- Precursor: Governor of Andhra Pradesh
- Inaugural holder: E. S. L. Narasimhan
- Formation: 2 June 2014
- Website: governor.telangana.gov.in

Telangana is in southern India.

The governor of Telangana is the nominal head and representative of the president of India in the state of Telangana. The governor is appointed by the president for a term of five years.

Shiv Pratap Shukla has been serving as the governor since 11 March 2026.

== History ==
The post of Governor of Telangana emerged on 2 June 2014 following the bifurcation of the state from Andhra Pradesh. Then Andhra Pradesh Governor, E. S. L. Narasimhan was given the additional charge of the new state. On 20 July 2019, Narasimhan was named as the Governor of Telangana only, taking oath on 24 July 2019. Odisha leader Biswabhusan Harichandan succeeded him as Andhra Pradesh governor. On 1 September 2019, the President of India appointed Tamil Nadu leader Tamilisai Soundarajan as the Governor of Telangana. Tamilisai got additional charge as the LT Governor of Puducherry upon the retirement of Kiran Bedi. Tamilisai subsequently resigned as the Governor of Telangana and the Acting Governor of Puducherry in March 2024 upon the contesting the 2024 Indian General Election. The Governor of Jharkhand, C. P. Radhakrishnan got additional charge of both the state and the union territory. Radhakrishnan was relieved of his additional duties as the Governor of Telangana and the main duties as the Governor of Jharkhand once upon his transfer as the Governor of Maharashtra in July 2024 and was also relieved of his additional duties in Puducherry in August 2024. Former Tripura Deputy Chief Minister, Jishnu Dev Varma was appointed as the Governor of Telangana becoming the first governor not belonging from Tamil Nadu. After that, Shiv Pratap Shukla was appointed the governor of Telangana. He took oath on 11 March 2026. Since then, Shukla has been the Governor of the state.

== Powers and functions ==
The governor enjoys many different types of powers:

- Executive powers related to administration, appointments and removals,
- Legislative powers related to lawmaking and the state legislature, that is Saasana Sabha or Saasana Mandali, and
- Discretionary powers to be carried out according to the discretion of the Governor.

== List ==
Legend

- ^{†} Died in office
- ^{§} Transferred
- ^{‡} Resigned/removed

Color key

- indicates acting/additional charge

#	Portrait	Name (born – died)	Home state	Tenure in office			Appointer (President)
#	Portrait	Name (born – died)	Home state	From	To	Time in office	Appointer (President)
1		E. S. L. Narasimhan; IPS (Retd) (born 1945) (Additional charge till 23 July 2019)	Tamil Nadu	2 June 2014	7 September 2019	5 years, 97 days	Pranab Mukherjee
2		Tamilisai Soundararajan (born 1961)	Tamil Nadu	8 September 2019	19 March 2024^{[‡]} (Note: Resigned to contest in the 2024 general election)	4 years, 193 days	Ram Nath Kovind
3		C. P. Radhakrishnan (born 1957) (Additional charge)	Tamil Nadu	20 March 2024	30 July 2024^{[§]} (Note: Transferred as the Governor of Maharashtra)	132 days	Droupadi Murmu
4		Jishnu Dev Varma (born 1957)	Tripura	31 July 2024	11 March 2026^{[§]}	1 year, 223 days	Droupadi Murmu
5		Shiv Pratap Shukla (born 1952)	Uttar Pradesh	11 March 2026	Incumbent	254 days	Droupadi Murmu

== Timeline ==
Graphical

== Oath ==
Nenu... [Ikkada mee Peru cheppali], devuni perita pramanam chesthunnanu. Nenu dharmanusruthamga... [Telangana / Andhra Pradesh] rashtra dhavaniga (Governor ga) naa vidhulanu nirvahisthanani, naa shakthi vanchana lekunda raajyanganni, chattaniki liybadi prathipalisthanani, kaapadathanani, mariyu nenu... [Telangana / Andhra Pradesh] prajala seva koraku, vaari kshemam koraku nannu nenu samarpinchukuntanani devuni sakshiga pramanam chesthunnanu."

== See also ==
- Telangana
- List of chief ministers of Telangana
- Governors of India
