= Narayankhed Assembly constituency =

Constituency of the Telangana legislative assembly in India

Coordinates: 18.04°N 77.78°E

Narayankhed
- Constituency No. 35 for the Telangana Legislative Assembly
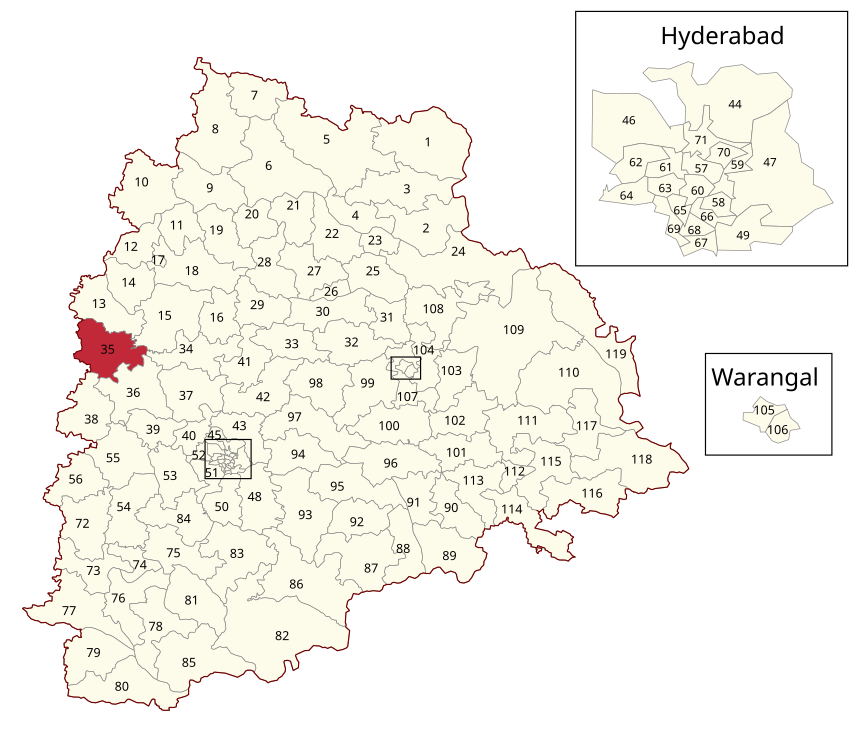
- Location of Narayankhed Assembly constituency within Telangana

Constituency details
- Country: India
- Region: South India
- State: Telangana
- District: Sangareddy
- Lok Sabha constituency: Zahirabad
- Established: 1951
- Total electors: 1,98,234
- Reservation: None

Member of Legislative Assembly
- 3rd Telangana Legislative Assembly
- Incumbent Patlolla Sanjeeva Reddy
- Party: Indian National Congress
- Elected year: 2023

Narayankhed Assembly constituency is one of 119 constituencies of Telangana Legislative Assembly, India and it is one of five constituencies in Sangareddy district. It is part of Zahirabad Lok Sabha constituency.

== Mandals ==
The Assembly Constituency presently comprises the following Mandals:

Mandal	District
Narayankhed	Sangareddy
Kangti	Sangareddy
Manoor	Sangareddy
Shankarampet -A	Medak
Kalher	Sangareddy
Nagalgidda	Sangareddy
Nizampet	Sangareddy
Sirgapur	Sangareddy

== Members of Legislative Assembly ==
Year	Member	Political party
United Andhra Pradesh
1972	Venkat Reddy	Independent politician
1978	Shivarao Shetkar	Indian National Congress
1983	M. Venkat Reddy	Telugu Desam Party
1985	Shivarao Shetkar	Indian National Congress
1989	Patlolla Kishta Reddy	Indian National Congress
1994	M. Vijaypal Reddy	Telugu Desam Party
1999	Patlolla Kishta Reddy	Indian National Congress
2004	Suresh Shetkar	Indian National Congress
2009	Patlolla Kishta Reddy	Indian National Congress
Telangana
2014	Patlolla Kishta Reddy	Indian National Congress
2016^	Mahareddy Bhupal Reddy	Telangana Rashtra Samithi
2018	Mahareddy Bhupal Reddy	Telangana Rashtra Samithi
2023	Patlolla Sanjeeva Reddy	Indian National Congress

== Election results ==
=== Telangana Legislative Assembly election, 2023 ===
Telangana Assembly Elections, 2023: Narayankhed (Assembly constituency)
Party	Candidate	Votes	%	±%
INC	Patlolla Sanjeeva Reddy	91,373	47.09	
BRS	Mahareddy Bhupal Reddy	84,826	43.72	
BJP	Jenawade Sangappa	7,823	4.03	
BSP	Mohd Alauddin	1,561	0.80	
Independent	Ponnamala Rukmini Reddy	1,137	0.59	
Independent	Satish. V	960	0.49	
Independent	Mudiraju Venkatesham	951	0.49	
NOTA	None of the Above	861	0.44	
Majority		6,547	3.37	
Turnout		1,94,036		
INC hold		Swing		

=== Telangana Legislative Assembly election, 2018 ===
2018 Telangana Legislative Assembly election: Narayankhed
Party	Candidate	Votes	%	±%
TRS	Mahareddy Bhupal Reddy	95,550	55.00	
INC	Suresh Shetkar	37,042	21.32	
BJP	Patlolla Sanjeeva Reddy	33,060	19.03	
NOTA	None of the Above	1,553	0.89	
Majority		58,508		
Turnout		1,73,733	84.31	
TRS hold		Swing		

=== Telangana Legislative Assembly by election, 2016 ===
The by election was necessitated following the death of Congress Member P. Kishta Reddy who won the seat in 2014. Bhupal Reddy won it with the biggest majority in the history of Naraynkhed constituency.

By elections, 2016: Narayankhed
Party	Candidate	Votes	%	±%
TRS	Mahareddy Bhupal Reddy	93,076	60.10%	
INC	Patlolla Sanjeeva Reddy	39,451	25.47%	
TDP	Mahareddy Vijaypal Reddy	14,787	9.54%	
Majority		53,625		
Turnout		1,54,912	82.30	
TRS gain from INC		Swing		

=== Telangana Legislative Assembly election, 2014 ===
Telangana Assembly Elections, 2014: Narayankhed (Assembly constituency)
Party	Candidate	Votes	%	±%
INC	Patlolla Kishta Reddy	62,347	31.9%	
TRS	Mahareddy Bhupal Reddy	47,601	30.15%	
TDP	Mahareddy Vijaypal Reddy	40,405	25.8%	
Majority		14,600		
Turnout		1,58,292	77.7%	
INC hold		Swing		

== See also ==
- List of constituencies of Telangana Legislative Assembly
