= List of revenue divisions in Telangana =

Revenue Divisions are the administrative divisions in districts of some of the Indian states. These divisions are sub-divided into mandals. There are 74 revenue divisions in Telangana. Revenue Divisional Officer (RDO) or Sub Collector is the head of the division.

తెలంగాణా -Telangana

== List of revenue divisions ==
There are a total of 74 revenue divisions in the state.

The below table details the revenue divisions with respect to their districts.

District	No. of Divisions	Revenue Divisions	Revenue Divisions Map	Ref
Adilabad	2	Adilabad, Utnoor		
Bhadradri Kothagudem	2	Kothagudem, Bhadrachalam		
Hanmakonda	2	Hanmakonda Parkal		
Hyderabad	2	Hyderabad, Secunderabad		
Jagtial	3	Jagtial, Korutla, Metpally		
Jangaon	2	Jangaon, Station Ghanpur		
Jayashankar Bhupalpalle	1	Bhupalpalle		
Jogulamba Gadwal	1	Gadwal		
Kamareddy	3	Kamareddy, Banswada, Yellareddy		
Karimnagar	2	Karimnagar, Huzurabad		
Komaram Bheem	2	Asifabad, Kagaznagar		
Khammam	2	Khammam, Kallur		
Mahabubnagar	1	Mahabubnagar		
Mahabubabad	2	Mahabubabad, Thorrur		
Medchal	2	Keesara, Malkajgiri		
Mulugu	1	Mulugu		
Medak	3	Medak, Narsapur, Toopran		
Mancherial	2	Mancherial, Bellampally		
Narayanapet	1	Narayanpet		
Nalgonda	4	Nalgonda, Miryalaguda, Devarakonda, Chandur		
Nagarkurnool	4	Nagarkurnool, Achampet, Kalwakurthy, Kollapur		
Nizamabad	3	Bodhan, Nizamabad, Armoor		
Nirmal	2	Nirmal, Bhainsa		
Peddapalli	2	Peddapally, Manthani		
Rajanna Sircilla	2	Sircilla, Vemulawada		
Ranga Reddy	5	Chevella, Ibrahimpatnam, Rajendranagar, Shadnagar, Kandukur		
Siddipet	3	Siddipet, Gajwel, Husnabad		
Sangareddy	4	Sangareddy, Narayankhed, Zaheerabad, Andole		
Suryapet	2	Suryapet, Kodad, Huzurnagar		
Vikarabad	2	Vikarabad, Tandur		
Wanaparthy	1	Wanaparthy		
Warangal	2	Warangal, Narsampet		
Yadadri Bhuvanagiri	2	Bhongir, Choutuppal		
Total	74			

== See also ==
- List of districts in Telangana
