= Patlolla Kishta Reddy =

Indian politician

Chairman of the Public Accounts Committee of Telangana
- In office 24 March 2015 – 25 August 2015
- Preceded by: Position established
- Succeeded by: J. Geeta Reddy

Member of the Andhra Pradesh Legislative Assembly
- In office 1989–1994
- Preceded by: Shivarao Shetkar
- Succeeded by: M. Vijaypal Reddy

Member of the Andhra Pradesh Legislative Assembly
- In office 1999–2004
- Preceded by: M. Vijaypal Reddy
- Succeeded by: Shetkar Suresh Kumar

Member of the Andhra Pradesh Legislative Assembly
- In office 2009–2014
- Preceded by: Shetkar Suresh Kumar
- Succeeded by: Constituency shifted to Telangana

Member of the Telangana Legislative Assembly
- In office 2014 – 25 August 2015
- Preceded by: Constituency shifted from Andhra Pradesh to Telangana
- Succeeded by: Mahareddy Bhupal Reddy

Personal details
- Born: 2 October 1942
- Died: 25 August 2015 (aged 72)
- Party: Indian National Congress

Patlolla Kishta Reddy (also spelled as Patlolla Kista Reddy) was an Indian politician who served as Member of the Telangana Legislative Assembly from 2014 to 2016. He also Chairman of the Public Accounts Committee of Telangana.

== Early life and education ==
He was born on 2 October 1942 to parents P. Gund Reddy and Sangamma. He graduated in BA and LLB from Osmania University, Hyderabad.

== Personal life ==
He married to P. Kamala.

== Legislative work ==
After the winning the seat in the 2014, Kista Reddy was nominated as the Legislative Assembly's Chairman of the Public Accounts Committee of Telangana, in March 2015, a key financial oversight role.

== Death and legacy ==
Patlolla Kista Reddy died on 25 August 2015. Due to the Heart Attack. He was accorded a state funeral attended by thousands, including then Deputy Chief minister Mahmood Ali, Chief Minister K. Chandrasekhar Rao and other senior leaders. His death necessitated a by-election for Narayankhed seat, in which the Congress party fielded his son, P. Sanjeev Reddy.

== Electoral performance ==
Electoral history of Patlolla Kista Reddy
Year	Election	Constituency	Party	Votes	Vote %	Result	Ref
1989	Andhra Pradesh Legislative Assembly	Narayankhed	Indian National Congress	55,506	51.3%	Won	
1994	Andhra Pradesh Legislative Assembly	Narayankhed	Independent	33,829	30.5%	Lost	
1999	Andhra Pradesh Legislative Assembly	Narayankhed	Indian National Congress	63,162	52.8%	Won	
2009	Andhra Pradesh Legislative Assembly	Narayankhed	Indian National Congress	68,472	47.0%	Won	
2014	Telangana Legislative Assembly	Narayankhed	Indian National Congress	62,347	39.8%	Won	

== See also ==
- Narayankhed Assembly constituency
- Patlolla Sanjeeva Reddy
- List of Telangana Legislative Assembly constituencies
