= Nallavagu Irrigation Project =

Stream in Telangana, India

Nallavagu
- Etymology: "Black stream"

Location
- Country: India
- State: Telangana
- District: Sangareddy district

Physical characteristics
- Length: 11.5 km (7.1 mi)

Nallavagu is a seasonal stream and medium-scale irrigation project of about 12 ha (30 acres) in Sangareddy district, Telangana, India. Classified as a completed project by the National Remote Sensing Centre, it is a tributary of the Manjira River and plays a significant role in regional agriculture.

== Geography ==
The Nallavagu flows through: Narayankhed, Shilpa Venture industrial area, and Medak district.

== Hydrology ==
=== Water management ===
- Recognized by Telangana Irrigation Department
- Modernized with ₹255 crore funding (2017)
- Frequent monsoon overflows

=== Restoration ===
- 2024 Shilpa Venture project
- Parallel works in Medak

== Ecological role ==
- Critical for drought-prone areas
- Supports local agriculture
