= Yellareddy Assembly constituency =

Constituency of the Telangana legislative assembly in India

Coordinates: 18.19°N 78.02°E

Yellareddy
- Constituency No. 15 for the Telangana Legislative Assembly
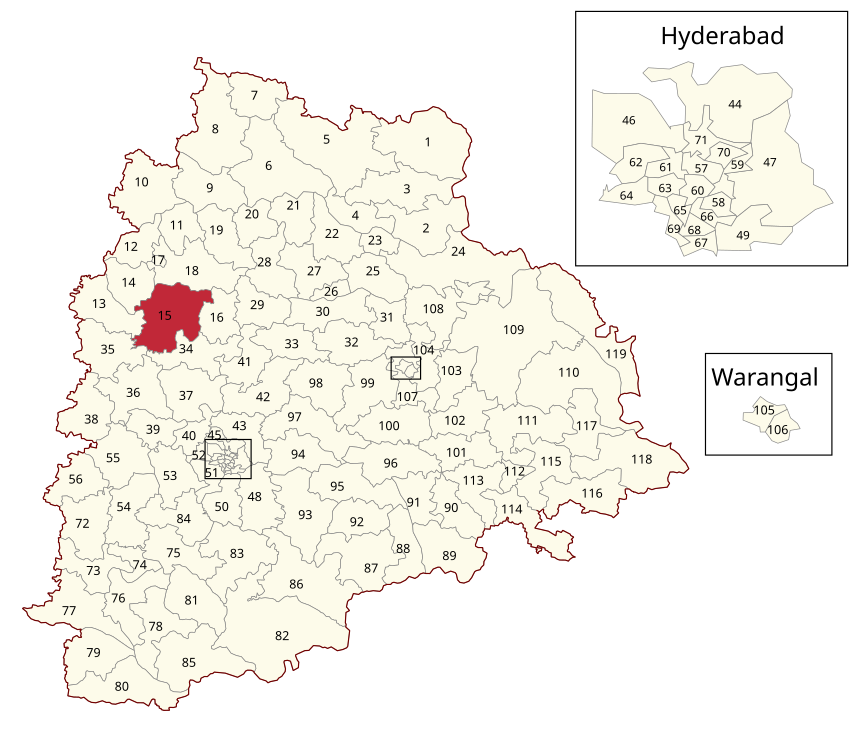
- Location of Yellareddy Assembly constituency within Telangana

Constituency details
- Country: India
- Region: South India
- State: Telangana
- District: Kamareddy
- Lok Sabha constituency: Zahirabad
- Established: 1962
- Total electors: 2,20,000
- Reservation: None

Member of Legislative Assembly
- 3rd Telangana Legislative Assembly
- Incumbent K. Madan Mohan Rao
- Party: Indian National Congress
- Elected year: November 30, 2023

Yellareddy Assembly constituency is a constituency of Telangana Legislative Assembly, India. It is one of nine constituencies in Nizamabad district. It is part of Zahirabad Lok Sabha constituency.

K. Madan Mohan Rao of Indian National Congress represents the constituency.

== Mandals ==
The Assembly Constituency presently comprises the following Mandals:

Mandal
Yellareddy
Lingampet
Tadwai
Sadasivanagar
Nagareddipet
Gandhari
Ramareddy
Rajampet

== Members of Legislative Assembly ==
Duration	Member	Political party
1962	T. N. Sadalakshmi	Indian National Congress
1967	J Eshwari Bai	Republican Party of India
1972	J Eshwari Bai	Independent politician
1978	Tadur Bala Goud	Indian National Congress
1983	Kisan Reddy	Telugu Desam Party
1985	Yerva Srinivas Reddy	Telugu Desam Party
1989	Anjaneyulu Nerella	Telugu Desam Party
1994	Anjaneyulu Nerella	Telugu Desam Party
1999	Anjaneyulu Nerella	Telugu Desam Party
2004	Eanugu Ravinder Reddy	Telangana Rashtra Samithi
2008	Bogudameedhi Janardhan Goud	Indian National Congress
2009	Eanugu Ravinder Reddy	Telangana Rashtra Samithi
2010	Eanugu Ravinder Reddy	Telangana Rashtra Samithi
2014	Eanugu Ravinder Reddy	Telangana Rashtra Samithi
2018	Jajala Surender	Indian National Congress
2023	K. Madan Mohan Rao	Indian National Congress

== Election results ==
=== 2023 ===
2023 Telangana Legislative Assembly election: Yellareddy
Party	Candidate	Votes	%	±%
INC	K. Madan Mohan Rao	86,989	47.07	
BRS	Jajala Surender	62,988	34.08	
BJP	Vadepally Subhash Reddy	27,000	14.61	
BSP	Jamuna Rathla	1,973	1.07	
NOTA	None of the Above	1,300	0.7	
Majority		24,001		
Turnout		1,84,800	83.7	
INC hold		Swing		

=== 2018 ===
2018 Telangana Legislative Assembly election: Yellareddy
Party	Candidate	Votes	%	±%
INC	Jajala Surender	91,510	54.31%	
TRS	Eanugu Ravinder Reddy	56,362	33.45%	
Independent	Talari Balaraju	9,684	5.75%	
BJP	Banala Laxman Reddy	6,357	3.77%	
NOTA	None of the Above	2,218	1.32%	
Majority		35,148		
Turnout		1,68,481	86.32%	

== See also ==
- List of constituencies of Telangana Legislative Assembly
