= Zahirabad Lok Sabha constituency =

Lok sabha constituency in Telangana

Coordinates: 17.7°N 77.6°E

Zahirabad TG-5
- Lok Sabha constituency
- Zahirabad Lok Sabha Constituency in Telangana

Constituency details
- Country: India
- Region: South India
- State: Telangana
- Assembly constituencies: Jukkal; Banswada; Yellareddy; Kamareddy; Narayankhed; Andole; Zahirabad
- Established: 2008
- Total electors: 1,445,246
- Reservation: None

Member of Parliament
- 18th Lok Sabha
- Incumbent Suresh Kumar Shetkar
- Party: INC
- Elected year: 2024

Zahirabad Lok Sabha constituency is one of the 17 Lok Sabha (Lower House of the Parliament) constituencies in Telangana state in southern India.

Suresh Kumar Shetkar of Indian National Congress is currently representing the constituency for second time.

== History ==
The constituency came into existence in 2008, following the implementation of delimitation of parliamentary constituencies based on the recommendations of the Delimitation Commission of India constituted in 2002. It comprises three constituencies from Medak district and four assembly constituencies from Kamareddy district.

== Assembly segments ==
Zahirabad Lok Sabha constituency comprises the following Legislative Assembly segments:

No	Name	District	Member	Party	Leading (in 2024)
13	Jukkal (SC)	Kamareddy	Thota Laxmi Kantha Rao	INC	INC
14	Banswada	Kamareddy	Pocharam Srinivas Reddy	BRS	INC
15	Yellareddy	Kamareddy	K. Madan Mohan Rao	INC	BJP
16	Kamareddy	Kamareddy	K. V. Ramana Reddy	BJP	BJP
35	Narayankhed	Sangareddy	Patlolla Sanjeeva Reddy	INC	INC
36	Andole (SC)	Sangareddy	Damodar Raja Narasimha	INC	INC
38	Zahirabad (SC)	Sangareddy	K. Manik Rao	BRS	INC

== Members of Parliament ==
Year	Member	Party
1952-2008 : Constituency did not exist
Andhra Pradesh
2009	Suresh Shetkar	Indian National Congress
Telangana
2014	B. B. Patil	Telangana Rashtra Samithi
2019	B. B. Patil	Telangana Rashtra Samithi
2024	Suresh Shetkar	Indian National Congress

== Election results ==
=== 2024 ===
2024 Indian general election in Telangana: Zahirabad
Party	Candidate	Votes	%	±%
INC	Suresh Kumar Shetkar	528,418	42.73	▲1.75
BJP	B. B. Patil	482,230	39.00	▲25.70
BRS	Gali Anil Kumar	172,078	13.92	▼27.66
NOTA	None of the above	2,977	0.24	▼0.83
Majority		46,188	3.72	
Turnout		1,236,593	74.63	▲4.93
INC gain from BRS		Swing		

Detailed Results at: https://results.eci.gov.in/PcResultGenJune2024/ConstituencywiseS295.htm

=== General election, 2019 ===
2019 Indian general election: Zahirabad
Party	Candidate	Votes	%	±%
TRS	B. B. Patil	434,244	41.58	−4.88
INC	Madan Mohan Rao	4,28,015	40.98	+7.73
BJP	Banala Laxma Reddy	1,38,947	13.30	
NOTA	None of the above	11,640	1.07	
Majority		6,229	0.60	
Turnout		10,44,504	69.70	
TRS hold		Swing		

=== General election, 2014 ===
2014 Indian general elections: Zahirabad
Party	Candidate	Votes	%	±%
TRS	B. B. Patil	5,08,661	46.46	+9.27
INC	Suresh Kumar Shetkar	3,64,030	33.25	−5.65
TDP	K.Madan Mohan Rao	1,57,497	14.39	N/A
RPI(A)	Marri Durgesh	18,027	1.64	
YSRCP	Mahmood Mohiuddin	12,383	1.13	
BSP	Syed Ferozuddin	8,180	0.74	
NOTA	None of the above	11,157	1.02	
Majority		1,44,631	13.21	+11.50
Turnout		10,94,806	77.28	+2.61
TRS gain from INC		Swing	+6.45	

=== General election, 2009 ===
2009 Indian general elections: Zahirabad
Party	Candidate	Votes	%	±%
INC	Suresh Kumar Shetkar	3,95,767	38.90	
TRS	Syed Yousuf Ali	3,78,360	37.19	
PRP	Malkapuram Shivakumar	1,12,792	11.09	
Majority		17,407	1.71	
Turnout		10,17,290	74.67	
INC win (new seat)				

== See also ==
- List of constituencies of the Lok Sabha
- Medak district
