= Tadkal =

Coordinates: 18°14′N 77°42′E

Tadkal Village
- Village
- Interactive map of Tadkal Village
- Country: India
- State: Telangana
- District: Sangareddy district
- Taluka (Revenue Division): Narayankhed

Government
  - Body: Tadkal Gram panchayat

Population (2001)
  - Total: 6,286

Languages
  - Official: Telugu, Kannda, Urdu
- Time zone: UTC+5:30 ([Indian Standard Time|IST])
- ISO 3166 code: IN-TS
- Vehicle registration: TS
- Website: Www.telangana.gov.in

Tadkal is a small town in the Kangti mandal of the Sangareddy district of the south Indian state of Telangana.

== Demographics ==
As of 2001 India census, Tadkal had a population of 6286 with 3138 males and 3148 females.
