= Mahareddy Bhupal Reddy =

Indian politician

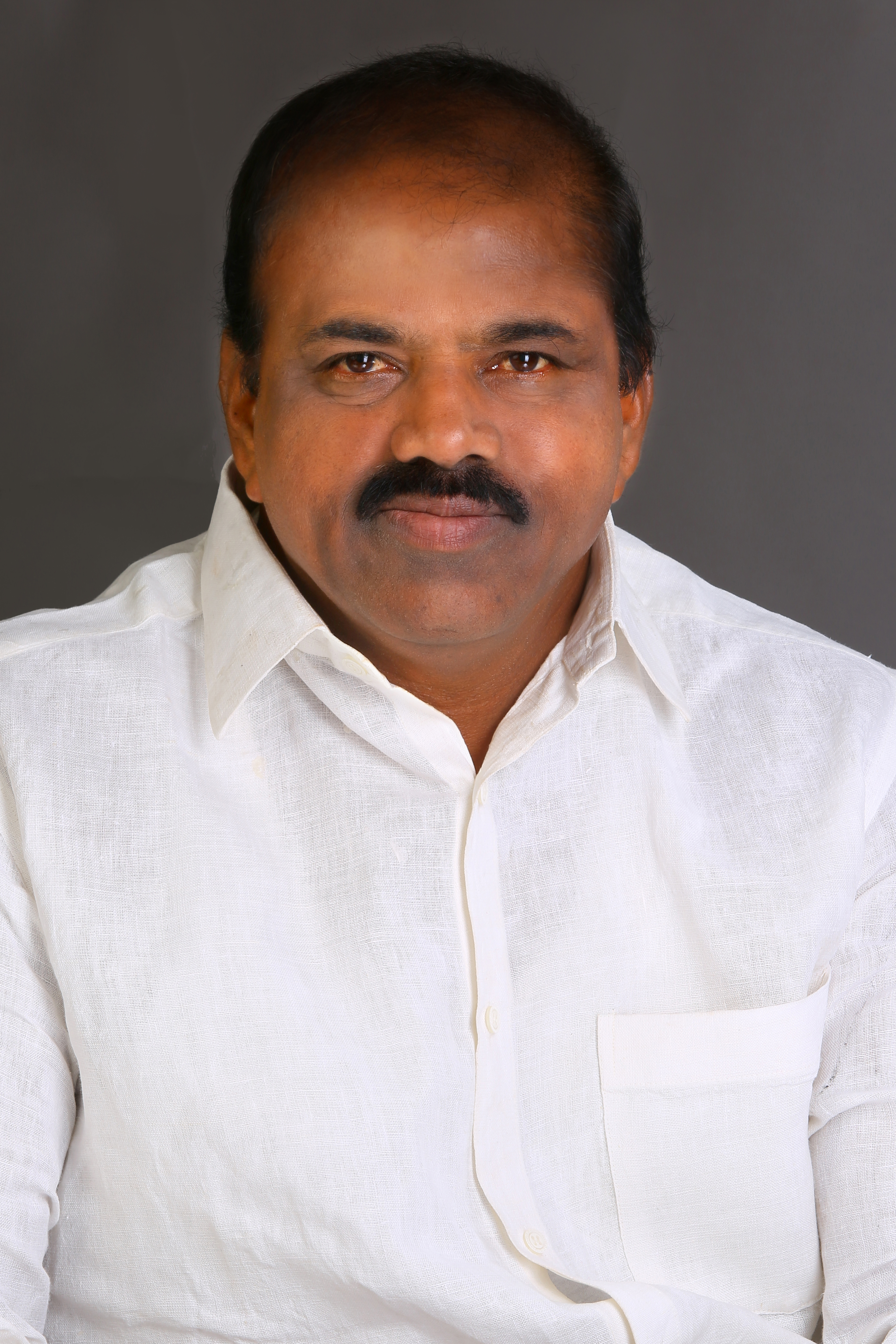

Member of the Telangana Legislative Assembly
- In office 21 February 2016 – 03 December 2023
- Preceded by: Patlolla Kishta Reddy, INC
- Succeeded by: Patlolla Sanjeeva Reddy
- Constituency: Narayankhed

Personal details
- Born: 7 May 1960 (age 66) Khanapoor B, Kalher mandal, Medak district, Andhra Pradesh (present–day Sangareddy district, Telangana), India
- Party: Telangana Rashtra Samithi
- Spouse: M. Jayasree Reddy
- Children: Mahareddy Roshan Reddy (son); Mahareddy Shreya Reddy (daughter)
- Parents: Mahareddy Venkat Reddy (father); Shankuntala Reddy (mother)
- Education: Bachelor of Science
- Alma mater: Osmania University
- Website: mahareddybhupalreddy.com
- Positions Held: 24 February–3 December 2023; Member Committee on Govt. Assurances, Telangana Legislative Assembly

Mahareddy Bhupal Reddy (born May 7, 1960), often referred to by his initials M.B.R., is an Indian politician who served as the Member of the Telangana Legislative Assembly (MLA) from Narayankhed constituency from 21 February 2016 to 3 December 2023.

== Early life ==
Bhupal Reddy was born in Khanpur village, Kalher mandal, Sangareddy district to Shakuntalamma and Mahareddy Venkat Reddy. He obtained a BSc degree from Osmania University, Hyderabad in 1981. His father Mahareddy Venkat Reddy has also served as a member of legislature for two terms.

== Personal life ==
Bhupal Reddy married Jayashree Reddy in 1988. They have two kids. His son's name is Roshan and daughter is Sreya. Bhupal Reddy's brother Mahareddy Vijaypal Reddy is also a politician and has also served as an MLA for Narayankhed constituency once.

== Career ==
Reddy started his career as a director of DCCB bank at his home place Krishnapur, Sangareddy.

=== Political career ===
Bhupal Reddy started his political career with the Telugu Desam Party, in Medak district. He later joined TRS, in 2001, and has played a key role in the Telangana state formation movement.

Bhupal Reddy joined the TRS party in 2008 and contested his first election as an MLA from the Narayankhed constituency in 2009. Then he continued to serve in the state farming department for 9 years. As the sitting MLA Patlolla Kista Reddy died due to heart attack. A by-election was called in February 2016 for the Narayankhed constituency, Reddy has contested this election from the TRS party and has won with a thumping majority.

The TRS party main leader Harish Rao has played key role during 2014 elections in all Telangana especially in United Medak district and other districts in Northern Telangana. He also took the complete responsibility of Narayankhed by election, this played a key role in establishing TRS majority in a congress led Constituency.

Reddy has won again in the 2018 Telangana Legislative Assembly election with 37042 votes majority against Congress party contestant Suresh Shetkar. Currently, he is serving as an MLA to the Narayankhed constituency.
