= Zahirabad Assembly constituency =

Constituency of the Telangana legislative assembly in India

Coordinates: 17.68°N 77.61°E

Zahirabad
- Constituency No. 38 for the Telangana Legislative Assembly
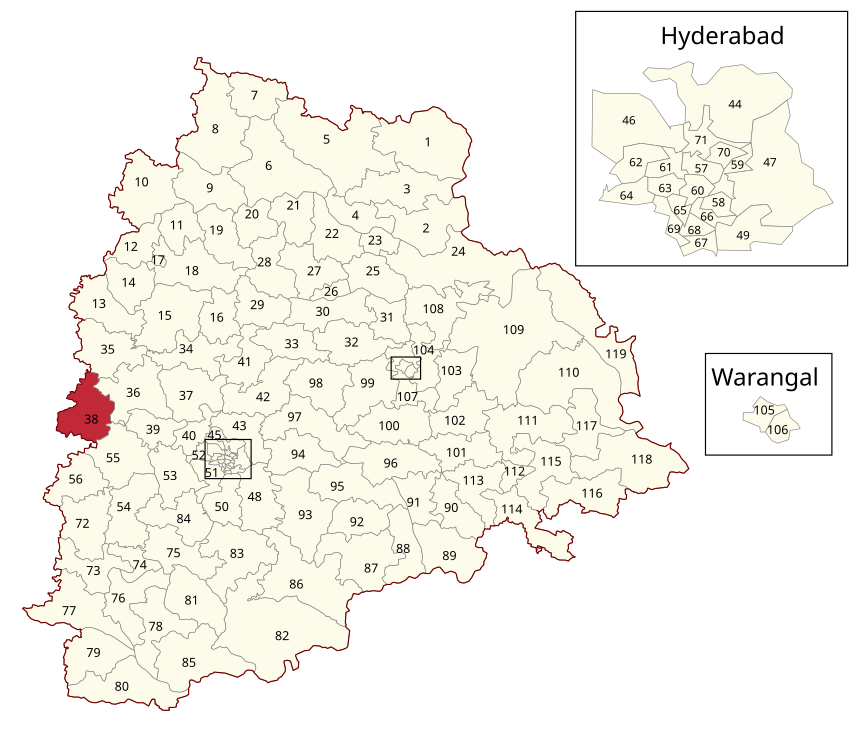
- Location of Zahirabad Assembly constituency within Telangana

Constituency details
- Country: India
- Region: South India
- State: Telangana
- District: Sangareddy
- Lok Sabha constituency: Zahirabad
- Established: 1951
- Total electors: 2,26,878
- Reservation: SC

Member of Legislative Assembly
- 3rd Telangana Legislative Assembly
- Incumbent Koninty Manik Rao
- Party: BRS
- Elected year: 2018

Zahirabad Assembly constituency is a SC reserved constituency of Telangana Legislative Assembly, India. It is one of five constituencies in Sangareddy district. It is part of Zahirabad Lok Sabha constituency.

Koninty Manik Rao, a retired RTO, is representing Bharat Rashtra Samithi for the first time defeating a long time sitting MLA and top brass Congress Leader J. Geeta Reddy.

== Mandals ==
The Assembly Constituency presently comprises the following Mandals:

Mandal
Zahirabad
Kohir
Nyalkal
Jharasangam
Mogudampally

== Members of the Legislative Assembly ==
The constituency became reserved for candidates from the Scheduled Castes for the 2009 election and thereafter. The successful candidates have been:

== Members of Legislative Assembly ==
Year	Member	Political party
Hyderabad State
1952	Gunde Rao	Indian National Congress
United Andhra Pradesh
1957	M. Baga Reddy	Indian National Congress
1962	M. Baga Reddy	Indian National Congress
1967	M. Baga Reddy	Indian National Congress
1972	M. Baga Reddy	Indian National Congress
1978	M. Baga Reddy	Indian National Congress
1983	M. Baga Reddy	Indian National Congress
1985	M. Baga Reddy	Indian National Congress
1989	Patlolla Narsimha Reddy	Indian National Congress
1994	C. Baganna	Telugu Desam Party
1999	Mohammed Fareeduddin	Indian National Congress
2004	Mohammed Fareeduddin	Indian National Congress
2009	J. Geeta Reddy	Indian National Congress
Telangana
2014	J. Geeta Reddy	Indian National Congress
2018	Koninty Manik Rao	Telangana Rashtra Samithi
2023	Koninty Manik Rao	Bharat Rashtra Samithi

== Election results ==
=== 2023 ===
2023 Telangana Legislative Assembly election: Zahirabad
Party	Candidate	Votes	%	±%
BRS	Koninty Manik Rao	97,205	46.49	
INC	Agam Chandra Sekhar	84,415	40.37	
BJP	Ramchandra Raja Narasimha	13,645	6.53	
NOTA	None of the Above	613	0.29	
Majority		12,790		
Turnout		2,09,108	77.19	
BRS hold		Swing		

=== 2018 ===
2018 Telangana Legislative Assembly election: Zahirabad
Party	Candidate	Votes	%	±%
TRS	Koninty Manik Rao	96,598	51.14	
INC	J. Geeta Reddy	62,125	32.89	
BJP	Jangam Gopi	19,454	10.30	
NOTA	None of the Above	1,884	1.00	
Majority		34,473		
Turnout		1,88,899	81.35	
TRS gain from INC		Swing		

=== 2014 ===
2014 Andhra Pradesh Legislative Assembly election: Zahirabad
Party	Candidate	Votes	%	±%
INC	J. Geeta Reddy	57,558	34.68	
TRS	Koninty Manik Rao	56,716	34.17	
TDP	Yerpula Narotham	39,057	23.53	
Majority		842		
Turnout		1,65,982	73.16	
INC hold		Swing		

== See also ==
- List of constituencies of the Telangana Legislative Assembly
