= Koninty Manik Rao =

Indian politician

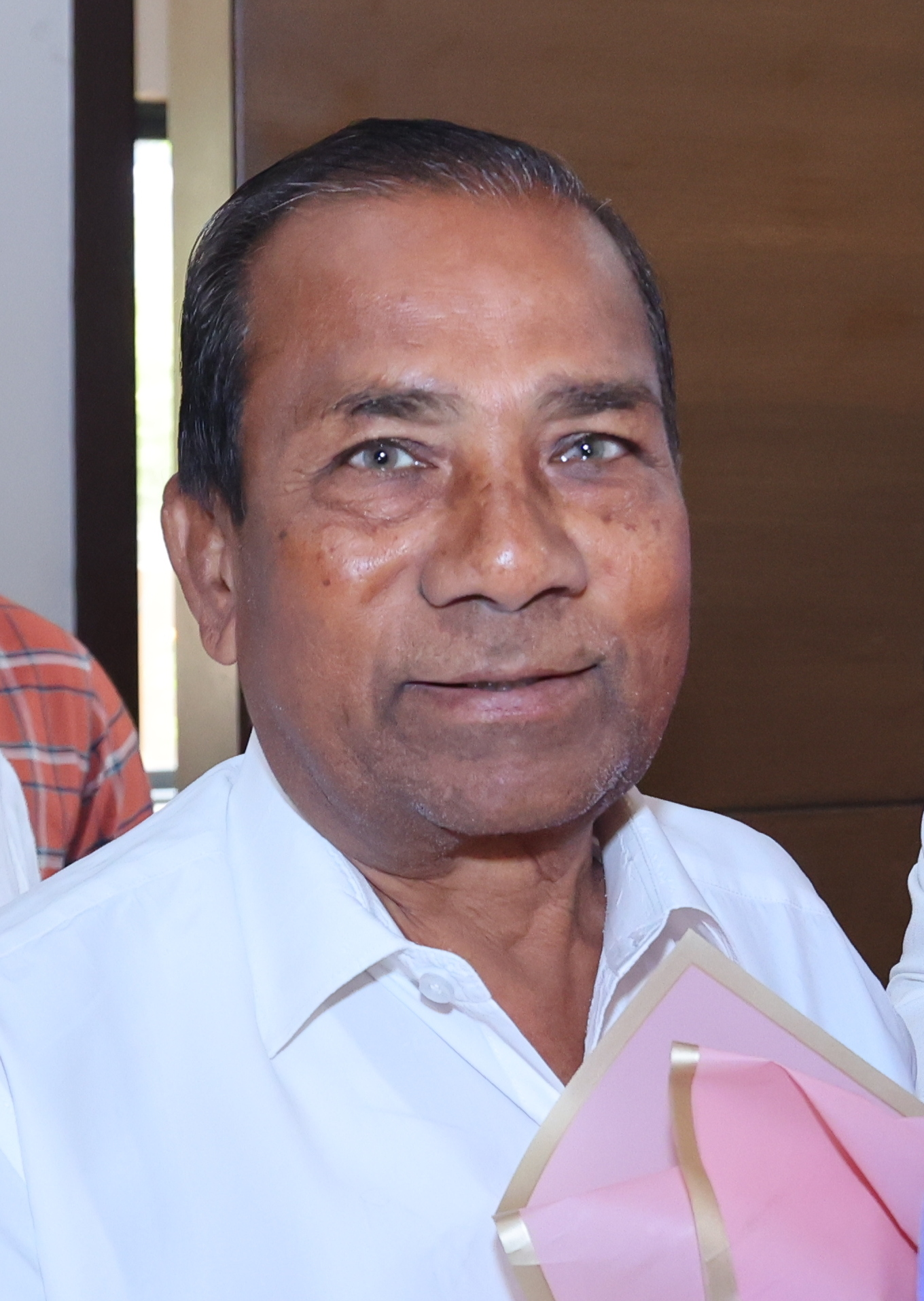

Member of the Telangana Legislative Assembly
- Incumbent
- Assumed office 11 December 2018
- Preceded by: J. Geeta Reddy
- Constituency: Zahirabad

Personal details
- Born: 9 July 1953 (age 72) Jharasangam
- Party: Bharat Rashtra Samithi (2014–present)
- Education: Diploma in Mechanical Engineering; Diploma in Automobile Engineering
- Occupation: Politician; R.T.O. Officer (Retired)

Koninty Manik Rao (born 9 July 1955) is an Indian politician from Telangana state. He is an MLA from Zahirabad Assembly constituency which is reserved for SC community in Sangareddy district. He represents Bharat Rashtra Samithi and won the 2023 Telangana Legislative Assembly election.

== Early life and education ==
Rao is from Zahirabad, which is Medak district (presently in Sangareddy district). His late father, Koninty Balappa, was a farmer. He was a government employee and retired as Road Transport Officer. He did his Diploma in Automobile and Mechanical engineering in 1978 at Government Polytechnic, Masab Tank, Hyderabad.

== Career ==
Rao started his career with Bharat Rashtra Samithi. He contested the 2014 Andhra Pradesh Legislative Assembly election and polled 56,716 votes but lost to his nearest rival and former minister J. Geeta Reddy of Indian National Congress by a narrow margin of 842 votes. However, he won the Zahirabad Assembly constituency in the 2018 Telangana Legislative Assembly election on BRS ticket where he polled votes and defeated his nearest rival and same candidate he lost earlier, J Geeta Reddy of Indian National Congress, by a huge margin of 34,473 votes. In 2018, He retained the seat in the 2023 Telangana Legislative Assembly election from Zahirabad Assembly seat representing BRS. He polled 97,205 votes, and defeated his nearest rival A. Chandrasekhar Rao of Indian National Congress by a margin of 12,790 votes.
