= Naganpally =

- Village
- Country: India
- State: Telangana

Area
  - Total: 12.49 km^{2} (4.82 sq mi)

Population (2024)
  - Total: 1,866
  - Density: 143/km^{2} (370/sq mi)

Languages
  - Official: Kannada, Telugu
- Time zone: UTC+5:30 (IST)
- Area code: 502286
- Vehicle registration: TG 15

Naganpalli is a village in Naganpalli of Narayankhed taluka, Sangareddy district, Telangana State, India.
