= Mohammed Fareeduddin =

Indian politician (1957–2021)

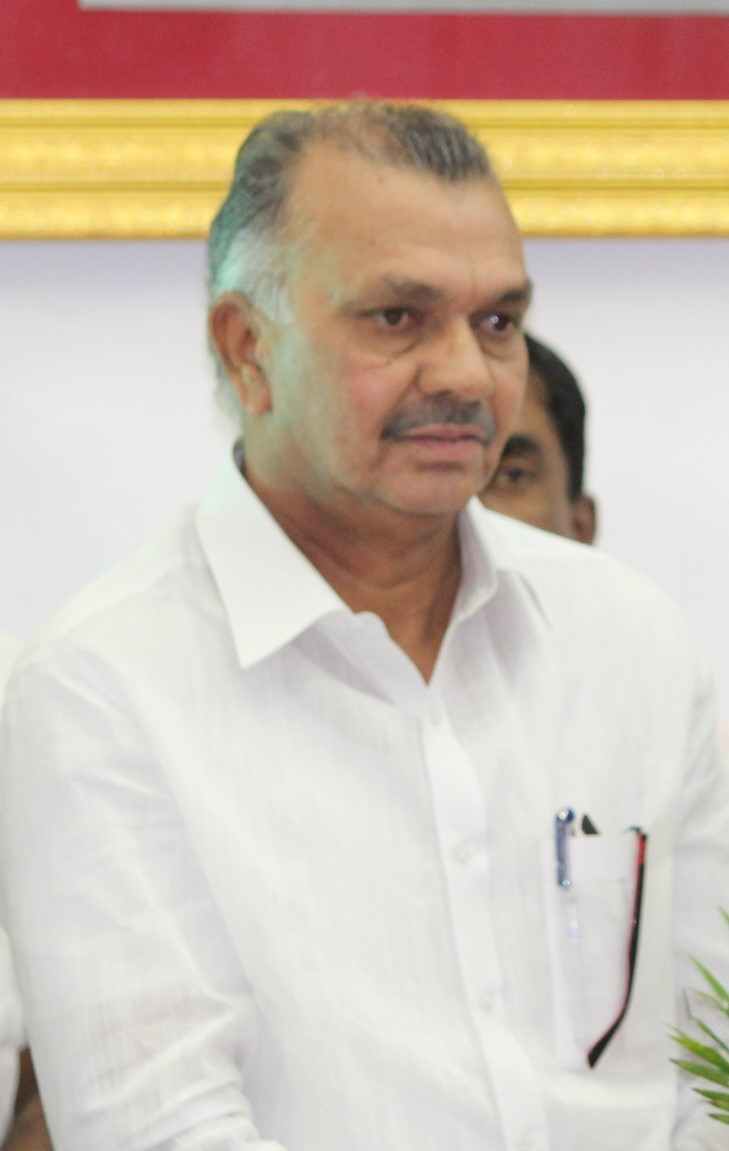

Minister of Minority Welfare, Wakf, Sugar, Urdu Academy, and Hajj of Andhra Pradesh
- In office 2004 – February 2007
- Constituency: Zahirabad Assembly constituency

Minister of Co-operation and Fisheries & Public Enterprises of Andhra Pradesh
- In office April 2007 – 2 September 2009
- Succeeded by: Kasu Krishna Reddy
- Constituency: Zahirabad Assembly constituency

Member of the Andhra Pradesh Legislative Assembly
- In office 1999–2009
- Constituency: Zahirabad Assembly constituency

Chairman of the Committee on Welfare of Minorities of Telangana
- In office 2019 – 29 December 2021

Member of the Telangana Legislative Council
- In office 03 October 2016 – 03 June 2021

Personal details
- Born: 14 October 1957 Hothi B village, Zaheerabad, Telangana, India
- Died: 29 December 2021 (aged 64) Hyderabad, Telangana, India
- Party: Telangana Rashtra Samithi (from August 2014 to 29 December 2021)
- Other political affiliations: Indian National Congress (until August 2014)
- Children: 3 including (Mohammed Mubeen)
- Profession: Politician

Mohammed Fareeduddin (14 October 1957 – 29 December 2021) was an Indian politician who served as a Member of the Telangana Legislative Council. He was elected unopposed as a Telangana Rashtra Samithi (TRS) candidate in 2016.

== Political career ==
Fareeduddin was a Member of the Legislative Assembly (MLA) for Andhra Pradesh for ten years to 2009. He began his political career as a sarpanch of chota Hyderabad and Hothi B in Zahirabad mandal, representing the Zahirabad constituency as an Indian National Congress (INC) politician. In the 2009 elections, the constituency, which had elected INC members in all but one of the elections since 1957, became reserved for candidates from the Scheduled Castes and his party preferred to put J. Geeta Reddy forward as their candidate. Therefore, Fareeduddin instead contested the Amberpet constituency, where he lost to G. Kishan Reddy of the Bharatiya Janata Party. He joined the TRS in August 2014.

In 2016, as a TRS politician, Fareeduddin was elected as a Member of the Legislative Council of Telangana, a state that had been created in 2014 by the bifurcation of Andhra Pradesh. The position had become vacant following the election of Thummala Nageswara Rao as an MLA. The election under the terms of the MLA's quota was unopposed.

=== Posts held ===
Fareeduddin became a minister in May 2004, when he was appointed in the government of Y. S. R. Reddy. He was Minister for Minority Welfare and Fisheries in 2004 and still in that office around February 2007. He became Minister for Co-operation in April 2007.

== Personal life and death ==
Fareeduddin was born on 14 October 1957 in Hothi B village, Zaheerabad, Telangana, India.

He died from cardiac arrest at a private hospital in Hyderabad, on 29 December 2021, at the age of 67.
