= Nyalkal =

- Village
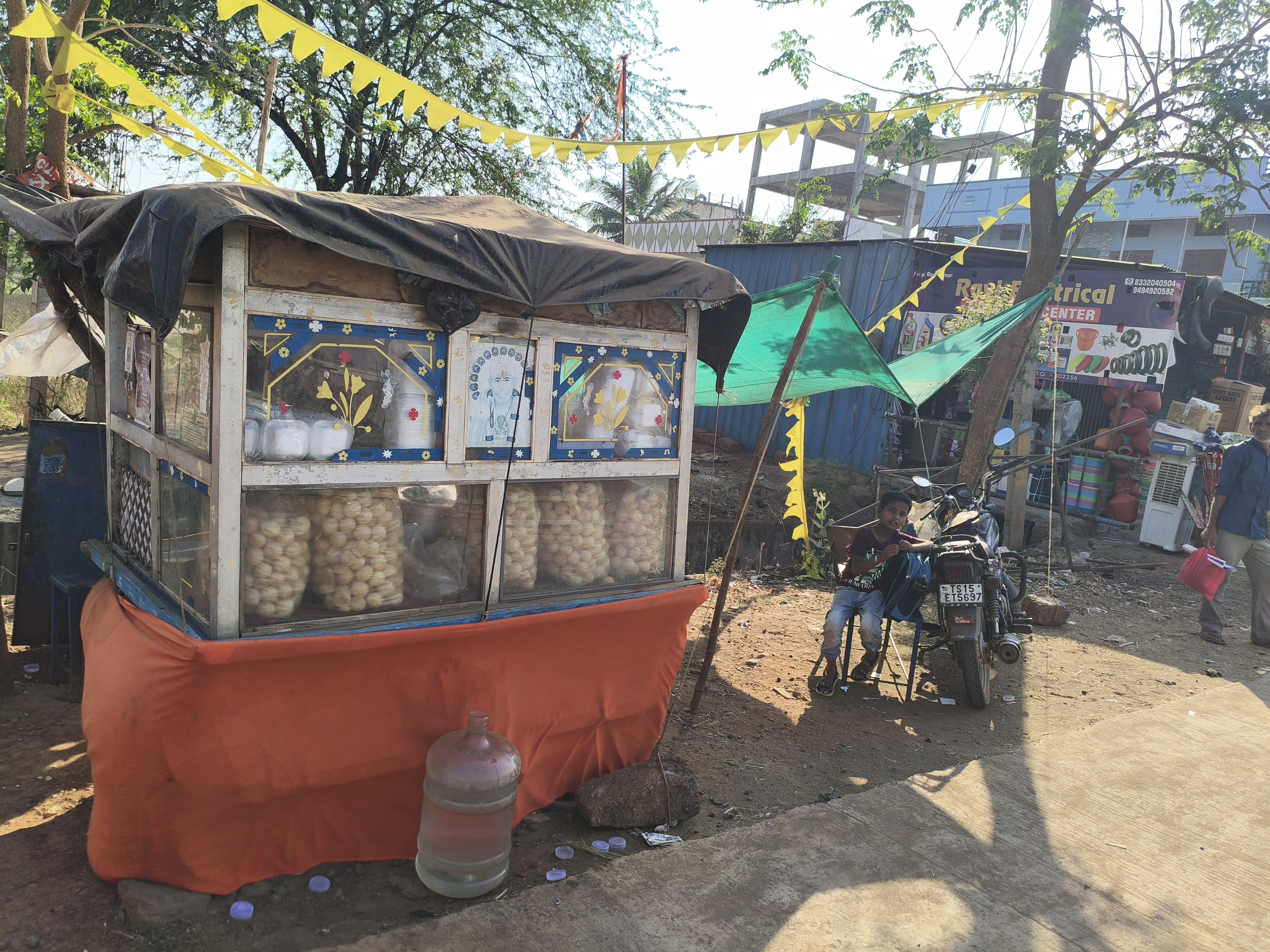

- Location in Telangana, India Nyalkal (India)
- Coordinates: 17.8500°N 77.6667°E
- Country: India
- State: Telangana
- District: Sangareddy
- Elevation: 585 m (1,919 ft)

Population (2001)
  - Total: 3,513

Languages
  - Official: Telugu
- Time zone: UTC+5:30 (IST)
- PIN: 502256
- Vehicle registration: TS-23
- Vidhan Sabha constituency: Zahirabad
- Website: telangana.gov.in

Nyalkal is a village in Sangareddy district of Telangana, India.

It is bounded by Manoor, Raikode, Jharasangam and Zahirabad mandals in Sangareddy district and Bidar district of Karnataka state.

== Geography ==
Nayalkal is located at 17.8500°N 77.6667°E. It has an average elevation of 585 metres (1922 ft).

== Demographics ==
According to Indian census, 2001, the demographic details of Nyalkal mandal is as follows:

- Total Population: 53,721 in 9,055 Households.
- Male Population: 27,098 and Female Population: 26,623
- Children Under 6-years of age: 8,849 (Boys - 4,475 and Girls - 4,374)
- Total Literates: 20,913

Nyalkal village has a population of 3,513 in 2001.

Sri Bala Tripura Sundari Devi at Bhavani Mata Temple, Nyalkal
