= List of districts in Telangana by GDP =

== GDP of districts of Telangana ==
Gross District Domestic Product of Telangana at current prices from 2018–19 to 2020–21 (in INR Crore).

Details of 2018–19 are those of Third Revised Estimates (TRE), 2019–20 are of Second Revised Estimates (SRE), 2020–21 are of First Revised Estimates (FRE).

S.No.	District	GDP 2018-19	GDP 2019-20	GDP 2020-21
1	Adilabad	11,540	13,364	12,689
2	Kumuram Bheem	8,856	8,764	7,935
3	Mancherial	13,868	15,759	15,484
4	Nirmal	10,827	13,038	12,575
5	Nizamabad	23,530	28,396	28,479
6	Jagitial	12,893	17,055	16,835
7	Peddapalli	17,051	18,010	16,327
8	Kamareddy	13,764	16,920	16,928
9	Rajanna Siricilla	7,961	9,641	9,844
10	Karimnagar	18,866	19,862	21,362
11	Jayashankar	12,732	12,138	10,861
12	Sangareddy	41,285	46,438	45,626
13	Medak	15,845	19,519	19,184
14	Siddipet	20,436	20,488	25,332
15	Jangaon	8,277	10,952	10,651
16	Hanamkonda	15,641	17,661	16,587
17	Warangal	10,440	12,892	14,276
18	Mulugu	4,827	5,766	5,626
19	Kothagudem	21,175	24,532	22,955
20	Khammam	26,122	30,900	31,911
21	Mahabubad	11,960	12,252	13,367
22	Suryapet	17,189	21,971	22,523
23	Nalgonda	29,891	37,269	38,927
24	Bhuvanagiri	15,004	17,828	18,651
25	Medhcal-Malkajgiri	61,768	67,559	62,506
26	Hyderabad	1,61,759	1,66,039	1,62,564
27	Ranga Reddy	1,71,136	1,83,299	1,98,997
28	Vikarabad	15,919	15,014	14,344
29	Narayanpet	5,924	8,834	9,225
30	Mahabubnagar	20,866	21,453	22,787
31	Nagarkurnool	12,081	16,252	15,897
32	Wanaparthy	8,345	10,311	10,128
33	Jogulamba	9,634	10,094	10,402
GDDP		8,57,427	9,50,286	9,61,800

List of erstwhile districts of Telangana, India by GDP in 2012–2013.

- The tabulated figures provided below are outdated yet the only official information provided by the Government of India. This data was collected before the bifurcation of the state of Andhra Pradesh into the new state of Telangana with 10 districts.
- The 10 districts below were further carved out in October 2018 to form 33 new districts of Telangana.
- US Dollars (USD) adjusted with 2012 dollar to Indian National Rupee (INR) rates of 52.68 INR.

Rank	District	GDP (in INR Crore)	GDP (in Billion USD)	Year
1	Hyderabad	62,894	11.93	2012-2013
2	Rangareddy	61,199	11.61	2012-2013
3	Medak	40,075	7.60	2012-2013
4	Karimnagar	32,165	6.10	2012-2013
5	Nalgonda	28,174	5.34	2012-2013
6	Mahbubnagar	25,814	4.90	2012-2013
7	Khammam	24,402	4.63	2012-2013
8	Warangal	23,247	4.41	2012-2013
9	Adilabad	19,641	3.72	2012-2013
10	Nizamabad	17,407	3.30	2012-2013

== See also ==
- Economy of Telangana
- List of districts of Telangana
- List of cities in Telangana by population
- List of Indian cities by GDP per capita
