= Kangti =

- Village
- Bharat Petrol Pump Kangti
- Interactive map of Kangti
- Location in Telangana, India Kangti (India)
- Coordinates: 18.2167°N 77.6333°E
- Country: India
- State: Telangana
- District: Sangareddy district

Government
  - Type: Grama Panchayat
  - Body: Gram Panchayat of Kangti

Area
  - Total: 10 km^{2} (3.9 sq mi)
- Elevation: 493 m (1,617 ft)

Population (2011)
  - Total: 4,207
  - Density: 420/km^{2} (1,100/sq mi)
- Demonym: Kangtikar

Languages
  - Official: Telugu
- Time zone: UTC+5:30 (IST)
- PIN CODE: 502286
- Vehicle registration: TS-23
- Assembly constituency: Narayankhed
- Lok Sabha constituency: Zahirabad
- Website: telangana.gov.in

Kangti is a town and Mandal headquarters of Kangti Mandal in the Sangareddy district in the Indian state of Telangana.

== Geography ==
Kangti is located at 18°13'23.13"N, 77°36'56.98"E. It has an average elevation of 493 metres (1620 ft).

== Demographics ==
According to the 2001 Indian census, the demographic details of Kangti mandal are as follows:

- Total population: 44,769 in 7,594 households.
- Male population: 22,899 and female population: 21,870
- Children under 6-years of age: 8,168 (boys - 4,084; girls - 4,084)
- Total literates: 13,683

The Kangti village had a population of 3,614 in 2001.

== School ==
School Name	Location
Gnyan Vikas School	Kangti

== College ==
College Name	Location
Govt. Jr. College	Kangti
