= Anigunta =

Anegunta
- Village
- Country: India
- Subdistrict: Zahirabad
- District: Medak
- State: Telangana

Population (2011)
  - Total: 2,502
- Postal code: 502220

Anegunta, also spelled Anigunta, is a village in Zahirabad Mandal of Medak district in Telangana, India.

== Demographics ==
The population of the village is 2502 people (1300 male, 1200 female) as of 2011. The literacy rate was 65 percent, more than India's national average. A large portion of the population is composed of tribes who settled in tandas.
