= T. N. Sadalakshmi =

Indian politician

Deputy Speaker of the Andhra Pradesh Legislative Assembly
- In office 15 March 1960 – 1 March 1962

Member of the Andhra Pradesh Legislative Assembly
- In office 1957–1962
- Preceded by: Position established
- Succeeded by: Vittalreddigari Venkatarama Reddy
- Constituency: Kamareddy

Member of the Andhra Pradesh Legislative Assembly
- In office 1962–1967
- Succeeded by: Eshwari Bai
- Constituency: Yellareddy

Personal details
- Born: 25 December 1928 Hyderabad, Andhra Pradesh, India
- Died: 24 July 2004 (aged 75) Hyderabad, Andhra Pradesh, India
- Party: Indian National Congress; Telangana Congress; Telugu Desam Party
- Spouse: T. Venkata Narayana

Takella. N. Sadalakshmi (1928–2004) was the first Dalit woman legislator of Telangana.

== Early life ==
Sadalakshmi was born at Pensionpura in Hyderabad. She studied at Keyes High School and had begun a course in medicine in Madras when she heard B. R. Ambedkar deliver a speech at Jeera Compound. She decided then to abandon medicine in favour of politics.

== Political career ==
Sadalakshmi was first elected from the Peddapalli constituency and subsequently from that of Kamareddy. She rose to become deputy speaker of the Andhra Pradesh Legislative Assembly.

In 1962, Sadalakshmi was elected to the state assembly from Yellareddy assembly constituency. She became the first and only woman minister in the cabinet of Neelam Sanjiva Reddy. As a Minister of Religious and Charitable Endowments – a position she held for a year – she took the decision to train Dalits as Hindu priests. She set up an Archaka School at Yadagirigutta and allowed women into Devasthanam trusts. Later, as Social Welfare Minister, she set up SC Corporation.

Sadalakshmi supported Ambedkarism and the movement for a separate Telangana state. She joined the Telugu Desam Party in 1982 at N. T. Rama Rao's insistence and was appointed to be the party's vice-president. She later left Telugu Desam Party to work for the Telangana Congress Party.

== Personal life ==
Sadalakshmi was married to T. Venkata Narayana, a prominent Scheduled Caste leader. They had a son and two daughters. She died on 24 July 2004 at CARE Hospital due to a cardiac problem. She was cremated at Bansilalpet.
