= Jajala Surender =

Indian politician

Jajala Surender (born 25 March 1973) is an Indian politician from Telangana state. He is a former member of the Telangana Legislative Assembly from the Yallareddy Assembly constituency in the then Nizamabad district representing the Indian National Congress.

== Early life ==
Surender is from Nallamadugu village, Komareddy district, Telangana state. He is the son of Jajala Narsaiah. He completed his B.Com. in 1995 at Sardar Patel College, which is affiliated with Osmania University, Hyderabad. He declared assets worth Rs.4 crore in his affidavit to the Election Commission of India.

== Career ==
Surender won the Yallareddy Assembly constituency in the 2018 Telangana Legislative Assembly election representing the Indian National Congress. He polled 91,510 votes and defeated his nearest rival, Eanugu Ravinder Reddy of the Telangana Rashtra Samithi, by a margin of 35,148 votes. He made his electoral debut in the 2014 Andhra Pradesh Legislative Assembly election on the Congress ticket but lost to Ravinder Reddy, by a margin of 24,009 votes. Later in March 2019, he joined the Bharat Rashtra Samithi and contested the 2023 Telangana Legislative Assembly election on BRS ticket but lost to the Indian National Congress candidate, K. Madan Mohan Rao, by 24,001 votes.
