= B. B. Patil =

Indian politician

Bheemrao Basavantarao Patil
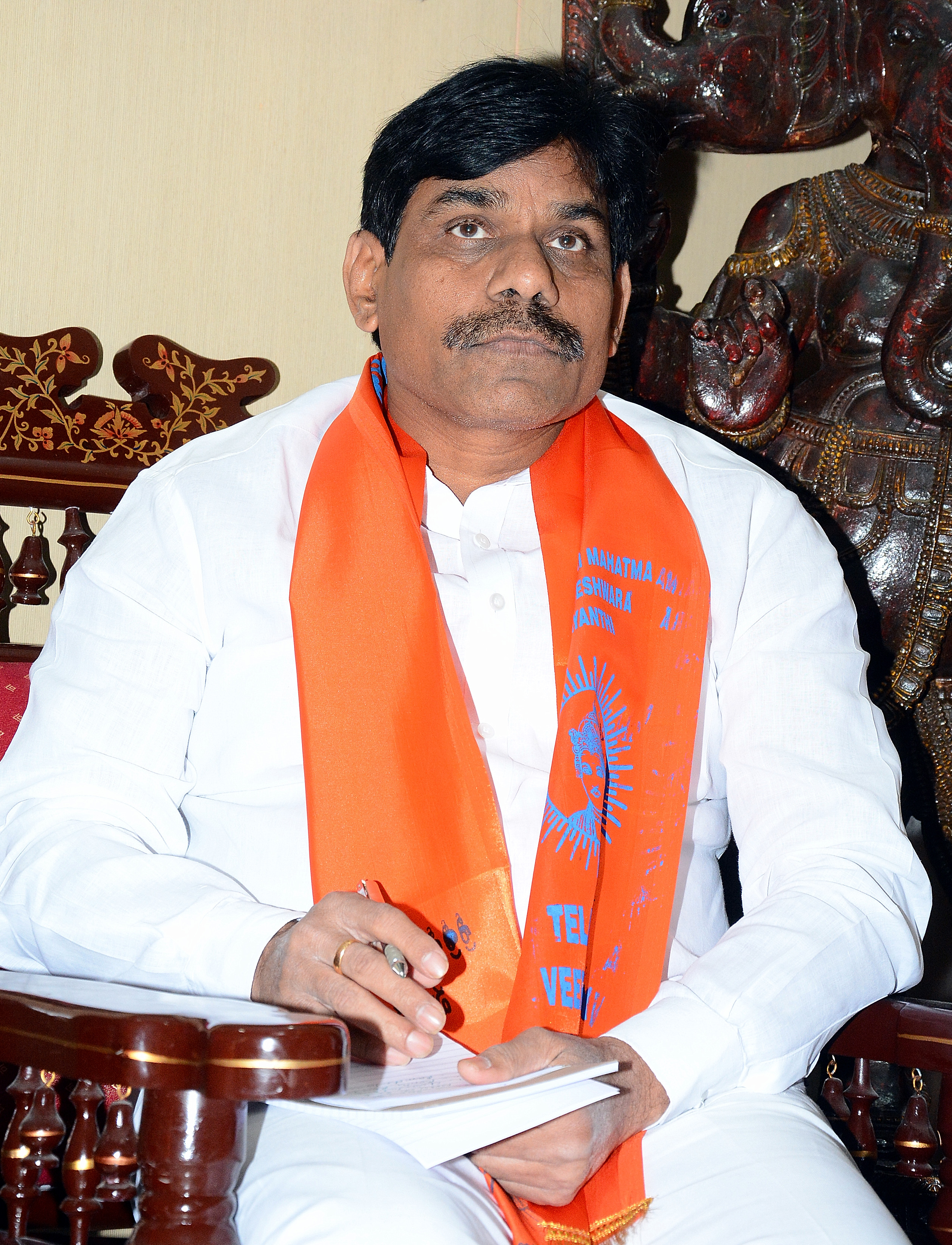
- Patil in 2016

Member of Parliament, Lok Sabha
- In office May 2014 – June 2024
- Preceded by: Suresh Shetkar
- Succeeded by: Suresh Shetkar
- Constituency: Zahirabad Lok Sabha constituency

Personal details
- Born: Bheemrao Basawanthrao Patil; 1 November 1955 (age 70) Sirpoor, Nizamabad
- Party: Bharatiya Janata Party (2024–present)
- Other political affiliations: Telangana Rashtra Samiti (2014–2024)
- Spouse: Aruna
- Children: 2
- Parent: Hanmabai (mother)
- Education: B.Sc. (Agriculture)
- Alma mater: Marathwada Agriculture College, Parbhani, Maharashtra
- Profession: Agriculturist; Businessperson
- Website: www.bbpatil.com

Bheemarao Basawanthrao Patil, popularly known as B B Patil is an Indian politician who was the Member of Parliament in the Lok Sabha for Zahirabad Lok Sabha constituency.

Patil was elected from Zaheerabad twice in 2014 and 2019 on BRS ticket. After the BRS lost the 2023 assembly elections he quit BRS ahead of 2024 Lok Sabha polls and joined BJP in the presence of Union minister Rajeev Chandrasekhar, party in-charge of Telangana affairs Tarun Chugh in New Delhi on 1 March 2024.
