= Kondapur, Sangarreddy =

Kondapur
- Location in Telangana, India Kondapur (India)
- Coordinates: 17.5614°N 78.0111°E
- Country: India
- State: Telangana
- District: Medak
- Elevation: 525 m (1,722 ft)

Languages
  - Official: Telugu
- Time zone: UTC+5:30 (IST)
- Vehicle registration: TG 15
- Website: telangana.gov.in

Kondapur is a Village and Mandal in a newly formed Sangareddy district of Telangana State, India. Kondapur belongs to Sangareddy revenue division. Kondapur was a Mandal in the former Medak district of Telangana.

There is a museum (belonging to Archaeological Survey of India department) located about 1 km south of the village, Kondapur. The museum houses exhibits from an ancient mound locally known as Kotagadda (Fort Mound) which is located nearby. The remains of a highly artistic life led by the people of the early historic period are found at this museum.

== Geography ==
Kondapur is located at 17.5614°N 78.0111°E. It has an average elevation of 525 meters (1725 feet).

Kondapur Mandal is bounded by Sangareddy Mandal towards North and Sadasivpet Mandal towards west.

== Panchayat list ==
There are 10 Villages that are listed under Kondapur Mandal:

1. Aliabad
2. Ananthasagar
3. CH. Goplaram
4. CH.Konapur
5. Dobbakunta
6. Gangaram
7. Garakurthi
8. Girmapur
9. Gollapalle
10. Gunthapalle
