= Economy of Telangana =

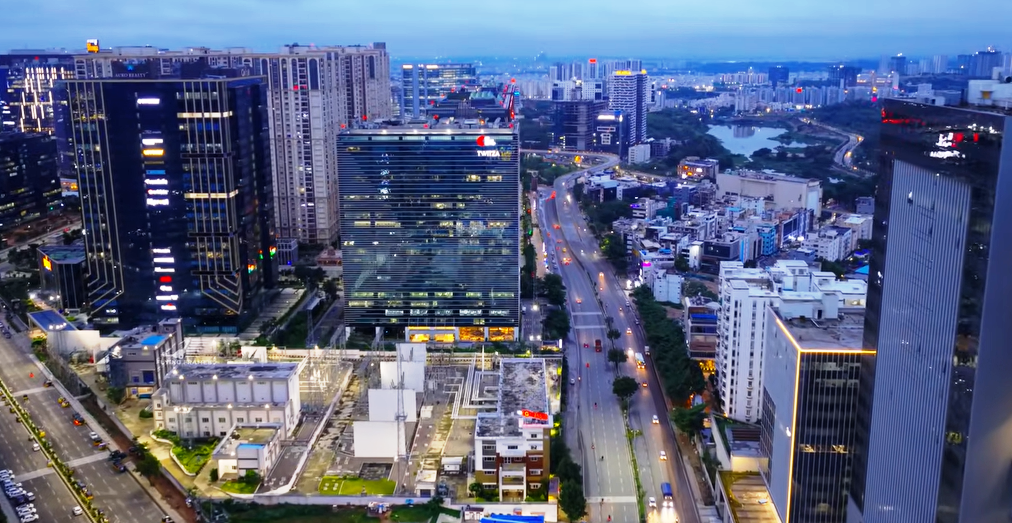
- Hyderabad, the capital of Telangana.
- Fiscal year: 1 April – 31 March

Statistics
- GDP: ₹1,961,701 crore (US$200 billion) (2026-27 est.)
- GDP rank: 9th
- GDP growth: 10% (2025-26 est.)
- GDP per capita: ▲₹420,347 (equivalent to ₹430,000 or US$4,508 in 2026) (2024-2025); ▲$22,981 (PPP; 2025-2026)
- GDP per capita rank: 5th
- GDP by sector: Agriculture (17%); Industry (16%); Services (66%) (2024-25)
- Inflation (CPI): ▼7.46% (2019-20)
- Population below national poverty line: ▼5.77%
- Labour force by occupation: Agriculture (45.8%); Industry (21.0%); Services (33.2%) (2020-21)
- Unemployment: ▼5.2% (Sep 2025)
- Average gross salary: 256465
- Average net salary: 211344

Public finance
- Government debt: 29.29% of GSDP (2024-25 est.)
- Budget balance: ₹−54,010 crore (US$−5.6 billion) 3.0% of GSDP (2025-26 est.)
- Revenue: ₹2.29.721 lakh crore (US$24 billion) (2025-26 est.)
- Spending: ₹2.84.837 lakh crore (US$29 billion) (202-26 est.)
- All values, unless otherwise stated, are in US dollars.

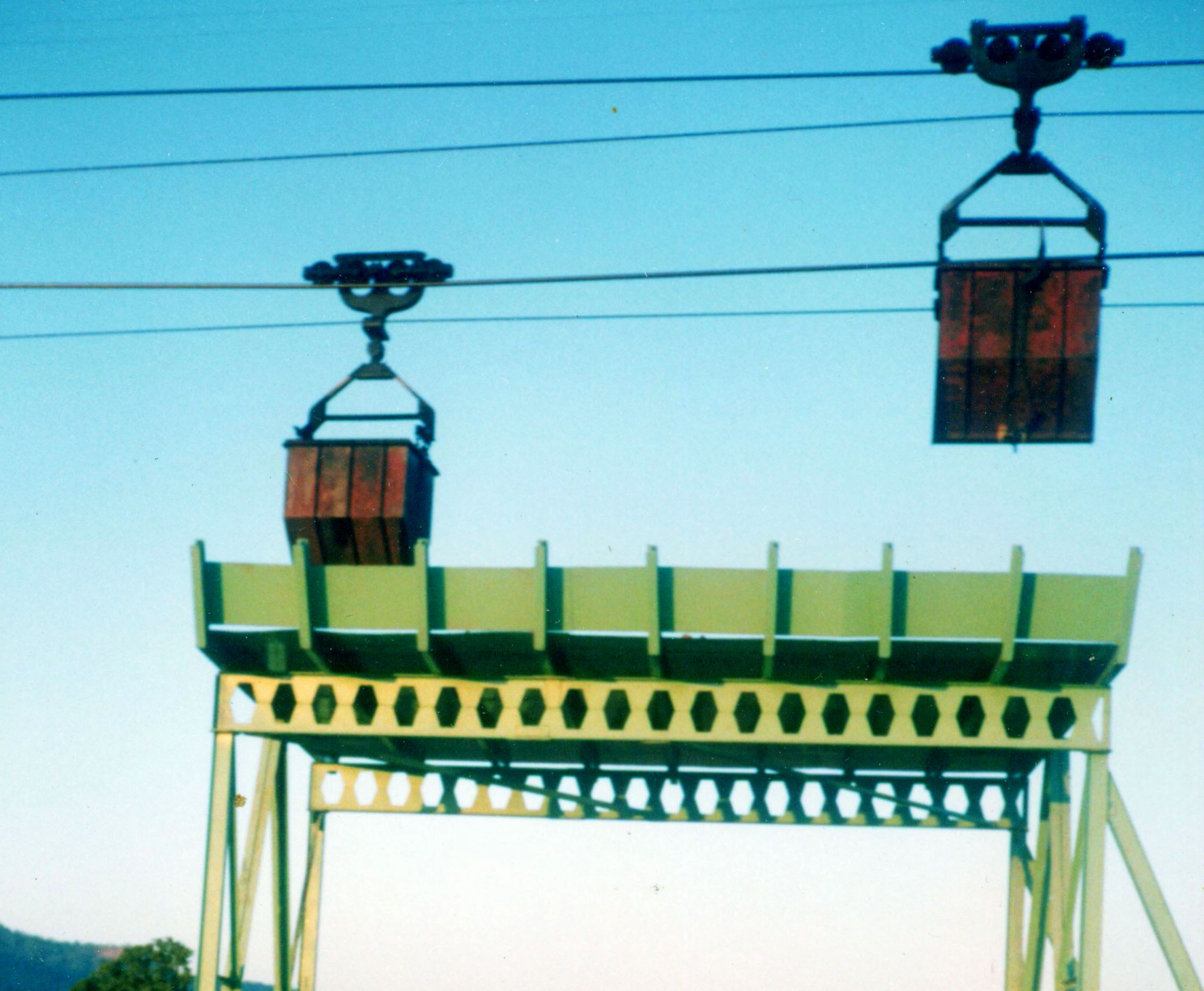
Coal Handling Ropeway at Aswapuram, Khammam district

Telangana is a state in India having an average annual growth rate of 13.90% over 2014-2019. Telangana's nominal gross state domestic product for the year 2023-24 stands at ₹15.2 lakh crore (US$180 billion). Service sector is the largest contributor to Telangana's economy with a share of about 65% in the year 2018-19. Growth in services has largely been fuelled by IT services with the State holding leading position in IT & ITeS in the country in terms of production and exports.

Around 54% of GDP comes from the Greater Hyderabad Metropolitan Region. Agriculture also form a backbone of Telangana's Economy. Two important rivers of India, the Godavari and Krishna, flow through the state, providing irrigation. Farmers in Telangana mainly depend on rain-fed water sources for irrigation. Rice is the major food crop. Other important local crops are cotton, sugar cane, mango and tobacco. Recently, crops used for vegetable oil production, such as sunflower and peanuts, have gained favour. There are many multi-state irrigation projects in development, including Godavari River Basin Irrigation Projects.

The state has also started to focus on the fields of information technology and biotechnology. There are 68 Special Economic Zones in the state.

Telangana is a mineral-rich state, with coal reserves at Singareni Coal mines.

== Agriculture and livestock ==
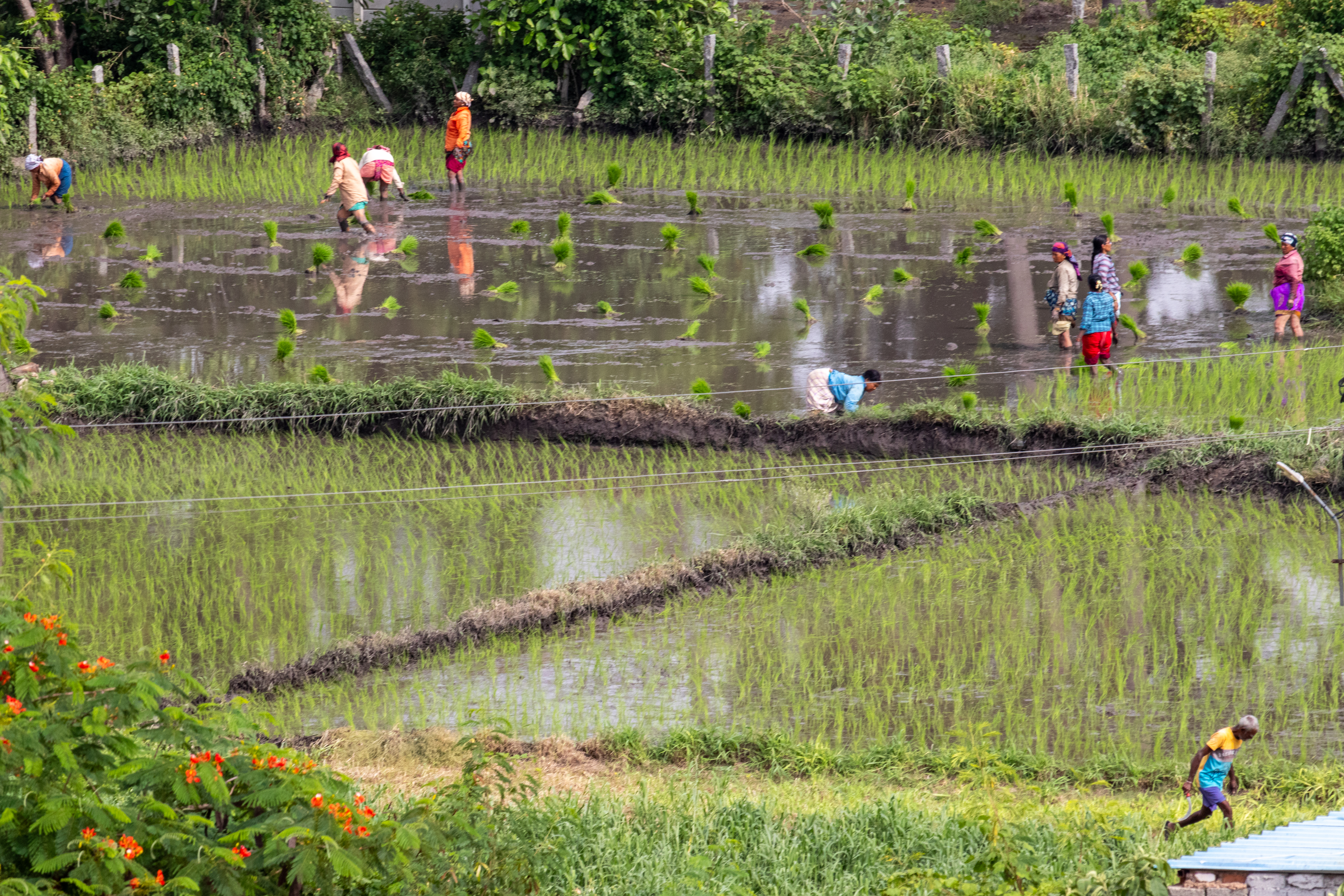
Paddy cultivation near Bhongir Fort

Rice is the major food crop and staple food of the state. Other important crops are tobacco, mango, cotton, and sugar cane. Agriculture has been the chief source of income for the state's economy. Important rivers of India, the Godavari, Krishna flow through the state, providing irrigation. Apart from major rivers, there are small rivers as Tunga Bhadra, Bima, Dindi, Kinnerasani, Manjeera, Manair, Penganga, Pranahitha, peddavagu and Taliperu. There are many multi-state irrigation projects in development, including Godavari River Basin Irrigation Projects and Nagarjuna Sagar Dam, the world's highest masonry dam.

Given below is a table of 2015 national output share of select agricultural crops and allied segments in Telangana based on 2011 prices

Segment	National Share %
Ajwain	30.5
Cow pea	27.8
Chilli	16.0
Turmeric	13.7
Egg	12.4
Kapas(Cotton)	11.2
Fibre	10.5
Lemon	10.0
Bitter gourd	9.5
Meat	9.4
Tomato	8.9
Orange	8.7
Wool & hair	7.6
Maize	7.4
Mango	6.5
Cucumber	5.4
Bean	5.3

Agri Export Zones for the following produce are proposed at the places mentioned against them:

- Gherkins – Mahaboobnagar, Rangareddy, Medak, Karimnagar, Warangal
- Mangoes and Grapes - Hyderabad, Rangareddy, Medak, Mahaboobnagar

Telangana is developing into a seed hub in India, and was selected as a certifying agency as per OECD standards, for 10 states. The state cultivated seeds in 2,251 acres and exported 17,000 quintals to countries like Sudan, Egypt, Philippines and in 2017-18, it expanded cultivation to 2,567 acre and was expecting yield of 26,000 quintals.

== Industries ==
Several major manufacturing and services industries are in operation mainly around Hyderabad. Automobiles and auto components industry, spices, mines and minerals, textiles and apparels, pharmaceutical, horticulture, poultry farming are the main industries in Telangana.

The state government is in the process of developing Industrial Parks at different places, for specific groups of industries. The existing parks are Software Park at Hyderabad, HITEC City for software units, Apparel Park at Gundlapochampalli, Export Promotion Park at Pashamylaram, Bio-technology park at Turkapally.

== Services ==
=== Information Technology ===
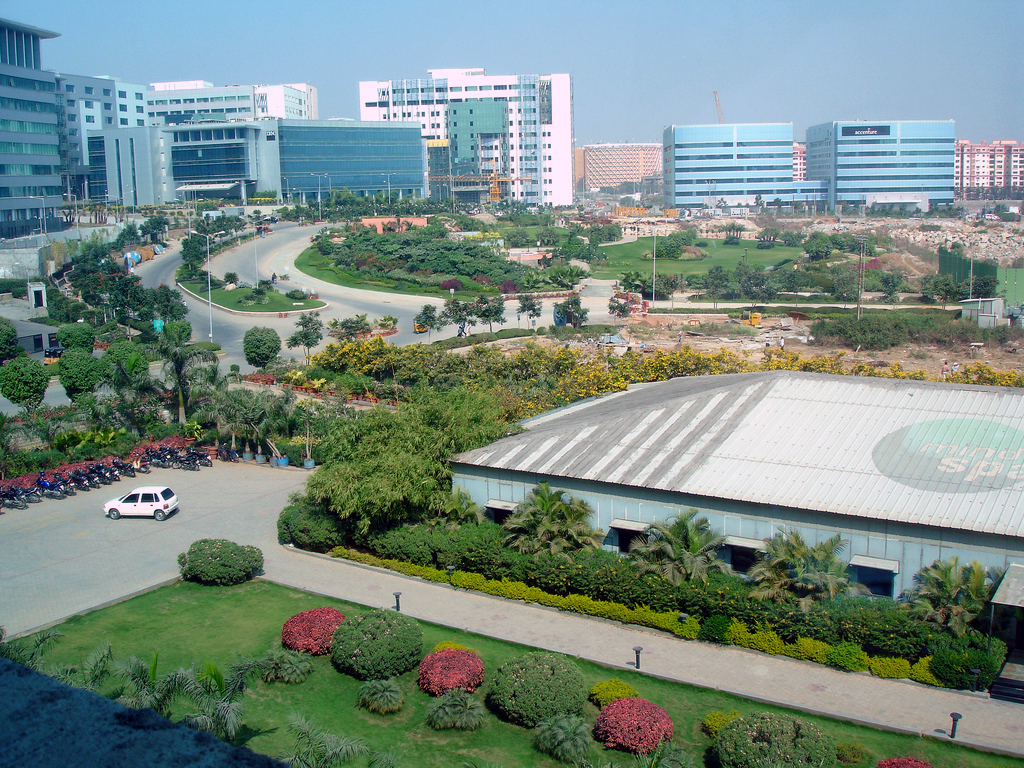
The Hyderabad Information Technology and Engineering Consultancy City or HITEC City is a major IT hub of Telangana

In terms of services, Hyderabad is usually nicknamed as Cyberabad due to its information technology foray and location of major software industries in the city. Prior to secession, it contributed 15% to India's and 98% to Andhra Pradesh's exports in IT and ITES sectors last 2013, with Hyderabad as in the front line of Telangana's aims to promote information technology in India, the city boasts the HITEC City as its premier hub.

=== Tourism ===
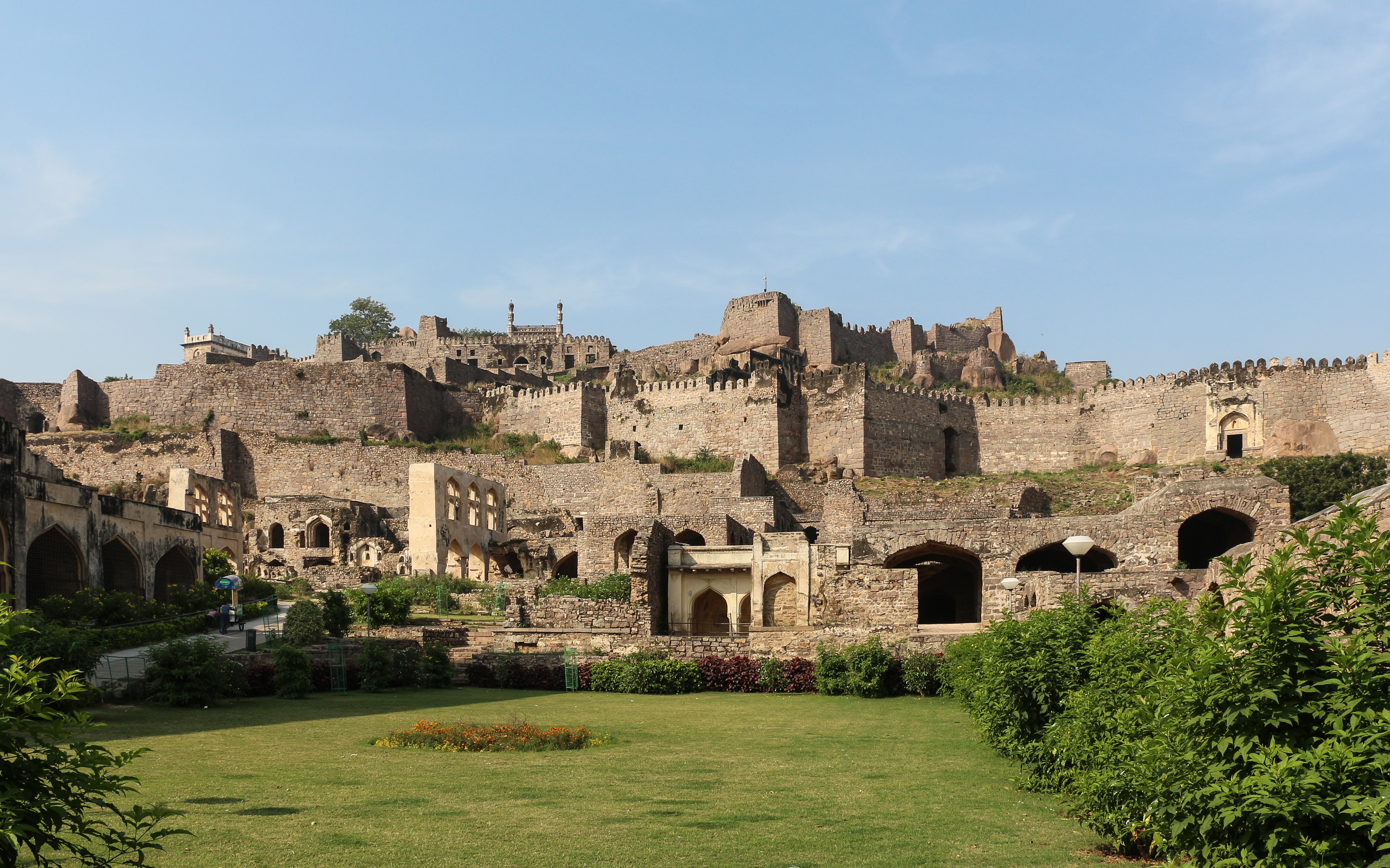
The Golconda Fort, Hyderabad

Telangana State Tourism Development Corporation (TSTDC) is a state government agency which promotes tourism in Telangana. Telangana has a variety of tourist attractions including historical places, monuments, forts, water falls, forests and temples.

== See also ==
- List of districts in Telangana by GDP
