= Yellareddy =

Yellareddy Yellareddi
- Census Town
- MUNICIPALITY
- Nicknames: Yellareddi, Yellareddy
- Location in telangana, India Yellareddy (India)
- Coordinates: 18°11′9.22″N 78°1′16.32″E
- Country: India
- State: Telangana
- District: Kamareddy

Government
  - Body: Municipality
  - MLA: Sri K. Madan Mohan Rao

Area
  - Total: 8.66 km^{2} (3.34 sq mi)

Population (2011)
  - Total: 14,923
  - Density: 1,720/km^{2} (4,460/sq mi)

Languages
  - Official: Telugu
- Time zone: UTC+5:30 (IST)
- PIN: 503122
- Telephone code: 08465
- Vehicle registration: TS 17
- Lok Sabha Constituency: Zahirabad
- Website: telangana.gov.in

Yellareddy is a census town and Revenue division in Kamareddy district of the Indian state of Telangana. It is located in Yellareddy mandal of Kamareddy District. It was previously in Nizamabad district.
