= Kandi, Sangareddy =

Kandi కంది
- Location in Telangana, India Kandi (India)
- Coordinates: 17.5829°N 78.1074°E
- Country: India
- State: Telangana
- District: Sangareddy

Government
  - Type: Panchayat
- Elevation: 574 m (1,883 ft)

Languages
  - Official: Telugu
- Time zone: UTC+5:30 (IST)
- Vehicle registration: TG 15
- Website: telangana.gov.in

Kandi is a Mandal in the Sangareddy district of Telangana, India consisting of 22 village panchayats. This mandal was formed as part of the reorganization of districts done by Telangana Government in 2016. This mandal was previously a part of Medak district. Villages in this mandal include:

1. Arutla
2. Begumpet
3. Byathole
4. Cheriyal
5. Cherlagudem
6. Chidruppa
7. Chimnapur
8. Erdanoor
9. Erdanoor Thanda
10. Indrakaran
11. Julkal
12. Kalvemula
13. Kandi (Village)
14. Kasipur
15. Koulampet
16. Makthaalloor
17. Mamidipalle
18. Thunikila Thanda
19. Topgonda
20. Utharpalle
21. Vaddanaguda Thanda
22. Yeddumailaram

Indian Institute of Technology Hyderabad is located in this mandal.
