= Eshwari Bai =

Indian politician

Member of the Andhra Pradesh Legislative Assembly
- In office 1967–1978
- Preceded by: T. N. Sadalakshmi
- Succeeded by: Tadur Bala Goud

Personal details
- Born: 1 December 1918 Chilkalguda
- Died: 25 February 1991 (aged 72) Hyderabad
- Party: Republican Party of India
- Children: Geeta Reddy, daughter
- Occupation: Politician

Portrait

Jetti Eshwari Bai (Note: Eshwari is sometimes spelled Eashwari and as Eswari. The name is sometimes conjoined as Eshwaribai.) (1 December 1918 – 25 February 1991) was an Indian politician, a Member of the Legislative Assembly and president of the Republican Party of India. She worked for the upliftment of the backward classes who were subjected to slavery and caste discrimination for generations by the upper castes.

== Life ==
Eshwari Bai was born on 1 December 1918. She started her career as a teacher in Paropakarini School in Secunderabad and later started a school named Geetha Vidyalaya in Chilkalguda, Secunderabad. She held workshops for the poor women of the locality, who learned crafting, tailoring, painting etc., helping economically poor women to secure to support themselves and their families.

Bai was elected as a councillor of the Secunderabad Municipal Corporation in 1950.

She founded the Civic Rights Committee (CRC) in the 1960s to contest the Hyderabad municipal elections as an apolitical party. It won four seats in those elections.

Inspired by B. R. Ambedkar, Bai joined the Scheduled Castes Federation (SCF) and in 1958, when SCF was renamed as the Republican Party of India (RPI), she was elected as general secretary. She went on to become the president of RPI later. In 1962 general elections she lost on RPI ticket from Yellareddy Assembly constituency, but won in the 1967 polls. She was the vice chairperson of the Telangana Praja Samithi (TPS) and won a ticket in 1972 elections again from Yellareddy on an RPI – TPS ticket.

As a chairperson of the Women and Child Welfare, Bai was instrumental in bringing legislation for free education of girl students up to higher education. She was the secretary of Indian Conference of Social Welfare and member of the Indian Red Cross Society. She also fought for separate statehood for Telangana in 1969 and was imprisoned at the Chanchalguda jail in Hyderabad.

== Personal life ==
Bai had four brothers and a sister. She was married to Jetti Laxminarayana, a dentist from Pune, at the age of 13. Her daughter, J. Geeta Reddy, is a politician with the Indian National Congress party.

Bai died on 25 February 1991.

The Eshwari Bai Memorial Award was instituted in her honour.
