= J. Geeta Reddy =

Indian politician and gynaecologist

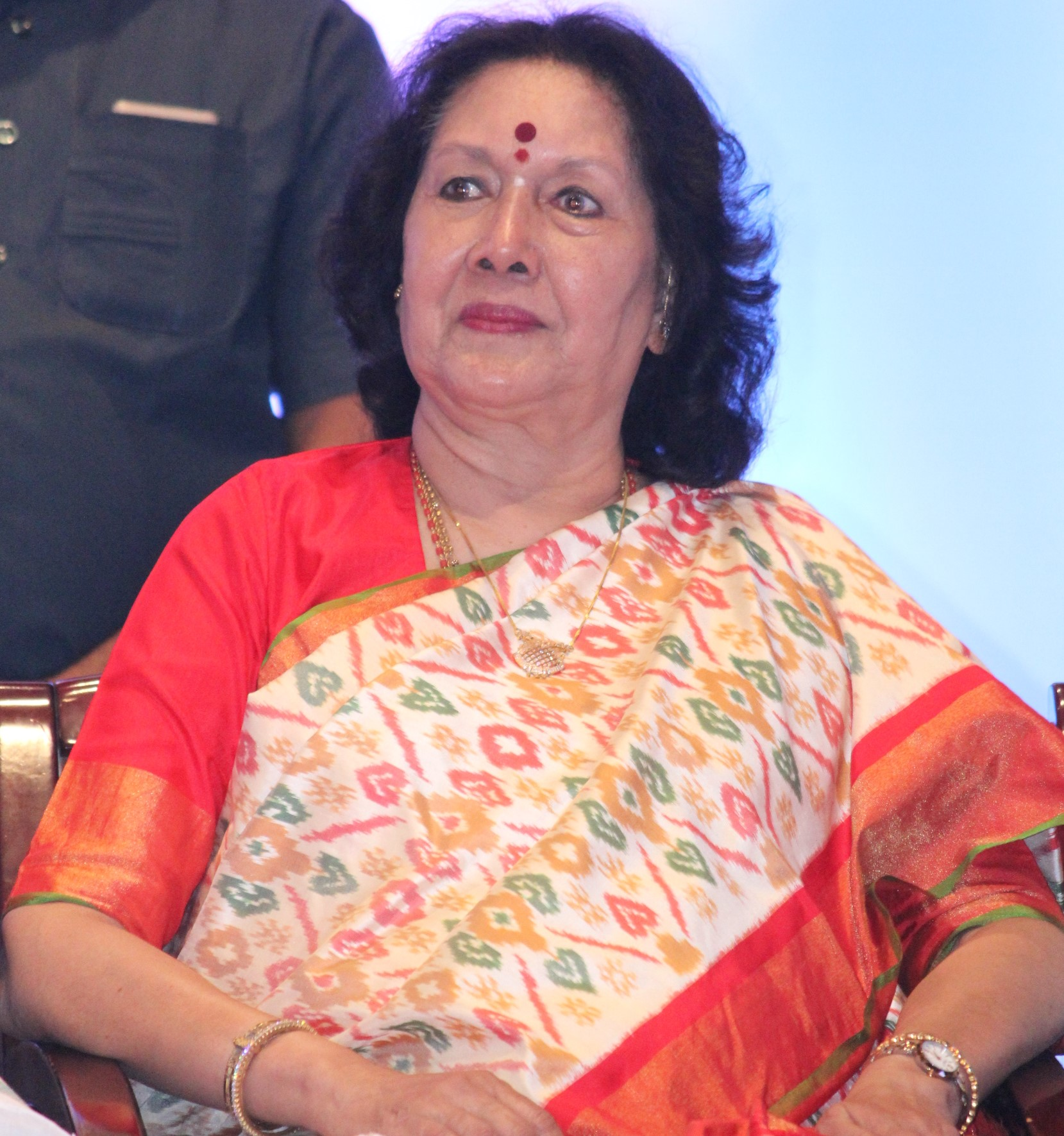

Member of Legislative Assembly, Telangana
- In office 2 June 2014 – 11 December 2018
- Preceded by: Telangana Assembly Created
- Succeeded by: Koninty Manik Rao
- Constituency: Zahirabad

Minister of Major Industries, Sugar, Commerce and Export Promotion Council Government of Andhra Pradesh
- In office 25 November 2010 – 21 February 2014

Minister of Tourism, Culture, FDC, Archaeology, Museums & Archives, I&PR, Cinematography Government of Andhra Pradesh
- In office 25 May 2009 – 24 November 2010

Minister of Tourism, Major Industries, Sugar, Commerce & Export promotion Council Government of Andhra Pradesh
- In office 14 May 2004 – 20 May 2009

Minister of Tourism, Culture, Social Welfare, Sports, Secondary Education and Protocol Government of Andhra Pradesh
- In office 1989–1994

Member of Legislative Assembly Andhra Pradesh
- In office 2009–2014
- Preceded by: Mohammed Fareeduddin
- Succeeded by: Telangana Assembly Created
- Constituency: Zahirabad
- In office 2004–2009
- Preceded by: B. Sanjeev Rao
- Succeeded by: Pusukunta Narsa Reddy
- Constituency: Gajwel
- In office 1989–1994
- Preceded by: B. Sanjeev Rao
- Succeeded by: G. Vijaya Rama Rao
- Constituency: Gajwel

Personal details
- Born: 17 April 1946 (age 80) Hyderabad, Hyderabad State, British India (present-day Telangana, India)
- Party: Indian National Congress
- Spouse: Ramachandra Reddy
- Children: 1
- Occupation: Gynaecologist

Jetti Geeta Reddy (Note: Her name is also spelled as Gita and Geetha) (born 1947) is an Indian gynecologist and politician of the Indian National Congress. She served as member of the Telangana Legislative Assembly representing the Zahirabad constituency of Sangareddy district from 2014 to 2018. She is the working president of Telangana Pradesh Congress Committee since July 2021.

Reddy has been a minister in the cabinets of various governments. She was also leader of the INC in the legislative assembly during the government of Konijeti Rosaiah.

== Early life ==
Geeta Reddy is the daughter of Eshwari Bai, a former Member of the Legislative Assembly (MLA) and President of the Republican Party of India. She studied medicine at Osmania Medical College, Hyderabad and became a Member of the Royal College of Obstetricians and Gynaecologists, London in 1989.

== Political career ==
She contested elections for the Andhra Pradesh Legislative Assembly in 1989 and became MLA for Gajwel in Medak district. She won that constituency again in 2004.

In the 2009 elections, Reddy was parachuted into the Zahirabad constituency, which had elected INC candidates in every election bar one since 1957. Converted to a seat reserved for candidates from the Scheduled Castes, the constituency had been held for a decade by the INC's Mohammed Fareeduddin, who commanded much local respect but was forced by this decision to contest the election elsewhere and lost. She won the seat and did so again in 2014, despite allegations that Fareeduddin had been encouraging his local supporters to vote for any party except the INC. On this occasion, the election was for a seat in the newly created Telangana Legislative Assembly that was created as part of the bifurcation of Andhra Pradesh.

Reddy was a minister in the cabinets of Marri Chenna Reddy, Kotla Vijaya Bhaskara Reddy and Y. S. Rajasekhar Reddy. She was the leader of the Congress Party in the legislative assembly during the Rosaiah government.

=== Member of Legislative Assembly ===
Year	Constituency
1989	Gajwel
2004	Gajwel
2009	Zahirabad
2014	Zahirabad

== Portfolios held ==
- 1989–1994: Minister for Tourism, Culture, Social Welfare, Sports, Secondary Education and Protocol.
- 1995–1998: General Secretary, Pradesh Congress Committee (PCC)
- 1998–2000: Executive Member of PCC
- 2000–2004: President, Andhra Pradesh Mahila Congress Committee.
- 2004–2009: Minister for Tourism, Sugar and Major Industries commerce and Export promotion.
- 2009–2010: Minister for Information and Public relations, Tourism, Culture, FDC, Archaeology, Museums & Archives, Cinematography.
- 2010–2014: Minister for Major Industries, Sugar, Commerce and Export promotion

Reddy was also for some time around 2013 in charge of the Home department in the Andhra Pradesh government whilst also holding the Major Industries portfolio. In the same year, the Telugu Desam Party had demanded that she be dismissed as a minister due to her being one of the co-accused named by the Central Bureau of Investigation in its work on a case relating to alleged illegal assets held by Y. S. Jaganmohan Reddy. The matter was dropped, with one of her co-accused, Mopidevi Venkataramana Rao, claiming that the Chief Minister, Kiran Kumar Reddy, had intervened.

In April 2016, Reddy was appointed chairman of the Telangana Legislative Assembly's Public Accounts Committee.

== Electoral History ==
=== Legislative Assembly ===
Year	Constituency	Party	Votes	%	Opponent	Party	Votes	%	Result	Margin	%
2018	Zahirabad	INC	62,125	32.89	Koninty Manik Rao	TRS	96,598	51.14	Lost	-34,473	-18.25
2014	Zahirabad	INC	57,558	34.68	Koninty Manik Rao	TRS	56,716	34.17	Won	+842	+0.51
2009	Zahirabad	INC	62,758	40.89	Y. Narotham	TDP	60,572	39.46	Won	+2,186	+1.43
2004	Gajwel	INC	71,955	56.78	D. Durgaiah	TDP	47,695	37.64	Won	+24,260	+19.14
1999	Gajwel	INC	54,908	47.98	B. Sanjeeva Rao	TDP	57,335	50.10	Lost	-2,427	-2.12
1994	Gajwel	INC	32,942	32.11	G. Vijaya Rama Rao	TDP	52,234	50.92	Lost	-19,292	-18.81
1989	Gajwel	INC	48,974	50.15	B. Sanjeeva Rao	TDP	45,616	46.71	Won	+3,358	+3.44

== Personal life ==
J. Geeta Reddy is married to Dr. Ramachandra Reddy. She has a daughter.

Around 1980, after Reddy's husband had suffered a stroke and was not responding well to conventional medicine, the couple visited Sathya Sai Baba. She has expressed admiration for him, noting that her husband's health began to improve soon after the meeting, and has been described as a devotee.
