= Patlolla Sanjeeva Reddy =

Indian politician

Patlolla Sanjeev Reddy

Member of the Telangana Legislative Assembly
- Incumbent
- Assumed office 3 December 2023 – present
- Preceded by: Mahareddy Bhupal Reddy, (BRS)
- Constituency: Narayankhed

Personal details
- Born: 16 May 1962 (age 63) Narayankhed, Medak district, Andhra Pradesh (present–day Sangareddy district, Telangana), India
- Party: Indian National Congress
- Parent: Patlolla Kishta Reddy (father)

Patlolla Sanjeeva Kista Reddy (born 1962) is an Indian politician from Telangana. He is serving as MLA from Narayankhed Constituency, having been elected in the 2023 Telangana Legislative Assembly election from the Indian National Congress representing the Narayankhed Assembly constituency.

== Early life ==
Sanjeev Reddy hails from Narayankhed, Sangareddy, and was born there. His father, Patlolla Kista Reddy, served as a member of the Telangana Legislative Assembly.

KCR meets Sanjeev Reddy before election due to his reach to people and elected as MLA in 2023.

== Career ==
Patlolla Sanjeev Reddy is a doctor and served the people of Naraynakhed at low cost. He entered politics at a young age supporting his father during campaigning. In 2008 he directly entered into electoral politics by contesting as Naraynakhed ZPTC and won from congress. In 2013 he was again elected as a Mandal Parishad President early in his political career. In 2015, following the death of his father, Reddy contested the MLA seat from the Narayankhed constituency in 2016 but lost to Mahareddy Bhupal Reddy.

In the 2018 Telangana state general election, he joined the Bharatiya Janata Party, leaving the INC and got nearly 34% votes to BJP which is he his in the list of top 10 highest secured vote's to BJP candidates in entire state. However, he was defeated by Mahareddy Bhupal Reddy once again. In the 2019 lok sabha General election, Reddy rejoined the INC and did several party program under the leadership of TPCC president. However 2023 assembly general election contested the Assembly seat again from INC. This time, he emerged victorious against the sitting MLA Bhupal Reddy. Currently, he is serving as a member of the legislative assembly from the Narayankhed constituency.
