= Kalher =

- village
- Interactive map of Kalher
- Coordinates: 18.1902°N 77.8453°E
- Country: India
- State: Telangana
- District: Sangareddy district
- Mandal: Kalher Mandal

Government
  - Type: Grama Panchayat
  - Body: Gram Panchayat of kalher

Area
  - Total: 13 km^{2} (5.0 sq mi)

Population (2021)
  - Total: 4,441
  - Density: 340/km^{2} (880/sq mi)
- Demonym: kalherkar

Languages
  - Official: Telugu
- Time zone: UTC+5:30 (IST)
- Pin code: 502371
- Vehicle registration: TS
- Vidhan Sabha constituency: Narayankhed
- Website: telangana.gov.in

Kalher is a town and Mandal headquarters located in Sangareddy district in the Indian state of Telangana.

(The villages in Kalher includes: Khanapur (K), Anthergaon, Bachepalle, Bibipet, Gosaipally, Hungera, Kadpal, Kalher, Krishnapur, Mardi, Masanpalle, Mubarakpur, Mungepalle, Mirkhanpet, Nagdhar, Nallvagu Pochapoor, Ramreddipet, Raparthy, Sirgapoor, Sultanabad, Fathepur, Mahadevpally, Malharpur.)
