= Shetkar Suresh Kumar =

Indian politician

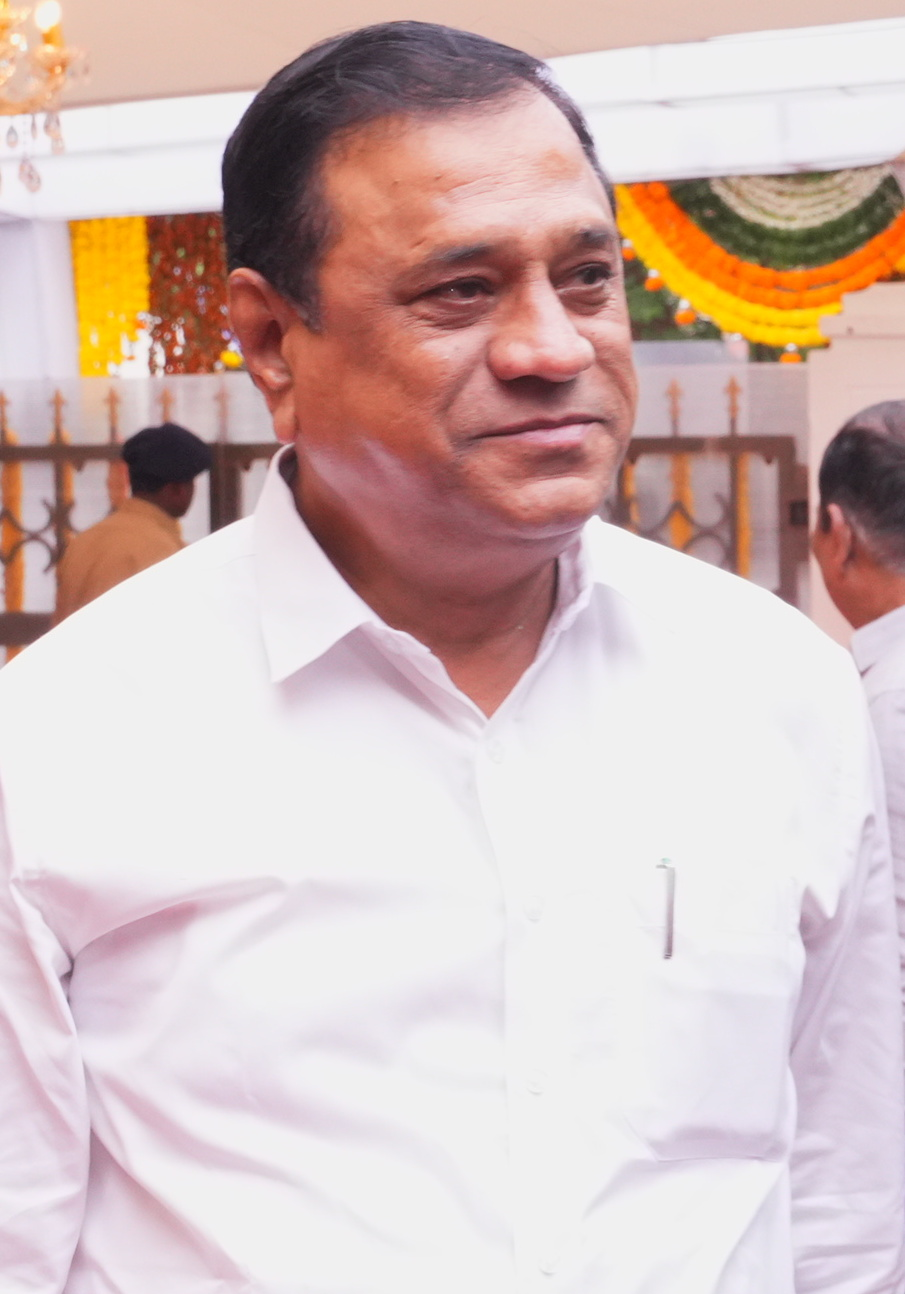

Member of Parliament, Lok Sabha
- Incumbent
- Assumed office 4 June 2024
- Preceded by: B. B. Patil
- Constituency: Zahirabad
- In office 1 June 2009 – 1 June 2014
- Preceded by: Lok Sabha constituency created (Andhra Pradesh)
- Succeeded by: Lok Sabha constituency shifted to Telangana

Member of the Andhra Pradesh Legislative Assembly
- In office 2004–2009
- Preceded by: Patlolla Kista Reddy
- Succeeded by: Patlolla Kista Reddy

Personal details
- Born: 8 August 1960 (age 66) Narayankhed, Medak district, Andhra Pradesh, (present–day Sangareddy district, Telangana) India
- Party: Indian National Congress
- Spouse: Uma Shetkar
- Children: 3
- Occupation: Politician

Shetkar Suresh Kumar Shivrao (born 8 August 1960) is an Indian politician and a member of the 15th Lok Sabha. He is elected as the Senior Vice President of Telangana Pradesh Congress Committee in 2021 He belongs to the Indian National Congress political party and he represented Zahirabad constituency in Telangana. Suresh Shetkar was a Member of legislative assembly from Narayankhed constituency from 2004 to 2009.

He has been serving as Vice President since 2021 within the Telangana Pradesh Congress Committee and is currently 18th Lok Sabha member from Zahirabad Lok Sabha Constituency Telangana.

== Early life ==
Suresh Shetkar was born in Naranyankhed, Medak to Shivrao Shetkar, a freedom fighter and three-time MLA and Chandramma. He did his B.Sc. (Agriculture) at Marathwada Agricultural University Parbhani, Maharashtra.

== Personal life ==
Suresh Shetkar is 2nd born in the family and is married to Uma and has a son and two daughters. He has a sister and 3 brothers.

== Career ==
His father gave a Congress party ticket to P. Kista Reddy who was a follower of Shivrao Shetkar according to an agreement who apparently deceived before by going independent and later was first time elected as An MLA from Narayankhed Constituency in 2004. Suresh Shetkar was elected to Zahirabad Lok Sabha as an MP constituency in 2009.

== Electoral History ==
=== Lok Sabha ===
Year	Constituency	Party	Votes	%	Opponent	Party	Votes	%	Result	Margin	%
2009	Zahirabad	INC	395,767	38.90	Syed Yousuf Ali	TRS	378,360	37.19	Won	+17,407	+1.71
2014	Zahirabad	INC	364,030	33.10	B.B. Patil	TRS	508,661	46.25	Lost	−144,631	−13.15
2024	Zahirabad	INC	528,418	42.73	B. B. Patil	BJP	482,230	38.99	Won	+46,188	+3.74
