= Raikode =

Coordinates: 17°50′N 77°45′E

- Village
- Interactive map of Raikode
- Country: India
- State: Telangana
- District: Sangareddy

Languages
  - Official: telugu
- Time zone: UTC+5:30 (IST)
- Vehicle registration: TG–15
- Website: telangana.gov.in

Raikode is a village in Sangareddy district of Telangana, India.
