= Andole–Jogipet =

Andole
- Town
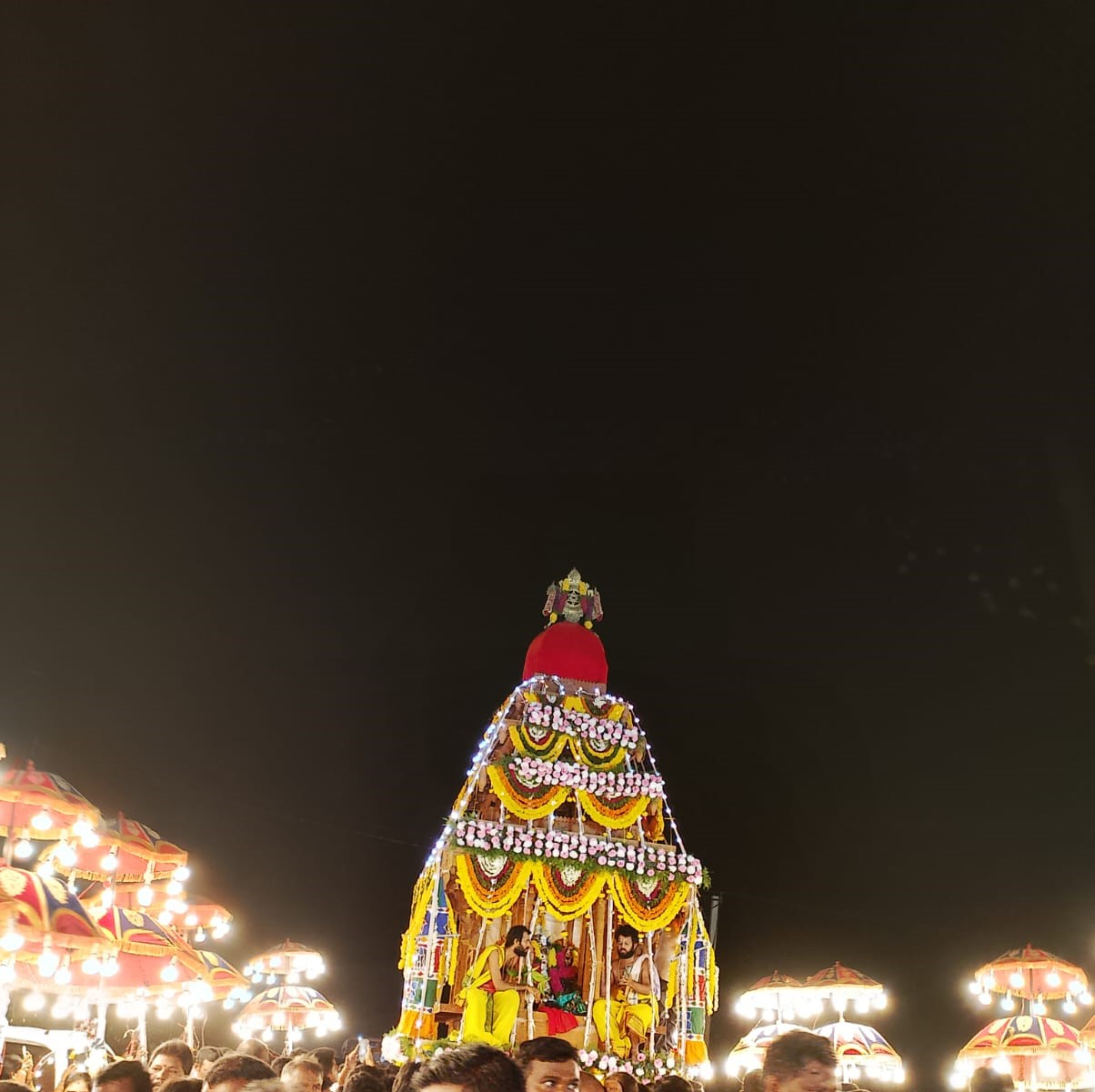
- Rukmini Sametha Sri Krishna Rathotsav
- Interactive map of Andole
- Coordinates: 17°49′N 78°04′E
- Country: India
- State: Telangana
- District: Sangareddy

Area
  - Total: 21.61 km^{2} (8.34 sq mi)

Population (2011)
  - Total: 18,494
  - Density: 855.8/km^{2} (2,217/sq mi)

Languages
  - Official: Telugu, Urdu
- Time zone: UTC+5:30 (IST)
- Postal code: 502273 or 502270
- Vehicle registration: TG15
- Website: andoljogipetmunicipality.telangana.gov.in

Andole–Jogipet is a town and revenue division, municipality in Sangareddy district of Telangana, India. It is a conurbation of two towns, Andole and Jogipet. It was formed as a Nagar panchayat in 2013, and was upgraded to municipality in 2018. and became Revenue Division in 2020

== History ==
The first conference of Andhra Mahasabha was held in 1930 at Jogipet under the chairmanship of Suravaram Pratapareddy.

Andole is considered as a great ancient Kingdom which was ruled by Rani Shankaramma, on her name Telangana State Government placed a lesson in 7th class which showcases her brilliance.

Andole is the reason behind the names of Major towns in Sangareddy District i.e., Sangareddy on Shankaramma father name Sangareddy, Sadashivapet on her son name Sada Shivudu.

== Demographics ==
As per 2011 Census, the jurisdiction of the civic body is spread over an area of 21.61 km^{2} (8.34 mi^{2}), with a population of 18,496.

== Government and politics ==
The town falls under Andole (SC) constituency of Telangana Legislative Assembly. Chanti Kranti Kiran from Telangana Rashtra Samithi was elected as its MLA in 2018. Previously Damodar Raja Narasimha, former deputy chief minister of Andhra Pradesh state and Babu Mohan are elected from this constituency.

Andole–Jogipet revenue division was created in July 2020.

== In popular culture ==
Jogipet was featured in the Telugu film Jathi Ratnalu. The film was shot in the town and the main trio in this film belong to Jogipet where Naveen Polishetty played the role of Jogipet Srikanth.

Srikanth is said to have been the B.Tech. topper of Jogipet.
