= Nagareddipet =

Coordinates: 18°08′38″N 78°07′45″E

- Village
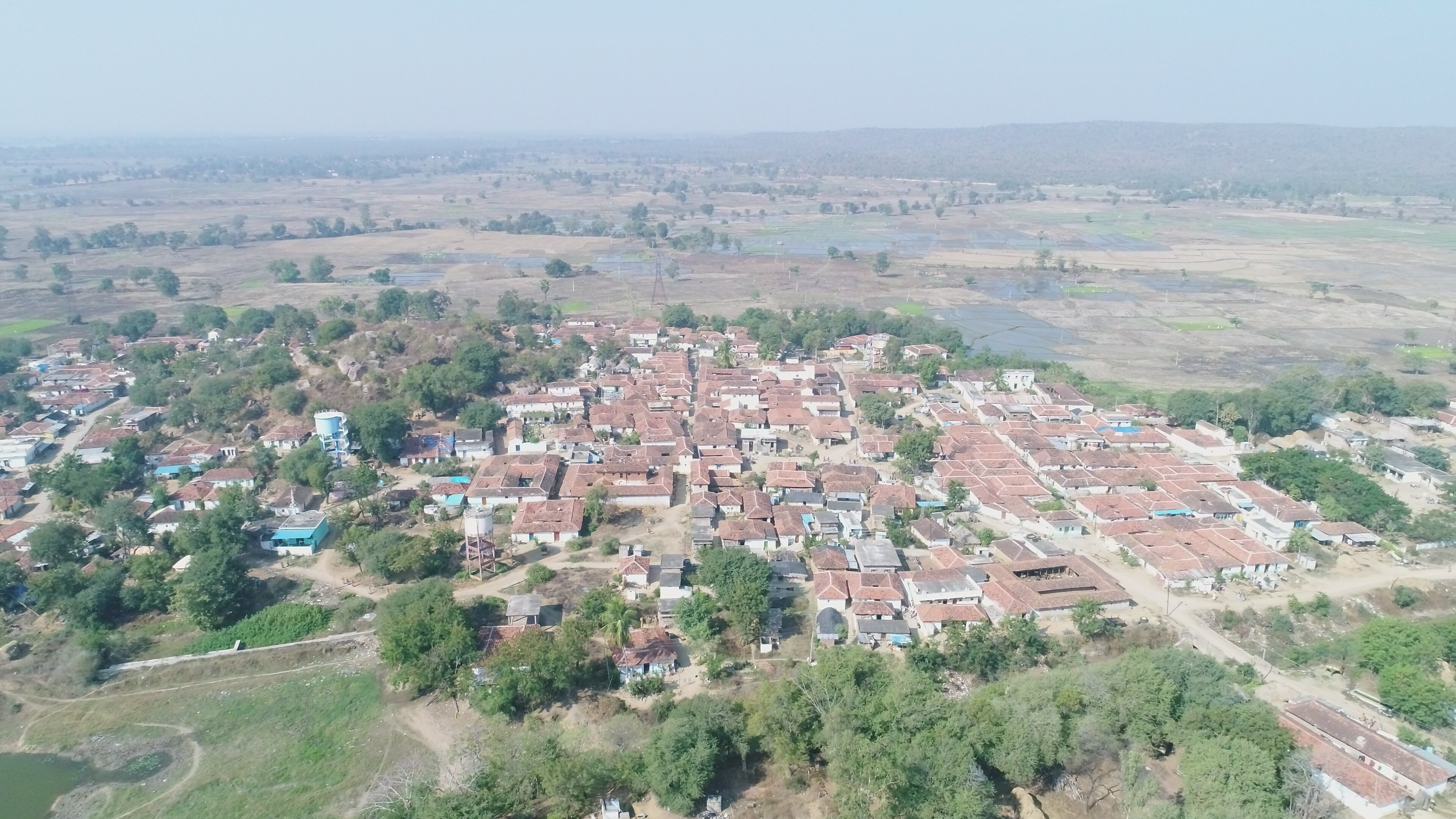
- Interactive map of Nagareddipet
- Country: India
- State: Telangana
- District: Kamareddy

Nagareddipet is a mandal and settlement in Nizamabad, Andhra Pradesh, India. It is located on the Kamareddy/Medak border, around 21 km from Medak Town. Villages under it as a mandal include Tandoor, Jalalpur, Venkampally, Chinnoor, Malthumedha, Lingampally, and Atmakur.

As of the 2011 Indian census, the mandal contains 8,130 households and 34,601 people.
