= K. Madan Mohan Rao =

Indian politician

Member of the Telangana Legislative Assembly
- Incumbent
- Assumed office 2023
- Preceded by: Jajala Surender

Personal details
- Party: Indian National Congress

K. Madan Mohan Rao (born 1969) is an Indian politician from Telangana state. He is an MLA from Yellareddy Assembly constituency in Nizamabad district. He represents Indian National Congress Party and won the 2023 Telangana Legislative Assembly election.

== Early life and education ==
Rao is from Khairatabad, Hyderabad. His father K. Rajeshwar Rao was a teacher. He is a businessman. He did his schooling in 1984 at Zilla Parishad High School, Mosra, Nizamabad. Later, he did his intermediate at GVS Junior College in Kamareddy, Nizamabad from 1984 to 1986. After his bachelors in 1993, he completed his M.S. in agriculture in 1996 at NG Ranga Agriculture University, Hyderabad. Later, he did his graduation in business administration in 2017 at the Wharton Business School in 2017.

== Career ==
Rao won from Yellareddy Assembly constituency representing Indian National Congress in the 2023 Telangana Legislative Assembly election. He polled 86,989 votes and defeated his nearest rival, and sitting MLA Jajala Surendar of Bharat Rashtra Samithi, by a margin of 24,001 votes.
