= List of districts of Telangana =

Districts of Telangana
- Districts of Telangana
- Category: Districts
- Location: Telangana
- Number: 33 districts
- Populations: Mulugu – 257,744 (lowest); Hyderabad – 3,943,323 (highest)
- Areas: Hyderabad – 217 km^{2} (84 sq mi) (smallest); Bhadradri Kothagudem – 7,483 km^{2} (2,889 sq mi) (largest)
- Government: Government of Telangana
- Subdivisions: Revenue Divisions of Telangana

The Indian state of Telangana has 33 districts, each headed by a District collector.

== History ==
Telangana at the time of formation on 2 June 2014.

Telangana region of Hyderabad State consisted of 8 Districts in 1948 when it was inducted in Dominion of India; they are Hyderabad, Mahbubnagar, Medak, Nalgonda, Nizamabad, Adilabad, Karimnagar and Warangal districts. Khammam district was created by bifurcation of Warangal district on 1 October 1957. Andhra Pradesh was formed by merging Telangana region of Hyderabad State and Andhra state on 1 November 1956. Bhadrachalam division and Aswaraopet taluka parts was merged in Khammam district from Godavari districts for better Administration. Hyderabad district was split into Hyderabad Urban District and Hyderabad Rural District on 15 August 1978. Hyderabad Urban District was made by 4 Talukas are Charminar, Golkonda, Mushirabad and Secunderabad Talukas which consist of only MCH area, Secunderabad cantonment and Osmania University. Hyderabad rural district was later renamed as Ranga Reddy District.

On 2 June 2014, when Telangana was carved out as India's 29th state with 10 districts from then Andhra Pradesh state, seven mandals of Bhadrachalam division were given back to East Godavari district. On 11 October 2016, 21 new districts were created, which led to total 31 districts in Telangana. All districts were divided into minimum 2 to maximum 5 except Hyderabad district which was untouched. Two new districts, Mulugu and Narayanpet were created on 17 February 2019, taking the total number of districts to 33.

== List of District ==
In terms of area, Bhadradri Kothagudem is the largest district with an area of 7,483 km^{2} (2,889 mi^{2}) and Hyderabad is the smallest with 217 km^{2} (84 mi^{2}). Hyderabad district is the most populated district with a population of 39,43,323 and Mulugu district is the least populated with 2,94,671. Telangana consist of 74 Revenue Divisions and 594 Revenue Mandals (Tehsil).

Sl No	Name	Headquarters	Area (km^{2})	Population (2011 census)	No.of mandals	Density (per km^{2})	Urban (%)	Literacy (%)	Sex ratio	Map
1	Adilabad	Adilabad	4,153	708,972	18	171	23.66	63.46	978	
2	Kumuram Bheem Asifabad	Asifabad	4,878	515,812	15	106	16.86	56.72	998	
3	Mancherial	Mancherial	4,016	807,037	18	201	43.85	64.35	977	
4	Nirmal	Nirmal	3,845	709,418	19	185	21.38	57.77	1046	
5	Nizamabad	Nizamabad	4,288	1,571,022	34	366	29.58	64.25	1044	
6	Jagtial	Jagtial	2,419	985,417	18	407	22.46	60.26	1036	
7	Peddapalli	Peddapalli	2,236	795,332	14	356	38.22	65.52	992	
8	Kamareddy	Kamareddy	3,652	972,625	22	266	12.71	56.51	1033	
9	Rajanna Sircilla	Sircilla	2,019	552,037	13	273	21.17	62.71	1014	
10	Karimnagar	Karimnagar	2,128	1,005,711	16	473	30.72	69.16	993	
11	Jayashankar Bhupalpally	Bhupalpally	2,293	416,763	12	180	7.57	58.97	1009	
12	Sangareddy	Sangareddy	4,403	1,527,628	26	347	34.69	64.08	965	
13	Medak	Medak	2,786	767,428	20	275	7.67	56.12	1027	
14	Siddipet	Siddipet	3,632	1,012,065	22	279	13.74	61.61	1008	
15	Jangaon	Jangaon	2,188	566,376	13	259	12.60	61.60	997	
16	Hanumakonda	Hanumakonda	1,309	1,080,858	11	826	68.51	76.17	997	
17	Warangal	Warangal	2,175	718,537	15	330	6.99	61.26	994	
18	Mulugu	Mulugu	3,881	257,744	09	66	05	62.26	968	
19	Bhadradri kothagudem	Kothagudem	7,483	1,069,261	23	143	31.71	66.40	1008	
20	Khammam	Khammam	4,361	1,401,639	21	321	22.60	65.95	1005	
21	Mahabubabad	Mahabubabad	2,877	774,549	16	269	9.86	57.13	996	
22	Suryapet	Suryapet	3,607	1,099,560	23	305	15.56	64.11	996	
23	Nalgonda	Nalgonda	7,122	1,618,416	31	227	22.76	63.75	978	
24	Yadadri Bhuvanagiri	Bhuvanagiri	3,092	739,448	16	239	16.66	65.2402221	973	
25	Medchal–Malkajgiri	Shamirpet	1,084	2,440,073	14	2251	91.40	82.48	957	
26	Hyderabad	Hyderabad	217	3,943,323	16	18172	100	83.25	954	
27	Ranga Reddy	Shamshabad	5,031	2,446,265	27	486	58.05	71.88	950	
28	Vikarabad	Vikarabad	3,386	927,140	18	274	13.48	57.91	1001	
29	Narayanpet	Narayanpet	2336	566,874	11	240	7.36	49.93	1009	
30	Mahabubnagar	Mahabubnagar	2,738	919,903	26	340	20.73	60.97	995	
31	Nagarkurnool	Nagarkurnool	6,545	893,308	22	142	10.19	54.38	968	
32	Wanaparthy	Wanaparthy	2,152	577,758	14	268	15.97	55.67	960	
33	Jogulamba Gadwal	Gadwal	2,928	609,990	12	208	10.36	49.87	972	
-	Total	–	112,077	35,003,674	584	312	38.88	66.54	988	–

== See also ==
- List of mandals in Telangana
- List of districts in India
- List of districts in Telangana by GDP
