= Zaheerabad =

- Town
- Zaheerabad
- Location in Telangana, India Zaheerabad (India)
- Coordinates: 17.68°N 77.62°E
- Country: India
- State: Telangana
- District: Sangareddy
- Lok Sabha constituency: Zahirabad
- Assembly constituency: Zahirabad
- Named for: Mohammad Zaheeruddin Khan (Nawab Zaheer Yar Jung Bahadur)

Government
  - Type: Municipal Council
  - Body: Zaheerabad Municipal Council

Area
  - Town: 21.78 km^{2} (8.41 sq mi)
- Elevation: 622 m (2,041 ft)

Population (2011)
  - Town: 71,166
  - Rank: 23rd in Telangana
  - Density: 3,267/km^{2} (8,463/sq mi)
  - Metro: 82,442
- Demonym: Zaheerabadi

Languages
  - Official: Telugu; Urdu
- Time zone: UTC+5:30 (IST)
- Postal code: 502220
- ISO 3166 code: IN-TG
- Vehicle registration: TG–15

Zaheerabad is an industrial city and Municipal council in Sangareddy district of the Indian state of Telangana.

Zahirabad is also the base for visitors of ancient sacred places, Ketaki Sangameshwara Swamy Devasthanam at Jharasangam, Siddhhi Vinayaka Temple at Rejinthal and Hazrath Multani Baba Dargah at Metalkunta. 500

== Location ==
Zahirabad lies 100 kilometres (62 mi) northwest of Hyderabad on the Mumbai highway (National highway 65).

== Town name ==
Zahirabad - The name of the city was coined by a Paigah noble called Nawab Mohammad Zaheeruddin Khan (Nawab Zaheer Yar Jung Bahadur). He was the first born son of Nawab Moin-Ud-Dowlah Bahadur Asman Jah. The Paigah family or clan were a Sufi Islamic aristocratic family of Hyderabad state.

== History ==
Important points in the history of Zaheerabad include the drought of 1972 and the Hyderabad Police Action of 1949.

== Demographics ==
In 2001, the census population of Zaheerabad was 140,160. Sixteen percent of people were under six years of age. The rate of literacy was 59.5 percent, higher than the national average. Women were less literate than men (55 percent to 69 percent).

The common languages spoken are Telugu, Urdu, Kannada and Marathi.

As of 2011 census of India, the urban agglomeration population of the city was 71,166.

== Government and politics ==
Zaheerabad Municipality was constituted in 1952 and is classified as a third grade municipality with 24 election wards. The jurisdiction of the civic body is spread over an area of 21.78 km^{2} (8.41 mi^{2}). The urban agglomeration includes the municipality of Zahirabad, the census town of Allipur, out growths of Pastapur, Tamadpalle, Hyderabad, Hothi (K) and part of the out growths of Buchnelli village.

== Economy ==
Zaheerabad is an agricultural area. Farming has struggled due to dry lands becoming fallow and the loss of a variety of crop types such as cereals, pulses and oilseeds. The Deccan Development Society (DDS) has assisted local women to become empowered in the economy and in society. In small groups called sangams, they have succeeded in developing food security and making charity endeavours.

In March 2013, a tractor manufacturer M&M opened near Zahirabad providing employment. Other industries include sugar refining, rubber manufacturing and chemical manufacturing. Mahindra & Mahindra, through its multiple plants in Zaheerabad, provides employment to many young engineers in Zaheerabad and its suburbs.

== Jharasangam ==
In the vicinity of Zahirabad, there is an ancient temple of Lord Shiva, called "Jharasangam ".This is an old Shiva temple known as Kethaki Sangameshwara Swamy situated at Jharasangam village and Mandal, Sangareddy District. The Shiva Lingam is said to have been established by Lord Brahma. It is said that Raja Kupendra, king of Surya Vamsha during Krutha Yug was ailing from skin disease and had not found any remedies. One day in his routine hunting it happened to reach the Kethaki Vanam and found a stream, where he washed his body. After reaching home he found that the skin disease was completely cured and in the same night Lord Sangameshwara appeared in a dream, asked the Raja to construct a sanitorium over Shiva Lingam. The Raja Kupendra constructed the temple over Shiva Lingam and converted the stream into a pushkarini and it is also called as Astha Theertha Amrutha Gundam. It is also called as Dakshina Kasi.

Due to historical and religious importance, the people from Karnataka, Maharashtra and Andhra Pradesh (Telangana areas) visit the temple and pay homage to Lord, and perform Gunda Pooja.

It is also said that Brahma after creating the world came to the spot for meditation. Since the existing Bhanakara Lingam has been installed by Brahma, Pujas are being performed by Kethaki flowers (generally Kethaki flowers are not used for puja), and also the Pushkarini which is consisting of eight theerthas (Narayana, Dharna, rushi, Varuna, Soma, Rudra, Indira and Datha) the Lord is called as “Kethaki Sangameshwara.

== Transport ==
=== RTC buses ===
ZAHIRABAD - ZHB Tgsrtc bus depot runs buses to various places in the state. KSRTC buses also runs from Zahirabad bus station to various parts of the states of Telangana, AP, Maharashtra and Karnataka.

=== Trains ===
Trains run from (Zahirabad) to Bangalore, Mangalore, Nanded, Shirdi, Pune, Visakhapatnam, Vijayawada, Machlipatnam and Warangal, Hyderabad

== Amenities ==
Typical of an Indian town of its size, Zahirabad has a number of banks, public and independent schools and colleges, shops, hotels, hospitals and other services.

== See also ==
- Zahirabad (Lok Sabha constituency)
