= Narayankhed =

- Town
- Location in Telangana, India Narayankhed (India)
- Coordinates: 18.03333°N 77.78333°E
- Country: India
- State: Telangana
- District: Sangareddy
- Municipal established: 1 August 2018 (8 years ago)
- Founder: Government of Telangana

Government
  - Type: Municipal council
  - Body: Narayankhed Municipal Council

Area
  - Total: 7.51 km^{2} (2.90 sq mi)
- Elevation: 10 m (33 ft)

Population (2011)
  - Total: 18,243
  - Density: 2,430/km^{2} (6,290/sq mi)
- Demonym: Narayankhedkar

Languages
  - Official: Telugu
- Time zone: UTC+5:30 (IST)
- PIN: 502286
- Telephone code: 08456
- Vehicle registration: TS–15
- Website: telangana.gov.in

Narayankhed is a town and revenue division in Sangareddy district of the Indian state of Telangana.

== Demographics ==
As of 2011 Indian Census, Narayankhed census town had a total population of 15,610, of which 7,963 were males and 7,647 were females. Population within the age group of 0 to 6 years was 2,069. The total number of literates in Narayankhed was 10,198, which constituted 65.3% of the population with male literacy of 72.4% and female literacy of 57.9%. The effective literacy rate of 7+ population of Narayankhed was 75.3%, of which male literacy rate was 83.7% and female literacy rate was 66.6%. The Scheduled Castes and Scheduled Tribes population was 1,136 and 247 respectively. Narayankhed had 3014 households in 2011.

== Administration ==
=== Revenue villages in the Mandal ===
- Hungarga (K)
- Chaptakhadim
- Ryakal
- Kanjipur
- Sanjeevanrao pet
- Ryalamadugu
- Nizampet
- Namalimet
- Narasapur
- Kondapur
- Chandkhanpally
- Gangapur
- Nagpur
- Allapur
- Hungarga (b)
- Abbenda
- Gadtihokrana { G. Hukrana}
- Mansoorpur
- Narayankhed
- Venkatapur
- Hanmantraupet
- Madhavar
- Lingapur
- Jukkal
- Chandapur
- Antwar
- Bhanapur
- Jujalpur
- Jagannathpur
- Pipri
- Panchgaon
- Paidpally
- Satgaon
- Anantasagar
- Rudrar

=== Nearby Mandals ===
South: Manoor, East: Regode, Sankarampet (a) Alladurg [Nagalgidda]
