= Sangareddy district =

- District of Telangana
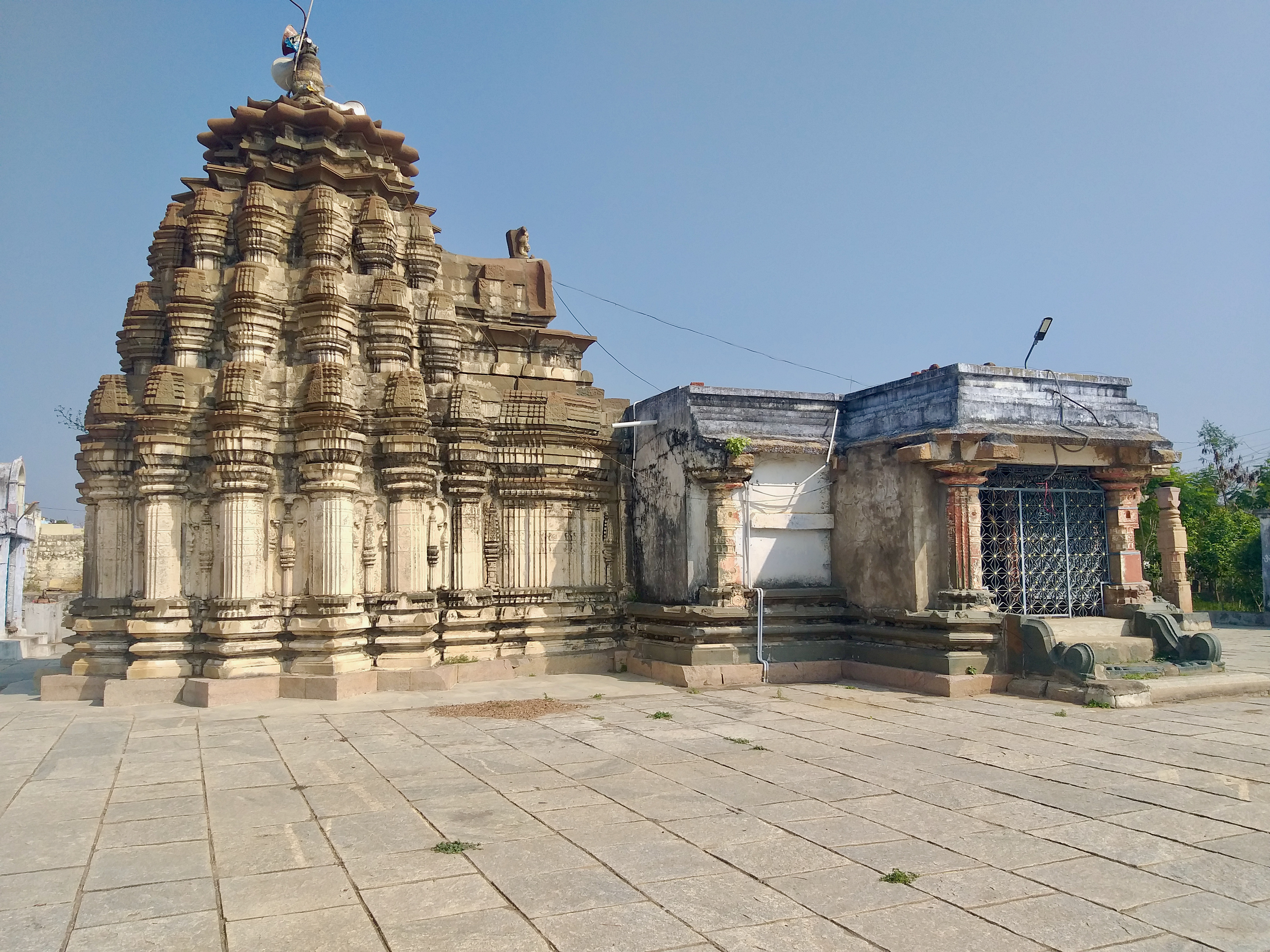
- Ramalingeshwara temple, Nandikandi

- Location in Telangana
- Sangareddy district
- Coordinates (Sangareddy): 17.780532, 77.892057
- Country: India
- State: Telangana
- Mandals: 28
- Formation: 11 October 2016 (10 years ago)
- Founder: Government of Telangana
- Headquarters: Sangareddy
- Revenue Divisions: 04: Zaheerabad revenue division; Narayankhed revenue division; Sangareddy revenue division; Jogipet-Andole revenue division

Government
  - Type: Zilla Panchayath
  - Body: Sangareddy Zilla Panchayath
  - Collector: Sri Prateek Jain, I.A.S

Area
  - Total: 4,464 km^{2} (1,724 sq mi)

Population (2015)
  - Total: 1,527,628
  - Density: 342.2/km^{2} (886.3/sq mi)
- Time zone: UTC+05:30 (IST)
- Vehicle registration: TG 15
- Major highways: National Highway 161; National Highway 65
- Per Capita Income (2022-23): ₹322,394 (US$4,101.47)
- Nominal GDP (2022-23): ₹60,401.37 crore (US$7.68 billion)
- Website: sangareddy.telangana.gov.in

Sangareddy district is a district located in the western region of the Indian state of Telangana. This district contains a part of the Hyderabad Metropolitan Region.Sangareddy is the district headquarters of the district. Sangareddy was named after Raja Sangareddy, the father of Maharani Shankaramma, ruler of the Papannapet Samsthanam. The district shares boundaries with Medak, Medchal, Vikarabad, Kamareddy and Rangareddy districts and with the state boundary of Karnataka.

== History ==
Sangareddy (earlier known as Sangareddypeta) was founded in the 18th century by Maharani Shankaramma, ruler of the Papannapet Samsthanam (also referred to as Andole Rajyam), and named in honour of her father, Raja Sangareddy. The town and much of the undivided Medak region constituted the heartland of the Andole Rajyam principality under notable rulers including Raja Ramadurga Venkata Narasimha Reddy (1720–1760), Rani Lingayamma II (1760–1764), and Shankaramma herself.

== Geography ==
The district is spread over an area of 4,464.87 square kilometres (1,723.90 sq mi).

== Demographics ==
Religion in Sangareddy district (2011)
Hinduism	81.64%
Islam	15.99%
Christianity	1.54%
Other or not stated	0.83%

At the time of the 2011 census, Sangareddy district had a population of 1,527,628. Sangareddy has a sex ratio of 965 females per 1000 males and a literacy rate of 64.03%. 194,674 (12.76%) were under 6 years of age. 529,965 (34.73%) lived in urban areas. Scheduled Castes and Scheduled Tribes made up 276,595 (18.13%) and 86,410 (5.66%) of the population respectively.

Languages of Sangareddy district (2011)
1. Telugu (71.2%)
2. Urdu (15.5%)
3. Lambadi (5.05%)
4. Kannada (3.76%)
5. Hindi (1.74%)
6. Marathi (1.32%)
7. Others (1.43%)

At the time of the 2011 census, 71.24% of the population spoke Telugu, 15.46% Urdu, 5.05% Lambadi, 3.76% Kannada, 1.74% Hindi and 1.32% Marathi as their first language.

== Administrative divisions ==
The district has four revenue divisions of Narayankhed, Sangareddy, Zaheerabad, Andole–Jogipet which are sub-divided into 28 mandals.Sri Prateek Jain, I.A.S is the present collector of the district.

=== Mandals ===
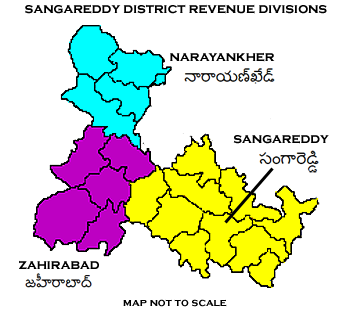
Sangareddy District Revenue divisions

S.No.	Sangareddy revenue division	Narayankhed revenue division	Zaheerabad revenue division	Andole-Jogipet
1	Ameenpur	Kalher	Jharasangam	Andole
2	Gummadidala	Manoor	Mogudampally	Pulkal
3	Hathnoora	Nagilgidda	Nyalkal	Chowtakur
4	Jinnaram	Narayankhed	Raikode	Vatpally
5	Kandi	Sirgapoor	Zahirabad	
6	Kondapur	Nizampet	Kohir	
7	Munipally	Kangti		
8	Patancheru	Tadkal		
9	Ramachandrapuram			
10	Sadasivpet			
11	Sangareddy			

== See also ==
- List of districts in Telangana
