= 2018 Telangana Legislative Assembly election =

2nd Telangana Legislative Assembly election

- 7 December 2018

All 119 seats in the Telangana Legislative Assembly 60 seats needed for a majority
- Registered: 28,075,912
- Turnout: 20,701,783 (73.74%)
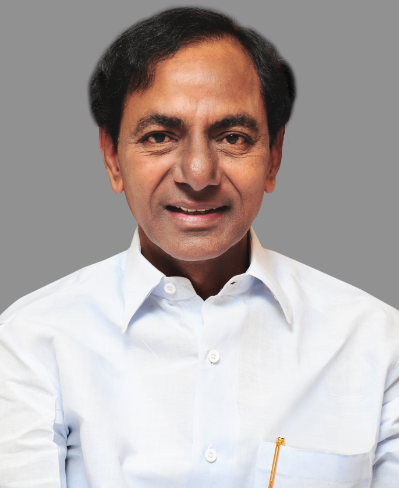

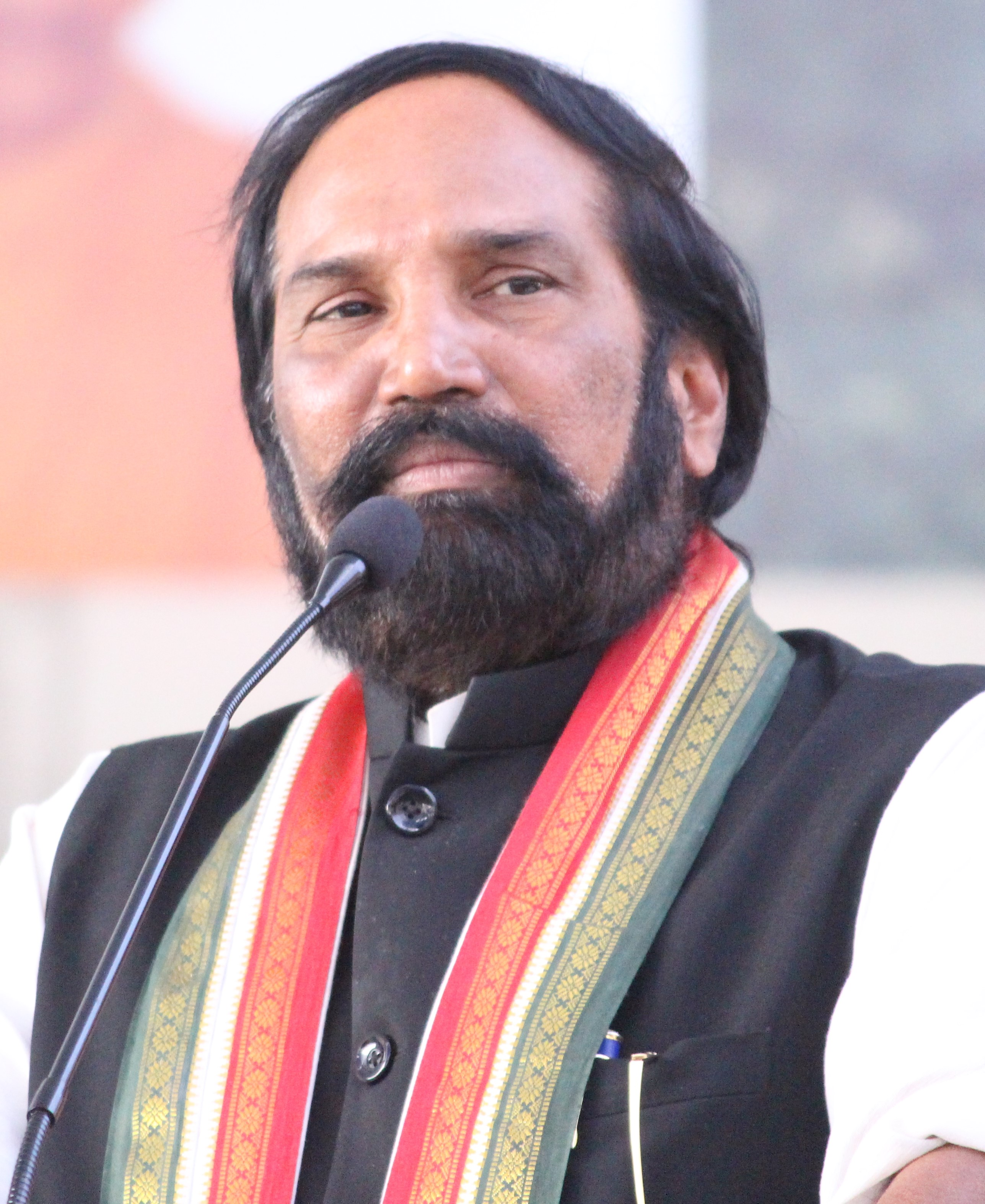

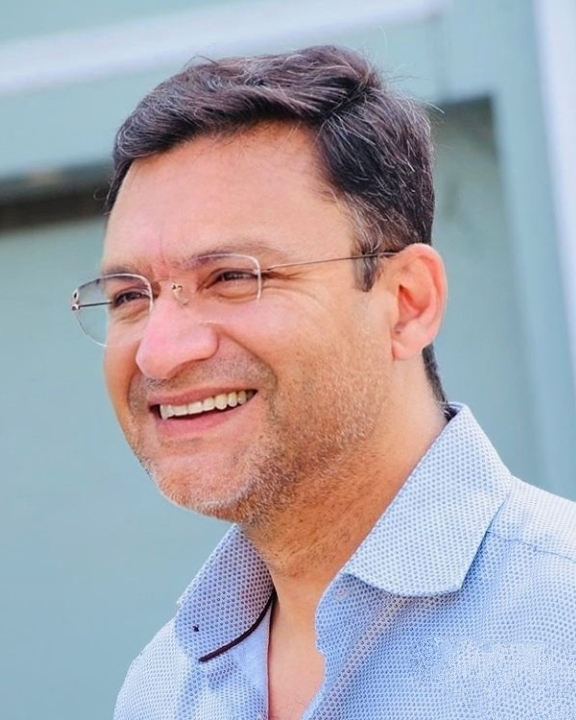

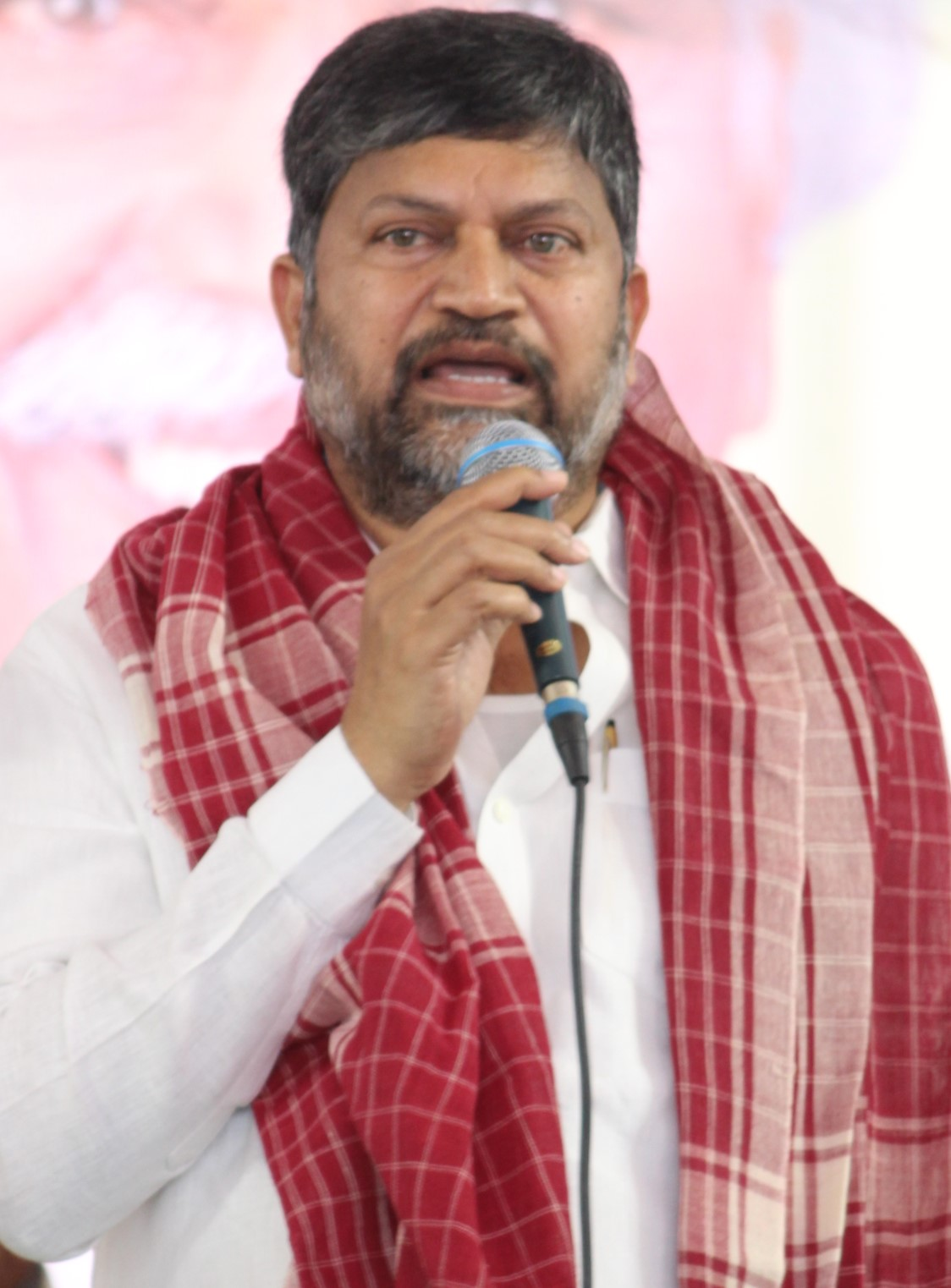

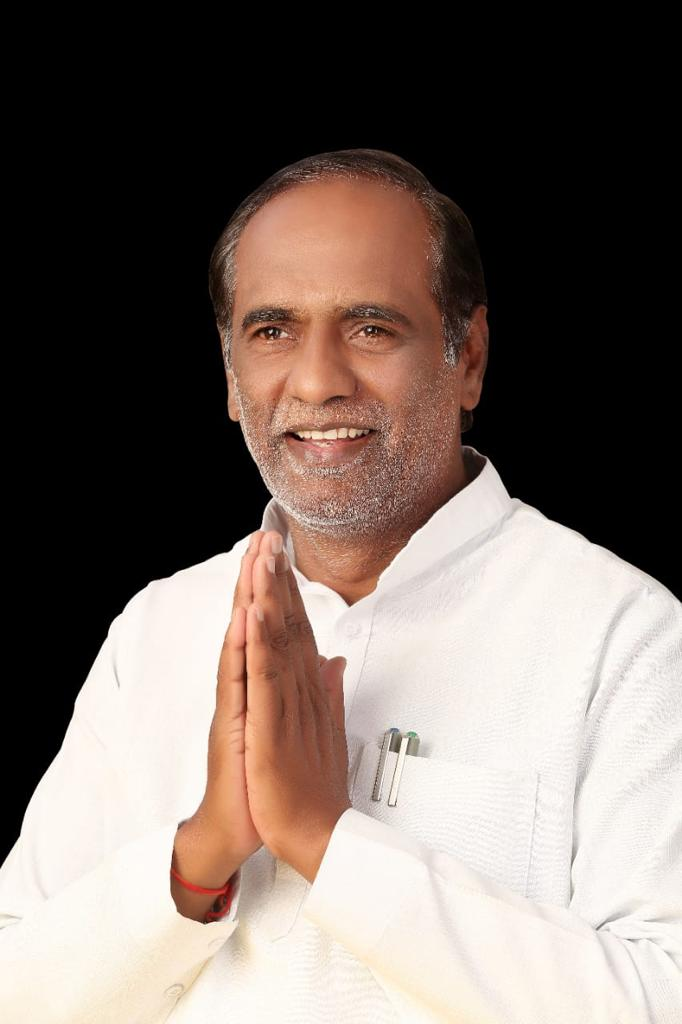
	Majority party	Minority party	Third party
Leader	K. Chandrashekar Rao	N. Uttam Kumar Reddy	Akbaruddin Owaisi
Party	TRS	INC	AIMIM
Alliance	-	Praja Kutami	-
Leader since	2001	2015	1999
Leader's seat	Gajwel (won)	Huzurnagar (won)	Chandrayangutta (won)
Last election	63 seats, 34.30%	21 seats, 25.20%	7 seats, 3.8%
Seats won	88	19	7
Seat change	▲25	▼2	No change
Popular vote	9,700,479	5,883,111	561,089
Percentage	46.87%	28.43%	2.71%
Swing	▲12.60%	▲3.20%	▼1.10%
	Fourth party	Fifth party
Leader	L. Ramana	K. Laxman
Party	TDP	BJP
Alliance	Praja Kutami	NDA
Leader since	2015	2014
Leader's seat	Did not contest	Musheerabad (lost)
Last election	15 seats, 14.70%	5 seats, 7.10%
Seats won	2	1
Seat change	▼13	▼4
Popular vote	725,845	1,450,456
Percentage	3.51%	6.98%
Swing	▼11.20%	▼0.12%
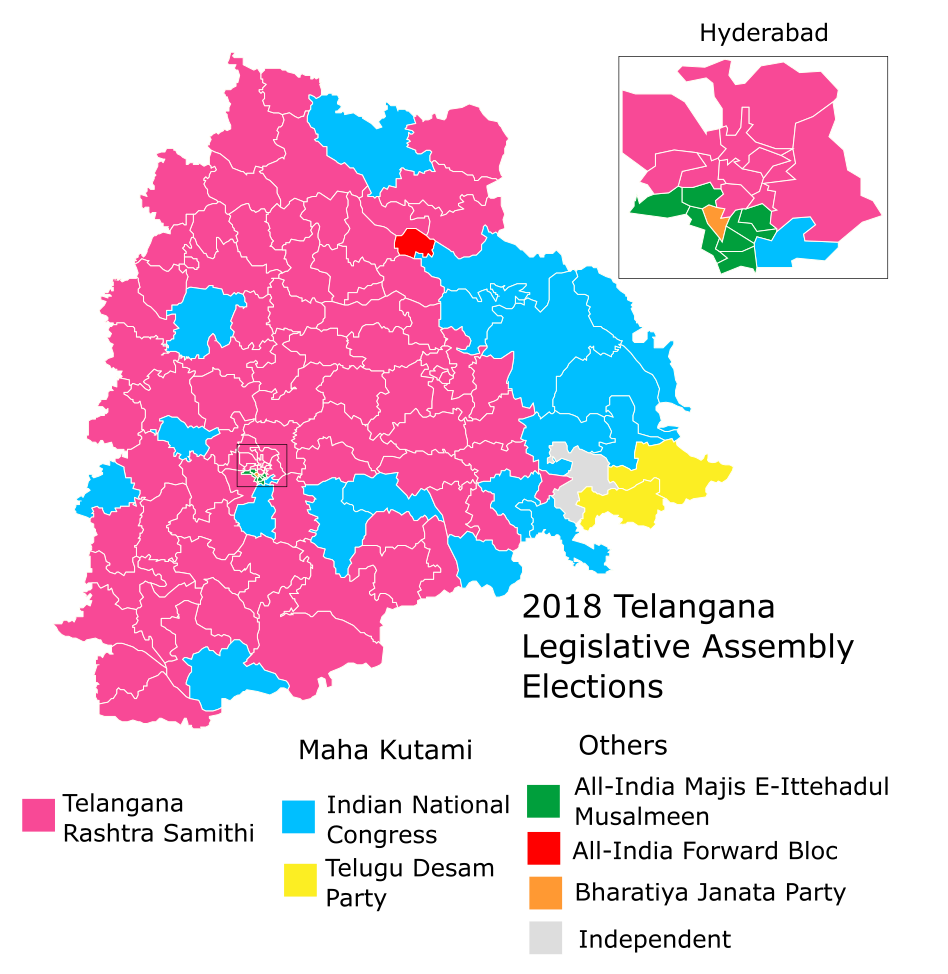
Chief Minister before election
K. Chandrasekhar Rao
TRS
Chief Minister after election
K. Chandrasekhar Rao
TRS

The 2018 Telangana Legislative Assembly election was held on 7 December 2018 which marked the second electoral event since the state's formation in 2014. Key contenders included the Telangana Rashtra Samithi (TRS), Indian National Congress (INC), Bharatiya Janata Party (BJP) and Telugu Desam Party (TDP).

A noteworthy development in the electoral landscape was the formation of the Praja Kutami (People's Alliance), comprising opposition parties such as INC, TDP, CPI and TJS. Despite their collective efforts, they were restricted to 21 seats. The election ultimately reaffirmed the political dominance of TRS, led by K. Chandrashekar Rao, as they secured victory with 88 seats and continued to govern the state of Telangana.

== Background ==
The chief minister K. Chandrashekar Rao called for an early election, when he resigned on 6 September 2018, nine months before the completion of his term.

Since no other party had a majority, the house was dissolved by the governor and Assembly elections were announced.

This election led to the alliance of TDP and INC, once arch rivals, coming together as part of Praja Kutami for the first time.

=== Electoral process changes ===
Election Commission of India announced that Voter-verified paper audit trail (VVPAT) machines will be used in all 32,574 polling stations in the assembly elections in Telangana. According to the final electoral rolls published on 12 October 2018, Telangana has 2,80,64,680 voters, which is less than 2,81,65,885 voters in 2014 Telangana assembly elections. There were around 2,600+ transgender people in the voters list.

Final voters list for Telangana Legislative Assembly election, 2018
S.No	Group of voters	Voters population
1	Male	1.38 crore
2	Female	1.35 crore
3	Transgender	5,560
-	Total voters	2,80,64,680

== Schedule ==
The date of the election was 7 December 2018 and the result were to be out on 11 December 2018.

Poll event	Date
Start of nomination	12 November 2018
Last date for filing nomination	19 November 2018
Scrutiny of nomination	20 November 2018
Last date for withdrawal of nomination	22 November 2018
Date of poll	7 December 2018
Date of counting of votes	11 December 2018
Date of the election being completed	13 December 2018

== Parties and alliances ==
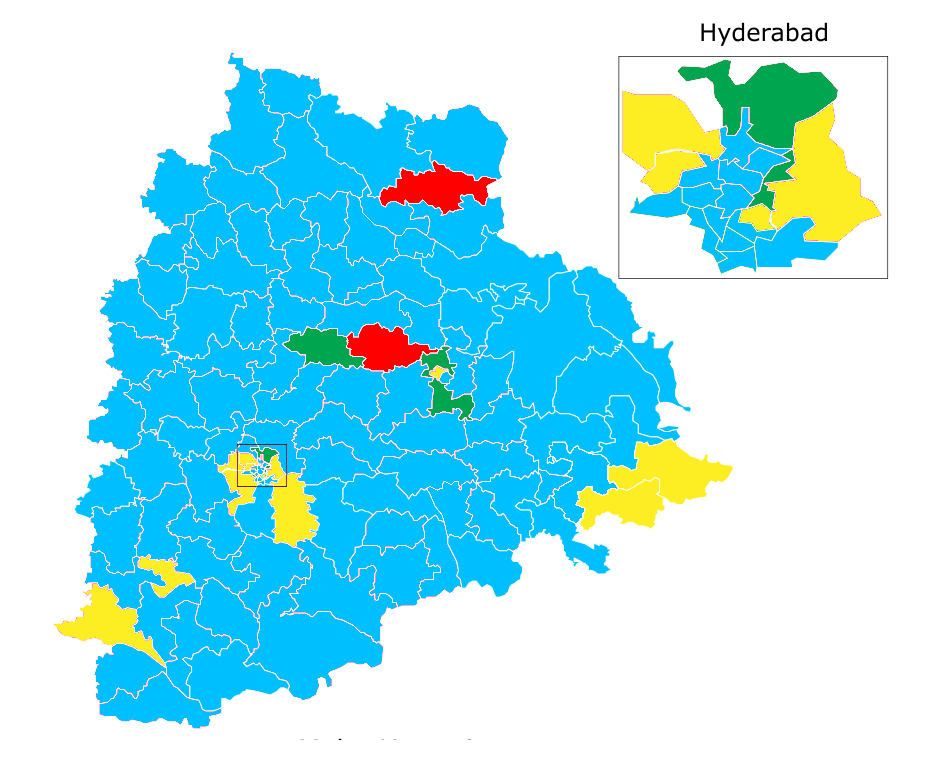
Seat sharing agreement between the constituent parties of Praja Kutami

Alliance/Party		Flag	Symbol	Leader	Seats contested	
Telangana Rashtra Samithi				K. Chandrashekhar Rao	119	
Praja Kutami	Indian National Congress			N. Uttam Kumar Reddy	95+4 (Note: Friendly contest between Indian National Congress and Telangana Jana Samithi in following four Assembly constituencies (ACs) namely: Asifabad (ST) – (AC 5), Khanapur (ST) – (AC 6), Dubbak – (AC 41) and Warangal East – (AC 106).)	115+4
Praja Kutami	Telugu Desam Party			L. Ramana	13	115+4
Praja Kutami	Telangana Jana Samithi			M. Kodandaram	4+4	115+4
Praja Kutami	Communist Party of India			Chada Venkat Reddy	3	115+4
Bharatiya Janata Party				K. Laxman	118	
Bahujan Samaj Party			BSP elephant	Mayawati	106	
Communist Party of India (Marxist)				Tammineni Veerabhadram	26	
All India Majlis-e-Ittehadul Muslimeen				Akbaruddin Owaisi	8	

== Candidates ==
District	Constituency		TRS		Praja Kutami		BJP	
District	#	Name	Party	Candidate	Party	Candidate	Party	Candidate
Adilabad	1	Sirpur	TRS	Koneru Konappa	INC	Palvai Harish Babu	BJP	Kottapelli Srinivas
Adilabad	2	Chennur (SC)	TRS	Balka Suman	INC	Venkatesh Netha Borlakunta	BJP	Srinivas Andugula
Adilabad	3	Bellampalli (SC)	TRS	Durgam Chinnaiah	CPI	Gunda Mallesh	BJP	Koyyala Emaji
Adilabad	4	Mancherial	TRS	Nadipelli Diwakar Rao	INC	Kokkirala Premsagar Rao	BJP	Raghunath Verabelli
Adilabad	5	Asifabad (ST)	TRS	Kova Laxmi	INC	Atram Sakku	BJP	Azmera Athma Rao
Adilabad	5	Asifabad (ST)	TRS	Kova Laxmi	TJS	Kotnaka Vijay Kumar	BJP	Azmera Athma Rao
Adilabad	6	Khanapur (ST)	TRS	Ajmeera Rekha	INC	Ramesh Rathod	BJP	Ashok Satla
Adilabad	6	Khanapur (ST)	TRS	Ajmeera Rekha	TJS	Thatra Bheem Rao	BJP	Ashok Satla
Adilabad	7	Adilabad	TRS	Jogu Ramanna	INC	Gandrath Sujatha	BJP	Payal Shankar
Adilabad	8	Boath (ST)	TRS	Rathod Bapu Rao	INC	Soyam Bapu Rao	BJP	Madavi Raju
Adilabad	9	Nirmal	TRS	Allola Indrakaran Reddy	INC	Alleti Maheshwar Reddy	BJP	Aindla Swarna Reddy
Adilabad	10	Mudhole	TRS	Gaddigari Vittal Reddy	INC	Rama Rao Pawar	BJP	Padakanti Ramadevi
Nizamabad	11	Armur	TRS	Asannagari Jeevan Reddy	INC	Akula Lalitha	BJP	Vinay Kumar Reddy Prodduturi
Nizamabad	12	Bodhan	TRS	Shakil Aamir Mohammed	INC	P. Sudarshan Reddy	BJP	Srinivas Aljapur
Nizamabad	13	Jukkal (SC)	TRS	Hanmanth Shinde	INC	Gangaram Soudagar	BJP	T. Aruna Thara
Nizamabad	14	Banswada	TRS	Pocharam Srinivas Reddy	INC	Kasula Balaraju	BJP	Prakash Naidu
Nizamabad	15	Yellareddy	TRS	Eanugu Ravinder Reddy	INC	Jajala Surender	BJP	Banala Laxma Reddy
Nizamabad	16	Kamareddy	TRS	Gampa Govardhan	INC	Mohammed Ali Shabbir	BJP	K. V. Ramana Reddy
Nizamabad	17	Nizamabad (Urban)	TRS	Bigala Ganesh	INC	Taher Bin Hamdan	BJP	Endela Lakshminarayana
Nizamabad	18	Nizamabad (Rural)	TRS	Bajireddy Goverdhan	INC	Rekulapally Bhoopathi Reddy	BJP	Anand Reddy Gaddam
Nizamabad	19	Balkonda	TRS	Vemula Prashanth Reddy	INC	Anil Kumar Eravathri	BJP	Ruyyadi Rajeshwar
Karimnagar	20	Koratla	TRS	Kalvakuntla Vidya Sagar Rao	INC	Juvvadi Narsinga Rao	BJP	J. N. Venkat
Karimnagar	21	Jagtial	TRS	M. Sanjay Kumar	INC	T. Jeevan Reddy	BJP	Ravinder Reddy Muduganti
Karimnagar	22	Dharmapuri (SC)	TRS	Koppula Eshwar	INC	Adluri Laxman Kumar	BJP	Anjaiah Kannam
Karimnagar	23	Ramagundam	TRS	Somarapu Satyanarayana	INC	Makkan Singh Raj Thakur	BJP	Vanitha Balmuri
Karimnagar	24	Manthani	TRS	Putta Madhukar	INC	D. Sridhar Babu	BJP	Rendla Sanath Kumar
Karimnagar	25	Peddapalle	TRS	Dasari Manohar Reddy	INC	Chinthakunta Vijaya Ramana Rao	BJP	Gujjula Ramakrishna Reddy
Karimnagar	26	Karimnagar	TRS	Gangula Kamalakar	INC	Ponnam Prabhakar	BJP	Bandi Sanjay Kumar
Karimnagar	27	Choppadandi (SC)	TRS	Sunke Ravi Shankar	INC	Medipally Sathyam	BJP	Bodige Shobha
Karimnagar	28	Vemulawada	TRS	Chennamaneni Ramesh	INC	Aadi Srinivas	BJP	Pratapa Ramakrishan
Karimnagar	29	Sircilla	TRS	K. T. Rama Rao	INC	Kondam Karuna Mahender Reddy	BJP	Mallugari Narsa Goud
Karimnagar	30	Manakondur (SC)	TRS	Rasamayi Balakishan	INC	Arepally Mohan	BJP	Gaddam Nagaraju
Karimnagar	31	Huzurabad	TRS	Etela Rajender	INC	Kaushik Reddy	BJP	Raghu Puppala
Karimnagar	32	Husnabad	TRS	Vodithela Sathish Kumar	CPI	Chada Venkat Reddy	BJP	Srinivasa Chada Reddy
Medak	33	Siddipet	TRS	T. Harish Rao	TJS	Marikanti Bhavani	BJP	Naini Narotham Reddy
Medak	34	Medak	TRS	Padma Devender Reddy	INC	Ammareddy Gari Upender Reddy	Did not contest	
Medak	35	Narayankhed	TRS	Mahareddy Bhupal Reddy	INC	Shetkar Suresh Kumar	BJP	Patlolla Sanjeeva Reddy
Medak	36	Andole (SC)	TRS	Chanti Kranthi Kiran	INC	Damodar Raja Narasimha	BJP	Babu Mohan
Medak	37	Narsapur	TRS	Chilumula Madan Reddy	INC	Vakiti Sunitha Laxma Reddy	BJP	Gopi Singayapalli
Medak	38	Zahirabad (SC)	TRS	Koninty Manik Rao	INC	J. Geeta Reddy	BJP	Gopi Jangam
Medak	39	Sangareddy	TRS	Chinta Prabhakar	INC	Jagga Reddy	BJP	Rajeshwar Deshpande Rao
Medak	40	Patancheru	TRS	Gudem Mahipal Reddy	INC	Kata Srinivas Goud	BJP	P. Karunakar Reddy
Medak	41	Dubbak	TRS	Solipeta Ramalinga Reddy	INC	Maddula Nageshwar Reddy	BJP	Raghunandan Rao
Medak	41	Dubbak	TRS	Solipeta Ramalinga Reddy	TJS	Chindam Rajkumar	BJP	Raghunandan Rao
Medak	42	Gajwel	TRS	K. Chandrashekar Rao	INC	Vanteru Pratap Reddy	BJP	Vijaya Akula
Ranga Reddy	43	Medchal	TRS	Malla Reddy	INC	Kicchannagari Laxma Reddy	BJP	Peddi Mohan Reddy
Ranga Reddy	44	Malkajgiri	TRS	Mynampally Hanumanth Rao	TJS	Kapilavai Dileep Kumar	BJP	N. Ramchander Rao
Ranga Reddy	45	Quthbullapur	TRS	K. P. Vivekanand Goud	INC	Kuna Srisailam Goud	BJP	Kasani Veeresh
Ranga Reddy	46	Kukatpally	TRS	Madhavaram Krishna Rao	TDP	Nandamuri Venkata Suhasini	BJP	Madhavaram Kantha Rao
Ranga Reddy	47	Uppal	TRS	Bethi Subhas Reddy	TDP	Tulla Veerender Goud	BJP	N. V. S. S. Prabhakar
Ranga Reddy	48	Ibrahimpatnam	TRS	Manchireddy Kishan Reddy	TDP	Sama Ranga Reddy	BJP	Kotha Ashok
Ranga Reddy	49	Lal Bahadur Nagar	TRS	Mudda Gowni Ram Mohan Goud	INC	Devireddy Sudheer Reddy	BJP	Perala Shekhar Rao
Ranga Reddy	50	Maheshwaram	TRS	Teegala Krishna Reddy	INC	Sabitha Indra Reddy	BJP	Andela Sriramulu
Ranga Reddy	51	Rajendranagar	TRS	T. Prakash Goud	TDP	Ganesh Renukuntla	BJP	Baddam Bal Reddy
Ranga Reddy	52	Serilingampally	TRS	Arekapudi Gandhi	TDP	V. Ananda Prasad	BJP	Gajjala Yoganand
Ranga Reddy	53	Chevella (SC)	TRS	Kale Yadaiah	INC	K. S. Ratnam	BJP	Kanjarla Prakash
Ranga Reddy	54	Pargi	TRS	Koppula Mahesh Reddy	INC	T. Ram Mohan Reddy	BJP	K. Prahalad Rao
Ranga Reddy	55	Vikarabad (SC)	TRS	Methuku Anand	INC	Gaddam Prasad Kumar	BJP	Raipally Sai Krishna
Ranga Reddy	56	Tandur	TRS	P. Mahender Reddy	INC	Pilot Rohith Reddy	BJP	Patel Ravishanker
Hyderabad	57	Musheerabad	TRS	Muta Gopal	INC	M. Anil Kumar Yadav	BJP	K. Laxman
Hyderabad	58	Malakpet	TRS	C. Satish Kumar	TDP	Mohammed Muzaffar Ali Khan	BJP	Ale Jeetendra
Hyderabad	59	Amberpet	TRS	Kaleru Venkatesh	TJS	Nijjana Ramesh	BJP	G. Kishan Reddy
Hyderabad	60	Khairatabad	TRS	Danam Nagender	INC	Dasoju Sravan Kumar	BJP	Chintala Ramachandra Reddy
Hyderabad	61	Jubilee Hills	TRS	Maganti Gopinath	INC	P. Vishnuvardhan Reddy	BJP	Ravula Sridhar Reddy
Hyderabad	62	Sanath Nagar	TRS	Talasani Srinivas Yadav	TDP	Kuna Venkatesh Goud	BJP	Bhawarlal Varma
Hyderabad	63	Nampalli	TRS	Ch. Anand Kumar Goud	INC	Mohammed Feroz Khan	BJP	Devara Karunakar
Hyderabad	64	Karwan	TRS	T. Jeevan Singh	INC	Osman Bin Mohammed Al Hajri	BJP	Amar Singh
Hyderabad	65	Goshamahal	TRS	Prem Singh Rathore	INC	Mukesh Goud	BJP	T. Raja Singh
Hyderabad	66	Charminar	TRS	Mohammed Salahuddin Lodhi	INC	Mohammed Ghouse	BJP	T. Uma Mahendra
Hyderabad	67	Chandrayangutta	TRS	M. Seetha Ram Reddy	INC	Esa Misri	BJP	Shahejadi Sayyad
Hyderabad	68	Yakutpura	TRS	Sama Sunder Reddy	INC	K. Rajender Raju	BJP	Ch. Roopraj
Hyderabad	69	Bahadurpura	TRS	Mir Inayath Ali Baqri	INC	Shaik Mohd Kaleemuddin	BJP	Haneef Ali
Hyderabad	70	Secunderabad	TRS	T. Padma Rao Goud	INC	Kasani Gnaneshwar Mudiraj	BJP	Bandapelly Satish
Hyderabad	71	Secunderabad Cantt. (SC)	TRS	G. Sayanna	INC	Sarve Satyanarayana	BJP	Sri Ganesh
Mahabubnagar	72	Kodangal	TRS	Patnam Narender Reddy	INC	Revanth Reddy	BJP	Nagurao Namaji
Mahabubnagar	73	Narayanpet	TRS	S. Rajender Reddy	INC	Krishna Saraf Bangaru Balappa	BJP	K. Rathanga Pandu Reddy
Mahabubnagar	74	Mahbubnagar	TRS	V. Srinivas Goud	TDP	M. Chandra Shekar	BJP	G. Padmaja Reddy
Mahabubnagar	75	Jadcherla	TRS	C. Laxma Reddy	INC	Mallu Ravi	BJP	Dr. Chinnala Madhusudhan
Mahabubnagar	76	Devarkadra	TRS	Alla Venkateshwar Reddy	INC	Pavan Kumar	BJP	Aggani Narsimulu
Mahabubnagar	77	Makthal	TRS	Chittem Rammohan Reddy	TDP	K. Dhayyakkaar Reddy	BJP	Kondaiah
Mahabubnagar	78	Wanaparthy	TRS	Singireddy Niranjan Reddy	INC	G. Chinna Reddy	BJP	Kotha Amarendar Reddy
Mahabubnagar	79	Gadwal	TRS	Bandla Krishna Mohan Reddy	INC	D. K. Aruna	BJP	G. Venkatadri Reddy
Mahabubnagar	80	Alampur (SC)	TRS	V. M. Abraham	INC	S. A. Sampath Kumar	BJP	B. Rajini
Mahabubnagar	81	Nagarkurnool	TRS	Marri Janardhan Reddy	INC	Nagam Janardhan Reddy	BJP	Dileep Neddanori
Mahabubnagar	82	Achampet (SC)	TRS	Guvvala Balaraju	INC	Chikkudu Vamshi Krishna	BJP	Medipur Malleshwar
Mahabubnagar	83	Kalwakurthy	TRS	Gurka Jaipal Yadav	INC	Challa Vamshi Chand Reddy	BJP	Achary Talloj
Mahabubnagar	84	Shadnagar	TRS	Yelganamoni Anjaiah Yadav	INC	Chowlapally Pratap Reddy	BJP	Nelli Sreevardhan Reddy
Mahabubnagar	85	Kollapur	TRS	Jupally Krishna Rao	INC	Beeram Harshavardhan Reddy	BJP	Aelleni Sudhakar Rao
Nalgonda	86	Devarakonda (ST)	TRS	Ramavath Ravindra Kumar	INC	Balu Naik	BJP	Gopi @ Kalyan Naik
Nalgonda	87	Nagarjuna Sagar	TRS	Nomula Narsimhaiah Yadav	INC	Kunduru Jana Reddy	BJP	Kankanala Nivedita
Nalgonda	88	Miryalguda	TRS	Nallamothu Bhaskar Rao	INC	R. Krishnaiah	BJP	Karnati Prabhakar
Nalgonda	89	Huzurnagar	TRS	Shanampudi Saidireddy	INC	N. Uttam Kumar Reddy	BJP	Bobba Bhagya Reddy
Nalgonda	90	Kodad	TRS	Bollam Mallaiah Yadav	INC	N. Padmavathi Reddy	BJP	Jallepalli Enkateshwarulu
Nalgonda	91	Suryapet	TRS	Guntakandla Jagadish Reddy	INC	Ramreddy Damodar Reddy	BJP	Sankineni Venkateswar Rao
Nalgonda	92	Nalgonda	TRS	Kancharla Bhupal Reddy	INC	Komatireddy Venkat Reddy	BJP	Sriramoju Shanmukha Chary
Nalgonda	93	Munugode	TRS	Kusukuntla Prabhakar Reddy	INC	Komatireddy Raj Gopal Reddy	BJP	Gangidi Manohar Reddy
Nalgonda	94	Bhongir	TRS	Pailla Shekar Reddy	INC	Kumbam Anil Kumar Reddy	Did not contest	
Nalgonda	95	Nakrekal (SC)	TRS	Vemula Veeresham	INC	Chirumarthi Lingaiah	BJP	Kasarla Lingaiah
Nalgonda	96	Thungathurthy (SC)	TRS	Gadari Kishore	INC	Addanki Dayakar	BJP	Ramachandraiah Kadiyam
Nalgonda	97	Alair	TRS	Gongidi Suntiha	INC	Budida Bikshamaiah Goud	BJP	Donthiri Sridhar Reddy
Warangal	98	Jangoan	TRS	Muthireddy Yadagiri Reddy	INC	Ponnala Lakshmaiah	BJP	K. V. L. N. Reddy (Raju)
Warangal	99	Ghanpur Station (SC)	TRS	T. Rajaiah	INC	Singapuram Indira	BJP	Perumandla Venkateshwarulu
Warangal	100	Palakurthi	TRS	Errabelli Dayakar Rao	INC	Janga Ragava Reddy	BJP	Somaiah Pedagani
Warangal	101	Dornakal (ST)	TRS	Dharamsoth Redya Naik	INC	Jatoth Ram Chander Naik	BJP	Gugulothu Laxman Naik
Warangal	102	Mahabubabad (ST)	TRS	Banoth Shankar Nayak	INC	Balram Naik	BJP	Jatothu Hussain
Warangal	103	Narsampet	TRS	Peddi Sudarshan Reddy	INC	Donthi Madhava Reddy	BJP	Ashok Reddy Edla
Warangal	104	Parkal	TRS	Challa Dharma Reddy	INC	Konda Surekha	BJP	Dr. Pesaru Vijaya Chander Reddy
Warangal	105	Warangal West	TRS	Dasyam Vinay Bhasker	TDP	Revuri Prakash Reddy	BJP	Dharmarao Marthineni
Warangal	106	Warangal East	TRS	Nannapuneni Narender	INC	Vaddiraju Ravichandra	BJP	Satish Kusuma
Warangal	106	Warangal East	TRS	Nannapuneni Narender	TJS	Inna Reddy Gade	BJP	Satish Kusuma
Warangal	107	Wardhanapet (SC)	TRS	Aroori Ramesh	TJS	Devaiah Pagidipati	BJP	Kotha Saranga Rao
Warangal	108	Bhupalpalle	TRS	S. Madhusudhana Chary	INC	Gandra Venkata Ramana Reddy	BJP	Chandupatla Keerthi Reddy
Warangal	109	Mulug (ST)	TRS	Azmeera Chandulal	INC	Seethakka	BJP	Banoth Devilal
Khammam	110	Pinapaka (ST)	TRS	Payam Venkateswarlu	INC	Rega Kantha Rao	BJP	Santosh Kumar Chanda
Khammam	111	Yellandu (ST)	TRS	Koram Kanakaiah	INC	Haripriya Banoth	BJP	Naaga Sravanthi Mokalla
Khammam	112	Khammam	TRS	Puvvada Ajay Kumar	TDP	Nama Nageswara Rao	BJP	Sarada Vuppala
Khammam	113	Palair	TRS	Thummala Nageswara Rao	INC	Kandala Upender Reddy	BJP	Sridhar Kondapalli Reddy
Khammam	114	Madhira (SC)	TRS	Lingala Kamal Raju	INC	Mallu Bhatti Vikramarka	BJP	Shyamala Kathula Rao
Khammam	115	Wyra (ST)	TRS	Banoth Madanlal	CPI	Vijaya Banoth	BJP	Reshma Bai Bhukya
Khammam	116	Sathupalli (SC)	TRS	Pidamarthi Ravi	TDP	Sandra Venkata Veeraiah	BJP	Namburi Ramalingeswara Rao
Khammam	117	Kothagudem	TRS	Jalagam Venkat Rao	INC	Vanama Venkateswara Rao	BJP	Byreddy Prabhakar Reddy
Khammam	118	Aswaraopeta (ST)	TRS	Thati Venkateswarlu	TDP	Mecha Nageswara Rao	BJP	Bhukya Prasada Rao
Khammam	119	Bhadrachalam (ST)	TRS	Tellam Venkata Rao	INC	Podem Veeraiah	BJP	Kunja Satyavathi

== Results ==
=== Vote share ===
Vote share by party
1. Telangana Rashtra Samithi (46.9%)
2. Indian National Congress (28.4%)
3. Bharatiya Janata Party (6.98%)
4. Telugu Desam Party (3.51%)
5. All India Majlis-e-Ittehadul Muslimeen (2.71%)
6. Others (11.5%)

=== Seat share ===
Seat share by party
1. Telangana Rashtra Samithi (73.9%)
2. Indian National Congress (16.0%)
3. All India Majlis-e-Ittehadul Muslimeen (5.88%)
4. Telugu Desam Party (1.68%)
5. Bharatiya Janata Party (0.84%)
6. Others (1.68%)

=== Results by party ===
Source: Election Commission of India
Alliance/Party		Popular vote			Seats		
Alliance/Party		Votes	%	±pp	Contested	Won	+/−
Telangana Rashtra Samithi		9,700,948	46.87	▲12.57	119	88	▲25
Praja Kutami	Indian National Congress	5,883,088	28.43	▲3.23	95 + 4	19	▼2
Praja Kutami	Telugu Desam Party	725,714	3.51	▼11.19	13	2	▼13
Praja Kutami	Telangana Jana Samithi	95,364	0.46	new	4 + 4	0	new
Praja Kutami	Communist Party of India	83,215	0.40	▼0.50	3	0	▼1
Praja Kutami	Total	6,787,381	32.80	N/A	115 + 8	21	N/A
Bharatiya Janata Party		1,443,799	6.98	▼0.12	118	1	▼4
All India Majlis-e-Ittehadul Muslimeen		561,091	2.71	▼1.09	8	7	Steady
Other parties		1,303,939	6.30	N/A	782	1	N/A
Independents		673,609	3.25	▼1.75	675	1	Steady
NOTA		224,661	1.09	▲0.29			
Total		20,695,428	100.00	N/A	1,821	119	N/A
Vote statistics
Valid votes		20,695,428	99.97				
Invalid votes		6,355	0.03				
Votes cast/Turnout		20,701,783	73.74				
Abstentions		7,374,129	26.26				
Registered voters		28,075,912					

==== Results by district ====
District	Seats						
District	Seats	TRS	INC	TDP	MIM	BJP	OTH
Adilabad	10	9	1	—N/a	—N/a	—N/a	—N/a
Nizamabad	9	8	1	—N/a	—N/a	—N/a	—N/a
Karimnagar	13	11	1	—N/a	—N/a	—N/a	1
Medak	10	9	1	—N/a	—N/a	—N/a	—N/a
Ranga Reddy	14	11	3	—N/a	—N/a	—N/a	—N/a
Hyderabad	15	7	—N/a	—N/a	7	1	—N/a
Mahbubnagar	14	13	1	—N/a	—N/a	—N/a	—N/a
Nalgonda	12	9	3	—N/a	—N/a	—N/a	—N/a
Warangal	12	10	2	—N/a	—N/a	—N/a	—N/a
Khammam	10	1	6	2	—N/a	—N/a	1
Total	119	88	19	2	7	1	2

==== Results by Vote Percentage ====
District	Seats										
District	Seats	TRS		Praja Kutami		BJP		AIMIM		Others	
District	Seats	Seats	Vote (%)	Seats	Vote (%)	Seats	Vote (%)	Seats	Vote (%)	Seats	Vote (%)
Adilabad	10	9	45.21%	1	31.03%	0	9.86%	0	0.00%	0	13.90%
Nizamabad	9	8	46.97%	1	35.66%	0	8.21%	0	0.00%	0	9.16%
Karimnagar	13	11	51.33%	1	31.58%	0	6.32%	0	0.00%	1	10.77%
Medak	10	9	56.52%	1	31.00%	0	6.25%	0	0.00%	0	6.23%
Ranga Reddy	14	11	47.60%	3	32.25%	0	8.24%	0	1.49%	0	10.42%
Hyderabad	15	7	31.55%	0	18.88%	1	18.19%	7	25.42%	0	5.96%
Mahbubnagar	14	13	50.46%	1	30.70%	0	6.22%	0	0.00%	0	12.62%
Nalgonda	12	9	45.73%	3	40.07%	0	3.34%	0	0.00%	0	10.86%
Warangal	12	10	50.59%	2	35.05%	0	2.63%	0	0.00%	0	11.73%
Khammam	10	1	40.62%	8	43.80%	0	0.95%	0	0.00%	1	14.63%
Total	119	88	46.87%	21	32.80%	1	7.01%	7	2.71%	2	10.61%

=== Results by constituency ===
District	Constituency		Winner				Runner Up				Margin
District	No.	Name	Candidate	Party	Votes	%	Candidate	Party	Votes	%	Margin
Adilabad	1	Sirpur	Koneru Konappa	TRS	83,088	50.57	Palvai Harish Babu	INC	59,052	35.94	24,036
Adilabad	2	Chennur (SC)	Balka Suman	TRS	71,980	53.06	Venkatesh Netha Borlakunta	INC	43,848	32.32	28,132
Adilabad	3	Bellampalli (SC)	Durgam Chinnaiah	TRS	55,026	43.16	Gaddam Vinod	BSP	43,750	34.31	11,276
Adilabad	4	Mancherial	Diwakar Rao Nadipelli	TRS	75,360	45.20	Kokkirala Premsagar Rao	INC	70,512	42.29	4,848
Adilabad	5	Asifabad (ST)	Atram Sakku	INC	65,788	40.92	Kova Laxmi	TRS	65,617	40.81	171
Adilabad	6	Khanapur (ST)	Ajmeera Rekha	TRS	67,138	44.12	Ramesh Rathod	INC	46,428	30.51	20,710
Adilabad	7	Adilabad	Jogu Ramanna	TRS	74,050	44.66	Payal Shankar	BJP	47,444	28.62	26,606
Adilabad	8	Boath (ST)	Rathod Bapu Rao	TRS	61,125	38.99	Soyam Bapu Rao	INC	54,639	34.85	6,486
Adilabad	9	Nirmal	Allola Indrakaran Reddy	TRS	79,985	46.21	Alleti Maheshwar Reddy	INC	70,714	40.86	9,271
Adilabad	10	Mudhole	Gaddigari Vittal Reddy	TRS	83,933	45.68	Padakanti Ramadevi	BJP	40,602	22.01	43,331
Nizamabad	11	Armur	Asannagari Jeevan Reddy	TRS	72,125	51.37	Akula Lalitha	INC	43,330	30.86	28,795
Nizamabad	12	Bodhan	Shakil Aamir Mohammed	TRS	74,895	47.12	Sudarshan Reddy Podduturi	INC	66,794	42.04	8,101
Nizamabad	13	Jukkal (SC)	Hanmanth Shinde	TRS	77,584	51.20	S. Gangaram	INC	41,959	27.69	35,625
Nizamabad	14	Banswada	Pocharam Srinivas Reddy	TRS	77,943	53.46	Kasula Balaraju	INC	59,458	40.78	18,485
Nizamabad	15	Yellareddy	Jajala Surender	INC	91,510	54.31	Eanugu Ravinder Reddy	TRS	56,362	33.45	35,148
Nizamabad	16	Kamareddy	Gampa Govardhan	TRS	68,167	42.02	Mohammed Ali Shabbir	INC	63,610	39.21	4,557
Nizamabad	17	Nizamabad Urban	Bigala Ganesh	TRS	71,896	47.53	Taher Bin Hamdan	INC	46,055	30.44	25,841
Nizamabad	18	Nizamabad Rural	Bajireddy Goverdhan	TRS	87,976	50.86	Rekulapally Bhoopathi Reddy	INC	58,330	33.72	29,646
Nizamabad	19	Balkonda	Vemula Prashanth Reddy	TRS	73,662	47.57	Sunil Kumar Muthyala	BSP	41,254	26.64	32,408
Karimnagar	20	Koratla	Kalvakuntla Vidya Sagar Rao	TRS	84.605	51.63	Juvvadi Narsinga Rao	INC	53,385	32.58	31,220
Karimnagar	21	Jagtial	M. Sanjay Kumar	TRS	104,247	65.27	Jeevan Reddy Thatiparthi	INC	43,062	26.96	61,185
Karimnagar	22	Dharmapuri (SC)	Koppula Eshwar	TRS	70,579	42.58	Adluri Laxman Kumar	INC	70,138	42.32	441
Karimnagar	23	Ramagundam	Korukanti Chandar	AIFB	61,400	45.10	Somarapu Satyanarayana	TRS	34,981	25.69	26,419
Karimnagar	24	Manthani	Sridhar Babu	INC	89,045	50.41	Putta Madhukar	TRS	72,815	41.22	16,230
Karimnagar	25	Peddapalle	Dasari Manohar Reddy	TRS	82,765	44.33	Chinthakunta Vijaya Ramana Rao	INC	74,299	39.79	8,466
Karimnagar	26	Karimnagar	Gangula Kamalakar	TRS	80,983	40.71	Bandi Sanjay Kumar	BJP	66,009	33.18	14,974
Karimnagar	27	Choppadandi (SC)	Sunke Ravi Shankar	TRS	91,090	53.79	Medipally Sathyam	INC	48,963	28.92	42,127
Karimnagar	28	Vemulawada	Chennamaneni Ramesh	TRS	84,050	54.10	Aadi Srinivas	INC	55,864	35.96	28,186
Karimnagar	29	Sircilla	K. T. Rama Rao	TRS	125,213	70.89	K. K. Mahender Reddy	INC	36,204	20.50	89,009
Karimnagar	30	Manakondur (SC)	Rasamayi Balakishan	TRS	88,997	51.47	Arepalli Mohan	INC	57,488	33.25	31,509
Karimnagar	31	Huzurabad	Etela Rajender	TRS	104,840	59.34	Kaushik Reddy Padi	INC	61,121	34.60	43,719
Karimnagar	32	Husnabad	Vodithela Sathish Kumar	TRS	96,517	62.67	Chada Venkat Reddy	CPI	46,553	24.92	49,964
Medak	33	Siddipet	T. Harish Rao	TRS	131,295	78.59	Bhavani Marikanti	TJS	12,596	7.54	118,699
Medak	34	Medak	Padma Devender Reddy	TRS	97,670	57.84	Ammareddy Gari Upender Reddy	INC	49,687	29.42	47,983
Medak	35	Narayankhed	Mahareddy Bhupal Reddy	TRS	95,550	55.00	Suresh Shetkar	INC	37,042	21.32	58,508
Medak	36	Andole (SC)	Chanti Kranthi Kiran	TRS	104,229	52.61	Damodar Raja Narasimha	INC	87,764	44.30	16,465
Medak	37	Narsapur	Chilumula Madan Reddy	TRS	105,665	57.54	Vakiti Sunitha Laxma Reddy	INC	67,345	36.67	38,320
Medak	38	Zahirabad (SC)	Koninty Manik Rao	TRS	96,598	51.14	J. Geeta Reddy	INC	62,125	32.89	34,473
Medak	39	Sangareddy	Turupu Jayaprakash Reddy	INC	76,572	45.77	Chinta Prabhakar	TRS	73,983	44.22	2,589
Medak	40	Patancheru	Gudem Mahipal Reddy	TRS	116,474	54.41	Kata Srinivas Goud	INC	78,775	36.80	37,699
Medak	41	Dubbak	Solipeta Ramalinga Reddy	TRS	89,299	54.36	Maddula Nageshwar Reddy	INC	26,799	16.31	62,500
Medak	42	Gajwel	K. Chandrashekar Rao	TRS	125,444	60.45	Vanteru Pratap Reddy	INC	67,154	32.36	58,290
Ranga Reddy	43	Medchal	Malla Reddy	TRS	167,324	54.98	Kicchannagari Laxma Reddy	INC	79,334	26.07	87,990
Ranga Reddy	44	Malkajgiri	Mynampally Hanumantha Rao	TRS	114,149	54.49	Naraparaju Ramchander Rao	BJP	40,451	19.31	73,698
Ranga Reddy	45	Quthbullapur	K. P. Vivekanand Goud	TRS	154,500	53.39	Kuna Srisailam Goud	INC	113,000	39.05	41,500
Ranga Reddy	46	Kukatpally	Madhavaram Krishna Rao	TRS	111,612	51.78	Nandamuri Venkata Suhasini	TDP	70,563	32.74	41,049
Ranga Reddy	47	Uppal	Bethi Subhas Reddy	TRS	117,442	51.53	Tulla Veerender Goud	TDP	69,274	30.40	48,168
Ranga Reddy	48	Ibrahimpatnam	Manchireddy Kishan Reddy	TRS	72,581	36.87	Malreddy Ranga Reddy	BSP	72,205	36.68	376
Ranga Reddy	49	L. B. Nagar	Devireddy Sudheer Reddy	INC	113,980	46.66	Muddagowni Ram Mohan Goud	TRS	96,132	39.33	17,848
Ranga Reddy	50	Maheshwaram	Sabitha Indra Reddy	INC	95,481	40.76	Teegala Krishna Reddy	TRS	86,254	36.82	9,227
Ranga Reddy	51	Rajendranagar	T. Prakash Goud	TRS	108,964	43.42	Ganesh Renukuntla	TDP	50,591	20.16	58,373
Ranga Reddy	52	Serilingampally	Arekapudi Gandhi	TRS	143,307	51.22	V. Ananda Prasad	TDP	99,012	35.39	44,295
Ranga Reddy	53	Chevella (SC)	Kale Yadaiah	TRS	99,168	55.96	K. S. Ratnam	INC	65,616	37.03	33,552
Ranga Reddy	54	Pargi	Koppula Mahesh Reddy	TRS	83,467	47.60	T. Ram Mohan Reddy	INC	67,626	38.56	15,841
Ranga Reddy	55	Vikarabad (SC)	Methuku Anand	TRS	59,971	39.40	G. Prasad Kumar	INC	56,879	37.46	3,092
Ranga Reddy	56	Tandur	Pilot Rohith Reddy	INC	70,428	45.02	P. Mahender Reddy	TRS	67,553	43.18	2,875
Hyderabad	57	Musheerabad	Muta Gopal	TRS	72,997	50.42	M. Anil Kumar Yadav	INC	36,087	24.93	36,910
Hyderabad	58	Malakpet	Ahmed Bin Abdullah Balala	AIMIM	53,281	42.86	Mohammed Muzaffar Ali Khan	TDP	29,769	23.95	23,512
Hyderabad	59	Amberpet	Kaleru Venkatesh	TRS	61,558	45.79	G. Kishan Reddy	BJP	60,542	45.03	1,016
Hyderabad	60	Khairatabad	Danam Nagender	TRS	63,068	44.56	Chintala Ramachandra Reddy	BJP	34,666	24.50	28,402
Hyderabad	61	Jubilee Hills	Maganti Gopinath	TRS	68,979	44.30	P. Vishnuvardhan Reddy	INC	52,975	34.02	16,004
Hyderabad	62	Sanathnagar	Talasani Srinivas Yadav	TRS	66,464	55.52	Kuna Venkatesh Goud	TDP	35,813	29.91	30,651
Hyderabad	63	Nampally	Jaffer Hussain	AIMIM	57,940	41.99	Mohammed Feroz Khan	INC	48,265	34.98	9,675
Hyderabad	64	Karwan	Kausar Mohiuddin	AIMIM	87,586	52.88	Amar Singh	BJP	37,417	22.59	50,169
Hyderabad	65	Goshamahal	T. Raja Singh	BJP	61,854	45.18	Prem Singh Rathore	TRS	44,120	32.23	17,734
Hyderabad	66	Charminar	Mumtaz Ahmed Khan	AIMIM	53,808	53.36	T. Uma Mahendra	BJP	21,222	21.04	32,,586
Hyderabad	67	Chandrayangutta	Akbaruddin Owaisi	AIMIM	95,339	67.95	Shahejadi Sayyad	BJP	15,075	10.75	80,264
Hyderabad	68	Yakutpura	Syed Ahmed Pasha Quadri	AIMIM	69,595	49.07	Sama Sunder Reddy	TRS	22,617	15.95	46,978
Hyderabad	69	Bahadurpura	Mohammad Moazam Khan	AIMIM	96,993	74.26	Mir Inayath Ali Baqri	TRS	14,475	11.08	82,518
Hyderabad	70	Secunderabad	T. Padma Rao Goud	TRS	79,309	60.18	Kasani Gnaneshwar Mudiraj	INC	33,839	25.68	45,470
Hyderabad	71	Secunderabad Cantt. (SC)	G. Sayanna	TRS	65,797	55.90	Sarve Satyanarayana	INC	28,234	23.99	37,563
Mahabubnagar	72	Kodangal	Patnam Narendra Reddy	TRS	80,754	48.78	Revanth Reddy	INC	71,435	43.15	9,319
Mahabubnagar	73	Narayanpet	S. Rajender Reddy	TRS	68,767	42.51	K. Shivkumar Reddy	BLPF	53,580	33.12	15,187
Mahabubnagar	74	Mahbubnagar	V. Srinivas Goud	TRS	86,474	54.16	M. Chandra Shekhar	TDP	28,699	17.97	57,775
Mahabubnagar	75	Jadcherla	Charlakota Laxma Reddy	TRS	94,598	58.95	Mallu Ravi	INC	49,516	30.85	45,082
Mahabubnagar	76	Devarkadra	Alla Venkateshwar Reddy	TRS	96,130	55.12	Pavan Kumar	INC	60,882	34.91	35,248
Mahabubnagar	77	Makthal	Chittem Rammohan Reddy	TRS	78,686	47.77	Jalander Reddy	IND	30,371	18.40	48,315
Mahabubnagar	78	Wanaparthy	Singireddy Niranjan Reddy	TRS	111,956	60.31	Jillela Chinna Reddy	INC	60,271	32.47	51,685
Mahabubnagar	79	Gadwal	Bandla Krishna Mohan Reddy	TRS	100,415	52.60	D. K. Aruna	INC	72,155	37.64	28,260
Mahabubnagar	80	Alampur (SC)	V. M. Abraham	TRS	102,105	56.83	S. A. Sampath Kumar	INC	57,426	31.96	44,679
Mahabubnagar	81	Nagarkurnool	Marri Janardhan Reddy	TRS	102,493	60.80	Nagam Janardhan Reddy	INC	48,139	28.56	54,354
Mahabubnagar	82	Achampet (SC)	Guvvala Balaraju	TRS	88,073	50.11	Chikkudu Vamshi Krishna	INC	78,959	44.66	91,14
Mahabubnagar	83	Kalwakurthy	Gurka Jaipal Yadav	TRS	62,892	35.35	Achary Talloju	BJP	59,445	33.41	3,447
Mahabubnagar	84	Shadnagar	Anjaiah Yelganamoni	TRS	72,315	43.43	Chowlapally Pratap Reddy	INC	51,890	31.16	20,425
Mahabubnagar	85	Kollapur	Beeram Harshavardhan Reddy	INC	80,611	46.36	Jupally Krishna Rao	TRS	68,068	39.15	12,543
Nalgonda	86	Devarakonda (ST)	Ravindra Kumar Ramavath	TRS	96,454	51.97	Balu Naik Nenavath	INC	57,606	31.04	38,848
Nalgonda	87	Nagarjuna Sagar	Nomula Narsimhaiah	TRS	83,655	46.33	Kunduru Jana Reddy	INC	75,884	42.05	7,771
Nalgonda	88	Miryalaguda	Nallamothu Bhaskar Rao	TRS	83,931	46.90	R. Krishnaiah	INC	53,279	29.77	30,652
Nalgonda	89	Huzurnagar	N. Uttam Kumar Reddy	INC	92,996	47.82	Shanampudi Saidireddy	TRS	85,530	43.98	7,466
Nalgonda	90	Kodad	Bollam Mallaiah Yadav	TRS	89,115	45.96	N. Padmavathi Reddy	INC	88,359	45.57	756
Nalgonda	91	Suryapet	Guntakandla Jagadish Reddy	TRS	68,650	37.34	Damodar Reddy Ram Reddy	INC	62,683	34.10	5,967
Nalgonda	92	Nalgonda	Kancharla Bhupal Reddy	TRS	98,792	53.22	Komatireddy Venkat Reddy	INC	75,094	40.46	23,698
Nalgonda	93	Munugode	Komatireddy Raj Gopal Reddy	INC	97,239	48.90	Kusukuntla Prabhakar Reddy	TRS	74,687	37.56	22,552
Nalgonda	94	Bhongir	Pailla Shekar Reddy	TRS	85,476	49.34	Anil Kumar Reddy Kumbam	INC	61,413	35.45	24,063
Nalgonda	95	Nakrekal (SC)	Chirumarthi Lingaiah	INC	93,699	46.33	Vemula Veeresham	TRS	85,440	42.25	8,259
Nalgonda	96	Thungathurthi (SC)	Gadari Kishore Kumar	TRS	90,857	45.47	Addanki Dayakar	INC	89,010	44.54	1,847
Nalgonda	97	Alair	Gongidi Sunitha	TRS	94,870	49.55	Budida Bikshamaiah Goud	INC	61,784	32.27	33,086
Warangal	98	Jangaon	Muthireddy Yadagiri Reddy	TRS	91,592	50.47	Ponnala Lakshmaiah	INC	62,024	34.18	29,568
Warangal	99	Ghanpur Station (SC)	T. Rajaiah	TRS	98,612	49.57	Indira Singapuram	INC	62,822	31.58	35,790
Warangal	100	Palakurthi	Errabelli Dayakar Rao	TRS	117,504	59.19	Janga Ragavareddy	INC	64,451	32.47	53,053
Warangal	101	Dornakal	Dharamsoth Redya Naik	TRS	88,307	50.73	Jatoth Ram Chandru Naik	INC	70,926	40.74	17,381
Warangal	102	Mahabubabad (ST)	Banoth Shankar Nayak	TRS	85,397	46.18	Balram Naik	INC	71,863	38.86	13,534
Warangal	103	Narsampet	P. Sudarshan Reddy	TRS	94,135	49.80	Donthi Madhava Reddy	INC	77,186	40.85	16,949
Warangal	104	Parkal	Challa Dharma Reddy	TRS	105,903	59.64	Konda Surekha	INC	59,384	33.44	46,519
Warangal	105	Warangal West	Dasyam Vinay Bhasker	TRS	81,006	56.78	Revuri Prakash Reddy	TDP	44,555	31.23	36,451
Warangal	106	Warangal East	Nannapuneni Narender	TRS	83,922	53.94	Ravi Chandra Vaddiraju	INC	55,140	35.44	28,782
Warangal	107	Waradhanapet (SC)	Aroori Ramesh	TRS	131,252	69.35	Devaiah Pagidipati	TJS	32,012	16.91	99,240
Warangal	108	Bhupalpalle	Gandra Venkata Ramana Reddy	INC	69,918	33.50	Gandra Sathyanarayana Rao	AIFB	54,283	26.00	15,635
Warangal	109	Mulug (ST)	Dansari Anasuya	INC	88,971	52.71	Azmeera Chandulal	TRS	66,300	39.28	22,671
Khammam	110	Pinapaka (ST)	Rega Kantha Rao	INC	72,283	50.13	Payam Venkateswarlu	TRS	52,718	36.56	19,565
Khammam	111	Yellandu (ST)	Haripriya Banoth	INC	70,644	42.95	Koram Kanakaiah	TRS	67,757	41.20	2,887
Khammam	112	Khammam	Puvvada Ajay Kumar	TRS	102,760	49.78	Nama Nageswara Rao	TDP	91,769	44.46	10,991
Khammam	113	Palair	Kandala Upender Reddy	INC	89,407	46.53	Thummala Nageswara Rao	TRS	81,738	42.54	7,669
Khammam	114	Madhira (SC)	Mallu Bhatti Vikramarka	INC	80,598	43.11	Kamal Raju Lingala	TRS	77,031	41.21	3,567
Khammam	115	Wyra (ST)	Lavudya Ramulu	IND	52,650	33.36	Banoth Madan Lal	TRS	50,637	32.08	2,013
Khammam	116	Sathupalli (SC)	Sandra Venkata Veeraiah	TDP	100,044	50.46	Pidamarthi Ravi	TRS	81,042	40.87	19,002
Khammam	117	Kothagudem	Vanama Venkateswara Rao	INC	81,118	46.78	Jalagam Venkat Rao	TRS	76,979	44.39	4,139
Khammam	118	Aswaraopeta (ST)	Mecha Nageswara Rao	TDP	61,124	48.21	Thati Venkateswarlu	TRS	48,007	37.86	13,117
Khammam	119	Bhadrachalam (ST)	Podem Veeraiah	INC	47,746	43.23	Dr. Tellam Venkata Rao	TRS	35,961	32.56	11,785

== Post Election Defection ==
=== 2019 ===
The 12 Congress MLAs who defected to the TRS on 6 June 2019 were:

Defected MLAs
#	MLA	Constituency	Party	Merged
1	Kandala Upender Reddy	Palair	INC	TRS
2	Jajala Surender	Yellareddy	INC	TRS
3	Haripriya Banoth	Yellandu	INC	TRS
4	D. Sudheer Reddy	LB Nagar	INC	TRS
5	Gandra Venkata Ramana Reddy	Bhupalpalle	INC	TRS
6	Chirumarthi Lingaiah	Nakrekal	INC	TRS
7	Rega Kantha Rao	Pinapaka	INC	TRS
8	Sabitha Indra Reddy	Maheshwaram	INC	TRS
9	Athram Sakku	Asifabad	INC	TRS
10	Beeram Harshavardhan Reddy	Kollapur	INC	TRS
11	Vanama Venkateswara Rao	Kothagudem	INC	TRS
12	Pilot Rohith Reddy	Tandur	INC	TRS

Most of them (11) had already quietly switched sides between mid-March and late April 2019. Rohith Reddy was the 12th to jump ship on 6 June itself — a day after Uttam Kumar Reddy resigned his Huzurnagar MLA seat following his Nalgonda Lok Sabha victory, which reduced the Congress strength to 18 and brought the two-thirds threshold down to exactly 12.

In the 2023 Telangana elections, 10 of the 12 lost their seats; only Sabitha Indra Reddy and D. Sudheer Reddy managed to win.

=== 2021 ===
In April 2021, the Telugu Desam Party (TDP) lost its entire presence in the Telangana Legislative Assembly when its two remaining MLAs, Sandra Venkata Veeraiah and Mecha Nageswara Rao, formally merged the TDP Legislature Party with the ruling Bharat Rashtra Samithi (then known as TRS).

The merger was finalized on 7 April 2021, after the legislators submitted a letter to Assembly Speaker Pocharam Srinivas Reddy to merge under Paragraph 4 of the Tenth Schedule of the Constitution, thereby avoiding anti-defection provisions. This move increased the TRS seat count to 104 in the 119-member house and left the TDP with no representation in either house of the Telangana Legislature.

Defected MLAs from TDP to TRS
#	MLA	Constituency	Party	Merged
1	Sandra Venkata Veeraiah	Sathupalli	TDP	TRS
2	Mecha Nageswara Rao	Aswaraopeta	TDP	TRS

== Bypolls ==
District	Constituency		Winner				Runner Up				Margin
District	No.	Name	Candidate	Party	Votes	%	Candidate	Party	Votes	%	Margin
Suryapet	89	Huzurnagar	Shanampudi Saidireddy	TRS	113,095	56.34	N. Padmavathi Reddy	INC	69,737	34.74	43,358
Suryapet	89	Huzurnagar	Bypoll held on 21 October 2019 following the resignation of the incumbent member N. Uttam Kumar Reddy from Indian National Congress as MLA on 5 June 2019.								
Siddipet	41	Dubbak	Raghunandan Rao	BJP	63,352	38.47	Solipeta Sujatha Reddy	TRS	62,273	37.82	1,079
Siddipet	41	Dubbak	Bypoll held on 3 November 2020 following the death of the incumbent member Solipeta Ramalinga Reddy from Telangana Rashtra Samithi on 6 August 2020.								
Nalgonda	87	Nagarjuna Sagar	Nomula Bhagath	TRS	89,804	47.05	Kunduru Jana Reddy	INC	70,932	37.16	7,771
Nalgonda	87	Nagarjuna Sagar	Bypoll held on 17 April 2021 following the death of the incumbent member Nomula Narsimhaiah from Telangana Rashtra Samithi on 1 December 2020.								
Karimnagar	31	Huzurabad	Etela Rajender	BJP	107,022	51.96	Gellu Srinivas Yadav	TRS	83,167	40.38	23,855
Karimnagar	31	Huzurabad	Bypoll held on 30 October 2021 following the resignation of the incumbent member Etela Rajender from Telangana Rashtra Samithi as MLA on 12 June 2022.								
Nalgonda	93	Munugode	Kusukuntla Prabhakar Reddy	TRS	97,006	42.95	Komatireddy Rajagopal Reddy	BJP	86,697	38.38	10,309
Nalgonda	93	Munugode	Bypoll held on 3 November 2022 following the resignation of the incumbent member Komatireddy Rajagopal Reddy from Indian National Congress as MLA on 8 August 2022.								

== See also ==
- 2018 elections in India
- List of constituencies of Telangana Legislative Assembly
