= Aswaraopeta Assembly constituency =

Constituency of the Telangana legislative assembly in India

Coordinates: 17.24°N 81.13°E

Aswaraopeta
- Constituency No. 118 for the Telangana Legislative Assembly
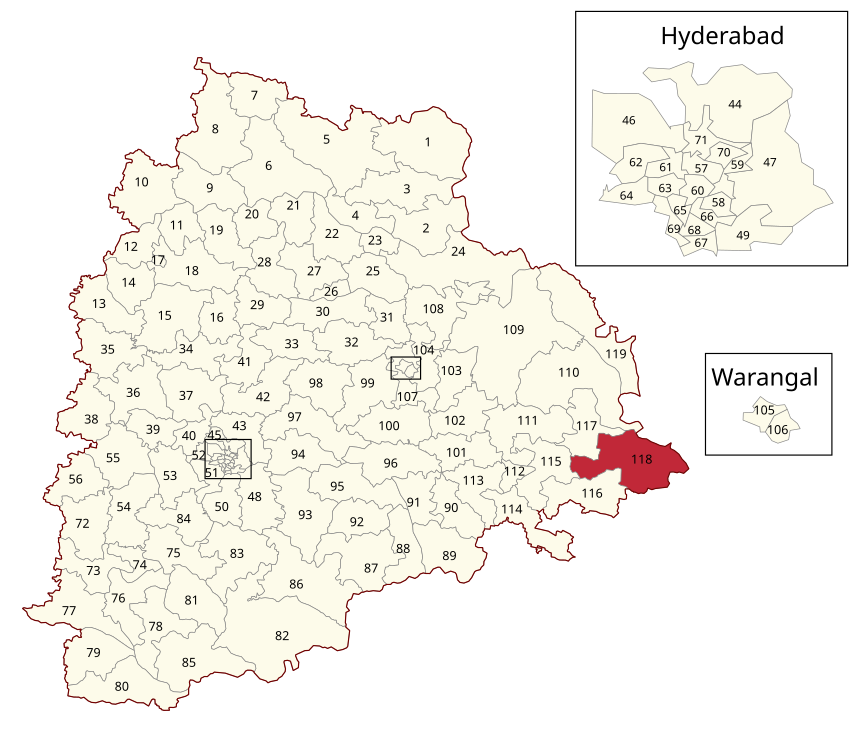
- Location of Aswaraopeta Assembly constituency within Telangana

Constituency details
- Country: India
- Region: South India
- State: Telangana
- District: Khammam
- Lok Sabha constituency: Khammam
- Established: 2008
- Total electors: 1,64,410
- Reservation: ST

Member of Legislative Assembly
- 3rd Telangana Legislative Assembly
- Incumbent Jare Adinarayana
- Party: Indian National Congress
- Elected year: 2023

Aswaraopeta Assembly constituency is a ST reserved constituency of Telangana Legislative Assembly, India. It is one of 10 constituencies in Khammam district. It is part of Khammam Lok Sabha constituency.

Jare Adinarayana of the Indian National Congress represents the constituency.

== Mandals ==
The Assembly Constituency presently comprises the following Mandals:

Mandal
Aswaraopeta
Chandrugonda
Dammapeta
Mulakalapally

== Members of the Legislative Assembly ==
Year	Member	Party
2009	Mitrasena Vageela	Indian National Congress
2014	Thati Venkateswarlu	YSR Congress Party
2018	Mecha Nageswara Rao	Telugu Desam Party
2023	Jare Adinarayana	Indian National Congress

== Election results ==
Vote share of Winning candidates
2023	55.05%
2018	48.21%
2014	34.49%
2009	36.85%

=== 2023 ===
2023 Telangana Legislative Assembly election: Aswaraopeta (ST)
Party	Candidate	Votes	%	±%
INC	Jare Adinarayana	74,993	55.05	
BRS	Mecha Nageswara Rao	46,088	33.83	
CPI(M)	Arjunarao Pittala	2,488	1.83	
JSP	Muyyaboina Uma Devi	2,281	1.67	
IND	Kishor Kalluri	1,907	1.40	
AODRP	Paddam Venkata Ramana	1,754	1.29	
BSP	Madakam Prasad	1,580	1.16	
NOTA	None of the Above	1,363	1.00	
IND	Thamballa Ravi	922	0.68	
GNDWDKP	Uke Ravi	857	0.63	
BCYP	Manugonda Venkata Mutyam	678	0.50	
IND	Kunja Nagamani	484	0.36	
IND	Vuke Muktheswararao	419	0.31	
IND	Angothu Krishna	232	0.17	
GGP	Kanneboina Venkatanarsaiah	178	0.13	
Majority		28,905	21.22	
Turnout		136,224	87.32	
Swing to INC from TDP		Swing		

=== 2018 ===
2018 Telangana Legislative Assembly election: Aswaraopeta (ST)
Party	Candidate	Votes	%	±%
TDP	Mecha Nageswara Rao (Note: TDP candidate was joint candidate from Praja Kutami which was supported by INC, TJS and CPI)	61,124	48.21	▲14.37
TRS	Thati Venkateswarlu	48,007	37.86	▲28.66
CPI(M)	Tanam Ravindar	4,955	3.91	New entry
IND	Kangala Kallaiah	4,833	3.81	Steady
NOTA	None of the Above	2,053	1.62	▲0.82
IND	Thati Venkateswarlu	1,714	1.35	Steady
BJP	Dr. Bhukya Prasada Rao	1,303	1.03	New entry
PPOI	Gugolothu Ramulu	882	0.70	▼0.32
GGP	Kanneboina Venkata Narsaiah	481	0.38	Steady
BSP	Banoth Ramesh	460	0.36	▼0.20
IND	Kanithi Lakshmana Rao	429	0.34	Steady
IND	Amgothu Krishna	284	0.22	Steady
BMUP	Mood Balaji	275	0.22	New entry
Majority		13,117	10.35	▲9.70
Turnout		126,800	88.06	▲2.30
Swing to TDP from YSRCP		Swing		

=== 2014 ===
2014 Andhra Pradesh Legislative Assembly election: Aswaraopeta (ST)
Party	Candidate	Votes	%	±%
YSRCP	Thati Venkateswarlu	49,546	34.49	New entry
TDP	Mecha Nageswara Rao	48,616	33.84	New entry
INC	Mitrasena Vageela	15,101	10.51	▼26.34
TRS	Adinarayana Jare	13,217	9.20	New entry
IND	Karam Bhadramma (Sandhya)	6,731	4.69	Steady
IND	Bhukya Prasada Rao	2,688	1.87	Steady
PPOI	B. Jan Babu	1,459	1.02	▼0.30
IND	Korsa Venkatesh Dora	1,255	0.87	Steady
NOTA	None of the Above	1,145	0.80	New entry
BSP	Balakrishna Sadiyam	807	0.56	New entry
IND	Venkata Narasaiah Kanneboina	692	0.48	Steady
JSP	Payam Pothaiah	679	0.47	New entry
IND	Thati Venkatesh	595	0.41	Steady
IND	Banavath Nanda	520	0.36	Steady
IND	Angothu Krishna	324	0.23	Steady
IND	Podiyam Krishna	281	0.20	Steady
Majority		930	0.65	▼3.42
Turnout		143,656	85.76	▲3.98
Swing to YSRCP from INC		Swing		

=== 2009 ===
2009 Andhra Pradesh Legislative Assembly election: Aswaraopeta (ST)
Party	Candidate	Votes	%	±%
INC	Mithrasena Vaggela	46,183	36.85	
CPI(M)	Payam Venkaiah	41,076	32.78	
PRP	Nagendra Rao Thati	19,740	15.75	
IND	Purem Buchi Raju	9,106	7.27	
IND	K. Vinayak	2,946	2.35	
IND	Ravula Srinivas Rao	1,806	1.44	
PPOI	Banothu Janbabu	1,651	1.32	
IND	Thati Venkateswarlu	994	0.79	
CPI(ML)L	Regula Veeraswamy	968	0.77	
IND	Kanneboina Venkata Narsaiah	843	0.67	
Majority		5,107	4.07	
Turnout		125,313	81.78	
INC win (new seat)				

== See also ==
- List of constituencies of Telangana Legislative Assembly
