= Muddasani =

Muddasani (Telugu: ముద్దసాని) is a Telugu surname. Notable people with the surname include:

- Muddasani Damodar Reddy (1956–2012), Indian politician
- Muddasani Kodandarama Reddy (born 1955), Indian politician
