= Ramagundam Assembly constituency =

Constituency of the Telangana legislative assembly in India

Coordinates: 18.76°N 79.48°E

Ramagundam
- Constituency No. 23 for the Telangana Legislative Assembly
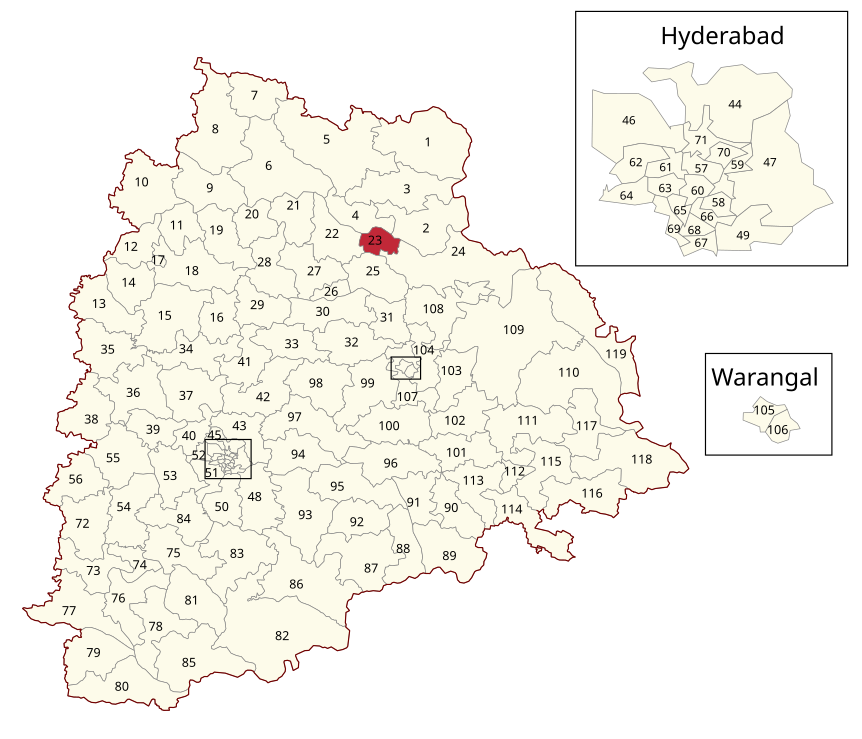
- Location of Ramagundam Assembly constituency within Telangana

Constituency details
- Country: India
- Region: South India
- State: Telangana
- District: Peddapalli
- Lok Sabha constituency: Peddapalli
- Established: 2008
- Total electors: 1,59,953
- Reservation: None

Member of Legislative Assembly
- 3rd Telangana Legislative Assembly
- Incumbent Makkan Singh Raj Thakur
- Party: INC
- Elected year: 2023

Ramagundam Assembly constituency is a constituency of Telangana Legislative Assembly, India. It is one of constituencies in Peddapalli district. It includes the city of Ramagundam. It is part of Peddapalli Lok Sabha constituency.

Makkan Singh Raj Thakur won the 2023 Telangana Legislative Assembly election from Ramagundam.

== Mandals ==
The Ramagundam Assembly constituency comprises the following mandals:

Mandal
Ramagundam Urban
Kamanpur & Palakurthi (Ramagundam Rural)

== Members of the Legislative Assembly ==
| Election | Name | Party |
United Andhra Pradesh
| 2009 | Somarapu Satyanarayana | Independent |
Telangana
| 2014 | Somarapu Satyanarayana | Telangana Rashtra Samithi |
| 2018 | Korukanti Chandar | All India Forward Bloc |
| 2023 | Makkan Singh Raj Thakur | Indian National Congress |

== Election results ==
=== Telangana Legislative Assembly election, 2023 ===
Telangana Assembly Elections, 2023: Ramagundam (Assembly constituency)
| Party | Candidate | Votes | % | ±% |
|---|---|---|---|---|
| INC | Makkan Singh Raj Thakur | 92,227 | 60.28 | |
| BRS | Korukanti Chandar | 35,433 | 23.16 | |
| BJP | Kandula Sandhyarani | 12,966 | 8.48 | |
| Independent | Somarapu Satyanarayana | 4,048 | 2.65 | |
| Independent | Gudimalla Kirthi kanth | 439 | 0.30 | |
| NOTA | None of the above | 1,572 | 1.03 | |
| Majority | | 56,794 | 37.12 | |
| Turnout | | 1,52,988 | | |
| INC gain from BRS | | Swing | | |

=== Telangana Legislative Assembly election, 2018 ===
Telangana Assembly Elections, 2018: Ramagundam (Assembly constituency)
| Party | Candidate | Votes | % | ±% |
|---|---|---|---|---|
| AIFB | Korukanti Chandar | 61,400 | 45.10 | +20.77 |
| TRS | Somarapu Satyanarayana | 34,981 | 25.69 | −0.31 |
| INC | Makkan Singh Raj Thakur | 27,181 | 19.97 | +7.69 |
| SFB | Venkatesh Muthyalu | 3,531 | 2.59 | |
| BSP | Merugu Shankar | 1,797 | 1.32 | |
| BJP | Vanitha Balmuri | 1,553 | 1.14 | −4.6 |
| NOTA | None of the Above | 1,078 | 0.79 | +0.34 |
| Majority | | 26,419 | 19.41 | |
| Turnout | | 1,36,140 | 71.94 | |
| AIFB gain from TRS | | Swing | | |

=== Telangana Legislative Assembly election, 2014 ===
Telangana Assembly Elections, 2014: Ramagundam (Assembly constituency)
| Party | Candidate | Votes | % | ±% |
|---|---|---|---|---|
| TRS | Somarapu Satyanarayana | 35,789 | 26.00 | +12.6 |
| AIFB | Korukanti Chandar | 33,494 | 24.33 | +24.33 |
| INC | Babar Saleem Pasha | 16,900 | 12.28 | −7.32 |
| Independent | Koushika Harinadh | 13,577 | 9.86 | |
| Independent | Makkansingh Raj Thakur | 11,387 | 8.27 | |
| BJP | Gujjula Ramakrishna Reddy | 7,894 | 5.74 | |
| NOTA | None of the Above | 619 | 0.45 | |
| Majority | | 2,295 | 1.67 | −0.23 |
| Turnout | | 1,37,638 | 61.87 | +3.77 |
| TRS gain from Independent | | Swing | | |

=== Andhra Pradesh Legislative Assembly election, 2009 ===
Andhra Pradesh Assembly Elections, 2009: Ramagundam (Assembly constituency)
| Party | Candidate | Votes | % | ±% |
|---|---|---|---|---|
| Independent | Somarapu Satyanarayana | 32,479 | 27.3 | |
| PRP | Kausika Hari Nath | 30,259 | 25.4 | |
| INC | Babar Saleem Pasha | 23,283 | 19.6 | |
| TRS | Korukanti Chandar | 15,984 | 13.4 | |
| Majority | | 2,220 | 1.9 | |
| Turnout | | 1,19,051 | 58.1 | |
| Independent win (new seat) | | | | |

== See also ==
- List of constituencies of Telangana Legislative Assembly
