= Maha Kutami =

Maha Kutami may refer to:

- Maha Kutami (2009), a pre-poll alliance between the Telugu Desam Party, the Communist Party of India (Marxist), the Communist Party of India, and the Telangana Rashtra Samithi in the Indian state of Andhra Pradesh
- Praja Kutami, a pre-poll alliance between the Indian National Congress, the Telugu Desam Party, the Communist Party of India, and the Telangana Jana Samithi, which fought the 2018 Telangana Legislative Assembly elections
