= Korukanti Chandar =

Indian politician

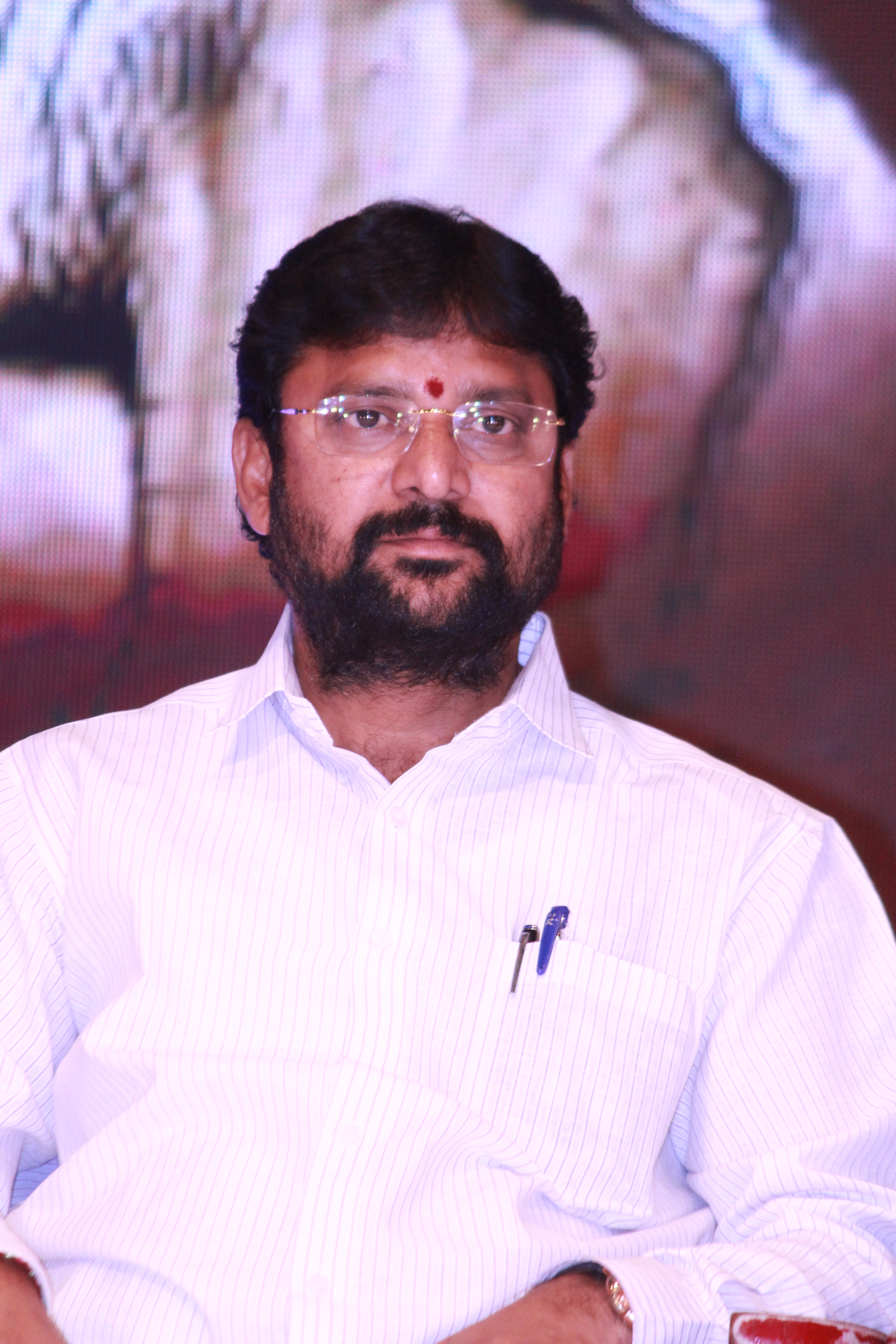

Member of the Telangana Legislative Assembly
- In office 2018 – 4 December 2023
- Preceded by: Somarapu Satyanarayana
- Succeeded by: Makkan Singh Raj Thakur
- Constituency: Ramagundam

Personal details
- Born: 23 September 1973 (age 52) Ramagundam, Telangana, India
- Party: Bharat Rashtra Samithi
- Spouse(s): K. Vijaya (died 2018)
- Parents: K. Mallaiah (father); Laxmi (mother)

Korukanti Chandar Patel (born 23 September 1973) is an elected representative from Ramagundam constituency in the Telangana Legislative Assembly. In the 2018 Telangana Assembly elections.
