= Thati Venkateswarlu =

Indian politician

Thati Venkateswarlu (born 1 July 1962) is an Indian politician from Telangana state. He was a former two time Member of the Legislative Assembly. He won from Burgampahad Assembly constituency in 1999 representing the Telugu Desam Party, and from Aswaraopeta Assembly constituency in 2014, both of which are reserved for Scheduled Tribe community, in the ersthile Khammam district representing the YSR Congress Party.

== Early life ==
Venkateswarlu is from Aswaraopeta, Bhadradri district, Telangana. He is the son of the late Thati Katappa. He studied at ZP high school, Jelugumilli village till Class 9 and dropped out in Class 10. He declared assets worth Rs.3 crore in 2018, in his affidavit to the Election Commission of India.

== Career ==
Venkateswarlu won the Aswaraopeta Assembly constituency in the 2014 Andhra Pradesh Legislative Assembly election, where the elections were held concurrently for both Andhra Pradesh and Telangana He represented YSR Congress Party and polled 49,546 votes and defeated his nearest rival, Mecha Nageswara Rao, of the Telugu Desam Party by a margin of 930 votes. He first became an MLA winning the then Burgampahad Assembly constituency in the 1999 Andhra Pradesh Legislative Assembly election where he polled 45,904 votes and defeated his closest opponent, Chanda Lingaiah of the Indian National Congress, by a margin of 2,928 votes.

He served as the president of Velerupadu mandal, in the erstwhile Khammam district.
