= Jare Adinarayana =

Indian politician

Jare Adinarayana (born 1973) is an Indian politician from Telangana state. He is an MLA from Aswaraopeta Assembly constituency which is reserved for ST community Bhadradri Kothagudem district. He represents Indian National Congress Party and won the 2023 Telangana Legislative Assembly election.

== Early life and education ==
Adinarayana is from Aswaraopeta, in the erstwhile Khammam district. He was born to Sathyanarayana. He is interested in farming and he married a school teacher. He did his M.Sc. in mathematics in 2012. Earlier, he completed his bachelor's degree in Physical Education from Nagarjuna University in 2010.

== Career ==
Adinarayana won from Aswaraopeta Assembly constituency representing Indian National Congress in the 2023 Telangana Legislative Assembly election. He polled 74,993 votes, and defeated his nearest rival Mecha Nageswara Rao of Bharat Rashtra Samithi by a margin of 28,905 votes.
