= Esa Misri =

Indian bodybuilder

Esa Bin Obaid Misri
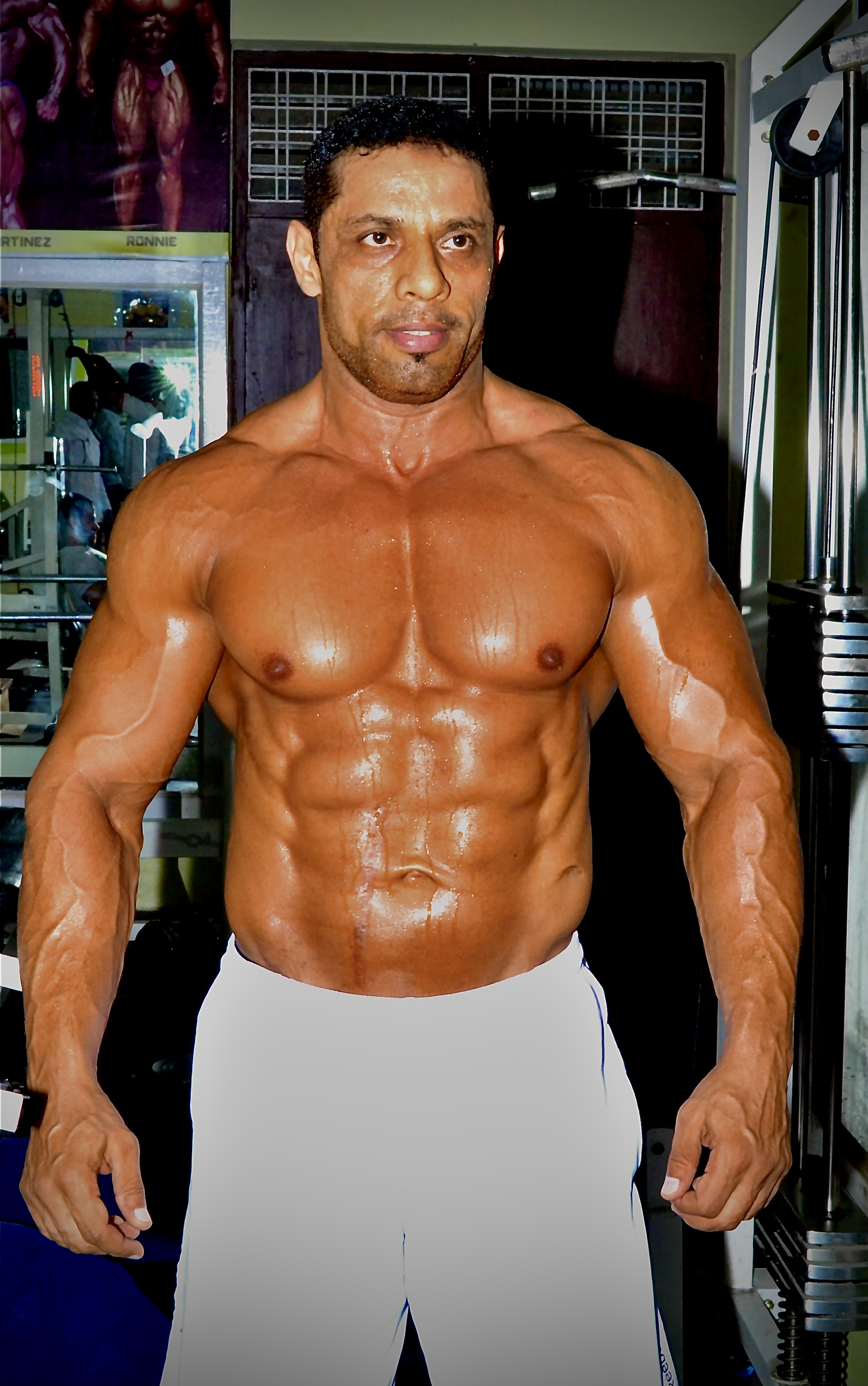
- Esa Bin Obaid Misri
- Born: March 12, 1969 (age 56); Hyderabad, Telangana, India
- Known for: Mr. India 2009, Mr. Universe 2015
- Children: 6
- Parent(s): Lt.Obaid Bin Ali Misri (father), Lt. Taqiya Begum (mother)

Esa Bin Obaid Misri is an Indian professional bodybuilder from Hyderabad, Telangana State, India who won multiple titles in both state and national championships. The highest title he won was the Silver medallist at the 2016 Mr Universe Championship in the heavy weight category of 90 kg. He recently contested against AIMIM's Akbaruddin Owaisi.

== Titles ==
- Mr. Hyderabad (2009)
- Mr. Pride of Hyderabad (2014)
- Mr. Andhra Pradesh (9 times)
- Mr. India (2009)
- Mr. Universe (2015)
- Mr. MuscleMania World (2015)

== Early life and education ==
Born in Hyderabad, India to Obaid Bin Ali Misri and Taqiya Begum, Esa Misri was student of Kilpatrik Mission School. He is of Chaush ancestry.

He owns a gym with the name Misri gym and a function hall named Noori Palace Function hall located in Bandlaguda Chandrayan Gutta, Hyderabad.

== Political career ==
He joined the Indian National Congress and contested as a candidate for the Chandrayangutta constituency in the 2018 elections.
