= Rajendranagar Assembly constituency =

Constituency of the Telangana legislative assembly in India

Coordinates: 17.31°N 78.40°E

Rajendranagar
- Constituency No. 51 for the Telangana Legislative Assembly
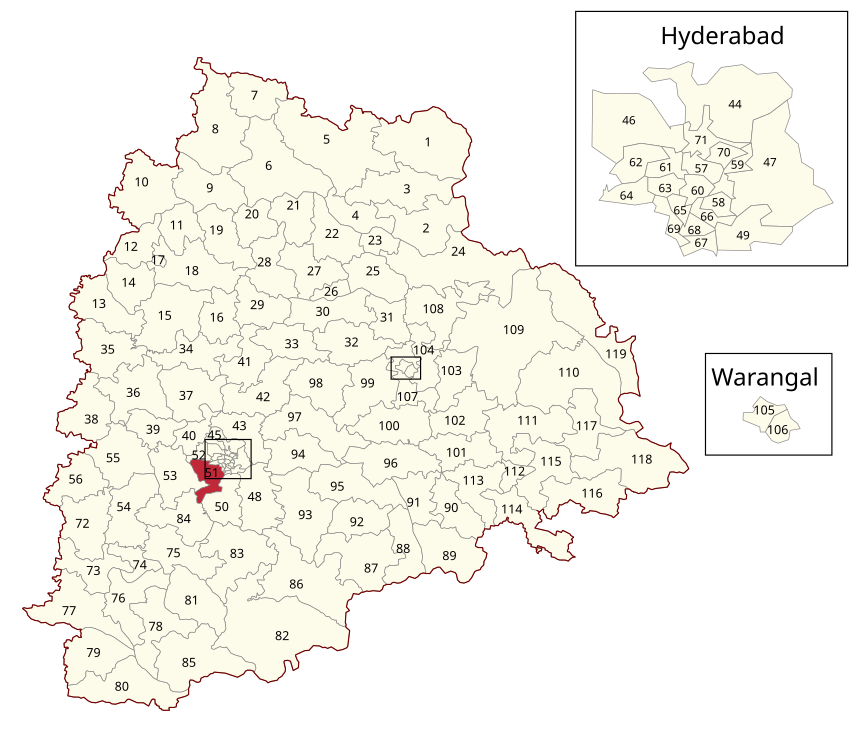
- Location of Rajendranagar Assembly constituency within Telangana

Constituency details
- Country: India
- Region: South India
- State: Telangana
- District: Ranga Reddy
- Lok Sabha constituency: Chevella
- Established: 2008
- Total electors: 4,40,000
- Reservation: None

Member of Legislative Assembly
- 3rd Telangana Legislative Assembly
- Incumbent T. Prakash Goud
- Party: INC
- Elected year: 2023

Rajendranagar Assembly constituency is a legislative constituency of Telangana Legislative Assembly, India. It is one of the constituencies in Ranga Reddy district. It is part of Chevella Lok Sabha constituency. It is also one of the 24 constituencies of Greater Hyderabad Municipal Corporation.

T. Prakash Goud is currently representing the constituency. He joined Indian National Congress in 2024.

== Overview ==
It is newly formed constituency in 2009 general election (As per Delimitation Act of 2002) delimited from Chevella Assembly constituency. Rajendranagar Assembly constituency comprises four municipal divisions-Shivrampally, Mailardevpally, Rajendranagar and Attapur. Areas like Hassan Nagar and Shastripuram border the core of the Old Hyderabad City areas of Bahadurpura and Chandrayangutta. The Assembly Constituency presently comprises the following Mandals:

Mandal
Rajendranagar
Shamshabad
Gandipet

== Members of Legislative Assembly ==
Duration	Member	Political party
Andhra Pradesh
2009	T. Prakash Goud	Telugu Desam Party
Telangana
2014	T. Prakash Goud	Telugu Desam Party
2018	T. Prakash Goud	Telangana Rashtra Samithi
2023	T. Prakash Goud	Bharat Rashtra Samithi

== Election results ==
=== Assembly election 2023 ===
2023 Telangana Legislative Assembly election: Rajendranagar
Party	Candidate	Votes	%	±%
BRS	T. Prakash Goud (Note: Defected to Indian National Congress from Bharat Rashtra Samithi post election.)	121,734	37.09	▼6.33
BJP	Thokala Srinivas Reddy	89,638	27.31	▲19.49
INC	Kasturi Narendar	82,057	25.00	New
AIMIM	Mandagiri Swamy Yadav	25,670	7.82	▼10.73
NOTA	None of the Above	1,832	0.56	▼0.14
Majority		32,096	9.78	▼13.48
Turnout		3,28,436	56.43	
BRS hold		Swing		

=== Telangana Legislative Assembly election, 2018 ===
2018 Telangana Legislative Assembly election: Rajendranagar
Party	Candidate	Votes	%	±%
TRS	T. Prakash Goud	108,964	43.42	
TDP	Ganesh Renukuntla	50,591	20.16	
AIMIM	Mirza Rahmat Baig	46,547	18.55	
BJP	Baddam Bal Reddy	19,627	7.82	
AIFB	Tokala Srinivas Reddy	13,084	5.21	
NOTA	None of the Above	1,729	0.69	
Majority		58,373	23.26	
Turnout		2,50,934	56.89	
TRS hold		Swing		

=== Telangana Legislative Assembly election, 2014 ===
2014 Telangana Legislative Assembly election: Rajendranagar
Party	Candidate	Votes	%	±%
TDP	T. Prakash Goud	77,843		
INC	Gnaneshwar	51,962		
AIMIM	Zakeer Hussain Javed	49,053		
TRS	A. Swarnalatha Reddy	29,870		
YSRCP	Mujataba Ahmed	6,028		
NOTA	None of the Above	1,336		
Majority				
Turnout				
TDP hold		Swing		

=== Andhra Pradesh Legislative Assembly election, 2009 ===
2009 Andhra Pradesh Legislative Assembly election: Rajendranagar
Party	Candidate	Votes	%	±%
TDP	T. Prakash Goud	49,522	31.03	
INC	Gnaneshwar	42,037	26.34	
AIMIM	Yenugu Muralidhar Reddy	23,300	14.6	
BJP	Pathangi Rajbhoopal Goud	17,615	11.04	
Majority				
Turnout				
TDP hold		Swing		

== See also ==
- List of constituencies of Telangana Legislative Assembly
