= T. Prakash Goud =

Indian politician from Telangana (born 1959)

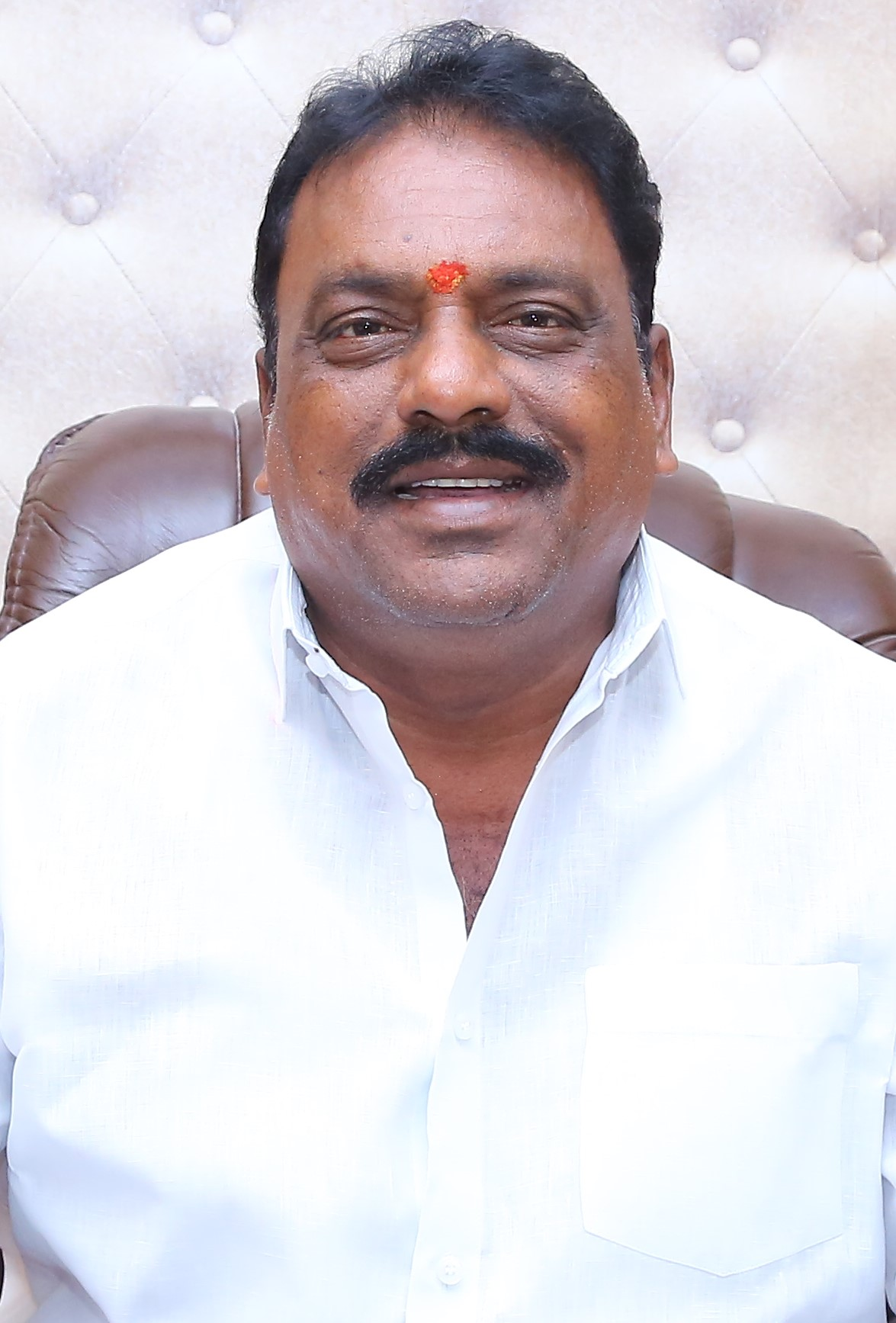

Tolkanti Prakash Goud (born 5 May 1959) is an Indian politician from Telangana, India. He is a four time MLA from Rajendranagar Assembly constituency in Ranga Reddy district. He currently represents Indian National Congress Party and won the 2023 Telangana Legislative Assembly election representing Bharat Rashtra Samithi Party He has been an elected MLA from Rajendranagar continuously from 2009. In July 2024, he joined Indian National Congress Party.

== Personal life ==
Goud is from Rajendranagar. He was born in Mylar Devarapalli village, Rajendranagar mandal, Ranga Reddy district, to father Tolkanti Gandaiah Goud and Lakshmamma. He left school after Class 5. He married Sulochana and they have three sons and two daughters. He also has a granddaughter Vennela and grandson, Vishwak Sen.

== Career ==
Goud was elected to Rajendranagar Assembly constituency representing Bharat Rashtra Samithi in the 2023 Telangana Legislative Assembly election. He polled 121,734 votes and defeated his nearest rival, Thokala Srinivas Reddy of Bharatiya Janata Party, by a margin of 32,096 votes.

He won as an MLA for the first time in 2009 representing Telugu Desam Party in the 2009 Andhra Pradesh Legislative Assembly election where he polled 49,522 votes and defeated his nearest rival, Kasani Gnaneshwar Mudiraj of Indian National Congress, by a margin of 7,485 votes. He retained the seat as TDP candidate in the 2014 Andhra Pradesh Legislative Assembly election where he polled 77.843 votes and defeated his nearest rival, B Gnaneshwar of Indian National Congress, by 25,881 votes. Later, he moved to Telangana Rashtra Samithi and won the 2018 Telangana Legislative Assembly election and became a four time MLA winning the 2023 Assembly election. In 2018 he polled 108,964 votes and defeated his nearest rival, Ganesh Renukuntla of Telugu Desam party, by 58,373 votes.
