= Bomma Venkateshwar =

Indian advocate and politician (died 2019)

MLA of Indurthi
- In office 1999–2004
- Preceded by: Chinna Mallaiah Deshini
- Succeeded by: Chada Venkat Reddy

Personal details
- Born: 1940/41
- Died: 18 March 2019
- Party: Indian National Congress

Bomma Venkateshwar was an Indian advocate and politician belonging to Indian National Congress. He was elected as a member of Andhra Pradesh Legislative Assembly from Indurthi in 1999. He died of cardiac arrest on 18 March 2019 at the age of 78.
