= Quthbullapur Assembly constituency =

Constituency of the Telangana legislative assembly in India

Coordinates: 17.499°N 78.464°E

Quthbullapur
- Constituency No. 45 for the Telangana Legislative Assembly
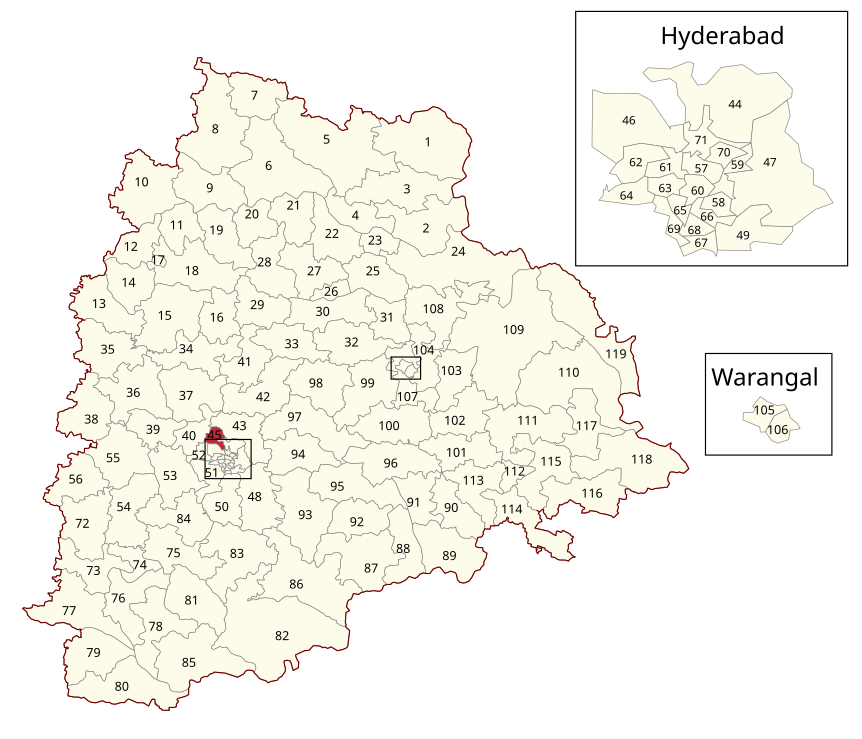
- Location of Quthbullapur Assembly constituency within Telangana

Constituency details
- Country: India
- Region: South India
- State: Telangana
- District: Medchal-Malkajgiri
- Lok Sabha constituency: Malkajgiri
- Established: 2008
- Total electors: 601,593
- Reservation: None

Member of Legislative Assembly
- 3rd Telangana Legislative Assembly
- Incumbent K. P. Vivekanand Goud
- Party: Bharat Rashtra Samithi
- Elected year: 2023

Quthbullapur Assembly constituency is a constituency of Telangana Legislative Assembly, India. It is one of 14 constituencies in Medchal–Malkajgiri district. It is part of Malkajgiri Lok Sabha constituency. It is also one of the 24 constituencies of GHMC.

K. P. Vivekanand Goud of Bharath Rasthra Samithi Party is currently representing the constituency.

== Overview ==
The Assembly Constituency presently comprises the following Mandals

Mandal	District
Quthbullapur	Medchal-Malkajgiri
Nizampet	Medchal-Malkajgiri
Rajiv Gruhakalpha, Nizampet	Medchal-Malkajgiri
Suchitra Center	Hyderabad
Kompally	Medchal-Malkajgiri
Jeedimetla	Medchal-Malkajgiri
Bowrampet	Medchal-Malkajgiri
Dundigal Gandimaisamma	Medchal-Malkajgiri

== Members of Legislative Assembly ==
Year	Member	Party
2009	Kuna Srisailam Goud	Independent politician
2014	K. P. Vivekanand Goud	Telugu Desam Party
2018	K. P. Vivekanand Goud	Telangana Rashtra Samithi
2023	K. P. Vivekanand Goud	Bharat Rashtra Samithi

== Election results ==
=== 2023 ===
2023 Telangana Legislative Assembly election: Quthbullapur
Party	Candidate	Votes	%	±%
BRS	K. P. Vivekanand Goud	187,999	46.80	▼6.59
BJP	Kuna Srisailam Goud	1,02,423	25.50	▲22.1
INC	Kolan Hanmanth Reddy	1,01,554	25.28	▼13.77
NOTA	None of the Above	4,079		
Majority		85,576	21.3	▲6.8
Turnout		4,01,667		
BRS hold		Swing		

=== 2018 ===
2018 Telangana Legislative Assembly election: Quthbullapur
Party	Candidate	Votes	%	±%
TRS	K. P. Vivekanand Goud	154,500	53.39%	▲14.4
INC	Kuna Srisailam Goud	1,13,000	39.05%	▲25.6
BJP	Sri Kasani Veeresh	9,833	3.4%	▲3.4
SFB	Ravipati Loka Vidya Sagar	3,045	1.05%	
NOTA	None of the Above	2,976	1.03%	
Majority		41,500	14.5%	▲1.0
Turnout		2,89,368	56.05%	▲7.1
BRS gain from TDP		Swing		

=== 2014 ===
2014 Telangana Legislative Assembly election: Quthbullapur
Party	Candidate	Votes	%	±%
TDP	KP Vivekananda	1,14,236	39.6	
TRS	Kolan Hanmanth Reddy	75,214	26.1	
INC	Kuna Srisailam Goud	40,199	13.9	
Majority		39,021	13.5	
Turnout		2,89,968	48.2	
TDP gain from Independent		Swing		

== See also ==
- Quthbullapur
- List of constituencies of Telangana Legislative Assembly
