= Praja Kutami =

Indian political pre-poll alliance

- Leader: N. Uttam Kumar Reddy; L. Ramana; Chada Venkat Reddy; M. Kodandaram
- Founded: 11 September 2018
- Dissolved: 23 January 2019
- Ideology: Secularism; Communism; Social liberalism Democratic socialism Social democracy
- Political position: Centre to far-left
- Colours: Sky blue
- Telangana Legislative Assembly: 21 / 119 (2018)

The Praja Kutami (transl. People's Alliance) or Maha Kutami (transl. Grand Alliance) was an electoral alliance between the Indian National Congress, Telugu Desam Party, Communist Party of India, and the Telangana Jana Samithi in the run-up to the 2018 Telangana Legislative Assembly election. It was formed on 11 September 2018 with the sole purpose of defeating the Telangana Rashtra Samithi in the polls that year. The party was seen as a major contender during the election campaign, however, the TRS managed to win a landslide victory and soundly defeated the alliance in the elections. On 23 January 2019, the alliance was called off when the Congress announced that it would contest all of the seats, both Lok Sabha and Vidhan Sabha, in the upcoming elections in Andhra Pradesh. Until then, there were talks about the alliance contesting together in the 2019 Andhra Pradesh Legislative Assembly and general elections.

The alliance was the first and only time the Congress and the TDP, once arch-rivals, teamed up together to defeat a common enemy. As such, throughout its existence, it was criticised as an 'unholy alliance' by the TRS and the BJP.

== Manifesto ==
The joint manifesto of the Praja Kutami was released on 26 November 2018.

Agriculture

1. ₹2 lakh (0.2 million) farm loan waiver for farmers.
2. Ensure MSP, stabilisation of crop prices and execution of irrigation projects.

Electricity

1. Free electricity to those consuming under 100 units of power.

Employment

1. All outsourcing employees will get revised pay on the basis of court order for ‘equal work and equal pay’.
2. 1 lakh government vacancies will be filled within the first year of government.
3. Job opportunities for Telangana workers seeking jobs in the Gulf.

Pension

1. Age limit for pensioners will be reduced from 60 to 58.
2. Unemployment allowance of ₹3,000 per individual.

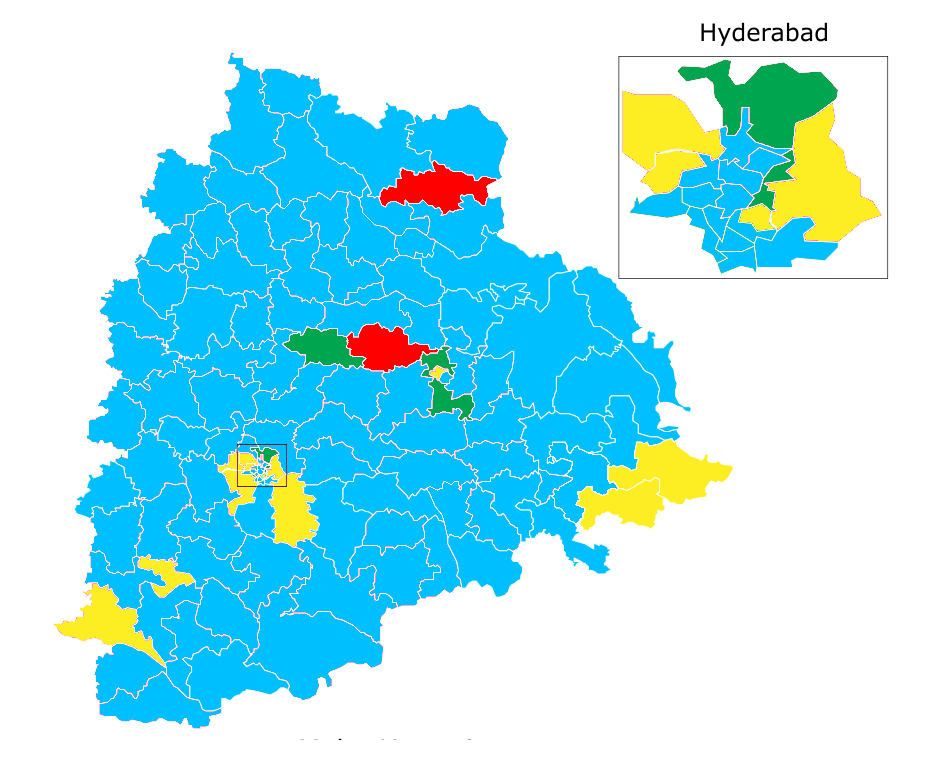
Seat sharing agreement between the constituent parties of Praja Kutami

== Constituent parties ==
Praja Kutami
Party	Flag	Symbol	Leader	Seats	Women	Seats Won	Vote Received	Vote %	Vote in Contested	Deposit
Indian National Congress			N. Uttam Kumar Reddy	95	11	18	56,88,933	27.49	34.53	5
Telugu Desam Party			L. Ramana	13	1	2	7,25,714	3.51	30.07	2
Communist Party of India			Chada Venkat Reddy	3	1	0	83,215	0.40	17.62	1
Telangana Jana Samithi			M. Kodandaram	4	1	0	83,088	0.40	11.87	3
Friendly Contest between Alliance				4	0	1	2,06,431	0.99	16.31	5
Total				119	14	21	67,87,381	32.79	31.82	16

== See also ==
- Maha Kutami (2009)
- Kutami (2024)
