= K. P. Vivekanand Goud =

Indian politician

Member of the Telangana Legislative Assembly
- Incumbent
- Assumed office 2014 - till
- Preceded by: Kuna Srisailam Goud
- Constituency: Quthbullapur Constituency

Personal details
- Born: 21 October 1977 (age 49) Quthbullapur
- Party: Bharat Rashtra Samithi
- Other political affiliations: Telugu Desam Party
- Spouse: Sowjanya
- Children: 2
- Occupation: Politician brs

K. P. Vivekanand Goud is an Indian politician who belonged to the TDP but now belongs to the Bharat Rashtra Samithi. He is an MLA from the Quthbullapur constituency of Medchal-Malkajgiri district in Telangana state. In the 2014 state assembly elections, he defeated K Hanmanth Reddy of BRS by a margin of 39,024 votes. In 2018 general elections he won with a majority of 40,000 plus votes on Congress candidate Kuna Srisailam Goud. In 2023 general elections he won with a majority of 85,576 votes on BJP Bharatiya Janatha Party candidate Kuna Srisailam Goud and later he was appointed BRS Party Whip in Telangana Legislative Assembly on 4 February 2025.

== Education ==
He did his schooling from H M T High School, HMT Colony, near Chintal. He completed his B.Eng. from Muffakham Jah College of Engineering and Technology affiliated with Osmania University.

== Political Journey ==
As he was connected to politics, which came from his father, he always wanted to serve the people and so he started a Cup Soucer Party after completing his BE and entered active politics in the year 2000. K. P. Vivekanand Goud won as MLA from TDP (Telugu Desam Party) under the leadership of Nara Chandrababu Naidu. He then jumped from TDP to BRS in the presence of CM K. Chandrashekar Rao.

Earlier, in October 2023, K. P. Vivekanand allegedly attacked ex MLA Kuna Srisailam Goud during a news TV debate. https://www.news18.com/elections/land-grabber-brs-mla-grabs-bjp-leader-by-neck-as-remark-sets-off-scuffle-during-live-tv-debate-8634434.html

Vivekananda contested the 2018 Assembly elections as TRS candidate and won by a margin of 41,500 votes and in 2023 Elections contested as BRS candidate and won by a huge margin of 85,576 votes. He currently represents the Quthbullapur Constituency of Telangana.

=== US Young Leaders Political Program ===
Shri K. P. Vivekanand Goud was one among the five and only from the Telangana State to represent India in the U.S. Young Leaders Political Program which was held in US.

==== Adarsh Yuva Vidhayak Puraskar ====
His well mannered educated behavior was recognized by the Bharathiya Chatra Sansad, Pune and he was awarded the Adarsh Yuva Vidhayak Puraskar for the year 2014 which is a matter of pride for Telangana State. This award was presented by the Hon’ble Speaker of Uttharakand State Legislative Assembly.
