= Makkan Singh Raj Thakur =

Indian politician (born 1971)

Member of the Telangana Legislative Assembly
- Incumbent
- Assumed office 2023

Personal details
- Party: Indian National Congress

Makkan Singh Raj Thakur (born 1971) is an Indian politician from Telangana state. He is an MLA from Ramagundam Assembly constituency in Peddapalli district. He represents Indian National Congress and won the 2023 Telangana Legislative Assembly election.

== Early life and education ==
Thakur is from Ramagundam, Peddapalli district. His father is Kishan Singh. He studied until class 12, and passed his Secondary School Certificate in 1983 at Zilla Parishad High School, Ramagundam.

== Career ==
Thakur won from Ramagundam Assembly constituency representing Indian National Congress in the 2023 Telangana Legislative Assembly election. He polled 92,227 votes and defeated his nearest rival, Korukanti Chandar Patel of Bharat Rashtra Samithi, by a huge margin of 56,794 votes.

Raj Thakur Was appointed as Peddapalli District Congress Committee (DCC) President on 22 November 2025.
