= Kuna Srisailam Goud =

Indian politician

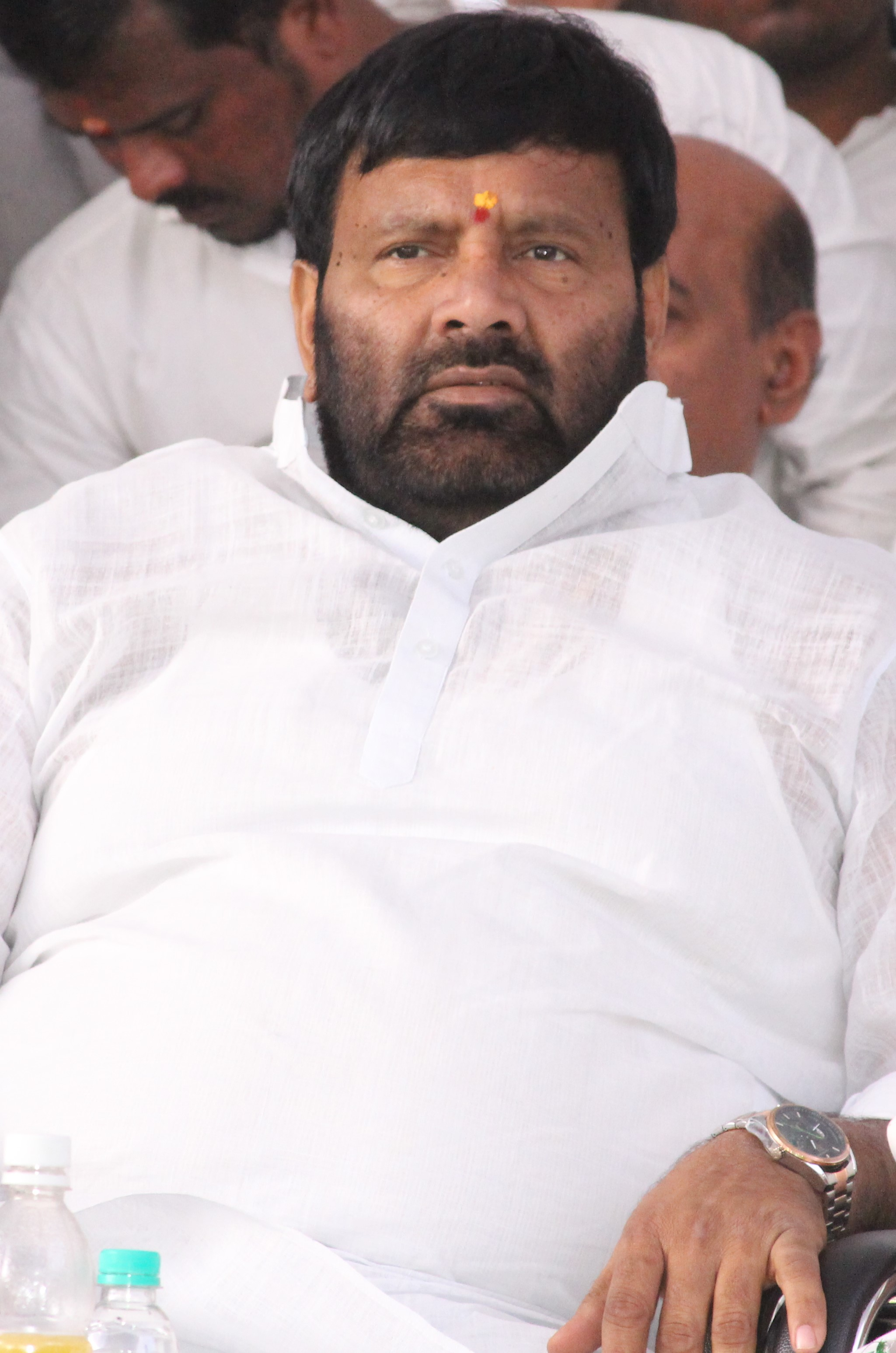

Member of the Andhra Pradesh Legislative Assembly
- In office 2009–2014
- Succeeded by: K. P. Vivekanand Goud
- Constituency: Quthbullapur

Personal details
- Born: 17 June 1966 (age 59) Gajularamaram, Hyderabad
- Party: Indian National Congress
- Other political affiliations: [(Indian National Congress)]
- Website: Official website

Kuna Srisailam Goud (born 17 June 1966) is an Indian politician affiliated with the Indian National Congress (INC). He served as the Telangana PCC (TPCC) and leader from 2009 to 2021. work has Dcc president Indian National Congress (INC) Earlier, he won a seat in the Legislative Assembly from Quthbullapur Constituency as an independent candidate and later joined the Congress in 2009. Known for his grassroots connect, he has been active in local development issues and party organization. His political journey reflects a shift from independent politics to a prominent role within the state Congress structure, focusing on constituency welfare and party growth initiatives across Telangana.

== Early life ==
Srisailam Goud is born to Kuna Krishna Goud and Kuna Mahalaxmi Goud in Gajula Ramaram village in the Quthbullapur Constituency of Medchal-Malkajgiri District, Telangana.

== Career ==
In 2009 he joined Indian National Congress party under the leadership of late YS Rajashekar Reddy. Earlier he was in active politics in the Youth Congress from 1992. He was elected as the MLA of Quthbullapur in 2009 as an independent in the undivided Andhra Pradesh assembly elections. He worked as Medchal District Congress Committee president before joining the BJP in 2021.

In 2023 Telangana Assembly Elections he lost the Quthbullapur seat to BRS candidate K. P. Vivekanand by 85,576 votes. Earlier, in October 2023, he was allegedly attacked by BRS KP Vivekanand during a news TV debate.

Kuna Srisailam Goud quit BJP and Joined Congress Party in the presence of All India Congress Committee (AICC) Telangana in-charge Deepa Dasmunsi and Chief Minister A Revanth Reddy on 5 April 2024 ahead of 2024 Lok Sabha elections.
