= Chada Venkat Reddy =

Indian politician

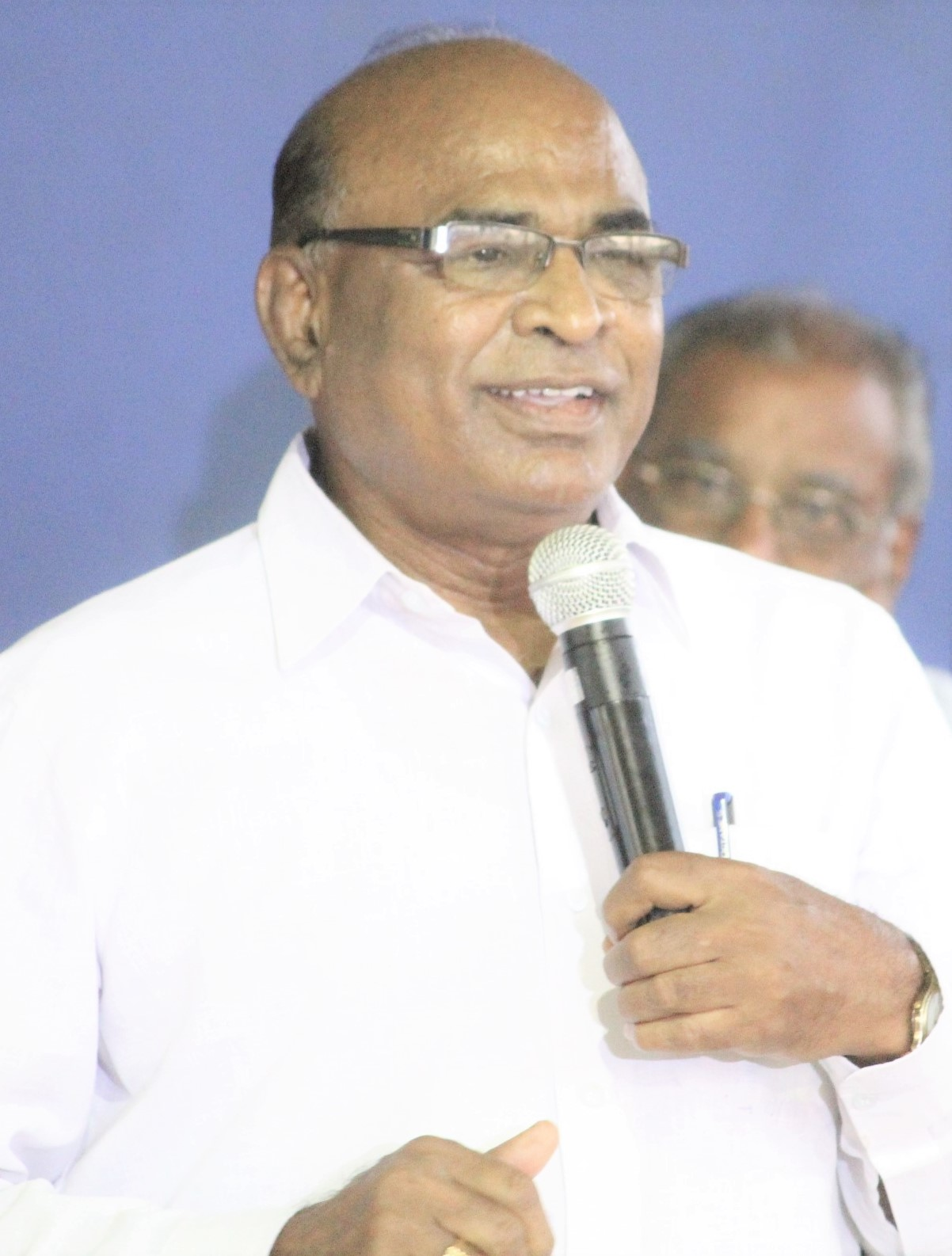

Secretary of the Communist Party of India, Telangana State Council
- In office 23 May 2014 – 08 September 2022
- Preceded by: Position created
- Succeeded by: Kunamneni Sambasiva Rao

Member of the Andhra Pradesh Legislative Assembly
- In office 11 May 2004 – 16 May 2009
- Preceded by: Bomma Venkateshwar
- Succeeded by: Constituency abolished
- Constituency: Indurthi

Personal details
- Born: 30 June 1950 (age 75)
- Party: Communist Party of India

Chada Venkat Reddy (born 30 June 1950) is an Indian politician and leader of Communist Party of India (CPI). He was elected as a member of Andhra Pradesh Legislative Assembly from Indurthi in 2004. He elected as First state secretary of CPI Telangana State Council in May 2014.
