= Telangana Jana Samithi =

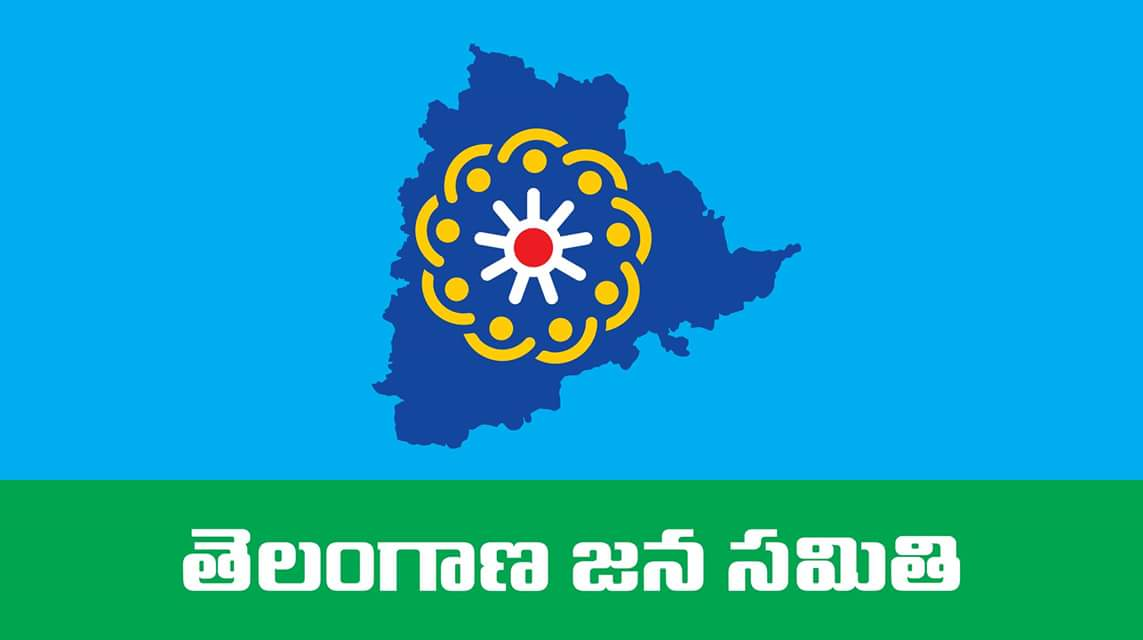
- Abbreviation: TJS
- President: M. Kodandaram
- Founder: M. Kodandaram
- Founded: 31 March 2018 (8 years ago)
- Headquarters: Door No. 7-1-215/E, Balkampet, Near Nature Cure Hospital, Hyderabad, Telangana, India
- Colours: Blue Green
- ECI status: Unrecognised Registered Party
- Alliance: Praja Kutami (2018)
- Seats in Telangana Legislative Council: 1 / 40

Website
- www.telanganajanasamithiparty.org

Telangana Jana Samithi, abbreviated as TJS, is an Indian regional political party predominantly based in the state of Telangana, India founded by Telangana activist, M. Kodandaram. He was also the chairman of all-party Telangana Joint Action Committee (T-JAC), which lead the separate Telangana state movement from 2009. He was a professor in Political Science at Osmania University.

== History ==
The party was formed on 31 March 2018 as a political alternative in Telangana.

Telangana Jana Samithi (TJS) was officially launched on 29 April 2018 at a public meeting held in Hyderabad. The Hindu stated "The new party would fight for alleviation of the plight of farmers, youth, women and other sections and would work for a change in governance rather than change in the individuals who were running the government."

With the aim to establish an alternate political system, Telangana Jana Samithi has announced that the party would not collect donations from large business establishments and corporate houses.

Attempting to set a new tradition in Telangana politics, TJS has invited educated youth who are willing to develop villages to apply to contest the ensuing Panchayat Raj polls as candidates. The pro forma of application form is available in the TJS website for aspiring Sarpanches as of 2018.
