= Mecha Nageswara Rao =

Indian politician

Mecha Nageswara Rao మెచ్చా నాగేశ్వరరావు

Member of Telangana Legislative Assembly
- In office 2018–2023
- Preceded by: Thati Venkateswarlu
- Succeeded by: Jare Adinarayana
- Constituency: Aswaraopeta

Personal details
- Born: India
- Party: Telangana Rashtra Samithi

Mecha Nageswara Rao is an Indian politician from Telangana and a member of the Telugu Desam Party. He is a member of the Telangana Legislative Assembly from Aswaraopeta. In April 2021 Mecha Nageswara Rao with another member of Telugu Desam Party joined the ruling Telangana Rashtra Samithi party in the Assembly.
