= M. Kodandaram =

Indian politician (born 1955)

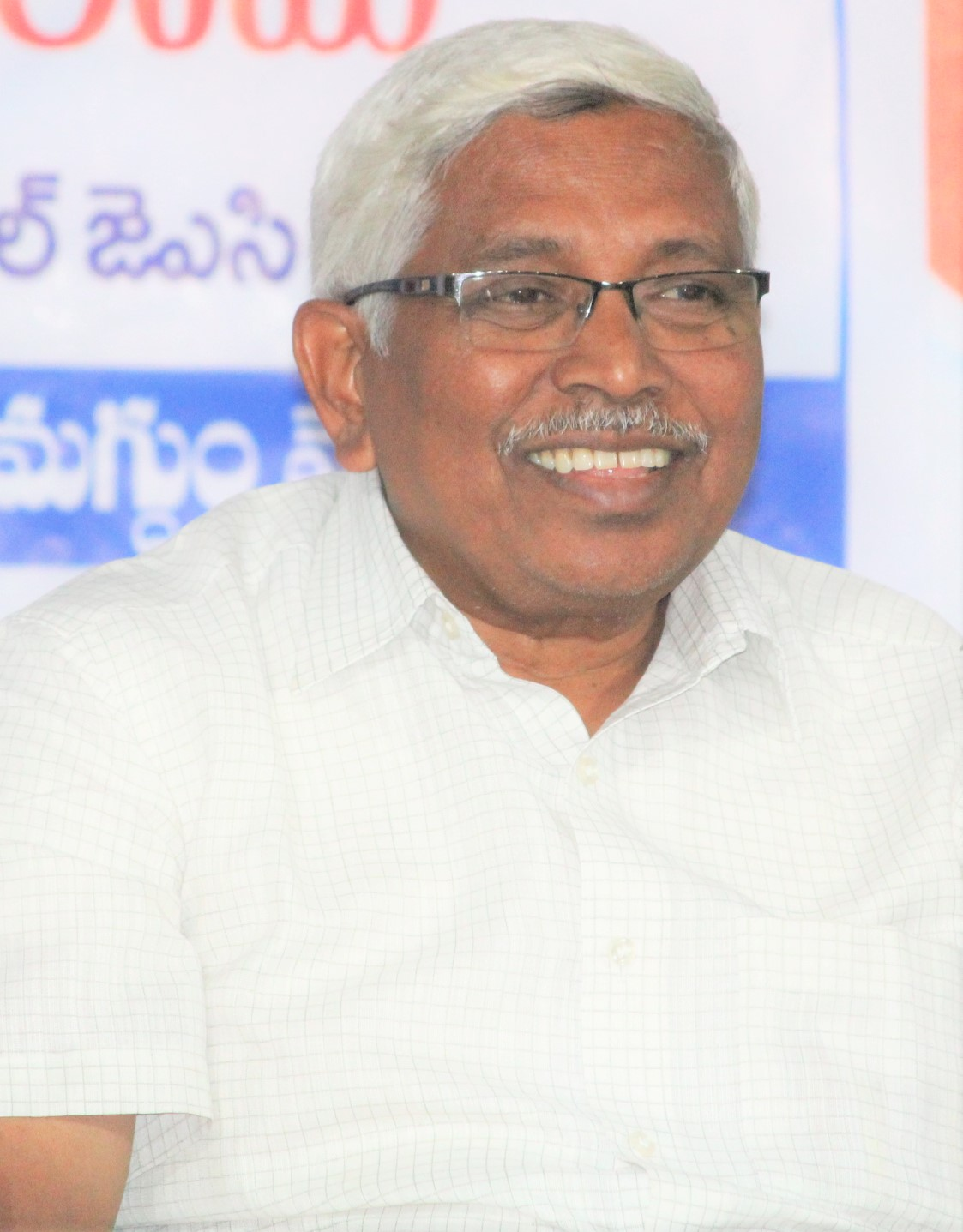
- Prof. Kodandaram

Member of Legislative Council Telangana
- In office 26 April 2026 – Incumbent
- In office 16 August 2024 – 13 August 2025
- Constituency: Nominated

Personal details
- Born: 5 September 1955 (age 71)
- Party: Telangana Jana Samithi
- Education: MA, M.Phil, PhD.
- Occupation: Professor (Rtd), Politician

Muddasani Kodandarama Reddy (born 5 September 1955) (popularly known as Prof. Kodandaram) is an Indian Activist, retired Professor (Retd., Political Science) and a Politician. He founded the political party Telangana Jana Samithi (TJS) in March 2018. He was also the Chairman of the Telangana Joint Action Committee (TJAC), which was formed with the goal of achieving a separate Telangana state. He retired as Professor of Political Science from Osmania University in Hyderabad. Prof. Kodandaram has been nominated as Member of Legislative Council (MLC) for Telangana Legislative Council under Governors quota in August 2024.

The Supreme Court on 13 August 2025 imposed a stay on the appointment of M. Kodandaram as Member of the Telangana Legislative Council (MLC) under the Governor’s quota.

The Cabinet had recommended Mohammad Azharuddin and Prof M. Kodandaram names for MLC seats under the Governor’s quota on 30 August 2025 following the Supreme Court’s decision striking down the previous appointments of Prof. Kodandaram and journalist Amer Ali Khan. Governor Shiv Pratap Shukla has approved the long-pending MLC nominations on 25 April 2026.

== Early life ==
Muddasani Kodandaram was born on 5 September 1955 to M. Venkatamma and M. Janardhan Reddy, a farmer from Nennel, Bellampalle in the state of Telangana. His birthday coincides with Teacher's Day in India. He has five sisters and a brother. He is married to Muddasani Susheela.

=== Telangana movement ===
Over the past 35 years, Prof. Kodandaram has founded and worked with many organizations that have laid the foundation for the creation of the state of Telangana. Some notable organizations and events he was a part of were Andhra Pradesh Civil Liberties Committee (APCLC), Human Rights Forum (HRF), Center for World Solidarity (CWS), World Social Forum and Telangana Vidyavanthula Vedika (TVV). He was also appointed as Advisor to Commissioner of Supreme Court where he worked on food security issue in India. He was also an activist on Polavaram displacement issues in Godavari District of Andhra Pradesh, India. Prof. Kodandaram was responsible for High Court issuing a stay order to State Government to temporarily halt the Polavaram project. He directly worked with many prominent Telangana activists including late Prof. Jaya Shankar. As TVV was instrumental in uniting all organizations and laying foundation for separate Telangana movement, its key member, Prof. Kodandaram, was ideal to lead the Telangana Joint Action Committee (TJAC). TJAC, formed in December 2009 with Prof. Kodandaram as its convener went on to unite all political and non-political organizations under one roof and was responsible for creation of Telangana. During Telangana movement, TJAC was responsible for some of the biggest political gatherings in history with successful programs like Sahaya Nirakarana, Million March, Vanta Vaarpu, Sakala Janula Samme, Sagara Haaram and Chal Main Hyderabad.

== Telangana Jana Samithi ==
He started his political party, TJS Telangana Jana Samithi in March 2018

== Awards ==
- World Peace Festival Award 2014 (Shanti Dootha Award).
