= Somarapu Satyanarayana =

Indian politician

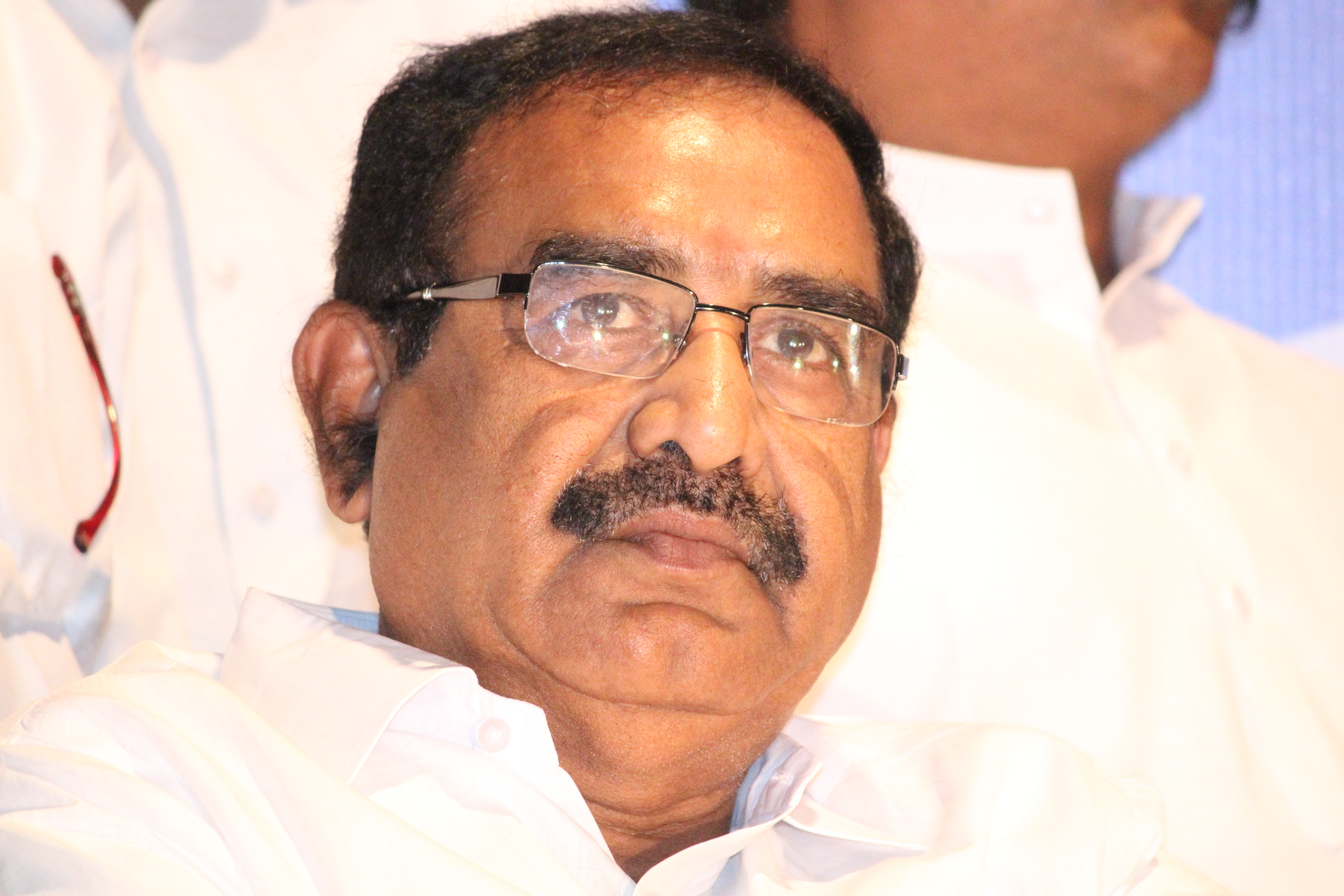

EX MLA,TS RTC chairman
- In office 2009-2018
- Constituency: Ramagundam

Personal details
- Born: 16-07-1948 Manthani, Telangana
- Party: Independent

Somarapu Satyanarayana is an Indian politician and former Member of Legislative Assembly & TS RTC chairman in Telangana.

== Early life ==
Somarapu Satyanarayana was born in Manthani, Karimnagar district (Present in Peddapalli district), Telangana, India.

== Career ==
He is District President for Peddapalli BJP and he was elected independently to Ramagundam constituency in erstwhile Karimnagar district in Telangana. He supported Congress party but withdrew his support and joined Telangana Rashtra Samithi on 30 October 2011. After losing 2018 Assembly elections he resigned from TRS party and joined BJP.
