= List of mandals in Telangana =

Mandals of Telangana
- Mandal
- Country: India
- State: Telangana
- Mandals: 614

Government
  - Type: Mandal Revenue
  - Body: Mandal Parishad

The table lists all the mandals in the 33 districts of Telangana. The state comprises 612 mandals.

Each mandal is administered by a mandal revenue officer, and consists several revenue villages.

== List of Mandals in Telangana ==
Mandal Name	District
Adilabad Rural; Adilabad Urban; Bazarhatnoor; Bela; Boath; Bheempoor; Gudihathnur; Ichoda; Jainad; Mavala; Neradigonda; Sirikonda; Talamadagu; Tamsi	Adilabad
Gadiguda; Inderavelly; Narnoor; Utnoor	Adilabad
Allapalli; Annapureddypally; Aswaraopeta; Chandrugonda; Chunchupally; Dammapeta; Gundala; Julurpad; Kothagudem; Laxmidevipalli; Mulakalapalle; Palvancha; Sujathanagar; Tekulapalle; Yellandu	Bhadradri Kothagudem
Aswapuram; Bhadrachalam; Cherla; Burgampahad; Dummugudem; Karakagudem; Manuguru; Pinapaka	Bhadradri Kothagudem
Bheemadevarapalle; Dharmasagar; Elkathurthy; Hanamkonda; Hasanparthy; Inavole; Kamalapur; Kazipet; Velair	Hanamkonda
Atmakur; Damera; Nadikuda; Parkal; Shayampet	Hanamkonda
Amberpet; Asif Nagar; Bahadurpura; Bandlaguda; Charminar; Golkonda; Himayathnagar; Nampally; Saidabad	Hyderabad
Ameerpet; Khairtabad; Maredpally; Musheerabad; Secunderabad; Shaikpet; Tirumalgiri	Hyderabad
Beerpur; Buggaram; Dharmapuri; Gollapalle; Jagtial; Jagtial Rural; Kodimial; Mallial; Pegadapalle; Raikal; Sarangapur; Velgatoor	Jagtial
Ibrahimpatnam; Mallapur; Metpalli	Jagtial
Kathlapur; Korutla; Medipalle	Jagtial
Bachannapeta; Devaruppala; Jangaon; Lingalaghanpur; Narmetta; Raghunathapalle; Tharigoppula	Jangaon
Chilpur; Kodakandla; Palakurthi; Station Ghanpur; Zaffergadh	Jangaon
Bhupalpalle; Chityal; Ghanpur; Kataram; Mahadevpur; Maha Mutharam; Malharrao; Mogullapalle; Palimela; Regonda; Tekumatla	Jayashankar Bhupalapally
Kaloor_Timmanadoddi; Dharur; Gadwal; Itikyal; Maldakal; Ghattu; Aiza; Rajoli; Waddepalle; Manopad; Undavelli; Alampur	Jogulamba Gadwal
Banswada; Bichkunda; Birkoor; Jukkal; Madnur; Nasurullabad; Nizamsagar; Pedda Kodapgal; Pitlam; Dongli	Kamareddy
Bhiknoor; Bibipet; Domakonda; Kamareddy; Machareddy; Rajampet; Ramareddy; Sadasivanagar; Tadwai; Palvancha	Kamareddy
Gandhari; Lingampet; Naga Reddipet; Yellareddy	Kamareddy
Chigurumamidi; Choppadandi; Gangadhara; Ganneruvaram; Karimnagar; Karimnagar (Rural-I); Karimnagar (Rural-II); Manakondur; Ramadugu; Thimmapur	Karimnagar
Ellandakunta; Huzurabad; Jammikunta; Shankarapatnam; V_Saidapur; Veenavanka	Karimnagar
Enkuru; Kalluru; Penuballi; Sathupalli; Thallada; Vemsoor	Khammam
Bonakal; Chinthakani; Kamepalle; Khammam_Rural; Khammam_Urban; Konijerla; Kusumanchi; Madhira; Mudigonda; Nelakondapalle; Raghunadhapalem; Singareni; Thirumalayapalem; Wyra; Yerrupalem	Khammam
Asifabad; Jainoor; Kerameri; Lingapur; Rebbena; Sirpur_U; Tiryani; Wankidi	Kumuram Bheem Asifabad
Bejjur; Chintalamanepally; Dahegaon; Kagaznagar; Kouthala; Penchikalpet; Sirpur_T	Kumuram Bheem Asifabad
Bayyaram; Dornakal; Ganagavaram; Garla; Gudur; Kesamudram; Kothaguda; Kuravi; Mahabubabad; Seerole; Inugurthy	Mahabubabad
Chinnagudur; Danthalapalle; Maripeda; Narsimhulapet; Nellikudur; Peddavangara; Thorrur	Mahabubabad
Addakal; Balanagar; Bhoothpur; Chinna_Chintha_Kunta; Devarkadara; Gandeed; Hanwada; Jadcherla; Koilkonda; Mahabubnagar_Rural; Mahabubnagar_Urban; Midjil; Mohammadabad; Musapet; Nawabpet; Rajapur	Mahabubnagar
Bheemaram; Chennur; Dandepally; Hajipur; Jaipur; Jannaram; Kotapally; Luxettipet; Mancherial; Mandamarri; Naspur	Mancherial
Bellampally Mandal; Bheemini; Kannepally; Kasipet; Nennel; Tandur; Vempally	Mancherial
Alladurg; Havelighanpur; Medak; Nizampet; Papannapet; Ramayampet; Regode; Shankarampet_A; Shankarampet_R; Tekmal	Medak
Chilipched; Kowdipalle; Kulcharam; Narsapur; Shivampet	Medak
Chegunta; Manoharabad; Masaipet; Narsingi; Tupran; Yeldurthy	Medak
Alwal; Bachupally; Balanagar; Dundigal Gandimaisamma; Kukatpally; Malkajgiri; Quthbullapur	Medchal-Malkajgiri
Ghatkesar; Kapra; Keesara; Medchal; Medipally, Telangana; Muduchintalpalli; Shamirpet; Uppal	Medchal-Malkajgiri
Eturnagaram; Govindaraopet; Kannaigudem; Mangapet; Mulugu; Sammakka Saralamma Tadvai; Venkatapur; Venkatapuram; Wazeed	Mulugu
Achampet; Amrabad; Balmoor; Lingal; Padra; Uppunuthala	Nagarukurnool
Charakonda; Kalwakurthy; Urkonda; Vangoor; Veldanda	Nagarukurnool
Kodair; Kollapur; Peddakothapalle; Pentlavelli	Nagarukurnool
Bijinapalle; Nagarkurnool; Tadoor; Telkapalle; Thimmajipeta	Nagarukurnool
Chandampet; Chinthapalle; Devarakonda; Gundlapalle; Gurrampode; Kondamallapally; Marriguda; Nampalle; Neredugommu; Pedda_adiserlapalle	Nalgonda
Adavi devula palli; Anumula_Haliya; Damaracherla; Madugulapally; Miryalaguda; Nidamanur; Peddavoora; Thripuraram; Tirumalagiri_Sagar; Vemulapalle	Nalgonda
Chandur; Chityala; Kangal; Kattangoor; Kethepalle; Munugode; Nakrekal; Narketpalle; Nalgonda; Saligouraram; Thipparthi	Nalgonda
Damaragidda; Dhanwada; Gundumal; Kosgi; Krishna; Kottha pally; Maddur; Maganoor; Makthal; Marikal; Narayanpet; Narva; Utkoor	Narayanpet
Basar; Bhainsa; Kubeer; Kuntala; Lokeshwaram; Mudhole; Tanoor	Nirmal
Dastuarabad; Dilawarpur; Kaddampeddur; Khanapur; Laxmanchanda; Mamada; Narsapur_G; Nirmal Rural; Nirmal Urban; Pembi; Sarangapur; Soan	Nirmal
Aloor; Armur; Balkonda; Bheemgal; Donkeshwar; Jakranpalle; Kammarpalle; Mendora; Mortad; Mupkal; Nandipet; Vailpur; Yergatla	Nizamabad
Bodhan; Chandur; Kotgiri; Pothangal; Mosra; Ranjal; Rudrur; Saloora; Varni; Yedapalle	Nizamabad
Dharpalle; Dharpalle; Dichpalle; Indalwai; Makloor; Mugpal; Navipet; Nizamabad_North; Nizamabad_Rural; Nizamabad_South; Sirkonda	Nizamabad
Kamanpur; Manthani; Mutharam; Ramagiri	Peddapalli
Anthergoan; Dharmaram; Elgaid; Julapalle; Palakurthy; Peddapalli; Ramagundam; Srirampur; Sultanabad; Odela	Peddapalli
Ellanthakunta; Gambhiraopeta; Mustabad; Sircilla; Thangallapalle; Veernapalle; Yellareddypeta	Rajanna Sircilla
Boinpalle; Chandurthi; Konaraopeta; Rudrangi; Vemulawada; Vemulawada_Rural	Rajanna Sircilla
Chevella; Moinabad; Shabad; Shankarpalle	Rangareddy
Abdullapurmet; Hayathnagar; Ibrahimpatnam; Madgul; Manchal; Yacharam	Rangareddy
Amangal; Balapur; Kadthal; Kandukur; Maheshwaram; Saroornagar; Talakonapally	Rangareddy
Gandipet; Rajendranagar; Serilingampally; Shamshabad	Rangareddy
Farooqnagar; Jilled Chowdergudem; Keshampeta; Kondurg; Kothur; Nandigam; Shadnagar	Rangareddy
Kalher; Kangti; Manoor; Nagilgidda; Narayankhed; Sirgapoor	Sangareddy
Ameenpur; Andole; Gummadidala; Hathnoora; Jinnaram; Kandi; Kondapur; Munipally; Patancheru; Pulkal; Ramchandrapuram; Sadasivpet; Sangareddy; Vatpally	Sangareddy
Jharasangam; Kohir; Mogudampally; Nyalkal; Raikode; Zaheerabad	Sangareddy
Dubbak; Siddipet (Rural); Chinnakodur; Nangnoor; Siddipet (Urban); Thoguta; Mirdoddi; Doulthabad; Komuravelli; Cherial; Narayanaraopet; Akberpet Bhoompally	Siddipet
Raipole; Wargal; Mulugu; Markook; Jagdevpur; Gajwel; Kondapak; Kukunoorpally	Siddipet
Akkannapet; Bejjanki; Dhoolmitta; Husnabad; Koheda; Maddur	Siddipet
Atmakur(s); Chivvemla; Jajireddygudem; Maddirala; Mothey; Nagaram; Nuthankal; Penpahad; Thirumalagiri; Thungathurthy; Suryapet	Suryapet
Ananthagiri; Chilkur; Kodad; Munagala; Nadigudem	Suryapet
Garidepally; Huzurnagar; Mallareddygudem; Mattampally; Mellachervu; Neredcherla; Palakeedu	Suryapet
Basheerabad; Bommaraspet; Doulthabad; Kodangal; Peddemul; Tandur; Yelal	Vikarabad
Bantwaram; Doma; Dharur; Kotepally; Kulkacherla; Marpalle; Mominpet; Nawabpet; Pargi; Pudur; Vikarabad	Vikarabad
Amarchinta; Atmakur; Chinnambavi; Ghanpur (Khilla); Gopalpeta; Kothakota; Madanapur; Pangal; Pebbair; Peddamandadi; Revally; Srirangapur; Veepanagandla; Wanaparthy	Wanaparthy
Geesugonda; Khila Warangal; Parvathagiri; Rayaparthy; Wardhannapet; Warangal; Sangem	Warangal
Chennaraopet; Duggondi; Khanapur; Nallabelly; Narsampet; Nekkonda	Warangal
Addaguduru; Alair; Atmakur (M); Bibinagar; Bhongir; Bommalaramaram; Gundala; Motakondur; Mothkur; Rajapet; Turkapally; Yadagirigutta	Yadadri Bhuvanagiri
Bhoodan Pochampally; Choutuppal; Narayanpur; Ramannapet; Valigonda	Yadadri Bhuvanagiri

Note: Bhurgampadu, Chintoor, Kukunoor, Kunavaram, Nellipaka, Vara Ramachandra Puram and Velerupadu mandals of the district were transferred to Andhra Pradesh.

== See also ==
- List of districts of Telangana
