= Pargi Assembly constituency =

Constituency of the Telangana legislative assembly in India

Coordinates: 17.17°N 77.88°E

Pargi
- Constituency No. 54 for the Telangana Legislative Assembly
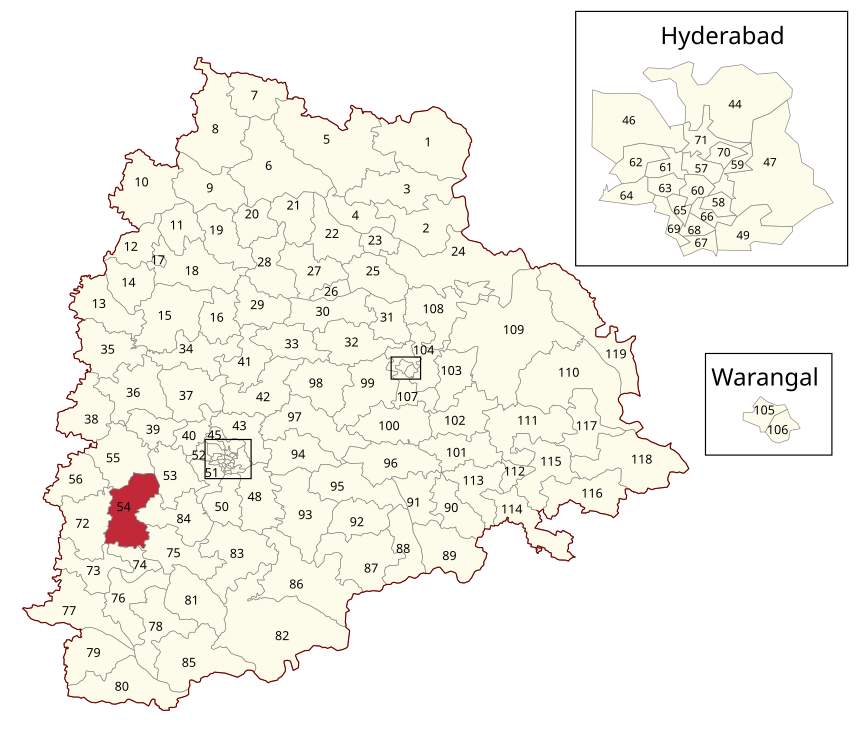
- Location of Pargi Assembly constituency within Telangana

Constituency details
- Country: India
- Region: South India
- State: Telangana
- District: Ranga Reddy
- Lok Sabha constituency: Chevella
- Established: 1951
- Total electors: 2,11,810
- Reservation: None

Member of Legislative Assembly
- 3rd Telangana Legislative Assembly
- Incumbent Tammannagari Ram Mohan Reddy
- Party: INC
- Elected year: 2023

Pargi Assembly constituency is a constituency of Telangana Legislative Assembly, India. It is one of the constituencies in Ranga Reddy district. It is part of Chevella Lok Sabha constituency.

T Ram Mohan Reddy of Indian National Congress represents the constituency from 2014 to 2018. In the recent elections, Koppula Mahesh Reddy of Telangana Rashtra Samithi won the elections and represents the constituency.

== Mandals ==
The Assembly Constituency presently comprises the following Mandals

Mandal	Districts
Pargi	Vikarabad
Domah	Vikarabad
Kulkacharla	Vikarabad
Pudur	Vikarabad
Chowdapur	Vikarabad
Mahmoodabad	Mahabubnagar
Gandeed	Mahabubnagar

== List of Member of Legislative Assembly ==
Year	Member Name	Political Party
2023	T. Ram Mohan Reddy	Indian National Congress
2018	Koppula Mahesh Reddy	Telangana Rashtra Samithi
2014	T. Ram Mohan Reddy	Indian National Congress
2009	Koppula Harsihwar Reddy	Telugu Desam Party
2004	Koppula Harsihwar Reddy	Telugu Desam Party
1999	Koppula Harsihwar Reddy	Telugu Desam Party
1994	Koppula Harsihwar Reddy	Telugu Desam Party
1989	Kamatam Ram Reddy	Indian National Congress
1985	Koppula Harsihwar Reddy	Telugu Desam Party
1983	Ahmed Shareef	Indian National Congress
1978	Ahmed Shareef	Indian National Congress
1972	Kamatam Ram Reddy	Indian National Congress
1967	R. Reddy	Independent politician
1962	M. Rama Deva Reddy	Indian National Congress
1957	Jagan Mohan Reddy	Independent politician
1952	Shah Jehan Begum	Indian National Congress

== Election results ==
=== Telangana Legislative Assembly election, 2023 ===
Telangana Assembly Elections, 2023: Pargi (Assembly constituency)
Party	Candidate	Votes	%	±%
INC	T. Ram Mohan Reddy	98,536	48.93	
BRS	Koppula Mahesh Reddy	74,523	37.01	
BJP	Booneti Maruthi Kiran	16,653	8.27	
Alliance of Democratic Reforms Party	Mahesh Reddy Bareddy	2,182	1.08	
BSP	E Anandam	2,151	1.07	
Independent	Mukunda Nageshwar	1,396	0.69	
NOTA	None of the Above	1,124	0.56	
Majority		24,013	17.92	
Turnout		2,01,380		
INC gain from BRS		Swing		

=== Telangana Legislative Assembly election, 2018 ===
2018 Telangana Legislative Assembly election: Pargi
Party	Candidate	Votes	%	±%
TRS	Koppula Mahesh Reddy	83,471	47.60	
INC	T. Ram Mohan Reddy	67,631	38.56	
SFB	K Mallesham	8,694	4.96	
BJP	K Prahalad Rao	6,743	3.84	
NOTA	None of the Above	1,381	0.79	
Majority		15,840		
Turnout		1,75,371	76.44	
TRS gain from INC		Swing		

=== Telangana Legislative Assembly election, 2014 ===
Telangana Assembly Elections, 2014: Pargi (Assembly constituency)
Party	Candidate	Votes	%	±%
INC	T. Ram Mohan Reddy	68,098	45.7%	
TRS	Koppula Harishwar Reddy	62,935	42.3%	
BJP	Kamatham Ram Reddy	13,355	9.0%	
Majority		5,163		
Turnout		1,50,178	70.9%	
INC gain from TDP		Swing		

== See also ==
- List of constituencies of Telangana Legislative Assembly
- Pargi
