= Tandur Assembly constituency =

Constituency of the Telangana legislative assembly in India

Coordinates: 17.26°N 77.59°E

Tandur
- Constituency No. 56 for the Telangana Legislative Assembly
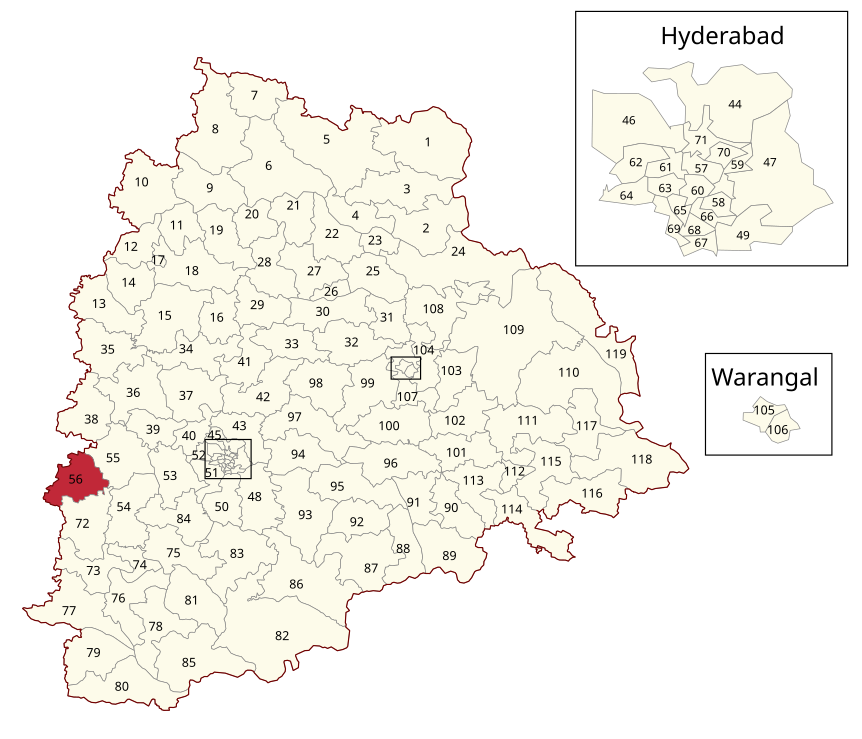
- Location of Tandur Assembly constituency within Telangana

Constituency details
- Country: India
- Region: South India
- State: Telangana
- District: Vikarabad
- Lok Sabha constituency: Chevella
- Established: 1962
- Total electors: 1,89,183
- Reservation: None

Member of Legislative Assembly
- 3rd Telangana Legislative Assembly
- Incumbent Buyyani Manohar Reddy
- Party: INC
- Elected year: 2023

Tandur Assembly Constituency is a constituency of the Telangana Legislative Assembly. It is one of the four constituencies in Vikarabad district. It is part of Chevella Lok Sabha constituency.

Patnam Mahender Reddy, the former Transport Minister of Telangana, represented the constituency from 2014 to 2018.

P. Rohith Reddy was elected as the MLA on a Congress ticket in the assembly elections held in December 2018. On 6 June 2019, he defected to Telangana Rashtra Samithi party.

Buyyani Manohar Reddy is currently representing Tandur Assembly constituency.

== Mandals ==
The assembly constituency presently comprises the following mandals

Mandal
Tandur
Peddemul
Basheerabad
Yalal

== Members of Legislative Assembly ==
Duration	Member	Political party
Andhra Pradesh
1962–67	Marri Chenna Reddy	Indian National Congress
1967–72	Marri Chenna Reddy	Indian National Congress
1972–78	M. Manik Rao	Indian National Congress
1978–83	M. Manik Rao	Indian National Congress
1983–85	M. Manik Rao	Indian National Congress
1985–89	M. Chandra Sekhar	Indian National Congress
1989–94	M. Chandra Sekhar	Indian National Congress
1994–99	P. Mahender Reddy	Telugu Desam Party
1999–04	P. Mahender Reddy	Telugu Desam Party
2004–09	Malkud Narayan Rao	Indian National Congress
2009–14	P. Mahender Reddy	Telugu Desam Party
Telangana
2014–2018	P. Mahender Reddy	Telangana Rashtra Samithi
2018–2023	Pilot Rohith Reddy	Indian National Congress
2023-Incumbent	Buyyani Manohar Reddy	Indian National Congress

== Election results ==
=== Telangana Legislative Assembly election, 2023 ===
Telangana Assembly Elections, 2023: Tandur (Assembly constituency)
Party	Candidate	Votes	%	±%
INC	B.Manohar Reddy	84,662	48.32	
BRS	Pilot Rohith Reddy	78,079	44.56	
JSP	N. Shankar Goud	2,087	1.93	
NOTA	None of the Above	592	0.34	
Majority		6583		
Turnout		1,75,225		
INC hold		Swing		

=== Telangana Legislative Assembly election, 2018 ===
Telangana Assembly Elections, 2018: Tandur (Assembly constituency)
Party	Candidate	Votes	%	±%
INC	Pilot Rohith Reddy	70,428	45.02	
TRS	Patnam Mahender Reddy	67,553	43.18	
BJP	Patel RaviShanker	10,548	6.74	
Samajwadi Forward Bloc	P. Mahendar Reddy	2,608	1.67	
BSP	B. Chandra Shekar Mudiraj	1,182	0.76	
NOTA	None of the Above	787	0.50	
Majority		2,875	1.84	
Turnout		1,56,436	77.48	
INC gain from TRS		Swing		

=== Telangana Legislative Assembly election, 2014 ===
Telangana Assembly Elections, 2014: Tandur (Assembly constituency)
Party	Candidate	Votes	%	±%
TRS	Patnam Mahender Reddy	61,293	45.97	
INC	Malkud Narayan Rao	45,219	33.92	
TDP	M Naresh	11,362	8.52	
Independent	Sri Gopal	4,503	3.38	
YSRCP	M. Prabhu Kumar	4,327	3.25	
BSP	Chittempally Balaiah	3,151	2.36	
NOTA	None of the Above	1,327	1.00	
Majority		16,074	12.05	
Turnout		1,33,324	70.46	
TRS gain from TDP		Swing		

== See also ==
- Tandur
- List of constituencies of Telangana Legislative Assembly
