= Ananthagiri =

Ananthagiri may refer to:

- Ananthagiri, Ranga Reddy district, Telangana, India
- Ananthagiri, Suryapet district, Telangana, India
- Ananthagiri, Vishakapatnam district, Andhra Pradesh, India
- Ananthagiri Hills, Vikarabad district, Telangana, India
