= Kodangal Assembly constituency =

Constituency of the Telangana legislative Assembly, India

Coordinates: 17.11°N 77.62°E

Kodangal
- Constituency No. 72 for the Telangana Legislative Assembly
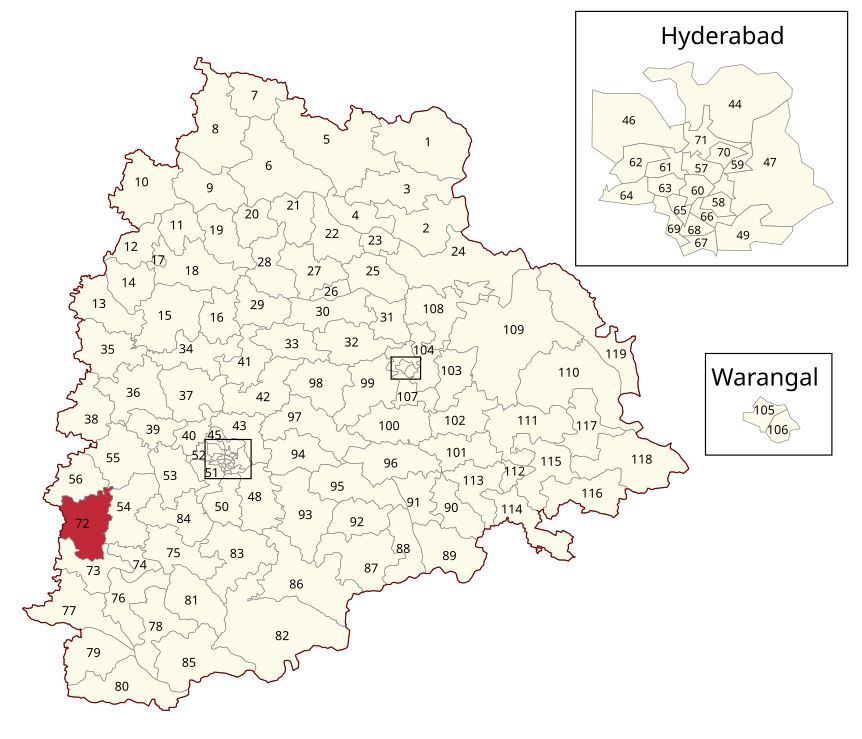
- Location of Kodangal Assembly constituency within Telangana

Constituency details
- Country: India
- Region: South India
- State: Telangana
- District: Vikarabad (partially); Narayanapet (partially)
- Lok Sabha constituency: Mahabubnagar
- Established: 1951
- Total electors: 138,300
- Reservation: None

Member of Legislative Assembly
- 3rd Telangana Legislative Assembly
- Incumbent Anumula Revanth Reddy; Chief Minister of Telangana
- Party: INC
- Elected year: 2023

Kodangal Assembly constituency is a constituency partially in Vikarabad district and Narayanpet district of Telangana that elects representatives to the Telangana Legislative Assembly in India. It is one of the seven assembly segments of Mahabubnagar Lok Sabha constituency.

Anumula Revanth Reddy is the current MLA from the constituency and has been serving as the second Chief Minister of Telangana since winning the 2023 Telangana Legislative Assembly election as a candidate of the Indian National Congress.

== Mandals ==
The Assembly Constituency presently comprises the following Mandals:-

Mandal	Districts
Kodangal	Vikarabad district
Bomraspeta	Vikarabad district
Dudyal	Vikarabad district
Doultabad	Vikarabad district
Kosgi	Narayanpet district
Maddur	Narayanpet district
Gundumal	Narayanpet district
Kothapalli	Narayanpet district

== Members of Legislative Assembly ==
Members of Legislative State Assembly, who represented Kodangal.

Year	MLA	Political party
Hyderabad State
1952	Anant Reddy Veeraswami (Gen)	Indian National Congress
1952	Veeraswamy, Banam (Res)	Indian National Congress
United Andhra Pradesh
1957	Achuta Reddy	Indian National Congress
1962	Rukma Reddy	Independent
1967	K. Achyutha Reddy	Indian National Congress
1972	Nandharam Venkataiah	Independent
1978	Gurunath Reddy	Independent
1983	Gurunath Reddy	Indian National Congress
1985	Nandharam Venkataiah	Telugu Desam Party
1989	Gurunath Reddy	Indian National Congress
1994	Nandharam Venkataiah	Telugu Desam Party
1996★	N. Surya Narayana	Telugu Desam Party
1999	Gurunath Reddy	Indian National Congress
2004	Gurunath Reddy	Indian National Congress
2009	Anumula Revanth Reddy	Telugu Desam Party
Telangana Legislative Assembly
2014	Anumula Revanth Reddy	Telugu Desam Party
2018	Patnam Narender Reddy	Bharat Rashtra Samithi
2023	Anumula Revanth Reddy	Indian National Congress

★by-election

- In 1951 the state name was Hyderabad. It was changed to Andhra Pradesh after the States Reorganisation Act of 1956 and the 2014 elections were held in Telangana.

== Election results ==
Vote share of Winning candidates
2023	55.05%
2018	48.78%
2014	39.06%
2009	46.45%
2004	52.55%
1999	55.30%
1996 by-poll	0.00%
1994	55.17%
1989	56.37%
1985	54.81%
1983	48.84%
1978	36.86%
1972	38.13%
1967	61.60%
1962	52.00%
1957	47.16%
1952	79.91%

=== 2023 ===
2023 Telangana Legislative Assembly election: Kodangal
Party	Candidate	Votes	%	±%
INC	Anumula Revanth Reddy	107,429	55.05	
BRS	Patnam Narender Reddy	74,897	38.38	
BJP	Bantu Ramesh	3,988	2.04	
IND	M. Madhusudhan Reddy	2,173	1.11	
BSP	Kurva Narmada Kistappa	2,133	1.09	
NOTA	None of the Above	2,002	1.03	
Majority		32,532	16.67	
Turnout		195,163		
Swing to INC from TRS		Swing		

=== 2018 ===
2018 Telangana Legislative Assembly election: Kodangal
Party	Candidate	Votes	%	±%
TRS	Patnam Narender Reddy	80,754	48.78	
INC	Anumula Revanth Reddy	71,435	43.15	
IND	Purra Balakishore	4,171	2.52	
BJP	Nagurao Namaji	2,624	1.58	
NOTA	None of the Above	1,472	0.89	
Majority		9,319	5.63	
Turnout		165,559	81.98	
Swing to TRS from TDP		Swing		

=== 2014 ===
2014 Telangana Legislative Assembly election: Kodangal
Party	Candidate	Votes	%	±%
TDP	Anumula Revanth Reddy	54,026	39.06	
TRS	Gurunath Reddy	39,412	28.50	
INC	D. Vittal Rao	36,304	26.25	
IND	Lingam Chinna Sayappa	3,835	2.77	
NOTA	None of the Above	1,136	0.82	
Majority		14,614	10.56	
Turnout		138,300	69.97	
TDP hold		Swing		

=== 2009 ===
2009 Andhra Pradesh Legislative Assembly election: Kodangal
Party	Candidate	Votes	%	±%
TDP	Anumula Revanth Reddy	61,685	46.45	
INC	Gurunath Reddy	54,696	41.19	
BJP	Ananth Ramchander Sivakuri	3,172	2.39	
Majority		6,989	5.26	
Turnout		132,789		
Swing to TDP from INC		Swing		

=== 2004 ===
2004 Andhra Pradesh Legislative Assembly election: Kodangal
Party	Candidate	Votes	%	±%
INC	Gurunath Reddy	61,452	52.55	
TDP	N. M. Anuradha	55,487	47.45	
Majority		5,965	5.10	
Turnout		116,939		
INC hold		Swing		

=== 1999 ===
1999 Andhra Pradesh Legislative Assembly election: Kodangal
Party	Candidate	Votes	%	±%
INC	Gurnath Reddy	59,624	55.30	
TDP	D. Sharada	45,922	42.59	
IND	Nandaram Mididoddi Suryanarayana	2,278	2.11	
Majority		13,702	12.71	
Turnout		112,334	69.80	
Swing to INC from TDP		Swing		

=== 1994 ===
1994 Andhra Pradesh Legislative Assembly election: Kodangal
Party	Candidate	Votes	%	±%
TDP	Nandaram Venkataiah	55,881	55.17	
INC	Gurunath Reddy	39,438	38.94	
BJP	Punnamchand Lahoti	5,048	4.98	
SP	Qureshi	354	0.35	
IND	K. Bheemaiah	328	0.32	
IND	Mohd. Yasin Ali	120	0.12	
IND	Ashappa	119	0.12	
Majority		16,443	16.23	
Turnout		104,144	72.12	
Swing to TDP from INC		Swing		

=== 1989 ===
1989 Andhra Pradesh Legislative Assembly election: Kodangal
Party	Candidate	Votes	%	±%
INC	Gurnath Reddy	52,314	56.37	
TDP	Ratanlal Lahoti	31,729	34.19	
IND	M. E. Mazher Hussain	4,363	4.70	
JP	S. J. Qureshi	1,724	1.86	
IND	G. Narsimlu	1,365	1.47	
IND	A. Balaraju	887	0.96	
IND	Bheemaiah	425	0.46	
Majority		20,585	22.18	
Turnout		98,703	71.59	
Swing to INC from TDP		Swing		

=== 1985 ===
1985 Andhra Pradesh Legislative Assembly election: Kodangal
Party	Candidate	Votes	%	±%
TDP	N. Venkataiah	42,531	54.81	
INC	Gurunath Reddy	31,917	41.13	
IND	Venkataiah	893	1.15	
IND	Bheemaiah	836	1.08	
IND	Mohammad Ali	566	0.73	
IND	Anandam	322	0.41	
IND	Karant Bamulu	308	0.40	
IND	Krishnaiah	218	0.28	
Majority		10,614	13.68	
Turnout		79,509	67.45	
Swing to TDP from INC		Swing		

=== 1983 ===
1983 Andhra Pradesh Legislative Assembly election: Kodangal
Party	Candidate	Votes	%	±%
INC	Gurunath Reddy	33,820	48.84	
IND	Nandaram Venkataiah	30,456	43.98	
IND	Kishtappa	4,972	7.18	
Majority		3,364	4.86	
Turnout		71,454	69.86	
Swing to INC from Independent		Swing		

=== 1978 ===
1978 Andhra Pradesh Legislative Assembly election: Kodangal
Party	Candidate	Votes	%	±%
IND	Gurunath Reddy	22,936	36.86	
INC(I)	Chinna Veeranna (Puli)	19,213	30.88	
INC	Nandaram Venkataiah	17,917	28.80	
JP	Mohd. Khaleelur Rahman	2,156	3.47	
Majority		3,723	5.98	
Turnout		64,791	66.68	
Independent hold		Swing		

=== 1972 ===
1972 Andhra Pradesh Legislative Assembly election: Kodangal
Party	Candidate	Votes	%	±%
IND	Nandaram Venkataiah	16,432	38.13	
IND	K. Srinivas Reddy	14,599	33.88	
INC	Veeranna	12,062	27.99	
Majority		1,833	4.25	
Turnout		45,393	48.41	
Swing to Independent from INC		Swing		

=== 1967 ===
1967 Andhra Pradesh Legislative Assembly election: Kodangal
Party	Candidate	Votes	%	±%
INC	K. A. Reddy	23,865	61.60	
IND	M. Reddy	14,880	38.40	
Majority		8,985	23.20	
Turnout		40,450	51.55	
Swing to INC from SWA		Swing		

=== 1962 ===
1962 Andhra Pradesh Legislative Assembly election: Kodangal
Party	Candidate	Votes	%	±%
SWA	Rukma Reddy	13,028	52.00	
INC	K. Achuta Reddy	12,028	48.00	
Majority		1,000	4.00	
Turnout		26,059	44.75	
Swing to SWA from INC		Swing		

=== 1957 ===
1957 Andhra Pradesh Legislative Assembly election: Kodangal
Party	Candidate	Votes	%	±%
INC	Achuta Reddy	9,502	47.16	
PDF	Vittal Rao	6,805	33.77	
PSP	Dattatreya Rao	3,843	19.07	
Majority		2,697	13.39	
Turnout		20,150	36.41	
INC win (new seat)				

=== 1952 ===
1952 Hyderabad Legislative Assembly election: Kodangal (2 seats)
Party	Candidate	Votes	%	±%
INC	Anant Reddy	24,988	79.91	
RPI	Bijan Gopal	4,575	14.63	
Socialist	Narayan Swami	1,707	5.46	
INC	Veeraswami	0	0.00	
Majority		20,413	65.28	
Turnout		31,270	29.24	

== See also ==
- List of constituencies of Telangana Legislative Assembly
