= B. Manohar Reddy =

Indian politician (born 1965)

Member of the Telangana Legislative Assembly
- Incumbent
- Assumed office December 2023

Personal details
- Party: Indian National Congress
- Other political affiliations: Bharat Rashtra Samithi (Until October 2023)

Buyyani Manohar Reddy (born 1965) is an Indian politician from Telangana state. He is a member of the Telangana Legislative Assembly from Tandur Assembly constituency in Vikarabad district. He represents Indian National Congress and won the 2023 Telangana Legislative Assembly election.

== Early life and education ==
Reddy is from Tandur. His late father Buyyani Balkistha Reddy was a farmer. He passed Secondary School Certificate (Class X) from Zilla Parishad High School, Kulkacharla, Parigi, Vikarabad district.

== Career ==
In October 2023, Reddy resigned from Bharat Rashtra Samithi and joined Congress. Earlier, he also served as DCCB chairman in the erstwhile Ranga Reddy district. He won from Tandur Assembly constituency representing Indian National Congress in the 2023 Telangana Legislative Assembly election. He polled 84,662 votes and defeated his nearest rival, Pilot Rohith Reddy of Bharat Rashtra Samithi, by a margin of 6,583 votes.
