= Sulthanpoor =

Sulthanpur Shiva Puri Shiva Puri
- Village
- Nickname: Shiva Puri
- Interactive map of Sulthanpur
- Coordinates: 17°09′35″N 77°51′55″E
- Country: India
- State: Telangana
- District: Vikarabad
- Metro: Vikarabad district

Government
  - Body: Mandal Office

Languages
  - Official: Telugu
- Time zone: UTC+5:30 (IST)
- Planning agency: Panchayat
- Civic agency: Mandal Office

Sulthanpur(Shiva Puri) is an area under Parigi Municipal in Vikarabad district, Telangana State(TS), India. It falls under Parigi mandal.
