= Karankote =

- Gram panchayat
- Location in Telangana, India Karankote (India)
- Coordinates: 17.286646°N 77.564390°E
- Country: India
- State: Telangana
- District: Vikarabad
- Mandal: Tandur
- Time zone: UTC+5:30 (IST)
- Pincode: 501158
- ISO 3166 code: IN-TG

Karankote is a village 13 km away from Tandur. It is a major Gram panchayat in the Tandur Mandal, Vikarabad district. A Cement Corporation of India factory is located in this village. Karankote is famous for its Limestone mines.

== About Karankote ==
Karankote is a village in Tandur Mandal in Vikarabad District of Telangana State, India. It belongs to the Telangana region. It is located 77 km towards west from District headquarters Hyderabad. 10 km from Tandur.

Karankote Pin code is 501158 and postal head office is CCI Tandur.

Chandravancha ( 4 km ), Jeevangi ( 6 km ), Kyadgira ( 6 km ), Malkapur ( 6 km ), Belkatur ( 6 km ) are the nearby Villages to Karankote. Karankote is surrounded by Basheerabad Mandal towards South, Yalal Mandal towards East, Chincholi Mandal towards North, Peddemul Mandal towards East.

Tandur, Sedam, Vikarabad, Zahirabad are near by Cities to Karankote.

== Demographics ==
Karankote Local Language is Telugu. According to 2011 Indian Census Karankote Village Total population is 8706 and number of houses are 2008. Female Population is 48.3%. The village literacy rate is 59.3% and the Female Literacy rate is 25.2%.

== Politics ==
Assembly constituency: Tandur assembly constituency

Assembly MLA : Pilot Rohith reddy

Lok Sabha constituency: Chevella parliamentary constituency

Parliament MP: Dr. G. Ranjith Reddy

Village Sarpanch: Medipally Veena

== See also ==
- Tandur Town
- Vikarabad District
- Cement Corporation of India Cement Factory
- Dr. G. Ranjith Reddy Representing the constituency
