= Koppula Harishwar Reddy =

Indian politician (1947–2023)

Koppula Harishwar Reddy (1947 – 23 September 2023) was an Indian politician from Andhra Pradesh. He was a former five time member of the Andhra Pradesh Legislative Assembly from the Pargi Assembly constituency in Ranga Reddy district representing the Telugu Desam Party. He was elected as an MLA in 1985, 1994, 1999, 2004 and 2009. He also served as the deputy speaker of the combined Andhra Pradesh Legislative Assembly.

== Early life and education ==
Reddy was from Parigi, Ranga Reddy district, Andhra Pradesh. He is the son of the late Koppula Narayan Reddy. He had a wife and two sons and a daughter. One of his sons, Mahesh Reddy was elected as an MLA of Parigi after him. He studied till Class 12 at the Government High School, Parigi, Ranga Reddy district and passed the Higher Secondary Certificate in 1963. He was a farmer and he declared assets worth Rs.10 crore in his affidavit to the Election Commission of India.

== Career ==
Reddy started his political life as a deputy sarpanch and soon became a sarpanch of Parigi in 1978. He first became an MLA winning the 1985 Andhra Pradesh Legislative Assembly election representing the Telugu Desam Party. He polled 53,920 votes and defeated his nearest rival, Ahmed Shareef of the Indian National Congress, by 32,512 votes. He polled 48,179 votes in the 1989 Andhra Pradesh Legislative Assembly election but lost Kamatam Ram Reddy of the Indian National Congress by 4,189 votes. He regained the seat in 1994 election and won four consecutive times till 2009. In the 1994 Andhra Pradesh Legislative Assembly election, he garnered 67,433 votes and beat Congress candidate Ram Reddy this time by a margin of 34.515 votes. He defeated Congress candidate Ram Reddy again in the next three elections. In the 1999 Andhra Pradesh Legislative Assembly election, he got 60,360 votes and beat Ram Reddy by 8,616 votes. In the 2004 Andhra Pradesh Legislative Assembly election he polled, 59,809 votes and beat Ram Reddy by 7,648 votes. In the 2009 Andhra Pradesh Legislative Assembly election he bagged 53,099 votes and beat an independent candidate, T Rammohan Reddy, by 14,444 votes while Ram Reddy of the Congress could only finish third, polling 33,117 votes.

=== Death ===
Reddy died of heart attach in Hyderabad on 23 September 2023. He was cremated in his native village Parigi with official honours.
