= Keshav pally =

Village in India

Keshav pally, also known as Keshava pally, is a small village in Nawabpet, Vikarabad District, in Telangana, India. Its postal code is 501111. Its population is about two thousand people. Syed Shah Ali Hussaini's dargah shareef is located in Keshav pally. One of its muthavally is Syed Samiullah Hussaini S/o Syed Shahnabi Hussaini. Every year in the month of March, the URS will be held at this Dargah.
