= Chandravancha =

Village in Telangana, India

Coordinates: 17°01′N 77°40′E

Chandravancha is a village located under Tandur Mandal, Vikarabad district, Telangana State, India.
