= Ananthagiri, Vikarabad district =

Ananthagiri
- Village
- Country: India
- State: Telangana
- District: Vikarabad
- Metro: Vikarabad district
- Talukas: Pargi

Government
  - Body: Mandal Office

Languages
  - Official: Telugu
- Time zone: UTC+5:30 (IST)
- PIN: 501511
- Vehicle registration: TS
- Vidhan Sabha constituency: Chevella
- Planning agency: Panchayat
- Civic agency: Mandal Office
- Website: telangana.gov.in

Anathagiri is a village and panchayat in Vikarabad district, Telangana, India. It falls under Vikarabad mandal.

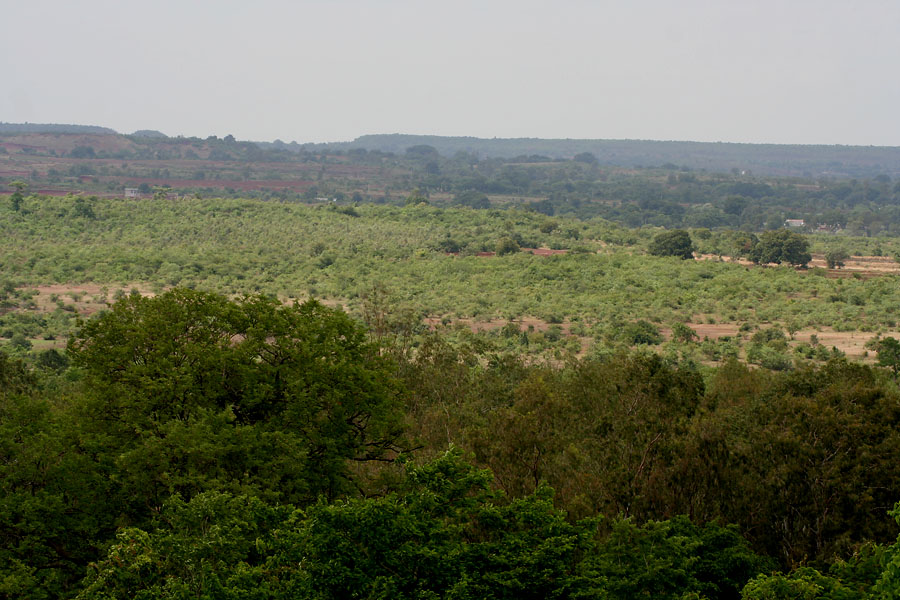
View of Ananthagiri forest

== About ==
Ananthagiri hills is 5 km from Vikarabad city. It is one of the dense forests in Telangana. Ananthagiri Temple is located in this forested area. It is the source of Musi river, which flows through Hyderabad. It is one of the earliest habitat areas. Ancient caves, medieval fort structures and temple shows the antiquity of this area.

== Tourism Attractions ==
- Ananthagiri Hills
- Anantha Padmanabha Swamy Temple
