= Mittakodur =

- Village
- Interactive map of Mittakodur
- Country: India
- State: Telangana
- District: Vikarabad district Vikarabad
- Metro: Vikarabad district

Government
  - Body: Mandal Office

Languages
  - Official: Telugu
- Time zone: UTC+5:30 (IST)
- Planning agency: Panchayat
- Civic agency: Mandal Office

Mittakodur is a village and panchayat in Vikarabad district, TS, India. It falls under Parigi mandal.
