= Cheemaldari =

- Village
- Country: India
- State: Telangana
- District: Ranga Reddy
- Metro: Ranga Reddy district

Government
  - Body: Mominpet Mandal Office

Languages
  - Official: Telugu
- Time zone: UTC+5:30 (IST)
- Vehicle registration: TS
- Planning agency: Panchayat
- Civic agency: Mominpet Mandal Office
- Website: telangana.gov.in

Cheemaldari is a village and panchayat in Vikarabad District, Telangana, India. It falls under Mominpet mandal.
