= Basireddypally =

Basireddy pally
- Village
- Interactive map of Basireddy pally
- Coordinates: 17°12′41″N 77°55′33″E
- Country: India
- State: Telangana
- District: Nalgonda
- Metro: Nalgonda district
- Founder: SHANKAR Yadav

Government
  - Body: Mandal Office

Population (Jan 2018)
  - Total: 1,000+

Languages
  - Official: Telugu
- Time zone: UTC+5:30 (IST)
- Postal code: 508266
- Vehicle registration: TS
- Planning agency: Panchayat
- Civic agency: Mandal Office
- Website: telangana.gov.in

Basireddypally is a village and panchayat in Vikarabad district, Telangana, India. It falls under Pargi mandal.

== Educational facility ==
There is one primary school (called Primary school Basireddypally, ప్రాథమిక పాఠశాల బసిరెడ్డిపల్లి) in the south of the village.

== Religious facility ==
There is one Mosque (called Masjed-E-quba, మస్జేద్-E-క్యుబా) in the center of the village.
