= Turmamidi =

- Village
- Location in Telangana, India Turmamidi (India)
- Coordinates: 17.28°N 77.39°E
- Country: India
- State: Telangana
- District: Vikarabad

Government
  - Body: Panchayath
- Elevation: 650 m (2,130 ft)

Population (2011)
  - Total: 5,775

Languages
  - Official: Telugu
- Time zone: UTC+5:30 (IST)
- PIN: 501142
- Vehicle registration: TS-34

Turmamidi or Thormamidi is a village in Vikarabad district, in the Indian state of Telangana. It is located in the Bantwaram Mandal of the Vikarabad revenue division and borders the Chincholi Taluk of Karnataka.

== Geography ==
This village has a population of 5,775. Its residents speak Telugu, Urdu and Kannada. It is located 37 kilometres (23 mi) from Tandur and 100 kilometres (62 mi) west of Hyderabad. Named after a huge mango tree that had a gaping hole in its huge trunk, the village has a two-hundred year old temple of Sri Venkateswara, whose idol was unearthed from a farm a kilometre away and consecrated outside the village. The deity, being carted by village leaders, refused to enter the village gate, still existing in a partial form. The annual festival is held on Chaitra Pournima (full Moon Day) corresponding to about April. Nearby is Ambrameneswar, five km away nestled in a hillock, where the annual fair is held on last Monday of Sravan. A sugar factory set up in late 60s still survives.

== How to reach ==
Buses to Turmamidi are available from Tandur, Vikarabad, and Zahirabad.

The nearest railway station, at Kohir is 18 kilometres (11 mi) away.
