= Koppula Mahesh Reddy =

Indian politician

Koppula Mahesh Reddy (born 1972) is an Indian politician from Telangana state. He is a former member of the Telangana Legislative Assembly in 2018 from Pargi Assembly constituency in Ranga Reddy district, representing the Telangana Rashtra Samithi.

== Early life and education ==
Reddy is Pargi, Ranga Reddy district, Telangana state. He is the son of five time MLA Koppula Harishwar Reddy. He completed his Class 12 at Little Flower Junior College, Hyderabad, and passed the Board of Intermediate examinations in 1990. Later, he did his graduation at a college affiliated with Osmania University. He runs his own business and declared assets worth Rs.10 crore in his affidavit to the Election Commission of India.

== Career ==
Reddy won the Pargi Assembly constituency in the 2018 Telangana Legislative Assembly election representing the Telangana Rashtra Samithi. He polled 83,467 votes and defeated his nearest rival, T. Ram Mohan Reddy of the Indian National Congress, by a margin of 15,841 votes. He polled 74,523 votes in the 2023 Telangana Legislative Assembly election but lost to Ram Mohan Reddy by a margin of 24,013 votes.
