= Paluvelupula =

Village in Hanamkonda district, Telangana, India

Paluvelupula is a village in Hanamkonda mandal, Hanamkonda district, Telangana.
