= Phulmaddi =

- Village
- Location in Telangana, India
- Coordinates: 17.431153°N 77.874084°E
- Country: India
- State: Telangana
- Region: Vikarabad District
- District: Vikarabad district

Languages
  - Official: Telugu
- Time zone: UTC+5:30 (IST)
- PIN: 501101

Phulmaddi is a village in Vikarabad district, in Telangana State.

== Transport ==
The village is situated to the west of the Vikarabad-Sadasivapet State Highway with connections to nearby towns and cities with regular buses and other modes of transportation. Vikarabad Railway station (10 kilometers away) has a lot of express and passenger trains passing through, with lines toward Secunderabad, Wadi, Mumbai, and Nanded.
