= Rangampally =

- Village
- Interactive map of Rangampally
- Country: India
- State: Telangana
- District: Vikarabad district
- Metro: Vikarabad district

Government
  - Body: Mandal Office

Languages
  - Official: Telugu
- Time zone: UTC+5:30 (IST)
- Planning agency: Panchayat
- Civic agency: Mandal Office

Rangampally is a village and panchayat in Vikarabad district, [[Telangana [TS]], India. It falls under Parigi Mandal, Vikarabad district.
