= Gadsingapur =

- Village
- Location within Telangana Location within India
- Coordinates: 17°09′28″N 77°47′26″E
- Country: India
- State: Telangana
- District: Ranga Reddy
- Metro: Ranga Reddy district

Government
  - Body: Mandal Office

Languages
  - Official: Telugu
- Time zone: UTC+5:30 (IST)
- Vehicle registration: TS
- Planning agency: Panchayat
- Civic agency: Mandal Office
- Website: telangana.gov.in

Gadsingapur is a village and panchayat in Ranga Reddy district, Telangana, India. It falls under Parigi mandal.
