= Tandur railway station =

Railway station in Telangana, India

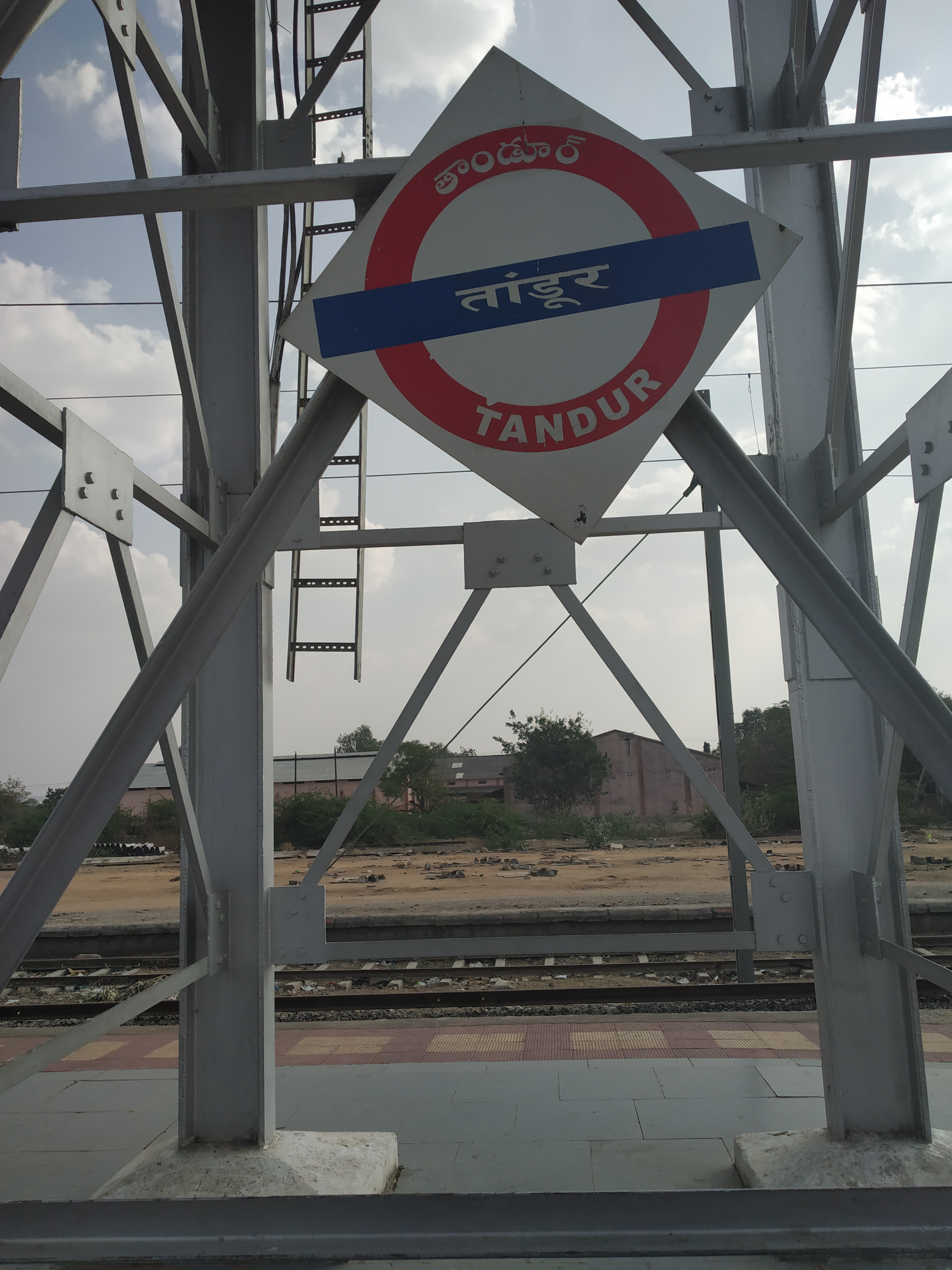
- Tandur Railway Station

General information
- Location: Railway Station Rd, Tandur, Vikarabad District, Telangana; India
- Coordinates: 17°15′00″N 77°34′48″E
- Elevation: 633 m (2,077 ft)
- System: Indian Railways station
- Line: Begumpet–Wadi
- Platforms: 3
- Tracks: 4 5 ft 6 in (1,676 mm) broad gauge

Construction
- Structure type: Standard (on-ground station)
- Parking: Available

Other information
- Status: Functioning
- Station code: TDU
- Zone(s): South Central Railway,
- Division(s): Secunderabad
Location
- Location within Telangana Location within India

Tandur railway station (station code: TDU) is a fourth grade non-suburban (NSG–4) category Indian railway station in Secunderabad railway division of South Central Railway zone. It serves Tandur in Vikarabad district of the Indian state of Telangana. It was selected as one of the 21 stations to be developed under Amrit Bharat Stations scheme.

== History ==
The Wadi–Secunderabad line was built in 1874 with financing by the Nizam of Hyderabad. It later became part of Nizam's Guaranteed State Railway.

== Structure & expansion ==
Tandur railway station has three platforms and four tracks each running to 650 meters in length, a general and reservation booking office, shelters, lighting, benches, Parking, Skyway, waiting room, and toilet facility available.

Preceding station	Indian Railways	Following station
Rukmapur (RMY) towards ?	South Central Railway zone Begumpet–Wadi	Mantatti (MVH) towards ?
