= T. Ram Mohan Reddy =

Indian politician

Tammannagari Ram Mohan Reddy

Member of the Telangana Legislative Assembly
- Incumbent
- Assumed office December 2023
- In office 2014–2018
- Constituency: Parigi

Personal details
- Born: 1965 (age 60–61) Shivareddypally, Doma Mandal, Vikarabad District.
- Citizenship: India
- Party: Indian National Congress
- Spouse: T Uma Devi
- Children: T Meghana, Dr.T Rithik Reddy (Vice Chairman, TRR Institute of Medical Sciences).
- Education: Osmania University
- Occupation: Politician

Tammannagari Ram Mohan Reddy (born 1965) is an Indian politician from Telangana state. He is a two time MLA from Pargi Assembly constituency in Vikarabad district. He represents Indian National Congress.

== Early life and education ==
Reddy was born in Shivareddypally, Domah mandal, Vikarabad district. His late father was Rama Krishna Reddy. He completed his doctorate in 2023 from Osmania University. Earlier, he did MBA in 1990, also at Osmania University. In 2001, he established the TRR group of institutions in 2001.

== Career ==
Reddy won from Pargi Assembly constituency representing Indian National Congress in the 2023 Telangana Legislative Assembly election. He polled 98,536 votes and defeated his nearest rival, K. Mahesh Reddy of Bharat Rashtra Samithi, by a margin of 24,013 votes. Earlier, he won the 2014 Andhra Pradesh Legislative Assembly election from Pargi Assembly constituency on Congress ticket. However, he lost the 2018 Assembly election to TRS candidate K. Mahesh Reddy.

He also served as the Whip of the Congress party in the first Telangana Legislative Assembly. In 2020, he became the convener of Pradesh Congress Committee and took up the agitation against Pothireddypadu lift irrigation project and also fought for grounding the Palamuru-Rangareddy Lift Irrigation Scheme .

He won the 2023 Telangana Legislative Assembly election.
