= Warangal mandal =

- Mandal
- Country: India
- State: Telangana
- District: Warangal district
- Headquarters: Warangal

Population (2011)
  - Total: 297,078

Languages
  - Official: Telugu
- Time zone: UTC+5:30 (IST)
- Vehicle registration: TS
- Website: telangana.gov.in

Warangal mandal is one of the 13 mandals in Warangal district in of the Indian state of Telangana. It is under the administration of Warangal revenue division and has its headquarters at Warangal. The mandal is bounded by Hanamkonda and Hasanparthy mandals.

== Government and politics ==
Warangal mandal is one of the three mandals under Warangal East and Warangal West assembly constituencies. The two constituencies in turn represents Warangal lok sabha constituency of Telangana Legislative Assembly.

== Towns and villages ==
The city of Warangal covers the entire mandal and do not have any villages.

== See also ==
- List of mandals in Telangana
