= Patnam Narender Reddy =

Indian politician

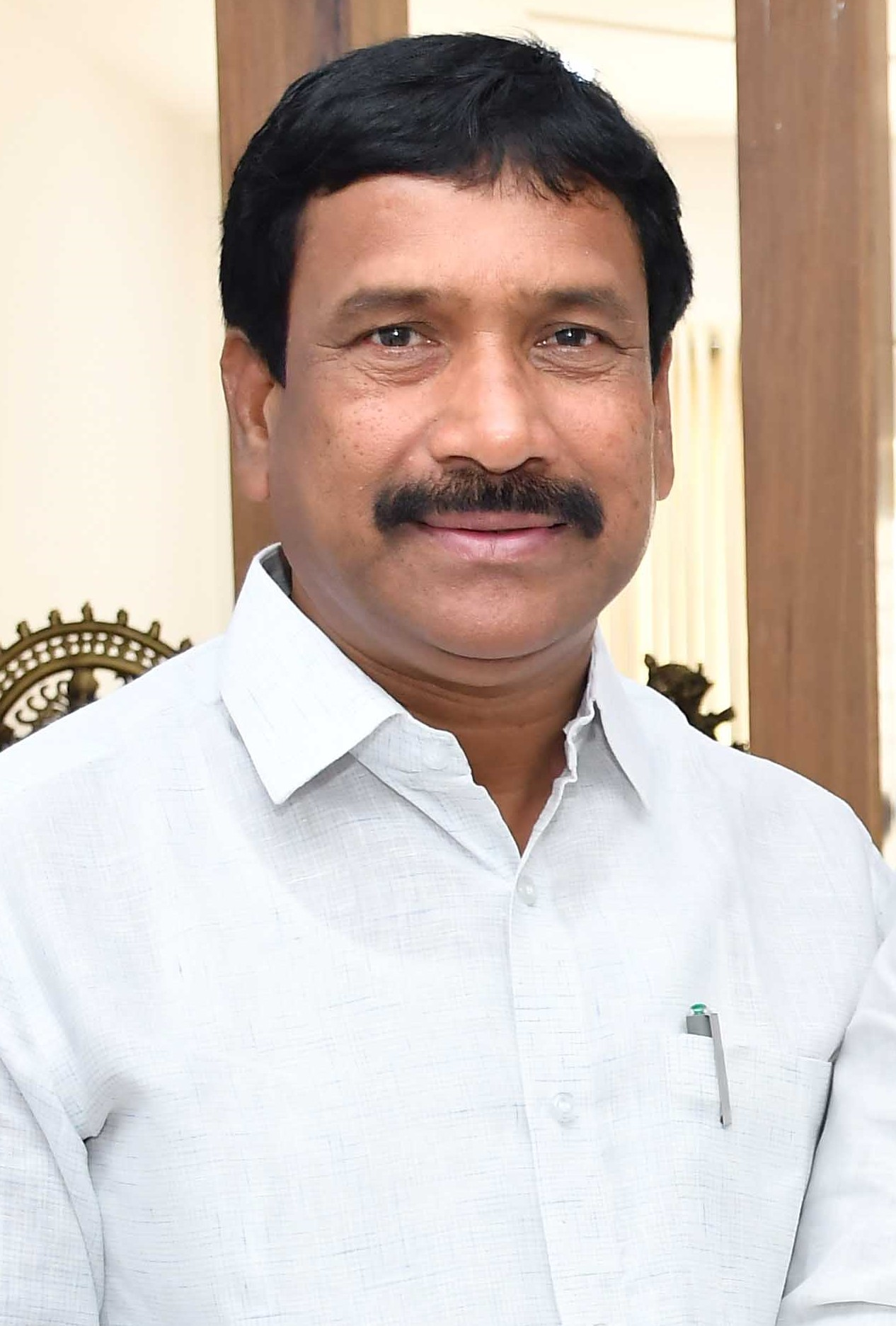

Member of Legislative Assembly, Telangana
- In office 2018–2023
- Preceded by: Revanth Reddy
- Succeeded by: Revanth Reddy
- Constituency: Kodangal

Personal details
- Party: Bharat Rashtra Samithi
- Relatives: Patnam Mahender Reddy (brother)

Patnam Narender Reddy is a politician in the Indian state of Telangana. He was a Member of Legislative Assembly representing the Kodangal Assembly constituency from 2018 to 2023 by defeating Revanth Reddy in the 2018 Telangana Legislative Assembly election. He was subsequently defeated by Revanth Reddy in the 2023 Telangana Legislative Assembly election with a margin of 32,532 votes.

== Family ==
He is the brother P. Mahender Reddy, a multi-term legislator, minister and a current member of Telangana Legislative Council.
