= Manik Prabhu Temple =

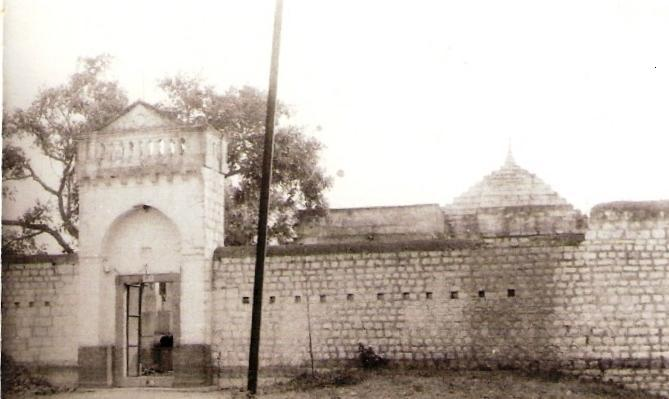

Religion
- Affiliation: Hinduism

Manik Prabhu Temple is a mandir in Mominpet, Andhra Pradesh, India. It was built by Kotra Janaiah Gupta in 1861.
