= Ananthagiri Temple =

Coordinates: 17.3099°N 77.8628°E

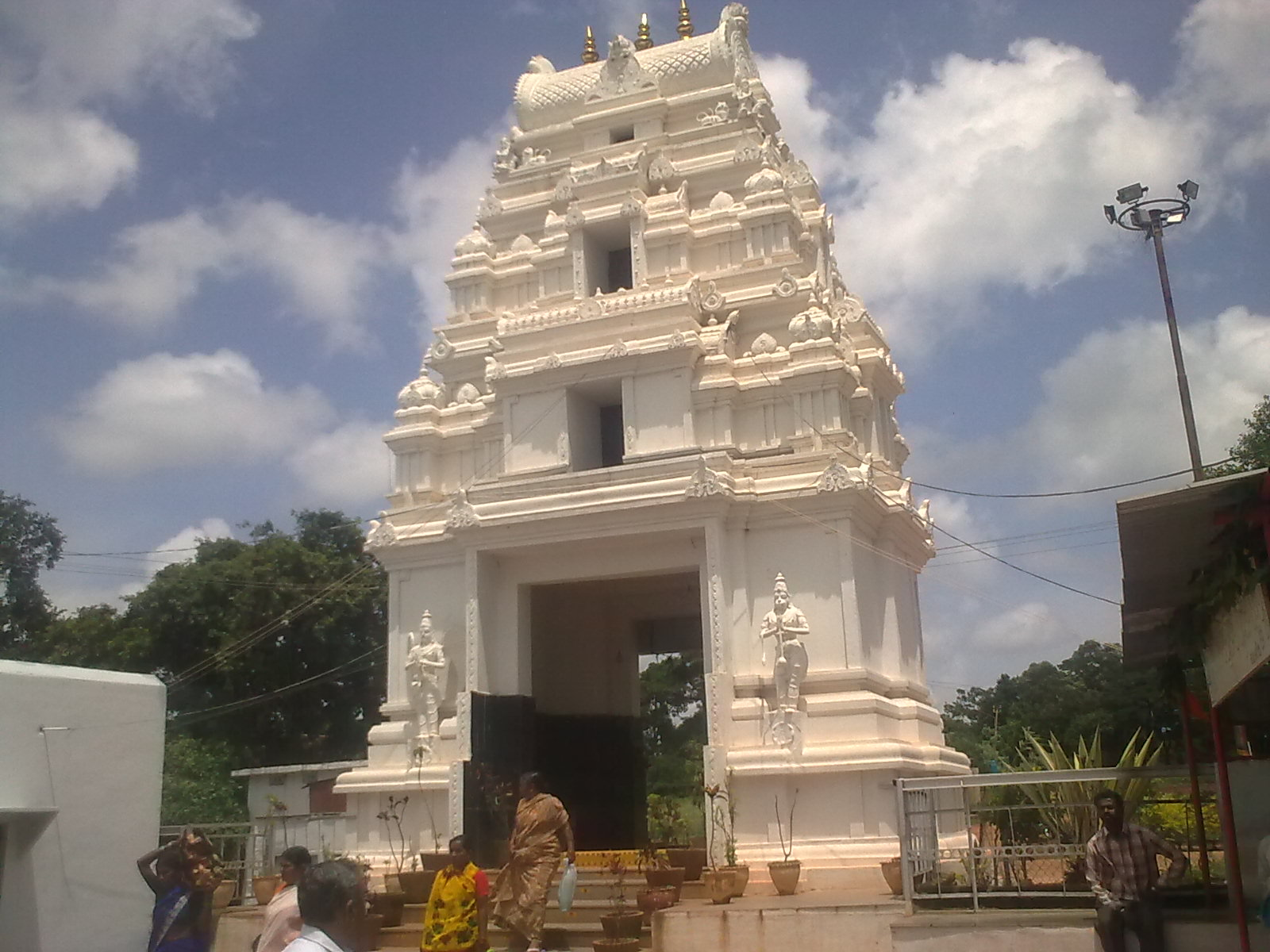
- Ananthagiri Temple

Religion
- Affiliation: Hinduism
- Deity: Vishnu

Location
- Location: Ananthagiri, India
- State: Telangana
- Country: India
- Interactive map of Ananthagiri Temple

Architecture
- Type: South Indian

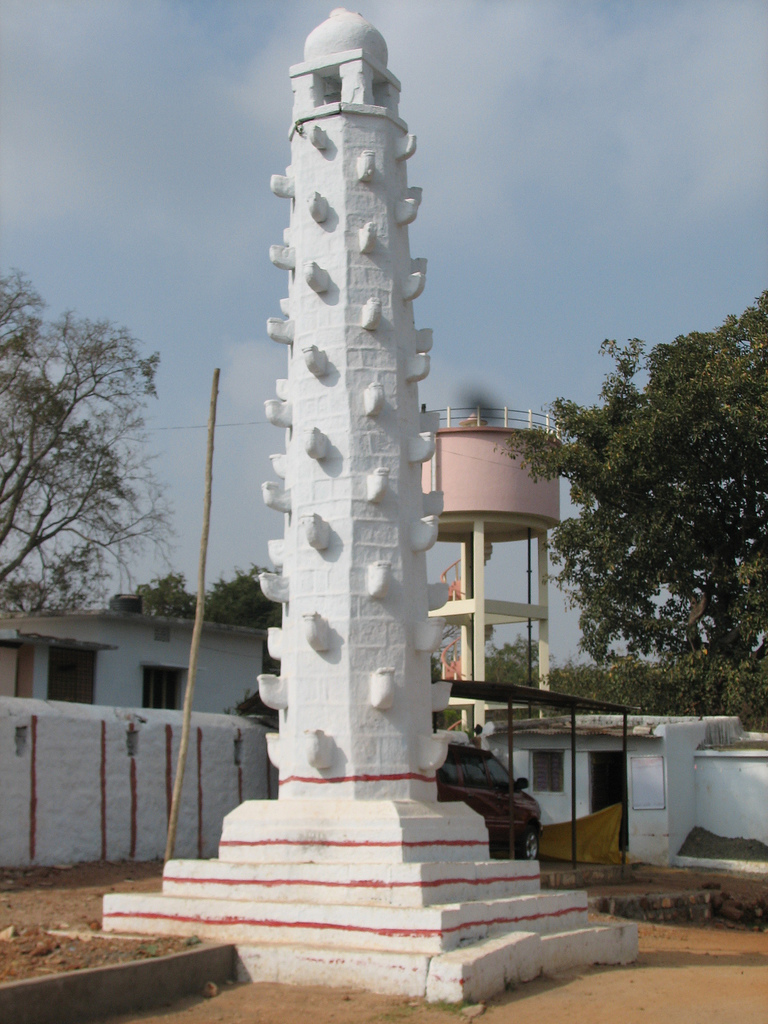
A white stambha at the temple

Anantha Padmanabha Swamy or Ananthagiri Temple is a Hindu temple of Vishnu in Ananthagiri, Vikarabad district, Telangana India.

== See also ==
- Ananthagiri Hills
