= Revanth Reddy =

Chief Minister of Telangana (born 1969)

- CM Revanth Reddy at Gaddar Awards 2025

2nd Chief Minister of Telangana
- Incumbent
- Assumed office 7 December 2023
- Governor: Tamilisai Soundararajan; C. P. Radhakrishnan (additional charge); Jishnu Dev Varma; Shiv Pratap Shukla
- Deputy: Mallu Bhatti Vikramarka
- Cabinet: Reddy
- Preceded by: K. Chandrashekar Rao
Additional ministries
Incumbent
Assumed office 7 December 2023
Ministry and Departments	Municipal Administration & Urban Development; General Administration; Law & Order; All other departments not allocated to any other Minister
Preceded by	K. Chandrashekar Rao (General Administration and Law & Order); K. T. Rama Rao (Municipal Administration & Urban Development)

3rd President of Telangana Pradesh Congress Committee
- In office 7 July 2021 – 6 September 2024
- AICC President: Sonia Gandhi (2021-2022); Mallikarjun Kharge (2022-2024)
- Preceded by: N. Uttam Kumar Reddy
- Succeeded by: Bomma Mahesh Kumar Goud

Member of Parliament, Lok Sabha
- In office 23 May 2019 – 8 December 2023
- Preceded by: Malla Reddy
- Succeeded by: Etela Rajendar
- Constituency: Malkajgiri, Telangana

Member of Telangana Legislative Assembly
- Incumbent
- Assumed office 7 December 2023
- Preceded by: Patnam Narender Reddy
- Constituency: Kodangal
- In office 2 June 2014 – 11 December 2018
- Preceded by: constituency shifted from Andhra Pradesh
- Succeeded by: Patnam Narender Reddy
- Constituency: Kodangal

Member of Andhra Pradesh Legislative Assembly
- In office 16 May 2009 – 16 May 2014
- Preceded by: Gurunath Reddy
- Succeeded by: constituency shifted to Telangana
- Constituency: Kodangal

Member of Andhra Pradesh Legislative Council
- In office 2007–2009
- Chairman: A. Chakrapani
- Deputy Chairman: Mohammed Jani
- Leader of the House: Y. S. Rajasekhara Reddy
- Constituency: Mahboobnagar

Personal details
- Born: Anumula Revanth Reddy; 8 November 1969 (age 56) Kondareddipalle, Andhra Pradesh, India
- Party: Indian National Congress (since 2017)
- Other political affiliations: Telugu Desam Party (2007–2017)
- Spouse: Geetha Reddy (m. 1992)
- Children: 1
- Education: Andhra Vidyalaya College (B.A.)
- Occupation: Politician
- Website: revanthreddy.com

Anumula Revanth Reddy (born 8 November 1969) is an Indian politician who is serving as the second and current chief minister of Telangana. He is also the state minister for municipal administration and urban development, general administration and law & order. As a member of the Indian National Congress, he is the current Member of the Legislative Assembly for Kodangal.

He previously represented Malkajgiri as a member of parliament in the Lok Sabha. Appointed president of the Telangana Pradesh Congress Committee in July 2021, he led his party to victory in the 2023 Telangana Legislative Assembly election, defeating the incumbent Bharat Rashtra Samithi party.

== Early and personal life ==
Anumula Revanth Reddy was born on 8 November 1969 in Konda Reddy Pally of Mahboobnagar, Andhra Pradesh (present-day Nagarkurnool, Telangana), India. He graduated with a Bachelor of Arts from Andhra Vidyalaya College, Osmania University, Hyderabad. Reddy married Getha, former union minister Jaipal Reddy's niece. The couple have a daughter.

== Political career ==
=== Early political career ===
Revanth Reddy was a member of ABVP, an RSS affiliated organization, while he was a student. In 2006, he contested the local body election and was elected as ZPTC member from Midjil mandal as an independent candidate.

In 2007, Reddy was elected as a Member of Legislative Council (MLC) as an independent candidate. Later, he met Telugu Desam Party (TDP) chief N. Chandrababu Naidu and joined the TDP.

=== Member of Legislative Assembly (MLA) ===
In 2009, Revanth was elected to the Andhra Pradesh Assembly from Kodangal constituency with 46.46% votes as a TDP candidate. He won against the incumbent and five-time MLA, Gurunath Reddy of Congress (INC). He served as an MLA in the Andhra Pradesh Assembly between 2009 and 2014 and in Telangana Assembly, between 2014 and 2018.

He contested the 2014 undivided Andhra Pradesh Legislative Assembly elections and was elected to the Telangana Assembly from Kodangal with a majority of 14,614 votes against Gurunath Reddy. He was elected as the floor leader of Telugu Desam Party (TDP) in the Telangana Legislative Assembly.

On 25 October 2017, TDP removed him as the floor leader of the Telangana TDP after reports surfaced that he would consider joining the Congress party. On 31 October 2017, he formally joined the Congress party.

He contested the 2018 Telangana Assembly elections from Kodangal as an Indian National Congress (INC) candidate and lost to Bharat Rashtra Samithi (BRS) candidate, Patnam Narender Reddy, marking his first defeat in an election. On 20 September 2018, he was appointed one of the three working presidents of Telangana Pradesh Congress Committee (TPCC), replacing N. Uttam Kumar Reddy.

=== Member of Parliament (MP) ===
Following his defeat in the 2018 Telangana legislative assembly election, Reddy successfully contested the 2019 general election from the Malkajgiri Lok Sabha constituency as a Congress candidate, by a margin of 10,919 votes, constituting 38.63% of the total votes. He defeated his closest competitor, Marri Rajashekar Reddy from BRS.

=== 2023 Telangana Assembly election campaign ===
In June 2021, Reddy was appointed president of Telangana Pradesh Congress Committee, replacing N. Uttam Kumar Reddy. He took on the new role from 7 July 2021.

He led the Congress' successful campaigning against the incumbent Chief Minister K. Chandrashekar Rao in 2023 Telangana Legislative Assembly election with the party winning 64 seats, 4 seats past the majority mark. He contested from Kodangal and Kamareddy constituencies, winning in the former seat and losing in the latter. After his earlier wins from Kodangal constituency in 2009 and 2014, he is representing the constituency for the third time.

== Chief Minister of Telangana ==
All India Congress Committee (AICC) named Reddy as the leader of Congress Legislature Party, following the elected MLAs' resolution authorising the AICC to nominate the leader, paving way for him to become the Chief Minister of Telangana. On 7 December 2023, he took oath as the Chief Minister of Telangana, making him the second person to hold the post.

In the first ten days of his governance, the government launched 2 of his 6 "guarantees", the free bus travel for women and insurance under the 'Arogyasri' scheme was increased to ₹10 lakh. Its 'Praja Palana' outreach program receives over 1.05 crore applications, covering as many as 1.11 crore households. In July, another guarantee, the crop loan waiver was passed, with the Telangana government releasing ₹31,000 crore for it. The waiver was set to benefit around 40 lakh farmers across the state.

In May 2024, he was summoned by the Delhi Police after the Telangana Congress shared a doctored video of Amit Shah on its Twitter handle. He denied any role in the creation or the dissemination of the video.

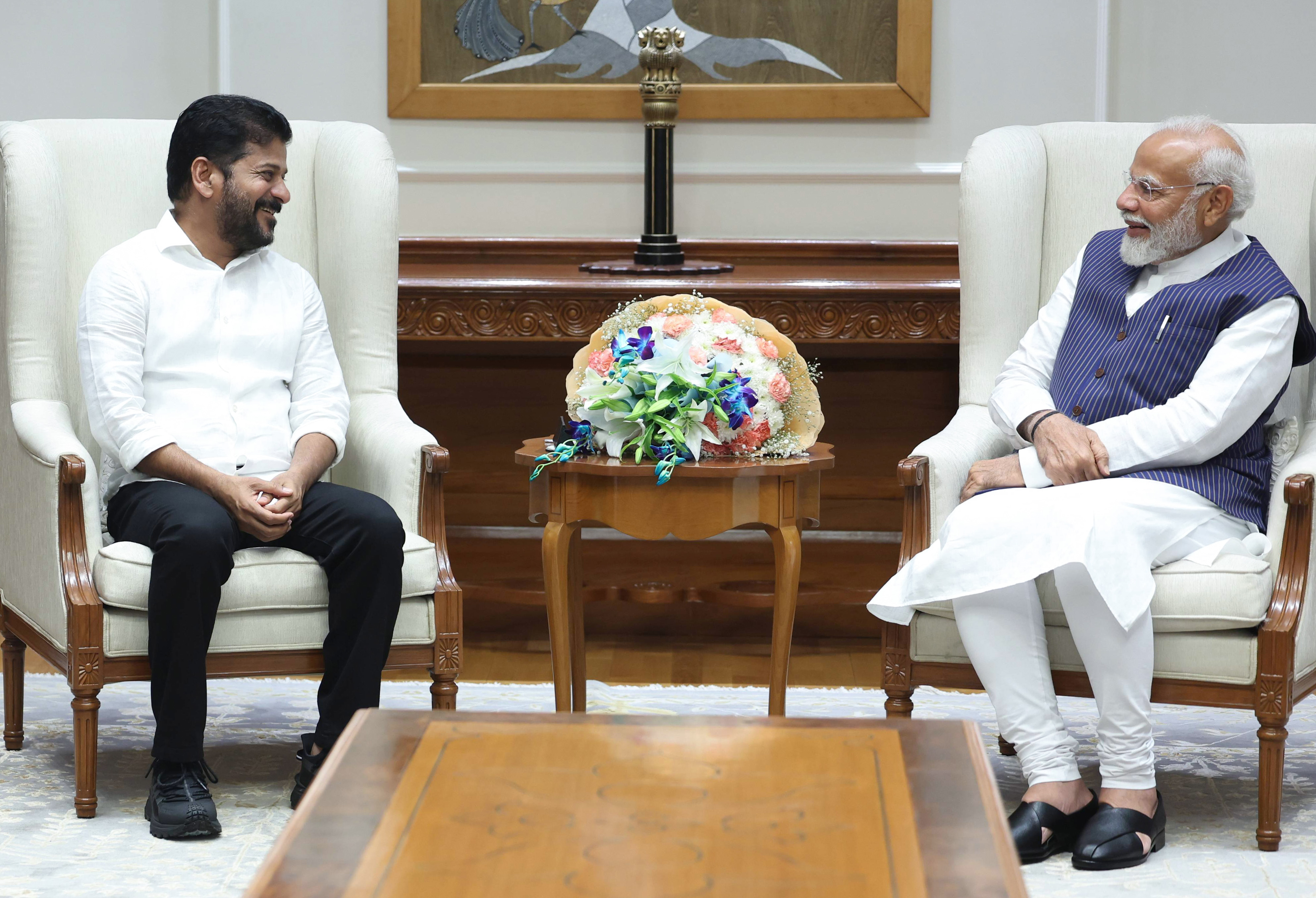
Revanth Reddy calling on Prime Minister Narendra Modi in July 2024

In celebrations of 10 years of Telangana achieving statehood, his government celebrated it on a grand scale on 2 June 2024.

He met with Union Ministers Nitin Gadkari, Piyush Goyal, Amit Shah and J. P. Nadda in July 2024, in order to expedite pending infrastructure works and to release funds for other state works. He also met Prime Minister Narendra Modi and requested him to allot the Sravanapalli coal mining block to the PSU Singareni Collieries Company.

In August 2024, he took part in a tour of the United States in a bid to get more companies to invest in Telangana. Many companies, including Amgen and Charles Schwab agreed to open offices in Hyderabad.

As Chief Minister, he was vocal against residential and commercial properties encroaching on lakes and other water bodies. In July 2024, the Telangana government formed the Hyderabad Disaster Response and Asset Monitoring and Protection Agency (HYDRAA) to take care of such issues. He wanted HYDRAA to be developed as a strong system and was ready to allocate parts of the state budget for it. In August 2024, HYDRAA had begun to take down multiple under-construction and fully constructed structures which encroached on various water bodies in Hyderabad, including a convention centre owned by actor Nagarjuna. The body received a lot of public support for protecting the city's lakes and ponds. Under his tenure as CM, Telangana Rising 2047 Vision Document has been prepared which has created three distinct economic zones. - CURE (Core Urban Region Economy, for Services Sector Only, with Net Zero) - PURE (Peri-Urban Region Economy, for manufacturing) - RARE (Rural Agri Region Economy) in Telangana.

== Electoral history ==
He was elected as the ZPTC from Midjil in 2006 and as an independent MLC in 2007 through elections by local bodies from Mahabubnagar.

=== Legislative Assembly Elections ===
Year	Constituency	Party	Votes	%	Opponent	Opponent Party	Opponent Votes	%	Result	Margin	%
2023	Kamareddy	INC	54,916	28.47	K. V. Ramana Reddy	BJP	66,652	34.55	Lost	-11,736	-6.08
2023	Kodangal	INC	107,429	55.05	Patnam Narender Reddy	BRS	75,897	38.38	Won	+31,532	+16.67
2018	Kodangal	INC	71,435	43.15	Patnam Narender Reddy	TRS	80,754	48.78	Lost	-9,319	-5.63
2014	Kodangal	TDP	54,026	39.06	Gurunath Reddy	TRS	39,412	28.50	Won	+14,614	+10.56
2009	Kodangal	TDP	61,685	46.45	Gurunath Reddy	INC	54,696	41.49	Won	+6,989	+4.96

=== Parliament: Lok Sabha ===
Year	Constituency	Party	Votes	%	Opponent	Opponent Party	Opponent Votes	%	Result	Margin	%
2019	Malkajgiri	INC	603,748	38.63	Marri Rajasekhar Reddy	TRS	592,829	37.93	Won	10,919	0.70

=== Assembly, Parliament and Local Authorities Elections ===
Year	Constituency	Constituency Type	Winner (Candidate)	Party	Votes	%	Runner-up (Main Opponent)	Party	Votes	%	Majority
2007	Mahbubnagar	Local Authorities (MLC)	A. Revanth Reddy	Ind	—	—	—	INC	—	—	—
2009	Kodangal	Assembly (MLA)	A. Revanth Reddy	TDP	61,685	46.45%	Gurunath Reddy	INC	54,696	41.19%	6,989
2014	Kodangal	Assembly (MLA)	A. Revanth Reddy	TDP	54,026	39.06%	Gurunath Reddy	TRS	39,412	28.50%	14,614
2018	Kodangal	Assembly (MLA)	Patnam Narender Reddy	TRS	80,754	49.03%	A. Revanth Reddy	INC	71,435	43.37%	9,319
2019	Malkajgiri	Parliament (MP)	A. Revanth Reddy	INC	603,748	38.63%	Marri Rajashekar Reddy	TRS	592,829	37.93%	10,919
2023	Kodangal	Assembly (MLA)	A. Revanth Reddy	INC	107,429	55.02%	Patnam Narender Reddy	BRS	74,897	38.36%	32,532
2023	Kamareddy	Assembly (MLA)	K. V. Ramana Reddy	BJP	66,652	35.58%	K. Chandrashekar Rao	BRS	60,011	32.04%	6,641

== Overseas engagements ==
In June 2009, when Indian students were being attacked in Australia, then Telugu Desam leaders Reddy and Nama Nageswara Rao had visited Melbourne, Australia to meet with International students from India. Reddy had visited hospitals, and travelled in trains and public transport in Melbourne to meet victims, and interact with Indian students in Australia, to get a better understanding of the situation.

Reddy visited the Victorian Parliament and met with then Victorian Opposition Leader Ted Baillieu to raise concerns about attacks on Indian students in Melbourne, Australia.

In July 2009, Baillieu later visited Delhi, India, where he had a follow-up meeting with Reddy on the same issue.

== Controversies ==
=== Arrest for bribery ===
On 31 May 2015, Revanth Reddy was arrested by the Anti-Corruption Bureau (ACB), Andhra Pradesh during a sting operation, for bribing nominated MLA Elvis Stephenson to vote in favour of the Telugu Desam Party (TDP) candidate in the legislative council election. A criminal case under sections of Prevention of Corruption Act and Sections 120-B (criminal conspiracy), 34 (common intention) of the Indian Penal Code was registered against him along with two others – Bishop Sebastian Harry and Uday Simha. On 30 June, the Telangana High Court gave conditional bail. TDP party members celebrated Revanth Reddy's release on 1 July 2015 with a rally. He spent 30 days in jail. Due to the involvement of a TDP MLA, it was suspected that TDP chief N. Chandrababu Naidu was the main man behind the scam.

In May 2021, when he was a Lok Sabha MP, the Enforcement Directorate filed a chargesheet against him in connection with the scam. In October 2023, 2 months before the 2023 Telangana Legislative Assembly election, the Supreme Court dismissed his plea challenging the ACB court's decision to reject his request in 2021. In February 2024, the Supreme Court heard an appeal and transferred the case to a trial court outside Telangana to ensure that a fair trial takes place. In April 2024, it deferred a hearing until July.

== See also ==
- Revanth Reddy ministry

Political offices
Preceded by K. Chandrashekar Rao	Chief Minister of Telangana; 2014–present	Incumbent
