= Basheerabad =

- Village
- Location in Telangana, India Basheerabad (India)
- Coordinates: 17.2167°N 77.4333°E
- Country: India
- State: Telangana
- District: Vikarabad
- Elevation: 431 m (1,414 ft)

Languages
  - Official: Telugu and Urdu languages
- Time zone: UTC+5:30 (IST)
- Postal code: 501143
- Vehicle registration: TS07

Basheerabad is a village in Vikarabad district of the Indian state of Telangana. It is located in Basheerabad mandal of Tandur revenue division.

== Geography ==
Bashirabad is located at 17.2167°N 77.4333°E. It has an average elevation of 431 meters (1417 feet). The neighbor mandals of Basheerabad are Tandur and Yalal. It is 130 km away from the Hyderabad, capital city of Telangana.
