= Ananthagiri, Alluri Sitharama Raju district =

Ananthagiri
- Village
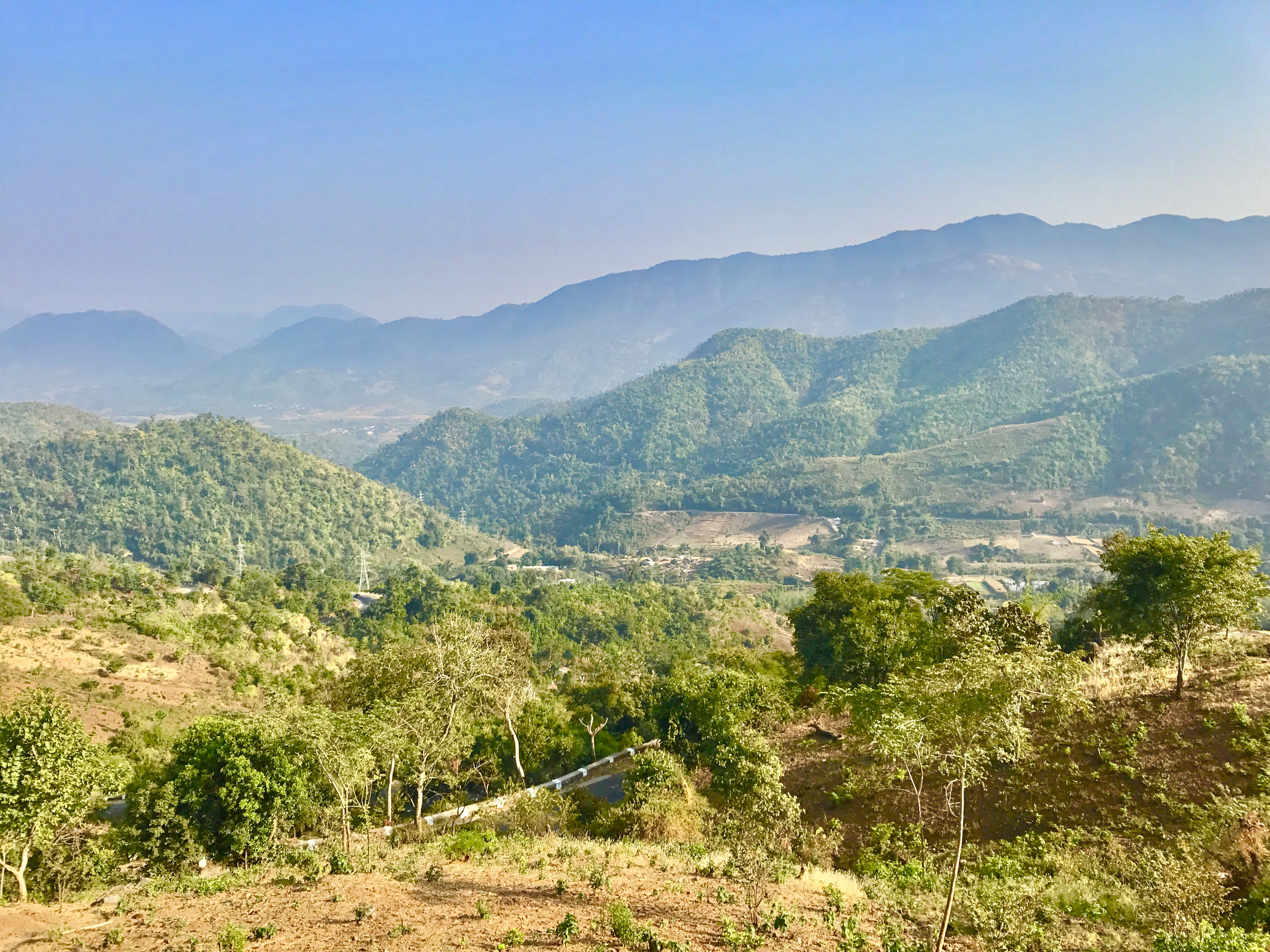
- Hills in Araku Valley, near Anathagiri
- Interactive map of Ananthagiri
- Location in Andhra Pradesh, India Ananthagiri (India)
- Coordinates: 18.195766°N 82.996847°E
- Country: India
- State: Andhra Pradesh
- District: Alluri Sitharama Raju district

Languages
  - Official: Telugu
- Time zone: UTC+5:30 (IST)
- Vehicle Registration: AP31 (Former); AP39 (from 30 January 2019)

Ananthagiri is a village in Alluri Sitharama Raju district in the state of Andhra Pradesh in India.
