= Gurunath Reddy =

Indian politician

Gurunath Reddy is five time legislator in the state of Andhra Pradesh from the Indian National Congress. On all five occasions, he represented Kodangal Assembly constituency. He is a current chairman of the Telangana State Police Housing Corporation.
