= Pilot Rohith Reddy =

Indian politician

Member of Legislative Assembly
- In office 2018–2023
- Preceded by: P. Mahender Reddy
- Succeeded by: Buyyani Manohar Reddy
- Constituency: Tandur

Personal details
- Born: 7 June 1984 (age 42)
- Party: Bharat Rashtra Samithi
- Spouse: Arthi Reddy
- Education: Blekinge Institute of Technology

Panjugula Rohith Reddy is an Indian politician also famously known as Pilot Rohith Reddy who earlier represented Tandur as a member of the Telangana Legislative Assembly. He was first elected in the 2018 Telangana Legislative Assembly election, where he received 70428 votes.

The Elite Action Group for Drug Law Enforcement (EAGLE) team of Telangana police conducted a surprise raid at former Bharat Rashtra Samithi (BRS) MLA Pilot Rohith Reddy's farmhouse in Moinabad on 14 March 2026. Pilot Rohith Reddy along with five other tested positive in the drug test. He along with his brother Ritesh Reddy and Namith Sharma were remanded to judicial custody for 14 days.
