= Kotepally =

- Village
- Location in Telangana, India Kotepally (India)
- Coordinates: 17°23′3.5196″N 77°44′41.5392″E
- Country: India
- State: Telangana
- District: Vikarabad
- Talukas: Kotepally

Languages
  - Official: Telugu
- Time zone: UTC+5:30 (IST)
- PIN: 501106
- Vehicle registration: TG 34

Kotepally is a village in Vikarabad district of the Indian state of Telangana. It is located in Kotepally mandal of Vikarabad revenue division.
