= P. Mahender Reddy =

Indian politician (born 1963)

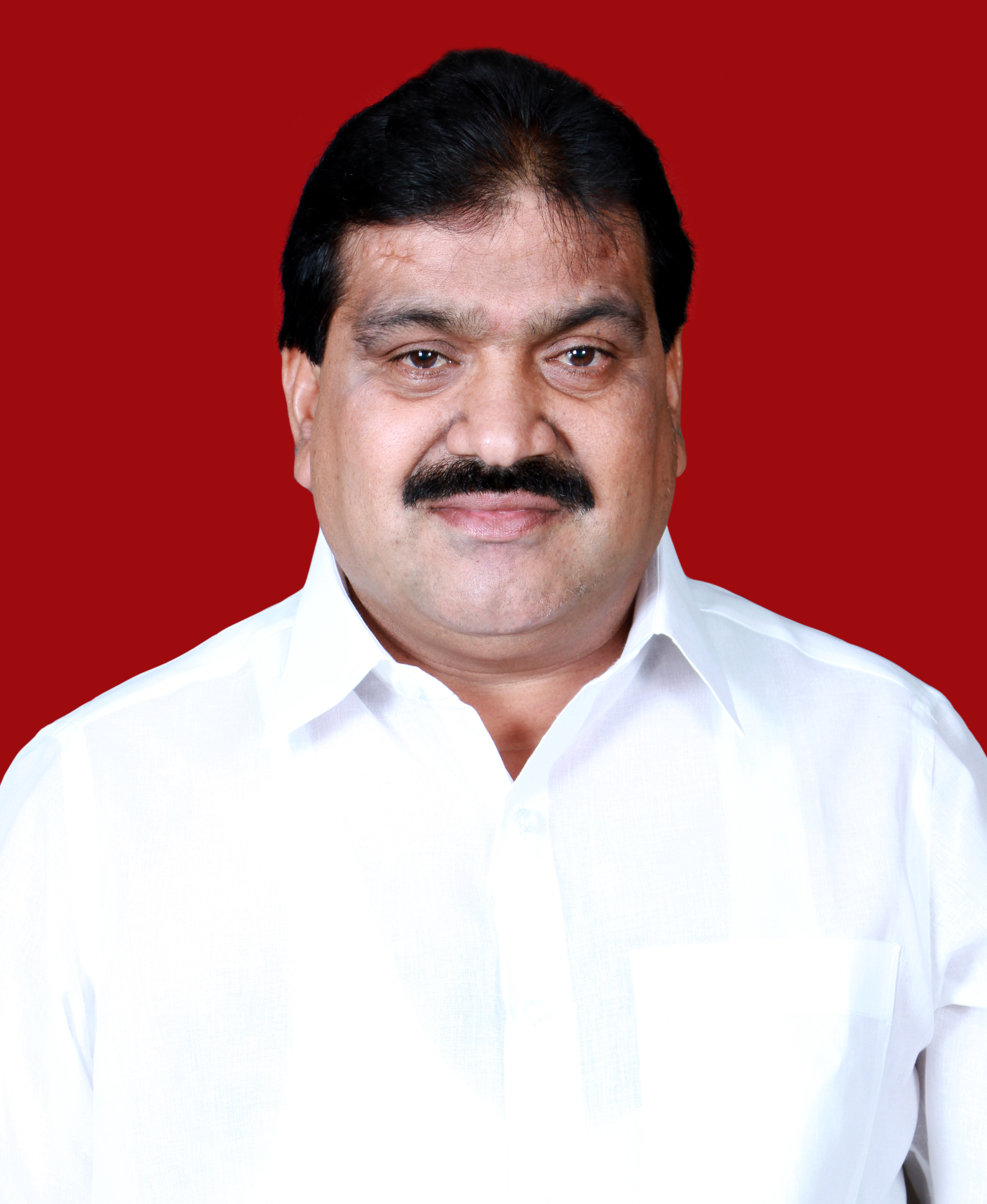

Minister of Mines & Geology, Information and Public Relations Government of Telangana
- In office 24 August 2023 – 3 December 2023
- Governor: Tamilisai Soundararajan
- Chief Minister: K. Chandrasekhar Rao
- Preceded by: Chief Minister of Telangana
- Succeeded by: Ponguleti Srinivas Reddy

Member of Legislative Council, Telangana
- Incumbent
- Assumed office 5 Jan 2022
- Chairman: Gutha Sukender Reddy
- Deputy Chairman: Banda Prakash
- Leader of the House: K. Chandrasekhar Rao; Anumula Revanth Reddy
- Constituency: Ranga Reddy (Local Authority Constituency)

Minister of Transport Government of Telangana
- In office 2 June 2014 – 8 September 2018
- Governor: E. S. L. Narasimhan
- Chief Minister: K. Chandrasekhar Rao
- Preceded by: Office Established
- Succeeded by: Puvvada Ajay Kumar

Member of Legislative Assembly, Telangana
- In office 2014–2018
- Preceded by: Telangana Assembly Created
- Succeeded by: Pilot Rohith Reddy
- Constituency: Tandur

Member of Legislative Assembly Andhra Pradesh
- In office 2009–2014
- Preceded by: Malkud Narayan Rao
- Succeeded by: Telangana Legislative Assembly
- Constituency: Tandur
- In office 1994–2004
- Preceded by: M. Chandra Sekhar
- Succeeded by: Malkud Narayan Rao
- Constituency: Tandur

Personal details
- Born: 23 September 1963 (age 62) Hyderabad
- Party: Indian National Congress
- Other political affiliations: Telangana Rashtra Samithi, Telugu Desam Party
- Spouse: Sunitha Mahender Reddy
- Children: 1 Son, 1 Daughter
- Parents: Late Sri P. Malla Reddy (father); Smt. P. Rukkamma (mother)
- Education: B.V.sc

Patnam Mahender Reddy (23 September 1963) is an Indian politician from Telangana. He is a four time MLA and former minister in the Telangana Rashtra Samithi (2001–2022) and later Party name renamed as Bharat Rashtra Samithi government.

== Electoral history ==
Year	Constituency	Party	Votes	%	Opponent	Result	Margin
1994	Tandur	TDP	41,135	40.16%	M. Narayana Rao (INC)	Won	10,191
1999	Tandur	TDP	54,621	49.33%	M. Narayana Rao (INC)	Won	11,811
2004	Tandur	TDP	48,154	39.46%	Malkud Narayan Rao (INC)	Lost	-13,575
2009	Tandur	TDP	63,737	48.83%	Malkud Ramesh (INC)	Won	13,203
2014	Tandur	TRS	61,293	45.97%	Malkud Narayan Rao (INC)	Won	16,074
2018	Tandur	TRS	67,553	43.18%	Pilot Rohith Reddy (INC)	Lost	-2,875
2019	Ranga Reddy (Local Authorities)	TRS	—	—	Uncontested Election	Won	—
2021	Ranga Reddy (Local Authorities)	BRS	—	—	Unanimous Election	Won	—

== Personal life and education ==
Mahender Reddy was born in Golluriguda in Shabad Mandal. He is a veterinary doctor. He is the nephew of former Home Minister and MLA, P. Indra Reddy. He received a Bachelor's degree in Veterinary Sciences (BVSc) from Osmania University. He married Sunitha Reddy. She was the Zilla Parishad Chairperson of Ranga Reddy District for two terms. His brother Patnam Narender Reddy was an MLC from erstwhile Ranga Reddy District for two terms and won the November 2018 Assembly election against Revanth Reddy from Kodangal constituency. In February 2024, his wife Sunitha Reddy joined Congress.

== Career ==
Mahender Reddy was 4-time MLA from Tandur Assembly Constituency. He was elected as MLA to Andhra Pradesh State Legislative Assembly from Tandur assembly constituency in 1994, 1999 and 2009 and after bifurcation of the state was re-elected in 2014 to Telangana Legislative Assembly.

He was elected first in the 1994 general elections from Tandur constituency, Ranga Reddy District on Telugu Desam Party. Mahender Reddy was the Ranga Reddy district President of Telugu Desam Party from 2009 to 2014.

=== TRS ===
Reddy joined TRS in 2014 and was elected as an MLA from Tandur assembly constituency for a 4th term. He was the Minister for Transportation in the first Telangana government from 2014 to 2018. He lost the elections in Nov 2018. However, his clout on the Rangareddy district politics ensured that the TRS party elected him as an MLC in 2019. In August 2023, he was made a minister for Mines & Geology and Information & Public Relations again after his name was dropped for the Tandur Assembly seat.

== Other interests ==
He is Chairman of Dr. Patnam Mahender Reddy Institute of Medical Sciences, Chevella.

He is the Chairman of Patnam Mahender Reddy Memorial Educational Society which consists of three engineering colleges in and around Hyderabad, namely PRRM Engineering College, Shabad, Ranga Reddy district, Raja Mahendra College of Engineering, Ibrahimpatnam, Ranga Reddy district and P. Indra Reddy Memorial Engineering College, Chevella, Ranga Reddy district.

== Controversy ==
Reddy was involved in rude behaviour with police and apologised later. But a case was booked by Yalal police station of Tandur mandal in Viakrabad under different sections for detering a public servant from discharging his duties.
