= Peddemul =

- Location in Telangana, India Peddemul (India)
- Coordinates: 17.3333°N 77.6667°E
- Country: India
- State: Telangana
- District: Vikarabad
- Elevation: 496 m (1,627 ft)

Languages
  - Official: Telugu, Urdu
- Time zone: UTC+5:30 (IST)
- Vehicle registration: TG

Peddemul is a village in Vikarabad district of the Indian state of Telangana. It is located in Peddemul mandal of Tandur revenue division.

== Geography ==
Peddemul is located at 17.3333°N 77.6667°E. It has an average elevation of 496 meters (1,627 ft). Peddemul's major crops sugar-cane, Red gram
