= Anantha Padmanabha Swamy Temple =

Anandha Padmanabha Swamy Temple is a Hindu temple in India. It is located within the Kulattur taluk of Pudukottai district of the state of Tamil Nadu and is a lesser known one of the 108 Divya Desams dedicated to the Hindu deity Anantha Padmanabhaswamy (Vishnu). It dates back roughly to the late eighth or early ninth century AD. The temple is known for two rock cut temples, one dedicated to Shiva and the other to Vishnu. There is a huge underground behind the 6th room. It is directly connected to kings palace.

== See also ==
- Badami Cave Temples
- List of rock-cut temples in India
