= Bantwaram =

- Village
- Country: India
- State: Telangana
- District: Vikarabad
- Talukas: Bantwaram

Languages
  - Official: Telugu
- Time zone: UTC+5:30 (IST)
- Vehicle registration: TG

Bantwaram is a village in Vikarabad district of the Indian state of Telangana. It is located in Bantwaram mandal of Vikarabad revenue division.
