= Pudur, Vikarabad district =

Pudur
- Village
- Country: India
- State: Telangana
- District: Vikarabad

Languages
  - Official: Telugu
- Time zone: UTC+5:30 (IST)
- PIN: 501401
- Vehicle registration: TG

Pudur is a village in Vikarabad district of the Indian state of Telangana. It is located in Pudur mandal of Vikarabad revenue division.

== Election Information ==
- Sarpanch Election Results in 1994-1999 - NallaBapani NarsimhaReddy (TDP)
- Sarpanch Election Results in 2000-2005 - Singarenibai Sugunamma (TDP)
- Sarpanch Election Results in 2006-2011 - NallaBapani NarsimhaReddy (TDP)
- Sarpanch Election Results in 2013 - Kola Sravanthi Venkatesh (INC)
