= Bomraspeta mandal =

Bomraspeta
- village
- Country: India
- State: Telangana
- District: Vikarabad

Languages
  - Official: Telugu
- Time zone: UTC+5:30 (IST)
- Vehicle registration: AP22
- Vidhan Sabha constituency: Kodangal
- Climate: hot (Köppen)

Bomraspeta is a Mandal in Vikarabad district, Telangana. There is a police staion in Bomraspeta town.

== Institutions ==
- Zilla Parishad High School

== Villages ==
The villages in Bomraspeta mandal include:

- Amsanpalle
- Bapally Tanda
- Bomraspeta
- Burhanpur
- Chilmalmailwar
- Chowdapalle
- Dudyal
- Dupcherla
- Erlapally
- Erpumalla
- Gouraram
- Hakimpeta
- Janakampally
- Kothur
- Lagcherla
- Lingampalle
- Madanapally
- Mahanthipur
- Metlakunta
- Nagereddipalle
- Namdapur
- Polepalle
- Regadimailwar
- Salimdapur
- Thunkumetla
- Wadcherla
- Yenkepally
- Suryanaik tanda
