= Nawabpet, Vikarabad district =

Nawabpet
- village
- Location in Telangana, India Nawabpet (India)
- Coordinates: 17°25′40″N 77°57′45″E
- Country: India
- State: Telangana
- District: Vikarabad
- Talukas: Nawabpet

Population (2011)
  - Total: 1,246

Languages
  - Official: Telugu
- Time zone: UTC+5:30 (IST)
- Vehicle registration: TS-34
- Website: telangana.gov.in

Nawabpet is a village in Vikarabad district of the Indian state of Telangana. It is located in Nawabpet mandal of Vikarabad revenue division.

== Geography ==
Nawabpet Mandal is located at (17.436654, 77.962911).
