= Doulatabad, Mahbubnagar =

Doulatabad
- mandal
- Location in Telangana, India Doulatabad (India)
- Coordinates: 17.000°N 77.5667°E
- Country: India
- State: Telangana
- District: Vikarabad
- Elevation: 543 m (1,781 ft)

Languages
  - Official: Telugu
- Time zone: UTC+5:30 (IST)
- Vehicle registration: TS-34
- Vidhan Sabha constituency: Kodangal
- Climate: hot (Köppen)
- Website: telangana.gov.in

Doulatabad or Daulatabad is a Mandal in Vikarabad District, Telangana. After October 2016, Telangana state Government has been Reorganized the Districts. So Doultabad mandal merged into mahaboobnagar district to Vikarabad district.

== Geography ==
Daulatabad is located at 17.0000°N 77.5667°E. It has an average elevation of 543 metres (1784 ft).
