= Yalal =

Coordinates: 17°12′51″N 77°38′20″E

- Village
- Interactive map of Yalal
- Country: India
- State: Telangana
- District: Vikarabad
- Talukas: Yalal

Languages
  - Official: Telugu, Urdu
- Time zone: UTC+5:30 (IST)

Yalal is a village in Yalal Mandal in Vikarabad District in the state of Telangana in India.
