= Ananthagiri Hills, Vikarabad district =

Hills in Telangana, India

Ananthagiri Hills
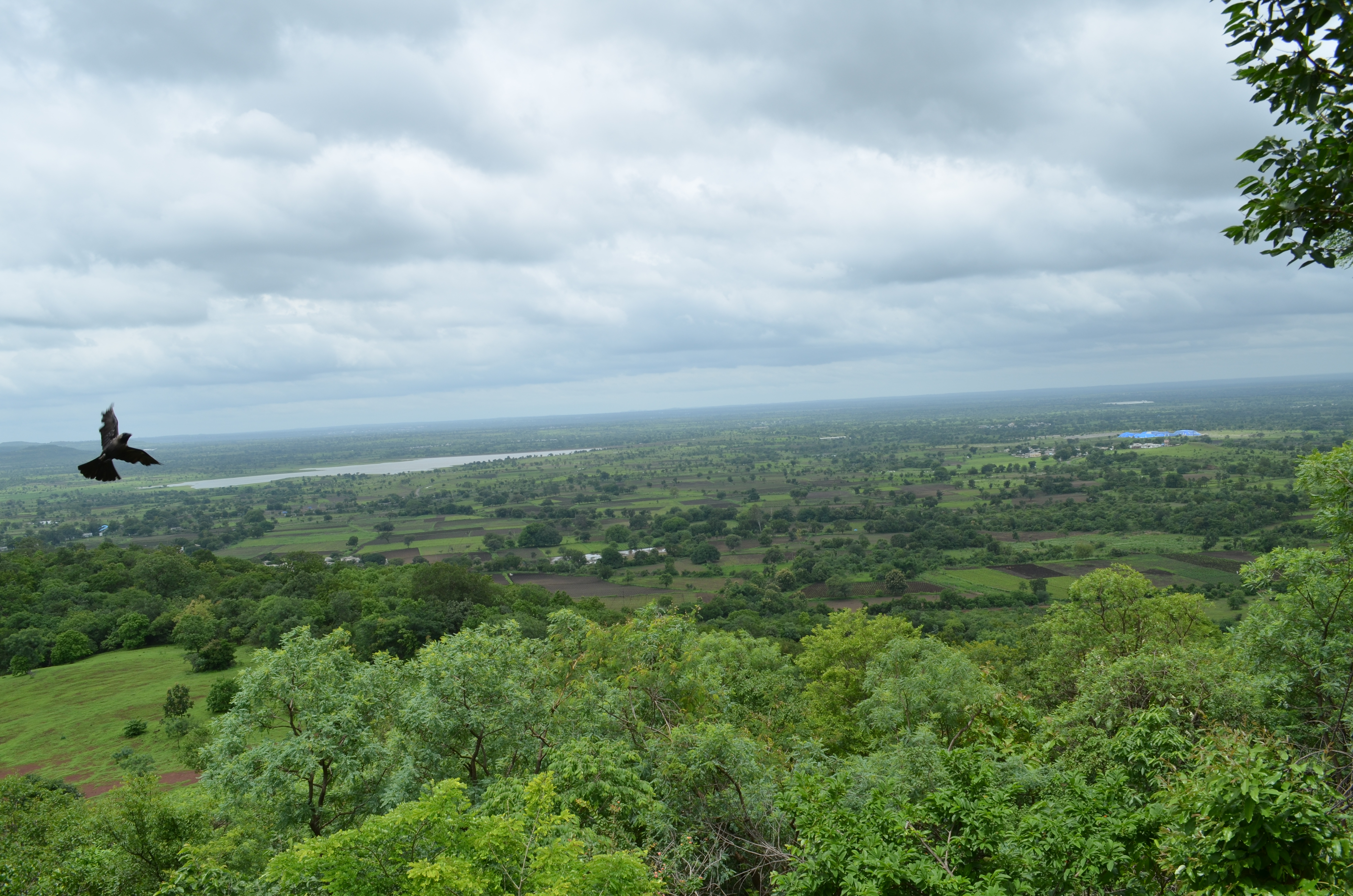
- View from Ananthagiri Hills

Highest point
- Coordinates: 17°18′43″N 77°51′47″E

Naming
- Language of name: Sanskrit

Geography
- Location within Telangana
- Location: Telangana, India

Climbing
- Easiest route: Hyderabad

Ananthagiri Hills is located in Vikarabad district, Telangana, India. The water flows from these hills to Osman Sagar, also known as Gandipet lake, and Himayathsagar.

It is one of the dense forests in Telangana. Flowers at Ananthagiri Hills, in Rangareddy district of Telangana, India, include teak (Tectona grandis). Ananthagiri Temple is located in this forested area. It is the birthplace of Musi river, also called as Muchkunda River, which flows through Hyderabad, 5 km from Vikarabad.

Nature view at Ananthagiri Hills

Way To Ananthagiri Hills

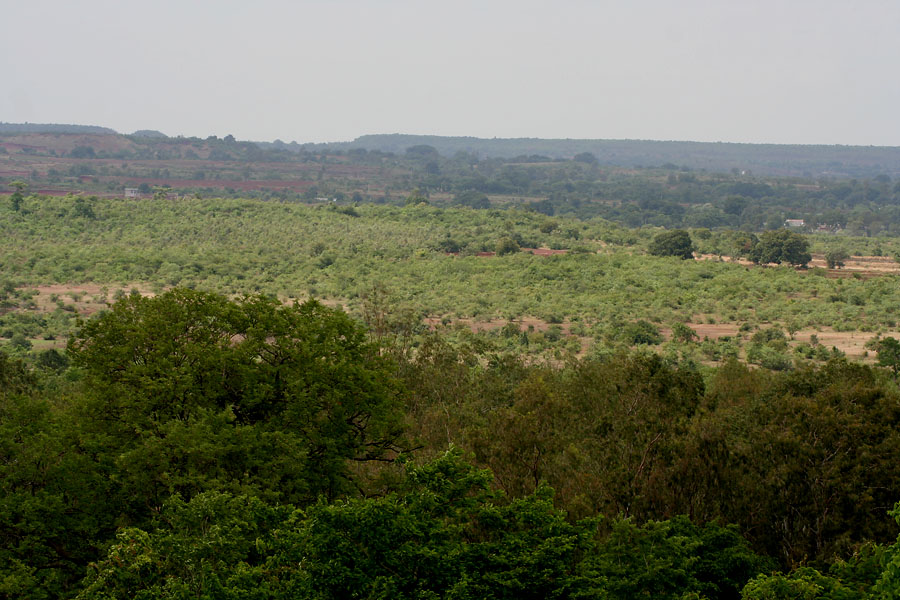
Ananthagiri forest

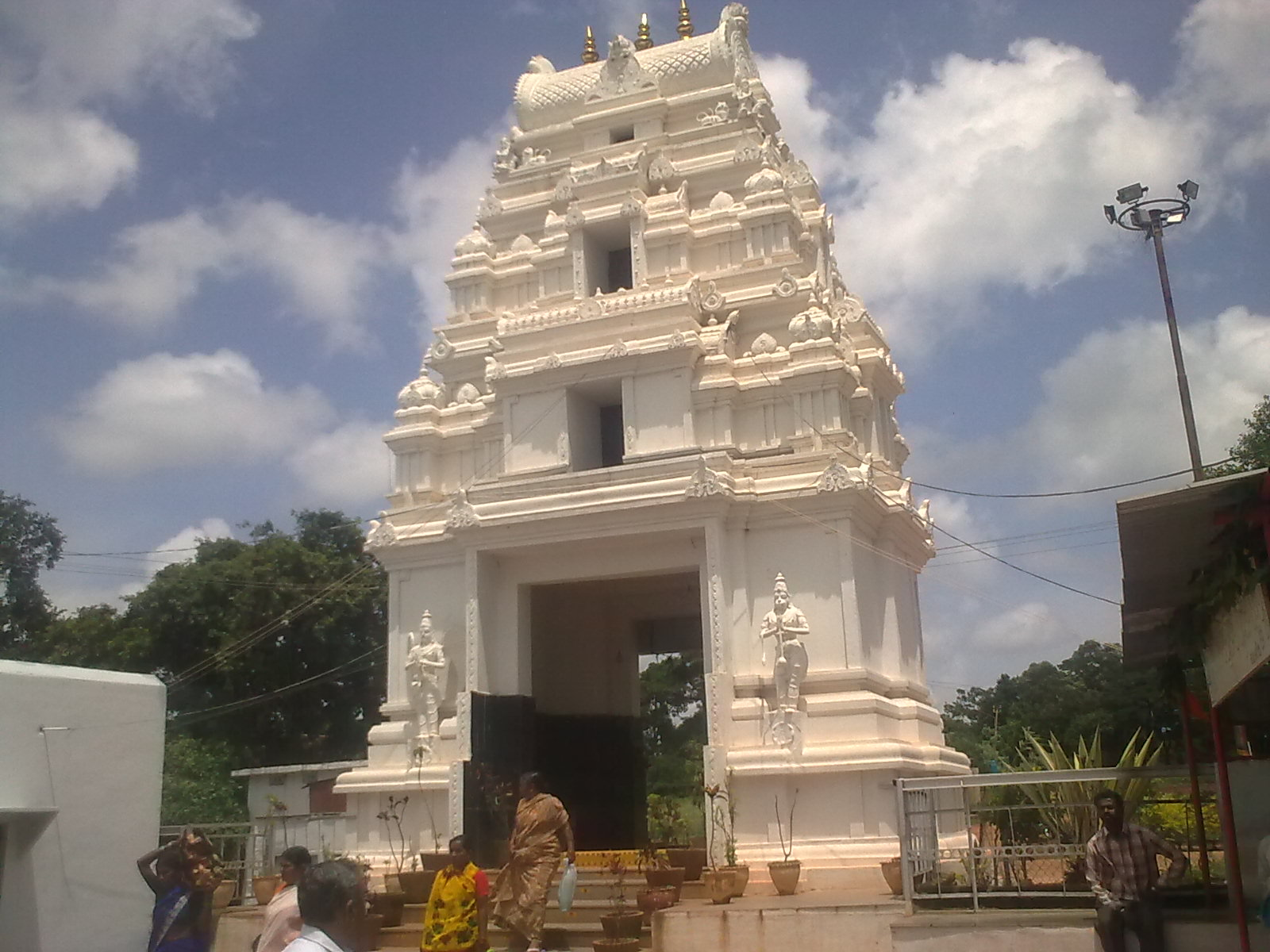
Anantha Padmanabhaswamy Temple

== Musi River ==
The Musi River, originates in Ananthagiri Hills 90 kilometers to the west of Hyderabad and flowed due east for almost all of its course. It joins the Krishna River at Wadapally in Nalgonda district after covering a total distance of about 240 km.

== Landmarks ==
=== Anantha Padmanabha Swamy Temple ===
This temple is located in Ananthagiri hills, about 75 kilometers from Hyderabad. Vishnu is in the form of Sri Anantha Padmanabha Swamy and Ananthagiri is named after him. There is also a hotel near this temple which is operated by the Telangana Government.

=== Nagasamudram Lake ===
Near the temple, there is this lake called Nagasamudram Lake or Kotepally Reservoir, which is located about 20 km from Ananthagiri Hills. The reservoir is linked to the Kotipally Vagu project, an earthen dam.

=== Hiking trails ===
There are two trekking trails in the forests, one that begins from the Anantha Padmanabha Swamy Temple and another that begins about 0.5 kilometres from the temple, towards Kerelli.
