= Hanamkonda mandal =

Hanumakonda mandal town
- Mandal
- Country: India
- State: Telangana
- District: Hanumakonda district
- Headquarters: Hanumakonda

Population (2011)
  - Total: 427,303

Languages
  - Official: Telugu
- Time zone: UTC+5:30 (IST)
- Vehicle registration: TS
- Website: telangana.gov.in

Hanumakonda mandal is one of the 14 mandals in Hanumakonda district of the Indian state of Telangana. It has thousand pillar temple and public garden.

Many institutes, coaching centers and hospitals are in Hanumakonda.

== Villages/Areas ==
- Kumarpally
- Hanumakonda
- Palivelpula
- Lashkar Singaram
- Gopalpur
- Waddepally
