= Mominpet =

- Mandal Head Quarters
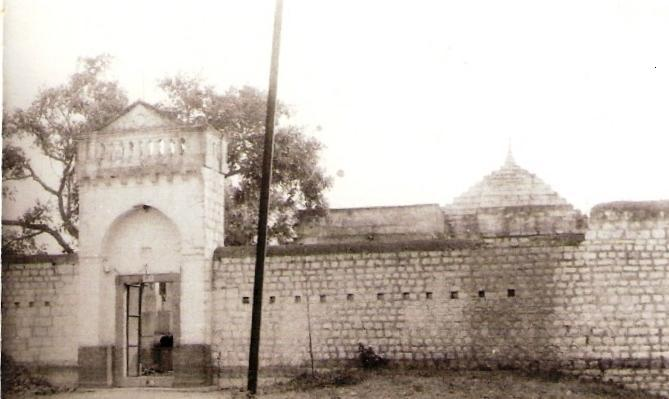

- Location in Telangana, India Mominpet (India)
- Coordinates: 17°31′00″N 77°53′50″E
- Country: India
- State: Telangana
- District: Vikarabad
- Talukas: Mominpet

Languages
  - Official: Telugu
- Time zone: UTC+5:30 (IST)
- PIN: 501202
- Vehicle registration: TG

Mominpet is a village in Vikarabad district of the Indian state of Telangana. It is located in Mominpet mandal of Vikarabad revenue division.
