= Kulkacherla =

Kulkacharla
- village
- Nickname: KCL
- Location within Telangana Location within India
- Coordinates: 17.016°N 77.873°E
- Country: India
- State: Telangana
- District: Vikarabad
- Taluka: Pargi

Government
  - Body: Gram Panchayat Sarpanch: Varwala Anjilayya

Population
  - Total: 8,000 (estimate)

Languages
  - Official: Telugu
- Time zone: UTC+5:30 (IST)
- Postal code: 509335
- Telephone code: 08542
- Vehicle registration: TG 34
- Website: telangana.gov.in vikarabad.telangana.gov.in

Kulkacherla is a village & mandal headquarters in Vikarabad district of the Indian state of Telangana. Most of the population here is dependent on agriculture.

== Administration ==
Prior to re-organisation of districts in Telangana, Kulkacherla mandal was a part of Rangareddy district. It falls under the Pargi Assembly constituency and the Chevella Lok Sabha constituency. TRS, INC and BJP are the major political parties here.

== Places of interest ==
Pambanda Ramalingeswara temple, which is 2 km away from Kulkacherla, is a holy place for Hindus.

== Transportation ==
It is well connected to the state capital Hyderabad (90 kilometers) and other nearby towns (Mahbubnagar, Shadnagar, Vikarabad, Tandur, Pargi, Chevella, Shamshabad, Kosgi and Kodangal) by road. Nearest railway stations are Mahbubnagar (38 km), Vikarabad (40 km), Shadnagar (42 km) and Tandur (50 km). It is 80 km far from the Rajiv Gandhi International Airport, Shamshabad.
