= Domah mandal =

Doma
- mandal
- Location in Telangana, India Doma (India)
- Coordinates: 17.0833°N 77.8333°E
- Country: India
- State: Telangana
- District: Vikarabad
- Elevation: 558 m (1,831 ft)

Languages
  - Official: Telugu
- Time zone: UTC+5:30 (IST)
- Vehicle registration: TS-28
- Website: telangana.gov.in

Domah or Doma is a mandal in Vikarabad district of Telangana, India.

== Geography ==
Domah is located at 17.0833°N 77.8333°E. It has an average elevation of 558 meters (1833 feet).

== Villages ==
Doma consists of 49 Villages and 21 Panchayats. Ananthareddipalle is the smallest village and Mothkur is the biggest village. It is in the 547 m elevation. It is on the border of the Rangareddi District and Mahbubnagar District. Mahbubnagar District Bomraspeta is west towards this place.

=== Panchayats ===
Ainapur Bachpally, Badampally, Bompally, Brahmanpally, Budlapur, Dadapur, Dirsampally, Doma, Sanjeev nagar, Dornalpally, Gudur, Gumdal, Kistapur, Mailaram, Mallepally, Mothukur, Ootpally, Palepally, Rakonda Sivareddypall, Pothireddy pally.
