= Tandur =

- Town Municipal
- Tandur (Telangana) Tandur (India)
- Coordinates: 17.257600°N 77.587500°E
- Country: India
- State: Telangana
- District: Vikarabad District
- Established: 1950

Government
  - Body: Municipal Council
  - MLA: Buyyani Manohar Reddy

Area
  - Total: 21.5 km^{2} (8.3 sq mi)
- Elevation: 486 m (1,594 ft)

Population (2021)
  - Total: 87,859
  - Density: 4,090/km^{2} (10,600/sq mi)

Languages
  - Official: Telugu&Urdu
- Time zone: UTC+5:30 (IST)
- PIN: 501141
- Area code: 08411
- Vehicle registration: TG 34
- Planning agency: Municipal Council Tandur (MCT)
- Civic agency: Municipal council
- Lok Sabha constituency: Chevella
- Assembly constituency: Tandur
- Deputy Superintendent of Police: Shekar Goud
- Website: telangana.gov.in

Tandur is a town, municipality and mandal in Vikarabad district in the Indian state of Telangana. It is a municipality consisting of 36 wards, as well as the headquarters of Tandur mandal in the Tandur Revenue Division. It is known for its production of limestone, cement, and redgram (pigeon pea). Drinking water is sourced from the River Kagna, a tributary of the Bhima River, which is 4 km from the town. The town’s namesake Tandur Redgram (pigeon pea) has been awarded the Geographical Indication (GI) tag by the Central Department of Commerce and Industry.

== History ==
Tandur has a very different History, as some sources say that during the battle between the Qutub Shahi Dynasty and Mogul Dynasty the army of Mogul Dynasty passed through Tandur to besiege of Golconda Fort of Hyderabad. Its thought that the Nizams of Hyderabad used to visit Tandur for hunting. A local grandee, Yusuf Seth used to arrange a grand welcome to the Nizam of Hyderabad. The rich vegetation and varied wildlife were an attraction, but now deforestation has denuded the wildlife. The old houses of Tandur city were built of mud walls and stones slabs on wooden supports. The railway track divides old and new Tandur. There are still some remnants of the fortification of Tandur during the period of Nizam of Hyderabad known as "Naubath Khana" situated in the Old Tandur.

== Transport ==
The major railway station is located on the Secunderabad & Hyderabad – Wadi section of the Mumbai route. It is connected with neighbouring towns like Zaheerabad (60 km), Sangareddy (95 km), and Vikarabad (40 km) through roads and railways.

Various buses are being served by TSRTC from Tandur to towns like Narayanpet, Vikarabad, Sadasivpet, Sangareddy, Zaheerabad, Kodangal, Kosgi, Chevella, Chincholi & cities like Mahbubnagar, Mumbai and Hyderabad.

== Demographics ==
According to the 2011 Indian census, Tandur had a population of 71,008, including 35,695 males and 35,310 females. The literacy rate is 78% (80.07% for men, 76.03% for women), which is higher than the state average of 67.02%.

== Economy ==
Industries in Tandur include blue, green, and yellow-colored limestone that can be used for flooring, wall cladding, and slabs. The town is known for cement factories, including the India Cements Limited (ICL), Cement Corporation of India (CCI), Penna Cements, Chettinad Cements, and Vicat Sagar. The cement industry, stone mines, quarries, pigeon pea(kandikaya in tandur) cultivation, and transportation are the main sources of employment.

== Geographical indication ==
Tandur Redgram was awarded the Geographical Indication (GI) status tag from the Geographical Indications Registry, under the Union Government of India, on 6 December 2022.

Yalal Farmers Producer Company Limited from Vikarabad, proposed the GI registration of 'Tandur Redgram'. After filing the application in September 2020, the Pigeon pea was granted the GI tag in 2022 by the Geographical Indication Registry in Chennai, making the name "Tandur Redgram" exclusive to the Pigeon pea cultivated in the region. It thus became the first pigeon pea variety from Telangana and the 17th type of goods from Telangana to earn the GI tag.

The GI tag protects the Tandur Redgram from illegal selling and marketing, and gives it legal protection and a unique identity.

== Members of Legislative Assembly ==
Duration	Member	Political party
1962–67	Marri Chenna Reddy	Indian National Congress
1967–72	Marri Chenna Reddy	Indian National Congress
1972–78	M. Manik Rao	Indian National Congress
1978–83	M. Manik Rao	Indian National Congress
1983–85	M. Manik Rao	Indian National Congress
1985–89	M. Chandra Shaker	Indian National Congress
1989–94	M. Chandra Shaker	Indian National Congress
1994–99	P. Mahender Reddy	Telugu Desam Party
1999–04	P. Mahender Reddy	Telugu Desam Party
2004–09	Malkud Narayan Rao	Indian National Congress
2009–14	P. Mahender Reddy	Telugu Desam Party
2014–2018	P. Mahender Reddy	Telangana Rashtra Samithi
2018–Incumbent	Pilot Rohith Reddy	Indian National Congress
2019-2023	Pilot Rohith Reddy	Bharat Rashtra Samithi
2023-Incumbent	Buyyani Manohar Reddy	Indian National Congress

== Members of Parliament ==
Duration	Member	Political party
2014-19	Konda Vishweshwar Reddy	Telangana Rashtra Samithi
2019-24	G. Ranjith Reddy	Bharat Rashtra Samithi
2024-Incumbent	Konda Vishweshwar Reddy	Bharatiya Janata Party

== See also ==
- Tandur railway station
