= Vikarabad district =

Vikarabad district Gangawaram district
- District of Telangana
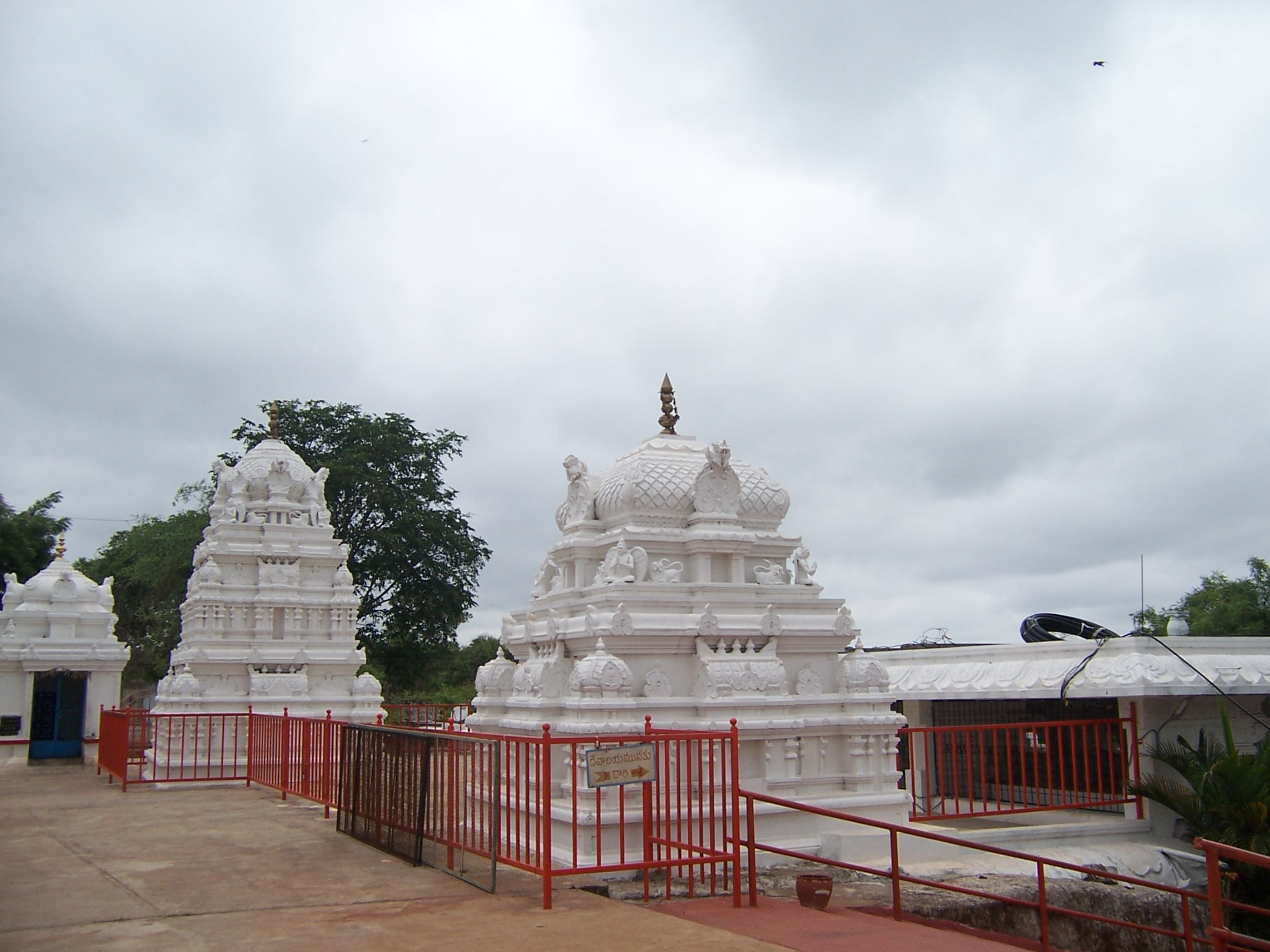
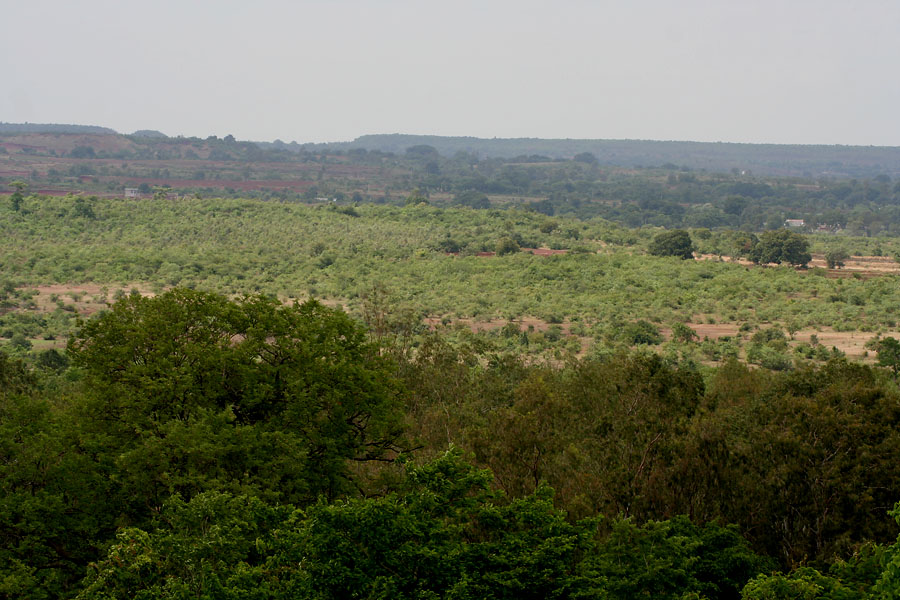
- Top: Anantha Padmanabha Swamy Temple; Bottom: Ananatagiri Hills

- Location in Telangana
- Vikarabad district
- Country: India
- State: Telangana
- District: Vikarabad
- Established: 11-10-2016
- Headquarters: Vikarabad
- Mandalas: 20

Government
  - District collector: Prateek Jain I.A.S.
  - Parliamentary constituencies: Chevella, Mahbubnagar
  - Assembly constituencies: Vikarabad, Tandur Parigi, Kodangal, Chevella(part)

Area
  - Total: 3,386.00 km^{2} (1,307.34 sq mi)

Population (2011)
  - Total: 927,140
  - Density: 273.82/km^{2} (709.18/sq mi)
- Time zone: UTC+05:30 (IST)
- Vehicle registration: TG–34
- Website: vikarabad.telangana.gov.in

Vikarabad district, formerly known as Gangawaram, is a district in the Indian state of Telangana. Vikarabad is the headquarters of the district. Vikarabad is located in western part of telangana state.Vikarabad shares boundaries with Sangareddy, Mahabubnagar, Narayanpet, and Ranga Reddy districts and the state boundary of Karnataka.

== History ==
The ancient name of Vikarabad was Gangawaram. Vikarabad was named after the fifth Paigah Amir (Premier noble) H.E. Nawab Sir Vikar-ul-Umrah Bahadur, Sikander Jung, Iqbal-ud-Daula and Iqtadar-ul-Mulk, Nawab Muhammed Fazaluddin Khan KCIE, who served as prime minister of Hyderabad State and Berar Province between 1893 and 1901.

Nawab Sir Vicar-ul-Umrah was the younger son of Nawab Rasheeduddin Khan Bahadur, Shams ul Umra, Amir e Kabir IÌI, Amir e Paigah IV and Co-Regent of Hyderabad. He built three palaces and mansions in Vikarabad, The Vikar Manzil Palace (which presently houses the deputy collector/RDO Office and still belongs to the Paigah family heirs), Sultan Manzil Palace named after his eldest son and heir, H.E. Nawab Sultan ul Mulk Bahadur the last full Amir of Vicar ul Umrahi Paigah and the "Vicar Shikargah" which he later presented as nazar or offering to his brother in law and nephew, H.H.Nawab Mir Mahboob Ali Khan, the VIth Nizam of Hyderabad.

Sir Vikar's Jagir Vikarabad, Dharur and Ananthagiri hills where know to be mini hill station of the Deccan. He died in 1902 and is buried at the Paigah Tombs at Hyderabad.

Vikarabad is well known for producing highly skilled Real estate tycoons.

== Geography ==
The district is spread over an area of 3,386.00 square kilometres (1,307.34 sq mi). This district is bounded by Sangareddy district in the north, Ranga Reddy district in the east, Mahbubnagar district in the south and Karnataka in the west.

Languages of Vikarabad district (2011)
1. Telugu (75.2%)
2. Urdu (12.9%)
3. Lambadi (9.97%)
4. Others (1.90%)

== Administrative divisions ==
The district will have two revenue divisions of Tandur and Vikarabad. It is sub-divided into 20 mandals. Narayana Reddy Garu I.A.S. is the present collector of the district.

=== Mandals ===
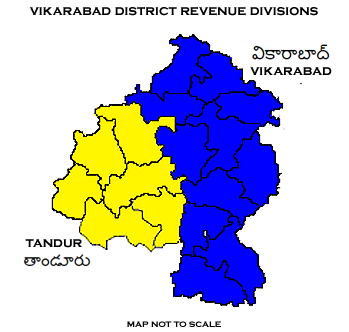
Sangareddy District Revenue divisions

S.No.	Vikarabad revenue division	S.No.	Tandur revenue division
1	Marpalle	13	Peddemul
2	Mominpet	14	Yelal
3	Nawabpet	15	Kodangal
4	Vikarabad	16	Bommaraspet
5	Pudur	17	Basheerabad
6	Kulkacherla	18	Doulthabad
7	Doma	19	Tandur
8	Pargi	20	Dudyal
9	Dharur		
10	Kotepally		
11	Bantwaram		
12	Chowdapur		

== Villages ==
- Turmamidi

== See also ==
- List of districts in Telangana
