= Parigi, Vikarabad district =

Parigi
- Town municipality
- Location in Telangana, India Parigi (India)
- Coordinates: 17.1833°N 77.8833°E
- Country: India
- State: Telangana
- District: Vikarabad

Government
  - Body: municipality
  - Commissioner: G.Teji
- Elevation: 526 m (1,726 ft)

Population (2011)
  - Total: 32,502
  - Density: 201.5/km^{2} (522/sq mi)

Languages
  - Official: Telugu , Urdu
- Time zone: UTC+5:30 (IST)
- Postal code: 501501
- Telephone code: 08412
- Vehicle registration: TG-34
- Sex ratio: 956 ♂/♀

Parigi is a town and municipality in the Vikarabad district of the Indian state of Telangana. It is located in Parigi mandal of Vikarabad Revenue division

== Geography ==
Pargi is at 17.1833°N 77.8833°E. It has an average elevation of about 526 m (1,726 ft), and is 68 km from Hyderabad. It relies entirely on ground water, but has an ample supply of it, sustaining a farming industry exploiting its fertile, black soil. The major crops are cotton, maize, and Jowar, and there are also many mango groves.

Parigi has recently been recognised as a municipal corporation by the government of Telangana, Tirumala and Jersey.

== Location ==
Parigi is located some 66 km west of Hyderabad, and is 60 km from the city's outer ring road, 66 km from Shamshabad Airport, 38 km from Shadnagar, 36 km from Chevella and 18 km from Vikarabad.

== Transport links ==
=== Road ===
The town is accessible via the new Hyderabad-Bijapur-Goa National Highway NH-163. The NH-44 Link road passes by Pargi-Shadnagar.

=== Rail ===
The nearest railway stations are Vikarabad Railway Junction (about 18 km away), Shadnagar Station (about 38 km away) and Hyderabad Deccan(nampally) (about 76 km away).

=== Air ===
The nearest airport is Rajiv Gandhi International Airport-Hyderabad, about 67 km away.
