= Chevella mandal =

Chevella Mandal
- Mandal
- Location in Telangana, India Chevella Mandal (India)
- Coordinates: 17.3067°N 78.1353°E
- Country: India
- State: Telangana
- District: Rangareddy
- City: Hyderabad, India
- Headquarter: Chevella

Government
  - MP: Konda Vishweshwar Reddy
  - MLA: Kale Yadaiah
- Elevation: 623 m (2,044 ft)

Population
  - Total: 63,983 (Total mandal)

Languages Telugu Urdu
  - Official: Telugu
- Time zone: UTC+5:30 (IST)
- PIN: 501 203, 501501, 501503, 501504, 509217
- Vehicle registration: TS 07
- Planning agency: Hyderabad Metropolitan Development Authority
- Civic agency: Gram panchayat
- Lok Sabha constituency: Chevella
- Vidhan Sabha constituency: Chevella

Chevella mandal is one of the 27 mandals in Rangareddy district of the Indian state of Telangana. It is under the administration of Chevella revenue division and the headquarters are located at Chevella town.the near by villages are urella, aloor etc. The mandal is bounded by Shabad, Moinabad, Shankarpally and Pudur mandals.

== Villages ==
- Chevella Municipality
  - Chevella
  - Pamena
  - Kandawada
  - Palgutta
  - Mallareddy Guda
  - Damargidda
  - Devuni Erravally
  - Malkapur
  - Kesaram
  - Orella
  - Ramannaguda
  - Ibrahipalle
- Grama panchayats
  - 1 Allawada
  - 2 Aloor
  - 3 Antawaram
  - 4 Bastepur
  - 5 Chanvelly
  - 6 Devarampalli
  - 7 Gollapally
  - 8 Gundala
  - 9 Hasthepur
  - 10 Kammeta
  - 11 Khanapur
  - 12 Kowkuntla
  - 13 Kummera
  - 14 Mirjaguda
  - 15 Mudimyal
  - 16 Naincheru
  - 17 Nyalata
  - 18 Ravulapally (Khurd)
  - 19 Regadi ghanapur
  - 20 Tallaram
  - 21 Tangedapally
  - 22 Yenkepalle

== MPTC ==
- 1 Aloor-I MPTC
  - Aloor part
- 2 Aloor-II MPTC
  - Aloor part
- 3 Antharam MPTC
  - Antharam
  - Kowkuntla
  - Hastepur
- 4 Chanvelly MPTC
  - Bastepur
  - Chanvelly
  - Mirjaguda
- 5 Gundala MPTC
  - Gundal
  - Allawada
- 6 Khanapur MPTC
  - Khanapur
  - Nancheru
  - Regadi ghanapur
  - Devarampally
- 7 Mudimyal MPTC
  - Mudimyal
  - Ravulapally
  - Kummera
  - Gollapally
- 8 Nyalata MPTC
  - Nyalata
  - Singappaguda
  - Tallaram
- 9 Thangadpally MPTC
  - Thangadpally
- 10 Yenkepally MPTC
  - Yenkepally
  - Eerlapally
  - Kammeta
  - Gollaguda
