= Chirag (disambiguation) =

Chirag is a 1969 Indian Bollywood film directed by Raj Khosla.

Chirag or Chiragh may also refer to:

== People ==
- Chiragh Ali (1844–1895), Indian Muslim scholar
- Chirag Ali Shah (died 1983), Indo-Fijian farmer and politician
- Chirag Gandhi (born 1990), Indian first-class cricketer
- Chirag Jain (born 1985), Indian poet, satirist, humourist and author
- Chirag Jani (cricketer) (born 1989), Indian cricketer
- Chirag Jani (actor), Indian actor
- Chirag Khurana (born 1992), Indian cricketer
- Chiragh Kumar, Indian professional golfer
- Chirag Odhav, American youth volunteer
- Chirag Parmar (born 1990), Indian cricketer
- Chirag Paswan, Indian politician
- Chirag Pathak (born 1987), Indian first-class cricketer
- Chirag Patil (born 1993), Indian actor
- Chirag Pratap Lingam Goud a.k.a. Pedhanna (1921–1982), former MLA in Andhra Pradesh
- Chirag Shetty (born 1997), Indian badminton player
- Chirag Suri (born 1995), Indian cricketer
- Chirag Vohra, Indian television, stage and film actor

== Geography ==
- Chirag Delhi metro station, Delhi, India
- Chirag, Republic of Dagestan, rural locality in Agulsky District, Republic of Dagestan
- Chirag Gala, a ruined ancient fortress near Baku, Azerbaijan
- Chirag oil field, an offshore oil field in the Caspian Sea

== Other ==
- Chirag language, a language spoken in Dagestan, Russia
- Chirag United Sports Club, an Indian football Club from Kolkata, West Bengal, India
- Chirag Gupta, a fictional character in the Diary of a Wimpy Kid book series
