= Gollapalle =

Gollapalle, Gollapalli or Gollapally is the name of several places in India and is a Telugu surname:

== Places ==
- Gollapalli, Eluru district a village in Eluru district, Andhra Pradesh
- Gollapalli, Krishnagiri district is a village in Krishnagiri district, Tamil Nadu
- Gollapally, Ranga Reddy district
- Chinna Gollapally
- Gollapally, Karimnagar, Telangana
- Gollapalle, Duvvur Mandal, Kadapa District

== Surname ==
- Samuel Gollapalle

=== See also ===
- Palli (disambiguation)
