= Anindith Reddy =

Indian racing driver and entrepreneur

- Education: Mechanical Engineering
- Known for: Racing
- Spouse: Shriya Bhupal
- Parents: Konda Vishweshwar Reddy (father); Sangita Reddy (mother)
- Relatives: Prathap C. Reddy (grandfather)

Anindith Reddy is an Indian racing driver. He participated in the 2016 Euro JK 16 Championship and the Euro JK 2017 Championship, and the motorsport person of the year 2017 at the Federation of Motorsports Clubs of India (FMSCI). He won Volkswagen Vento Cup 2015 in Delhi. In 2019, he received outstanding achievement in world motor sport from FMSCI.

== Family ==
Anindith Reddy is born to Sangita Reddy and Konda Vishweshwar Reddy. He is married to Shriya Bhupal, grand daughter of GVK Reddy. He is grandson of Prathap C. Reddy and Konda Madhava Reddy, and great grand son of Konda Venkata Ranga Reddy.

== Racing record ==
=== Career summary ===
Season	Series	Team	Races	Wins	Poles	F/Laps	Podiums	Points	Position
2015-16	MRF Formula 1600 Championship	MRF Racing	?	?	?	?	?	36	**3rd**
2017-18	MRF Formula 1600 Championship	MRF Racing	?	?	?	?	?	121	4th
2018	Lamborghini Super Trofeo Asia - Pro	D1 Racing Team	4	0	0	0	2	36	6th
2018	Lamborghini Super Trofeo Asia - Pro-Am	D1 Racing Team	2	0	0	0	2	24	6th
2022	Indian Racing League	Hyderabad Blackbirds	6	0	0	0	1	48	16th
2023	Indian Racing League	Hyderabad Blackbirds	3	0	0	0	1	38‡	8th‡
2024	Indian Racing League	Hyderabad Blackbirds	5	0	0	0	0	45‡	10th‡

‡ Team standings.

=== Complete Indian Racing League results ===
(key) (Races in bold indicate pole position) (Races in italics indicate fastest lap)

Year	Franchise	1	2	3	4	5	6	7	8	9	10	11	12	Pos.	Pts
2022	Hyderabad Blackbirds	HYD1; 1 C	HYD1; 2 C	HYD1; 3 C	IRU1; 1	IRU1; 2; 4	IRU1; 3 Ret	IRU2; 1	IRU2; 2; 7	IRU2; 3 Ret	HYD2; 1	HYD2; 2 DSQ	HYD2; 3; 3	16th	48
2023‡	Hyderabad Blackbirds	IRU1; 1; 6	IRU1; 2	IRU2; 1	IRU2; 2 Ret	IRU3; 1; 2	IRU3; 2							8th	38
2024‡	Hyderabad Blackbirds	IRU1; 1	IRU1; 2; 9	IGR; 1	IGR; 2 Ret	IRU2; 1	IRU2; 2; 7	KAR1; 1; 5	KAR1; 2	KAR2; 1	KAR2; 2; 6			10th	45

‡ Standings based on entry points, not individual drivers.

* Season in progress.
