= Aloor, Ranga Reddy district =

Aloor
- Village
- Country: India
- State: Telangana
- District: Ranga Reddy

Government
  - Body: Mandal Office

Population (2015 census)
  - Total: 12,000

Languages
  - Official: Telugu
- Time zone: UTC+5:30 (IST)
- Postal code: 501503
- Vehicle registration: TS
- Planning agency: Panchayat
- Civic agency: Mandal Office
- Website: telangana.gov.in

Aloor is a village and panchayat in Ranga Reddy district, Telangana, India. It falls under Chevella mandal. Aloor has a population of 15000. It is not less than a mandal. It is situated 11 km away from Chevella. The nearest city to Aloor is Vikarabad, which is about 18 km away. Aloor has many temples, a mosque, and a church. It is famous for its shops and heritage. The village has very good water deposits. It is well connected through roadways to Chevella and Vikarabad. It has largest land area, so that it is divided into three revenue villages 1.Aloor I, 2.Aloor II and 3.AloorIII. This village has two MPTCs and 14 wards. It also have one hamlet village name Venkannaguda.

It one of the largest villages of Telangana state.
