= 2002 Hyderabad Municipal Corporation election =

- 22 January 2002

All 99 elected seats in the Municipal Corporation of Hyderabad 50 seats needed for a majority
- Turnout: 53%
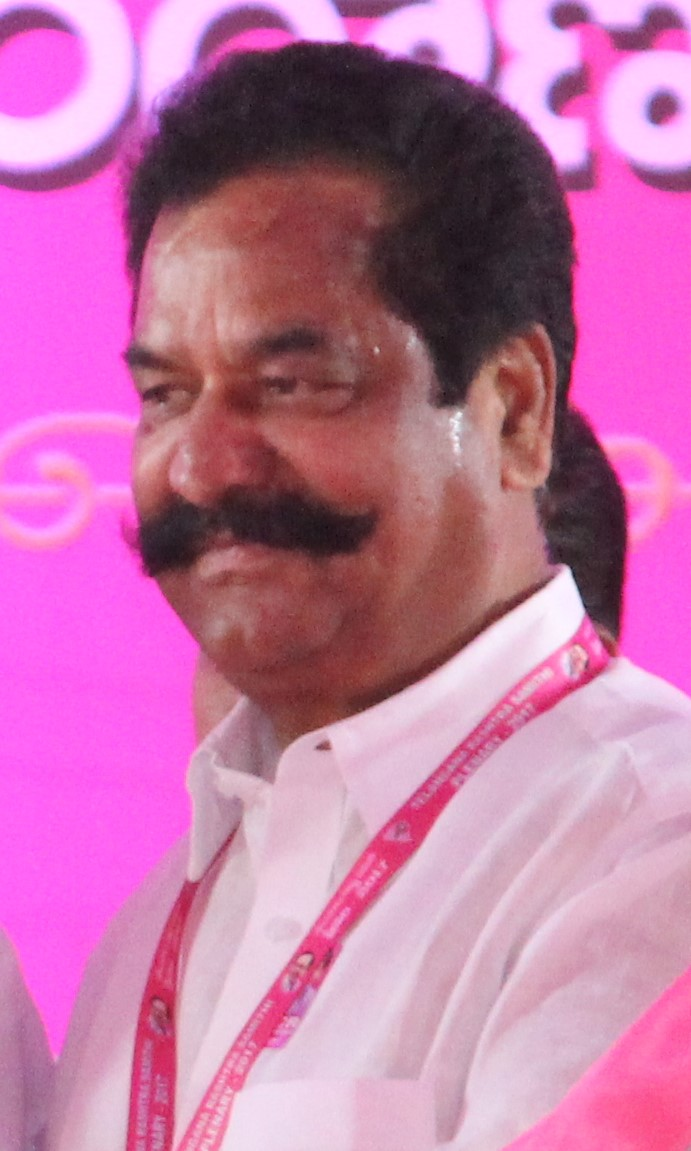

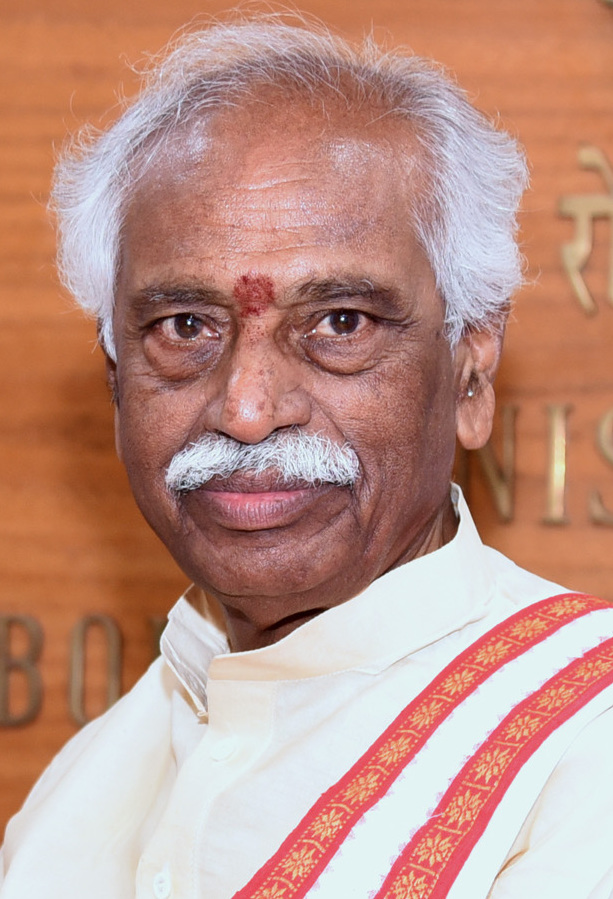
	First party	Second party
	AIMIM
Leader	Mir Zulfiqar Ali	Teegala Krishna Reddy
Party	AIMIM	TDP
Alliance	None	NDA
Seats won	34	22
Swing	▼4	▼2
	Third party	Fourth party
Leader	Danam Nagender	Bandaru Dattatreya
Party	INC	BJP
Alliance	None	NDA
Seats won	19	18
Swing	▼5	▲6
Mayor before election
Mir Zulfiqar Ali
AIMIM
Elected Mayor
Teegala Krishna Reddy
TDP

The 2002 Hyderabad Municipal Corporation election was conducted on 22 January 2002 to elect members to all 99 wards of the municipal corporation. These were the first elections to the corporation in 16 years. Direct elections were held for mayor along with wards. The Telugu Desam Party emerged as victor in the mayoral election with its candidate T. Krishna Reddy defeating runner-up Mir Zulfiqar Ali of AIMIM by 16,000 votes, whereas AIMIM became the single largest party in the corporation.

== Results ==
A total of 1,158,913 votes were polled out of which 1,104,076 were valid and 54,837 were invalid. There were 57 candidates competing for mayor.

Parties and Coalitions	Seats	
Parties and Coalitions	Won	+/-
All India Majlis-e-Ittehadul Muslimeen (AIMIM)	34	▼4
Telugu Desam Party (TDP)	22	▼2
Indian National Congress (INC)	19	▼5
Bharatiya Janata Party (BJP)	18	▲6
Telangana Rashtra Samithi (TRS)	2	▲2
Majlis Bachao Tehreek (MBT)	2	▲2
Telangana Sadhana Samithi (TSS)	1	▲1
Others	1	Steady
Total	99	
Valid votes	1,104,076	
Invalid votes	54,837	
Votes cast	1,158,913	
Turnout	53%	
