= Palnadu Express =

Train in India

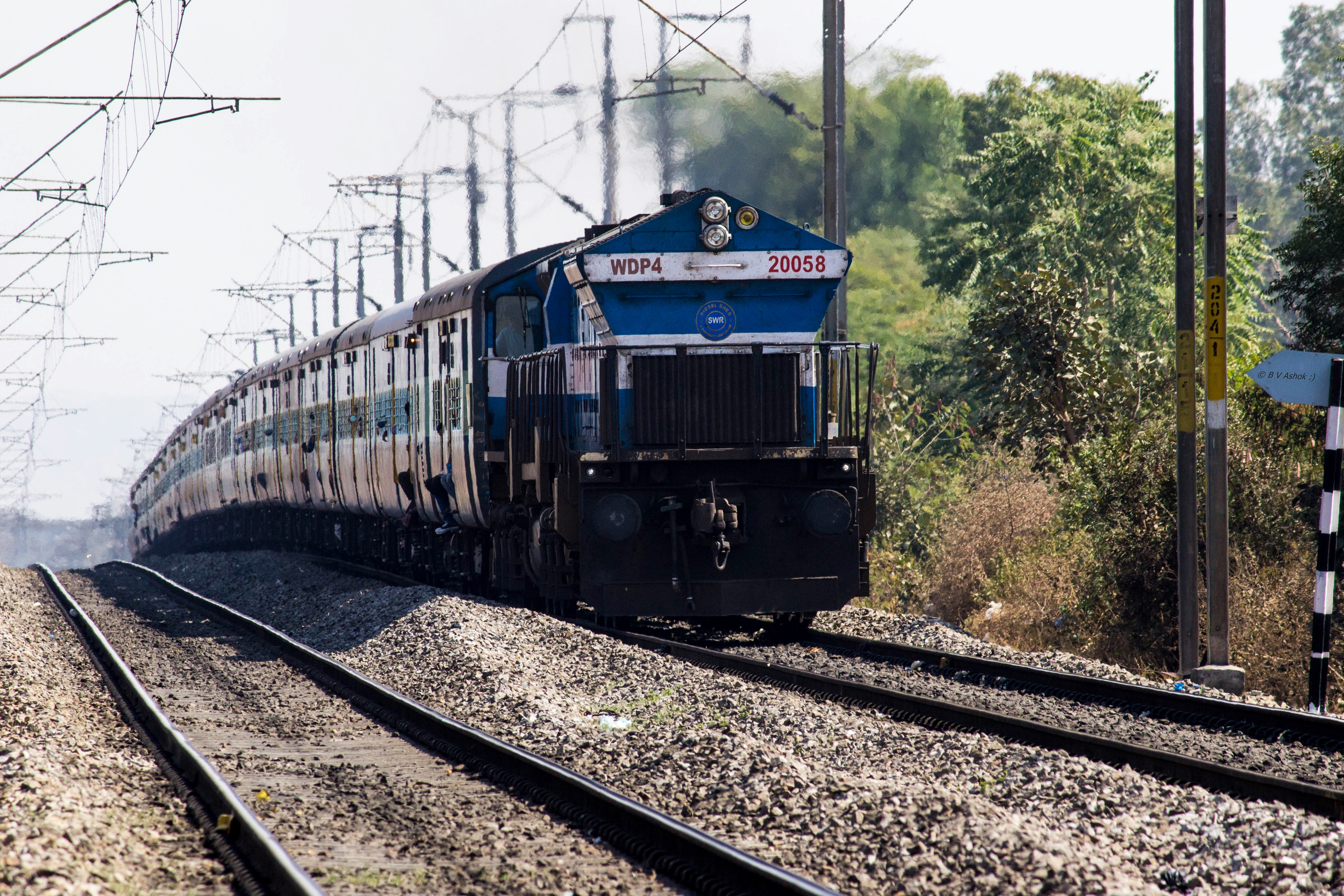

Overview
- Service type: Superfast Express
- Locale: Andhra Pradesh & Telangana
- First service: 16 August 1998; 27 years ago
- Current operator: South Coast Railway

Route
- Termini: Guntur (GNT); Vikarabad (VKB)
- Stops: 13
- Distance travelled: 354 km (220 mi)
- Average journey time: 6 hours 35 minutes
- Service frequency: Daily
- Train number: 12747 / 12748

On-board services
- Classes: AC Chair Car, AC 3 Tier, Second Class Seating, General Unreserved
- Seating arrangements: Yes
- Sleeping arrangements: Yes
- Catering facilities: On-board catering, E-catering
- Observation facilities: Large windows
- Baggage facilities: No
- Other facilities: Below the seats

Technical
- Rolling stock: LHB coach
- Track gauge: 1,676 mm (5 ft 6 in)
- Operating speed: 54 km/h (34 mph) average including halts.
Route map
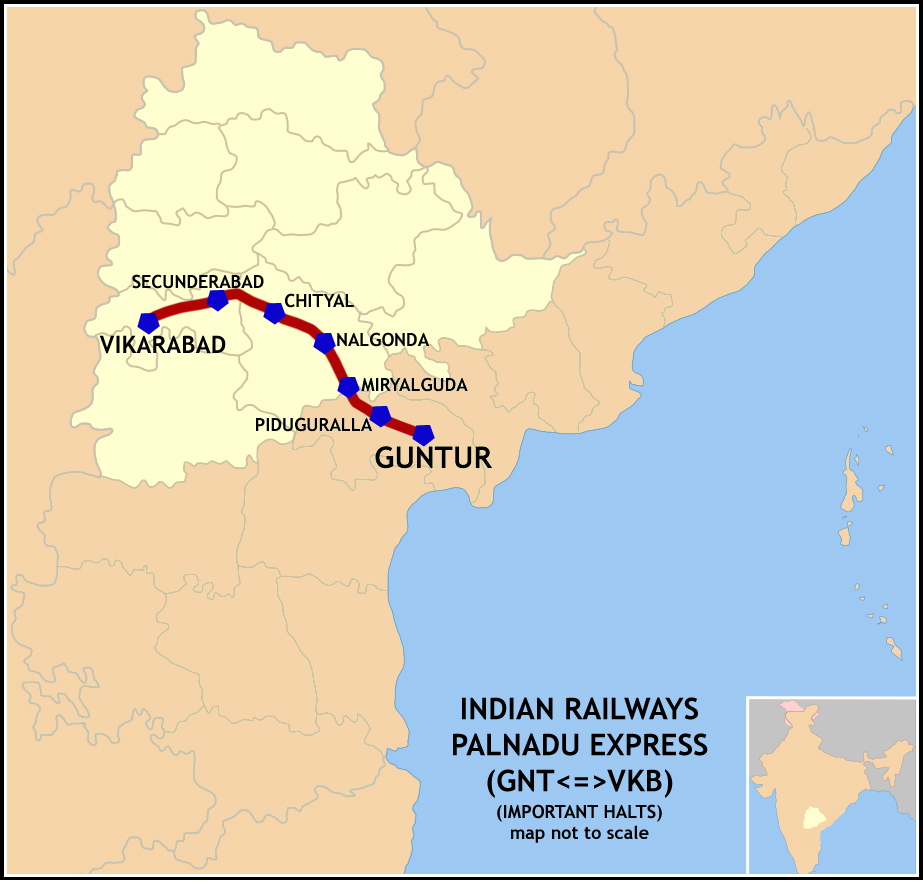

The 12747 / 12748 Palnadu Express is a superfast express train in India which runs between Guntur in Andhra Pradesh and Vikarabad in Telangana. It was introduced on 16 August 1998. This train is named after the Palnadu region in erstwhile Guntur district of Andhra Pradesh. It is the first train in the division to be equipped with foldable wheelchair and ramp for the differently-abled passengers.

== Rake sharing ==
This train shares its rake with Simhadri Express.

== Route and halts ==
The train stops at Sattenapalli, Piduguralla, Nadikude Jn, Miryalaguda, Nalgonda, Chityala, Nagireddipalli, Secunderabad Jn, Begumpet, Sanathnagar, Lingampalli and Shankarpalli.

== Coach composition ==
The 20 coach composition contains– 1 Chair Car,1 3 AC , 6 Second Class Sitting,10 General,1 SLR,1 EOG
It runs with LHB coaches (Green indicating Electric locomotive, Yellow indicating colour of the general coaches, pink indicating reserved coaches and blue indicating AC coaches)
Coach Composition from Guntur to Vikarabad as 12747

Loco	1	2	3	4	5	6	7	8	9	10	11	12	13	14	15	16	17	18	19	20	
	SLR	UR	UR	UR	UR	UR	UR	UR	UR	UR	UR	D4	D3	D2	D1	C1	UR	UR	UR	UR	SLR

Coach Composition from Vikarabad to Guntur as 12748

Loco	1	2	3	4	5	6	7	8	9	10	11	12	13	14	15	16	17	18	19	20	21
	SLR	UR	UR	UR	UR	C1	D1	D2	D3	D4	UR	UR	UR	UR	UR	UR	UR	UR	UR	UR	SLR

== Traction ==
It is hauled by a Lallaguda Loco Shed or Vijayawada Loco Shed-based WAP-7 electric locomotive on its entire journey.

== Amenities ==
In January 2020, it became the first disabled friendly train in India. It is equipped with foldable ramps, that allow pushing of the wheelchairs into the coaches and wheelchairs themselves help passengers with disability to navigate through the coach aisle.

== See also ==
- Express trains in India
