= Palgutta =

- Village
- Nickname: Flower bucket of Cevella
- Country: India
- State: Telangana
- District: Ranga Reddy
- Metro: Rangareddy district

Government
  - Body: Mandal Office
  - Rank: 1

Population
  - Total: 3,000+

Languages
  - Official: Telugu
- Time zone: UTC+5:30 (IST)
- Postal code: 501503
- Planning agency: Panchayat
- Civic agency: Mandal Office

Palgutta is a village and panchayat in Ranga Reddy district, Telangana, India. It falls under Chevella mandal. It has been used as a shooting location for several movies. It is also covered with forest. The village is known for the flowers growing within and around the village. It is the fastest growing village in the Ranga Reddy district located near to Shamshabad.
