= Mudimiyal =

- Village
- Country: India
- State: Andhra Pradesh
- District: Ranga Reddy
- Metro: Rangareddy district

Government
  - Body: Mandal Office

Languages
  - Official: Telugu
- Time zone: UTC+5:30 (IST)
- Planning agency: Panchayat
- Civic agency: Mandal Office

Mudimiyal is a village and panchayat in Ranga Reddy district, AP, India. It falls under Chevella mandal.
