= Kondakal =

Town in Telangana, India

- Census town
- Location in Telangana, India Kondakal (India)
- Coordinates: 17°46′15.4″N 78°18′25.3″E
- Country: India
- State: Telangana
- District: Ranga Reddy

Government
  - Type: State

Area
  - Total: 6.90 km^{2} (2.66 sq mi)

Population (2011)
  - Total: 3,811
  - Density: 552/km^{2} (1,430/sq mi)

Languages
  - Official: Telugu
- Time zone: UTC+5:30 (IST)
- Vehicle registration: TS

Kondakal is a village in Shankarpalli mandal, Ranga Reddy district in the State of Telangana. It is 9 km from Mandal Center Shankarpalli. The nearest town, Sangareddy is 20 km away. In June 2023, India's largest private rail coach factory was inaugurated in Kondakal village. The 100 acres rail coach factory is constructed by Medha Servo Drives Private Limited, a Telangana-based company.
