= Konda Lakshma Reddy =

Indian politician

Member of Telangana Legislative Assembly
- In office 1983 - 1985
- Preceded by: Chirag Pratap Lingam
- Succeeded by: Patlolla Indra Reddy
- Constituency: Chevella

Personal details
- Born: Telangana, India
- Died: 13 October 2025 Hyderabad
- Party: INC

Konda Lakshma Reddy was an Indian politician and former legislator of Andhra Pradesh Legislative Assembly. He represented Chevella from 1983 to 1985.

Reddy was the grandson of the Deputy Chief Minister of undivided Andhra Pradesh, Konda Venkata Ranga Reddy.

Reddy started a local news agency News & Services Syndicate (NSS) in 1980 with a passion for journalism. He also worked as President of Jubilee Hills Journalists Cooperative Housing Society and Press Club of Hyderabad.

== Political career ==
Reddy represented Chevella from 1983 to 1985. He held Chairman of Andhra Pradesh Sports council, Spokesperson and Grievance Cell Chairman of Andhra Pradesh Congress Committee (APCC) and unsuccessfully contested Lok Sabha elections in 1999 and 2014 from Hyderabad Lok Sabha constituency.

== Death ==
Reddy undergoing treatment for age-related ailments at Apollo Hospital in Hyderabad died on 13 October 2025 at the age of 84.
