= Antharam, Chevella mandal =

Antharam Ananthavaram
- Village
- Country: India
- State: Telangana
- District: Ranga Reddy
- Metro: Rangareddy district

Government
  - Body: Mandal Office
- Elevation: 582 m (1,909 ft)

Population (2011)
  - Total: 1,546

Languages
  - Official: Telugu
- Time zone: UTC+5:30 (IST)
- PIN: 501503
- Vehicle registration: TS07
- Lok Sabha constituency: Chevella
- Vidhan Sabha constituency: Chevella
- Planning agency: Panchayat
- Civic agency: Mandal Office

Anantharam is a village and panchayat in Ranga Reddy district, Telangana, India. It falls under Chevella mandal. The famous temple Panchalingala located on the outskirts of the village hills/gutta. The village produced scholars and well known per well educated people.
