= Maheshwaram Assembly constituency =

Constituency of the Telangana legislative assembly in India

Coordinates: 17.13°N 78.43°E

Maheshwaram
- Constituency No. 50 for the Telangana Legislative Assembly
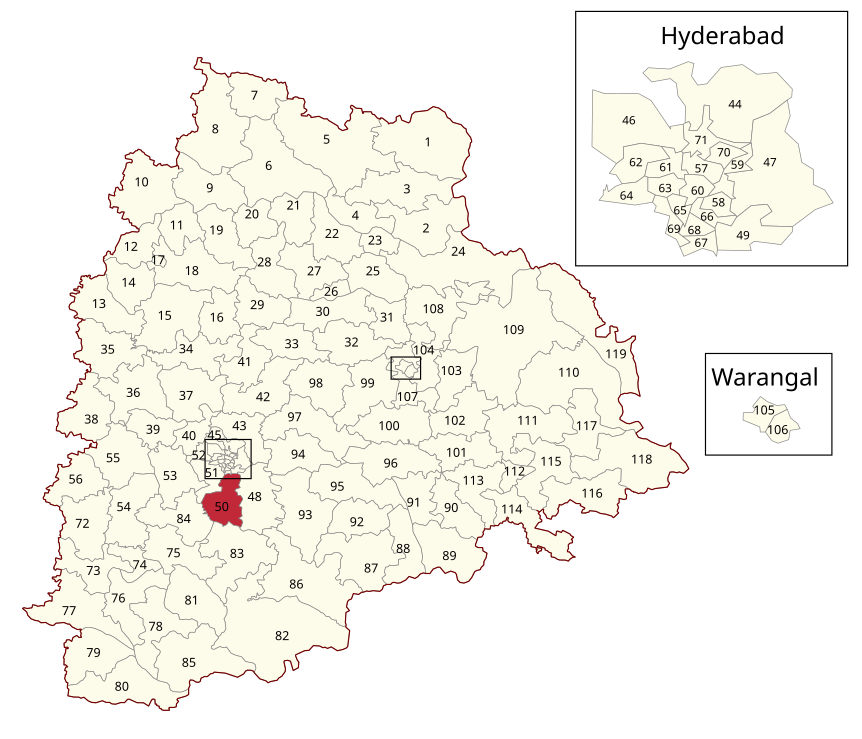
- Location of Maheshwaram Assembly constituency within Telangana

Constituency details
- Country: India
- Region: South India
- State: Telangana
- District: Ranga Reddy
- Lok Sabha constituency: Chevella
- Established: 2008
- Total electors: 3,79,201
- Reservation: None

Member of Legislative Assembly
- 3rd Telangana Legislative Assembly
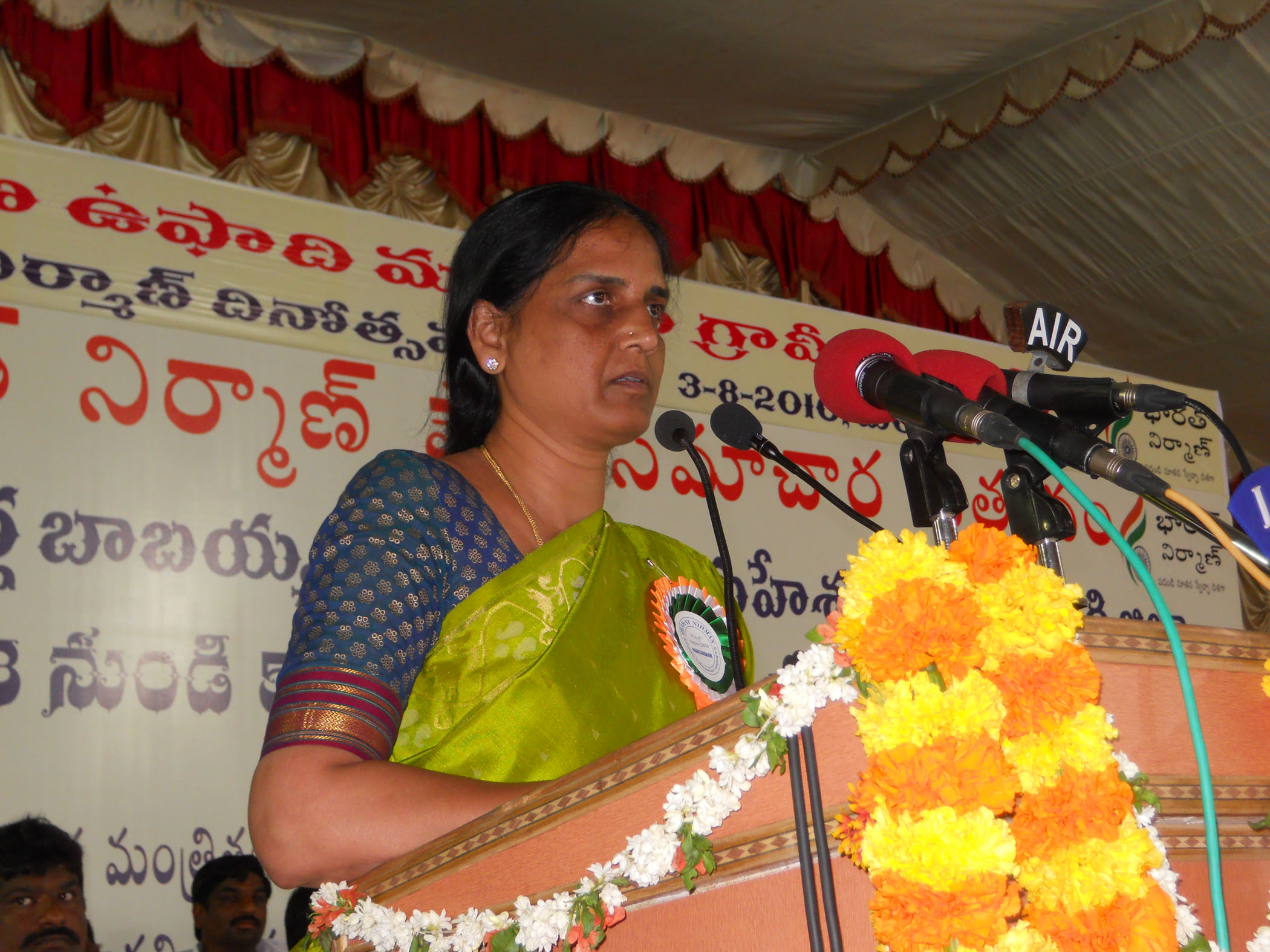
- Incumbent Sabitha Indra Reddy
- Party: BRS

Maheshwaram Assembly constituency is a constituency of the Telangana Legislative Assembly, India. It is one of the 14 constituencies in Ranga Reddy district. It is part of Chevella Lok Sabha constituency. It is also one of the 24 constituencies of Greater Hyderabad Municipal Corporation.

Sabitha Indra Reddy of Telangana Rashtra Samithi is currently representing the constituency.

== Overview ==
It is a newly formed constituency, created just before the 2009 general elections as per the Delimitation Act of 2002. The assembly constituency presently comprises the following mandals:

Mandal/Ward
Maheshwaram
Kandukur
Saroornagar (part)
Balapur

== Members of Legislative Assembly ==
Election	MLA	Political party
Andhra Pradesh
2009	Sabitha Indra Reddy	Indian National Congress
Telangana
2014	Teegala Krishna Reddy	Telugu Desam Party
2018	Sabitha Indra Reddy	Indian National Congress
2023	Sabitha Indra Reddy	Bharat Rashtra Samithi

== Election results ==
=== Telangana Legislative Assembly election, 2023 ===
2023 Telangana Legislative Assembly election: Maheshwaram
Party	Candidate	Votes	%	±%
BRS	Patlolla Sabitha Indra Reddy	125,578	40.99	▲5.80
BJP	Andela Sriramulu Yadav	99,391	32.45	▲16.00
INC	Kichannagiri Laxma Reddy (KLR)	70,657	23.07	▼17.76
NOTA	None of the Above	2,031	0.66	▼0.24
Majority		26,187	8.54	
Turnout		3,06,374	56.05	
BRS gain from INC		Swing		

=== Telangana Legislative Assembly election, 2018 ===
Telangana Assembly Elections, 2018: Maheshwaram (Assembly constituency)
Party	Candidate	Votes	%	±%
INC	Sabitha Indra Reddy	95,481	40.76	
TRS	Teegala Krishna Reddy	86,254	36.82	
BJP	Andela Sriramulu	39,445	16.84	
NOTA	None of the Above	2,171	0.93	
Majority		9,227	3.94	
Turnout		2,34,250	55.34	
INC gain from TDP		Swing		

=== Telangana Legislative Assembly election, 2014 ===
Telangana Assembly Elections, 2014: Maheshwaram (Assembly constituency)
Party	Candidate	Votes	%	±%
TDP	Teegala Krishna Reddy	93,305	42.86	
INC	Malreddy Ranga Reddy	62,521	28.72	
TRS	Kotha Manohar Reddy	42,517	19.53	
CPI	Syed Azeez Pasha	5,333	2.45	
CPI(M)	Dubbaka Ramchandraiah	3,068	1.41	
LSP	Devi Prasad Samudrala	2,864	1.32	
NOTA	None of the above	1,396	0.64	
Majority		30,784	14.14	
Turnout		2,17,679	53.92	
TDP gain from INC		Swing		

=== Andhra Pradesh Legislative Assembly election, 2009 ===
Andhra Pradesh Assembly Elections, 2009: Maheshwaram (Assembly constituency)
Party	Candidate	Votes	%	±%
INC	Sabitha Indra Reddy	65,077	37.21	
TDP	Teegala Krishna Reddy	57,244	32.73	
PRP	A Venkat Narayana Reddy	18,593	10.63	
BJP	Kallem Bal Reddy	15,407	8.81	
LSP	K Jangaiah Yadav	7,187	4.11	
Trilinga Praja Pragati Party	Ibram Shekhar	2,991	1.71	
BSP	Katikela Srihari	1,741	1.00	
TRS	K Prabhakar Reddy	1,471	0.84	
Majority		7,833	4.48	
Turnout		1,74,911	60.92	
INC win (new seat)				

== See also ==
- Maheshwaram
- List of constituencies of Telangana Legislative Assembly
