= Tangadpally =

- Village
- Country: India
- State: Telangana
- District: Ranga Reddy
- Metro: Rangareddy district

Government
  - Body: Mandal Office

Languages
  - Official: Telugu
- Time zone: UTC+5:30 (IST)
- Planning agency: Municipality
- Civic agency: Mandal Office

Tangadpally is a village and municipality in Ranga Reddy district, telangana, India. It falls under Chevella mandal.
