= Bastipur =

Bastipur can refer to:

- Bastipur, Janakpur, Nepal
- Bastipur, Sagarmatha, Nepal
- Bastipur, India, Bihar, India

== See also ==
- Bastepur, Ranga Reddy district, Andhra Pradesh, India
