= Damergidda =

- Village
- Location within Telangana Location within India
- Coordinates: 17°18′29″N 78°06′26″E
- Country: India
- State: Telangana
- District: Rangareddy district
- Mandal: Chevella

Languages
- Time zone: UTC+5:30 (IST)

Damergidda is a panchayat village in Ranga Reddy district, Telangana, India. It falls under Chevella mandal, and is the only village in the gram panchayat.
