= Noida Film City =

Film studio complex in Noida, India

Coordinates: 28.57°N 77.32°E

- Type: Government-held company
- Industry: Film production; Television broadcasting; Media services
- Founded: 1988; 38 years ago
- Founder: Sandeep Marwah
- Headquarters: Sector 16-A, Noida, Uttar Pradesh, India, Noida, India
- Number of locations: Sector 16-A, Noida, Uttar Pradesh, India; Sector 21-A, YEIDA City, Uttar Pradesh, India (under development)
- Area served: 100 acres (40 ha) (existing campus)
- Key people: Sandeep Marwah (Founder, AAFT)
- Products: Film studios; Television studios; Media production facilities
- Services: Filming; Broadcasting; Post-production; Studio rentals; Guided tours
- Owner: Government of Uttar Pradesh
- Number of employees: 150,000
- Parent: Film Bandhu, Government of Uttar Pradesh
- Subsidiaries: Asian Academy of Film and Television (AAFT); Marwah Studios

Noida Film City is a film city consisting a complex of studios and structures for filming located in Sector 16-A of Noida, Uttar Pradesh, India. It houses the Asian Academy of Film, Television and Marwah Films and Video Studios along with prominent news channels of India. It was founded in 1988 by Sandeep Marwah, an Indian film producer, founder and chairperson of the Asian Academy of Film and Television (AAFT). It has been the location for many Bollywood and Indian films, along with shooting television serials, news and other entertainment-cum-education programs, facilitated by satellite channels, multiplex offices, film and publication companies, radio and audio broadcasting and many other corporate offices.

The film city covers an area of about 100 acres (40 ha), of which 75 acres (30 ha) is outdoor and 25 acres (10 ha) is indoor, comprising 16 studios, 350 channels broadcasting everyday to more than 160 countries worldwide, more than 30 corporate offices, shopping malls, restaurants, souvenir shops and medical facilities. More than 17,000 media professionals work with a total workforce of over 150,000 people. Alongside the existing film city, a second film city at the under-development YEIDA City near to the under-construction Noida International Airport, has been proposed to be completed in the next five years. It will be ten times larger than the existing one with an area of over 1,000 acres (400 ha), making it one of the largest film cities in the world after Ramoji Film City at Hyderabad.

== Features ==
It covers a total area of about 100 acres (40 ha), of which the complex offers 75 acres (30 ha) of outdoor space and 25 acres (10 ha) indoor, 16 studios, more than 30 corporate offices, 350 broadcasting channels and employing about 150,000 people, of which over 17,000 are media professionals.

Owing to its proximity to Doordarshan (the Prasar Bharati transmission headquarters in New Delhi) and a large number of private broadcasting and transmitting stations that have moved to the National Capital Region (NCR), the film city has become a first choice for shooting television serials, news and other entertainment-cum-education programs.

It offers easy permitting that can be acquired within 48 hours, which is much faster than locations in Delhi, and also has low rates and hence it has become a favorite of many film producers. It also offers guided tours to visitors and the interested alike.

== Corporate offices ==
Corporate offices of major companies and television channels in the film city include:

- News World India
- Indian School of Communicative Arts (ISCA–School of Media Studies) INOX TOWERS
- Jubilant Life Sciences Ltd. / Jubilant Industries Ltd.
- NTPC Limited (Training & Development Centre)
- HPCL-Mittal Energy Limited
- Bharat Heavy Electricals Limited (BHEL) (Training & Development Centre)
- Freescale Semiconductor India Pvt. Ltd.
- Network 18
- Indian Express (Express Towers)
- NDTV
- TV Today Network of India Today Group
- Agency One Media Private Limited (INOX TOWERS)
- Moving Pictures Ltd.
- Marwah Studios
- Eagle Films
- T-Series
- Bag Films
- BKP Media Ltd. / Azad Channel
- Pragya Channel
- Mahuaa News and Entertainment
- Times Now & ET Now (Times Center) of The Times Group
- Dish TV India Ltd.
- GAIL (India) Ltd. Training Institute
- Zee Media Corporation Ltd.
- Mathews Network
- DK (publisher)
- Dainik Bhaskar Group

== Services ==
=== Broadcasting ===
Of the many companies and studios, Famous Studios has been producing feature films and TV programs on a regular basis for various satellite channels, which makes the film city a vibrant centre of flourishing activities. The film city also caters to various corporate offices and headquarters for satellite Channels, multiplex offices, news and publication companies, radio and audio broadcasting and film companies. Thus, the film city provides a suitable environment conducive to mass media and its studies.

=== Tours ===
The film city offers guided tours to tourists, visitors and the interested alike, and covers the entire film city by showcasing various features and more through shopping malls, souvenir shops, live performances and theatres. So far, the film city has attracted over 2 million visitors. Guided tours are informational, allowing visitors to observe studios and media facilities from designated areas without disrupting production.

== New Film City ==
In September 2020, the Chief Minister of Uttar Pradesh, Yogi Adityanath, announced to create a new and much bigger film city to serve as a hub of film-making in northern India in the under-development Sector 21 of YEIDA City, located in southern Noida. It will become the largest film city in Northern India and the second-largest film city in the world, covering an area of over 1,000 acres (400 ha), after Ramoji Film City in Hyderabad. The Yamuna Expressway Industrial Development Authority (YEIDA) has stated that alongside the film city, there will be a dedicated infotainment zone, a financial city, a commercial centre and many other facilities equipped with advanced and state-of-the-art public and technological facilities and features. The plan has been highly favoured by popular actors and singers of Bollywood, like Udit Narayan, Akshay Kumar and Boney Kapoor, who has appointed a Kanpur-based firm, Bayview Projects LLP, by creating a joint venture (JV) with Bhutani Group, to develop the project. The Detailed Project Report (DPR) of the project was prepared by the YEIDA after creating the blueprint, and submitted to the Government of Uttar Pradesh in June 2021. It was approved by the Government of Uttar Pradesh in the August 2021, and construction was supposed to begin from the same year, and finish by 2022. However, due to the COVID-19 pandemic, it got delayed, and a new revised DPR had to be prepared to change the alignment and correspond with the timeframe when work was rescheduled to begin from January 2022, which was submitted in October 2022, and finish by 2023. As of May 2024, construction is yet to begin by the latter half of 2024.

=== Description ===
According to the Detailed Project Report (DPR) prepared by the YEIDA, the film city will be developed at a total cost of about ₹65,000 crore (US$6.7 billion) over a span of 3-4 years, consisting of four consecutive phases. The project has been divided into seven zones on 230 acres (93 ha) under Phase-I and the remaining Phases II, III and IV, which will be developed at a later stage. Under the first phase, a total of 230 acres will be developed at a cost of about ₹6,500 crore (US$670 million), including 230 acres (93 ha) (33%) of commercial and 155 acres (63 ha) (67%) of industrial area. There will be all facilities and services under one roof to seamlessly and smoothly facilitate the work of an entire film crew in creating a film, with the help of luxury villas for accommodation, gym for workouts, commercial spaces for shopping and hangout venues and guest houses, so that the crew can come back on the main platform only after the completion of a film shooting. Other facilities and amenities will include a golf course, entertainment zones, commercial and shopping zones, including a big five-star hotel, and all other facilities required to shoot facilitate all activities under a single roof. In the second phase of the project, construction of a cinema-themed amusement park and virtual reality adventure parks will take place. The third phase will focus on global film making, world-class film making education, international standard studios of film making, an international film academy and diverse outdoor sets. In the fourth and last phase, the focus will be on revolutionizing with interactive and the advanced film making. The film city will also be sustainable and eco-friendly with sufficient green cover and green spaces in the form of integrated theme-based parks, walkways, adequate parking spaces and a proposed light rail system and buses for transportation within the campus. The seven zones of the project will have the following contents:

==== Zone 1 ====
The first zone will consist of the administrative and creative hub to be developed and housed in a signature tower to be built near the main entrance on 10 acres (4.0 ha) of area. It will also have a theatre, an eco-cinema centre, which will be accessible to the public, a film equipment mall and a film market.

==== Zone 2 ====
The second zone will have production houses and studios on 60 acres (24 ha) of area, alongside workshops, a film academy and a research library accessible to students and professionals.

==== Zone 3 ====
The third zone will be developed on 20 acres (8.1 ha) of area to accommodate staff residences, guest houses, hotels and health centres.

==== Zone 4 ====
The fourth zone will be developed on 15 acres (6.1 ha) of area for facilitating the transport services, costumes, props and fabrication factories.

==== Zone 5 ====
The fifth zone will be developed on 35 acres (14 ha) of area, comprising workshops, merchandise, information and booking centres.

==== Zone 6 ====
The sixth zone will be developed on 60 acres (24 ha) of area, and will house a film university for practical learning and training in skills and talents.

==== Zone 7 ====
The seventh and last zone will be developed on 60 acres (24 ha) of area, and will have a shopping mall, information technology (IT) hub, hotels and service apartments.

=== Transport ===
==== Road ====
The Yamuna Expressway passes through the under-development Sector 21 of the YEIDA City, so the film city will be directly connected with the rest of the National Capital Region (NCR) and beyond.

==== Rail ====
The film city will be served by the proposed 14.6 km (9.1 mi)-long light rail line, which will operate and run along a single corridor with the proposed 72.3 km (44.9 mi)-long Ghaziabad–Jewar Regional Rapid Transit System. The light rail corridor is planned to have a total of 13 stations after full completion, consisting of three RRTS stations at YEIDA North-Sector 18, YEIDA Central-Sector 21 and Jewar Airport.

==== Air ====
The location of the upcoming film city is just to the west side of the under-construction Noida International Airport, making it to be conveniently positioned close to transport hubs.

== See also ==
- Film City
- Ramoji Film City
- Cinema of India
- Film and Television Institute of India
- State Institute of Film and Television
- Satyajit Ray Film and Television Institute
