= Chanvelly =

- Village
- Country: India
- State: Telangana
- District: Ranga Reddy
- Metro: Rangareddy district

Government
  - Body: Mandal Office

Languages
  - Official: Telugu
- Time zone: UTC+5:30 (IST)
- Vehicle registration: TS
- Planning agency: Panchayat
- Civic agency: Mandal Office
- Website: telangana.gov.in

Chanvelly is a village and panchayat in Ranga Reddy district, Telangana, India. It falls under the mandal of Chevella. Chanvelly depends exclusively on agriculture. The only temple in the village is Spatika (Transparent) Lingam, Hanuman temple, Nava Grahalu and Amma Vari temple
