= Mirjaguda =

- Village
- Interactive map of Mirjaguda
- Coordinates: 17.4445°N 78.5343°E
- Country: India
- State: Telangana
- District: Ranga Reddy
- Metro: Rangareddy district

Government
  - Body: Panchayat

Population
  - Total: ~4,000

Languages
  - Official: Telugu Hindi Urdu
- Time zone: UTC+5:30 (IST)
- PIN: 500075
- Lok Sabha constituency: Chevella
- Vidhan Sabha constituency: Chevella
- Planning agency: Panchayat

Mirjaguda is a village and panchayat in Ranga Reddy district, Telangana, India. It falls under the Shankarpally mandal. It is located 25 km from Hyderabad. The village's official languages are Hindi, Telugu, and Urdu. Mirzaguda come under Chevella Mandal Rangareddy District 35 km from ORR APPA

Mirjaguda has a population of 963 as recorded in the 2011 Census. It falls under the jurisdiction of Mirjaguda Gram Panchayat and the Chevella Block Panchayat in Chevella District. The village has 231 households and is identified by village code 574299. Mirjaguda is located in the 501503 postal area, contributing significantly to the rural administrative structure of Chevella Sub-District.
