= Teegala Krishna Reddy =

Indian politician (born 1949)

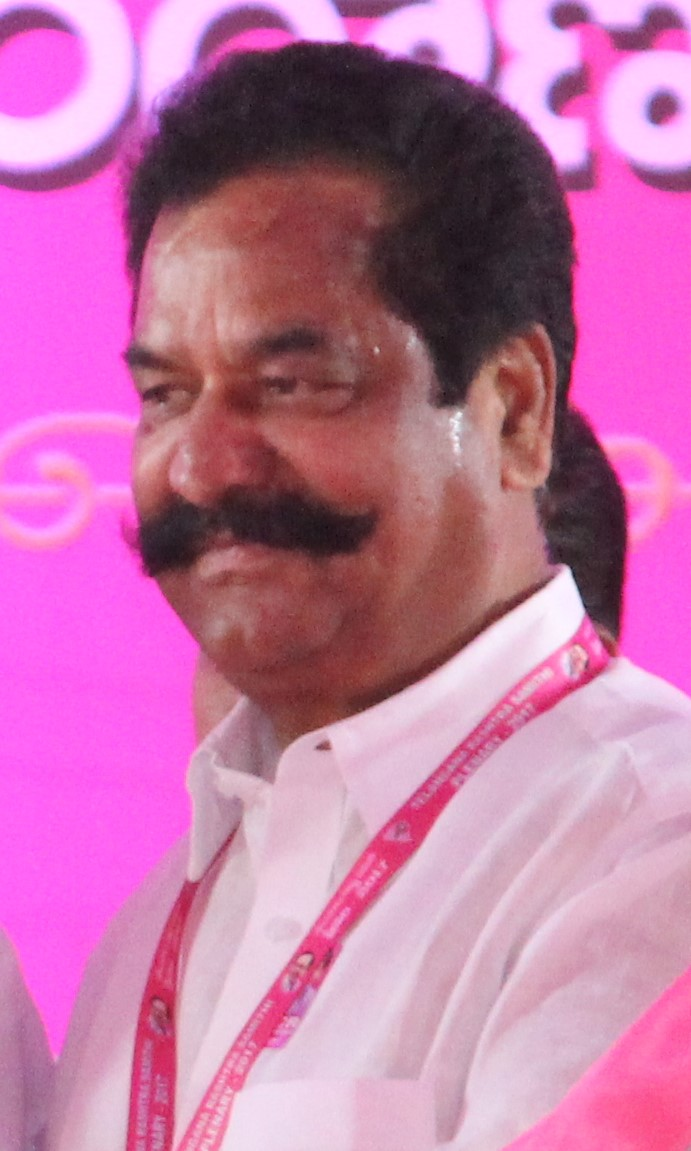

14th Mayor of Municipal Corporation of Hyderabad
- In office 2002–2007
- Preceded by: Mir Zulfiqar Ali
- Succeeded by: Office abolished (Banda Karthika Reddy as Mayor of Greater Hyderabad Municipal Corporation)

Member of Legislative Assembly, Telangana
- In office 2014–2018
- Preceded by: Sabitha Indra Reddy
- Succeeded by: Sabitha Indra Reddy
- Constituency: Maheshwaram

Personal details
- Born: 10 June 1949 (age 77) Meerpet, Ranga Reddy district, Telangana, India
- Party: Indian National Congress (since 2024)
- Other political affiliations: Bharat Rashtra Samithi (2014 to 2024); Telugu Desam Party (until 2014)
- Spouse: Arundhati
- Children: 2

Teegala Krishna Reddy (born 10 June 1949) is an Indian politician from Telangana. He served as a Member of the Legislative Assembly and was the last Mayor of Hyderabad Municipal Corporation. He is a member of the Indian National Congress.

== Electoral History ==
Year	Constituency	Party	Votes	%	Opponent	Party	Votes	%	Result	Margin	%
1998	Hyderabad (MP)	TDP	2,40,782	31.78	Sultan Salahuddin Owaisi	AIMIM	3,10,787	41.02	Lost	-70,005	-9.24
1999	Hyderabad (MP)	TDP	2,70,547	30.77	Sultan Salahuddin Owaisi	AIMIM	3,78,854	43.10	Lost	-1,08,307	-12.33
2002	Hyderabad (Mayor)	TDP	3,62,119	38.95	Mir Zulfiqar Ali	AIMIM	3,40,585	36.63	Won	+21,534	+2.32
2009	Maheshwaram	TDP	57,244	32.73	Patlolla Sabitha Indra Reddy	INC	65,077	37.21	Lost	-7,833	-4.48
2014	Maheshwaram	TDP	93,305	42.86	Malreddy Ranga Reddy	INC	62,521	28.72	Won	+30,784	+14.14
2018	Maheshwaram	TRS	86,254	36.82	Patlolla Sabitha Indra Reddy	INC	95,481	40.76	Lost	-9,227	-3.94

== Early life ==
Reddy was born in Ranga Reddy district, Meerpet. He completed his BA in 1971 from Osmania University. He is the Chairman of Teegala Krishna Reddy Engineering College.

== Career ==
Reddy joined the Telugu Desam Party during its foundation. He contested the Municipal Corporation of Hyderabad (MCH) elections in 1986 from Gandhi Nagar division on behalf of the Telugu Desam Party and lost. Reddy contested the MCH elections in 2002 and served as the mayor of Hyderabad until 2007.

He worked as the Chairman of Hyderabad Urban Development Authority. In the 2009 Andhra Pradesh elections, he contested as a Telugu Desam Party candidate from the Maheswaram constituency and was defeated by Indian National Congress candidate Sabitha Indra Reddy by a margin of 7,833 votes.

In the 2014 Telanagana elections, he contested as a Telugu Desam Party candidate again from Maheshwaram constituency and was elected MLA for the first time by beating his nearest rival Congress candidate Mal Reddy Rangareddy with a majority of 30,784 votes. He joined Bharat Rashtra Samithi on 29 October 2014. In the 2018 Telangana elections he contested as a Telangana Rashtra Samithi candidate from Maheshwaram constituency and was defeated by Indian National Congress candidate Sabitha Indra Reddy by a margin of 9,227 votes.
