= Future City Police Commissionerate =

Police force in Telangana, India

Future City Police Commissionrate

Agency overview
- Formed: 2025

Jurisdictional structure
- Operations jurisdiction: Rangareddy District, Telangana, India
- Legal jurisdiction: Rangareddy District

Operational structure
- Headquarters: Kongara kalan, Hyderabad, Rangareddy District, Telangana
- Agency executive: Dr Tarun Joshi, IPS, Commissioner of Police
- Parent agency: Telangana Police

Website
- https://www.tspolice.gov.in/future-city

Future City Police Commissionerate is the police commissionerate located in Kongara kalan, Rangareddy district, Telangana, India. It was created in 2025 by bifurcating Rangareddy District Police.

== History ==
The Director General of Police, Telangana, Hyderabad read above has furnished proposal for creation of Future City Police Commissionerate from Cyberabad Metropolitan Police and Rachakonda Police Commissionerates in order to maintain public order, enhance policing efficiency, ensure effective supervision, improve response time, and strengthen the overall law and order mechanism, with jurisdiction over the areas specified in the Annexure and requested the Government to issue necessary notification.

Government, after careful examination of the matter, hereby decides to create Future City Police Commissionerate from Cyberabad and Rachakonda Police Commissionerates with the jurisdiction over the areas specified in the Annexure.

On 29 December 2025, the Government of Telangana issued a notification, published in an Extraordinary issue of the Telangana Gazette, declaring the creation of the Future City Police Commissionerate. The notification was issued in exercise of powers under Section 7 of the Bharatiya Nagarik Suraksha Sanhita, 2023 (Central Act No. 46 of 2023), read with Section 8 of the Code of Criminal Procedure, 1973, sub-section (1) of Section 3 of the Cyberabad (Metropolitan Area) Police Act, 2004 (Act No. 2 of 2004), and Section 6 of the Telangana General Clauses Act, 1891 (Act No. 1 of 1891), along with other enabling provisions. The order superseded all previous orders relating to the existing territorial jurisdiction and formally designated the areas specified in the annexure as the Future City Police Commissionerate, with effect from the date of the notification.

== Current structure ==
Currently the Future City Police commissionerate has 3 DCP zones.

=== Chevella DCP Zone ===
- Chevella ACP Division
  - Chevella Police Station
  - Shankarpalli Police Station
  - Mokila Police Station
- Moinabad ACP Division
  - Moinabad Police Station
  - Shabad Police Station
  - Aziz Nagar Police Station

=== Maheshwaram DCP Zone ===
- Maheshwaram ACP Division
  - Maheshwaram Police Station
  - Kandukur Police Station
- Ibrahimpatnam ACP Division
  - Ibrahimpatnam Police Station
  - Manchal Police Station
  - Yacharam Rural Police Station
  - Hyderabad green pharma Police Station
- Amangal ACP Division
  - Amangal Police Station
  - Talakondapally Police Station
  - Kadthal Police Station
  - Madgula Police Station

=== Shadnagar DCP Zone ===
- Shadnagar ACP Division
  - Shadnagar Police Station
  - Kondurg Police Station
  - Chowdariguda Police Station
- Kothur ACP Division
  - Kothur Police Station
  - Nandigama Police Station
  - Keshampet Police Station
  - Pedda Shapur Police Station

== Traffic wing ==
=== Traffic DCP 1 ===
- Chevella Division Traffic
  - Chevella Traffic Police Station
  - Moinabad Traffic Police Station
- Shadnagar Division Traffic
  - Shadnagar Traffic Police Station
  - Kothur Traffic Police Station

=== Traffic DCP 2 ===
- Maheshwaram Division Traffic
  - Maheshwaram Traffic Police Station
  - Ibrahimpatnam Traffic Police Station
  - Amangal Traffic Police Station

=== Women's wing ===
- Chevella Women Police Station
- Maheshwaram Women Police Station
- Shadnagar Women Police Station

== Other wings ==
- Acp Division
  - SOT Chevella Zone
  - SOT Maheshwaram Zone
  - SOT Shadnagar Zone
- Acp Division
  - CCS Future City

== Police Commissioners ==
Future City Police Commissioners
Sl. No.	Name of Police Chief	Batch	Tenure	Domicile
1	Sudheer Babu, IPS	(RR)	31-12-2025 to 30-4-2026	Telangana
2	Dr.Tarun Joshi, IPS	2004 (RR)	1-5-2026 to	Telangana

== See also ==
- Bharat Future City
