= Sabitha Indra Reddy =

Indian politician (born 1963)

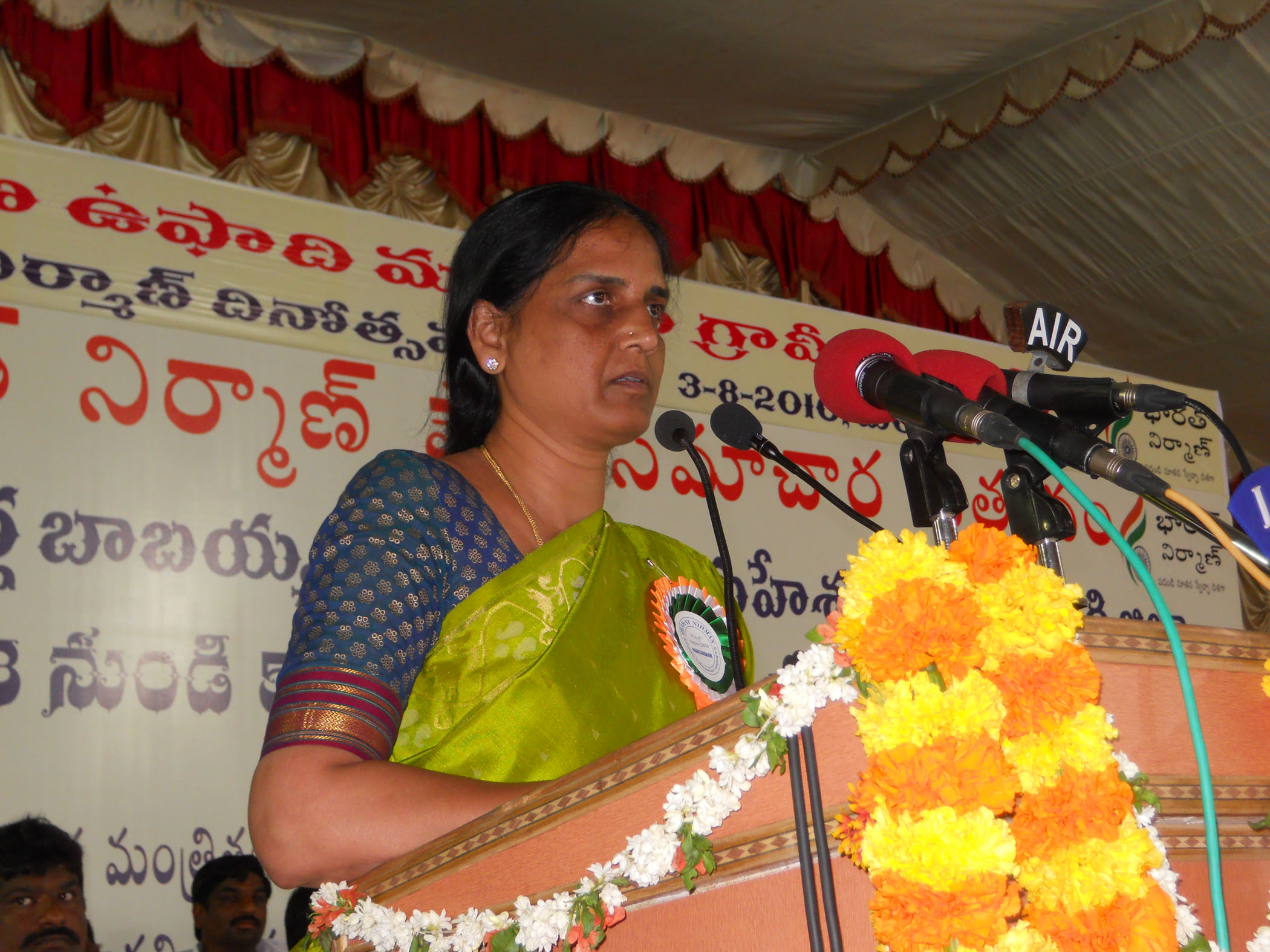

Minister of Education Government of Telangana
- In office 8 September 2019 – 6 December 2023
- Governor: Tamilisai Soundararajan
- Chief Minister: K. Chandrashekar Rao
- Preceded by: Kadiyam Srihari
- Succeeded by: Chief Minister of Telangana

Member of Legislative Assembly, Telangana
- Incumbent
- Assumed office 11 December 2018
- Preceded by: Teegala Krishna Reddy
- Constituency: Maheshwaram

Minister of Home, Jails, Fire Services, Sainik Welfare, Disaster Management & Printing and Stationary Government of Andhra Pradesh
- In office 25 May 2009 – 26 May 2013
- Governor: N. D. Tiwari; E. S. L. Narasimhan
- Chief Minister: Y. S. Rajasekhara Reddy; Konijeti Rosaiah; Kiran Kumar Reddy
- Preceded by: Kunduru Jana Reddy
- Succeeded by: Nallari Kiran Kumar Reddy

Minister of Handlooms, Textiles and Spinning Mills, Mines and Geology Government of Andhra Pradesh
- In office 14 May 2004 – 20 May 2009
- Governor: Surjit Singh Barnala; Sushilkumar Shinde; Rameshwar Thakur; N. D. Tiwari
- Chief Minister: Y. S. Rajasekhara Reddy
- Preceded by: Uma Madhava Reddy
- Succeeded by: Balineni Srinivasa Reddy

Member of Legislative Assembly Andhra Pradesh
- In office 2009–2014
- Preceded by: Teegala Krishna Reddy
- Succeeded by: Telangana Assembly Created
- Constituency: Maheshwaram
- In office 2000–2009
- Preceded by: P. Indra Reddy
- Succeeded by: Korani Sayanna Ratnam
- Constituency: Chevella

Personal details
- Born: 5 May 1963 (age 63) Medak, Andhra Pradesh(now Telangana, India)
- Party: Bharat Rashtra Samithi (2019 - Present)
- Other political affiliations: Indian National Congress (2000 - 2019)
- Spouse: P. Indra Reddy
- Children: 3
- Education: Intermediate

Patlolla Sabitha Indra Reddy (born 5 May 1963) is an Indian politician from Telangana and a five time Member of Legislative Assembly. She was the Minister for Education of Telangana state during 2019-23. She was elected twice from Chevella assembly constituency in 2000 and 2004 and thrice from Maheshwaram constituency in 2009, 2018 and 2023.

== Early life ==
Sabitha Indra Reddy was born on 5 May 1963 in Medak to Mahipal Reddy and Venkatamma. She was married to P. Indra Reddy (died 2000), and the couple has three sons.

== Career ==
Indra Reddy started her political career with the Indian National Congress and in 2009 became the first acting woman Home Minister of a state in India, serving until 2013.

She held the position of Mines and Geology Minister in the earlier government of Andhra Pradesh from 2004 to 2009. After winning the 2018 Telangana Legislative Assembly Election she joined Bharat Rashtra Samithi in 2019.

=== 2000 by-elections ===
She was pushed into politics after her husband had died in a road accident. She contested the 2000 by election on a Congress ticket from Chevella assembly constituency against KLR who is an industrialist and politician. She won the election with a majority of 29,909 votes.

=== 2004 general elections ===
In 2004, she beat the TDP candidate and won the Chevella seat. She won with a majority of 41,585 votes. Consequently, YSR inducted her into the Cabinet as Minister of Mines and Geology.

=== 2009 general elections ===
This election happened just after the constituency delimitation. As a result of this, her bastion Chevella constituency was changed to be an SC-reserved constituency. This resulted in her changing her constituency to the newly formed Maheshwaram (Assembly constituency). Though she moved few days prior to the election to the new constituency, she beat the local stalwart Teegala Krishna Reddy by a margin of 8000 votes. Thus, she became the first female Home Minister of Andhra Pradesh and a first female home minister to any state in India.

=== 2014 general elections ===
Due to Congress party's decision of one family one ticket rule that year, she had made way for her son Karthik Reddy, who made his electoral debut contesting Chevella Lok Sabha seat, but lost the election. She did not contest the 2014 elections.

=== 2018 general elections ===
Despite a strong TRS wave in the 2018 Telangana Legislative Assembly Election, she managed to win on a Congress ticket. Later, she joined the ruling party and became a cabinet minister in KCR cabinet. She defeated Teegala Krishna Reddy of TRS by a margin of 9.227 votes.

=== 2023 General elections ===
Reddy won her 5th election on a BRS ticket in the 2023 Telangana Legislative Assembly Election from Maheshwaram despite a strong anti-BRS wave. She defeated Andela Sriramulu Yadav of BJP by a margin of 26,187 votes.

== Electoral History ==
Year	Constituency	Party	Votes	%	Opponent	Opponent Party	Opponent Votes	%	Result	Margin	%
2000 (By)	Chevella	INC	—	—	K. Laxma Reddy (KLR)	TDP	—	—	Won	29,909	—
2004	Chevella	INC	96,995	60.55%	Sama Bhoopal Reddy	TDP	55,410	34.59%	Won	41,585	25.96%
2009	Maheshwaram	INC	65,077	37.21%	Teegala Krishna Reddy	TDP	57,244	32.73%	Won	7,833	4.48%
2018	Maheshwaram	INC	95,481	40.76%	Teegala Krishna Reddy	TRS	86,254	36.82%	Won	9,227	3.94%
2023	Maheshwaram	BRS	125,578	40.99%	Andela Sriramulu Yadav	BJP	99,391	32.45%	Won	26,187	8.54%

== Controversy ==
In 2011, Central Bureau of Investigation arrested V. D. Rajagopal and Y. Srilakshmi, as third and fourth accused respectively in the investigation into illegal mining by Obulapuram Mining Company. The permission for mining in Anantapur was for captive mining, i.e. the ore mined in that region is to be used in the local steel plant and not to be exported. Srilakshmi is accused of dropping the term "captive mining" in the final order approving a mining license to Obulapuram.

The CBI defended the Home minister saying there was no justification for the official to blame the Minister. As of April 2013, Sabitha Indra Reddy submitted her resignation letter from the Cabinet after the CBI named her as an accused in the Y. S. Jagan Mohan Reddy illegal investments case.
