= Simhadri Express =

Train in India

Simhadri express
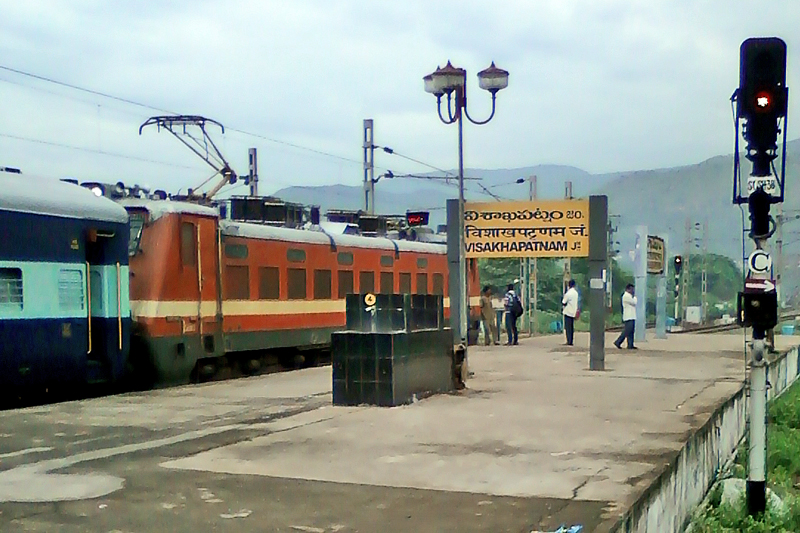
- Simhadri Express at Visakhapatnam.

Overview
- Service type: Express train
- Locale: Andhra Pradesh
- Current operator: South Coast Railway

Route
- Termini: Guntur (GNT); Visakhapatnam (VSKP)
- Stops: 22
- Distance travelled: 388 km (241 mi)
- Average journey time: 8 hours
- Service frequency: Daily
- Train number: 17239 / 17240

On-board services
- Classes: AC Chair Car, Second Class Seating, General Unreserved
- Seating arrangements: Yes
- Sleeping arrangements: No
- Catering facilities: E-catering only
- Observation facilities: Large windows
- Baggage facilities: No
- Other facilities: Below the seats

Technical
- Rolling stock: LHB coach
- Track gauge: 1,676 mm (5 ft 6 in)
- Operating speed: 48 km/h (30 mph) average including halts.
Route map
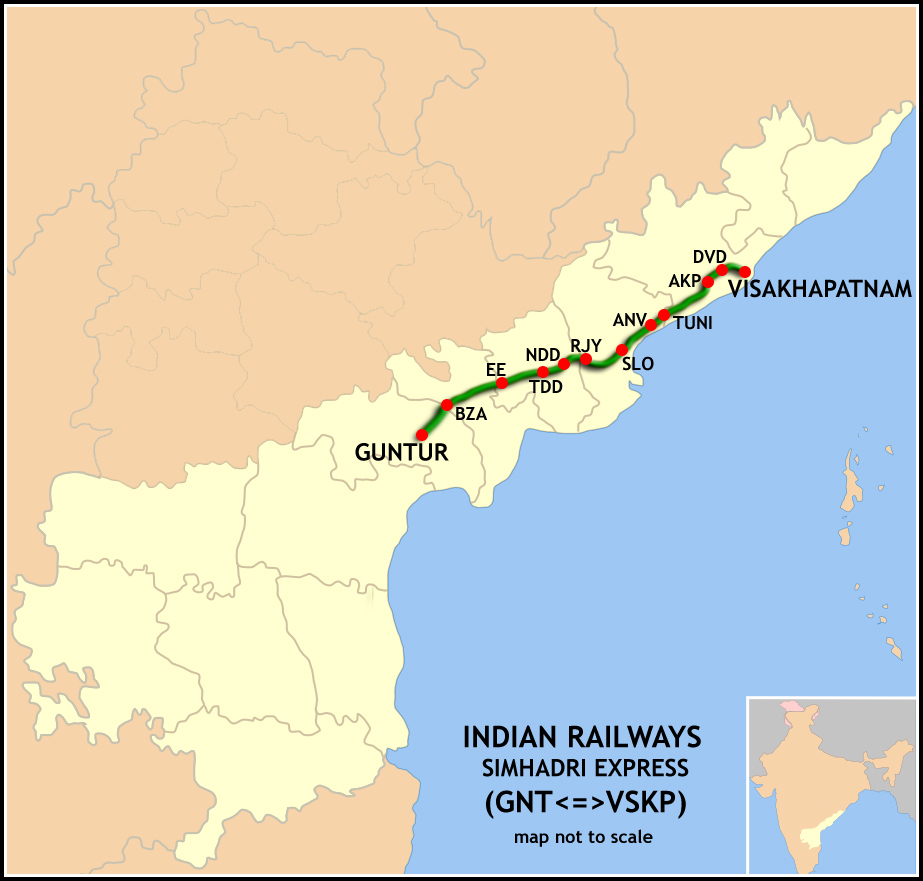

The 17239 / 17240 Simhadri Express is an express train in India which runs between Guntur and Visakhapatnam in Andhra Pradesh. This train is named after the god, Simhadri appanna in simhachalam of Andhra Pradesh . The Vijayawada division of the South Coast Railway zone of the Indian Railways administers this train.

== Numbering ==
Train Number 17240 runs from Visakhapatnam Jn to Guntur to while 17239 runs from Guntur to Visakhapatnam Jn

== Route ==
The train starts from Visakhapatnam Jn at 07:10 hours and reaches Guntur at 15:30 hours the same day. In the return direction it leaves Guntur at 08:00 hours and reaches Visakhapatnam Jn at 16:00 hours the same day. The train runs via Vijayawada, Eluru, Nidadavolu, Rajahmundry, Samalkot, Annavaram, Tuni, Anakapalli, Duvvada, Stations

== Rake sharing ==
This train has rake sharing with 12748/12747 Palnadu Superfast Express

== Locomotive ==
earlier was hauled by WDP-4D. The train is generally hauled by WAP-7 Lallaguda (LGD) Loco shed.

== Classes ==
The 21 coach composition contains– 1 AC Chair Car, 4 Chair car Sitting, 14 General,2 SLR
It runs with ICF coaches (Green indicating Electric locomotive, Yellow indicating colour of the general coaches, pink indicating reserved coaches and blue indicating AC coaches)
Coach Composition from Guntur to Visakhapatnam as 12739

Loco	1	2	3	4	5	6	7	8	9	10	11	12	13	14	15	16	17	18	19	20	21
	SLR	UR	UR	UR	UR	C1	D1	D2	D3	D4	UR	UR	UR	UR	UR	UR	UR	UR	UR	UR	SLR

Coach Composition from Visakhapatnam to Guntur as 12740

Loco	1	2	3	4	5	6	7	8	9	10	11	12	13	14	15	16	17	18	19	20	21
	SLR	UR	UR	UR	UR	UR	UR	UR	UR	UR	UR	D4	D3	D2	D1	C1	UR	UR	UR	UR	SLR

== See also ==
- Visakhapatnam Swarna Jayanti Express
- Samata Express
- Hyderabad–Visakhapatnam Godavari Express
- Hirakud Express
