= Kummera =

- Village
- Location in Telangana, India
- Coordinates: 17°20′N 78°11′E
- Country: India
- State: Telangana
- District: Ranga Reddy
- Metro: Rangareddy district

Government
  - Body: Mandal Office

Languages
  - Official: Telugu
- Time zone: UTC+5:30 (IST)
- Planning agency: Panchayat
- Civic agency: Mandal Office

Kummera is a village and panchayat in Ranga Reddy district, Telangana, India. It falls under Chevella mandal. According to census information the total population of Kummera is 935 living in 205 houses, among them male population is 471 and female population is 464.

Kummera vehicle registration code is TS-07, 08. Regional Transport (RTO) Office located in Rangareddy.

== Important Festivals ==
Bathukamma and Lashkar Bonalu are states official festivals besides these Dussehra, Diwali, Holi, Sri Ramanavami, Shivaratri, Ugadi, Ganesh Chaturthi, Bakrid, Ramzan are the major festivals celebrated in Kummera.

== Places of interest ==
Anantha Padmanabha Swamy Temple (Vikarabad), Karmanghat Hanuman Temple, Keesaragutta Temple, Sanghi Temple, Chilkur Balaji Temple, Ananthagiri Hills, Osman Sagar Lake, Mrugavani National Park, Vikarabad Adventure, Bikkanoor Sidda Rameswara temple, Alwaal Balaji Venkateswaraswamy temple, Sirigiripuram Mahakali temple are the major tourist attractions near to Kummera.

== Agriculture ==
Cotton, Maize, Chilli, Ground Nut, Paddy, Wheat, Sugarcane, Turmeric, Pulses are the major crops that are cultivated mostly in the area.

== Demographics ==
Kummera is a medium size village located in Chevella of Rangareddy district, Telangana with total 205 families residing. The Kummera village has population of 935 of which 471 are males while 464 are females as per population census 2011.

In Kummera village population of children with age 0-6 is 118 which makes up 12.62% of total population of village. Average Sex Ratio of Kummera village is 985 which is lower than Andhra Pradesh state average of 993. Child Sex Ratio for the Kummera as per census is 1070, higher than Andhra Pradesh average of 939.

Kummera village has lower literacy rate compared to Andhra Pradesh. In 2011, literacy rate of Kummera village was 64.99% compared to 67.02% of Andhra Pradesh. In Kummera Male literacy stands at 77.05% while female literacy rate was 52.61%.

As per constitution of India and Panchyati Raaj Act, Kummera village is administrated by Sarpanch (Head of Village) who is elected representative of village.

== Kummera Data ==
Particulars	Total	Male	Female
Total No. of Houses	205		
Population	935	471	464
Child (0-6)	118	57	61
Schedule Caste	240	119	121
Schedule Tribe	0	0	0
Literacy	64.99%	77.05%	52.61%
Total Workers	585	292	293
Main Worker	582	0	0
Marginal Worker	3	2	1
