= News World India =

Indian TV news channel

- Country: India
- Broadcast area: PAN India; Worldwide
- Headquarters: Film City, Noida, Uttar Pradesh

Programming
- Language: Hindi
- Picture format: 4:3 (576i, SDTV)

Ownership
- Owner: F7 Broadcast Pvt. Ltd.

History
- Launched: 1 August 2015
- Closed: 6 November 2019

Links
- Webcast: Watch Live
- Website: www.newsworldindia.in www.khabarnwi.com www.f7broadcast.com

News World India (Hindi: न्यूज़ वर्ल्ड इंडिया) was a free to air 24-hour national news channel. The channel was owned by F7 Broadcast Private Limited.

== About ==
News World India was a national Hindi news channel from F7 Broadcast Pvt. Ltd. At its inception, the channel was run from Laxmi Studio in Film City, Noida. Production shifted to Sector-4, Noida later.

Besides on-the-hour news bulletins, News World India offers shows helmed by television personalities.

== Collaborations ==
=== News World India & The CSR Journal ===
News World India has collaborated with The CSR Journal, a digital news publication headquartered in Mumbai, India. The CSR Journal works with policymakers, not-for-profit organizations, non-governmental organizations, leading corporate houses and various stakeholders. With this collaboration, News World India has extended its reach in Central India (Madhya Pradesh) by launching a news studio at Indore.

== Network Availability ==
The broadcast of News World India had been discontinued in November 2019. It's not available on any platform.

== Notable people ==
Ajita Jain joined as an Executive Editor and relaunched the channel successfully in September 2018 as a part of her second innings.

== See also ==
- List of Hindi language television channels
- List of Television Stations in India
