= P. Indra Reddy =

Indian politician

Patlolla Indra Reddy

Minister of Home, Jail & Fire Services, Sainik Welfare & Disaster Management Government of United Andhra Pradesh
- In office 1994–1995
- Governor: Krishan Kant
- Chief Minister: N. T. Rama Rao
- Succeeded by: Tulla Devender Goud

Minister of Education, Labour and Employment Government of United Andhra Pradesh
- In office 1985–1989
- Governor: Shankar Dayal Sharma
- Chief Minister: N. T. Rama Rao
- Preceded by: Pasupati Ananda Gajapathi Raju

Member of Legislative Assembly United Andhra Pradesh
- In office 1985–2000
- Preceded by: Konda Lakshma Reddy
- Succeeded by: Sabitha Indra Reddy
- Constituency: Chevella

Personal details
- Born: 4 October 1954 Kowkuntla Village, Chevella, Hyderabad State, India (now Ranga Reddy district, Telangana State, India)
- Died: 22 April 2000 (aged 45) Palmakuru Village, Shamshabad, Rangareddy district, United Andhra Pradesh, India (now Ranga Reddy district, Telangana State, India)
- Cause of death: Car Crash
- Party: Indian National Congress (1998-2000)
- Other political affiliations: Telugu Desam Party (1985-1996) NTR Telugu Desam Party (Lakshmi Parvathi) (1996-1998) Jai Telangana Party (1998)
- Spouse: Sabitha Indra Reddy
- Children: 3

Patlolla Indra Reddy (1954–2000) was a four-term member of Andhra Pradesh Legislative Assembly, former Home Minister of Andhra Pradesh state and founder of Jai Telangana Party.

Born on 4 October 1954 at Kowkuntla village in Chevella Mandal Ranga Reddy district to a poor farming family, Reddy studied MA and LLB in Osmania University. He was the elected Law College Student Union President. Indra Reddy was arrested during the emergency for 18 months. After his release he was elected as sarpanch of his village before he joined the TDP in 1985.

Indra was elected to the State Assembly four times. He was first elected on a Telugu Desam Party ticket in 1985 and served as a minister for education and then a minister for labour and employment in the N T Rama Rao Cabinet. He was re-elected on a TDP ticket in 1989 and 1994. He was minister for home, jails and fire services in the NTR cabinet of 1994–95.

During the August 1995 crisis in the TDP, when N T Rama Rao was toppled by his son-in-law N Chandrababu Naidu in a party and family coup, Indra Reddy remained with NTR. After NTR's death in January 1996, Reddy joined Lakshmi Parvathi's party but soon fell out with her and joined the Congress. He was re-elected to the assembly in the September 1999 poll on a Congress ticket.

== Electoral history ==
Year	Constituency	Party	Votes	%	Opponent	Result	Margin
1985	Chevella	TDP	49,944	64.91%	K. Vikram Kumar Reddy (INC)	Won	24,960
1989	Chevella	TDP	55,274	51.52%	K. Vikram Kumar Reddy (INC)	Won	4,213
1994	Chevella	TDP	77,284	63.89%	Patlolla Kista Reddy (INC)	Won	38,443
1999	Chevella	INC	73,425	51.52%	K. Laxma Reddy (TDP)	Won	9,840

== Telangana Movement ==
He floated a political party called the "Jai Telangana Party" in the pursuit of a separate state of Telangana. Later this party was merged into the Congress party on the promise of its support for a Telangana state.

== Death and legacy ==
He died in a road accident. According to the police, the accident occurred at Palmakuru village near Shamshabad between 0030 and 0100 hrs when the car carrying Reddy rammed into a stationary lorry. Reddy, 46, was accompanied by the Rangareddy District Congress Committee president, two gunmen and the driver. Reddy was returning from his native place -- Chevella – after attending a marriage.

He was succeeded by his wife and three sons. His wife Mrs. Sabitha Indra Reddy was later elected as MLA and she was also a minister in Congress Government.
