= Chirag Pratap Lingam Goud =

Indian politician

Chirag Pratap Lingam Goud popularly known as Pedhanna (1921–1982) is a former MLA of Chevella Constituency, Andhra Pradesh.

== Personal life ==
Sri Chirag Pratap Lingam was born to Sri Chirag Sharabha Lingam & Smt Lingamma garu in the village PedhaMangalaram of Chevella Constituency. Andhra Pradesh's Ex. Deputy CM Sri Konda Venkat Reddy, Ex CM Sri Marri Chenna Reddy are from the same village. Sri Pratap Lingam's Education was done in Bombay which was considered as a foreign nation for Nizam's Kingdom. He was married to Sri Punyavathi. The couple had six children, His only son, Chirag Veerendra, who was an advocate high court, died in 2011 due to an accident.

== Founder of Goud Hostel ==
After various reforms and formations in the year 1951, Goud Hostel was established in Hyderabad by Sri Chirag Pratap Lingam Goud Garu and other Legendary leaders like Sardar Gouthu Lachanna etc. Pratap Lingam was elected as the first Gen. Secretary of Goud Hostel and continued his services to the hostel from 1951-1964. Later, He was elected as the President of Goud Hostel from 1965-1970. He contributed the best for the growth of Goud Hostel and its well being.

Besides his valuable contributions to Goud Hostel, His determination to help Kallu Geetha Karmikulu (toddy) made him Vice President of then Andhra Pradesh Kallu Geetha Parisramika Sangham and followed his services as an advisor for the same.

== Political career ==
Sri Pratap Lingam's political career was started from his childhood. He started his revolt against Nizam Nawabs along with Dr. Marri Chenna Reddy, Sri Vandematharam Rama chandra Rao and Sri Ramananda Theertham. He was a Journalist by profession.

in 1977 general elections, He competed for Chevella Legislative Asselmbly from Janatha Party and won over INC contestant Konda Venkata Ranga Reddy. Pratap Lingam Goud died due to heart stroke in 1982.
