= Jai Telangana Party =

- Leader: P. Indra Reddy
- President: P. Indra Reddy
- Founder: P. Indra Reddy
- Founded: 1 January 1998
- Dissolved: 1 February 1998
- Split from: Janata Dal (United)
- Merged into: Indian National Congress

Jai Telangana Party, is a defunct political party in the Indian state of Andhra Pradesh founded by P. Indra Reddy. JTP existed around 1998 and was part of the Rashtriya Janata Dal-led Jan Morcha (People's Front) in the 1998 elections. JTP worked for a separate Telangana state to be carved out of Andhra Pradesh.

P. Indra Reddy, had been the Home Minister of AP in the Telugu Desam Party cabinet. When TDP split after Chandrababu Naidu's internal coup, Reddy sided with Lakshmi Parvathi and her parallel TDP, NTR Telugu Desam Party (Lakshmi Parvathi). He later left NTRTDP(LP) to form JTP. After the 1998 elections, he merged his JTP with Indian National Congress.

In the 1999 elections to the AP assembly, Reddy was elected on a Congress ticket. Reddy died in a car accident in 2000.
