= Peddamangalaram =

- Village
- Location in Telangana, India Peddamangalaram (India)
- Coordinates: 17°20′14.84″N 78°15′27.30″E
- Country: India
- State: Telangana
- District: Ranga Reddy
- Metro: Hyderabad

Languages
  - Official: Telugu
- Time zone: UTC+5:30 (IST)
- PIN: 501504
- Vehicle registration: TS
- Lok Sabha constituency: Chevella
- Vidhan Sabha constituency: Chevella
- Website: telangana.gov.in

Peddamanagalaram is a village in Ranga Reddy district, Telangana, India. It comes under Moinabad (mandal). It is 20 km (12 mi) from Hyderabad city. The village is the birthplace of former Deputy Chief Minister Konda Venkata Ranga Reddy (the district was named after him), former Chief Minister Marri Chenna Reddy, former MLA Sri Chirag Pratap Lingam Goud, former MLA Konda Laxma Reddy

== Education ==
There is a Zilla Parishad High School in the village as well as Azad College of Engineering and Technology.

== Transport ==
The state-run TSRTC connects the village to Hyderabad and other towns and villages.
