= Shankarpalli mandal =

Mandal in Rangareddy Dist, Telangana, India

Shankarpalli
- Mandal
- Location in Telangana, India
- Country: India
- State: Telangana
- District: Ranga Reddy
- Headquarters: Shankarpalli

Area
  - Total: 192.72 km^{2} (74.41 sq mi)

Population (2011)
  - Total: 65,428
  - Density: 339.50/km^{2} (879.30/sq mi)

Languages
  - Official: Telugu
- Time zone: UTC+5:30 (IST)

Shankarpalli mandal

Shankarpalli mandal is one of the 27 mandals in Ranga Reddy district of the Indian state of Telangana. It is under the administration of Chevella revenue division and has its headquarters at Shankarpalli.

== Government ==
=== Administration ===
The mandal is headed by a tahsildar. As of 2011 census, the mandal has thirteen villages with one town.

The settlements in the mandal are listed below:

1. Anthappaguda
2. Bhulkapur
3. Chandippa
4. Dhobipet
5. Donthanpalle
6. Fathepur
7. Gopularam
8. Hussainpur (Hamlet of Kothapally)
9. Janwada
10. Kondakal
11. Kothapally
12. Mahalingapur
13. Maharajpet
14. Masaniguda
15. Mokila
16. Parveda (Chanchalam)
17. Parveda Khalsa
18. Proddutur
19. Ramanthapur
20. Ravalpalle Kalan
21. Sankepalle (Khalsa)
22. Sankepalle (Paigah)
23. Shankarpalle*
24. Singapur
25. Tangutoor
26. Yelwarthy
27. Yervaguda

== See also ==
- List of mandals in Telangana
