= Chevella Assembly constituency =

Constituency of the Telangana legislative assembly in India

Coordinates: 17.31°N 78.14°E

Chevella
- Constituency No. 53 for the Telangana Legislative Assembly
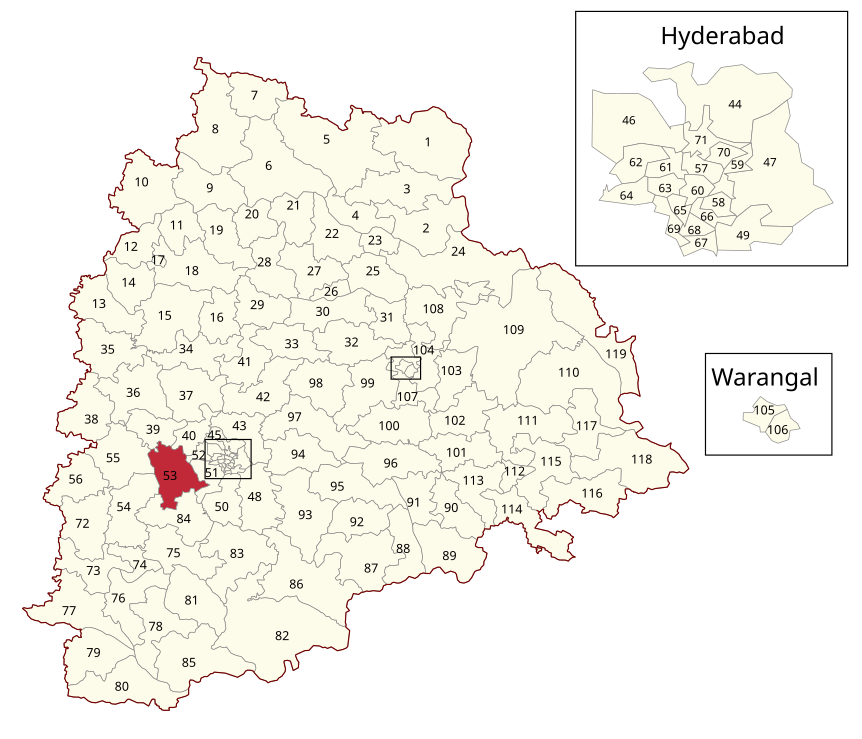
- Location of Chevella Assembly constituency within Telangana

Constituency details
- Country: India
- Region: South India
- State: Telangana
- District: Ranga Reddy
- Lok Sabha constituency: Chevella
- Established: 1951
- Total electors: 2,73,219. (Oct 2024)
- Reservation: SC

Member of Legislative Assembly
- 3rd Telangana Legislative Assembly
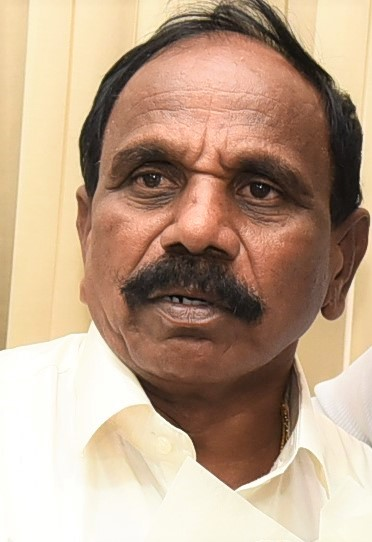
- Incumbent Kale Yadaiah
- Party: INC

Chevella Assembly constituency is a SC reserved constituency of Telangana Legislative Assembly, India. It is one of seven constituencies in Ranga Reddy district and is a part of Chevella Lok Sabha constituency. It is also one of the 27 constituencies of Greater Hyderabad Municipal Corporation. Kale Yadaiah is currently representing the constituency.

== Mandals ==
The Assembly Constituency presently comprises the following Mandals

Mandal	Districts
Chevella	Rangareddy
Shankarpalli	Rangareddy
Shabad	Rangareddy
Moinabad	Rangareddy
Nawabpet	Vikarabad

=== Delimitation History ===
The following circles or mandals were included in Chevella constituency after each delimitation.

Year	Circles/Mandals Included
1952	Shabad (C), Chevella (C), Kandawada(Moinabad) (C), Shankarpalli (C), Katedan(Rajendranagar) (C), Narsingi, Shamshabad.
1957	Shabad (C), Chevella (C), Kandawada(Moinabad)(C), Shankarpalli (C), Katedan(Rajendranagar)(C), Narsingi (C), Shamshabad (C).
1962	Chevella (C), Shankarpalli (C), Moinabad (C), Shamshabad (C), Narsingi (C), Rajendranagar (C).
1967	Chevella (C), Shankarpalli (C), Moinabad (C), Shamshabad (C), Narsingi (C), Rajendranagar (C).
1977	Chevella(M), Shankarpalli (M), Moinabad (M), Shamshabad (M),Rajendranagar (M) (including Narsingi Circle).
2009	Chevella (M), Shabad (M), Moinabad (M), Shankarpalli (M), Nawabpet (M).

- C - Circle
- M - Mandal

== Members of the Legislative Assembly ==
Election	Name	Party
1962	V. Ramarao	Indian National Congress
1967	S. Didge	Independent politician
1972	Kishan Rao	Indian National Congress
1978	Chirag Pratap Lingam	Janata Party
1983	Konda Lakshma Reddy	Indian National Congress
1985	Patlolla Indra Reddy	Telugu Desam Party
1989	Patlolla Indra Reddy	Telugu Desam Party
1994	Patlolla Indra Reddy	Telugu Desam Party
1999	Patlolla Indra Reddy	Indian National Congress
2000	Sabitha Indra Reddy	Indian National Congress
2004	Sabitha Indra Reddy	Indian National Congress
2009	Korani Sayanna Ratnam	Telugu Desam Party
2014	Kale Yadaiah	Indian National Congress
2018	Kale Yadaiah	Telangana Rashtra Samithi
2023	Kale Yadaiah	Bharat Rashtra Samithi

=== Shahabad Constituency ===
- 1962 The Constituency head-quarters was shifted from Shahabad to Chevella and renamed as Chevella assembly Constituency.
- 1957 (Seat-1): V.Ramarao
- 1957 (Seat-2): Konda Venkata Rangareddy

=== Hyderabad State ===
Shahabad Constituency

- 1951 Konda Venkata Rangareddy.

== Election results ==
=== 2023 ===
2023 Telangana Legislative Assembly election: Chevella
Party	Candidate	Votes	%	±%
BRS	Kale Yadaiah	76,218	38.73	
INC	Pamena Beem Bharat	75,950	38.59	
BJP	Korani Sayanna Ratnam	38,455	19.54	
BSP	Raja Mahendra Varma	1,720	0.87	
NOTA	None of the Above	1,423	0.72	
Majority		268	0.14	
Turnout		1,96,802		
BRS hold		Swing		

=== 2018 ===
2018 Telangana Legislative Assembly election: Chevella
Party	Candidate	Votes	%	±%
TRS	Kale Yadaiah	99,168	55.96%	
INC	Korani Sayanna Ratnam	65,616	37.03%	
BJP	Kanjarla Prakash	5,474	3.09%	
BSP	Karre Suneel Kumar	1,706	0.96%	
NOTA	None of the Above	1,469	0.83%	
Majority		33,552		
Turnout		1,77,197	79.02%	
TRS gain from INC		Swing		

=== 2014 ===
2014 Telangana Legislative Assembly election: Chevella
Party	Candidate	Votes	%	±%
INC	Kale Yadaiah	64,182	39.8%	
TRS	Korani Sayanna Ratnam	63,401	39.3%	
TDP	Mekala Venkatesh	15,117	9.4%	
Majority		781		
Turnout		1,62,571	79.1%	
INC gain from TDP		Swing		

== See also ==
- List of constituencies of Telangana Legislative Assembly
- Chevella
