= Gollapalli, Krishnagiri district =

Coordinates: 12.65173°N 78.03531°E

Gollapalli
- village
- Interactive map of Gollapalli
- Country: India
- State: Tamil Nadu
- District: Krishnagiri

Languages
  - Official: Tamil
- Time zone: UTC+5:30 (IST)
- Postal code: 635117

Gollapalli is a village in the Hosur taluk of Krishnagiri district, Tamil Nadu, India.
