= K. V. Ranga Reddy =

Indian statesman and activist (1890–1970)

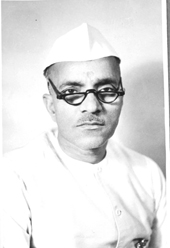
- K. V. Ranga Reddy

1st Deputy Chief Minister of Andhra Pradesh
- In office 1959–1962
- Preceded by: Position Established
- Succeeded by: J. V. Narsing Rao
- Constituency: Chevella

Personal details
- Born: Konda Venkata Ranga Reddy; 12 December 1890 Peddamanagalaram, Hyderabad State
- Died: 24 July 1970 (aged 79) Hyderabad
- Party: Congress (I)
- Spouse: Thungabadramma
- Children: Konda Madhava Reddy
- Relatives: Konda Lakshma Reddy & Konda Vishweshwar Reddy (grandsons)

Konda Venkata Ranga Reddy (12 December 1890 – 24 July 1970) was an Indian statesman and activist served as the first Deputy Chief Minister of Andhra Pradesh from 1959 to 1962. He is a freedom fighter who fought the Telangana Rebellion against the Jagirdars. The Ranga Reddy District in Telangana is named after him.

== Career ==
=== Political career ===
The Ranga Reddy District in Telangana is named after him, for fighting the Razakars, who were against the idea of Hyderabad State to be integrated into independent India.

He was a Minister of Revenue in 1959 in Neelam Sanjeeva Reddy's government. He became Deputy Chief Minister of Andhra Pradesh in 1961 in Damodaram Sanjivayya's government. He participated in the Telangana Movement and is known for his forthright speech at Siddiambar Bazar which ended with his words Ghulam Ki Zindagi Se, Mauth Acchi.

=== Educationist ===
K. V. Ranga Reddy also founded the educational institution, A. V. College. He was also a member of Indra Seva Sadan Society, established by Sangam Laxmibai in 1952 for achieving their objective of assisting women and girls. A girls college of the trust was named in his honour as, K. V. Ranga Reddy Degree College for Women.

He also started K. V. Ranga Reddy Women's hostel.

== Personal life ==
K. V. Ranga Reddy was married to Tungabadramma. K. V. Ranga Reddy and Tungabadramma had 11 Children, 7 Boys and 4 Girls. One of his sons, Konda Madhava Reddy was Chief Justice of Hyderabad High Court and Bombay High Court. One of his grandsons, Konda Vishweshwar Reddy, is an Indian politician and was a member of parliament from Chevella (Lok Sabha constituency), Telangana.

Marri Chenna Reddy was born to K V Ranga Reddy's sister Buchamma in a village, Pedda Managalaram near Hyderabad. His brother's (Konda Narayan Reddy) daughter was married to Marri Chenna Reddy, former Chief Minister of Andhra Pradesh.

== Bibliography ==
- My Autobiography by K. V. Ranga Reddy
