= Chirag Odhav =

American youth volunteer

Recipient of Jefferson Awards for Public Service

Personal details
- Born: 1992 (age 33–34) Memphis, Tennessee

Chirag Odhav is the youngest recipient of the Jefferson Awards for Public Service. Nominated in 2009, Odhav dedicated a large amount of time collecting necessary supplies for tornado victims of Jackson, TN. According to the Jackson Sun, Odhav has received numerous community awards, such as the Annual Youth Volunteer Award for the Jackson Area Chapter of the American Red Cross (2009, 2010) and the Governor's Volunteer Stars Award (2010). Chirag attended high school at the University School of Jackson, and graduated from the University of California, Berkeley in 2015. He also completed a Masters of Science in Real Estate Development at Columbia University in 2024.

During his time at Berkeley, Odhav was mentioned in Forbes for his team effort on an investment thesis on GasLog, which won 1st place at the 2013 Georgetown University stock competition. On November 8, 2014, Odhav made an appearance at Harvard University for the first ever Seeking Alpha Stock-pitching Competition, where he and his team presented their long thesis on Conn's, Inc.

== Congressional Award ==
In 2011, Chirag received all three medals (Bronze, Silver, and Gold) for the Congressional Awards. Chirag received the Gold medal on Capitol Hill by Congressman Steven Fincher.
