= Maheshwaram =

- village
- Location in Telangana, India Maheshwaram (India)
- Coordinates: 17.132875°N 78.43665°E
- Country: India
- State: Telangana
- District: Ranga Reddy
- Talukas: Narsampet
- Elevation: 221 m (725 ft)

Languages
  - Official 1: Telugu
  - Official 2: Urdu
- Time zone: UTC+5:30 (IST)
- PIN: 501359
- Vehicle registration: TS
- Website: telangana.gov.in

Maheswaram is a village and mandal in Ranga Reddy district in the state of Telangana, India.

== Geography ==
Maheshwaram is at 17° 55'0N 79° 54' 0E. It has average an elevation of 221 metres (725 ft).

Village agriculture mainly depends on rain water and ground water. The main crops cultivated are paddy, cotton, corn, chilli, turmeric, and ground nut.

== Elections ==
T. Krishna Reddy of Telugu Desam Party won in the state legislative assembly elections in 2014. In the Telangana legislative assembly elections which were held in December 2018, the victor was Patlolla Sabitha.

== Religion ==
There is a 400 year old Shiva Ganga temple, from which the village got its name.
