= Bharat Future City =

Planned city in Telangana, India

- City
- Country: India
- State: Telangana

Area
  - Land: 12,000 ha (30,000 acres)

Bharat Future City is a planned city in Telangana, India. The city is governed by Future City Development Authority (FCDA). The Bharat Future City is currently under planning stages with plans to unveil the masterplan by December 2026.

== History ==
- In 2025, the Government of Telangana has announced plans to acquire 30,000 acres for Future city with 15,000 acres for city and 15,000 acres reserved for forest.
- In August 2026, the Future City Development Authority engaged with consortium with DP Architects, CBRE South Asia Pvt Ltd and The Urbanizer Global LLP for preparing the masterplan. The masterplan is expected to be released publicly by December 2026.

== Governance ==
=== Administration ===
Future City Development Authority (FCDA) is the administrative authority in Bharat Future city.

=== Police ===
The Future City Police Commissionerate handles law enforcement in Bharat Future City.

== Transport ==
=== Air ===
Rajiv Gandhi International Airport is the closest airport located 25 KM away.

== See also ==
- Gandhinagar
- Yeida
