= Telangana Sadhana Samithi =

Telangana Sadhana Samithi, was a political party in the Indian state of Andhra Pradesh, working for statehood for the Telangana region.

== History ==
TSS was formed in 2001 when A. Narendra, an MP from the Medak constituency, broke away from Bharatiya Janata Party. Narendra became the founding president of TSS.

In February 2002, TSS won one seat (out of 100) in the Municipal Corporation of Hyderabad elections. It had contested all seats.

== Merger with TRS ==
On 11 August 2002 TSS merged with Telangana Rashtra Samithi. He became a central minister when TRS joined the UPA in the government.
