= Kesaram =

Kessaram
- Village
- Location in Telangana, India
- Coordinates: 17°45′N 77°54′E
- Country: India
- State: Telangana
- District: Ranga Reddy

Government
  - Body: Dharpally Mandal Office

Languages
  - Official: Telugu
- Time zone: UTC+5:30 (IST)
- PIN: 503164
- Planning agency: Panchayat
- Civic agency: Dharpally Mandal Office

Kesaram is a village and panchayat in Nizamabad district, Telangana, India. It falls under Dharpally mandal.
