= Shankarpalli railway station =

Indian railway station

Shankarpalli
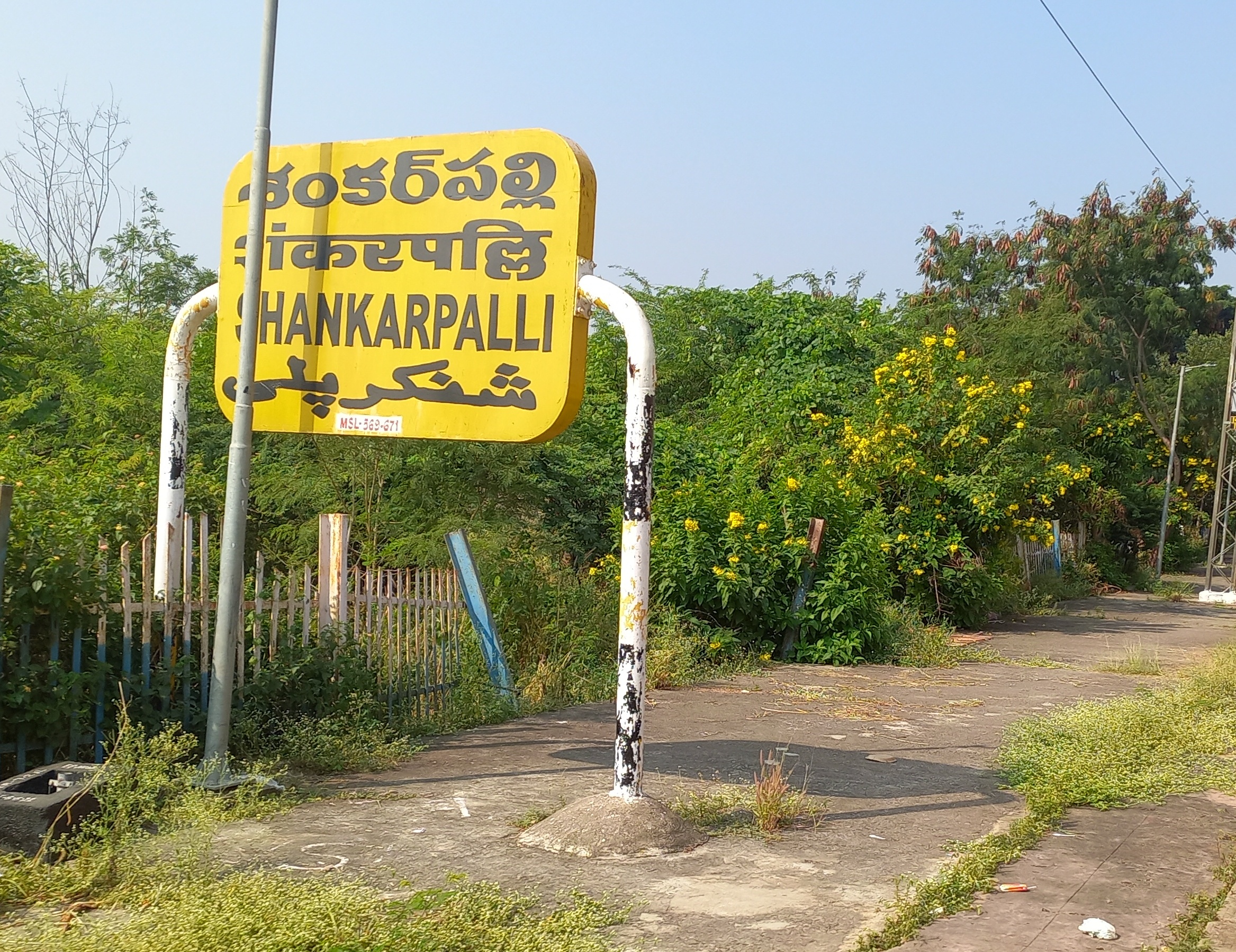
- Shankarpalli Railway station name board

General information
- Location: Shankarpalli Police Station Road, Shankarpalli. India
- Coordinates: 17.4506°N 78.1307°E
- Owner: Government of India
- Operator: Indian Railways
- Platforms: 2
- Tracks: 4

Construction
- Structure type: Standard
- Parking: Available

Other information
- Status: Functional
- Station code: SKP
- Zone(s): South Central Railway zone
- Division(s): Secunderabad

Services
Preceding station	Indian Railways	Following station
Nagalapalli towards ?	Shankarpalli Secunderabad Jn–Vikarabad Jn.	Ravulapalli Kalan towards ?
Location
- Location within Telangana Location within India

Shankarpalli railway station is located in Rangareddi district of Telangana State, India and serves Shankarpalli.

== Overview ==
Shankarpalli is a station located in between Secunderabad Junction to Vikarabad Junction Railway Line. It is well connected to Bidar, Tandur, Secunderabad, Vijayawada, Guntur, Kazipet, Tirupati, Shiridi, Nizamabad, CSMT Kolhapur, Manuguru and Kakinada Port Railway Stations through passenger, express and super fast express trains.
