= Konda Madhava Reddy =

Indian judiciary (1923–1997)

Chief Justice of Hyderabad High Court
- In office 1982–1984

Chief Justice of the High Court of Bombay
- In office 8 April 1984 – 21 October 1985
- Appointed by: Giani Zail Singh
- Preceded by: Madhukar Narhar Chandurkar
- Succeeded by: Madhukar Hiralal Kania

Personal details
- Born: 21 October 1923 Shahrajpet, Madras Presidency, British India
- Died: 25 September 1997 (aged 73) Hyderabad, India
- Spouse: Jayalatha Devi
- Children: Konda Vishweshwar Reddy
- Parent: K. V. Ranga Reddy (father)

Konda Madhava Reddy (1923–1997) was a former Chief Justice of Hyderabad High Court and Bombay High Court, and former member of the Council of Smaller States, New Delhi. Justice Reddy was an eminent personality in Indian judiciary at large and educational, cultural and social organizations in the state of Andhra Pradesh.

== Personal ==
Justice Konda Madhava Reddy was born on 21 October 1923, to Shri Konda Venkata Ranga Reddy and Tungabhadramma at Sahrajpet in Nalgonda district of the erstwhile state of Andhra Pradesh. He hailed from a distinguished family of freedom fighters. His father Konda Venkata Ranga Reddy was a congress leader, revenue minister and Deputy Chief Minister of State of Andhra Pradesh from 1957 thru 1962.

He was married to Jayalatha Devi. The couple had 3 daughters and 1 son, Konda Vishweshwar Reddy, who is a Member of Parliament from Chevella Lok Sabha constituency in Telangana.

He was an educationist, a scholar and a jurist.

Justice Konda Madhava Reddy died on 25 September 1997, after suffering from non-Hodgkin lymphoma.

== Education ==
- Government High School at Chaderghat, Hyderabad
- Bachelors in Political Science and Economics from Nizam College, Hyderabad
- MA Economics, Ferguson College, Pune University
- LLB from Bombay University

== Career ==
=== Judicial ===
Justice Konda Madhava Reddy had a prominent and successful career in Indian judiciary spanning over five decades. During his career, he held high ranks, to list a few:

- Pleader of AP High Court (1944)
- Advocate of AP High Court (1956)
- Public Prosecutor AP High Court (1967)
- Judge AP High Court (1968)
- Commissioner Cuddapah Police Firing (1973)
- Acting Chief Justice of AP High Court (1982)
- Chief Justice of AP High Court (1983)
- Chief Justice of Bombay High Court (1983-1985)
- Acting Governor of State of Maharashtra (1985)
- Chairman of Central Administrative Tribunal (CAT) (1985-1988)
- Senior Advocate of Supreme Court of India (1988-1997)

=== Educationist ===
Justice Konda Madava Reddy was founder and on the forefront of several educational, social and cultural organizations in the state of Andhra Pradesh. Following is a list of various organizations which he led. Some of these were founded by him.

- Syndicate and Dean of Law at Kakatiya University, Warangal
- Board Member at Kakatiya University, Warangal
- Board Member at Osmania University, Hyderabad
- Board Member at Nagarjuna University, Hyderabad
- Member of Indian Hockey Federation
- Chairman of Chaitanya Bharati Education Society
- Chairman of Chaitanya Bharati Institute of Technology
- Chairman of Kuchupudi Art Academy
- Chairman of Andhra Vidyalaya Education Society
- Chairman of Indira Seva Sadan Trust High School
