= Yeida =

Planned city in Uttar Pradesh, India

- City
- Yamuna Expressway Industrial Development Authority
- Country: India
- State: Uttar Pradesh

Yeida, short for Yamuna Expressway Industrial Development Authority, is a planned and the third city in the Gautam Budh Nagar district, following Noida and Greater Noida. It is situated on a 25,000-hectare expanse along the Yamuna Expressway in Uttar Pradesh.

The initial phase involves creating the Perspective Plan for the entire designated area and drafting the Master Plan 2031 for the National Capital Region, covering portions of Gautam Budh Nagar and Bulandshahar districts.

The planned city is expected to be developed around Yamuna Expressway and the Government of Uttar Pradesh has implemented the UP Industrial Development Act, 1976, with the aim of facilitating organized growth in industrial and related endeavors.

Another such planned city by the Uttar Pradesh government is in works which is expected to be created beside Ganga Expressway in Meerut.

== Transport ==
=== Air ===
Noida International Airport is the closest airport.

== See also ==
- Uttar Pradesh Expressways Industrial Development Authority (UPEIDA)
- Bharat Future City
