= Konda Vishweshwar Reddy =

Indian politician

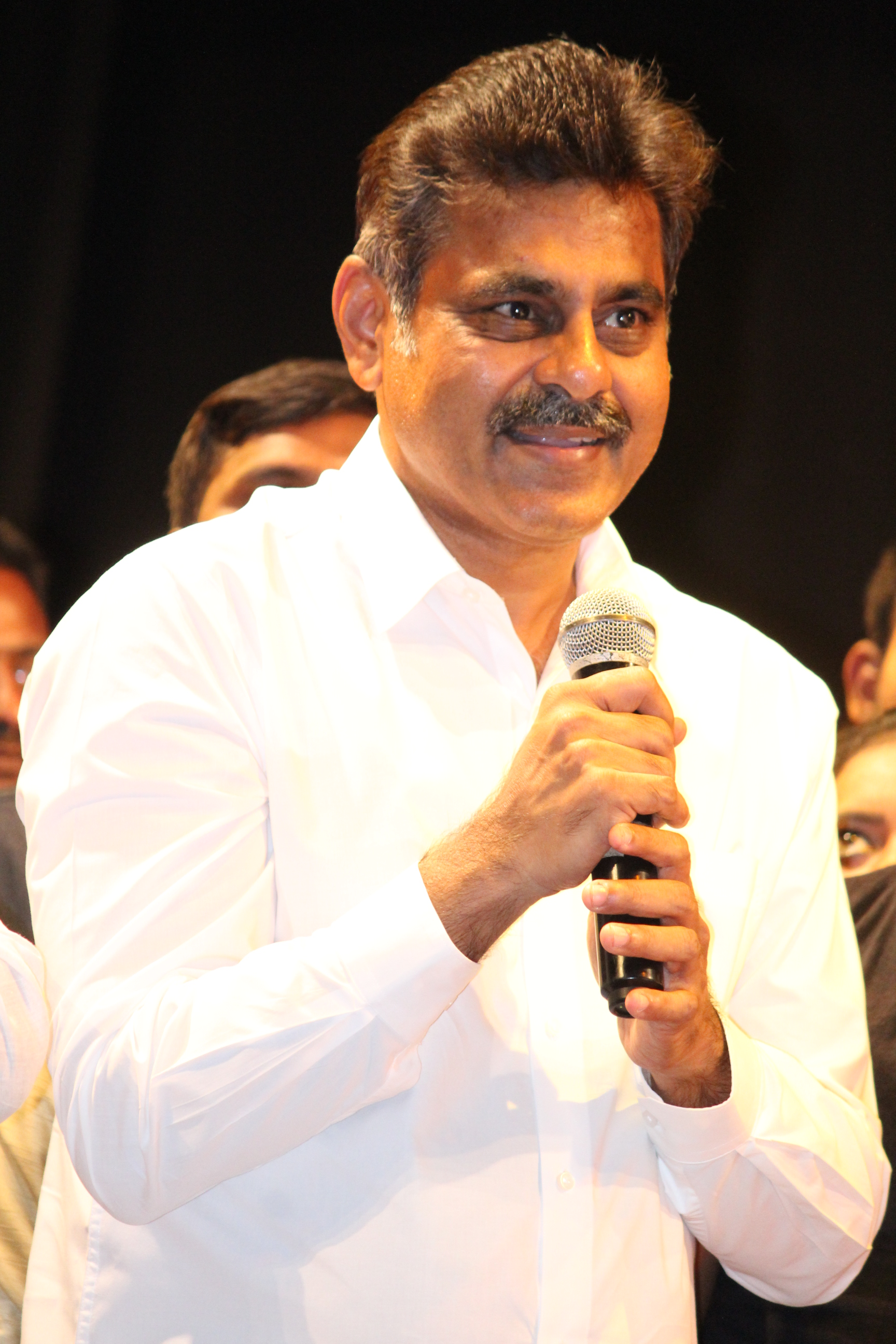
- Reddy speaking at a public meeting

Member of Parliament, Lok Sabha
- Incumbent
- Assumed office 2024
- Preceded by: G. Ranjith Reddy
- Constituency: Chevella, Telangana
- In office 2014–2019
- Preceded by: S. Jaipal Reddy
- Succeeded by: G. Ranjith Reddy
- Constituency: Chevella, Telangana

Personal details
- Born: 26 February 1960 (age 66) Hyderabad, Telangana, India
- Party: Bharatiya Janta Party (2021-present)
- Other political affiliations: Indian National Congress (2018–2021); Bharat Rashtra Samithi (2013–2018)
- Spouse: Sangita Reddy
- Children: 3, including Anindith
- Parent: Konda Madhava Reddy (father)
- Education: M.S
- Alma mater: New Jersey Institute of Technology
- Website: kvrformp.org

Konda Vishweshwar Reddy (born 26 February 1960) is an Indian engineer, entrepreneur, and politician. He is the current Member of Parliament in the 18th Lok Sabha from Bharatiya Janata Party Chevella constituency and served as a Member of Parliament in the 16th Lok Sabha from Bharat Rashtra Samithi representing Chevella, Telangana. He is the grandson of K. V. Ranga Reddy after whom the district Ranga Reddy was named.

Reddy is the only Parliamentarian from India to be granted a US patent while serving as a Member of Parliament. He is the richest politician from Telangana with declared assets of worth ₹528 crore in 2014 and ₹895 crore in 2019 and ₹ 4560 crore in 2024 according to his election affidavit. He is married to Sangita Reddy, daughter of Apollo Hospitals founder Prathap C. Reddy.

In 2018, Reddy joined the Indian National Congress and resigned in March 2021.

== Early life ==
Vishweshwar Reddy was born on 26 February 1960 in Hyderabad, Telangana, India to Jayalatha and Konda Madhava Reddy, Former Chief Justice of Andhra Pradesh and Maharashtra. His paternal grandfather was a Telangana freedom fighter and Deputy Chief Minister of Andhra Pradesh, Konda Venkata Ranga Reddy.

Reddy completed his B.E. (Electrical engineering) from the University of Madras. He has a master's degree from the New Jersey Institute of Technology, US.

== Career ==
As an engineer by profession, Reddy had worked as an adjunct faculty in the New Jersey Institute of Technology, N.J. and Essex County College, Newyork. He is a successful software entrepreneur; he founded Citadel Research & Solutions, a company involved in engineering research and development. He was involved in the creations of several IPRs. As a professional, he worked for General Electric as the CEO and managing director of GE MSIT and as the CEO and managing director Wipro HCIT Wipro.

=== Recognitions ===
- Granted US Patent on "Transfer Belt Mechanism Associated with Patient Transfer Gurney System (India & US)"

=== Political career ===
Reddy joined politics in 2013 on invitation from K. Chandrashekar Rao, President of Telangana Rashtra Samithi (TRS) Party. Further, he won the Member of Parliament seat from Chevella Lok Sabha constituency in 2014 General Elections by over a margin of 75,000 votes, in 2019 he stood as Congress candidate from Chevella but lost by 14,000 votes.

Reddy resigned from Bharat Rashtra Samithi in November 2018 and joined Indian National Congress in the presence of Sonia Gandhi and Rahul Gandhi. He later resigned Congress party too in March 2021 to join the Bharatiya Janata Party and contested 2024 loksabha elections on BJP Ticket from Chevella as BJP candidate and won by a margin of 1,72,897 votes. He was the appointed as Chief Whip in Lok Sabha on 29 July 2024.

=== Policy influence ===
- Convener of WASH Legislative Forum of Parliamentarians. WASH stands for Water, Sanitation and Hygiene. WASH-LF is supported by UNICEF working of various issues related to sanitation.
- Convener of Parliamentarians' Group for Children to UNICEF India

== Personal life ==
He is married to Sangita Reddy, managing director, Apollo Hospitals. He has three sons including Anindith.
