= Kale Yadaiah =

Indian politician

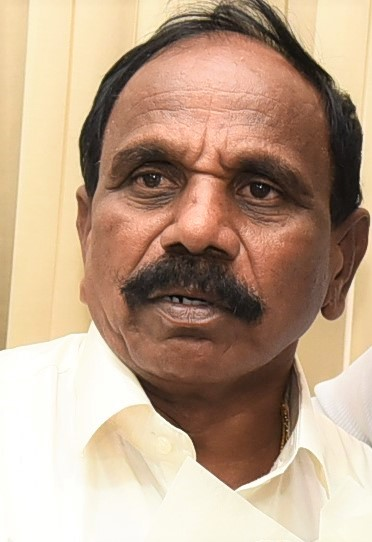

Member of Telangana Legislative Assembly
- In office 2014 - Incumbent
- Preceded by: K.S. Ratnam
- Constituency: Chevella

Personal details
- Born: 16 May 1962 (age 63) Chinchalpet, Nawabpet Mandal, Vikarabad District, Telangana, India
- Party: INC
- Other political affiliations: BRS
- Spouse: Jayamma
- Children: 4
- Parent(s): Mallaiah, Lakshmamma

Kale Yadaiah is an Indian politician and a legislator of Telangana Legislative Assembly. He represents Chevella in the Telangana Legislative Assembly.

== Political career ==
Kale Yadaiah started his political journey with the Congress Party and served as a chairman of PACS (Primary Agricultural Credit Society) and he worked as MPP in Nawabpet Mandal, ZPTC Nawabpet Mandal and served as board member of Tirumala Tirupati Devasthanams (TTD) in 2010. He contested unsuccessfully in 2009 Assembly elections from Chevella Assembly constituency, Ranga Reddy district on Congress Ticket.

After the bifurcation of the state in 2014, he contested from Chevella on Congress ticket and won by a narrow margin of 781 votes and was elected as an MLA. Later, he joined Telangana Rashtra Samithi and contested the 2018 Telangana Assembly elections on TRS ticket and won with a majority of 33,552 votes. He served as chairman of the Committee on Welfare of Scheduled Castes in Telangana Assembly. He defeated Pamena Beem Bharat of Congress Party in the 2023 Assembly elections by a narrow margin of 268 votes.

Yadaiah joined Indian National Congress in the presence of Chief Minister and PCC president A Revanth Reddy, AICC incharge of party affairs in Telangana Deepa Dasmunsi in Delhi on 28 June 2024.
