= Shankarpalli =

Shankarpally
- Municipality
- Location in Telangana, India Shankarpally (India)
- Coordinates: 17.4514°N 78.1317°E
- Country: India
- State: Telangana
- District: Ranga Reddy

Area
  - Total: 7.88 km^{2} (3.04 sq mi)
- Elevation: 560 m (1,840 ft)

Population
  - Total: 12,047
  - Density: 1,530/km^{2} (3,960/sq mi)

Languages
  - Official: Telugu
- Time zone: UTC+5:30 (IST)
- Postal code: 501203
- Vehicle registration: TG-07

Shankarpally is a town in Ranga Reddy district of the Indian state of Telangana. It falls under Shankarpally mandal of Chevella revenue division.

== Geography ==
Shankarpally is located at 17.4514°N 78.1317°E.

== Transportation ==
Shankarpally is well connected and provides the people of this town and the nearby villages with access to many transportation facilities. There is a railway station of South Central Railway of Indian Railways. Many passenger as well as super fast expresses, intercity expresses are operated in this line. This town has significantly developed road connectivity. Telangana State Road Transport Corporation a state owned corporation operates buses between Mehdipatnam-Shankarpally, Sangareddy-Shankarpally, Vikarabad-Shankarpally, Chevella-Shankarpally, Mominpet-Shankarpally, Patancheru-Shankarpally among the many other lines. The state highway also passes through this town.

== Demographics ==
As of 2011 census, Shankarpally had a population of 12,047. The total population constitute, 6,097 males and 5,950 females —a sex ratio of 976 females per 1000 males. 1,639 children are in the age group of 0–6 years, of which 850 are boys and 786 are girls. The average literacy rate stands at 83.01% with 10,001 literates, significantly higher than the state average of 67.41%.

== Government and politics ==
Shankarpally gram panchayat is the local self-government of the village. The panchayat is divided into wards and each ward is represented by an elected ward member. The ward members are headed by a Sarpanch. Shankarpally Constituted as Municipality on 2 August 2018 Merged with 4 other Gram Panchayats, Ramanthapur, Fathepur, Bulkapur, Singapur.

Shankarpally falls under Chevella (SC) (Assembly constituency) of Telangana Legislative Assembly. The present MLA representing the constituency is Kale Yadaiah of Indian National Congress.

== Education ==
Indus International School is located in the area. This village is approximately 5 km (3.1 mi) from IIT Hyderabad Campus. Global Indian International School, is also located in this area. IBS Hyderabad, a constituent of the ICFAI Foundation for Higher Education (IFHE) a Deemed University as per the UGC Act 1956, is also located in Shankarpally. IBS is in Donthanapally, Shankarapally Road and 10 km (6.2 mi) from main Shankarpally. Not only the global schools and universities but there are local schools like Sri Vivekananda High School and Sri Vivekananda Junior College for Telugu and English mediums, Jagruthi Degree College, Chaitanya Junior College, Ramakrishna High School, Revathi High School, Sri Krishnaveni Talent School, and Aksharam Public School and PM SHRI Kendriya vidyalaya ordnance factory, it's an central government school that is located in eddumailaram village that comes under Sangareddy district.
