= Chevella =

- Town
- Location in Telangana, India Chevella (India)
- Coordinates: 17.3067°N 78.1353°E
- Country: India
- State: Telangana
- District: Ranga Reddy
- Metro: Hyderabad, India

Government
  - Type: Chevella Municipal Council
  - Body: Chevella Municipality
  - MP: Konda Vishweshwar Reddy (Bharatiya Janata Party)
  - MLA: Kale Yadaiah (Indian National Congress)
  - Municipal Chairman: Devara Samatha Venkat Reddy (2026)

Area
  - Total: 87.67 km^{2} (33.85 sq mi)
- Elevation: 623 m (2,044 ft)

Population (2011)
  - Total: 22,713
  - Density: 259.1/km^{2} (671.0/sq mi)

Languages
  - Official: Telugu & Urdu
- Time zone: UTC+5:30 (IST)
- PIN: 501 503
- Vehicle registration: TG 07, old AP28
- STD Code: +91- 08417
- Planning agency: HMDA
- Lok Sabha constituency: Chevella
- Vidhan Sabha constituency: Chevella
- Municipal commissioner: B Yadhagiri
- Police commissioner: Yogesh Gowtham, IPS, DCP Chevella Zone, Future City Police; B Kishan, ACP Chevella Division, Future City Police

Chevella is a town, mandal and suburb of Hyderabad in Ranga Reddy district of the Indian state of Telangana. It is the headquarters of surrounding villages with many government establishments like Judicial court, Revenue Division Office, Acp office under Future City Police Commissionerate. It is also an educational hub with many schools, junior colleges, engineering colleges, business schools etc. There are many hospitals located along with a medical college, the Dr. Patnam Reddy Institute of Medical Sciences. It has become a part of Hyderabad Metropolitan Development Authority.

== Location ==
Chevella is located in the western part of the Ranga Reddy district. It is 30 km (19 mi) from Hyderabad, 28 km (17 mi) from Vikarabad, and 32 km (20 mi) from Shadnagar.

== Municipality ==
Chevella Municipality was newly constituted on 3 January 2025. It was formed by merging 12 erstwhile villages: Chevella, Pamena, Devuni Erravalli, Dameragidda, Ibrahipalle, Ramannaguda, Kesaram, Malkapur, Urella, Mallareddygudem, Kandawada and Palgutta. The area of the ULB is 87.56 sq.kms. The population as per the 2011 Census is 24,342, presently (2025) estimated at 28,000.

== Municipal commissioners ==
- . T.Krishna Mohan Reddy 27-01-2025 to 30-01-2025 incharge commissioner
- 1. M Poorna Chandar 30-01-2025 to 24-06-2025
- 2. M Venkatesham 24-06-2025 to 30-04-2026
- 3. B Yadhagiri 01-05-2026 to

== Population ==
Chevella is a town in Chevella mandal of Rangareddy district in Telangana. According to the Census 2011, there are 1,559 families residing in the town. The population is 7,031, of which 3,553 are males and 3,478 are females; thus the average sex ratio of females to males is 979. The population of children under age 7 is 894, which is 13% of the total population. There are 463 male children and 431 female children under age 7; thus the child sex ratio is 931, which is less than the average sex ratio (979). The literacy rate is 72.5%, and Chevella thus has a higher literacy rate than the 66.8% of Rangareddy district. The male literacy rate is 81.72% and the female literacy rate is 63.08%.

== Politics ==
Chevella Municipality is the local self-government of the town. The municipality is divided into wards and each ward is represented by an elected ward member. The ward members are headed by a Municipal chairman.

Chevella was in the political limelight when it was represented by the late P. Indra Reddy and, after his demise, his wife Sabitha Indra Reddy.

Chevella (SC) (Assembly constituency) of Telangana Legislative Assembly: the present MLA representing the constituency is Kale Yadaiah of Bharat Rashtra Samithi.

Chevella (Lok Sabha constituency) is represented by Konda Vishweshwar Reddy of BJP as its Member of Parliament (India).

== Chevella Courts ==
- Addl. District Court, Chevella
- Sr. Civil Courts, Chevella
- Jr. Civil Courts, Chevella

Chevella Courts jurisdiction limits

  - Chevella Police Station
  - Shabad Police Station
  - Moinabad Police Station
  - Shankarpalli Police Station
  - Mokila Police Station
  - Chevella Excise Police Station
  - Chevella Traffic Police Station

== Chevella DCP Zone ==
Future City Police Commissionerate Chevella deputy commissioner of police jurisdiction limits.

- Chevella Acp
  - Chevella Police station
  - Shabad Police station
  - Shankarpalli Police station
- Moinabad Acp
  - Moinabad Police station
  - Mokila Police station
  - Shamshabad Rural Police station

== Chevella ACP Office ==
Chevella assistant commissioner of police jurisdiction limits

- Chevella Police Station
- Shabad Police Station
- Shankarpalli Police Station

== Chevella Traffic Police Station ==
- Chevella Traffic Police Station limits
  - Chevella Mandal
  - Shabad Mandal
  - Moinabad Mandal
  - Shankarpalli Mandal
  - Shamshabad Rural Mandal

== Chevella Excise Police Station ==
- Chevella Excise Police Station limits
  - Chevella Mandal
  - Shabad Mandal
  - Moinabad Mandal
  - Shankarpalli Mandal

== Chevella Revenue Division ==
Chevella revenue division is an administrative division in the Rangareddy district of the Indian state of Telangana. It is one of the 5 revenue divisions in the district with 4 mandals under its administration. Chevella serves as the headquarters of the division.

The Revenue Division presently comprises the following Mandals

Mandal	Districts
Chevella	Rangareddy
Shankarpalli	Rangareddy
Shabad	Rangareddy
Moinabad	Rangareddy

== Transport ==
TSRTC runs buses from Hyderabad City. They are:

- Route No. : 593 Mehidipatnam to Chevella via Moinabad.
- Route No. : 455c Shamshabad to Chevella via Nagarguda.
- Route No. : 593/316 Gachibowli to Chevella via Moinabad, TGSPA Junction, Manchirevula, Narsingi, Nanakramguda.

The Hyderabad–Kodangal is the new National highway with a length of 133 km (83 mi), passes through Chevella.

=== Rail ===
The nearest railway stations are Shankarpalli railway station which is about 20 km (12 mi) away, Secunderabad (about 60 km (37 mi) away) Shadnagar Station, which is around 33 km (21 mi) away and Vikarabad Railway junction which is 27 km (17 mi) away.

=== Air ===
The nearest air transport facility is Hyderabad International Airport, which is 28 km from Chevella.

=== Roads ===
The NH-163, NH-44 link road passes through the town.

About 25 km (16 mi) away from Chevella there is an outer ring road which connects to Shamshabad airport - Rajiv Gandhi International Airport, Hyderabad, Gachibowli, and Medchal.

== Education ==
Chevella Mandal falls under the jurisdiction of Osmania University. The Mandal has many government and private junior, undergraduate and graduate colleges, engineering colleges, and a private medical college.

The primary and secondary school education is imparted by the government schools such as Mandal Parishad, Mandal Parishad upper primary and Zilla Parishad High Schools and private high schools.

== Important festivals ==
Bathukamma and Lashkar Bonalu are state official festivals besides Dussehra, Diwali, Holi, Sri Ramanavami, Shivaratri, Ugadi, Ganesh Chaturthi, Bakrid, Ramzan, which are the major festivals celebrated in Chevella Mandal.

== Crops ==
The place is suitable for harvesting carrots (10-15 truckloads of carrots are transported to Hyderabad every day). Since Chevella is close to the city, farmers grow vegetables and flowers. In the recent years, the town has been hub to a lot of houses where flowers are grown. In addition, farmers grow other crops including tomatoes and vegetables, as well as rice, sorghum (jowar), cotton, and corn.
