= Thummalapalle, Vikarabad district =

Thummalapalle Thummalapally
- Village
- Location in Telangana, India Thummalapalle (India)
- Coordinates: 17.582040°N 77.836134°E
- Country: India
- State: Telangana
- District: Vikarabad
- Mandal: Marpalle
- Elevation: 571 m (1,873 ft)

Population (2011)
  - Total: 1,426

Languages
  - Official: Telugu
- Time zone: UTC+5:30 (IST)
- PIN: 501202
- Telephone code: 08416
- Vehicle registration: TS-34
- Nearest city: Sangareddy
- Sex ratio: 1:.975 ♂/♀
- Literacy: 48.24 %
- Lok Sabha constituency: Chevella
- Vidhan Sabha constituency: Vikarabad
- Climate: Normal (Köppen)
- Website: telangana.gov.in

Thummalapalle is a village (Thummalapalle, Gram panchayat) in Marpalle mandal, Vikarabad district, Telangana state, India. Nearly 48.24% of population is literate

== History ==
Thummalapalle village got its name from the presence of the Babul Trees in abundance. Babul Trees Known for its medicinal benefits and it is extensively used as a browse, timber and firewood species. The bark and seeds are used as a source of tannins. The species is also used for medicinal purposes. This village was once a small site for a group of inhabitants. The Lord Parameshwara Temple, Seventh Day Adventist Church, Mosque (Maseed/Masjid), Oorudamma, Durgamma, Pochamma, Bhulaxmamma, Maktha Bayi Ellamma and Hanuman Temples are some of the religious places in the village.

== Demographics ==
The boundaries are Bilkal and Gundlamarpalle to the east, Dargulpalle to the west, Komshetpalle to the north and Narsapur to the south. The village have some water bodies like a lake to its North, a small pond to the west and a water stream in the East.

This village has 331 families residing and the population is approximately 1426 of which 722 are males while 704 are females as per Population Census 2011. There are 1297 voters of which 653 are male and 644 are females as of January 2023. It is a major gram panchayath and there are 8 panchayath wards. Apart from the village population, it has a population of approximately 407 from the hamlet village Dargulpalle.

== Geography ==
Thummalapalle is located at 17.582040°N 77.836134°E. It has an average elevation of 571 metres (1876 ft).

== Distances ==
Distance from various cities (approximately)

- Hyderabad (state capital) - 85 kilometres (53 mi)
- Vikarabad (district HQ) - 37 kilometres (23 mi)
- Sangareddy - 35 kilometres (22 mi)
- Zaheerabad - 40 kilometres (25 mi)

== Facilities ==
There is a government school in the village, Mandal Parishad Upper Primary School (since 1966), Anganwadi Center (Pre-School). The village has a PHC sub center, post office and a water tank.

== Transportation ==
Thummalapalle is connected to the rest of the state and other districts by road. The Telangana State Road Transport Corporation runs a bus in the village. Thummalapalle has a bus station. The yellow colored auto rickshaw is the most widely used transport service and has a minimum fare of ₹ 20 to Mandal and ₹ 80 to Vikarabad.

== Economy ==
Thummalapalle's economy is predominantly agricultural with several traditional village industries. Agriculture is the main occupation. The main agricultural products of the village are Cotton, Bengal Gram, jowar, red gram, green gram, black gram, Corn and some vegetables.

== People ==
Religion in Thummalapalle Village (2011)
Hinduism	80.17%
Islam	18.34%
Christianity	1.12%
Other or not stated	0.37%

There are people from different religions - Hindu, Christian and Muslims. The famous festivals are Dasara, Bathukamma, Deepavali, Sankranti, Christmas, Ramzan, 26 January and 15 August.
