= Buchanpalle =

- Village
- Location in Telangana, India Buchanpalle (India)
- Coordinates: 17.524211°N 77.740352°E
- Country: India
- State: Telangana
- District: Vikarabad
- Mandal: Marpalle
- Elevation: 554 m (1,818 ft)

Languages
  - Official: Telugu
- Time zone: UTC+5:30 (IST)
- PIN: 501202
- Telephone code: 08416
- Vehicle registration: TS-34
- Nearest city: Sangareddy
- Sex ratio: 1:1 ♂/♀
- Lok Sabha constituency: Chevella
- Vidhan Sabha constituency: Vikarabad
- Climate: Normal (Köppen)
- Website: telangana.gov.in

Buchanpalle is a village (Buchanpalle, Gram panchayat) in Marpalle mandal, Vikarabad district, Telangana state, India. It is located at 17.524211°N 77.740352°E. It has an average elevation of 617 metres (2027 ft).

== Local governance ==
According to the Telangana State Election Commission, Gram Panchayat elections are conducted periodically to elect the Sarpanch and ward members.

In the 2025 Gram Panchayat elections, B. Venkatram Reddy was elected as the Sarpanch of Buchanpalle, reportedly winning against B. Mudhukar Mudiraj with a margin of around 500 votes.
