= Ravalpalle =

- Village
- Location in Telangana, India Ravalpalle (India)
- Coordinates: 17.540173°N 77.864372°E
- Country: India
- State: Telangana
- District: Vikarabad
- Mandal: Marpalle
- Elevation: 573 m (1,880 ft)

Languages
  - Official: Telugu
- Time zone: UTC+5:30 (IST)
- PIN: 501202
- Telephone code: 08416
- Vehicle registration: TS-34
- Nearest city: Sangareddy
- Sex ratio: 1:1.009 ♂/♀
- Lok Sabha constituency: Chevella
- Vidhan Sabha constituency: Vikarabad
- Climate: Normal (Köppen)
- Website: telangana.gov.in

Ravalpalle is a village (Ravalpalle, Gram panchayat) in Marpalle mandal, Vikarabad district, Telangana state, India.

== Geography ==
Ravalpalle is located at 17.540173°N 77.864372°E. It has an average elevation of 573 metres (1883 ft).
