= Kotmarpalle =

- Village
- Location in Telangana, India Kotmarpalle (India)
- Coordinates: 17.505649°N 77.795254°E
- Country: India
- State: Telangana
- District: Vikarabad
- Mandal: Marpalle
- Elevation: 626 m (2,054 ft)

Languages
  - Official: Telugu
- Time zone: UTC+5:30 (IST)
- PIN: 501202
- Telephone code: 08411
- Vehicle registration: TS-34
- Nearest city: Sangareddy
- Sex ratio: 1:.973 ♂/♀
- Lok Sabha constituency: Chevella
- Vidhan Sabha constituency: Vikarabad
- Climate: Normal (Köppen)
- Website: telangana.gov.in

Kotmarpalle is a village (Kotmarpalle, Gram panchayat) in Marpalle mandal, Vikarabad district, Telangana state, India.

== Geography ==
Kotmarpalle is located at 17.505649°N 77.795254°E. It has an average elevation of 605 metres (1988 ft).
