= Panchalingal =

- Village
- Location in Telangana, India Panchalingal (India)
- Coordinates: 17.565836°N 77.834331°E
- Country: India
- State: Telangana
- District: Vikarabad
- Mandal: Marpalle
- Elevation: 590 m (1,940 ft)

Languages
  - Official: Telugu
- Time zone: UTC+5:30 (IST)
- PIN: 501202
- Telephone code: 08416
- Vehicle registration: TS-34
- Nearest city: Sangareddy
- Sex ratio: 1:.902 ♂/♀
- Lok Sabha constituency: Chevella
- Vidhan Sabha constituency: Vikarabad
- Climate: Normal (Köppen)
- Website: telangana.gov.in

Panchalingal is a village (Panchalingal, Gram panchayat) in Marpalle mandal, Vikarabad district, Telangana state, India.

== Geography ==
Panchalingal is located at 17.565836°N 77.834331°E. It has an average elevation of 590 metres (1938 ft).
