= Marpalle =

Marpalle Marpally
- Village

- Location in Telangana, India Marpalle (India)
- Coordinates: 17°32′20″N 77°46′15″E
- Country: India
- State: Telangana
- District: Vikarabad
- Total Villages: 28
- Talukas: Marpalle

Area
  - Total: 218 km^{2} (84 sq mi)

Population (2011)
  - Total: 51,090
  - Density: 234/km^{2} (607/sq mi)

Languages
  - Official: Telugu
- Time zone: UTC+5:30 (IST)
- PIN: 501202
- Vehicle registration: TS 34

Marpalle is a mandal and town in Vikarabad district of the Indian state of Telangana. It is located in Vikarabad revenue division.

== Geography ==
The mandal is spread over an area of 218 square kilometres (84 sq mi). It is bounded by Munipally and Sadasivpet mandals of Sangareddy district in the north, Mominpet and Kotepally mandals of Vikarabad district in the east, Bantwaram mandal of Vikarabad district in the south and Raichur taluka of Raichur district of Karnataka state in the west.

== Demographics ==
Religion in Marpalle mandal (2011)
Hinduism	80.17%
Islam	18.34%
Christianity	1.12%
Other or not stated	0.37%

At the time of the 2011 census of India, Marpalle mandal had a population of 51,090. Out of which 25,714 are males while 25,376 are females. In 2011 there were a total 10,961 families residing in Marpalle mandal. The average sex ratio of Marpalle mandal is 987 females per 1000 males and a literacy rate of 57.67% (The male literacy rate is 59.47% and the female literacy rate is 41.7%). 6,225 (12.18%) were under 6 years of age. 51,090 (100%) Whole population of Marpalle mandal lived in rural areas. Scheduled Castes and Scheduled Tribes made up 13,811 (27.03%) and 2329 (4.55%) of the population respectively.

In Marpalle mandal, out of the total population 26,764 were engaged in work activities. 83% of workers describe their work as main work (employment or earning more than six months) while 17% were involved in marginal activity providing livelihood for less than 6 months. Of 26,764 workers engaged in Main Work, 10,331 were cultivators (owner or co-owner) while 9,164 were agricultural labourers.

To facilitate the administration, Marpalle mandal is further divided into 28 villages.

== Villages ==
S.No.	Village Name	Gram Panchayath	Nearest Town
1	Allapur	Kotlapur	Sadasivpet (26 km)
2	Bilkal	Bilkal	Sadasivpet (14 km)
3	Buchanpalle	Buchanpally	Sadasivpet (29 km)
4	Damasthapur	Damasthapur	Sadasivpet (33 km)
5	Dargulpalle	Tumalapally	Sadasivpet (22 km)
6	Ghanpur	Ghanpur	Sadasivpet (24 km)
7	Gundlamarpalle	Pilligundla	Sadasivpet (21 km)
8	Jamshedapur	Ghanpur	Sadasivpet (25 km)
9	Kalkoda	Kalkoda	Sadasivpet (33 km)
10	Komshetpalle	Komshettypally	Sadasivpet (16 km)
11	Kothlapur	Kothlapur	Sadasivpet (22 km)
12	Kotmarpalle	Kotmarpalle	Vicarabad (28 km)
13	Kudgunta	Peddapur	Sadasivpet (31 km)
14	Mallikarjungiri	Bilkal	Sadasivpet (13 km)
15	Marpalle Kalan	Marpalle Kalan	Sadasivpet (25 km)
16	Mogiligundla	Mogiligundla	Sadasivpet (16 km)
17	Narsapur	Narsapur	Sadasivpet (19 km)
18	Panchalingal	Panchalingal	Sadasivpet (27 km)
19	Patloor	Patloor	Sadasivpet (22 km)
20	Peddapur	Peddapur	Sadasivpet (35 km)
21	Pilligundla	Pilligundla	Sadasivpet (27 km)
22	Ramapur	Ghanpur	Sadasivpet (25 km)
23	Ravalpalle	Ravalpalle	Vicarabad (30 km)
24	Shapur	Kalkoda	Sadasivpet (33 km)
25	Sirpura	Sirpura	Sadasivpet (20 km)
26	Thimmapur	Ravalpalle	Vicarabad (30 km)
27	Thummalapalle	Tumalapally	Sadasivpet (17 km)
28	Veerlapalle	Veerlapalle	Sadasivpet (24 km)
