= Ghanpur, Vikarabad district =

Ghanpur
- Village
- Location in Telangana, India Ghanpur (India)
- Coordinates: 17.608576°N 77.783596°E
- Country: India
- State: Telangana
- District: Vikarabad
- Mandal: Marpalle
- Elevation: 598 m (1,962 ft)

Languages
  - Official: Telugu
- Time zone: UTC+5:30 (IST)
- PIN: 501202
- Telephone code: 08416
- Vehicle registration: TS-34
- Nearest city: Sangareddy
- Sex ratio: 1:0.958 ♂/♀
- Lok Sabha constituency: Chevella
- Vidhan Sabha constituency: Vikarabad
- Climate: Normal (Köppen)
- Website: telangana.gov.in

Ghanpur is a village (Ghanpur, Gram panchayat) in Marpalle mandal, Vikarabad district, Telangana state, India.

== Geography ==
Ghanpur is located at 17.608576°N 77.783596°E. It has an average elevation of 598 metres (1965 ft).
