= Kambalpally =

Kambalpally is a small village located in Sadasivapet Mandal, Medak district, in the Indian state of Telangana. It is part of the Sangareddy Assembly Constituency and the Medak Loksabha Constituency.
