= Kotlapur =

- Village
- Location in Telangana, India Kotlapur (India)
- Coordinates: 17.538316°N 77.801738°E
- Country: India
- State: Telangana
- District: Vikarabad
- Mandal: Marpalle
- Elevation: 605 m (1,985 ft)

Languages
  - Official: Telugu
- Time zone: UTC+5:30 (IST)
- PIN: 501202
- Telephone code: 08411
- Vehicle registration: TS-34
- Nearest city: Sangareddy
- Sex ratio: 1:.823 ♂/♀
- Lok Sabha constituency: Chevella
- Vidhan Sabha constituency: Vikarabad
- Climate: Normal (Köppen)
- Website: telangana.gov.in

Kotlapur is a village (Kotlapur, Gram panchayat) in Marpalle mandal, Vikarabad district, Telangana state, India.

== Geography ==
Kotlapur is located at 17.538316°N 77.801738°E. It has an average elevation of 605 metres (1988 ft).
