= Sangareddy Assembly constituency =

Constituency of the Telangana legislative assembly in India

Coordinates: 17.61°N 78.08°E

Sangareddy
- Constituency No. 39 for the Telangana Legislative Assembly
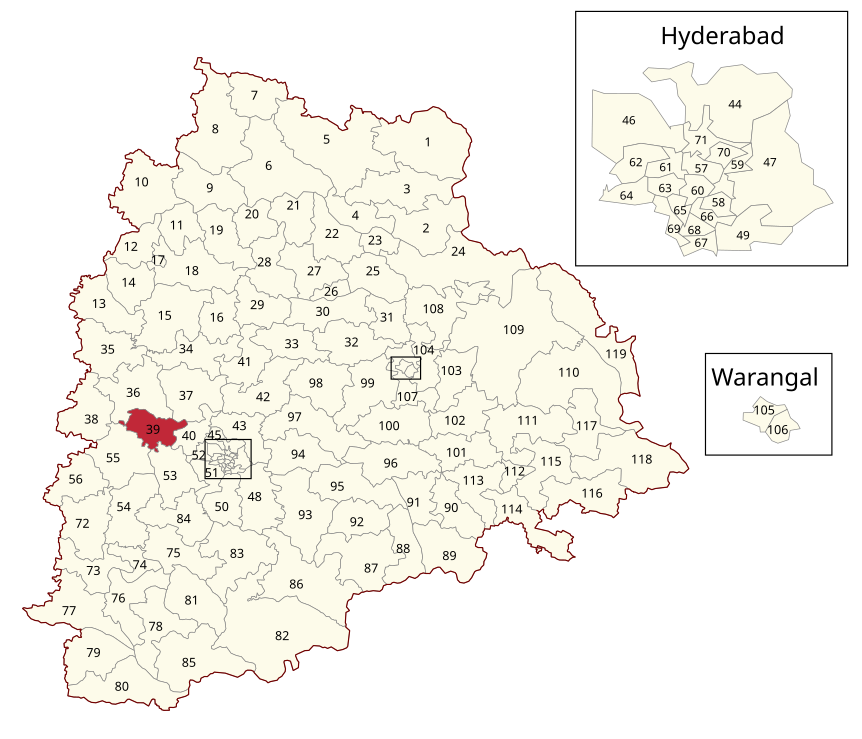
- Location of Sangareddy Assembly constituency within Telangana

Constituency details
- Country: India
- Region: South India
- State: Telangana
- District: Sangareddy
- Lok Sabha constituency: Medak
- Established: 1957
- Total electors: 203,379
- Reservation: None

Member of Legislative Assembly
- 3rd Telangana Legislative Assembly
- Incumbent Chinta Prabhakar
- Party: Bharat Rashtra Samithi
- Elected year: 2023

Sangareddy Assembly constituency is a constituency of the Telangana Legislative Assembly, India. It is one of the five constituencies in Sangareddy district. It is part of Medak Lok Sabha constituency.

Chinta Prabhakar of Bharat Rashtra Samithi is currently representing the constituency.

== Mandals ==
The assembly constituency presently comprises the following mandals:

Mandal
Sangareddy
Kondapur
Sadasivpet
Kandi

== Members of Legislative Assembly ==
Year	Member	Political party
Andhra Pradesh
1957	Kishtamachari	Independent
1962	P. Ramachandra Reddy	Indian National Congress
1967	Narasimha Reddy	Independent
1972	P. Ramachandra Reddy	Indian National Congress
1978	Narasimha Reddy	Independent
1983	P. Ramachandra Reddy	Independent
1985	P. Ramachandra Reddy	Indian National Congress
1989	P. Ramachandra Reddy	Indian National Congress
1994	K. Sadasiva Reddy	Telugu Desam Party
1999	K. Satyanarayana	Bharatiya Janata Party
2004	Thurupu Jayaprakash Reddy (Jagga Reddy)	Telangana Rashtra Samithi
2009	Thurupu Jayaprakash Reddy (Jagga Reddy)	Indian National Congress
Telangana
2014	Chinta Prabhakar	Telangana Rashtra Samithi
2018	Thurupu Jayaprakash Reddy (Jagga Reddy)	Indian National Congress
2023	Chinta Prabhakar	Bharat Rashtra Samithi

== Election results ==
=== 2023 ===
Telangana Assembly Elections, 2023: Sangareddy (Assembly constituency)
Party	Candidate	Votes	%	±%
BRS	Chinta Prabhakar	83,112	44.32	+0.10
INC	Jagga Reddy	74,895	39.94	−4.28
BJP	Pulimamidi Raju	20,921	11.15	+6.59
TPSP	Dodla Venkat	2,094	1.12	New
BSP	Kyasaram Pravin Kumar	1,051	0.56	+0.42
Independent	Kolkur Pratap	447	0.24	New
Independent	Neeradi Narsimulu	375	0.20	New
Independent	Kiran Rathod	364	0.19	New
Independent	Bangaru Krishna	364	0.19	New
Independent	Neeradi Narsimulu	375	0.20	New
NOTA	None of the Above	311	0.17	New
BCY	Satyanarayana Goud Kovuri	252	0.13	New
Independent	Posanpally Bapu Reddy	252	0.13	New
Independent	G. Harikanth Reddy	249	0.13	New
Desh Janhit Party	Mohammed Jaweed	226	0.12	New
TECPI	Chandra Mohan	218	0.12	+0.05
BMP	Sheker Palpanoori	174	0.09	+0.03
Independent	Thummalaplly Prithviraj	157	0.08	New
Independent	V. Venkat Reddy	134	0.07	New
Independent	Neeradi Narsimulu	375	0.20	New
Independent	Mede Gopal	124	0.27	New
Independent	Ramesh Yadav	121	0.06	New
Dharma Samaj Party	D. Srinivas	116	0.06	New
IPBP	Narsimlu Thota	110	0.06	New
Independent	Satkula Anjanayulu	98	0.05	New
AIMEP	Police Ramchander	69	0.04	New
VYKP	Regoti Sharath Kumar	67	0.04	New
Independent	Mohamed Saheb Jani	67	0.04	New
BARESP	Methri Manohar	61	0.03	New
Majority		8,217	4.38	+2.83
Turnout		2,87,506		
BRS gain from INC		Swing		

=== 2018 ===
Telangana Assembly Elections, 2018: Sangareddy (Assembly constituency)
Party	Candidate	Votes	%	±%
INC	Jagga Reddy	76,572	45.77	+11.89
TRS	Chinta Prabhakar	73,983	44.22	−8.41
BJP	Deshpande Rajeshwara Rao	7,628	4.56	−3.01
Independent	Police Ramchander	4,140	2.47	New
CPI(M)	Beeram Mallesham	1,340	0.80	−0.90
Independent	Bangaru Krishna	738	0.44	New
Independent	Shaik Zahoor	539	0.32	New
Independent	Thalari Udaya Bhaskar	256	0.15	New
BSP	Mallaiah Gullanigari	230	0.14	−0.34
TECPI	Chandra Mohan	118	0.07	New
AAP	Syed Ghousuddin	105	0.06	New
BMP	Narayana Dandu	100	0.06	New
AYSRCP	Md. Toufiq Ahamed	94	0.06	New
New India Party	Dodla Venkat	69	0.04	New
NOTA	None of the Above	1,402	0.84	+0.21
Majority		2,589	1.55	−17.20
Turnout		1,67,314	82.83	+8.86
INC gain from TRS		Swing		

=== 2014 ===
Telangana Assembly Elections, 2014: Sangareddy (Assembly constituency)
Party	Candidate	Votes	%	±%
TRS	Chinta Prabhakar	82,860	92.63	+91.57
INC	Jagga Reddy	53,338	33.88	+4.14
BJP	K. Sathyanarayana	11,914	7.57	−3.73
CPI(M)	B. Mallesham	2,684	1.70	+1.70
Independent	Kashipuram Praveen Kumar	1,569	1.00	New
YSRCP	Gouraiahgari Sreedhar Reddy	1,198	0.76	New
Independent	Nagedapally Krishnam Raju	818	0.52	New
BSP	K. Vijaya Kumar	758	0.48	−0.35
Voters Party	Dayanand	298	0.19	New
Independent	Sangram Surender	288	0.18	New
Independent	Bathini Ramulu	250	0.16	New
Independent	Rumandla Prakash	244	0.15	New
Independent	P. Ranjith Kumar	241	0.15	New
NOTA	None of the Above	985	0.63	New
Majority		29,522	18.75	+13.85
Turnout		1,57,445	73.97	+1.79
TRS gain from INC		Swing		

=== 2009 ===
Andhra Pradesh Assembly Elections, 2009: Sangareddy (Assembly constituency)
Party	Candidate	Votes	%	±%
INC	Jagga Reddy	41,101	29.74	+29.74
TDP	Chinta Prabhakar	34,329	24.84	+24.84
PRP	Faheem M. A.	21,116	15.28	New
BJP	N. Chandra Shekar	15,616	11.30	−20.07
TRS	Gadila Nawaz Reddy	15,290	11.06	−30.67
Independent	P. Narahari Reddy	2,152	1.56	New
LSP	Patolla Madhava Reddy	1,581	1.14	New
BSP	T. Narsimulu	1,149	0.83	−1.43
Independent	T. Pruthviraj	597	0.43	New
Pyramid Party of India	Chalamala Yasoda Lakshmi	589	0.43	New
Independent	Tahera	534	0.39	New
Independent	Pothuraju Laxmi Narasamma	522	0.38	New
Independent	Shaik Rasheed	485	0.35	New
Independent	Mirza Shamsheer Baig	473	0.34	New
Trilinga Praja Pragati Party	Sadakula Krishnaiah	438	0.32	New
Independent	Hari Shanker Goud	425	0.31	New
Independent	Anantha Rao Kulakarni	420	0.30	New
Independent	Ankena Palli Shrishailam	340	0.25	New
Independent	Gaddamada Narsimlu	295	0.21	New
Independent	Tammali Narsimulu	257	0.19	New
Independent	Ataur Rahman	246	0.18	New
Independent	Azhar Mohd	239	0.17	New
Majority		6,772	4.90	−5.47
Turnout		138,194	72.18	+6.70
INC gain from TRS		Swing		

=== 2004 ===
Andhra Pradesh Assembly Elections, 2004: Sangareddy (Assembly constituency)
Party	Candidate	Votes	%	±%
TRS	Jagga Reddy	71,158	91.73	New
BJP	K. Satyanarayana	53,482	31.37	−10.73
Independent	V. Bhoopal Reddy	26,492	15.54	New
CPI(M)	Chukka Ramulu	13,536	7.94	−0.56
BSP	Manne Vishnu Mudiraj	3,847	2.26	+0.32
MCPI(S)	M. Babu	1,990	1.17	+0.80
Majority		17,676	10.36	−0.05
Turnout		170,505	65.48	+0.95
TRS gain from BJP		Swing		

=== 1999 ===
Andhra Pradesh Assembly Elections, 1999: Sangareddy (Assembly constituency)
Party	Candidate	Votes	%	±%
BJP	K. Satyanarayana	70,522	42.10	+31.63
INC	T. Nandeshwar Goud	53,078	31.69	+7.85
Independent	P. Ramachandra Reddy	21,077	12.58	+12.58'"`UNIQ−−ref−0000002B−QINU`"'
CPI(M)	C. Ramulu	14,244	8.50	New
BSP	M. Balaiah	3,248	1.94	−0.89
Independent	B. Narasimha Reddy	1,656	0.99	New
Independent	Naikawadi Ramulu	913	0.55	New
NCP	P. Mallikarjuna Goud	648	0.39	New
MCPI(S)	Ch. Ashok	620	0.37	New
Independent	Kishan Rao Kasulawada	617	0.37	New
NTRTDP(LP)	N. Vishnu	376	0.22	New
SP	G. Beeraiah Yadav	350	0.21	New
Independent	T. Narsimloo	145	0.09	New
Majority		17,444	10.41	−27.99
Turnout		167,949	64.53	−5.16
BJP gain from TDP		Swing		

=== 1994 ===
Andhra Pradesh Assembly Elections, 1994: Sangareddy (Assembly constituency)
Party	Candidate	Votes	%	±%
TDP	K. Sadasiva Reddy	93,271	62.24	+25.37
INC	P. Ramachandra Reddy	35,721	23.84	−28.76
BJP	P. Veerareddy	15,683	10.47	New
BSP	Y. Shankar Goud	4,237	2.83	+1.27
Independent	Rama Goud	440	0.29	New
Independent	M. Satyanarayana	281	0.19	New
Independent	K. Manohar	223	0.15	New
Majority		57,550	38.40	+22.67
Turnout		149,856	69.69	+4.72
TDP gain from INC		Swing		

=== 1989 ===
Andhra Pradesh Assembly Elections, 1989: Sangareddy (Assembly constituency)
Party	Candidate	Votes	%	±%
INC	P. Ramachandra Reddy	69,918	52.60	+15.79
TDP	R. Srinivas Goud	49,019	36.87	+8.86
AIMIM	Nargis Fatima	10,415	7.83	New
BSP	Bojja Thakaram	2,077	1.56	New
JP	A. Mallanna	640	0.48	New
Independent	T. Venu Gopal	472	0.36	New
Independent	Karam Prakasham	280	0.21	New
Independent	T. Satyanarayana	115	0.09	New
Majority		20,899	15.73	+9.54
Turnout		132,936	64.72	−3.64
INC hold		Swing		

=== 1985 ===
Andhra Pradesh Assembly Elections, 1985: Sangareddy (Assembly constituency)
Party	Candidate	Votes	%	±%
INC	P. Ramachandra Reddy	37,585	36.81	+1.67
Independent	K. Sadasiva Reddy	31,266	30.62	New
TDP	M. Japal	28,600	28.01	New
Independent	Ashok	1,025	1.00	New
Independent	Y. Nagabushanam	891	0.87	New
Independent	T. Ajaiah	753	0.74	New
Independent	Mangula Surershan	559	0.55	New
LKD	Alluri Achyuta Rama Raju	547	0.54	New
Independent	Pokala Krishna Murthy	239	0.23	New
Independent	M. G. Anna Gopal Reddy	187	0.18	New
Independent	Kura Somalingam	170	0.17	New
Independent	Eramani	151	0.15	New
Independent	R. Sardar Patel	145	0.14	New
Majority		6,319	6.19	−0.08
Turnout		102,118	68.36	−2.48
INC gain from Independent		Swing		

=== 1983 ===
Andhra Pradesh Assembly Elections, 1983: Sangareddy (Assembly constituency)
Party	Candidate	Votes	%	±%
Independent	P. Ramachandra Reddy	37,454	41.41	+41.41
INC	Patolla Veerareddy	31,785	35.14	+18.57
Independent	Mukurula Sathyanarayana	15,852	17.53	New
Independent	Ashok	1,025	1.00	New
BJP	Tunki Sudhakar Reddy	4,789	5.29	New
Independent	P. Pundrikakshiah	573	0.63	New
Majority		5,669	6.27	−16.34
Turnout		90,435	70.84	−5.65
Independent gain from Independent		Swing		

== See also ==
- List of constituencies of Telangana Legislative Assembly
