= Methuku Anand =

Indian politician

Methuku Anand (born 4 June 1974) is an Indian politician from Telangana state. He is a former member of the Telangana Legislative Assembly from Vikarabad Assembly constituency, which is reserved for Scheduled Caste community, in Ranga Reddy district, representing the Telangana Rashtra Samithi.

== Early life and education ==
Anand is from Keralli village, Dharur mandal, Vikarabad district, Telangana state. He completed his Master of Surgery at Kakatiya Medical College, which is affiliated with the NTR University of Heath Sciences, Vijayawada in 2005. He declared assets worth Rs.9 crore in his affidavit to the Election Commission of India.

== Career ==
Anand won the Vikarabad Assembly constituency in the 2018 Telangana Legislative Assembly election representing the Telangana Rashtra Samithi. He polled 59,971 votes and defeated his nearest rival, G. Prasad Kumar of the Indian National Congress, by a margin of 3,092 votes. He lost to Kumar in the 2023 Telangana Legislative Assembly election by a margin of 12,893 votes.
