= Pulkurthi =

Pulkurti
- Village
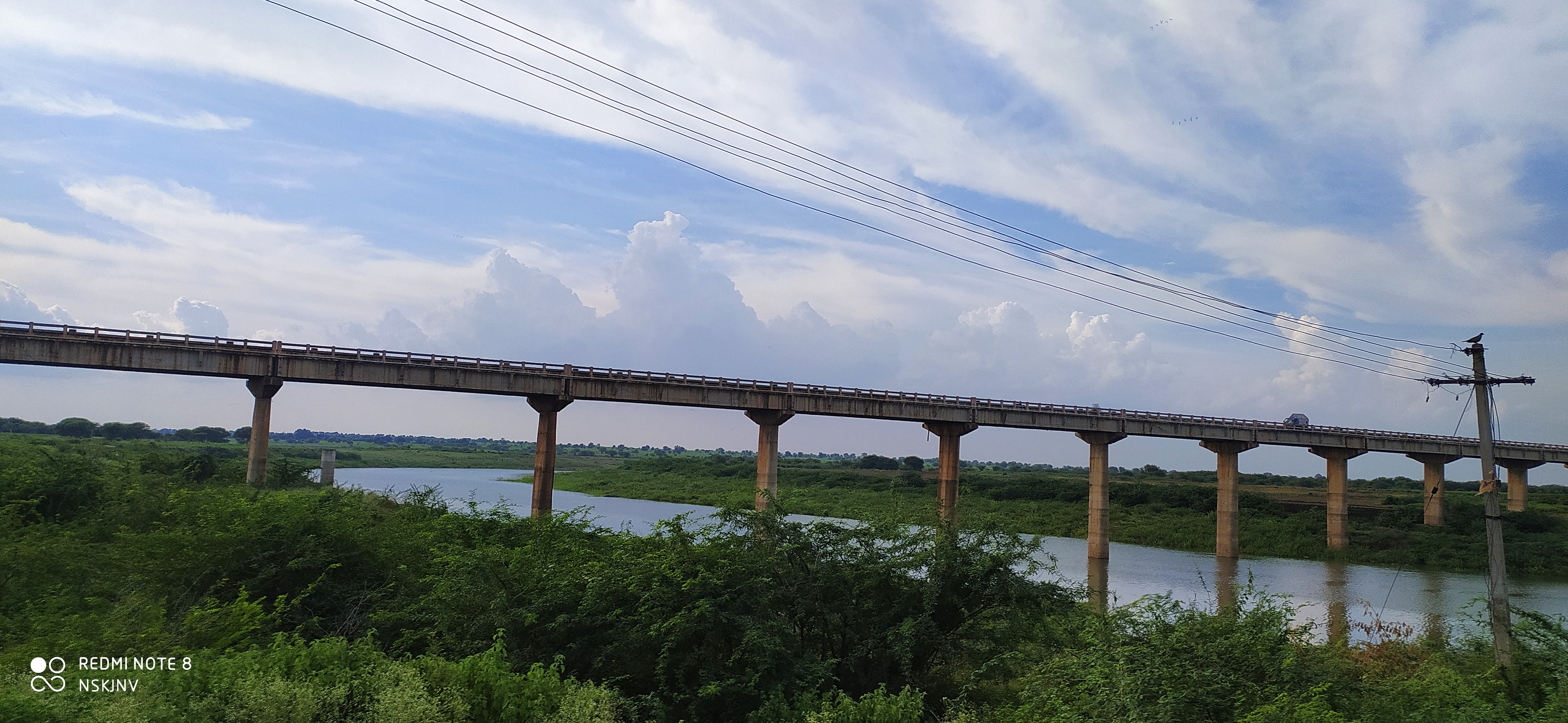
- Pulkurti dam
- Sangareddy Revenue Division: Manoor
- State: Telangana
- District: Sangareddy

Government
  - Type: Gram
  - Body: Panchayat

Languages
  - Official: Telugu
- Time zone: UTC+5:30 (IST)
- PIN: 502286
- Vehicle registration: TS 15
- Lok Sabha constituency: Zaheerabad
- Vidhan Sabha constituency: Narayankhed

Pulkurti is a village located in Telangana state, Sangareddy district. It is located six kilometres (3.7 mi) from its mandal headquarters Manoor.

== Statistical details ==
According to the 2011 Indian Census, the village has 306 houses and a population of 1,596, spread over an area of 889 hectares. The number of males in the village is 738 and the number of females is 858. The number of scheduled castes is 421 while the number of scheduled tribes is 2. The census location code of the village is 572762 .

== Land usage ==
The land use in Pulkurti (Manur) is as follows:

Non-agricultural land: 7 ha (17 acres)

Barren land: 109 ha (270 acres)

Net sown land: 773 ha (1,910 acres)

Land without water: 882 ha (2,180 acres)
