= A. Chandrasekhar =

Indian politician

Agama Chandrasekhar (born 1959) is an Indian politician from Telangana state. He is a former five time member of the Andhra Pradesh Legislative Assembly from Vikarabad Assembly constituency, which was reserved for the Scheduled Caste community, in the erstwhile Ranga Reddy district of the undivided Andhra Pradesh. He was elected on the Telugu Desam Party ticket for four terms in 1985, 1989, 1994, 1999 and on Telangana Rashtra Samithi ticket in 2004. He served as a Minister for Fisheries in the TDP government.

== Early life and education ==
Chandrasekhar is from Vikarabad, Ranga Reddy district, Telangana state. He is the son of the late Agama Balaiah. He completed his BVSc in 1983 and later did his LLB at Osmania University in 2018. He declared assets worth Rs.5 crore in his affidavit to the Election Commission of India.

== Career ==
Chandrasekhar first became an MLA winning the Vikarabad Assembly constituency in the 1985 Andhra Pradesh Legislative Assembly election representing the Telugu Desam Party. He polled 38,465 votes and defeated his nearest rival, Devadas, an independent candidate, by a margin of 20,361 votes. He retained the seat for the Telugu Desam in the 1989 Andhra Pradesh Legislative Assembly election garnering 41,564 votes and beating the Indian National Congress (Indira) candidate, V.B.Thirumaliah, by a margin of 3,969 votes. He won for the third consecutive from the Vikarabad seat winning the 1994 Andhra Pradesh Legislative Assembly election where he polled 59,864 votes and defeated his closest opponent, Begari Sanjeeva Rao, an independent candidate, by 27,893 votes. He won for the fourth straight time on TDP ticket, in the 1999 Andhra Pradesh Legislative Assembly election, where he bagged 52,733 votes and defeated Begari Madhura Veni of the Indian National Congress, by a margin fo 203 votes. Later, he shifted to the Telangana Rashtra Samithi and won the 2004 Andhra Pradesh Legislative Assembly election, where he polled 56,647 and defeated Madhura Veni, who contested this time on the TDP ticket, by a margin of 2001 votes. In 2018 election, he contested as an independent candidate but lost. In 2018, he finished behind winner Anantha Methuku of TRS and second placed Gaddam Prasad Kumar of the Congress.

In 2023, he quit the BJP and joined the Indian National Congress.
