= Heritage Jail Museum =

Prison museum in India

- Established: 1796; 230 years ago
- Location: Sangareddy, Sangareddy district
- Coordinates: 17.630175°N 78.086844°E

Heritage Jail Museum also known as Jail Museum and Sangareddy District Jail is a 220-year-old colonial-era jail in India, now converted into a museum. It is located in Sangareddy, Sangareddy district of the Indian state Telangana. The jail allows tourists to live a prisoner's life for 24 hours at a price of Rs.500 ($A9.90). The museum displays the paintings and other artifacts related to crime and prison life in India.

== History ==
According to the PWD Records, this prison was built during the Prime Ministership of Salar Jung I in 1796 A.D., during Nizam rule in the princely state of Hyderabad. It was closed in 2012.

== Museum ==
In June 2016, the jail was converted into a museum by prison department, when M. Lakshmi Narasimha, the Deputy SP of the jail came up with the "Feel The Jail" programme in which the public can experience jail life for twenty-four hours without committing a crime by paying ₹500. They will be required to do labour, such as gardening, will be berated by the guards, eat prison food, and wear uniform. Mobile phones are secured in a locker before the start of the programme. A fine is issued if a person wishes to leave early.

== See also ==
- List of jail and prison museums
