= Mandol =

Mandol may refer to:

- Mandol (antibiotic), the antibiotic cefamandole
- Algerian mandole or mandol, a musical instrument
- Mandol District, in Nuristan Province, Afghanistan

== See also ==
- Mandal (disambiguation)
- Mandolin, a musical instrument
- Mandolute, a musical instrument
