= Chinta Prabhakar =

Indian politician

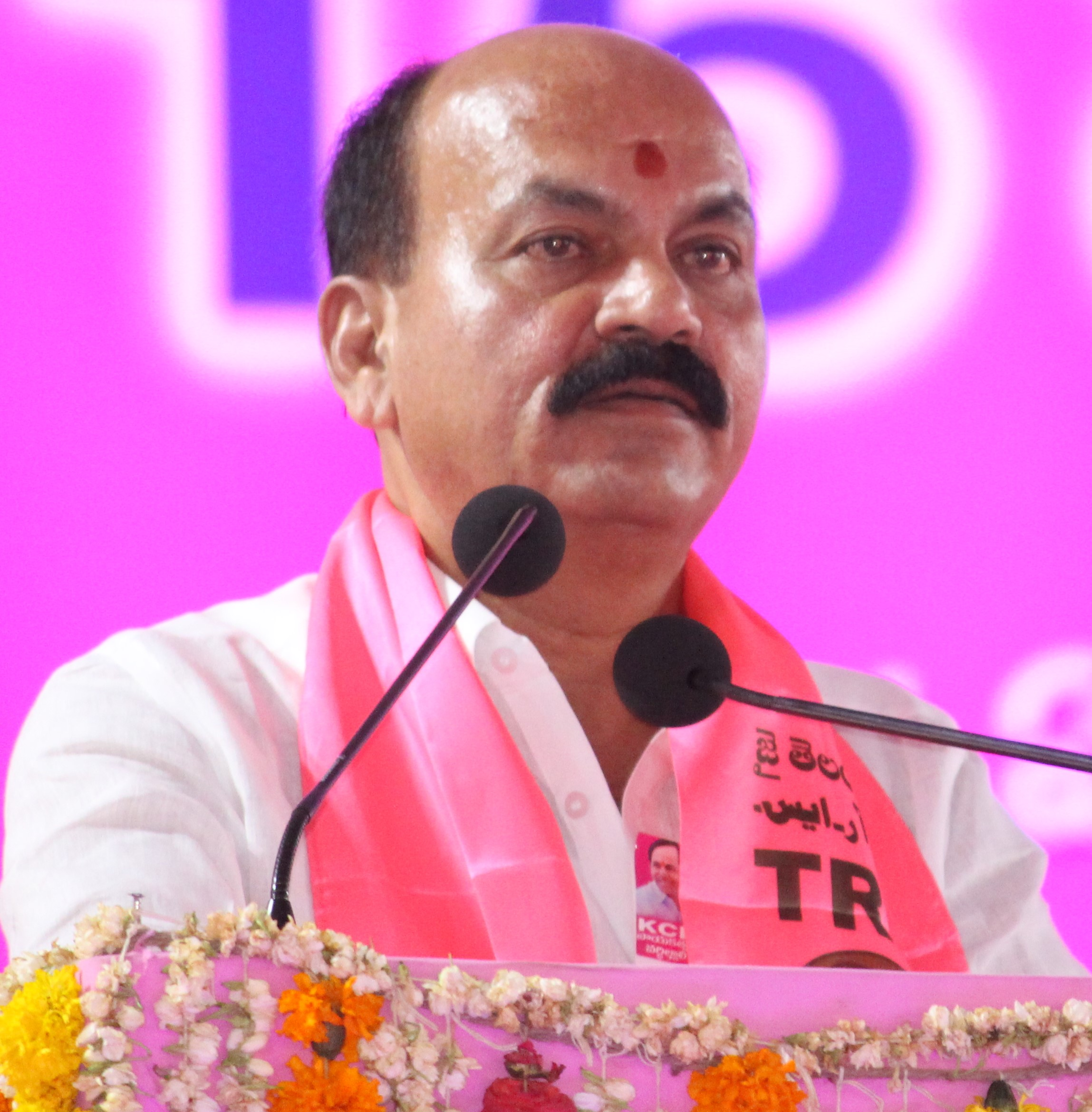

Member of the Telangana Legislative Assembly
- Incumbent
- Assumed office 3 December 2023
- Preceded by: Jagga Reddy
- In office June 2014 – December 2018
- Preceded by: Jagga Reddy
- Succeeded by: Jagga Reddy

Personal details
- Born: 10 August 1959 (age 67) Sadasivpet, Medak district, Andhra Pradesh (present–day Sangareddy district, Telangana), India
- Party: Bharat Rashtra Samithi (2011–present)
- Other political affiliations: Independent, Telugu Desam Party

Chinta Prabhakar (born 10 August 1959) is an Indian politician from Telangana state. He is a member of the Telangana Legislative Assembly from Sangareddy Assembly constituency in Sangareddy district. He represents Bharat Rashtra Samithi and won the 2023 Telangana Legislative Assembly election.

== Early life and education ==
Prabhakar is from Sangareddy, Telangana. His late father, Chinta Nagabhushanam, was a farmer. He belongs to Padmasalicommunity. He did his schooling at Government High School, Sadasivpet, Sangareddy district and passed out in the year 1976.

== Career ==
Prabhakar started his political career with Telugu Desam Party. He served as the chairman of Sangareddy Municipality. Later, he moved to TRS and won as an MLA for the first time in the 2014 Andhra Pradesh Legislative Assembly election. He lost the 2018 Assembly election to Turupu Jayaprakash Reddy of Indian National Congress but regained the Sangareddy Assembly constituency seat representing Bharat Rashtra Samithi in the 2023 Telangana Legislative Assembly election. He polled 83,112 votes and defeated his nearest rival, Jagga Reddy of Indian National Congress, by a margin of 8,217 votes.
