= Government Medical College, Sangareddy =

Government Medical College

- Type: Government
- Established: 2022; 3 years ago
- Location: Sangareddy, Telangana, India; 17.6262485°N 78.076653°E
- Campus: Sub-urban
- Website: gmcsangareddy.org
- Location in Telangana Government Medical College, Sangareddy (India)

Government Medical College, Sangareddy is a medical college located in Sangareddy.

== History ==
The building was constructed at a cost of ₹30 crore and the construction was completed in 2022. The college was permitted to start classes from the academic year 2022-2023 with an intake of 150 undergraduate students.

The college was inaugurated as part of 8 medical colleges inaugurated by K. Chandrashekhar Rao on November 15, 2022.
