= B. Sanjeeva Rao =

Indian politician

B. Sanjeeva Rao (9 May 1953 – 25 February 2020) is an Indian politician from Telangana state. He was a former Member of the Telangana Legislative Assembly from Vikarabad Assembly constituency representing the Bharat Rashtra Samithi.

== Early life ==
Rao was from Gate Vanampalli village, Nawabpet mandal, now in Vikarabad district, Telangana. His father B. Devadas was a farmer. He completed his B.Sc. in agriculture and later did a PG Diploma course in Plant Production at Acharya NG Ranga University. He declared assets worth Rs.19 lakhs in his affidavit to the Election Commission of India in 2014 and declared that he had no criminal cases against him.

== Career ==
Rao won the Vikarabad Assembly constituency in the 2014 Andhra Pradesh Legislative Assembly election representing the Telangana Rashtra Samithi. He polled 64,592 votes and defeated his nearest rival, G. Prasad Kumar of the Indian National Congress, by a margin of 10,072 votes.
