= Peddapur =

Peddapur Peddapuram
- village
- Location in Telangana, India
- Coordinates: 18.808331°N 78.655028°E
- Country: India
- State: Telangana
- Region: Deccan Plateau
- District: Jagitial
- Talukas: Koratla

Government
  - Member of Parliament: Dharmapuri Arvind
  - Member of the Legislative Assembly: VidhyaSagar Rao Kalvakuntla
  - Sarpanch: Peddapalli Sathya Sagar

Area
  - Total: 16 km^{2} (6.2 sq mi)
- Elevation: 287 m (942 ft)

Population
  - Total: 2,500
  - Density: 160/km^{2} (400/sq mi)

Languages
  - Official: Telugu
- Time zone: UTC+5:30 (IST)
- PIN: 505325
- Telephone code: 91-8725
- Vehicle registration: TG21
- Literacy: 60%
- Lok Sabha constituency: Nizamabad
- Vidhan Sabha constituency: Koratla
- Avg. annual temperature: 32 °C (90 °F)
- Avg. summer temperature: 40 °C (104 °F)
- Avg. winter temperature: 20 °C (68 °F)

Peddapur is a village in Koratla mandal of Jagtial district, Telangana.
