= Jagga Reddy =

Indian politician

Jayaprakash Reddy
- Jagga Reddy
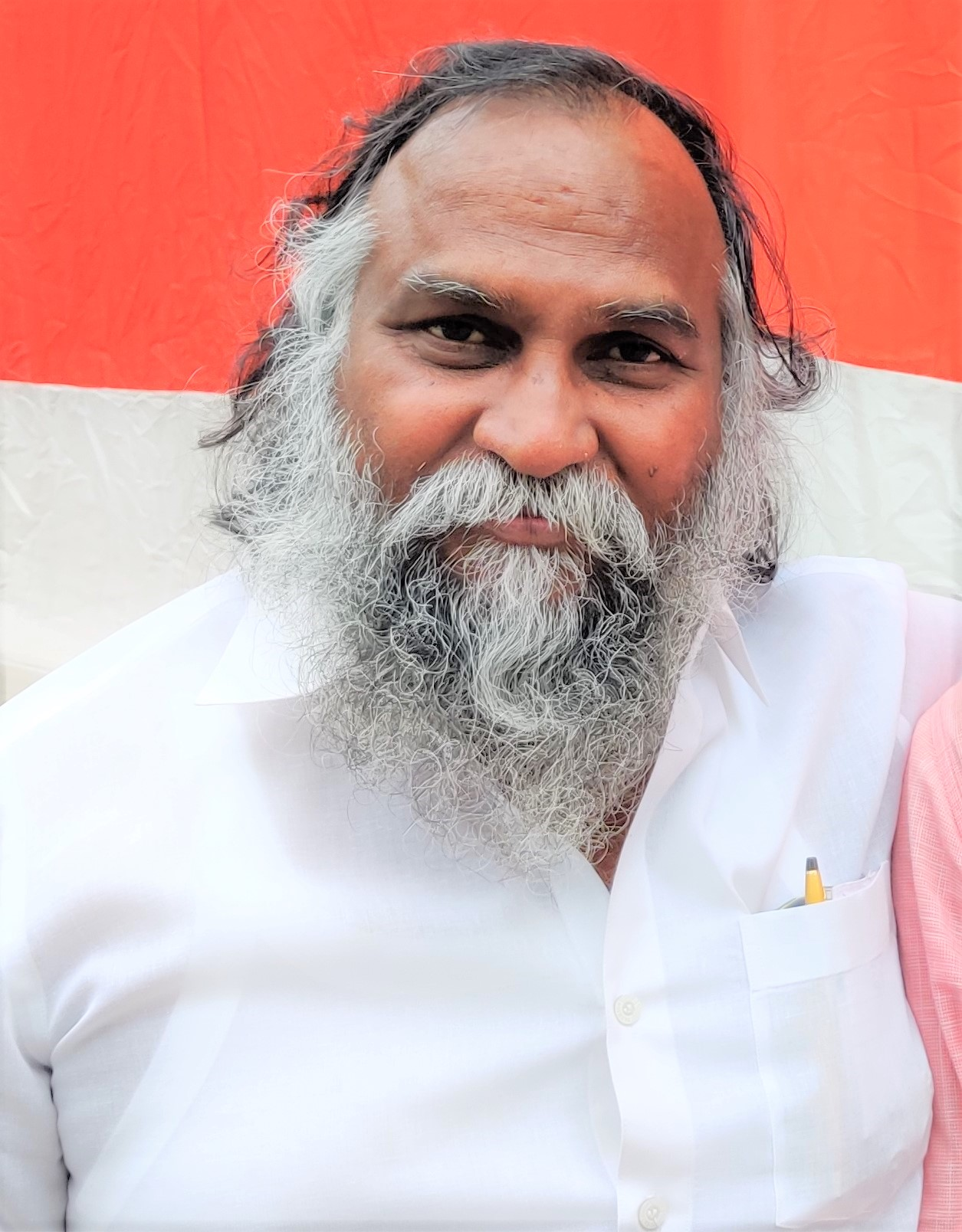

Member of Telangana Legislative Assembly
- In office 2018–2023
- Preceded by: Chinta Prabhakar
- Succeeded by: Chinta Prabhakar
- Constituency: Sangareddy

Member of Andhra Pradesh Legislative Assembly
- In office 2004–2014
- Constituency: Sangareddy

Working President of Telangana Pradesh Congress Committee
- Incumbent
- Assumed office 28 June 2021

Personal details
- Born: Aredla Jagadeeshwar Reddy; 7 July 1966 (age 59) Indrakaran, Medak district, India
- Party: Indian National Congress
- Spouse: Nirmala
- Children: 2
- Occupation: Politician

T Jayaprakash Reddy, popularly known as Jagga Reddy, is an Indian politician who is the Working President of Telangana Pradesh Congress Committee since 28 June 2021. He was a member of the Telangana Legislative Assembly for Sangareddy constituency from 2018 to 2023.

== Political career ==
He started career as a councilor in BJP and then became municipal chairman. He won as TRS MLA in 2004, left the party to join the Congress. He was re-elected in 2009, but had lost in 2014. He contested 2014 by poll from Medak (Lok Sabha constituency) being BJP candidate and lost. He again joined Congress in 2015.

== Electoral History ==
Year	Constituency	Party	Votes	%	Opponent	Opponent Party	Opponent Votes	%	Result	Margin	%
2004	Sangareddy	TRS	51,101	42.06%	K. Satyanarayana	TDP	34,674	28.54%	Won	16,427	13.52%
2009	Sangareddy	INC	60,375	42.12%	Chinta Prabhakar	TRS	45,203	31.54%	Won	15,172	10.58%
2014	Sangareddy	INC	53,338	32.22%	Chinta Prabhakar	TRS	82,860	50.06%	Lost	-29,522	-17.84%
2014 (By)	Medak	BJP	186,334	17.65%	Kotha Prabhakar Reddy	TRS	547,611	51.87%	Lost (3rd)	-361,277	-34.22%
2018	Sangareddy	INC	76,572	46.20%	Chinta Prabhakar	TRS	73,983	44.60%	Won	2,589	1.60%
2023	Sangareddy	INC	74,895	39.94%	Chinta Prabhakar	BRS	83,112	44.32%	Lost	-8,217	-4.38%

== Allegations ==
In September 2018 he was detained on charges of impersonation, forgery, cheating and human trafficking on allegations that Reddy in 2004 trafficked three persons from Hyderabad to the United States using passports secured on the names of his wife, daughter and son.
