= Dharur, Vikarabad district =

Dharur
- village
- Country: India
- State: Telangana
- District: Vikarabad
- Established: 1630
- Founder: Abdullah Qutub Shah 1
- Talukas: Dharur

Population (2011 Census)
  - Total: 6,029

Languages
  - Official: Telugu & Hindi
- Time zone: UTC+5:30 (IST)
- PIN: 501121
- Vehicle registration: TS 34
- Website: www.vikarabad.telangana.gov.in

Dharur is a village in Vikarabad district of the Indian state of Telangana. It is located in Dharur mandal of Vikarabad revenue division. It was in the Rangareddy district of the erstwhile combined Andhra Pradesh. There are 1140 households as per 2011 census. Dharur mandal has 38 villages and the sex ratio is 1005 females to 1000 males.

Veerabhadreswara Temple

It is a historic temple (History is not known) with 2.5 feet shiv linga, 3.5 feet Veerabhadreshwara statue. Height of the Nandi is 2.5 feet.
