= Mandahl, U.S. Virgin Islands =

Coordinates: 18.35551°N 64.898476°W

Mandahl or Mandal is a settlement on the Northside of the island of St. Thomas in the United States Virgin Islands.

Yvonne E. Milliner Bowsky Elementary School (formerly Peace Corps Elementary School) is located on the site of the former Mandahl Plantation factory.

The Buddhist Nirvana Temple is in Mandahl. For many years, there was also a small hotel, the Inn at Mandahl.

Mandahl Bay and Mandahl Salt Pond are home to a mangrove lagoon and numerous animals. There is an environmental camp by the salt pond.

== Gallery ==
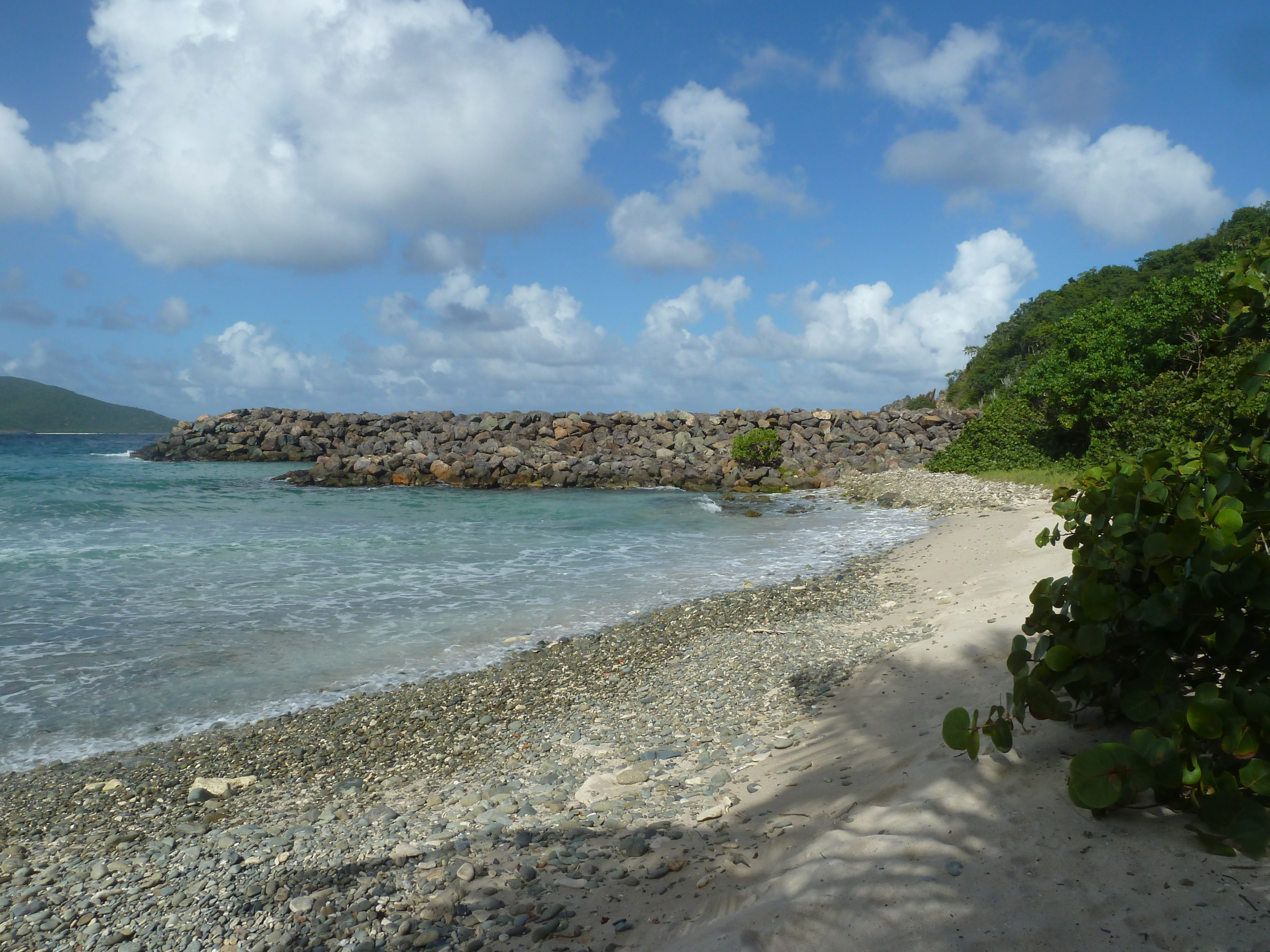
Mandahl Bay Beach

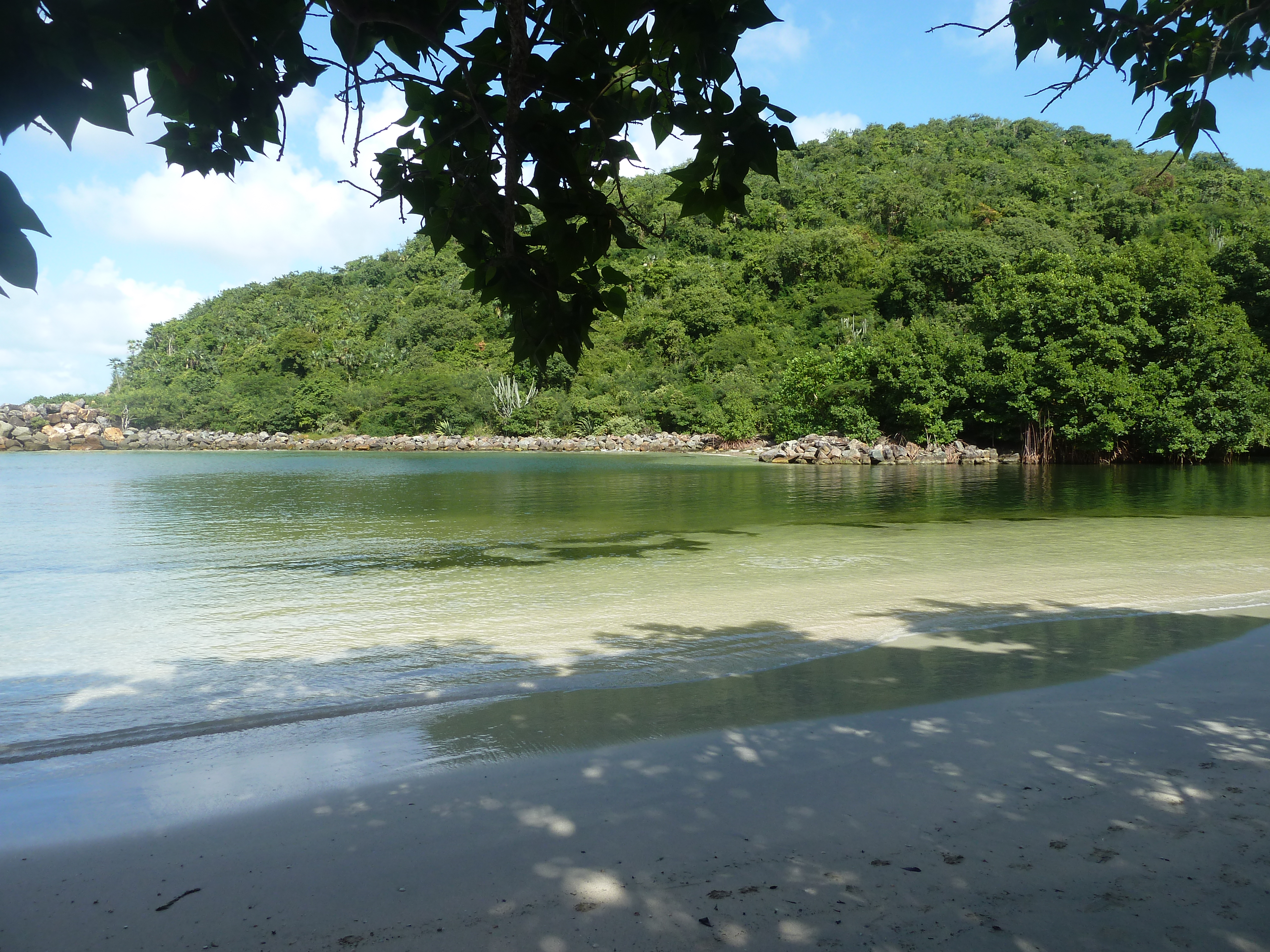
Mandahl Bay Salt Pond

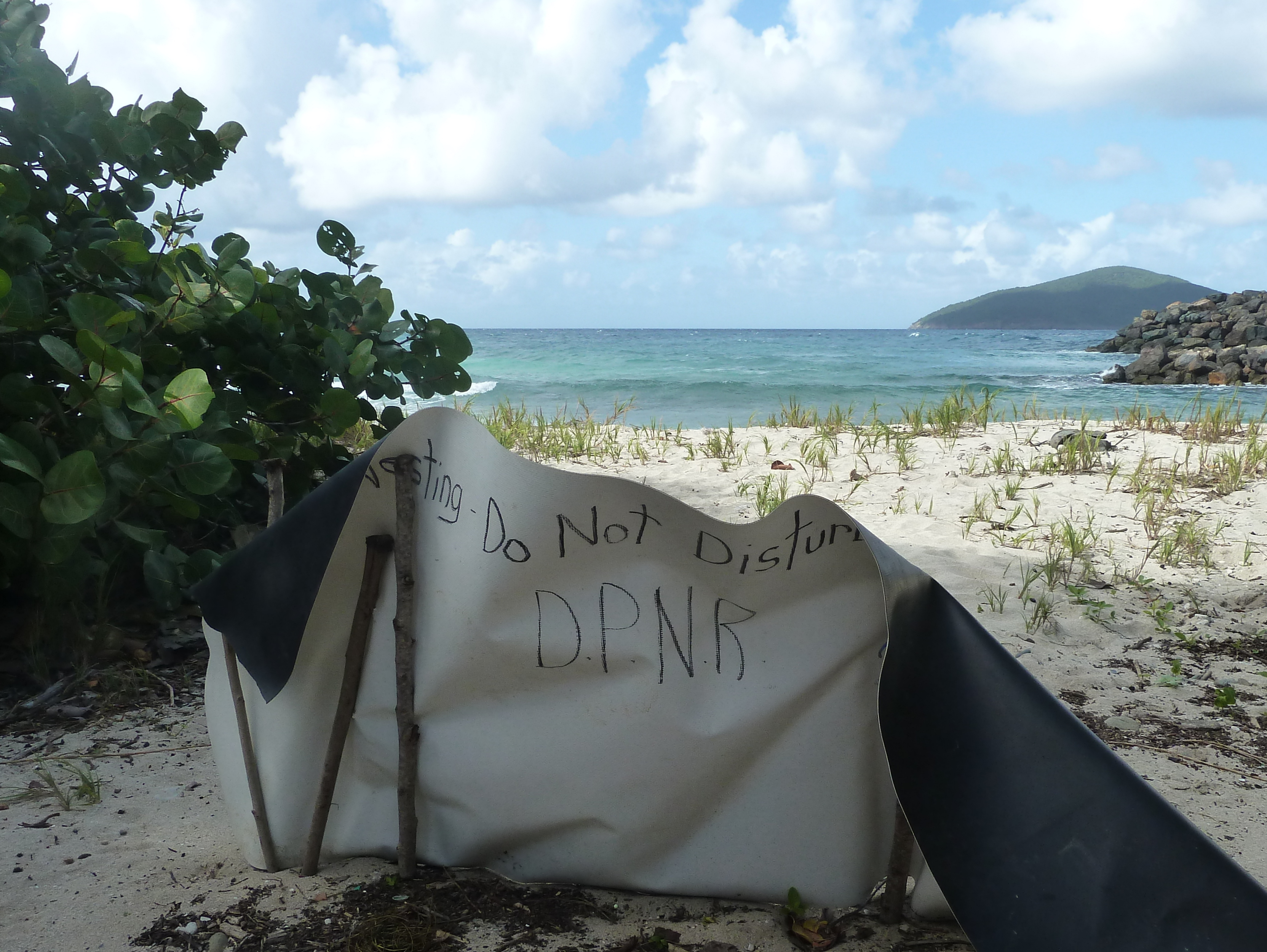
Turtle nesting site, Mandahl Bay
