= Hinduism in Telangana =

Hinduism in the Indian state

Hinduism in Telangana encompasses a diverse range of traditions, practices, and beliefs. Certain elements unite Hindus in the state. These include the worshiping of a pantheon of gods and goddesses, engagement in yoga and meditation, and the celebration of festivals such as Diwali and Holi.

Telangana was a religious and cultural hub in the past, as it was home to the Satavahana Empire that lasted for centuries, beginning in the second century BCE. During the 17th century, the Qutb Shahi dynasty governed the area and constructed mosques and other Islamic structures. Nonetheless, Hinduism retained its dominant position.

Hinduism remains the dominant religion in Telangana, with over 85% of the population identifying as Hindus. The state is home to important Hindu pilgrimage sites, including Yadadri temple, Bhadrachalam temple, and Ramappa temple.

== Cultural Identity ==
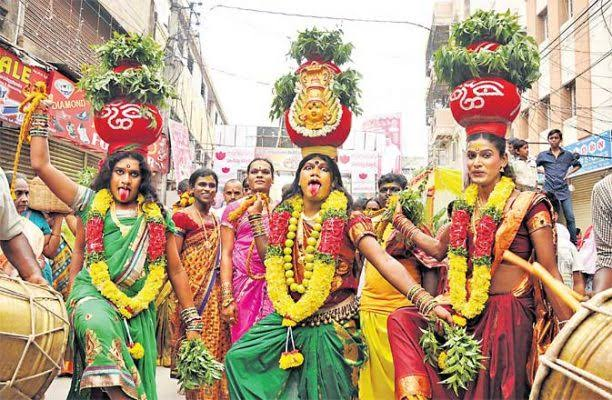
Telangana Bonalu A Hindu Festival

Hinduism influenced language, literature, arts, music, dance, and festivals (such as Bonalu). Epics such as the Ramayana and Mahabharata, and ancient scriptures such as the Vedas and Upanishads form the culture's foundation.
