= Sadasivpet =

Sadashivpet
- Town
- Sadashivpet (Telangana) Sadashivpet (India)
- Coordinates: 17.620300°N 77.953900°E
- Country: India
- State: Telangana
- District: Sangareddy district
- Revenue Division: Sangareddy
- Revenue Mandal: Sadashivapet

Government
  - Type: Municipal Council
  - Body: Sadashivpet Municipal Council

Area
  - Total: 21.70 km^{2} (8.38 sq mi)
- Elevation: 571 m (1,873 ft)

Languages
  - Official: Telugu
- Time zone: UTC+5:30 (IST)
- PIN: 502291
- Telephone code: 08455
- Vehicle registration: TG 15
- MLA: Chinta Prabhakar
- Website: telangana.gov.in

Sadashivpet is a town in Sangareddy district of the Indian state of Telangana.

== Geography ==
Sadashivpet is located at 17.6167°N 77.9500°E. It has an average elevation of 534 meters (1755 feet). From Sadashivpet to Hyderabad 65 km, Vikarabad 36 km, Sadashivpet Road Railway Station 18 km, Bidar 69 km, Zahirabad 36 km, Gulbarga 154 km, SangaReddy 20 km.

== Demographics ==
As of 2001 India census, Sadashivpet had a population of 35,475. Males constitute 51% of the population and females 49%. Sadashivpet has an average literacy rate of 63%, higher than the national average of 59.5%: male literacy is 71%, and female literacy is 54%. In Sadashivpet, 15% of the population is under 6 years of age.

== Government and politics ==
Civic administration

Sadashivpet Municipality was constituted in 1947 and is classified as a third grade municipality with 26 election wards. The jurisdiction of the civic body is spread over an area of 21.70 km^{2} (8.38 mi^{2}).
