= Vikarabad =

Town in Telangana, India

Vikarabad Gangawaram
- Town & District Headquarters
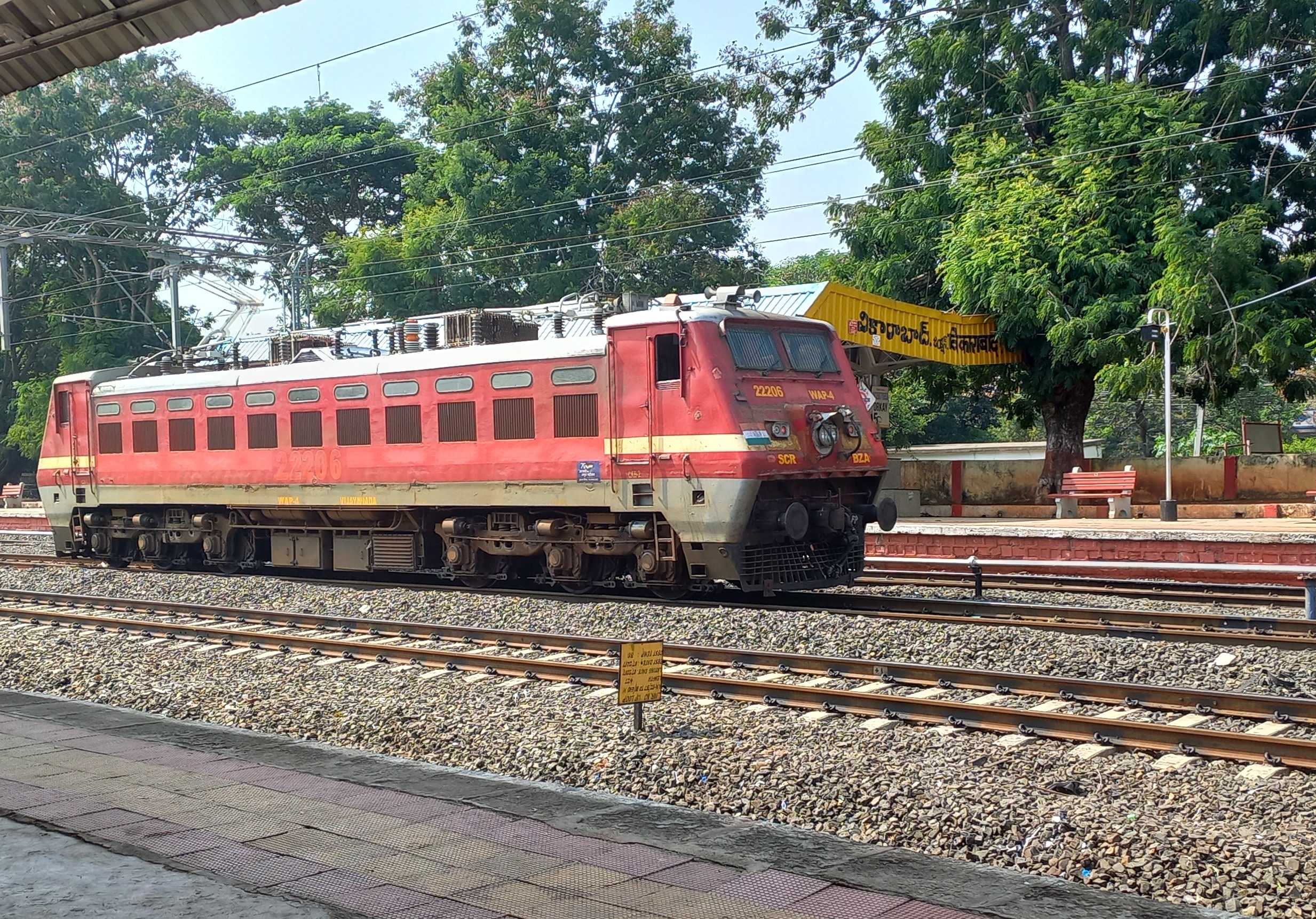
- Vikarabad is a Junction on Secunderabad Wadi Railway line

- Location in Telangana, India Vikarabad (India)
- Coordinates: 17.33°N 77.90°E
- Country: India
- State: Telangana
- District: Vikarabad
- Lok Sabha constituency: Chevella
- Assembly constituency: Vikarabad
- Established: H.E. Nawab Sir Vikar-ul-Umrah Bahadur

Government
  - Type: Mayor
  - Body: Vikarabad Municipal council

Area
  - Total: 31.70 km^{2} (12.24 sq mi)
- Elevation: 638 m (2,093 ft)

Population (2011)
  - Total: 53,143
  - Density: 1,676/km^{2} (4,342/sq mi)

Languages
  - Official: Telugu & Urdu
- Time zone: UTC+5:30 (IST)
- PIN: 501101
- Telephone code: 08416
- Vehicle registration: TG 34
- Website: vikarabad.telangana.gov.in

Vikarabad, formerly known as Gangawaram, is a town and mandal in Vikarabad district of the Indian state of Telangana. It is located in Vikarabad mandal of Vikarabad revenue division.

== History ==
The ancient name of Vikarabad was Gangawaram. Vikarabad was named after the fifth Paigah Amir (Premier noble) H.E. Nawab Sir Vikar-ul-Umrah Bahadur, Sikander Jung, Iqbal-ud-Daula and Iqtadar-ul-Mulk, Nawab Muhammed Fazaluddin Khan KCIE, who served as prime minister of Hyderabad State and Berar Province between 1893 and 1901.

== Demographics ==
As of 2001 India census, Vikarabad had a population of 53,185. Males constitute 26,422 of the population and females 26,763. Vikarabad has an average literacy rate of 64%, higher than the national average of 59.5%: male literacy is 72%, and female literacy is 57%. In Vikarabad, 13% of the population is under 6 years of age.

== Government and politics ==
Vikarabad Municipality is the urban local body that oversees the civic needs of the town.

=== Politics ===
Vikarabad is an assembly constituency in Telangana State. MLAs representing the town have been:

- 2023.Gaddam Prasad kumar (Indian National Congress)
- 2019. Metuku Anand (Telangana Rashtra Samithi)
- 2014 B. Sanjeeva Rao (Telangana Rashtra Samithi)
- 2009 G. Prasad Kumar (Indian National Congress)
- 2008( by election) G. Prasad Kumar (Indian National Congress)
- 2004 A.Chandra Shekar (Telangana Rashtra Samithi)
- 1999 A. Chandra sekhar (Telugu Desam Party)
- 1994 A. Chandra sekhar (Telugu Desam Party)
- 1989 A. Chandra sekhar (Telugu Desam Party)
- 1985 A. Chandra sekhar (Telugu Desam Party)
- 1983 K.R.K. Swami (Indian National Congress)
- 1978 V.B. Tirumalaiah (Indian National Congress)
- 1972 V.B. Tirumalaiah (Independent)
- 1967 A. Ramaswami (Indian National Congress)
- 1962 A. Ramaswami (Indian National Congress)
- 1957 Marri Chenna Reddy (Indian National Congress)
- 1957 A. Ramaswami (Indian National Congress)
- 1952 Marri Chenna Reddy (Indian National Congress)
- 1952 A. Ramaswami (Indian National Congress)

== Tourism ==
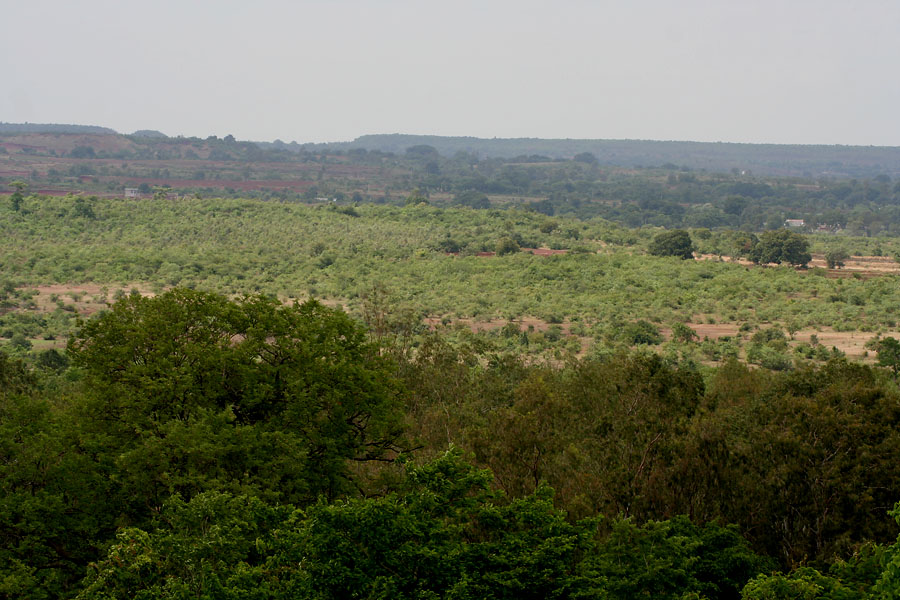
View of Ananthagiri forest, in the vikarabad district of Telangana, India.

- Ananthagiri Temple in the village of Ananthagiri, 6 km far from Vikarabad Mandal.
- Ananthagiri Hills, a forest region which is home to the Anantha Padmanabha Swamy temple. and the source of the Musi River. Telangana's second largest tuberculosis hospital is located in the Ananthagiri hills.
- Kotepally dam which is situated around 20 kilometers away from Ananthagiri hills attracts over 10000 tourists in the weekends and Kayaking at Kotepally dam is a water sports activity for which tourists are sometimes made wait hours to get their turn to high influx of tourists.

== Transport ==
Vikarabad Junction railway station is located on the Vikarabad–Parli section of Secunderabad railway division of South Central Railway zone.

== Education ==
In 2023 a government medical college was opened in the town.
