= Sangareddy =

Sangareddy Sanga Reddy
- City
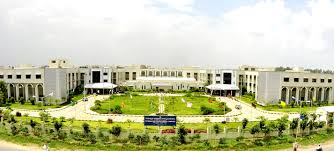
- Collectorate building of Sangareddy

- Location in Telangana, India Sangareddy (India)
- Coordinates: 17°36′43″N 78°04′55″E
- Country: India
- State: Telangana
- District: Sangareddy
- Metro: Hyderabad Metropolitan Region
- City: Hyderabad
- Municipal Established: 1954 (72 years ago)
- Named for: Sanga

Government
  - Type: Municipal Council
  - Body: Sangareddy Municipal Corporation
  - MLA: Chinta Prabhakar
  - District collector: Smt. Praavinya reddy, IAS

Area
  - City: 13.70 km^{2} (5.29 sq mi)
- Elevation: 496 m (1,627 ft)

Population (2011)
  - City: 72,344
  - Rank: 21st in Telangana
  - Density: 5,281/km^{2} (13,680/sq mi)
  - Metro: 325,000

Languages
  - Official: Telugu, Urdu
- Time zone: UTC+5:30 (IST)
- PIN: 502 001
- Telephone code: code-08455
- Vehicle registration: TG-15

Sangareddy, formerly Sangareddipet is a city and district headquarters of the Sangareddy district in the Indian state of Telangana. It was named on Rani Shankaramma's father name Sangareddy, Maharani Shankaramma was a ruler of Andole dynasty(Papannapeta Samasthanam) during the Nizam era.Sangareddy district is located in western part of Telangana state. Sengareddy is the largest city in the Sangareddy district and the sixth largest city in the state. It has 28 mandals, 4 revenue divisions, 11 municipalities, 647 gram panchayats, area 4,464 sq. km.

== Government and politics ==
=== Civic administration ===
The Sangareddy Municipality, classified as a first grade municipality with 38 election wards, was created in 1954. The jurisdiction of the civic body is spread over an area of 13.69 km^{2} (5.29 mi^{2}). The city is spread over an urban area of 45 km^{2} (17 mi^{2}).

== Economy ==
The city has three large-scale public sector industries. These are Bharat Heavy Electricals Limited (one of the Maharatna companies of the Indian government), Bharat Dynamics Limited (where one of India's most powerful missiles, Prithvi, was produced), and Ordnance Factory Medak (which manufactures the Sarath tanks for the Indian Army).

The city includes the Old Sangareddy and New Sangareddy sections. Old Sangareddy is known for its bazaars and old district jail, which has been converted to a jail museum and now called Heritage Jail Museum.

Monin, a French liquor company, has started to build a manufacturing facility in the district.

== Education ==
There are a variety of educational institutions in Sangareddy. The campus of Indian Institute of Technology Hyderabad, one of India's premier institutes, is located very close to Sangareddy, in the village of Kandi. There is the Government Medical College, Sangareddy.

== Transportation ==
=== Roads ===
NH-65 road passes through the city.

About 15 km away from Sangareddy is an outer ring road which connects to Shamshabad airport – Rajiv Gandhi International Airport, Hyderabad, Gachibowli, and Medchal.

A bypass road to NH44 is linked from Sangareddy to Shadnagar through Chevella.

Long distance travel options are also available from Sangareddy to Tirupati, Vizag, Vijayawada, and Kandukooru directly.

=== Rail ===
The nearest railway stations are Shankarpalli railway station which is about 22 km away, Lingampally, which is about 30 km away, Secunderabad (about 50 km away) and Nampally Station, which is around 53 km away. Zahirabad Railway Station which is about 55 km away.

=== Air ===
The nearest air transport facility is Hyderabad International Airport, which is 70 km from Sangareddy.

== Demographics ==
Religion in Sangareddy
1. Hinduism (62.4%)
2. Islam (34.4%)
3. Christianity (1.80%)
4. Others (1.40%)

The city had a population of 72,344 as of the 2011 census.

== Climate ==
Sangareddy has been ranked 8th best “National Clean Air City” under (Category 3 population under 3 lakhs cities) in India.

Historical population
Year	Pop.	±% p.a.
1911	5,947	—
1921	4,588	−2.56%
1931	5,227	+1.31%
1941	6,927	+2.86%
1951	8,084	+1.56%
1961	9,762	+1.90%
1971	17,227	+5.84%
1981	31,360	+6.17%
1991	50,123	+4.80%
2001	57,113	+1.31%
2011	72,344	+2.39%

== Media ==
The Telugu dailies publishers in the city are Eenadu, Andhra Jyothy, and Sakshi. Apart from the local language, there are also English papers such as The Hindu, The Times of India, and The Hans India.

== Notable people ==
- Anudeep K. V., Film director
- Jagga Reddy, Former MLA
