= Vikarabad Assembly constituency =

Constituency of the Telangana legislative assembly in India

Coordinates: 17.34°N 77.90°E

Vikarabad
- Constituency No. 55 for the Telangana Legislative Assembly
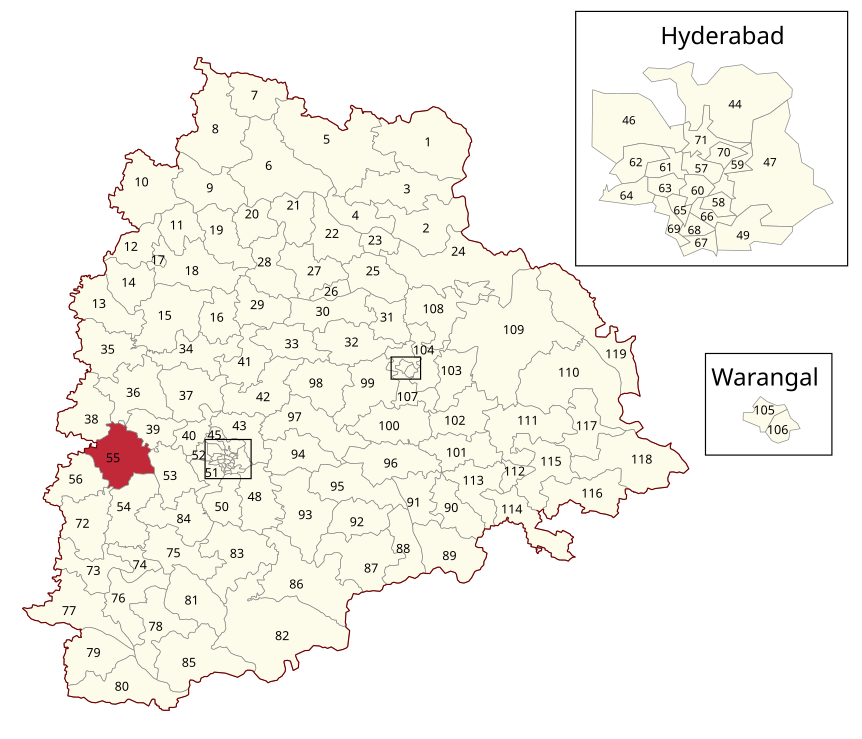
- Location of Vikarabad Assembly constituency within Telangana

Constituency details
- Country: India
- Region: South India
- State: Telangana
- District: Vikarabad
- Lok Sabha constituency: Chevella
- Established: 1951
- Total electors: 1,95,906
- Reservation: SC

Member of Legislative Assembly
- 3rd Telangana Legislative Assembly
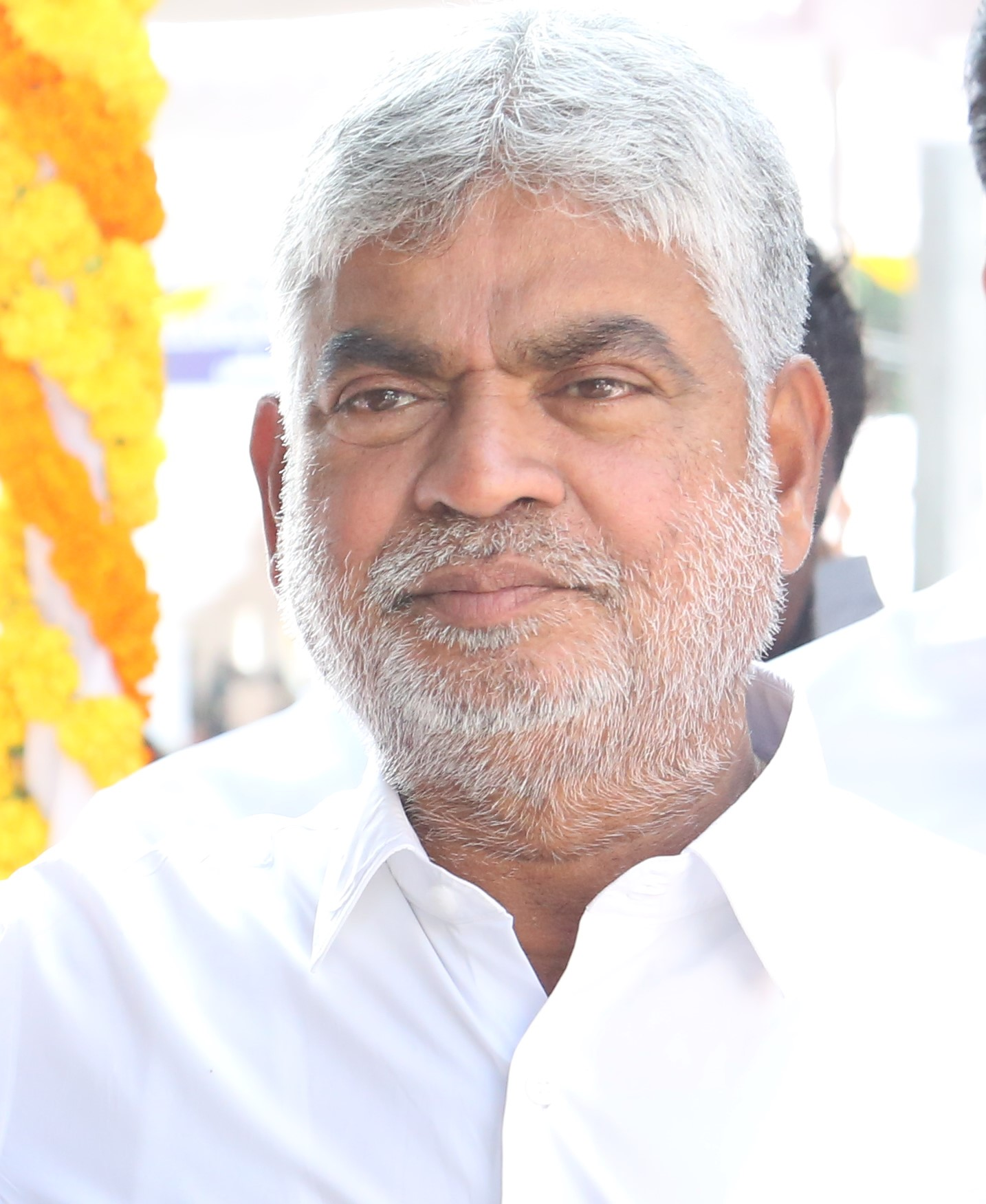
- Incumbent Gaddam Prasad Kumar
- Party: INC
- Elected year: 2023

Vikarabad Assembly constituency is constituency of the Telangana Legislative Assembly, in India. It is one of four constituencies in the Vikarabad district. It is part of Chevella Lok Sabha constituency.

Gaddam Prasad Kumar of Indian National Congress the seat in the 2023 assembly election.

== Mandals ==
The assembly constituency comprises the following mandals:

Mandal
Vikarabad
Marpalle
Mominpet
Dharur
Bantwaram
Kotpalli

== Members of Legislative Assembly ==
Year	Member	Political party
United Andhra Pradesh
1957	Marri Chenna Reddy	Indian National Congress
1962	A. Ramaswamy	Indian National Congress
1967	A. Ramaswamy	Indian National Congress
1972	V. B. Thirumalaiah	Independent politician
1978	V. B. Thirumalaiah	Indian National Congress
1983	V. B. Thirumalaiah	Indian National Congress
1985	A. Chandrasekhar	Telugu Desam Party
1989	A. Chandrasekhar	Telugu Desam Party
1994	A. Chandrasekhar	Telugu Desam Party
1999	A. Chandrasekhar	Telugu Desam Party
2004	A. Chandrasekhar	Telangana Rashtra Samithi
2009	Gaddam Prasad Kumar	Indian National Congress
Telangana
2014	B. Sanjeeva Rao	Telangana Rashtra Samithi
2018	Methuku Anand	Telangana Rashtra Samithi
2023	Gaddam Prasad Kumar	Indian National Congress

== Election results ==
=== 2023 ===
2023 Telangana Legislative Assembly election: Vikarabad
Party	Candidate	Votes	%	±%
INC	Gaddam Prasad Kumar	86,885	49.85	▲
BRS	Methuku Anand	73,992	42.46	
BJP	Peddinti Naveen Kumar	7132	4.09	
NOTA	None of the Above	1,412	0.81	
Majority		12,893		
Turnout		1,74,282		
INC gain from BRS		Swing		

=== 2018 ===
2018 Telangana Legislative Assembly election: Vikarabad
Party	Candidate	Votes	%	±%
TRS	Methuku Anand	60,574	39.40	
INC	Gaddam Prasad Kumar	57,581	37.46	
AIFB	A. Chandrasekhar	24,282	15.80	
SFB	Pendyala Ananthaiah	3,247	2.11	
BJP	Raipally Sai Krishna	1,988	1.29	
NOTA	None of the Above	1,531	1.00	
Majority		2,993		
Turnout		1,53,722	74.18	
TRS hold		Swing		

=== 2014 ===
2014 Telangana Legislative Assembly election: Vikarabad
Party	Candidate	Votes	%	±%
TRS	B. Sanjeeva Rao	64,592	47.2%	
INC	Gaddam Prasad Kumar	54,520	39.8%	
Independent	Vadla Ramulu	6,513	4.8%	
BJP	Pushpa Leela Kondru	6,335	4.6%	
Majority		10,072		
Turnout		1,37,901	70.4%	
TRS gain from INC		Swing		

== See also ==
- List of constituencies of Telangana Legislative Assembly
- Vikarabad
