= Mandal (disambiguation) =

A mandal is a local government area, similar to a tehsil, in parts of India.

Mandal may also refer to:

== People ==
- Mandal (surname), including a list of people and fictional characters with the name

== Places ==
=== India ===
- Mandal tehsil, Bhilwara district, Rajasthan
- Mandal taluka, Ahmedabad district, Gujarat
  - Mandal, Gujarat
- Mandal, Uttarakhand

=== Mongolia ===
- Mandal, Selenge

=== Norway ===
- Mandal, Norway, a town within Lindesnes Municipality in Agder county
- Mandal Municipality, a former municipality in the old Vest-Agder county
- Mandal Airfield, a former military airfield in Agder county
- Mandalselva, (lit. 'Mandal River'), a river in Agder county

=== United States ===
- Mandahl, U.S. Virgin Islands, or Mandal

== Other uses ==
- Bharat Itihas Sanshodhak Mandal, commonly known as Mandal, a historical institute in India
- Mandal Commission, a 1979 commission in India on affirmative action
- Mandal, a lever or latch on a qanun musical instrument
- Mandal, a dialect of Nyimang language
- Mandal, Rigveda has 10 books or mandals, Mandala 1 to Mandala 10.

== See also ==
- Mandala (disambiguation)
- Mandol (disambiguation)
