= Chevella Lok Sabha constituency =

Lok Sabha Constituency in Telangana

Coordinates: 17.3°N 78.1°E

Chevella
- Lok Sabha constituency
- Chevella Lok Sabha constituency in Telangana

Constituency details
- Country: India
- Region: South India
- State: Telangana
- Assembly constituencies: Maheswaram; Rajendranagar; Serilingampally; Chevella; Pargi; Vikarabad; Tandur
- Established: 2008
- Total electors: 2,443,112
- Reservation: None

Member of Parliament
- 18th Lok Sabha
- Incumbent Konda Vishweshwar Reddy
- Party: BJP
- Elected year: 2024

Chevella Lok Sabha constituency or Chevella is one of the 17 Lok Sabha of Telangana State.(Lower House of the Parliament) constituencies in Telangana state in southern India.

Konda Vishweshwar Reddy of Bharatiya Janata Party is currently representing the constituency for the second time.

== History ==
The constituency came into existence in 2008, following the implementation of delimitation of parliamentary constituencies based on the recommendations of the Delimitation Commission of India constituted in 2002.

== Assembly segments ==
Chevella Lok Sabha constituency comprises the following Legislative Assembly segments:

No	Name	District	Member	Party	Leading (in 2024)
50	Maheswaram	Ranga Reddy	Sabitha Indra Reddy	BRS	BJP
51	Rajendranagar	Ranga Reddy	T. Prakash Goud	BRS	BJP
52	Serilingampally	Ranga Reddy	Arekapudi Gandhi	BRS	BJP
53	Chevella (SC)	Ranga Reddy	Kale Yadaiah	BRS	BJP
54	Pargi	Vikarabad	T. Ram Mohan Reddy	INC	BJP
55	Vikarabad (SC)	Vikarabad	Gaddam Prasad Kumar	INC	INC
56	Tandur	Vikarabad	B. Manohar Reddy	INC	BJP

== Members of Parliament ==
Year	Member	Party
Andhra Pradesh
2009	Sudini Jaipal Reddy	Indian National Congress
Telangana
2014	Konda Vishweshwar Reddy	Bharat Rashtra Samiti
2019	G. Ranjith Reddy	Bharat Rashtra Samiti
2024	Konda Vishweshwar Reddy	Bharatiya Janata Party

== Election results ==
=== 2024 ===
2024 Indian general election: Chevella
Party	Candidate	Votes	%	±%
BJP	Konda Vishweshwar Reddy	809,882	48.34	▲34.81
INC	G. Ranjith Reddy	636,985	38.02	▼1.48
BRS	Kasani Gnaneshwar Mudiraj	178,968	10.68	▼29.94
NOTA	None of the above	6,423	0.38	▼0.33
Majority		172,897	10.32	▲9.20
Turnout		1,675,354	56.40	▲3.15
BJP gain from BRS		Swing		

=== 2019 ===
2019 Indian general elections: Chevella
Party	Candidate	Votes	%	±%
TRS	G. Ranjith Reddy	528,148	40.62	▲7.56
INC	Konda Vishweshwar Reddy	513,831	39.50	▲11.99
BJP	B. Janardhan Reddy	201,960	15.53	New
NOTA	None of the above	9,244	0.71	▼0.05
Majority		14,317	1.12	▼4.43
Turnout		1,300,998	53.25	▼7.26
TRS hold		Swing	▲7.56	

=== General election, 2014 ===
2014 Indian general elections: Chevella
Party	Candidate	Votes	%	±%
TRS	Konda Vishweshwar Reddy	435,077	33.06	New
INC	Patlolla Kartik Reddy	362,054	27.51	▼11.27
TDP	Tulla Veerender Goud	353,203	26.84	▼10.24
YSRCP	Konda Raghava Reddy	40,135	3.04	New
NOTA	None of the above	10,018	0.76	N/A
Majority		73,023	5.55	▲3.85
Turnout		1,322,312	60.51	▼0.53
TRS gain from INC		Swing	▲27.42	

=== General election, 2009 ===
2009 Indian general elections: Chevella
Party	Candidate	Votes	%	±%
INC	Jaipal Reddy	420,807	38.78	
TDP	A. P. Jithender Reddy	402,275	37.08	
BJP	Baddam Bal Reddy	112,701	10.39	
PPoI	Kumari Giri	37,076	3.42	
LSP	Dr. B. Raghuveer Reddy	35,660	3.28	
MANP	Kasani Gnaneshwar Mudiraj	19,996	1.84	
Majority		18,532	1.70	
Turnout		1,085,000	64.52	
INC win (new seat)				

== Trivia ==
- Jaipal Reddy, former Union Minister represented the constituency when it came into existence in 2008.
- The constituency includes suburb areas like Madhapur, Gachibowli, Kondapur, Miyapur.

== See also ==
- Rangareddy district
- List of constituencies of the Lok Sabha
