= List of villages in Nizamabad district =

Nizamabad district is located in the Indian state of Telangana. The district has 922 villages which are administered in 36 mandals.

Nizamabad district in Telangana

== Mandal wise villages ==
The following are the list of villages in their respective mandals as per 2011 census of India.

- Census India 2011 (sub districts)
- Nizamabad district and Sub-district (Mandals)

== A ==
#	Armoor mandal
1	Aluar(ఆలూర్)
2	Amdapur(అమ్దాపూర్)
3	Ankapur(అంకాపూర్)
4	Bardipur
5	Chepur(చేపూర్)
6	Degaon(దేగాం)
7	Fathehpur(ఫతేపూర్)
8	Gaggupalle(గగ్గుపల్లి)
9	Govindpet(గోవింద్ పేట్)
10	Issapalle(ఇస్సాపల్లీ)
11	Khanapur(ఖానాపూర్)
12	Komanpalle(కొమ్మనుపల్లీ)
13	Kotha Armur(కోతార్మూర్)
14	Macherla (మాచెర్ల)
15	Magdi
16	Mamidipalle
17	Manthani
18	Merdepalle
19	Perkit
20	Pipri
21	Rampur
22	Surbiriyal

== B ==
#	Balkonda mandal !! Banswada mandal !! Bheemgal mandal !! Bhiknur mandal !! Bichkunda mandal !! Birkur mandal !! Bodhan mandal						
1	Balkonda	Banswada	Babanagar	Anthampalle	Anjani	Ankole	Achampalle (Rural)
2	Bodepalle	Borlam	Babapur	Baswapur	Bandaranjal	Bairapur	Amadapur
3	Bussapur	Budmi	Bachanpalle	Bhagirathipalle	Begampur	Barangedgi	Bardipur
4	Chakeriyal	Chinna Nagaram	Bejjora	Bhiknoor	Bichkunda	Baswaipalle	Bhandarpalle
5	Chittapur	Chinna Rampur Thanda	Bheemgal	Gurjakunta	Burugpalle	Birkoor	Bhavanipet
6	Doodgaon	Desaipet	Changal	Isannapalle	Chinna Devada	Bommandevpalle	Bhiknalli
7	Jalalpur	Hanmajipet	Devakkapet	Jangampalle	Chinna Dhadgi	Boppaspalle	Bodhan (Rural)
8	Kisannagar	Ibrahimpet	Devan Palle	Kachapur	Chinna Takkadpalle	Chincholi	Erajpalle
9	Kodecherla	Khadlapur	Gangarai	Kancherla	Dowlatapur	Chinna Annaram	Fathepur
10	Kothapalle	Kollur	Gongappul	Laxmidevipalle	Fathlapur	Durki	Hangarga
11	Mendora	Konapur	Jagriyal	Mallupalle	Gopanpalle	Hajipur	Hunsa
12	Mukpal	Pocharam	Karepalle	Peddamallareddy	Gundekalloor	Kamshetpalle	Jadijamalpur
13	Nagampet	Sangojipet	Kupkal	Peddapalle	Gundenamali	Kishtapur	Kaldurthi
14	Nagapur	Someshwar	Lingapurchouth	Pondurthi	Hasgul	Mallapur	Khajapur
15	Nallur	Tadkole	Mendhora	Rajampet	Jagannathapalle	Mirzapur	Khandgaon
16	Renjarla	Tirmalapur	Muchkur	Rameshwarpalle	Kandarpalle	Mylaram	Komanpalle
17	Savel		Pallikonda	Ryegatlapalle	Khatgaon	Nachpalle	Kopperga
18	Soanpet		Pedda Bheemgal	Talmadla	Kheslabad	Namli	Lakmapur
19	Bashirabad		Pipri	Tippapur	Manyapur	Nasurullabad	Langadapur
20	Velgatur		Puranipet		Meka	Pedda Damarancha	Mandharna
21	Vempalle		Rahathnagar		Rajulla (రాజుల్లా)		Mavandi (Kalan)
22	Venchariyal		Salampur				Mavandi (Khurd)
23	Pochampad(Sri Ram Sagar Project)		Sikandrapur				Minarpalle
24			Thallapalle				Naganpalle
25							Narsapur
26							Ootpalle
27							Pegadpalle
28							Penta Kalan
29							Penta Khurd
30							Rampur
31							Salampad
32							Saloora
33							Sangam
34							Siddapur
35							Taggelli

36 || || || || || || || Bhulakshmi camp

== D ==
# Doosgam	Domakonda		
6	Gouraram	Doosgaon	Issanagar
7	Govindpalle	Gannaram	Jangaon
8	Kesaram	Ghanpur	Konapur
9	Lolam	Indalwai	Lingupalle
10	Mailaram	Kamalapur	Malkapur
11	Nallavalle	Koratpalle	Mohammadapur
12	Ramadugu	Mallapur	Mutyampet
13	Sirnapally	Mentrajpalle	Ramchandrapur
14	Vengalpad	Mittapalle	Ramreddipalle
15		Nadepally	Sangameshwar
16		Rampur	Siribibipet
17		Suddepally	Sitarampalle
18		Suddulam	Sitarampur
19		Thriambakpeta	Tujalpur
20		yellareddypally	Yadaram

21 ansanpally yanampally

== G ==
#	Gandhari mandal
1	Boppajiwadi
2	Brahmanpalle
3	Burgul
4	Chedmal
5	Chinnapur
6	Durgam
7	Gandhari
8	Gandivet
9	Gujjul
10	Gurjal
11	Juvvadi
12	Karakwadi
13	Katewadi
14	Madholi
15	Mathsangam
16	Medpalle
17	Naglur
18	Narsapur (Mudholi)
19	Neral
20	Pedda Gouraram
21	Petasangam
22	Pothangal (Kalan)
23	Pothangal (Khurd)
24	Ramalakshmanpalle
25	Sarvapur
26	Sithaipalle
27	Somaram
28	Thimmapuram
29	Tipparam
30	Utnur
32	Vajjepalle (Khurd)
32	Vandrikal
33	Venkatapur
34	Yacharam

== J ==
#	Jakranpalle mandal	Jukkal mandal
1	Argul	Babulgaon
2	Brahmanpalle	Bangarpalle
3	Chintalur	Baswapur
4	Jakranpalle	Bijjalwadi
5	Kaligote	Chandegaon
6	Kolipaka	Chinna Edgi
7	Lakshmapur	Chinna Ghulla
8	Madhapur	Dongaon
9	Manoharabad	Dostpalle
10	Munipalle	Gundoor
11	Narayanpet	Hangarga
12	Padkal	Jukkal
13	Poppalpalle	Kanthali
14	Sikindrapur	Kathalwadi
15	Thorlikonda	Khandeballoor
16	Keshpally	Khemraja Kallali
17	Chandmiya Bagh	Kowlas
18	Viveknagar Thanda	Ladegaon
19		Lingampalle
20		Longaon
21		Madhapur
22		Mailar
23		Mohammadabad
24		Nagalgaon
25		Padampalle
26		Pedda Edgi
27		Pedda Ghulla
28		Pocharam
29		Savargaon
30		Shivapur
31		Siddapur
32		Sopur
33		Wajrakhandi

== K ==
#	Kamareddy mandal	Kammarpally mandal	Kotgiri mandal
1	Adloor	Basheerabad	Adkas Palle
2	Chinna Mallareddy	Choutupalle	Bareedpur
3	Devanpalle	Dammannapet	Baswapur
4	Elichpur	Dammanpet (Ameernagar)	Chikatpalle
5	Gargul	Gudilingapur	Domaledgi
6	Gudem	Hasakothur	Eklaspur
7	Isrojiwadi	Inayat Nagar	Ethonda
8	Kothalpalle	Kammar Palle	Gannavaram
9	Kyasampalle	Konapur	Hangerga
10	Lingapur (Rural)	Konasamandar	Hegdoli
11	Lingayapalle	Manal	Jallapalle
12	Narasannapalle	Nagapur	Kallur
13	Patharajampet	Narsapur	Karegoan
14	Raghavapur	Uploor	Kodcherla
15	Rameswarpalle		Kollur
16	Sarampalle		Kotgiri
17	Shabdipur		Kothapalle
18	Tekriyal		Lingampalle
19	Thimmakkapalle		Lingapur
20	Thimmakkapalle		Mirzapur
21	Uggrawai		Pothangal
22			Raikur
23			Ramanpalle
24			Rampur
25			Siddapur
26			Sompur
27			Sudlam
28			Sunkini
29			Takli
30			Tirmalapur
31			Vallabhapur
32			Yadgarpur

== L ==
#	Lingampet mandal
1	Banapur
2	Bayampalle
3	Bhavanipet
4	Bonal
5	Jaldipalle
6	Kanchmahal
7	Kannapur
8	Kondapur
9	Korpole
10	Lingampalle (Khurd)
11	Lingampet
12	Mangaram
13	Mombajipet
14	Motha
15	Nagaram
16	Nallamadugu
17	Perumalla
18	Polkampet
19	Pothaipalle
20	Rampur
21	Shatpalle
22	Shetpalle
23	Yellaram

== M ==
#	Machareddy mandal	Madnur mandal	Makloor mandal	Mortad mandal
1	Akkapur	Antapur	Amrad(అమ్రాద్)	Battapur
2	Annaram	Awalgaon	Bonkanpalle	Dharmora
3	Antampalle	Chinna Eklara	Borgaon	Domchanda
4	Banda Rameshwarpalle	Chinna Shekkarga	Chikli(చిక్లి)	Donkal
5	Bhavanipet	Chinna Thadugur	Chinnapur(చిన్నాపూర్)	Donpal
6	Chukkapur	Dhannoor	Dharmora (ధర్మోర)	Gumeriyal
7	Devunipalle	Dhoti	Gottimukkala(గొట్టిముక్కల)	Mortad
8	Faridpet	Dongli	Gunjali(గుంజలి)	Palem
9	Ghanpur (M)	Elegaon	Gutpa(గుత్ప)	Ramannapet
10	Ghanpur (R)	Enbhura	Kalladi(కల్లెడి)	Shetpalle
11	Issaipet	Gojegaon	Lakhmapur(లఖ్మాపూర్)	Sunkat
12	Latchapet	Hassa Takli	Madanpalle(మదనపల్లి)	Tadla Rampur
13	Machareddy	Keroor	Makloor(మాక్లూర్)	Tadpakal
14	Maddikunta	Kharag	Madapur(మాదాపూర్)	Thimmapur+
15	Palwancha	Kotchira	Mamidipalle(ఆడవి మామిడిపల్లి)	Thurat
16	Potaram	Kurla	Manik Bhandar	Vaddiyat
17	Rajkhanpet	Lachan	Metpalle(మేటు)	Yergatla
18	Reddipet	Lachmapur	Mullangi(ముల్లంగి) (Binala)	
19	Singraipalle	Limboor	Ramchandrapally(రాంచంద్రాపల్లి)	
20	Somarampet	Madnur	Singampalle(సింగంపల్లె)	
21	Tadkapalle	Mahdan Hipperga	Vaddatipalle(వద్దటిపల్లె)	
22	Wadi	Mainur	Vallabhapur(వల్లహాపూర్)	
23	Yellampet	Mallapur	Venkatapur(వెంకటాపూర్)	
24	Yellapgonda	Marepalle	Gangaramandha(గంగరమంద)	
25		Mogha		
26		Pedda Eklara		
27		Pedda Shekkarga		
28		Pedda Takli		
29		Pedda Thadgur		
30		Rachoor		
31		Rusegaon		
32		Salabathpur		
33		Shekhapur		
34		Sirpur		
35		Somoor		
36		Sonala		
37		Sultanpet		
38		Thadi Hipperga		

== N ==
#	Nagareddypet mandal	Nandipet mandal	Navipet mandal	Nizamabad mandal	Nizamsagar mandal
1	Achaipalle	Ailapur	Abbapur (B)	Amrabad	Achampet
2	Akkampalle	Annaram	Abbapur (M)	Badsi	Arepalle
3	Atmakur	Badgoni	Abhangapatnam	Bhairapur	Banjepalle
4	Bollaram	Bazarkothur	Alzapur	Borgaon (P)	Boorgul
5	Chinur	C.H.Kondoor	Ananthagiri	Chinnapur	Brahmanpalle
6	Dharmareddy	Chimrajpalle	Binola	Dharmaram	Galipur
7	Golilingal	Dattapur	Dharmaram	Gopanpalle	Gorgal
8	Jalalpur	Donkeshwar	Dharyapur	Gundaram	Gunkul
9	Kannareddy	Gadepalle	Fathenagar	Jalalpur	Hasanpalle
10	Lingampalle (Kalan)	Gangasamundar	Jannipalle	Kalpole	Jakkapur
11	Malthummeda	Joorpur	Kamalapur	Kalur	Komalancha
12	Masanpalle	Kamtam	Khadirabad	Kanjar	Magi
13	Matur	Khudavandapur	Kosli	Keshapur	Mallur
14	Nagireddypet	Komatpalle	Lingapur	Khanapur	Mangloor
15	Pocharam	Lakkampalle	Maddepalle	Kondur	Maqdumpur
16	Raghavapalle	Mallaram	Mahantham	Lingithanda	Narsingraopalle
17	Ramakkapalle	Marampalle	Mittapur	Laxmapur	Narva
18	Tandur	Mayapur	Mokanpalle	Malkapur	Sanivarpet
19	Vadalparthi	Nandipet	Nagepur	Malkapur (J)	Shairkhanpalle
20	Venkampalle	Narkodh	Naleshwar	Mallaram	Singitham
21	Yerraram	Nikalpur	Nandigaon	Manchippa	Telagapoor
22	Zapti Jankampalle	Noothpalle	Narayanpur	Mubaraknagar	Tunkepalle
23		Shahpur	Navipet	Mudakpalle	Turkapalle
24		Siddapur	Nizampur	Mugpal	Velugunur
25		Sirpur	Pothangal	Mullangi	Vengalampalle
26		Talveda	Rampur	Muthakunta	Waddepalle
27		Tondakur	Shaikhapur	Nyalkal	
28		Ummeda	Shiranpalle	Palda	
29		Vannel(Khurd)	Tungini	Pangra	
30		Velmal	Yamcha	Sarangapur	
31			Lakshmi Kisan Farm	Sirpur	
32				Thana Khurd	
33				Tirmanpalle	
34				Yellamkunta	

== P ==
#	Pitlam mandal
1	Allapur
2	Bandapalle
3	Bollakpalle
4	Brahmanpalle
5	Burnapur
6	Chillangi
7	Chinna Gouraram
8	Chinna Kodapgal
9	Dharmaram
10	Godamgaon
11	Hasnapur
12	Karegaon
13	Katepalle
14	Khambapur
15	Kishtapur
16	Koranpalle
17	Kurthi
18	Maddelchervu
19	Mardanda
20	Nagampalle
21	Paredpalle
22	Pedda Annaram
23	Pedda Rampur
24	Pitlam
25	Pothreddypalle
26	Siddapur
27	Thimmanagar

== R ==
#	Renjal mandal
1	Bhagepalle
2	Boregaon
3	Dupalle
4	Kalyapur
5	Kandakurthi
6	Kunepalle
7	Neela
8	Ranjal
9	Satapur
10	Tadbiloli

== S ==
#	Sadasivanagar mandal	Sirkonda mandal
1	Adloor Yellareddy	Chimanpalle
2	Amarlabanda	Chinna Walgot
3	Bhoompalle	Gadkole
4	Dhaggi	thumpalle
5	Dharmaraopet	Hussainnagar
6	Gidda	Kondapur
7	Gollapalle	Kondur
8	Issannapalle	Kotalapalle
9	Jangaon	Mailaram
10	Kannapur	Musheernagar
11	Kolwaral	Nyavandi
12	Kuprial	Pakhal
13	Lingampalle	Pandimadugu
14	Markhal	Pedda Walgot
15	Modegaon	Pothnur
16	Moshampur	Ramadugu
17	Mudhojiwadi	Ravutla
18	Padmajiwadi	Rekulapalle
19	Posanipet	Sirkonda
20	Radhaipalle	Thatpalle
21	Ramareddy	
22	Rangampet	
23	Sadasivanagar	
24	Thimmajiwadi	
25	Tirmanpalle	
26	Tukkojiwadi	
27	Uppalwai	

== T ==
#	Tadwai mandal
1	Argonda
2	Brahamajiwadi
3	Brahmanpalle
4	Chandapur
5	Chityal
6	Devai Palle
7	Endriyal
8	Gundaram
9	Kankal
10	Karadpalle
11	Kelojiwadi
12	Kondapur
13	Krishnajiwadi
14	Nandiwada
15	Pedda Demi
16	Sangojiwadi
17	Santaipet
18	Siddapur
19	Somaram
20	Tadwai
21	Venkayalapalle
22	Yerrapahad

== V ==
#	Varni mandal	Velpur mandal
1	Akbar Nagar	Aklur
2	Ambam	Ameenapur
3	Boppapur	Anksapur
4	Chandur	Janakampeta
5	Chintakunta	Komanpalle
6	Ghanpur	Kothapalle
7	Govoor	Kuknur
8	Humnapur	Lakhora
9	Jakore	Mothe
10	Jalalpur	Narkhoda
11	Karegaon	Padgal
12	Khunipur	Pochampalle
13	Kondapur	Sahebpet
14	Laxmapur	Velpur
15	Mallaram	Venkatapur
16	Medpalle	Wadi
17	Mosra	
18	Pedmal	
19	Rajpet	
20	Rudrur	
21	Sayeedpur	
22	Shankaoora	
23	Siddapur	
24	Taglepalle	
25	Thimmapur	
26	Varni	

== Y ==
#	Yedapally mandal	Yellareddy mandal
1	Ambam	Advilingal
2	Brahammanpalle	Annasagar
3	Jaithapur	Bhiknoor
4	Jamlam	Brahmanpalle
5	Jankampet	Daval Malkapalle
6	Kurnapalle	Devanpalle
7	Mangalpahad	Gandimasanipet
8	Pocharam	Hajipur
9	Thanekalan	Jangamaipalle
10	Yedpalle	Jankampalle (Khurd)
11		Kottal
12		Laxmapur
13		Lingareddipet
14		Machapur
15		Mallaipalle
16		Mathmal
17		Misanpalle
18		Moulanakhed
19		Repallewada
20		Rudraram
21		Safdarpur
22		Sivapur
23		Somawarpet
24		Timmapur
25		Timmareddy
26		Vellutla
27		Venkatapur
28		Venkatapur (Agraharam)
29		Yellareddy
