= Limboor =

- village
- Location in Telangana, India Limboor (India)
- Coordinates: 18.4052246°N 77.717036°E
- Country: India
- State: Telangana
- District: Nizamabad

Government
  - Mandal: Madnur

Languages
  - Official: Telugu
- Time zone: UTC+5:30 (IST)
- PIN: 503309
- Telephone code: 91-8464
- Vehicle registration: AP 25
- Lok Sabha constituency: Zahirabad
- Vidhan Sabha constituency: Jukkal (SC)

Limboor or Limbur is a village in Madnur / Madnoor mandal in Nizamabad district in the state of Telangana in India.

== Geography ==
Limboor is bound on its side by Lendi river, is one of the important tributaries of the Manjira River. Godavari River has left and right tributaries, Manjira River is one of right side tributaries. It enters Telangana at Kandhakurthi in Nizamabad district.

== List of Assembly constituency ==
S No	District	Assembly Constituency Name	Extent of Assembly Constituencies
13	Nizamabad	Jukkal (SC)	Madnoor/ Madnur, Jukkal, Bichkunda, Pitlam and Nizamsagar Mandals.

== List of Parliament constituency ==
S No	Villages of Districts	Lok Sabha Constituency Name	Reserved for (SC/ST/None)	Assembly constituency segments
5	Nizamabad & Medak	Zahirabad		Jukkal (SC), Banswada, Yellareddy, Kamareddy, Narayankhed, Andole (SC) and Zahirabad
