= Nizamabad mandal =

- Mandal
- Location in Telangana, India Nizamabad mandal (India)
- Coordinates: 18.672°N 78.094°E
- Country: India
- State: Telangana
- District: Nizamabad
- Headquarters: Nizamabad

Population (2011)
  - Total: 412,500

Languages
  - Official: Telugu, Urdu
- Time zone: UTC+5:30 (IST)
- PIN: 503001, 02, 03
- Vehicle registration: TS 16
- Website: telangana.gov.in

Nizamabad mandal is one of the 27 mandals within Nizamabad District in the Indian state of Telangana. It is located in the revenue division of Nizamabad, while the headquarters are located in the city of the same name. The mandal is bordered by those of Mosra, Chandur, Yedpalle, Navipet, Makloor, Gandhari, and Dichpalle.

On 11 October 2016, the government of Telangana reorganized the districts and mandals of the state. During reorganisation, the Nizamabad mandal was divided into four mandals: Nizamabad North, Nizamabad South, Nizamabad Rural, and Mugpal.

== Demographics ==
The 2011 Census of India recorded the mandal as having a population of 412,500, consisting of 204,700 males and 207,800 females (a sex ratio of 1,015 females per 1,000 males). 47,868 children were recorded as being between 0 and 6 years of age (24,331 males and 23,537 females). The average literacy rate stands at 73.81%, with 269,126 literates.

== Administration ==
Nizamabad comes under the administration of both the urban assembly constituency of Nizamabad and the rural assembly constituency of Nizamabad, which in turn represent the Lok Sabha constituency of Nizamabad in the state of Telangana.

== Towns and villages ==
The mandal has 36 settlements, as recorded in the 2011 Census of India, including 1 town and 35 villages. The city of Nizamabad is the local governing body within the mandal.

The settlements in the mandal are listed below:

1. Amrabad
2. Badsi
3. Borgaon
4. Chinnapur
5. Dharmaram
6. Gopanpalle
7. Gundaram
8. Jalalpur
9. Kalpole
10. Kalur
11. Kanjar
12. Keshapur
13. Khanapur
14. Kondur
15. Laxmapur
16. Lingithanda
17. Malkapur Thanda
18. Mallaram
19. Mubaraknagar
20. Muthakunta
21. Nizamabad (Local governing body)
22. Nyalkal
23. Palda
24. Pangra
25. Sarangapur
26. Seripur
27. Thalla Kothapet
28. Thana Khurd
29. Thirmanpalli
30. Yellamkunta
