= Battapoor =

Battapur
- Country: India
- State: Telangana
- District: Nizamabad district
- Mandal: Yergatla
- Postal Index Number: 503308
- Country Code-Area Code: +91-40
- ISO 3166 code: IN-TG
- Website: telangana.gov.in

Battapoor is a village in Telangana, India. It is located in yergatla mandal, Nizamabad district. The PIN is 503308. 90% of the population depends on agriculture. The main language is Telugu.

A 1792 book refers to the town of Shapoor as near Battapur.

== See also ==
- List of districts of India
