= Kandakurthi =

Village in Telangana, India

Kandakurthi is a village in Ranjal mandal of Nizamabad district in the Indian state of Telangana. As of 2011, the village had a total number of 929 houses and a population of 4,563, of whom 2,360 were male and 2,203 female. This is a place of religious attraction as it is the confluence point of River Godavari, Manjira River and Haridra River. The village is located at close proximity to the Maharashtra border and 30 kilometers from its district headquarters Nizamabad, Telangana.

== Notable people ==
The founder of RSS, Dr. Keshav Baliram Hedgewar, was a native of Kandakurthi.
