= Kandakuthi Triveni Sangamam =

Kandakurthi is a village in Renjal Mandal, Nizamabad District, Telangana, India.

Kandakurthi is called a Triveni Sangamam because the rivers Manjira and Haridra join Godavari here. There is a Shiva Temple on the banks of Godavari, and the period of its construction is yet to be studied.

The nearest city is Nizamabad.
