= Hasakothur =

- Village
- Location in Telangana, India Hasakothur (India)
- Coordinates: 18°48′1″N 78°30′56″E
- Country: India
- State: Telangana
- District: Nizamabad
- Mandal: Kammar pally

Government
  - Sarpanch: Revathi gangadhar

Population (2011)
  - Total: 4,574

Languages
  - Official: Telugu
- Time zone: UTC+5:30 (IST)
- PIN: 503 308
- Telephone code: 91-8463
- Vehicle registration: TS–16
- Literacy: 53.4%

Hasakothur (renamed from MuthyalaKothur in 1960s) is a village in the Kammarpally mandal in the Nizamabad district in the state of Telangana in India.

There are 1230 households and 4,574 population is there in village as per 2011 census, in that 2,215 are male and 2,359 are female.

== History ==
The area which village is located under Asmaka janapada (Assaka). of early Indian Vedic period, later it is under part of the Satavahana dynasty.

== Agriculture ==
Most of the people living in this village are farmers. The main crops cultivated are Rice, Turmeric (pasupu), Sweetcorn (mokka jonna), Pearl millet (sajja), millet (Jonna), Soya bean and Groundnut. The water resources for cultivation are bore wells, agricultural wells. This village has its own lake.
