= Ankapur =

- Village
- Location in Telangana, India Ankapur (India)
- Coordinates: 18°30′N 77°51′E
- Country: India
- State: Telangana
- District: Nizamabad

Area
  - Total: 8.92 km^{2} (3.44 sq mi)
- Elevation: 404 m (1,325 ft)

Population (2011)
  - Total: 5,689
  - Density: 638/km^{2} (1,650/sq mi)

Languages
  - Official: Telugu
- Time zone: UTC+5:30 (IST)
- PIN: 503224
- Vehicle registration: TS
- Website: ankapur.in

Ankapur is a village in Armoor mandal, Nizamabad district of the Indian state of Telangana. It comes under the Armur town which is like five kilometers away from this village. This village is considered one of the Model Villages in the country. It is recognized as a Model Village by the ICAR, ICRISAT and the International Rice Research Institute.

Srinivas Reddy Institute of Technology is located here. It is the first village in Nizamabad district to cultivate cut flowers in polyhouse. This village is 400 years old basically agriculture depends economy major communities are guradikapu,munnurukapu, mudhiraj,Goud ,yadav are major communities hereand is located on eastern side of the National Highway 16 connecting Nizamabad with Jagdalpur (CHG) also near to the National Highway (NH7) connecting Hyderabad and Nagpur. It lies at an elevation of 404 meters above the sea level. It receives an annual rainfall of about 1100 mm and experiences a subtropical climate.

== Land area ==
The total geographical area is 2205 acres. According to 2001 decennial census the total population of the village is 6066. There are 20 castes in the village.

== Commodities ==
The farmers grow bajra and sorghum for seed production, followed by maize and turmeric.

== Recognition ==
Ankapur is recognized as a model village by the International Rice Research Institute, Manila, Philippines for outstanding achievements in the field of agricultural development. Besides cultivating commercial crops, and vegetables on a large scale, the local farming communities have been raising various crops for seeds, instead of cereals and traditional crops of food grains. The Peasant Association of the village coordinates, organizes and controls various agricultural development programmes. The village also boasts of modern amenities for the inhabitants and is also taking up agriculture marketing by themselves.

== Chicken curry ==
Ankapur Chicken is popular fiery chicken curry that is considered one of the signature recipes of Telangana.

The dish was popularized by a small hotels in Ankapur. It grew in popularity with the local people for its fiery taste and unique blend. It was also part of the food served to showcase Telangana cuisine in World Telugu Conference held in 2017. It became popular in Andhra Pradesh as well. It has become popular in UAE and USA. It is recognized as brand cuisine with an International Trademark by Popular Telugu News Channel, TV9.

== See also ==
- List of villages in Nizamabad district
