= Talveda =

- Village
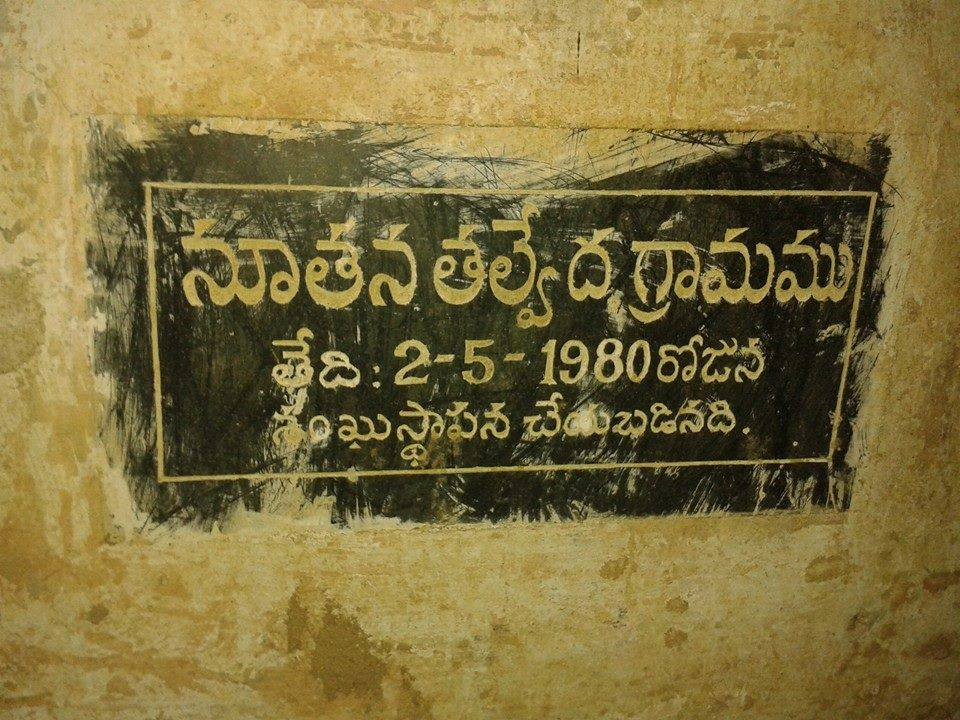
- Talveda village foundation stone
- Country: India
- State: Telangana
- District: Nizamabad

Languages
  - Official: Telugu
- Time zone: UTC+5:30 (IST)
- PIN: 503212
- Vehicle registration: TS-16
- Lok Sabha constituency: Nizamabad (Lok Sabha constituency)

Talveda is a village in Nizamabad district of the Indian state of Telangana. It is located in Nandipet mandal of the district. Per the 2011 Population Census, the Talveda population was 3,513. 1,653 were male, 1,860 were female. The total number of houses was 878. The population proportion is 55% male and 45% female. Talveda has an average literacy rate of 68%, higher than the Mandal average of 58%.

Talveda is one among those villages in Nandipet Mandal that were affected by the construction of the Pochampad Dam (Sri Ram Sagar Project). The government of Andhra Pradesh wanted to relocate Talveda at the borders of Nizamabad and Adilabad districts after the village was submerged under water of Pochampad Dam. The people of Talveda didn't want to move that far away and constructed the same village only one kilometer away from the old Talveda Village.

== History ==
The history of Talveda dates back to the era of Lord Sri Ramachandra. Especially to the incident where Lord Ram kills Vaali, king of Kishkinda and brother of Sugriva.

Lord Ramachandra promises Sugriva to kill Vali and make him the king, but Sugriva does not fully trust Lord Rama Chandra's prowess and tells his hesitation with his closed assembly such as Jāmbavān and Hanumān ji.

Then Lord Ramachandra prepares to prove his powers and asks how he can do that to the assembly.

Then Jāmbavān says, prabhu Ramachandra, Vāli has chased (cut) 3 huge Tala trees with just 3 arrows. It will give us a great confidence if you can do the same.

Then lord Ramachandra asks them to show the place of Tala trees, when taken to the place the Lord chases 7 Tala trees with one arrow.

Tala = Tala tree Veda = Cutting or clipping or braking

Hence, Talveda.

We had Ramabhadra's lotus feet there, hence from ancient time, bhajans and spiritual activities continues there even now.

Observance of religious practices is visible among non-devotees and youth. Many people observe various traditions, such as the Lord Ayyappa Mala, Hanuman Mala, and Devi Mala, and participate in spiritual programs.

HG Gaurachadra Das prabhu who hails from Dharpally, started preaching the Hare Krishna (ISKCON) Movement in the village for many years and influenced many devotees to turn to Krishna Consciousness. Ratha Yatra happens there in an ecstatic way led by HG Gaurachandra Prabhu.

The village's religious practices are influenced by Sant Tukaram Maharaj and the Pandharpur temple in Maharashtra. Abhangs and bhajans are performed regularly in local temples. A group of young boys formed a bhajan group, learning to play musical instruments and encouraging participation in devotional music in several districts. The group is known as Talveda Bhajan Mandali.

The village has numerous temples throughout the village.

== Culture ==
It has one of the best cricket teams in the Mandal, which often falls in the top 5 teams, and most of the time it remains at first or second position. It was also champion of Volleyball tournaments in Mandal.

Most of the inhabitants are taking up to devotional path following ISKCON and becoming devotees of Lord Krishna. There are large number of people who follow Shirdi Saibaba and it has a big Saibaba temple. Villagers usually go to annual Vrindavan Dham. They also make yatras to holy places such as Jagannath Puri, Pandharpur, Tirupati and many more.

Every year the villagers celebrate Katharina on the day of Sri Ramanavami festival and also offer Anna prasadam by the village committee. Many things are governed by this Village Committee.

The village is rich in culture, producing crops and being an example to many villages nearby. Many of the youths come forward to help in blood donation camps and relief activities in natural distress.

== Gallery ==
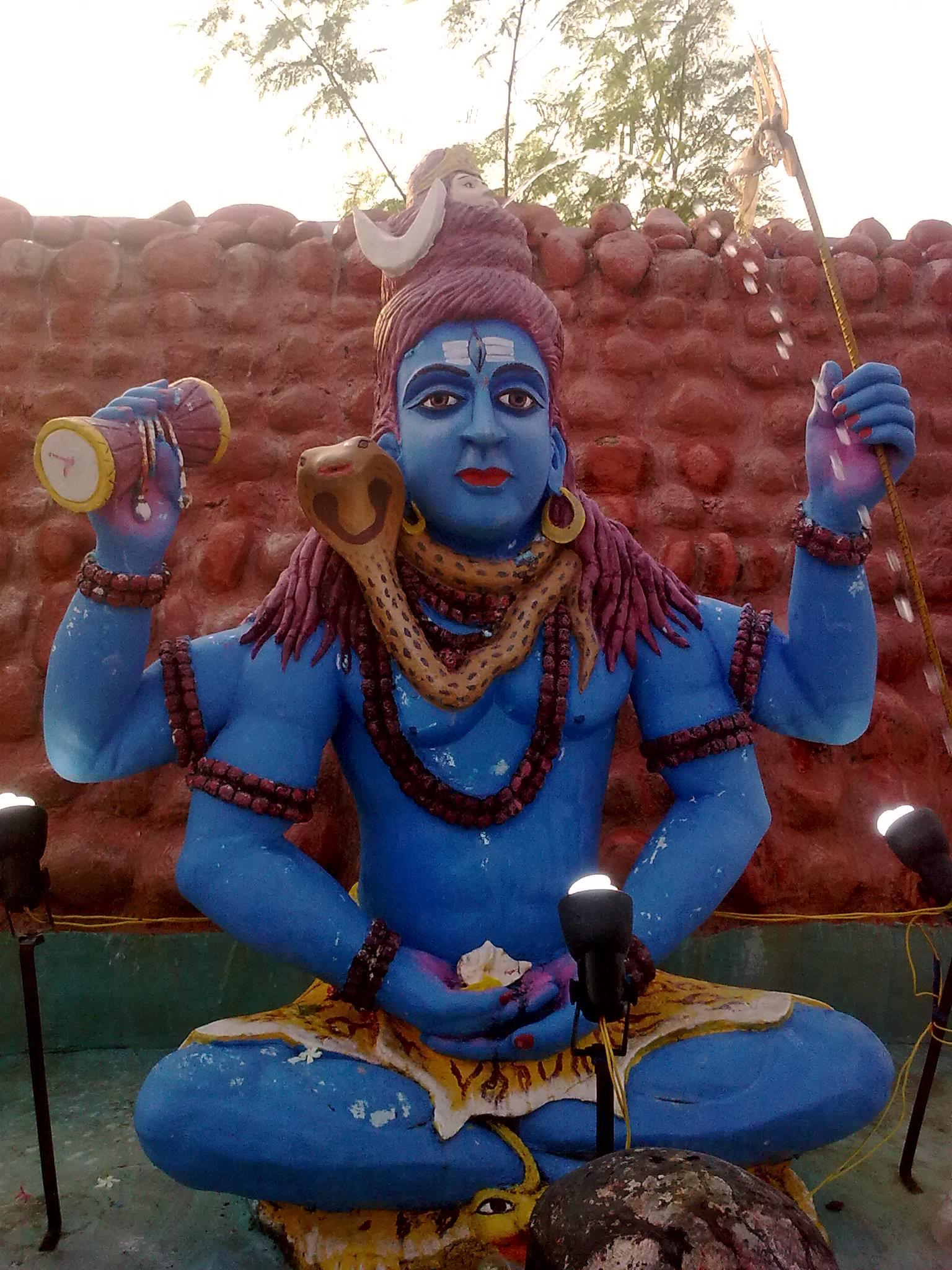
Lord shiva

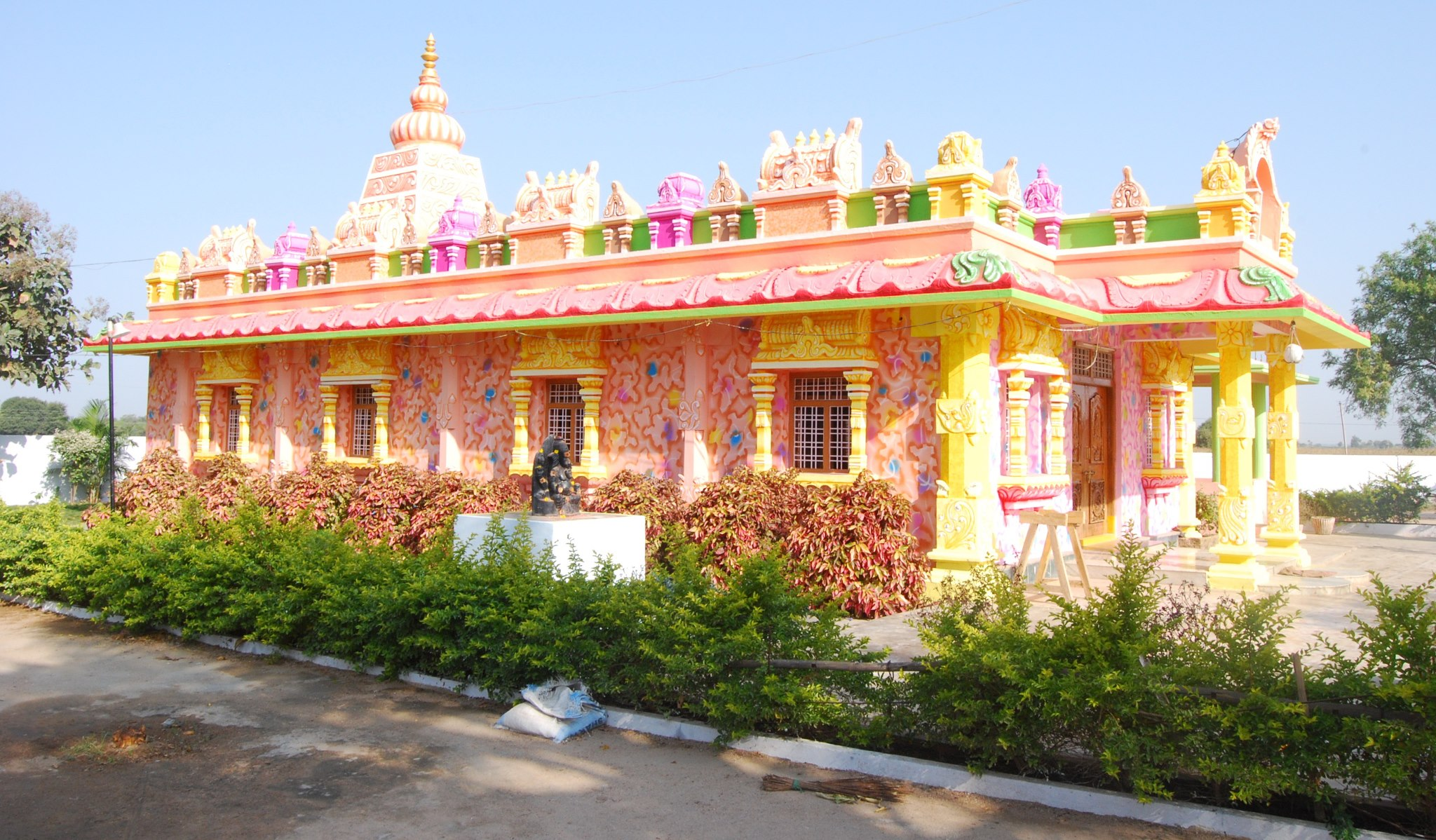
Temple
