= Erajpally =

- Village
- Country: India
- State: Andhra Pradesh
- District: Nizamabad

Population (2010)
  - Total: 5,000

Languages
  - Official: Telugu
- Time zone: UTC+5:30 (IST)
- PIN: 503180
- Telephone code: 08467-27----
- Vehicle registration: AP 25, may be TG 25
- Nearest city: Bodhan, Nizamabad, Hyderabad
- Sex ratio: 1000:1050 ♂/♀
- Literacy: 72%
- Lok Sabha constituency: Nizamabad
- Vidhan Sabha constituency: Bodhan

Erajpally is a village in the Nizamabad district of the state of Telangana, India.
