= Palem, Nizamabad district =

Palem is a village in Morthad mandal belongs to Nizamabad district in the Telangana state. It is located 50 km towards east from district headquarters Nizamabad. 4 km from Morthad. The main occupation of the people in the village is agriculture, whereas they grow many crops like paddy, groundnuts, turmeric, maize, soybean etc.. Palem Pin code is 503225 and postal head office is Morthad. There is a bank named State Bank of INDIA with the branch code as 020738 and the IFSC Code as SBIN0020738. This place is in the border of the Nizamabad District and Karimnagar District. Karimnagar District Metpalli is east towards this place. Telugu is the local language here. Total population of Palem is 3410. There are 1,680 males and 1,730 females living in 774 Houses. Total area of Palem is 1860 hectares. ZPHS Palem(Government School) won the best school of the state award for the year 2015 from Telangana Government - CM K. Chandrashekar Rao.

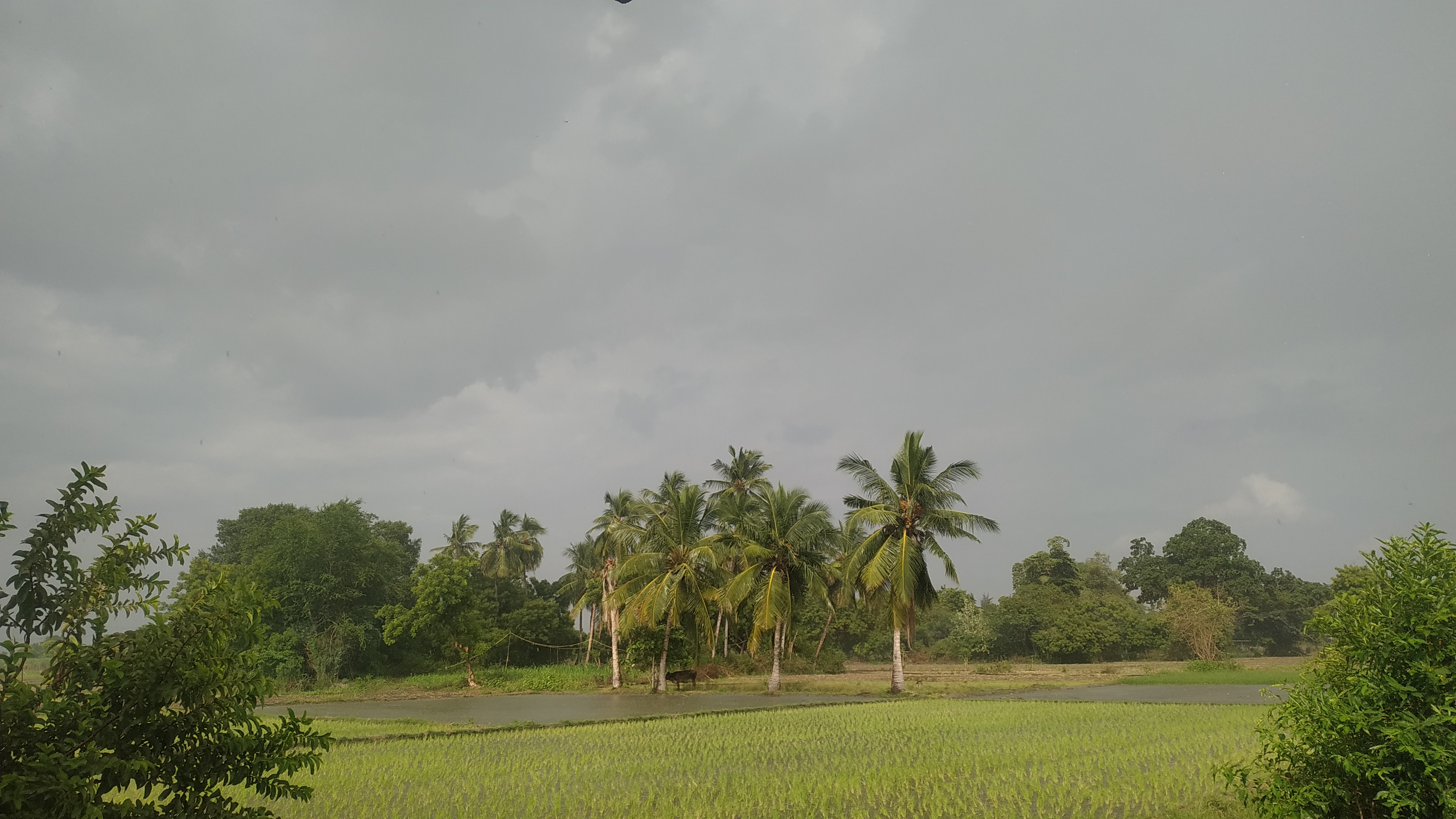
Farming is main source of income in Village

The village is ruled by the sarpanch whose tenure is for five years. The Sarpanch of Palem for 2020-2025 is Enugu Santhosh Reddy and Upa-Sarpanch is Paligiri Ravi, who acts as the deputy of sarpanch. Dongari Charan Raju is the person who look after the village development.
