= Chikkadpally, Nizamabad district =

Village in Telangana, India

Chikkadpally is a village in the Rudrur mandal, Nizamabad district, Telangana, India, located near to Rudrur. Chikkapally is one of the main villages in the Nizamabad district, with a population of 1500.

== Transport ==
The TSRTC runs the buses from Nizamabad to Rudur.
