= Thimmanagar =

Coordinates: 18.2122908°N 77.805197°E

- village
- Interactive map of Thimmanagar
- Country: India
- State: Telangana

Languages
  - Official: Telugu
- Time zone: UTC+5:30 (IST)

Thimmanagar is a village that comes under Pitlam mandal in the Nizamabad District of Telangana. It is 75 km away from Nizamabad and 150 km away from Hyderabad. It is just 3 km away from Pitlam.

The people of this village are mainly dependent on agriculture, but some families are succeeding in business. Paddy and sugar cane are the major crops cultivated, and the village has a population of around 3000. The Veer Hanuman temple is Thimmanagar's most visited place. The nearest visiting places are Nizamsagar reservoir and Nallavaag dam.
