= Varadachary =

Varadachary is a surname. Notable people with the surname include:

- G. S. Varadachary (1932–2022), Indian film critic
- T. R. Varadachary, Indian banker
