= Gadkole =

- Village
- Country: India
- State: Telangana
- District: Nizamabad district

Languages
  - Official: Telugu
- Time zone: UTC+5:30 (IST)
- Vehicle registration: TS

Gadkole is a village located in Nizamabad district of Telangana state, India. It is approximately 126.9 km from Hyderabad, the capital city of Telangana. Gadkole is located approximately 38.2 km from its district headquarters Nizamabad.
