= National Highway 161BB (India) =

National highway in India

National Highway 161BB
- Map of National Highway 161BB in red

Route information
- Auxiliary route of NH 61
- Length: 71.6 km (44.5 mi)

Major junctions
- West end: Madnoor
- East end: Bodhan

Location
- Country: India
- States: Telangana

Highway system
- Roads in India; Expressways; National; State; Asian
← NH 161	→ NH 63

National Highway 161BB, commonly called NH 161BB is a national highway in India. It is a spur road of National Highway 61 through NH 161. NH-161BB traverses the state of Telangana in India.

== Route ==
Madnoor, Sonala, Thadi Hipperga, Limboor, Sirpur, Pothangal, Kotagiri, Rudrur, Bodhan, Basar, Bhainsa.

== Junctions ==
NH 161 Terminal near Madnoor.
NH 63 Terminal near Bodhan.

== See also ==
- List of national highways in India
- List of national highways in India by state
