= Shankar Viman Mandapam =

Hindu Temple in Uttar Pradesh, India

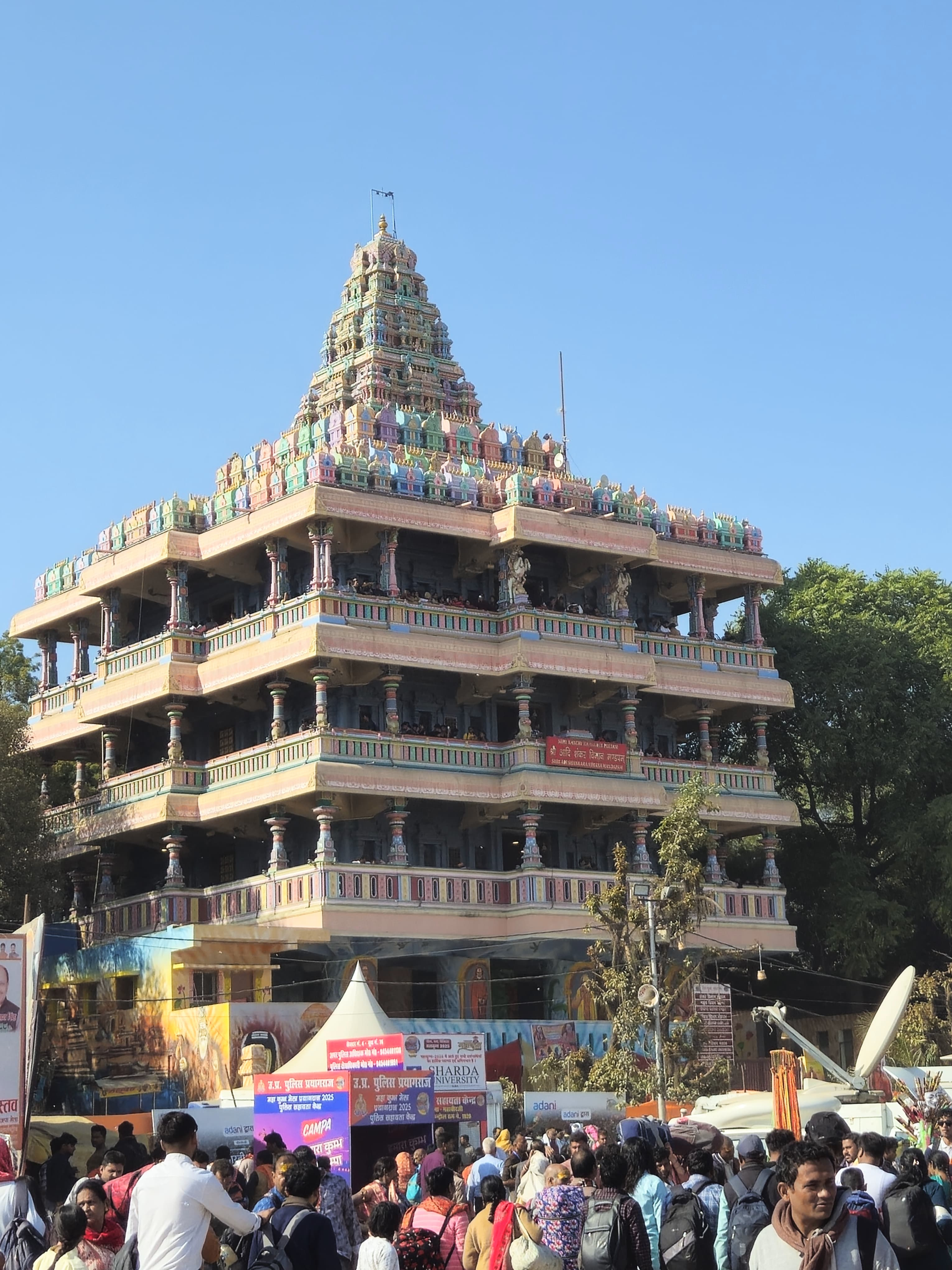

Religion
- Affiliation: Hinduism
- Deity: Shiva

Location
- Location: Prayagraj
- State: Uttar Pradesh
- Country: India

Architecture
- Type: Hindu architecture
- Elevation: 39.6 m (130 ft)

Shankar Viman Mandapam is a Hindu temple in Prayagraj, Uttar Pradesh, India and is dedicated to the Hindu God Shiva. Located north of the famous Triveni Sangam on the right banks of river Ganga, this four story temple is built in memory of Adi Shankaracharya. Architecture style is South Indian Vimana style.
