= Bade Hanuman Mandir =

Hanuman Mandir, Prayagraj
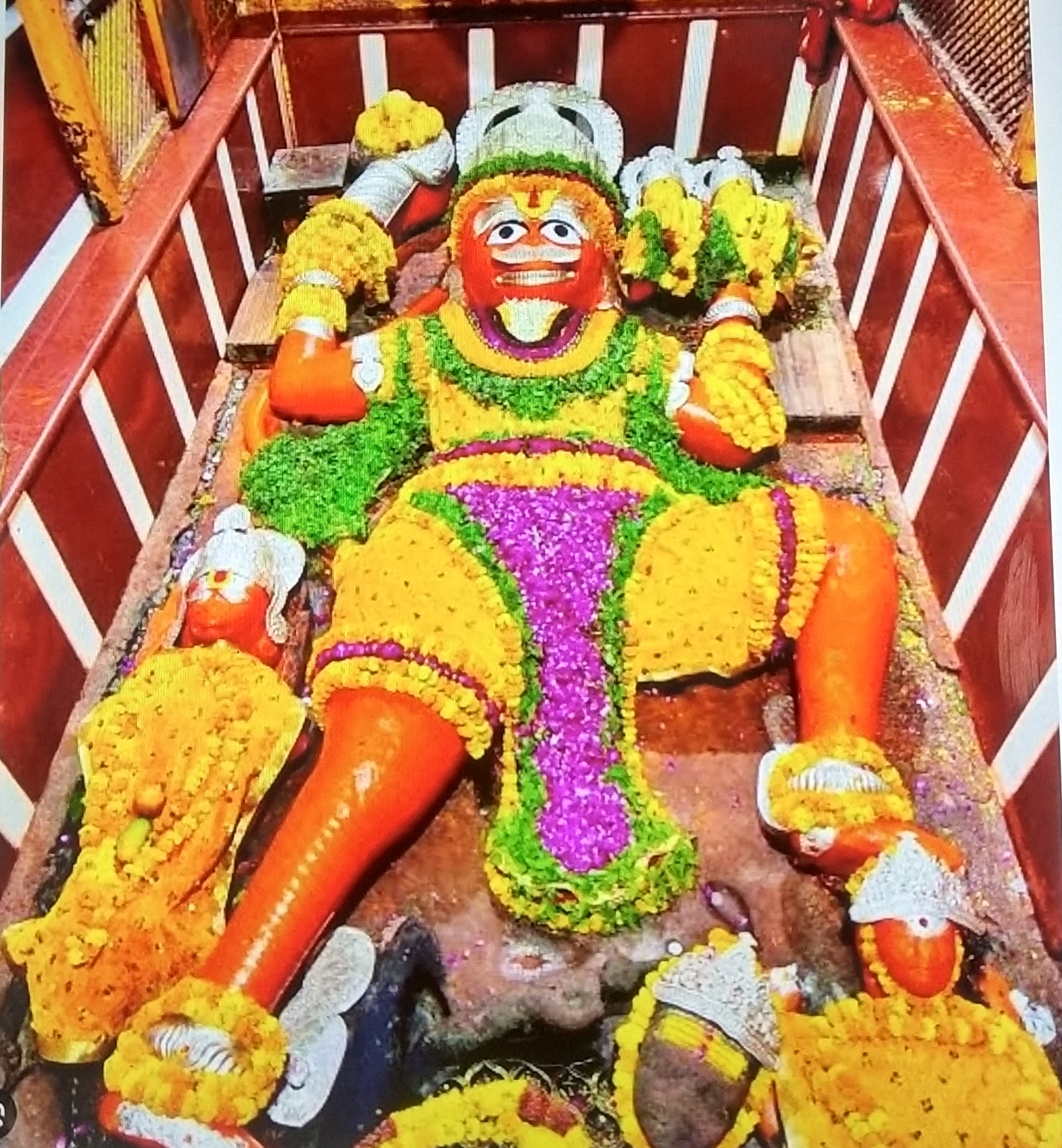
- Reclining idol of Lord Hanuman

Religion
- Affiliation: Hinduism
- Deity: Hanuman
- Festivals: Hanuman Jayanti, Ram Navami, Narak Chaturdashi

Location
- Location: Prayagraj, Uttar Pradesh, India

Architecture
- Type: Hindu temple
- Creator: Baba Balagiri Ji Maharaj (Installation of the idol)
- Established: Approximately 700 years ago

Website
- Official Website

Bade Hanuman Mandir, also known as Lete Hanuman Ji Mandir, is a renowned Hindu temple situated near the Triveni Sangam in Prayagraj, Uttar Pradesh, India. The temple is notable for its unique reclining idol of Hanuman, which becomes partially submerged during the monsoon season. This feature, along with its historical and cultural significance, attracts millions of devotees annually, especially during the Kumbh Mela.

== Location and accessibility ==
The temple is located approximately 1 km from the Triveni Sangam and 7 km from the Prayagraj Railway Station. It is situated near the Allahabad Fort and is easily accessible by road, making it a prominent pilgrimage destination.

== Historical significance ==
The temple's origins date back approximately 700 years. According to legend, a wealthy but childless businessman from Kannauj commissioned an idol of Hanuman from stones found in the Vindhyachal hills. After leaving the idol at Prayagraj during his pilgrimage to the Triveni Sangam, he was blessed with a son. The idol was later discovered by Baba Balagiri Ji Maharaj while preparing a dhuni (sacred site for worship) and was installed at its current location.

In 1582, Akbar was looking for a place to strengthen his hold on the rebellion going on in eastern India including Magadh, Awadh and Bengal. His experts attempted to relocate the temple, but Hanuman's statue would not move. Akbar eventually built the wall of his fort behind the temple and dedicated the land for Hanuman.

== Unique features ==
- Reclining Idol: The 20-foot-long reclining idol of Hanuman is the only one of its kind in the world.
- Seasonal Submersion: During the monsoon, the idol becomes partially submerged due to rising water levels, symbolizing Hanuman's humility and devotion.

== Temple timings and festivals ==
- Timings: The temple is open daily from 5:00 AM to 2:00 PM and from 5:00 PM to 8:00 PM. On Tuesdays and Saturdays, it remains open until 10:00 PM.
- Festivals: Major festivals celebrated here include Hanuman Jayanti, Ram Navami, and Narak Chaturdashi.

== Recent developments ==
The temple is undergoing extensive renovations and beautification in preparation for the 2025 Prayag Kumbh Mela. Initiatives include the expansion of the sanctum sanctorum, construction of a Parikrama Path, new shops, parking areas, and upgraded entrance gates.

== See also ==
- Hanuman
- Triveni Sangam
- Kumbh Mela
