= Donkal =

- village
- Location in Telangana, India
- Coordinates: 18.7894641°N 78.2892682°E
- Country: India
- State: Telangana
- District: Nizamabad

Government
  - Type: PANCHAYATHRAJ (SARPANCH)
  - Member of Parliament: Arvind Dharmapuri
  - Member of the Legislative Assembly: Vemula Prashanth Reddy
- Elevation (1391 ft): 424 m (1,391 ft)

Population (2011)
  - Total: 3,876

Languages
  - Official: Telugu
- Time zone: UTC+5:30 (IST)
- Postal code: 503311
- Vehicle registration: TS 16
- Literacy: 75%
- Website: www.donkal.com
- Sri Venkateshwara Swamy Temple

Donkal is a village in Mortad Mandal in Nizamabad District of Telangana State, India. It is located 44 km east of the District Headquarters and 6 km from Morthad. It is situated on the huge stone, at the entrance of the village. At the entrance of the village you can get blessings of Lord Balaji. it is covered with seven lakes by which the nature of this village looks beautiful.

Total population of Donkal village is 3,876 living in 929 Houses. There are 1,897 male inhabitants and 1,979 female. The total population of Mortad town is 11,965. The female population is 6,123 and the male population is 5,842. There are 2,693 dwelling houses. The total area of Donkal is about 1,246 hectares. The local language is Telugu.
