= Gummiryal =

- Village
- Interactive map of Gummiryal
- Coordinates: 18°56′46″N 78°30′58″E
- Country: India
- State: Telangana
- District: Nizamabad

Government
  - Sarpanch: S.P Raja Reddy(BJP)
  - MPTC: Bolli Shankar(BJP)

Population
  - Total: 2,326(2,011 Census)
- PIN Code: 503308

Gummiryal is a village in Yergatla Mandal, Nizamabad district, Telangana State, India. It is located on the south bank of the Godavari River. The village has many shrines, Including the paatimeedi Hanuman temple, The Sri krishna temple and Old hanuman temple on the bank of the Godavari, The oldest hanuman shrine in the center of the village and Nagendra swami temple is located in Nagendra nagar.

The village is a confluence of three districts( Nizamabad(ఇందూరు), Nirmal and Jagityal).

A daily RSS Shakha is conducted in this village. Mr. Kyatham Rajanna introduced the RSS to this village. Mr. Aleti Rajareddy, hailing from this village, served as an RSS Pracharak.
