= Donkeshwar =

- Village
- Location within Telangana Location within India
- Coordinates: 18.9412°N 78.1857°E
- Country: India
- State: Telangana
- District: Nizamabad
- Mandal: Donkeshwar

Population (2001)
  - Total: 4,000
- Time zone: UTC+05:30 (IST)
- Pincode: 503212

Donkeshwar is a village and Mandal in Nizamabad district in the Indian state of Telangana.

== Demographics ==
As of 2011 India census, Donkeshwar had a population of 3732 in 961 households. Males constitute 47.85% of the population and females 52.15%. Donkeshwar has an average literacy rate of 60.21%, lower than the national average of 74%: male literacy is 57.7%, and female literacy is 42.2%. In Donkeshwar, 9.35% of the population is under 6 years of age.
