= Sadasivanagar =

Sadashivanagar
- Village
- Location within Telangana Location within India
- Coordinates: 18°24′37″N 78°16′20″E
- Country: India
- State: Telangana

Area
  - Total: 15 km^{2} (5.8 sq mi)
  - Rank: 1

Population
  - Total: 8,000
  - Rank: 1 in mandal
  - Density: 530/km^{2} (1,400/sq mi)

Languages
  - Official: Telugu
- Time zone: UTC+5:30 (IST)
- Postal code: 503145
- Vehicle registration: TS 17

Sadasivanagar is a village and a Mandal in Nizamabad district in the state of Telangana in India.

Every year, celebrates Sri kashi Vishweshwara Swamy Kalyanam, Shiva rathri, Sri Krishna ashtami, Hanuman Jayanthi and Datta Jayanthi.

== Geography ==
Which is located between Kamareddy and Nizamabad. Sadashivanagar is located at Coordinates:18.404379°N 78.269214°E. It is 120 km from the state capital of Hyderabad, 12 km from district headquarter Kamareddy. However, Sadashivanagar comes under the Zahirabad parliamentary constituency.

It has fort (locally called as GADI) in the center of the village. This fort was built by kameneni dynasty (called as Doralu)

== Language ==
Major languages spoken in this area are Telugu, Hindi, Urdu and English. Telugu is the native language for most residents.

== Occupation ==
The main occupation for many people is in agriculture. Sugarcane, paddy, soya, cotton, and corn are the primary crops.
