= Jakranpally =

Jakranpally Jaurampally
- Mandal
- Jakranpally
- Nickname: Jaurampally
- Location in Telangana, India Jakranpally (India)
- Coordinates: 18.717492°N 78.277174°E
- Country: India
- State: Telangana

Population (2011)
  - Total: 6,281

Languages
  - Official: Telugu
- Time zone: UTC+5:30 (IST)
- Postal Index Number: 503175
- Vehicle registration: TS 16
- Website: https://jakranpally.com

Jakranpally also called Jaurampally or Jaurampalli is a Mandal in Nizamabad district in the state of Telangana in India. An Airport has been Proposed in Jakranpally Mandal border along with surrounding villages of Manoharabad, Kolipak, Thorlikonda borders. which carries out domestic transport.

== Villages ==
The Mandal comprises several villages:

1. Manoharabad
2. Padakal
3. Kaligote
4. Kolipak
5. Thorlikonda
6. Brahmanapally
7. Jakranpally
8. Argul
9. Narayanpet
10. Munipally
11. Lakshmapur
12. Sikindrapur
13. Chinthaloor
14. Mailaram
15. Keshpally
16. Puppalapally

== Education ==
The Mandal headquarters hosts a Government Model School. Every village has at least one primary school, complemented by private institutions that offer both primary and secondary education.

== Income ==
Agriculture is the mainstay of the local economy, providing the primary source of income for residents in all villages. The major crops cultivated in the region include paddy, turmeric, maize, and a variety of vegetables. Farming practices typically rely on a combination of rain-fed and irrigated methods, supported by local water bodies, borewells. In recent years, the adoption of modern agricultural techniques and the use of improved seed varieties have contributed to enhanced crop yields.

== Politics ==
Political engagement in the region was significant, with major parties such as the Indian National Congress, Bharat Rashtra Samithi, and Bharatiya Janata Party establishing local offices and active cadres. Notable political figures from the area included the late Argul Rajaram, a former minister, and the late Keshpally Ganga Reddy, a former Member of Parliament from Nizamabad.

== Notable people ==
[1] Ramesh Karthik Nayak, Telugu Poet and Writer belongs from this Village Thanda.

== Industries ==
FPO Initiative Launched in Manoharabad Under "JMKPM"

A new milestone has been achieved for the farmers of Manoharabad and surrounding villages. The Farmers Producers Organization (FPO), comprising farmer-owned and farmer-produced products, has officially been approved by the Central Government.

This initiative brings together the unity and collaboration of five villages —

Jakranpally, Manoharabad, Kaligot, Padkal, Mailaram

forming the collective identity known as "JMKPM".

The FPO aims to empower local farmers by enabling better market access, increasing their bargaining power, and promoting sustainable agricultural practices. The FPO launch the beginning of a new chapter where unity among villages transforms into prosperity for all.

== Transport ==
Jakranpally is located right next to National Highway 44, the longest national highway in India. It is well-connected by road and offers comprehensive transport facilities.

Regular buses to Hyderabad pass through the local bus stand, and local bus services from Armoor Town connect Jakranpally to the surrounding villages.

The nearest railway stations are: Armoor, approximately 10 km away. Dichpally, approximately 15 km away. Nizamabad, nearly 25 Km away.

Additionally, private auto-rickshaws are readily available for local transportation of passengers and goods.
