= Rameshwarpalli =

- Village
- Location in Telangana, India Rameshwarpalli (India)
- Coordinates: 18.190461°N 78.390019°E
- Country: India
- State: Telangana
- Region: Nizamabad District
- District: Nizamabad district

Languages
  - Official: Telugu
- Time zone: UTC+5:30 (IST)
- PIN: 503101
- Vehicle registration: TS

Rameshwarpalli is a village in Nizamabad district, in Telangana State.

== Transport ==
The village is situated near National Highway 7 (India) Highway with connections to nearby towns and cities with regular buses and other modes of transportation.
