= Sirikonda =

- Village
- Location in Telangana, India Sirikonda (India)
- Coordinates: 17°10′N 79°42′E
- Country: India
- State: Telangana
- District: Nizamabad

Languages
  - Official: Telugu
- Time zone: UTC+5:30 (IST)
- PIN: 508212
- Vehicle registration: TS
- Website: telangana.gov.in

Sirikonda is a village in the Nizamabad district of Telangana, India.
