= G. S. Varadachary =

Indian film critic and journalist (1932–2022)

- Born: 24 October 1932; Armoor, Nizamabad district, Hyderabad State, British Raj
- Died: 3 November 2022 (aged 90); Hyderabad, Telangana, India
- Occupations: film critic, journalist

G. S. Varadachary (15 October 1932 – 3 November 2022) was an Indian Telugu language film critic and journalist. He was Assistant Editor of Andhra Bhoomi till his retirement in 1988.

== Life ==
Varadachary was born in Armoor in Nizamabad. He started his journalism career with Andhra Janata in 1948.

Varadachary was Vice President of Telugu Bhashodyama Samakhya, which fights for Telugu language usage in government. He received an honorary doctorate from Telugu University for journalism.

Varadachary died following a brief illness at the KIMS Hospital in Hyderabad, on 3 November 2022, at the age of 90.

== Awards ==
- V R Narla Life Time Achievement Award - 2005

== Bibliography ==
- Ilaagenaa Rayadam (2003)
- Diddubatu (2003)
- Mana Patrikeya Velugulu (2010)
