= Mendora mandal =

Mendora
- Village
- Location in Telangana, India Mendora (India)
- Coordinates: 18°57′N 78°24′E
- Country: India
- State: Telangana
- District: Nizamabad

Government
  - Member of Parliament: Dharmapuri Arvind
  - Member of the Legislative Assembly: Vemula Prashanth Reddy

Area
  - Total: 15.29 km^{2} (5.90 sq mi)
- Elevation: 384 m (1,260 ft)

Population (2011)
  - Total: 4,981
  - Density: 325.8/km^{2} (843.7/sq mi)

Languages
  - Official: Telugu
- Time zone: UTC+5:30 (IST)
- PIN: 503219
- Telephone code: 91-8463
- Vehicle registration: TS 16
- Literacy: 48.5%
- Lok Sabha constituency: Nizamabad
- Vidhan Sabha constituency: Balkonda

Mendora is a mandal in Nizamabad district in the state of Telangana in India. Mendora is situated beside NH 44. There are 1306 houses in Mendora. It is located 54 km towards East from District headquarters Nizamabad.

== Demographics ==
Total Population in 2011 census is approximately 4981 of whom 2431 are male and 2550 are female. Average Sex Ratio of Mendora village is 1049 which is higher than the national average. There are 450 children of age group 0 to 6 years. Among them 237 are boys and 213 are girls.

== Work profile ==
In Mendora village out of total population, 2945 were engaged in work activities. 82.55% of workers describe their work as Main Work (Employment or Earning more than 6 Months) while 17.45% were involved in Marginal activity providing livelihood for less than 6 months. Of 2945 workers engaged in Main Work, 854 were cultivators (owner or co-owner) while 913 were Agricultural labourer.

== Geography ==
Coordinates: 18°57′N 78°24′E
