= Triveni Sangam =

Junction of three rivers in India

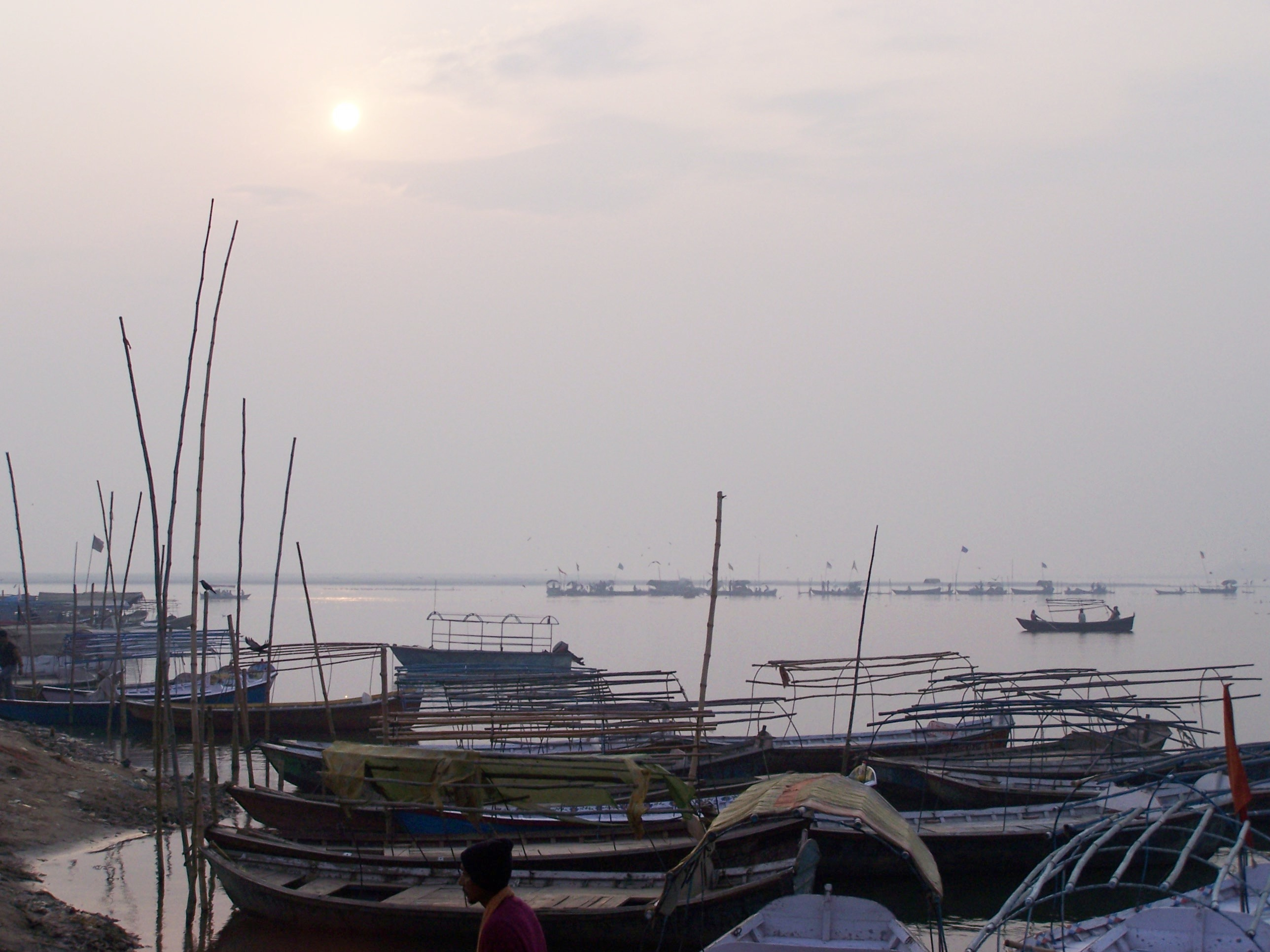
The Triveni Sangam, the intersection of the Yamuna River and the Ganges River

In Hindu tradition, Triveni Sangam is a confluence (Sanskrit: sangama) of three rivers that is a sacred place, with a bath there said to flush away all of one's sins and free one from the cycle of rebirth. The best-known of these confluences is the Triveni Sangam in Prayagraj which is the site of Kumbh Mela.

== Triveni Sangam in Prayagraj ==
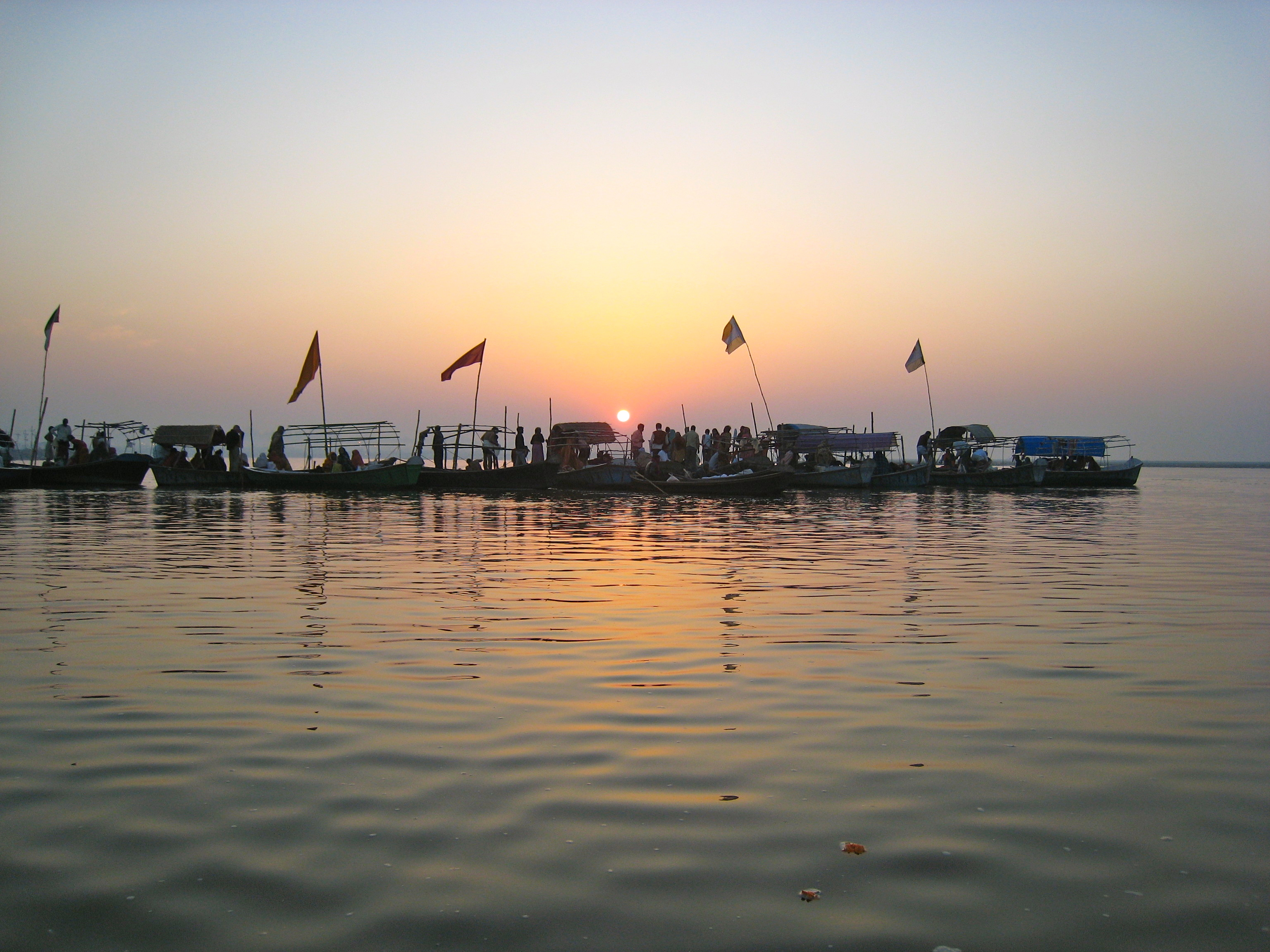
Pilgrims at the Triveni Sangam, the confluence of the Ganges, Yamuna and a sacred third river, the Sarasvati, at Prayag.

Triveni Sangam Prayagraj is the confluence of the Ganges, the Yamuna, and the mythical Saraswati River in Prayagraj and the location of Kumbh Mela. A place of religious importance and one of the sites for the historic Kumbh Mela held every 12 years, over the years it has also been the site of the immersion of ashes of several national leaders, including Mahatma Gandhi in 1949 and Atal Bihari Bajpayee in 2018.

At the Triveni Sangam, the distinct characteristics of the rivers are visible: the Ganges is described as flowing white, while the Yamuna appears darker blue or green. Meanwhile, the mythical Saraswati River, is described as invisible flowing underground and joining from below.

The auspiciousness of the confluence of two rivers is referred to in the Rigveda, which says, "Those who bathe at the place where the two rivers, white and dark, flow together, rise up to heaven."

== Triveni Sangam in Gir Somnath ==
The Triveni Sangam in Gir Somnath is located near Somnath Temple, Veraval in Gir-Somnath district, Gujarat. It marks the confluence of rivers Hiran, Kapila and the Saraswati, where they meet the Arabian Sea on the west coast of India.

== Triveni Sangam in West Bengal ==
In the town of Tribeni in Hooghly district in West Bengal, the river Bhagirathi Hooghly, one of the two main distributaries of the Ganges, splits into three more distributaries which are called Ganga, Jamuna and Saraswati. This place is called Tribeni and is of great religious significance to Hindus. It is believed that the "Yukta Veni" (connected) of Prayag in Prayagraj becomes "Mukta Veni" (disentangled) in Tribeni Sangam. At present, due to the changing course of the river in this extremely geologically active Bengal delta region, the Jamuna river of Bengal has almost disappeared and the stream of Saraswati is also rather thin, but in the past all three channels used to carry significant portions of the flow.

== Triveni Sangam in Tamil Nadu ==
The Triveni Sangam in Kooduthurai, Erode, Tamil Nadu is a confluence of the Kaveri, Bhavani and Amudha and is known as the South Indian Triveni Sangam, or Dakshina Sangam.

== Nepal ==
Triveni Dham is a confluence of three rivers, Sona, Tamasa and Sapta Gandaki located in Binayi Tribeni Rural Municipality, Nawalparasi district of Nepal.

== Other Triveni Sangams ==
=== Bhagamandala ===
Bhagamandala is a pilgrimage place in Kodagu district of Karnataka. It is situated on the river Kaveri in its upstream stretches. At this place, the Kaveri is joined by two tributaries, the Kannike and the Sujyoti river. It is considered sacred as a river confluence (kudala or triveni sangama, in Kannada and Sanskrit respectively).

=== Tirumakudalu Narasipura ===
Tirumakudalu Narasipura, commonly known as T. Narasipura, is a panchayat town in Mysore district in the Indian state of Karnataka. The first name refers to the land at the confluence (trimakuta in Sanskrit) at the confluence of the Kaveri, Kabini and Spatika Sarovara (a lake or spring, also named Gupta Gamini). This is the place in South India where local Kumbhamela is held every three years.

=== Moovattupuzha ===
Kaliyar (Kali river), Thodupuzhayar (Thodupuzha river) and Kothayar (Kothamangalam river) merge and become Muvattupuzha river in Kerala and hence this place is called Muvattupuzha.

=== Munnar ===
Munnar city is where Mudhirapuzha, Nallathanni and Kundala rivers merge, the name Munnar literally means "three rivers" in Malayalam and Tamil.

=== Telangana ===
Kandakurthi is a village in Renjal mandal of Nizamabad district in the Indian state of Telangana. The river Godavari merges with the rivers Manjira and Haridra.

Godavari Ghat, Kaleshwaram At Kaleshwaram, the Triveni Sangamam is considered a sacred confluence where devotees gather to perform rituals. The confluence of three rivers makes the site particularly powerful in spiritual terms. People believe that taking a holy dip during Pushkaralu provides spiritual purification and fulfils personal wishes.

During the 12-day festival, a variety of homams, pujas and aarti are conducted at major temples such as the Kaleshwara Mukteswara Swamy Temple

=== Bhilwara ===
Bhilwara is a district in the Indian state of Rajasthan. The river Banas merges with the rivers Berach and Menali.

Fatuha is a town in the Indian state of Bihar. The river Punpun merges with the rivers Ganga and secret river Saraswati.
