= Surbiryal, Nizamabad district =

Surbiyal
- Coordinates: 18°51′27″N 78°17′44″E
- Country: India
- State: Telangana
- District: Nizamabad district

Surbiryal is a village in Nizamabad district, Telangana, India.

== Geography ==
Surbiryal's climate is tropical wet and dry with most rainfall from June to October. The maximum temperature can be as high as 47°C in the summer and in the winter the temperature is as low as 50°C. The annual rainfall in the village is about 1000 mm. Most of the rain comes from the south-west monsoon winds. The boundaries of village are Fathepoor village in the east, Pipri village in the south, Maggidi village in the west and Komanpalli, Jalalpur villages in the north. The seacoast is quite far.

== Population and education ==
As of 2011 India census, Surbiryal had a population of 2,923. Number of households 749. Males constitute 52% of the population and females 48%. It has an average literacy rate of 61%, higher than the national average of 59.5%: male literacy is 72%, and female literacy is 52%.

== Economy ==
The economy sources of the village people is mainly from agriculture and Surbiryal is well known for financial business in Armoor zone. The major crops pasupu, mokkajonna, vari, soybean in khareef season and jonnalu, sajjalu, pappudanyalu, nuvvulu, vegetable rabi crops are cultivated in very large scale.

Census Parameter Census Data : Total Population 2923 Total No of Houses 749 Female Population 52% (1521) Total Literacy rate 53.9% (1576) Female Literacy rate 22.4% (655) Scheduled Tribes Population 11.4% (333) Scheduled Caste Population 27.5% (803) Working force population 59.5% Child (0-6) Population by 2011: 331 Girl Child(0-6) Population by 2011 52.9% (175) Total Area : 1625 acres
