= Thippapur =

- Village
- Location in Telangana, India Thippapur (India)
- Coordinates: 17.261605°N 77.970908°E
- Country: India
- State: Telangana
- Region: Nizamabad District
- District: Nizamabad district

Languages
  - Official: Telugu
- Time zone: UTC+5:30 (IST)
- PIN: 501101

Thippapur is a village in Nizamabad district, in Telangana State.

== Transport ==
The village is situated near Bijapur Road with connections to nearby towns and cities with regular buses and other modes of transportation.
