= Ramesh Karthik Nayak =

Indian writer and poet (born 1997)

Nunnavath Karthik Nayak
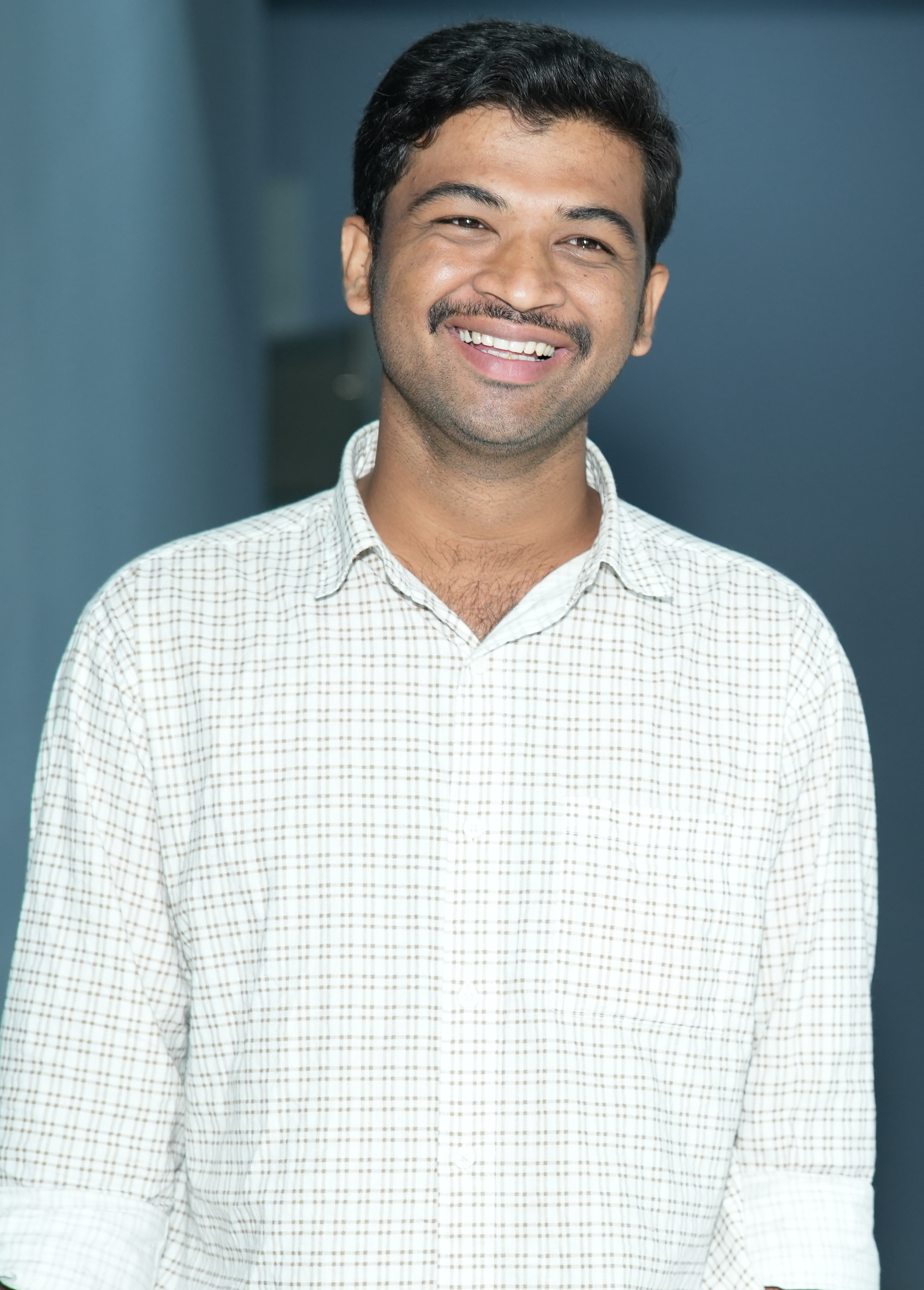
- Ramesh Karthik Nayak in 2025
- Born: Nunnavath Karthik; 14 December 1997 (age 28); Jakranpally Tanda, Nizamabad District, Telangana
- Education: EFLU; BRAOU; Osmania University
- Occupations: Author; Translator; Lecturer; TV Anchor
- Writing career
- Pen name: Ramesh Karthik Nayak
- Years active: 2018–present
- Period: Contemporary
- Genres: Poetry; Short story
- Subject: Banjara Indigenous literature
- Notable works: Balder Bandi; Dhaavlo; Kesula; Chakmak
- Notable awards: The Muse India Young writer Award for Poetry; Raavi Shastry Katha Puraskaram; Sahitya Akademi Yuva Puraskar

Nunnavath Karthik Nayak (also known as Ramesh Karthik Nayak) (Hindi pronunciation: [rəmeːɕ kɑːrt̪iːk nɑːjək];born in 1997) is a Telugu writer, who writes about the lifestyle of Banjara community he belongs to. His short story collection, Dhavlo won him Yuva Puraskar for Telugu for 2024. He writes in Banjari language in Telugu script, in Telugu and in English. His writings have appeared in Poetry at Sangam, Indian Periodical, Live Wire, Outlook India, Nether Quarterly, Borderless Journal and his story, ‘The Story of Birth’ was published in Exchanges: Journal of Literary Translation, University of IOWA.

Ramesh Karthik Nayak was honoured with the prestigious Sahitya Akademi Yuva Puraskar 2024 for his collection of short stories Dhavlo (Song of Lament, 2021), he is the first tribal person and the youngest recipient to get the Telugu literature award.

Ramesh Karthik Nayak curated The Prakriti Foundation's six-day poetry festival in January 2026 which was held at Amdavadi Gujarati Snack House, Nungambakkam.

== Literary works ==
- Balder Bandi, Collection of poems in Telugu. Published year: 2018
- Dhavlo, short story collection in Telugu. Published by Anvikshiki PVT. Published year: 2021.
- Kesula, compilation of short stories. Co- edited along with Prof Surya Dhananjay. Published by Telangana Sahitya academy - 2022.
- Chakmak is his debut collection of poems in English. Published by Red River Press. Published year: 8 August 2023.

== Recognition ==
1. Awarded Tribal young achiever award for contribution to tribal Literature(Telugu), Telangana State Tribal Welfare Department, 9 August 2021.
2. One of his poems is taught as part of the Telugu literature curriculum at SR&BGNR Gov't Degree College, Telangana State.
3. Balder Bandi, Collection of poems taught as part of the M. A- Telugu literature curriculum(2nd Year) at Andhra University, Vishakapatnam.
4. Balder Bandi, poetry collection - 2018 (Twice shortlisted for Kendra Sahitya academy Yuva Puraskar - 2021 and 2023.)
5. Dhaavlo, short story collection - 2021 (Twice shortlisted Kendra Sahitya academy Yuva Puraskar - 2022 and 2023.)
6. Chilakamarthi Lakshmi Narasimha Puraskar - 2018, Hyderabad.
7. Telangana state literary award, 2018 - Bodhan.
8. Nava svaranjali puraskar, 2019- Muvva Rangaiah Foundation. Khammam.
9. Awarded Tribal young achiever award for contribution to tribal Literature(Telugu), Telangana State Tribal Welfare Department, 9 August 2021.
10. Banjara Youth Icon Award, 2021- Warangal.
11. Ravi Sasthri Kadha Puraskaram, July 2023- Udayini, Vishakapatnam.
12. Sahitya Akademi Yuva Puraskar for Telugu for his short story collection Dhavlo.
13. Muse India Young Writer Award 2024
