= Kotgiri =

Coordinates: 18°34′29.3″N 77°49′15.5″E

Kotagiri karkotagiri
- Village
- Interactive map of Kotagiri
- Country: India
- State: Telangana
- District: Nizamabad

Area
  - Total: 172 km^{2} (66 sq mi)

Population (2021)
  - Total: 15,000
  - Density: 87/km^{2} (230/sq mi)

Languages
  - Official: Telugu, Kannada
- Time zone: UTC+5:30 (IST)
- Postal code: 503207
- Telephone code: 08467
- Nearest city: Bodhan
- Sex ratio: 990/1000 ♂/♀
- Literacy: 80%
- Lok Sabha constituency: Bhanswada
- Website: telangana.gov.in

Kotagiri is a village in Nizamabad district in the state of Telangana in India. One of the largest Hanuman statue of Nizamabad is present here. It is an ancient village, having previously been ruled by ruled by the Kakatiya dynasty.
