= Haridra River =

River in Telangana, India

Coordinates: 18°48′48″N 77°51′50″E

Haridra River is one of the important rivers in Telangana. It flows through the districts of Medak and Nizamabad. The river is considered sacred. A dip in the river water here is believed to relieve one from all kinds of sins as well as chronic diseases.

Haridra River is one of the three rivers which forms the Triveni Sangam. The other two rivers are Godavari and Manjira.
