= Ranjal =

Coordinates: 18°44′45″N 77°56′54″E

Renjal
- Village
- Interactive map of Renjal
- Country: India
- State: Telangana
- District: Nizamabad

Languages
  - Official: Telugu
- Time zone: UTC+5:30 (IST)
- Vehicle registration: TS 16

Renjal is a village in Nizamabad district in the state of Telangana in India.
