= Kammarpally =

- Village
- Location in Telangana, India Kammarpally (India)
- Coordinates: 18°50′10″N 78°30′35″E
- Country: India
- State: Telangana
- District: Nizamabad

Government
  - Body: Mandal praja parishad

Population
  - Total: 12,000

Languages
  - Official: Telugu
- Time zone: UTC+5:30 (IST)
- PIN: 503308
- Telephone code: 08463
- Vehicle registration: TG 16
- Nearest city: Metpally
- Lok Sabha constituency: Nizamabad
- Vidhan Sabha constituency: Balkonda
- Website: telangana.gov.in

Kammarpally is a village and mandal in the Nizamabad district in the state of Telangana in India. It is situated on National Highway 63.

== General information ==
Kammarpally is a mandal in the Nizamabad district of Telangana, India. Kammarpally Mandal headquarters is the town of Kammarpally town. It belongs to the Telangana region and is located 54 km east of district headquarters Nizamabad.

Kammarpally Mandal is bounded by Metpalli Mandal towards the east, Mortad Mandal towards the north, Bheemgal Mandal towards the south, and Velpur Mandal towards the west. Koratla, Nirmal, Jagtial, Armoor, and Nizamabad are nearby cities.

Kammarpally consists of ten villages and ten panchayats. Kammarpally is the biggest village among them. Its elevation is 424 m. It is located on the border of the Nizamabad and Karimnagar districts. Karimnagar District Metpalli is east.

Telugu is the local language. The total population of Kammarpally Mandal is 47,069 in 10,142 houses, across a total of 41 villages and 12 panchayats. Males are 24,536 and females are 22,533.

== Politics ==
TRS, BJP, INC, TDP are the major political parties in this area. Kammarpally Mandal comes under Balkonda assembly constituency. The current MLA is Vemula Prashanth Reddy contested and won from TRS party. Kammarpally Mandal comes under Nizamabad parliament constituency. The current MP is Dharmapuri Aravind

== Reaching the village ==
=== By Railway ===
A railway station in Morthad is 10 km away from Kammarpally. Metapally, Armoor, and Nizamabad railway stations are also nearby. However the nearest major station is in Nizamabad, 50 km away.

=== By Road ===
Armoor and Metpally are nearby towns with road connectivity to Kammarapally.

Banks in Kammarpally: The three banks are Andhra Bank, State Bank Of India, and Telangana Grameena Bank.
