= Yergatla =

Village in Nizamabad, Telangana, India

Coordinates: 18.909°N 78.489°E

Yergatla is a village in the Nizamabad district in the state of Telangana in India.
