= Sirkonda =

Sirikonda
- Village
- Location in Telangana, India
- Coordinates: 19°25′N 78°34′E
- Country: India
- State: Andhra Pradesh

Languages
  - Official: Telugu
- Time zone: UTC+5:30 (IST)
- PIN: 503165
- Vehicle registration: TS
- Lok Sabha constituency: nizamabad
- Vidhan Sabha constituency: nizamabad(rural)

Sirkonda is a village in Nizamabad district in the state of Telangana in India.
