= Yadaram =

Coordinates: 18°14′N 78°32′E

- Village
- Interactive map of Yadaram
- Country: India
- State: Telangana
- District: Ranga Reddy
- Metro: Rangareddy district

Government
  - Body: Mandal Office

Languages
  - Official: Telugu
- Time zone: UTC+5:30 (IST)
- Vehicle registration: TS
- Lok Sabha constituency: Malkajgiri
- Vidhan Sabha constituency: Medchal
- Planning agency: Panchayat
- Civic agency: Mandal Office
- Website: telangana.gov.in

Yadaram is a village and panchayat in Rangareddy district, Telangana, India. It comes under Medchal mandal. It is situated 14 km away from sub-district headquarter Domakonda and 84 km away from district headquarter Nizamabad. The total geographical area of village is 931 hectares. Yadaram has a total population of 2,230 people. There are about 571 houses in Yadaram village. Kamareddy is nearest town to Yadaram which is approximately 34 km away.
