= Varni, India =

Varni
- Town
- Location in Telangana, India Varni (India)
- Coordinates: 18.53227°N 77.895935°E
- Country: India
- State: Telangana
- District: Nizamabad

Area
  - Total: 19.13 km^{2} (7.39 sq mi)
- Elevation: 430 m (1,410 ft)

Population (2019)
  - Total: 14,737
  - Density: 770.4/km^{2} (1,995/sq mi)

Languages
  - Official: Telugu
- Time zone: UTC+5:30 (IST)
- 503201: 503201
- Vehicle registration: TS16
- Website: telangana.gov.in

Varni is a town in Nizamabad district in the Indian state of Telangana. Varni Mandal Headquarters is Varni.

== Geography ==
Varni is located at 18.53227°N 77.895935°E. It has an average elevation of 403 metres. It comes under Banswada Legislative and Zaheerabad Parliamentary constituencies. There is a statue of Netaji Shubash Chandra Bose in center of the town, popularly known as center/Bose bomma.

== Economy ==
The villages under this mandal live mainly on agriculture and animal husbandry. Nizamsagar Project Canal is the main source of irrigation, though many bore-wells are used in recent times. Milk production is high in this area.

== Demography ==
According to Indian census, 2011, the demographic details of Varni mandal are as follows:

- Total Population: 72,230
- Male Population: 35,311 and Female Population: 36,919
- Total Literates: 36,500
