= Velpur =

Vailpur
- Village
- Location in Telangana, India Vailpur (India)
- Coordinates: 18.765162°N 78.393309°E
- Country: India
- State: Telangana
- District: Nizamabad

Government
  - Member of legislative Assembly: Vemula Prashanth Reddy
  - sarpanch: Teegala Radha Mohan Reddy

Population
  - Total: 10,000

Languages
  - Official: Telugu
- Time zone: UTC+5:30 (IST)
- PIN: 503311
- Telephone code: 08463
- Vehicle registration: TS
- Nearest city: Armoor
- Sex ratio: 50:50 ♂/♀
- Literacy: 100%%
- Lok Sabha constituency: Nizamabad
- Vidhan Sabha constituency: Balkonda
- Climate: Nuclear (Köppen)
- Website: telangana.gov.in

Velpur or Vailpoor is a village in Nizamabad district in the state of Telangana in India.
