= Rudrur =

Rudrur రుద్రూర్
- Mandal
- Location in Telangana, India Rudrur (India)
- Coordinates: 18.67°N 77.9°E
- Country: India
- State: Telangana
- District: Nizamabad

Area
  - Total: 8.49 km^{2} (3.28 sq mi)

Population (2019)
  - Total: 12,197
  - Density: 1,440/km^{2} (3,720/sq mi)

Languages
  - Official: Telugu
- Time zone: UTC+5:30 (IST)
- PIN: 503188
- Vehicle registration: TS–16
- Lok Sabha constituency: Zahirabad
- Vidhan Sabha constituency: Banswada
- Website: telangana.gov.in

Rudrur is a town and Mandal headquarter located in Nizamabad district of Telangana in the Banswada Assembly Constituency, India.

== History ==
Rudrur has been declared as new mandal under Nizamabad District on 23/08/2016.

Rudrur has a long history, and there are many forts and ancient Temples. It was once under the rule of Rani Rudhrama Devi subordinates.

Rudrur is located in Nizamabad district, Telangana State with total 2452 families residing. The Rudrur has population of 10164 of which 4934 are males while 5230 are females as per Population Census 2011.

In Rudrur population of children with age 0-6 is 976 which makes up 9.60% of total population. Average Sex Ratio of Rudrur is 1060 which is higher than Telangana state average of 993. Child Sex Ratio for the Rudrur as per census is 1033, higher than Telangana average of 939.

Rudrur has lower literacy rate compared to Telangana. In 2011, literacy rate of Rudrur was 58.48% compared to 67.02% of Telangana. In Rudrur Male literacy stands at 68.01% while female literacy rate was 49.51%.

As per constitution of India and Panchyati Raaj Act, Rudrur is administrated by Sarpanch (Head of Village) who is the elected representative of the locality.

== Research ==
A Regional Sugarcane and Rice Research Station (RS & RRS), Rudrur is established to conduct research activities on development of new varieties and technologies in Sugarcane, Rice and Soybean Crops. The research will help to meet the needs of the Telangana farmers. RS & RRS has so far developed some Sugarcane and Rice varieties.
