= Armoor =

Navanathapuram(Armoor) Navanathapuram
- City
- Nickname: Navanathapuram
- Location in Telangana, India Navanathapuram(Armoor) (India)
- Coordinates: 18.790°N 78.290°E
- Country: India
- State: Telangana
- District: Nizamabad
- Founder: King Indradatta
- Named for: Navanathapuram

Government
  - Type: State
  - Body: Municipality
  - MLA: Sri Paidi Rakesh Reddy

Area
  - Total: 99.99 km^{2} (38.61 sq mi)
  - Rank: Seventh in the state
- Elevation: 372 m (1,220 ft)

Population (2024)
  - Total: 118,000
  - Rank: 2nd in Nizamabad
  - Density: 99.99/km^{2} (259.0/sq mi)

Languages
  - Official: Telugu, Urdu
- Time zone: UTC+5:30 (IST)
- PIN: 503224
- Telephone code: 91-8463
- Vehicle registration: TG-16
- Literacy: 75%
- Lok Sabha constituency: Nizamabad
- Vidhan Sabha constituency: Armoor
- Website: armoormunicipality.telangana.gov.in

Armoor is a city in Nizamabad district, in the state of Telangana in India. Armoor is second biggest city after nizamabad city in nizamabad district. Armoor is situated on NH 63. In the past, it was called Navanathapuram since it has nine mountains around the city Armoor (9 mountains) is a variation of it. It is a municipality with 36 to 38 wards.

== Geography ==
The town is situated approximately 32 kilometers from the district headquarters, Nizamabad, and lies along National Highway 44 and National Highway 63.

== Climate ==
Armoor experiences a tropical climate with distinct dry and wet seasons. The summers are typically hot, with temperatures often exceeding 40°C, especially in the months of April and May. The monsoon season, from June to September, brings much-needed rainfall, which is essential for agriculture. The average annual rainfall is around 800-900 mm, although it can vary depending on monsoon patterns. The winters, spanning from November to February, are mild and pleasant, with temperatures ranging between 15°C and 25°C.

== Government and politics ==
Armoor, classified as a A-grade municipality, has seen significant developments since its establishment in 2006. The civic body is responsible for governing an area of approximately 99.99 km^{2}.

=== Governance ===
- K. V. Ramakrishna (2020–present)
- B. Raju (2015 - 2020)
- D. Narayana (2010 - 2015)
- P. Satyam (2005 - 2010)
- D. Ramulu (2000 - 2005)
- T. Sitaram (1995 - 2000)
- Ramachandra Hande (1990 - 1995)

== Transport ==
Armoor is well connected by National Highway roads NH-44 and NH-63.

=== Rail ===
Armoor railway station (ARMR) is situated on Peddapalli-Nizamabad section.

=== Air ===
The nearest airport is Hyderabad International Airport which is 200 km away.

=== Road ===
The bus facility to Hyderabad is available every 30 minutes. There are 2 bus stations in the city.

== Education ==
Armoor is a major educational center in Telangana. The city is the home to Kshatriya College of Engineering, more than 7 Degree colleges and more than 12 intermediate colleges.

Also, 2 model schools were established in 2014 by the central government in EBBs, to uplift the education system & provide free education in English medium.

== Temples ==
Sri Navanatha Siddeshwara temple is located in Armoor.

== Healthcare ==
Armoor has over 70 hospitals and over 15 super multi specialist hospitals, including surgeons, orthopedics, cardiologist, gynecologist, dental specialists, ENT, eye specialists, RMP's and PMP's.

== Notable Persons ==
1. G. S. Varadachary: Senior Telugu language film critic and journalist.
