= Navipet =

Coordinates: 18°48′08″N 77°59′01″E

Navipet Navipet
- Mandal
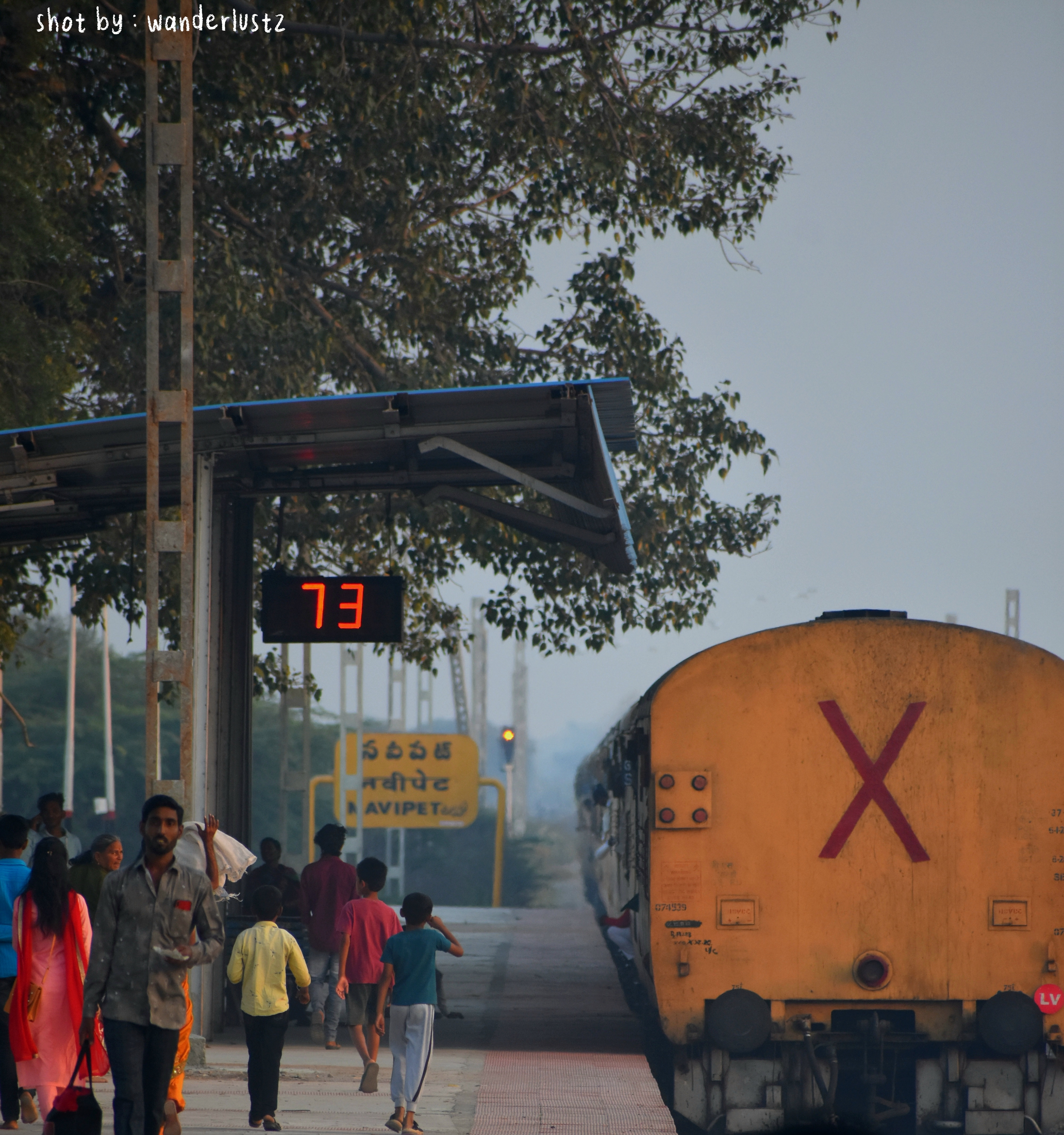
- A Passenger Train Leaving Navipet
- Interactive map of Navipet
- Country: India
- State: Telangana

Government
  - Type: Panchayat
  - Body: Gram Panchayat Under Navipet Mandal
- Demonym: Navipetians

Languages
  - Official: Telugu, Urdu
- Time zone: UTC+5:30 (IST)
- Postal code: 503245
- Telephone code: 08462
- Vehicle registration: TG 16
- Nearest city: Nizamabad
- Lok Sabha constituency: Nizamabad
- Vidhan Sabha constituency: Bodhan
- Website: telangana.gov.in

Navipet is a mandal in located in the Nizamabad district in the state of Telangana in India.

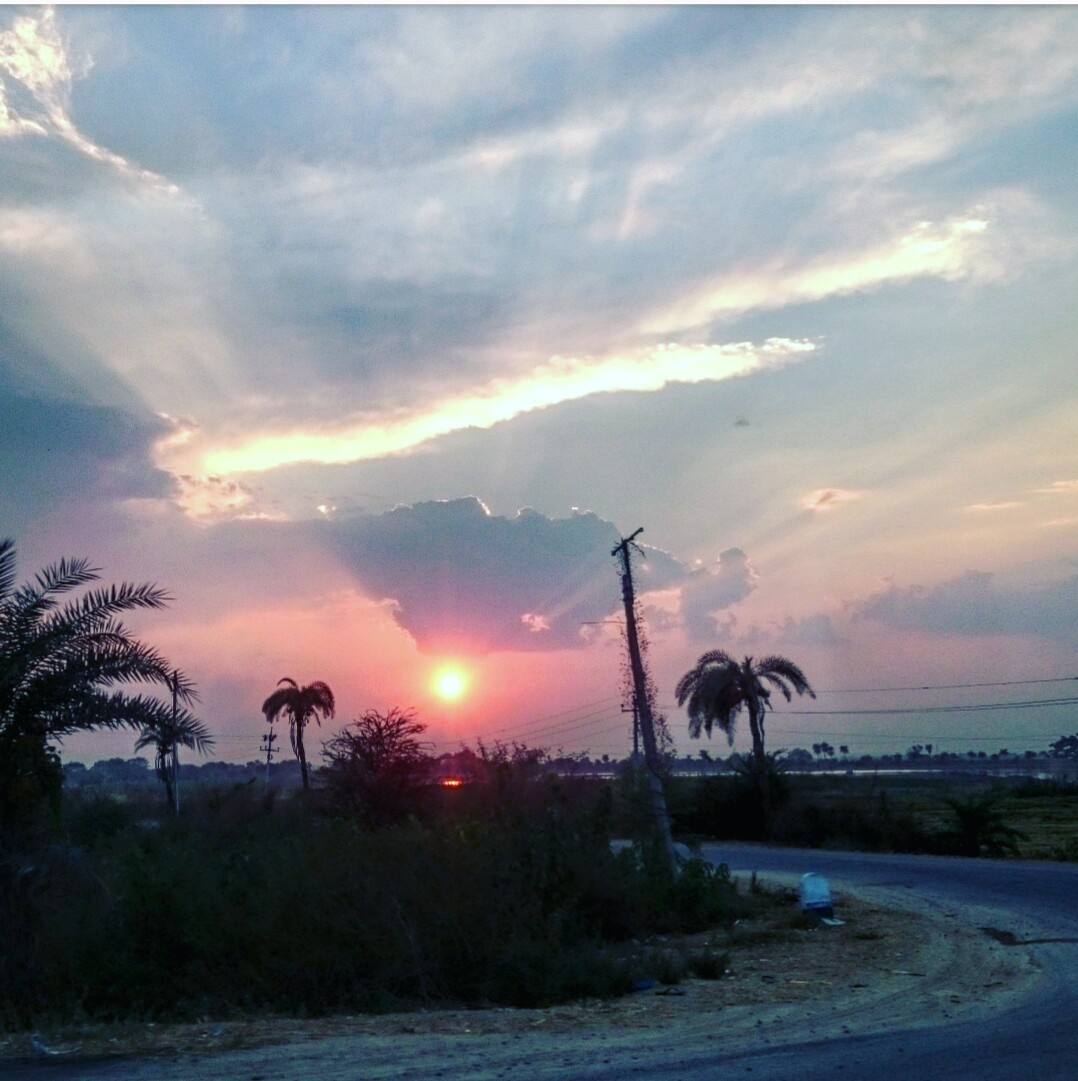
Navipet in winter

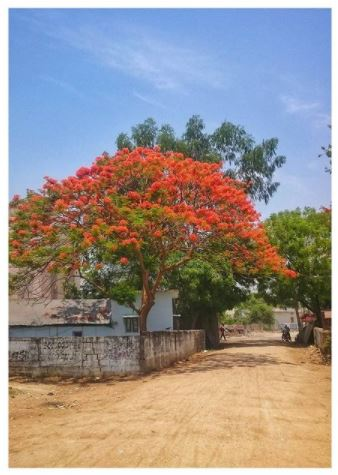
Navipet in Autumn

== Etymology ==
The name Navipet translates to "new village" in Telugu (navi meaning new, and pet meaning village).

== Transport ==
The city is located along the Secunderabad–Manmad railway line.

Destination	Road Distance	Rail Distance	Approx. Travel Time (Road)	Approx. Travel Time (Rail)	Frequency
Hyderabad	188 km (via NH-44 through Kamareddy and Medchal)	178 km	3.5–4.5 hours	4–5 hours	10+ daily buses; 5–6 trains
Nizamabad, Telangana	15 km (via SH-4, direct local road)	14 km	20–30 minutes	15–20 minutes	20+ daily buses; 2+ trains
Basara, Telangana	15 km (via NH-161 towards Nirmal)	14 km	20–30 minutes	15–20 minutes	8–10 daily buses; 4–5 trains (e.g., NSL-SKZR Exp.)
Bhainsa	44 km (via NH-161 through Basar and Nirmal)	~50 km (via Dharmabad)	1–1.5 hours	1–1.5 hours	6–8 daily buses;

The closest airports are Shri Guru Gobind Singh Ji Airport (NDC), located in Nanded, and Rajiv Gandhi International Airport (HYD), located in Hyderabad.

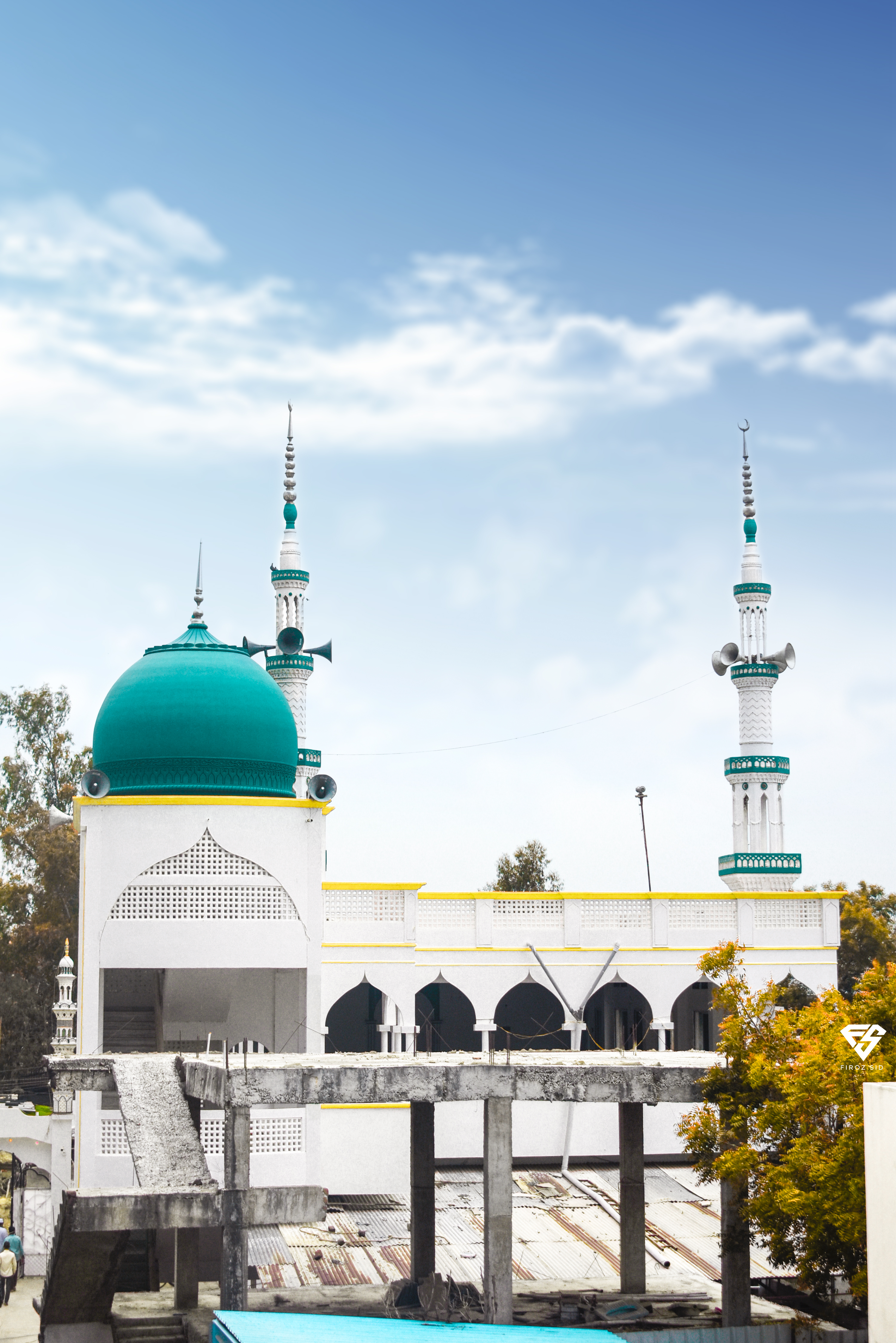
Jama Masjid Navipet - Picture Shot By Zeeshan & Abrar In April 2021 - Modified By Firoz Sid - Themed By Wanderlustz

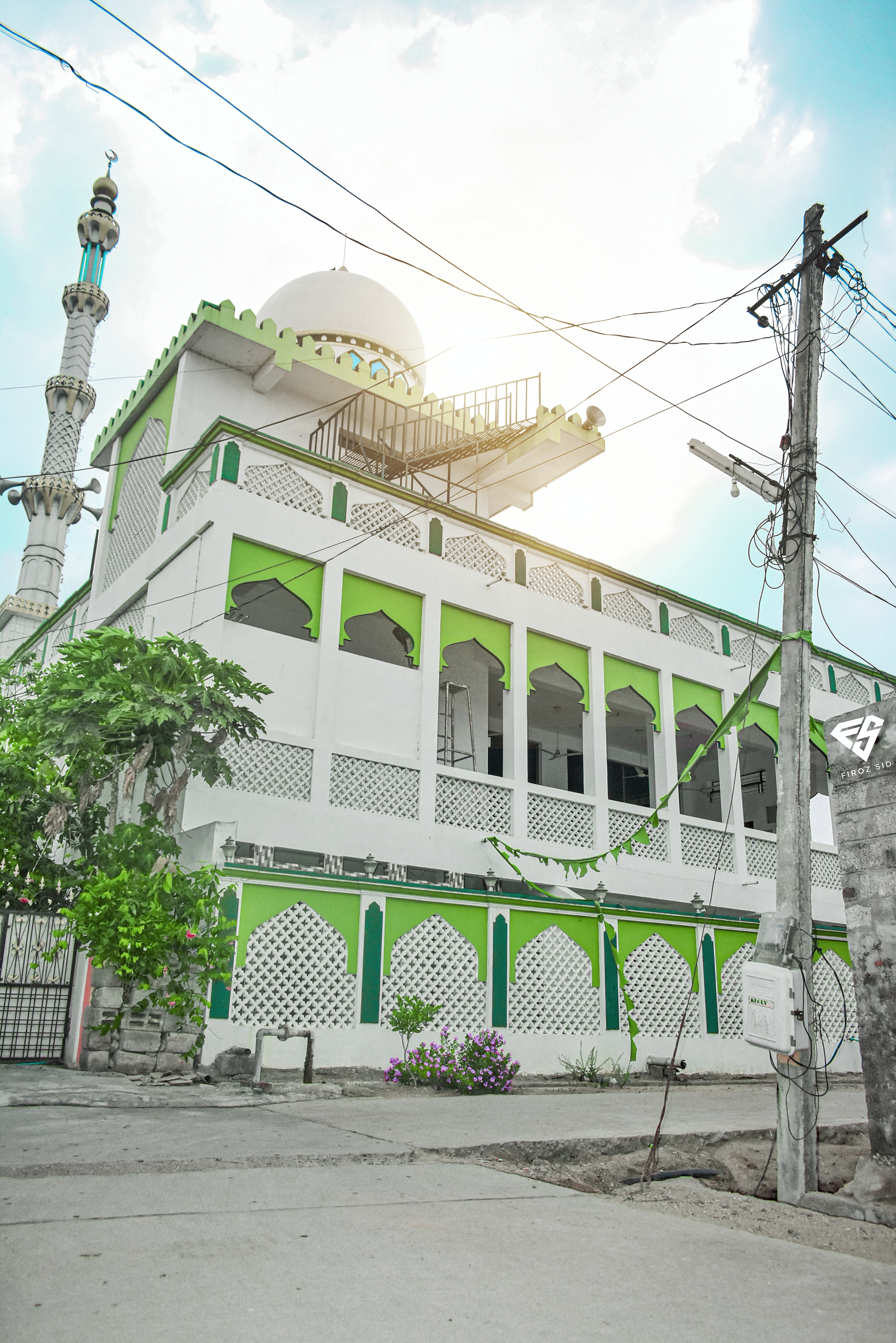
