= Madnur =

- Village
- Location in Telangana, India Madnur (India)
- Coordinates: 18.5000°N 77.6333°E
- Country: India
- State: Telangana
- District: Nizamabad

Government
  - Type: Panchayati raj (India)
  - Body: Gram panchayat
- Elevation: 374 m (1,227 ft)

Languages
  - Official: Telugu
- Time zone: UTC+5:30 (IST)
- Postal code: 503309
- Website: telangana.gov.in

Madnur or Madnoor is a village in Nizamabad district in the state of Telangana in India.

== Geography ==
Madnur or madnoor is located at 18.5000°N 77.6333°E. It has an average elevation of 374 meters (1,227 feet). This village is the Administrative Headquarters for Madnur mandal of Nizamabad district of Telangana state. Madnur is located on state highway 104 Hyderabad to Nagpur. This state route links it to Maharashtra. The village is situated at the junction of three states of India that are Maharashtra, Karnataka and Telangana.

== Languages ==
As the village borders Maharashtra and Karnataka, the people of the village are fluent in Marathi and Kannada languages apart from Telugu. Besides, these people can speak the language Hindi.

== Schools ==
There are separate high school for girls and boys and some primary schools are run by the State Government. Apart from this there is one Residential School and Junior College in the village. Further, some private schools are in the village viz; Vasavi Public School & Karmel Public School

== Tourism ==
Many temples are located in Madnoor village such as Balaji Temple, Hanuman Temple, Santhoshi Matha mandir, Saibaba Temple, Somalingal, Nagareshwar Mandir, and Pochamma Temple. Another famous temple is located nearby Madnoor village i.e., Mirzapur Hanuman Temple; the devotees are come here from Marahashtra, Karnataka & Telangana state for visit, on occasion of Hanuman Jayathi an Jathara will be conducted for 3 days.

== Events ==
On the eve of Dhashera all villagers gather at Hills of Pochamma Temple where "Ravana Dhahana" is to be taken up by the village elders, then everyone visits each other's homes by giving "Jambhi leaves" by treating them as gold. Further, on eve of Ugadhi everyone exchanges a special liquid soup called as "Payasam". On the eve of Sankranthi everyone goes to their agriculture fields and make pooja and kids will play with kites. Later at night every one goes to another's home and distributes a sweet which is called as "Nuvvulu".

== Offices ==
Before formation of Mandals, Madnoor is an erstwhile samithi headquarter of Jukkal Samithi. At present various Government officer are there like MPDO Office, Tahsil Office, Gram Panchayat, Agriculture Market Committee, MEO Office, Police Station, Veterinary dispensary, Primary Health Center, Child & Women Development Agency, Asst. Social Welfare Office, etc.

== Agriculture ==
Most of the agricultural lands are black-soiled land, and the main crops for farmers are cotton, millet, soybean, green gram and black gram.

== Factories ==
As the village is a cotton production village, a lot of cotton factories are established in the nearby village and most people and farmers will get employment in these factories which are the backbone of the village.
