= Makloor =

Makloor Maklur
- village
- Location in Telangana, India Makloor (India)
- Coordinates: 18.753967°N 78.111978°E
- Country: India
- State: Telangana

Languages
  - Official: Telugu
- Time zone: UTC+5:30 (IST)
- Vehicle registration: TS
- Website: telangana.gov.in

Makloor is a village and a Mandal in Nizamabad district in the state of Telangana in India. It is 10 km from Nizamabad.
