= Balkonda =

Coordinates: 18°52′21.4″N 78°20′35.6″E

Balkonda is a village and a Mandal in Nizamabad district in the state of Telangana in India.

== Geography ==
Balkonda mandal can be located at EL780 16ꞌ57.4"- 780 27ꞌ24.64" NL180 49ꞌ4.74"-190 0ꞌ16.74"
