= Nandipet =

Coordinates: 18°57′44″N 78°10′38″E

- Mandal (village)
- Interactive map of Nandipet
- Country: India
- State: Telangana

Population
  - Total: 67,890

Telugu & Urdu
  - Official: Vani Sambaru Sarpanch
- Time zone: UTC+5:30 (IST)
- Postal code: 503212
- Vehicle registration: TS 16
- Website: telangana.gov.in
- (Village) Nandipet (Mandal) Nandipet (District) Nizamabad Post Box No. 503212, Telangana, India

Nandipet is a town/village and mandal in Nizamabad District in the state of Telangana in India, around 25 km from Nizamabad. Palugugutta (Navasiddula Gutta) is a famous place in Nandipet mandal. The name of Nandipet itself came from a famous Nandi temple in the town. There are 28 village panchayats out of 32 villages in this mandal. Some of the villages, such as Donkeshwer, Nikalpoor, Annaram and Vannel K, are bordered by the river Godavari, which flows within Maharashtra and Telangana states. Donkeshwer is developed village in Nandipet mandal. In 2022 Donkeshwer became new mandal by adding some villages from Nandipet mandal. Turmeric is grown there.
