= Manjira River =

Tributary of river Godavari

Coordinates: 19.9300°N 73.5275°E

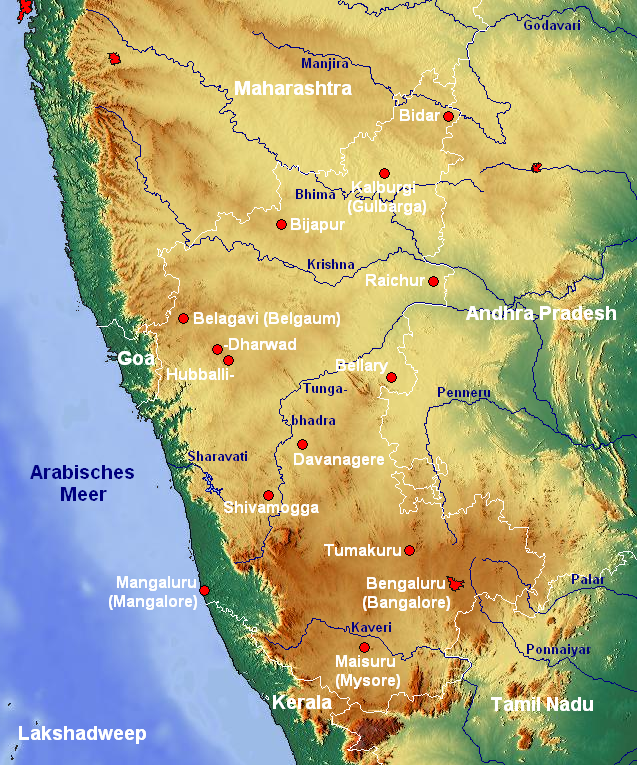
- Manjara rivercourse (top)

Location
- Country: India
- State: Maharashtra, Karnataka, Telangana

Physical characteristics
- Source
  - location: Maharashtra, India
- Mouth: Godavari River
  - location: Sangam, Maharashtra, India
- Length: 724 km (450 mi)
- Basin size: 30,844 km^{2} (11,909 sq mi)
- Discharge
  - location: Sangam

The Manjira river is a tributary of the river Godavari. It passes through the Indian states of Maharashtra, Karnataka and Telangana. It originates in the Balaghat range of hills near the Ahmednagar district of Maharashtra at an altitude of 823 metres (2,700 ft) and empties into the Godavari River. It has a total catchment area of 30,844 square kilometres (3,084,400 ha). This river is one of the Triveni Sangam.

== Description ==
The river's origin is near the Gavalwadi village of the Beed district of Maharashtra. The river flows from the northern boundaries of the Osmanabad district, cutting across the Latur district, goes to the Bidar district of Karnataka and traverses through Sangareddy district, Medak district, Kamareddy district, Nizamabad district of Telangana Before emptying into Godavari River. It flows on the Balaghat plateau along with its tributaries: Terna, Tawarja and Gharni. The other three tributaries of Manjara are Manyad, Teru and Lendi which flow on the northern plains.

The final stretch of the river forms the border between Maharashtra (west) and Telangana (east). Manjira, along with the Haridra River, merges with Godavari River at the border.

=== Tributaries ===
- Terna River: This is the main tributary of Manjara, which flows on the southern boundary of the Ausa Taluka.
- Manyad: This river has its origin at Dharmapuri, and flows through the Ahmadpur Talukat.
- Lendi: This river has its origin in Udgir Taluka, and flows through the Ahmadpur Taluka, joining the Tiru river in Nanded district.
- Gharni: This river has its origin near Wadval and flows through Chakur Taluka.
- Tawarja: This river has its origin near Murud in Latur Taluka, and joins the Manjara river at Shivani on the Latur-Ausa boundary.

== Environment ==
In the late 20th and early 21st centuries, the upper reaches of the Manjira in Maharashtra suffered environmental degradation, which increased runoff, as opposed to groundwater recharge, and increased erosion and silting.

== Dams ==
There are many dams constructed across the Manjira River.

- Eklaspur Small Dam
- Inchuru Small Dam
- Attarga Small Dam
- Mankeshwar Dam
- Sompur Check Dam
- Halhalli Check Dam
- Nittur Manjira Dam
- Chandapur Check Dam
- Koutha Check Dam
- Janwada Barrage
- Singur Dam
- Manjara Dam
- Fasalwadi Check Dam
- Reddikhanapur Small Dam
- Sarafpally Manjira Check Dam
- Andole Check Dam
- Yenigandla Upper Check Dam
- Yenigandla Lower Check Dam
- Paithara Check Dam
- Ghanapur Dam
- Podchenpally Check Dam
- Sardhana Check Dam
- Nizam Sagar Dam
- Sriram Sagar Project
