= Yedapally =

- Village
- Location in Telangana, India Yedapally (India)
- Coordinates: 18.678894°N 77.950487°E
- Country: India
- State: Telangana

Government
  - Type: Panchayati raj (India)
  - Body: Gram panchayat

Languages
  - Official: Telugu
- Time zone: UTC+5:30 (IST)
- Vehicle registration: TS
- Website: telangana.gov.in

Yedapally is both a mandal and a village within Nizamabad district in the Indian state of Telangana.

Agriculture represents the greatest source of income for the village, with paddy fields, sugarcane, and groundnut being the three most grown crops.
