= Pitlam =

Pitlam Pitlam
- town
- Nickname: Pitlam
- Location in Telangana, India Pitlam (India)
- Coordinates: 18.2333°N 77.8333°E
- Country: India
- State: Telangana
- District: Kamareddy

Government
  - Type: Mandal
  - Body: Grama panchayath of Pitlam

Area
  - Total: 4.67 km^{2} (1.80 sq mi)
- Elevation: 423 m (1,388 ft)

Population (2011)
  - Total: 47,581
  - Density: 804/km^{2} (2,080/sq mi)
- Demonym: Pitlamkar

Languages
  - Official: Telugu
- Time zone: UTC+5:30 (IST)
- PIN CODE: 503310
- Vehicle registration: TS17
- Website: telangana.gov.in

Pitlam is a Town and Mandal in the Kamareddy revenue division of the kamareddy district in the Indian state of Telangana.

== Geography ==
Pitlam is a developing town located at 18.2333°N 77.8333°E. It has an average elevation of 423 meters (1391 feet). Nizam Sagar Dam only 7 km away from Pitlam.
