= Mortad =

- Village
- Location in Telangana, India Mortad (India)
- Coordinates: 18.8167°N 78.4833°E
- Country: India
- State: Telangana
- District: Nizamabad

Government
  - Sarpanch: Smt.Bhoga Dharani Anand
- Elevation: 330 m (1,080 ft)

Population (2011)
  - Total: 10,432

Languages
  - Official: Telugu
- Time zone: UTC+5:30 (IST)
- Postal code: 503225
- Vehicle registration: TS
- Website: telangana.gov.in

Mortad is a village in Nizamabad district, in the state of Telangana, India.

== Geography ==
Coordinates- 18°82′N 78°48′E Coordinates: 18°82′N 78°48′E.

== Demographics ==
♦ Total population of Mortad Mandal is 56,376 living in 13,119 Houses, Spread across total 19 villages and 18 panchayats. Males are 27,410 and Females are 28,966.

♦ Total population of Mortad town is 11965. Males are 5,842 and Females are 6,123 with 2693 living Houses.

== Transport ==
National Highway 63 (India) passes through this town.

=== Rail ===
Mortad has a railway station and is located on the Peddapalli-Nizamabad line.
