= Nizamabad district =

- District of Telangana
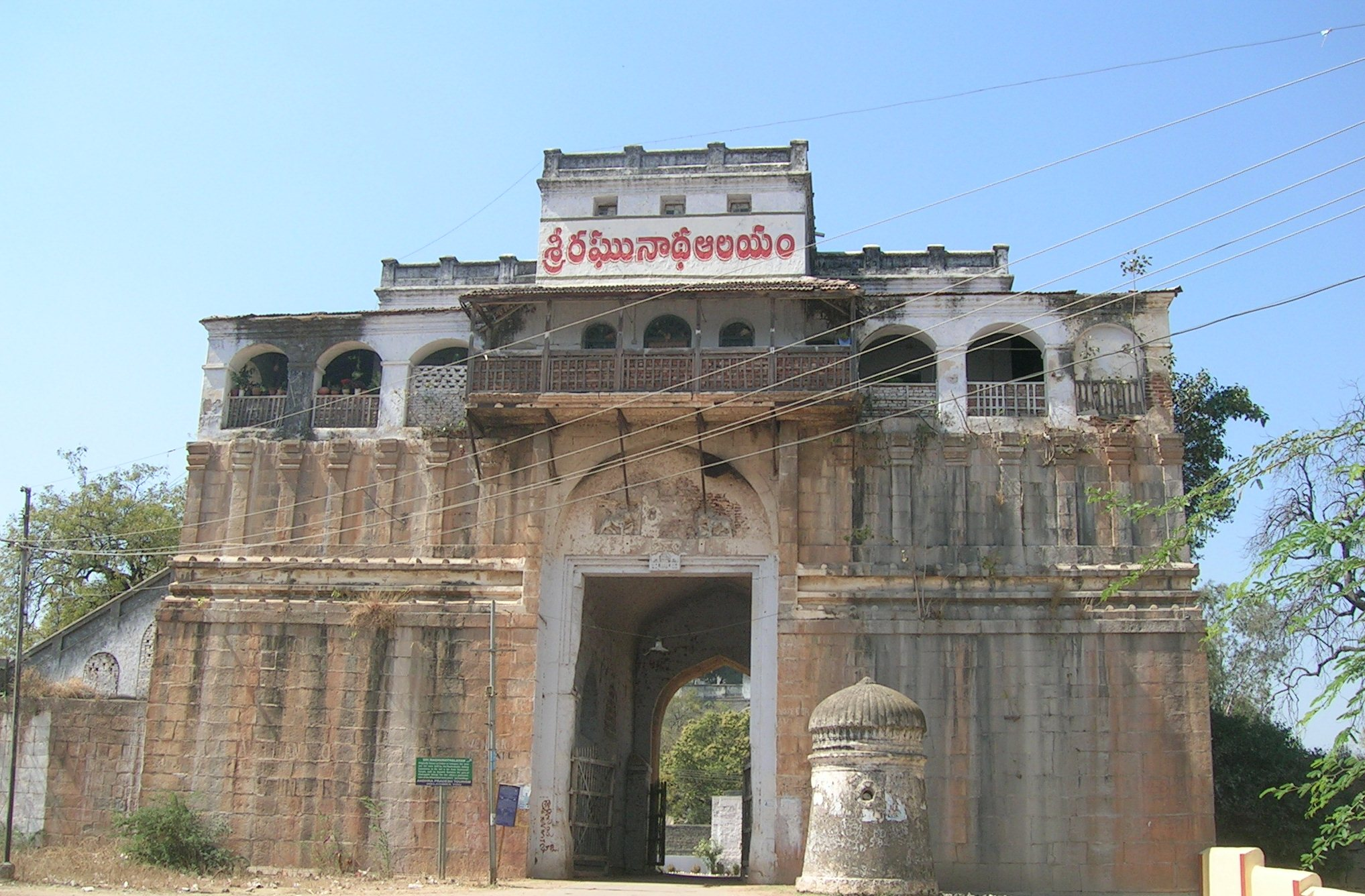
- Nizamabad Fort Entrance

- Location in Telangana
- Nizamabad district
- Country: India
- State: Telangana
- Mandalas: 29
- Founded: 1905
- Headquarters: Nizamabad

Government
  - Body: Zilla Parishad
  - MLA (Urban): Sri Dhanpal Suryanarayana
  - MLA (Rural): Sri Bhoopathi Reddy Rekulapally

Area
  - Total: 4,288 km^{2} (1,656 sq mi)
  - Rank: 10th (in state)

Population (2011)
  - Total: 1,571,022
  - Rank: 5th
  - Density: 366.4/km^{2} (948.9/sq mi)
- Demonym: Nizamabadi

Languages
  - Official: Telugu, Urdu
- Time zone: UTC+5:30 (IST)
- PIN: 503 xxx
- Telephone code: +91-08462
- Vehicle registration: TG 16
- Website: nizamabad.telangana.gov.in

Nizamabad district, is a district located in the north-western region of the Indian state of Telangana. The city of Nizamabad is the district headquarters. The district share boundaries with Jagtial, Sircilla, Nirmal, Kamareddy districts and with Nanded district of the state boundary of Maharashtra.

== Etymology ==
Nizam stands for Nizam, the governor (of the empire) of Hyderabad State and also Abad means 'Long Live'. Nizamabad was founded in the year 1905 when Nizam's Dominion were it recognized, Later during the 18th century the Nizams ruled over the Deccan region and the district got its name from him.

== History ==
In October 2016, the districts of Telangana were reorganized and Kamareddy district was carved out of Nizamabad district making it one of the 31 districts of state.

== Geography ==
The geographical area of the district is 4,288 square kilometres (1,656 sq mi) and it is located at 18°41′N 78°6′E. Nizamabad is bounded on the North by Nirmal district, on the East by Jagtial and Rajanna Sircilla district, on the South lies Kamareddy district, and on the West by Nanded district of Maharashtra State. The Godavari River enters into Telangana from Nizamabad district at Kandakurthi.

== Demographics ==
Religion in Nizamabad district (2011)
Hinduism	79.69%
Islam	18.57%
Christianity	0.99%
Other or not stated	0.75%

As of 2011 Census of India, the district has a population of 1,571,022. Nizamabad has a sex ratio of 1044 females per 1000 males and a literacy rate of 64.25%. 169,621 (10.80%) were under 6 years of age. 464,750 (29.58%) lived in urban areas. Scheduled Castes and Scheduled Tribes made up 217,267 (13.83%) and 107,035 (6.81%) of the population respectively.

In 2006, the Indian government named Nizāmābād one of the country's 250 most backward districts (out of a total of 640). It is one of the ten districts of Telangana currently receiving funds from the Backward Regions Grant Fund Programme (BRGF).

Languages of Nizamabad district (2011)
1. Telugu (71.6%)
2. Urdu (18.3%)
3. Lambadi (5.63%)
4. Marathi (2.17%)
5. Others (2.36%)

At the time of the 2011 census, 71.58% of the population spoke Telugu, 18.26% Urdu, 5.63% Lambadi and 2.17% Marathi as their first language.

== Administrative divisions ==
The district is divided into 3 revenue divisions of Bodhan, Armoor and Nizamabad. These are sub-divided into 34 mandals and has 530 villages. C.Narayana Reddy is the present collector of the district.

=== Mandals ===
The below table categorizes 34 mandals into their respective revenue divisions in the district:

Armoor revenue division	Bodhan revenue division	Nizamabad revenue division
Armoor	Bodhan	Nizamabad South
Balkonda	Yedapally	Nizamabad North
Mupkal	Ranjal	Nizamabad Rural
Mendora	Kotagiri	Mugpal
Kammar palle	Varni	Dichpally
Velpur	Rudrur	Dharpally
Morthad	Chandur	Indalwai
Bheemgal	Mosra	Makloor
Jakranpally	Saloora	Sirikonda
Nandipet	Pothangal	Navipet
Yergatla		Ramadugu
Aloor		
Donkeshwar		

=== Villages ===
- Chikkadpally
- Donkeshwar
- Kandakuthi Triveni Sangamam
- Palem
- Rameshwarpalli
- Thimmanagar
- Thippapur

=== Constituencies ===
Parliamentary Constituency

- Nizamabad Lok Sabhha Constituency

Assembly Constituencies

There are 6 assembly constituencies in the district. They are, Armur, Bodhan, Banswada – Partly (Varni, Chandur, Mosra, Rudrur, Pothangal and Kotagiri Mandals), Nizamabad (Urban), Nizamabad (Rural), Balkonda

== Transport ==
=== Roads ===
Nizamabad district has good road connectivity. Almost all the towns and villages in the district have well laid asphalt roads and are connected to district headquarters. Nizamabad has 2 National Highways passing through it, one being NH 44 which connects Kanyakumari and Varanasi and the other is NH16 which starts from Nizamabad and passes through Karimnagar to Jagadalpur in the state of Chhattisgarh. The Telangana State Road Transport Corporation (TSRTC) runs around 700 buses from district headquarters on a daily basis.

=== Rail ===
Nizamabad railway station is the major train station in the district which is located on Secunderabad–Manmad line of Hyderabad Division of the South Central Railway Zone (SCR). All the towns in the district have a rail network coverage and Nizamabad being one of the important stations on the line carters the need of the people. Jankampet Junction which lies in the west of Nizamabad city connects to Bodhan town.

The Nizamabad–Peddapalli section connects Nizamabad with the Grand Trunk route of New Delhi–Chennai main line and the distance from Nizamabad to Karimnagar and Warangal reduced to a large extent. This line also increased the railway network in the district and the northern cities of Telangana.

=== Airway ===
Nizamabad currently doesn't have its own aerodrome however the state government of Telangana has proposed an airport at Jakranpally Mandal bordering lands with Manoharabad, Kolipak, Thorlikonda villages in Nizamabad. The nearest international facility is Rajiv Gandhi International Airport in Hyderabad located at a distance of 200 km, and a partly functional domestic airport is Shri Guru Gobind Singh Ji Airport located at 110 km in Nanded of Maharashtra State. The city houses 5 Helipads located each at Nagaram Stadium, Parade Grounds, Dichpally and two at Giriraj Govt(GG) College.

== Education ==
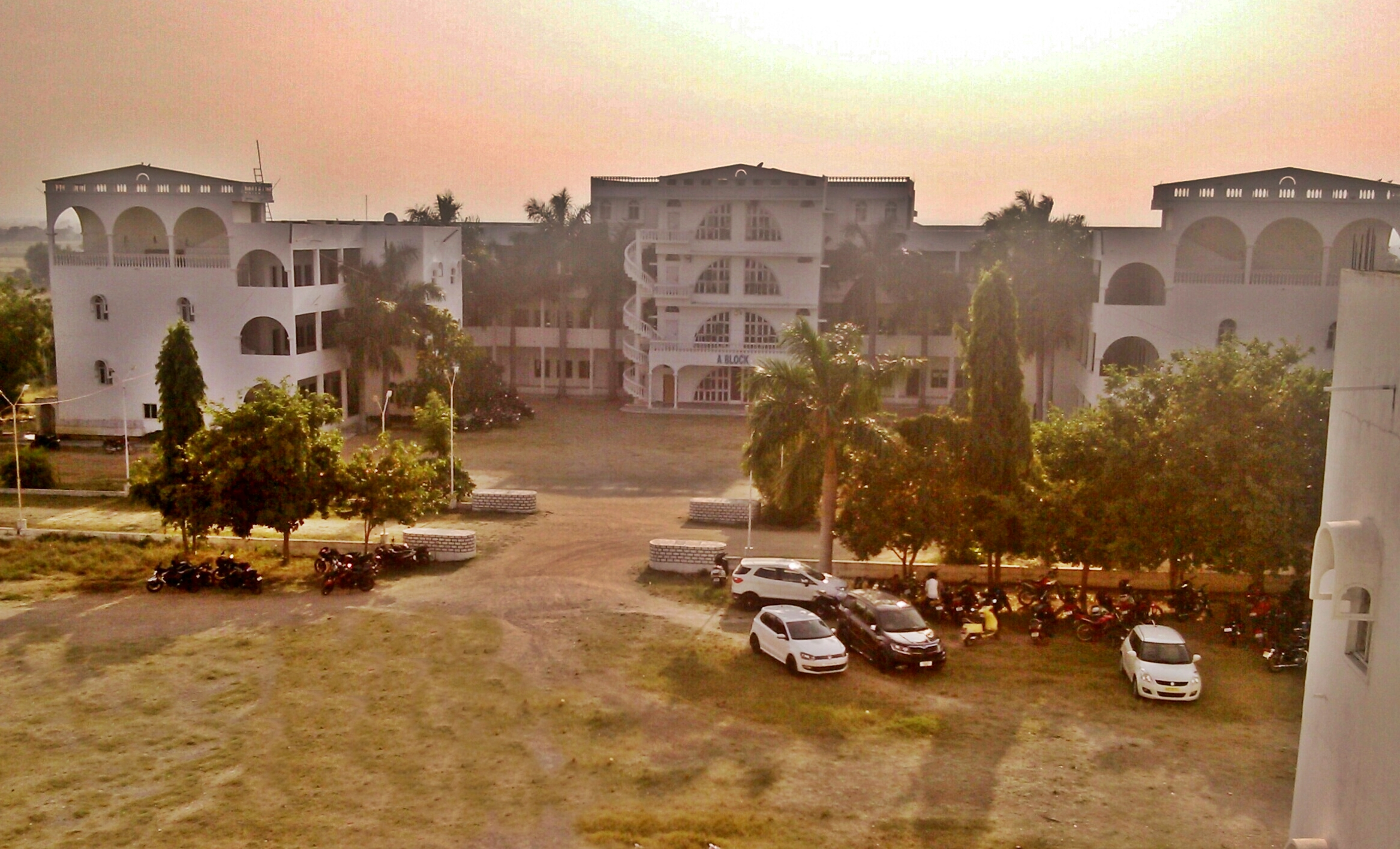
VREC, A Block, Nizamabad

Many engineering colleges are located in the district. Kshatriya College of Engineering, Armoor (KCEA) Vijay Rural Engineering College (VREC), affiliated with Jawaharlal Nehru Technological University, Hyderabad (JNTUH) is the reputed engineering college located in Telangana. Kakatiya Institutions of Nizamabad is a group of institutions known for their excellence in state of Telangana and the erstwhile Andhra Pradesh.

Telangana University is a public university under the government of AP, located at Dichpally, 15 km from the city. There are many educational institutions that provide education namely VREC, Arkay College of Engineering and Technology, Kshatriya College of Engineering, Kakatiya Engineering College for Women, Government Medical College, Nishitha Degree College, etc.

RGUKT, Basar popularly known as IIIT Basar is an autonomous institution located 35 km from Nizamabad. The official name of the institute is Rajiv Gandhi University of Knowledge Technologies. It offers six-year integrated BTech programme with three semesters every year for those passing SSC, for award of dual degrees in different specializations of engineering and science.

== Tourism ==
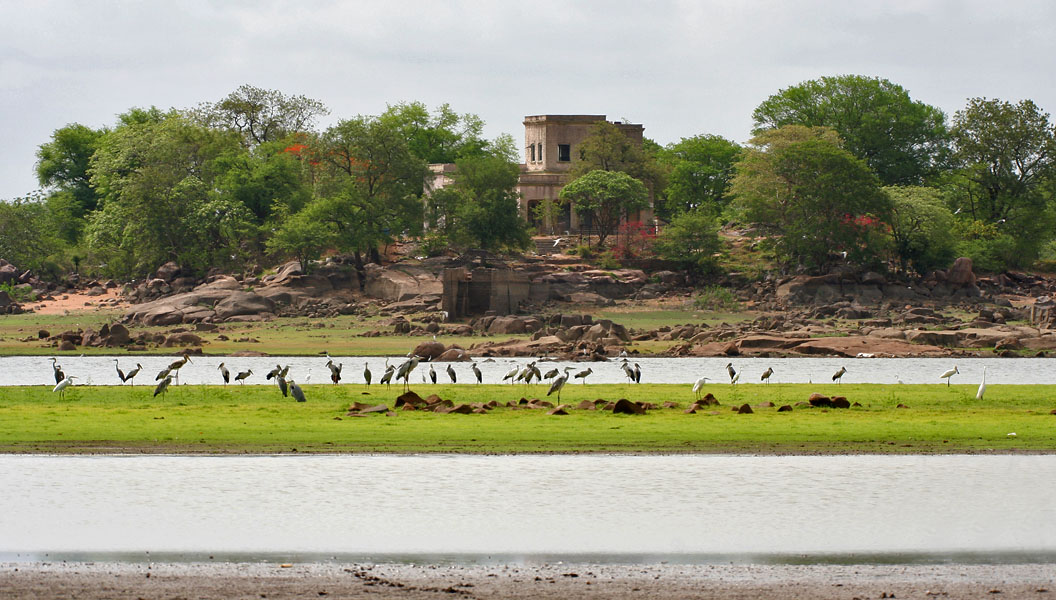
Pocharam lake

- Pocharam Wildlife Sanctuary is a forest and wildlife sanctuary spread across 130 square kilometres (50 sq mi), between the districts of Nizamabad and Medak. It was a former hunting ground of the Nizam that was declared a wildlife sanctuary in the early 20th century.
- Dichpally Ramalayam was one of the oldest kakatiya built temple built on hill top beside the lake situated just 5 km from National Highway 44 from Dichpally Town.
- Armoor Siddula guttaa Temple situated on hill top. 30 km from Nizamabad district Headquarters.
- Alisagar is 10 km (6.2 mi) from Nizamabad city and 2 km (1.2 mi) off the Nizamabad–Bodhan road.

== Notable people ==
For people from Nizamabad city, not the surrounding district, please see Nizamabad

- Malavath Purna, a 13-year-old student from Sirkonda mandal, Nizamabad district became the youngest person to climb Mount Everest when she reached the peak on 25 May 2014. She was accompanied by Sadanapalli Anand, a 17-year-old student from Khammam.
- Dil Raju is a Telugu cinema film-producer from Narsingpally, in Nizamabad district.

== See also ==
- Donkal
- Nizamabad Police Commissionerate
- Gadepalli
- Surbiryal
