= Nizamabad Lok Sabha constituency =

Lok Sabha Constituency in Telangana, India

Coordinates: 18.7°N 78.1°E

Nizamabad TG-4
- Lok Sabha constituency
- Nizamabad Lok Sabha constituency in Telangana

Constituency details
- Country: India
- Region: South India
- State: Telangana
- Assembly constituencies: Armur; Bodhan; Nizamabad (Urban); Nizamabad (Rural); Balkonda; Koratla; Jagtial
- Established: 1952
- Total electors: 14,96,593
- Reservation: None

Member of Parliament
- 18th Lok Sabha
- Incumbent Dharmapuri Arvind
- Party: BJP
- Elected year: 2024

Nizamabad Lok Sabha constituency is one of the 17 Lok Sabha (Lower House of the Parliament) constituencies in Telangana state in southern India.

Dharmapuri Arvind of Bharatiya Janata Party is currently representing the constituency.

== Overview ==
Since its inception in 1952 Nizamabad seat is a Bharatiya Janata Party stronghold, various political outfits like the Indian National Congress and the Bharat Rashtra Samithi have won it during different general elections.

After the formation of Telangana the Bharat Rashtra Samithi won the seat for the first time in 2014 General Election.

== Assembly segments ==
Nizamabad Lok Sabha constituency presently comprises the following Legislative Assembly segments:

| No | Name | District | Member | Party | Leading (in 2024) |
|---|---|---|---|---|---|
| 11 | Armoor | Nizamabad | Paidi Rakesh Reddy | BJP | BJP |
| 12 | Bodhan | Nizamabad | P. Sudarshan Reddy | INC | INC |
| 17 | Nizamabad (Urban) | Nizamabad | Dhanpal Suryanarayana Gupta | BJP | INC |
| 18 | Nizamabad (Rural) | Nizamabad | Rekulapally Bhoopathi Reddy | INC | BJP |
| 19 | Balkonda | Nizamabad | Vemula Prashanth Reddy | BRS | BJP |
| 20 | Koratla | Jagitial | Kalvakuntla Sanjay | BRS | BJP |
| 21 | Jagtial | Jagitial | M. Sanjay Kumar | BRS | INC |

== Members of Parliament ==
| Year | Member | Party |
Hyderabad State
| 1952 | Harish Chandra Heda | Indian National Congress |
Andhra Pradesh
| 1957 | Harish Chandra Heda | Indian National Congress |
| 1962 | Harish Chandra Heda | Indian National Congress |
| 1967 | M. Narayana Reddy | Independent |
| 1971 | M. Ram Gopal Reddy | Indian National Congress |
| 1977 | M. Ram Gopal Reddy | Indian National Congress |
| 1980 | M. Ram Gopal Reddy | Indian National Congress |
| 1984 | Tadur Bala Goud | Indian National Congress |
| 1989 | Tadur Bala Goud | Indian National Congress |
| 1991 | Gaddam Ganga Reddy | Telugu Desam Party |
| 1996 | G. Atmacharan Reddy | Indian National Congress |
| 1998 | Gaddam Ganga Reddy | Telugu Desam Party |
| 1999 | Gaddam Ganga Reddy | Telugu Desam Party |
| 2004 | Madhu Yaskhi Goud | Indian National Congress |
| 2009 | Madhu Yaskhi Goud | Indian National Congress |
Telangana
| 2014 | K. Kavitha | Telangana Rashtra Samithi |
| 2019 | Dharmapuri Arvind | Bharatiya Janata Party |
| 2024 | Dharmapuri Arvind | Bharatiya Janata Party |

== Election results ==
=== General election, 2024 ===
2024 Indian general election: Nizamabad
| Party | Candidate | Votes | % | ±% |
|---|---|---|---|---|
| BJP | Arvind Dharmapuri | 592,318 | 48.02 | ▲2.80 |
| INC | T. Jeevan Reddy | 483,077 | 39.16 | ▲32.64 |
| BRS | Bajireddy Goverdhan | 102,406 | 8.30 | ▼30.25 |
| NOTA | None of the above | 4,483 | 0.36 | ▲0.17 |
| Majority | | 110,241 | 8.86 | ▲2.19 |
| Turnout | | 1,233,581 | 71.92 | ▲3.48 |
| BJP hold | | Swing | ▲2.80 | |

=== General election, 2019 ===
2019 Indian general elections: Nizamabad
| Party | Candidate | Votes | % | ±% |
|---|---|---|---|---|
| BJP | Dharmapuri Arvind | 480,584 | 45.22 | |
| TRS | Kalvakuntla Kavitha | 4,09,709 | 38.55 | |
| INC | Madhu Yaskhi Goud | 69,240 | 6.52 | |
| Independent | Ippa Lachanna | 6,096 | 0.57 | |
| Independent | Asli Ganesh | 2,648 | 0.25 | |
| NOTA | None of the Above | 2,031 | 0.19 | |
| Majority | | 70,875 | 6.67 | +9.50 |
| Turnout | | 10,63,182 | 68.44 | −0.66 |
| BJP gain from TRS | | Swing | +13.69 | |

=== General election, 2014 ===
2014 Indian general elections: Nizamabad
| Party | Candidate | Votes | % | ±% |
|---|---|---|---|---|
| TRS | Kalvakuntla Kavitha | 439,307 | 42.49 | |
| INC | Madhu Yaskhi Goud | 2,72,123 | 26.32 | |
| BJP | Endela Lakshminarayana | 2,25,333 | 21.79 | |
| WPOI | Malik Mohtasim Khan | 43,814 | 4.24 | |
| IND. | Bagwan B | 8,129 | 0.79 | |
| BSP | Talari Ramulu | 7,421 | 0.50 | |
| NOTA | None of the above | 7,266 | 0.70 | |
| Majority | | 1,67,184 | 16.17 | |
| Turnout | | 10,33,924 | 69.10 | +4.57 |
| TRS gain from INC | | Swing | | |

=== General election, 2009 ===
General Election, 2009: Nizamabad
| Party | Candidate | Votes | % | ±% |
|---|---|---|---|---|
| INC | Madhu Yaskhi Goud | 296,504 | 33.33 | |
| TRS | Bigala Ganesh Gupta | 2,36,114 | 26.54 | |
| PRP | Dr.P.Vinay kumar | 1,65,790 | 18.64 | |
| Majority | | 60,390 | 6.79 | |
| Turnout | | 8,89,504 | 66.66 | −2.70 |
| INC hold | | Swing | | |

=== General election, 2004 ===
General Election, 2004: Nizamabad
| Party | Candidate | Votes | % | ±% |
|---|---|---|---|---|
| INC | Madhu Goud Yaskhi | 442,142 | 56.51 | +7.46 |
| TDP | Syed Yusuf Ali | 304,271 | 38.89 | −10.62 |
| BSP | Ramu Yedla | 21,133 | 2.70 | |
| Independent | Ramadasu Baisa | 14,893 | 1.90 | |
| Majority | | 137,871 | 17.62 | +18.08 |
| Turnout | | 782,439 | 69.37 | +0.49 |
| INC hold | | Swing | +7.46 | |

=== General election, 1999 ===
General Election, 1999: Nizamabad
| Party | Candidate | Votes | % | ±% |
|---|---|---|---|---|
| TDP | Ganga Reddy Gaddam | 3,73,260 | 48.0% | |
| INC | S. Santosh Reddy | 3,69,824 | 47.5% | |
| Independent | Karnati Yadagiri | 6,312 | 0.8% | |
| Majority | | 3,436 | 0.4% | |
| Turnout | | 7,78,332 | 68.9% | |
| TDP hold | | Swing | | |

=== General election, 1998 ===
General Election, 1998: Nizamabad
| Party | Candidate | Votes | % | ±% |
|---|---|---|---|---|
| TDP | Gangareddy Gaddam | 2,81,851 | 37.8% | |
| BJP | Atmacharan Reddy Gaddam | 2,49,095 | 33.4% | |
| INC | K. Keshava Rao | 1,96,106 | 26.3% | |
| Majority | | 32,756 | 4.4% | |
| Turnout | | 7,45,538 | 65.6% | |
| TDP gain from INC | | Swing | | |

=== General election, 1996 ===
General Election, 1996: Nizamabad
| Party | Candidate | Votes | % | ±% |
|---|---|---|---|---|
| INC | Gaddam Atmacharan Reddy | 4,42,456 | 42.0% | |
| TDP | Mandawa Venkateshwara Rao | 2,49,645 | 35.7% | |
| BJP | P. Hambhant Reddy | 64,495 | 9.2% | |
| Majority | | 43,599 | 6.2% | |
| Turnout | | 6,98,512 | 61.6% | |
| INC gain from TDP | | Swing | | |

=== General election, 1991 ===
General Election, 1991: Nizamabad
| Party | Candidate | Votes | % | ±% |
|---|---|---|---|---|
| TDP | Gaddam Ganga Reddy | 2,57,297 | 43.2% | |
| INC | Tadur Bala Goud | 1,88,949 | 31.7% | |
| BJP | Loka Bhupathi Reddy | 1,07,779 | 18.1% | |
| Majority | | 43,599 | 6.2% | |
| Turnout | | 5,95,243 | 61.7% | |
| TDP gain from INC | | Swing | | |

== Trivia ==
- The Lok Sabha constituency includes two assembly constituencies from Jagtial district i.e. Koratla, Jagtial
- Candidates of Indian National Congress have won 11 out of 16 general elections from the constituency.
- In 2019 General Elections, a total of 185 candidates contested, necessitating 12 Ballot units of ECI per Polling/Voting booth, the highest ever number of Electronic Voting Machines used in a Lok Sabha Constituency, when M. R. M. Rao, IAS, District Collector, Nizamabad was the Returning Officer and District Election Officer.

== See also ==
- Nizamabad district
- List of constituencies of the Lok Sabha
- Karimnagar district
