= Aleti Annapurna Devi =

Indian politician

Member of the Andhra Pradesh Legislative Assembly
- In office 1994–1999
- Preceded by: Sanigaram Santosh Reddy
- Succeeded by: Bajireddy Goverdhan
- In office 2009–2014
- Preceded by: Sanigaram Santosh Reddy
- Succeeded by: Asannagari Jeevan Reddy

Personal details
- Party: Bharatiya Janata Party
- Other political affiliations: Telugu Desam Party

Aleti Annapurna Devi (7 May 1955) is an Indian politician from Telangana. She is a former two time member of the Andhra Pradesh Legislative Assembly from Armur Assembly constituency in Nizamabad district of the United Andhra Pradesh. She was elected in the 1994 and 2009 Andhra Pradesh Legislative Assembly election representing the Telugu Desam Party.

== Early life and education ==
Devi is from Balkonda, Nizamabad district, Telangana. She was born to late Narsareddy and late Gangavva. She is the wife of late Aleti Mahipal Reddy. She has two sons, Aleti Mallikarjun Reddy and Aleti Nagarjuna Reddy. She studied Class 10 at ZPHS Velpoor, Nizamabad district, and passed the examinations in the year 1969. Later, she discontinued her studies.

== Career ==
Devi was elected as an MLA for the first in the Armur Assembly constituency representing the Telugu Desam Party in the 1994 Andhra Pradesh Legislative Assembly election. After two more elections, she regained the seat for the Telugu Desam Party winning the 2009 Andhra Pradesh Legislative Assembly election. In 2009, she polled 49,009 votes and defeated her nearest rival, K. R. Suresh Reddy of the Indian National Congress, by a margin of 13,059 votes.

In November 2019, she resigned from the Telugu Desam Party. Later, she joined the Bharatiya Janata Party and was nominated to contest the Balkonda seat in the 2023 Telangana Legislative Assembly election on a BJP ticket. She finished third behind winner Vemula Prashanth Reddy of the Bharath Rashtra Samithi and second-placed Congress candidate Muthyala Sunil Kumar.
