= Bigala Ganesh =

Indian politician (born 1969)

Bigala Ganesh Gupta (born 1969) is an Indian politician from Telangana. He is a member of Telangana Legislative Assembly from Nizamabad Urban constituency of Nizamabad district in the 2018 Telangana Legislative Assembly election representing the BRS party.

He is from Nizamabad district and his father name is Krishna Murthy Bigala. He did his Bachelor of engineering in 1996 from Gulbarga University.

He won In 2014,on TRS ticket with a margin of 10,308 (7.62%). He secured 31.15% of the total votes polled and retained the seat for BRS in 2018. He lost the seat to Dhanpal Suryanarayana Gupta of the BJP, who defeated Congress candidate Mohammed Ali Shabbir and finished third.
