= Asannagari Jeevan Reddy =

Indian politician

A. Jeevan Reddy
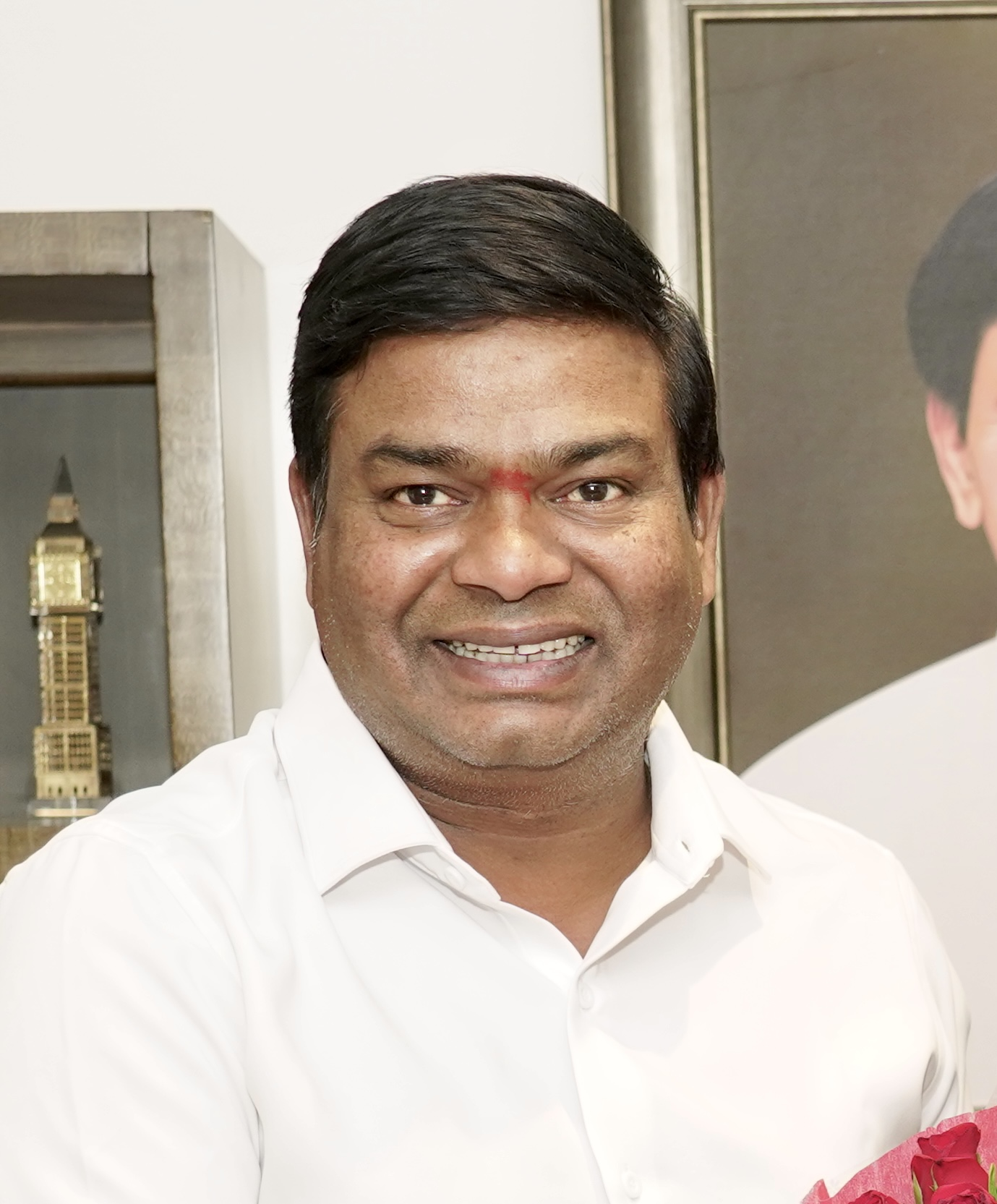
- Jeevan Reddy

Member of Legislative Assembly, Telangana
- In office 2 June 2014 – 3 December 2023
- Chief Minister: K. Chandrashekar Rao
- Preceded by: Aleti Annapurna Devi
- Succeeded by: Paidi Rakesh Reddy
- Constituency: Armur

Personal details
- Born: 7 March 1976 (age 50) Jankampet
- Party: Telangana Rashtra Samithi
- Education: Osmania University
- Profession: Politician lawyer businessman social worker

Asannagari Jeevan Reddy (born 7 March 1976) is an Indian politician and a Member of the Legislative Assembly from Armur, Telangana. He won the 2014 Indian general election on Telangana Rashtra Samithi ticket from Armur.

He was the first declared MLA candidate for the Telangana Rashtra Samithi in the Indian general election on 13 May 2014,during which, Telangana Rashtra Samithi went on to win its highest number of seats in the Legislative Assembly of the newly formed state Telangana and thereby formed the government.

== Early life ==
Jeevan Reddy was born into a middle-class agricultural family with political background in Jankampet village of Nizamabad district of Telangana. He graduated from Osmania University with L.L.B. He is also a member of the Bar Council of Nizamabad. His uncle, late Yalla Ramulu was M. P. P. in Armur, Nizamabad district (Congress).

== Political career ==
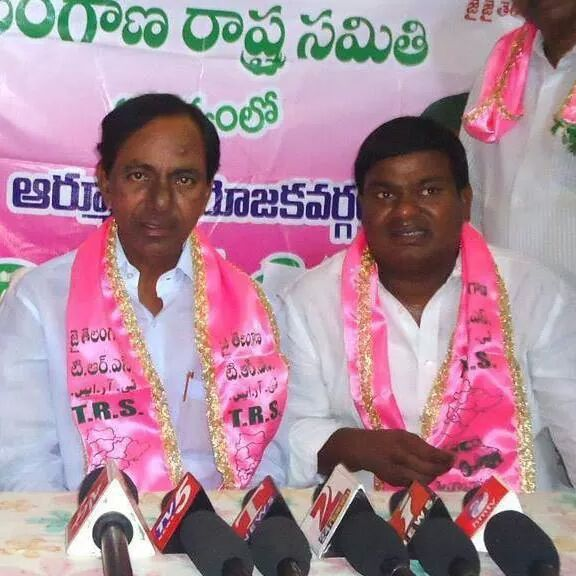
Jeevan Reddy being announced as Armur MLA candidate by Kalvakuntla Chandrashekar Rao

For the 2014 Indian general election, Jeevan Reddy was announced as the first Telangana Rashtra Samithi MLA Candidate from Armur. Jeevan Reddy won with a majority of around 13,000 votes over K. R. Suresh Reddy of Indian National Congress and the party went on to form its first Government by winning 63 of the 119 seats under the leadership of Chief Minister of Telangana Kalvakuntla Chandrashekar Rao.

He was part of a five-member delegation to Singapore and Malaysia; the first ever foreign visit of Chief Minister of Telangana Kalvakuntla Chandrashekar Rao, Telangana Finance Minister Etela Rajender and other MLAs. He also visited Tiruvanantpuram District, Kerala, to study the organisational structure of ISO-certified gram panchayats with K. T. Rama Rao, and has also taken part with the party leaders in Delhi during the parliamentary introduction of Telangana.

He is a speaker on behalf of the Telangana Rashtra Samithi and has attended debates and live discussions on many popular news channels to speak on behalf of the Telangana Government.

== Constituency development ==
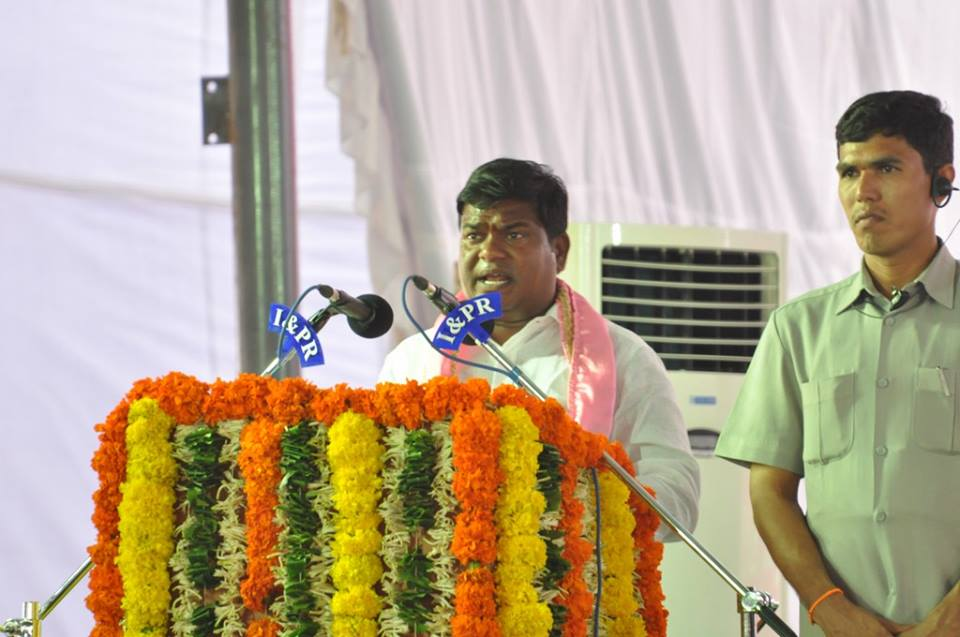
Jeevan Reddy speaking at the inauguration of drinking water project at Armur by Kalvakuntla Chandrashekar Rao

Reddy was the first MLA in Telangana and among most Indian states to implement a 24/7 toll-free number for the people of his constituency, and he keeps in touch with his constituents through various social networking media. 3 months after coming to power, he had started a drinking water project from Pochampadu to Armur as promised by him during his election campaign, and it was inaugurated by Chief Minister Kalvakuntla Chandrashekar Rao. He brought into action the government sanction of ₹115 million for red jowar farmers, which had been pending for more than a decade. During his term, Armur was marked as a revenue division of Nizamabad district.

Six months into his tenure, he took responsibility for a range of development programs in his constituency, including a drinking water pipeline worth ₹4 billion inaugurated by Chief Minister of Telangana, KCR, on his visit to the constituency.

Furthermore he established separate community halls for the people of the13 different castes, made efforts to provide fishermen with two-wheelers to the local fishermen, and hostel students with rice midday meals.

Sanction of bridge above Godavari River connecting Nizamabad district's Nandipet Mandal of Armur with Adilabad district worth Rs. 900 million which is on demand for more than 4 decades now has been fulfilled by him. Sanction of Rs. 115 million due for more than a decade to red jowar farmers from previous governments, sanction of 100-bed hospital to Armur, encouraging establishment of several shopping malls and restaurants in his constituency as a part of urbanisation and so on.

Chief Minister of Telangana, Kalvakuntla Chandrashekar Rao has visited Ankapur Village of Armur constituency, his first-ever visit to any village after forming the Government. Ankapur which is a model village for agriculture has several specialities like Country Chicken and has esteemed agriculture families growing Turmeric and Tobacco. He has made many significant contributions for the development of this village and make it useful to other villages by implementation of advanced techniques including usage of drones in vast stretches of agricultural land to study the nature of the soil and its fertility.

== In the media ==
Jeevan Reddy is popular in the media. He takes part in News debates on almost all of Telangana's popular channels, like T News, V6 News, TV 9, TV 5, N TV, Sakshi TV, HMTV etc. He mostly appears in the early-morning shows between 7 am to 9 am.
