= Banswada Assembly constituency =

Constituency of the Telangana legislative assembly in India

Coordinates: 18.38°N 77.88°E

Banswada
- Constituency No. 14 for the Telangana Legislative Assembly
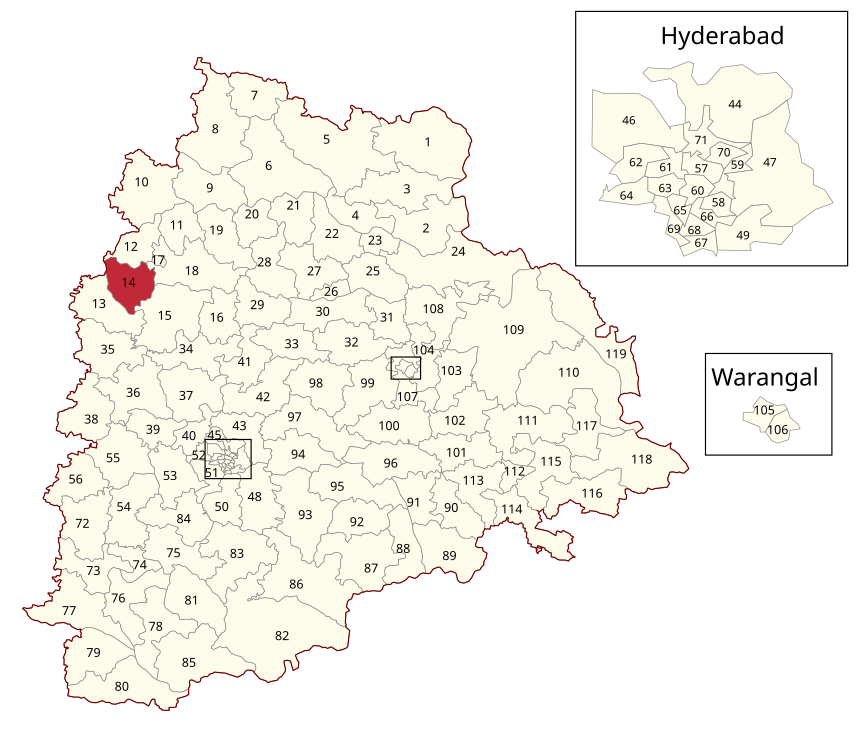
- Location of Banswada Assembly constituency within Telangana

Constituency details
- Country: India
- Region: South India
- State: Telangana
- District: Kamareddy
- Lok Sabha constituency: Zahirabad
- Established: 1951
- Total electors: 1,50,444
- Reservation: None

Member of Legislative Assembly
- 3rd Telangana Legislative Assembly
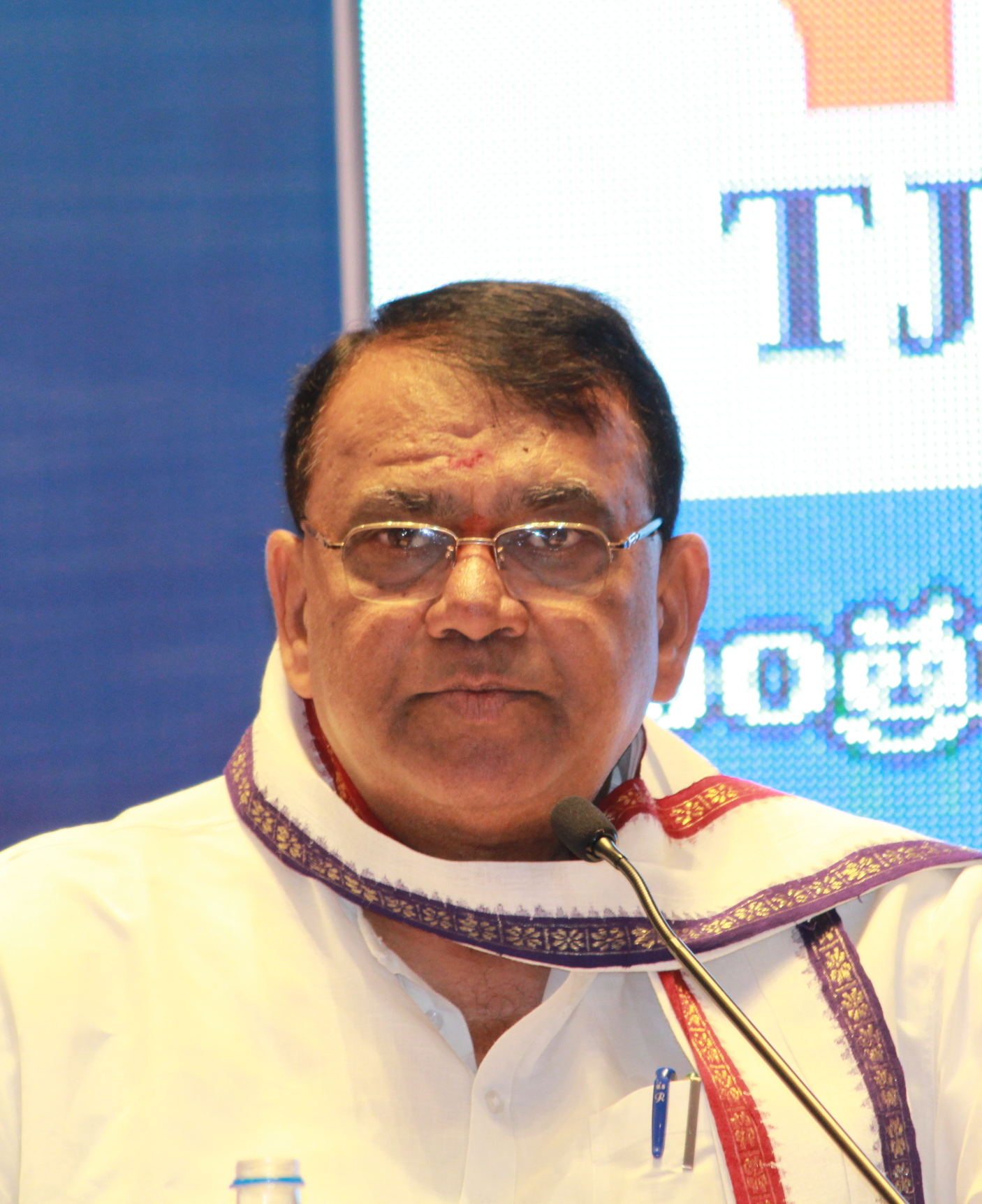
- Incumbent Pocharam Srinivas Reddy
- Party: Indian National Congress

Banswada Assembly constituency is a constituency of the Telangana Legislative Assembly, India. It is one of the constituencies of Telangana with nine mandals, out of which six are in Nizamabad district and the other three in Kamareddy district. It is part of Zahirabad Lok Sabha constituency.

Pocharam Srinivas Reddy of Indian National Congress is currently representing the constituency.

== Mandals ==
The assembly constituency presently comprises the following mandals:

Mandal	District
Banswada	Kamareddy district
Birkoor	Kamareddy district
Nasrullabad	Kamareddy district
Varni	Nizamabad district
Kotgiri	Nizamabad district
Rudrur	Nizamabad district
Chandur	Nizamabad district
Mosra	Nizamabad district
Pothangal	Nizamabad district

== Members of the Legislative Assembly ==
Year	Member	Political party
1952	Sangam Laxmi Bai	Indian National Congress
1957	Seetakumari	Indian National Congress
1962	Sreenivasa Reddy	Indian National Congress
1967	M. Sreenivasa Rao	Indian National Congress
1972	M. Sreenivasa Rao	Indian National Congress
1978	M. Sreenivasa Rao	Indian National Congress
1983	Kishan Singh	Telugu Desam Party
1985	Suryadevara Venkata	Telugu Desam Party
1989	Kathera Gangadhar	Telugu Desam Party
1994	Pocharam Srinivas Reddy	Telugu Desam Party
1999	Pocharam Srinivas Reddy	Telugu Desam Party
2004	Bajireddy Goverdhan	Indian National Congress
2009	Pocharam Srinivas Reddy	Telugu Desam Party
2011^	Pocharam Srinivas Reddy	Telangana Rashtra Samithi
2014	Pocharam Srinivas Reddy	Telangana Rashtra Samithi
2018	Pocharam Srinivas Reddy	Telangana Rashtra Samithi
2023	Pocharam Srinivas Reddy	Bharat Rashtra Samithi

Hyderabad State
Andhra Pradesh

== Election results ==
=== Assembly Election 2023 ===
2023 Telangana Legislative Assembly election : Banswada
Party	Candidate	Votes	%	±%
BRS	Pocharam Srinivas Reddy	76,278	47.65%	New
INC	Eanugu Ravinder Reddy	52,814	32.99%	▼8.23
BJP	Laxmi Narayana Yendala	23,685	14.80%	▲12.72
Independent	Putta Bhaskar	3,671	2.29%	New
BSP	Neeradi Eshwar	1,435	0.90%	▲0.30
NOTA	None of the above	1,012	0.63%	▼0.45
Margin of victory		23,464	14.66%	▲1.84
Turnout		160,146	81.96%	▼2.18
Total valid votes		160,079		
Registered electors		195,384		▲12.71
BRS gain from BRS		Swing	▼6.39	

=== Assembly Election 2018 ===
2018 Telangana Legislative Assembly election : Banswada
Party	Candidate	Votes	%	±%
BRS	Pocharam Srinivas Reddy	77,943	54.04%	▲5.90
INC	Balaraju Kasula	59,458	41.22%	▲10.57
BJP	Prakash Naidu	2,998	2.08%	New
Pyramid Party of India	Kondani Anjaiah	2,409	1.67%	▲0.98
NOTA	None of the above	1,555	1.08%	▲0.12
BSP	Dr. Bheem Rao Gaikwad	871	0.60%	▼2.24
Margin of victory		18,485	12.82%	▼4.67
Turnout		145,870	84.14%	▲6.77
Total valid votes		144,242		
Registered electors		173,356		▼3.41
BRS hold		Swing	▲5.90	

=== Assembly Election 2014 ===
2014 Telangana Legislative Assembly election : Banswada
Party	Candidate	Votes	%	±%
BRS	Pocharam Srinivas Reddy	65,868	48.14%	▼19.61
INC	Balaraju Kasula	41,938	30.65%	▲3.50
TDP	Badya Naik Rathod	19,692	14.39%	New
BSP	Narahari Gangaram	3,890	2.84%	New
Independent	Ramesh Chandra Benarji Kaki	2,861	2.09%	New
NOTA	None of the above	1,316	0.96%	New
Pyramid Party of India	Kondani Anjaiah	944	0.69%	New
Margin of victory		23,930	17.49%	▼23.11
Turnout		138,854	77.37%	▲0.45
Total valid votes		136,835		
Registered electors		179,477		▲12.36
BRS hold		Swing	▼19.61	

=== Assembly By-election 2011 ===
2011 Andhra Pradesh Legislative Assembly by-election : Banswada
Party	Candidate	Votes	%	±%
BRS	Pocharam Srinivas Reddy	83,245	67.75%	New
INC	S. G. Sangem	33,356	27.15%	▼6.97
Independent	S. K. Venigalla	2,840	2.31%	New
Independent	Bhaskar Jajula	1,313	1.07%	New
MTP	Giridhar. R	1,273	1.04%	New
Independent	K. Chandraiah	844	0.69%	New
Margin of victory		49,889	40.60%	▲20.25
Turnout		122,871	76.92%	▼2.46
Total valid votes		122,871		
Registered electors		159,732		▼1.24
BRS gain from TDP		Swing	▲13.28	

=== Assembly Election 2009 ===
2009 Andhra Pradesh Legislative Assembly election : Banswada
Party	Candidate	Votes	%	±%
TDP	Pocharam Srinivas Reddy	69,857	54.47%	▲13.51
INC	Bajireddy Goverdhan	43,754	34.12%	▼17.06
PRP	Balaraj Kasulawar	6,347	4.95%	New
BJP	Mohan Reddy Ryala	2,671	2.08%	New
Independent	Avusali Gangadhar	1,624	1.27%	New
BSP	Nagaiah Macharla	1,490	1.16%	▼5.03
LSP	K. Geetha Murthy	1,300	1.01%	New
Pyramid Party of India	Bejugam Shanker	1,211	0.94%	New
Margin of victory		26,103	20.35%	▲10.13
Turnout		128,382	79.38%	▲4.20
Total valid votes		128,254		
Registered electors		161,732		▲0.64
TDP gain from INC		Swing	▲3.29	

=== Assembly Election 2004 ===
2004 Andhra Pradesh Legislative Assembly election : Banswada
Party	Candidate	Votes	%	±%
INC	Bajireddy Goverdhan	61,819	51.18%	▲15.57
TDP	Srinivas Reddy Parige (Pocharam)	49,471	40.96%	▼22.52
BSP	N. Gangaram	7,481	6.19%	New
Independent	Rajaram Kateke	2,171	1.80%	New
Margin of victory		12,348	10.22%	▼17.65
Turnout		120,814	75.18%	▲0.44
Total valid votes		120,783		
Rejected ballots		31	0.03%	▼2.98
Registered electors		160,708		▲2.46
INC gain from TDP		Swing	▼12.30	

=== Assembly Election 1999 ===
1999 Andhra Pradesh Legislative Assembly election : Banswada
Party	Candidate	Votes	%	±%
TDP	Pocharam Srinivas Reddy	72,179	63.48%	▼11.08
INC	Kishan Singh	40,495	35.61%	▲16.35
Margin of victory		31,684	27.87%	▼27.42
Turnout		117,233	74.74%	▼0.84
Total valid votes		113,704		
Rejected ballots		3,529	3.01%	▲0.62
Registered electors		156,857		▲11.33
TDP hold		Swing	▼11.08	

=== Assembly Election 1994 ===
1994 Andhra Pradesh Legislative Assembly election : Banswada
Party	Candidate	Votes	%	±%
TDP	Pocharam Srinivas Reddy	77,495	74.56%	▲29.57
INC	Srimathi Beena Devi	20,023	19.26%	▼23.25
BJP	Sridhar Raju Saksena	4,675	4.50%	New
Independent	S. V. L. Narasimha Rao	1,042	1.00%	New
BSP	M. A. Razzak	701	0.67%	New
Margin of victory		57,472	55.29%	▲52.81
Turnout		106,485	75.58%	▼0.56
Total valid votes		103,943		
Rejected ballots		2,542	2.39%	▼2.84
Registered electors		140,891		▲3.06
TDP hold		Swing	▲29.57	

=== Assembly Election 1989 ===
1989 Andhra Pradesh Legislative Assembly election : Banswada
Party	Candidate	Votes	%	±%
TDP	Kathera Gangadhar	44,377	44.99%	▼9.05
INC	Reddygari Venkatarama Reddy	41,934	42.51%	▼0.58
AIMIM	Shaik Mahboob	10,031	10.17%	New
Independent	Nalla Laxman	719	0.73%	New
Margin of victory		2,443	2.48%	▼8.47
Turnout		104,092	76.14%	▲2.25
Total valid votes		98,646		
Rejected ballots		5,446	5.23%	▲3.43
Registered electors		136,711		▲19.37
TDP hold		Swing	▼9.05	

=== Assembly Election 1985 ===
1985 Andhra Pradesh Legislative Assembly election : Banswada
Party	Candidate	Votes	%	±%
TDP	Suryadevara Venkata	44,904	54.04%	New
INC	Venkatarama Reddy	35,804	43.09%	▲9.58
Independent	Yadav Bosu Babu	1,029	1.24%	New
Independent	Veeragandham Venkateshwara Rao	777	0.94%	New
Margin of victory		9,100	10.95%	▼5.34
Turnout		84,620	73.89%	▼0.16
Total valid votes		83,095		
Rejected ballots		1,525	1.80%	▼0.63
Registered electors		114,528		▲13.37
TDP gain from Independent		Swing	▲4.24	

=== Assembly Election 1983 ===
1983 Andhra Pradesh Legislative Assembly election : Banswada
Party	Candidate	Votes	%	±%
Independent	Kishan Singh	36,346	49.80%	New
INC	M. Sreenivasa Rao	24,459	33.51%	▲20.67
Independent	Ailapuram Narendera Reddy	10,425	14.28%	New
Independent	Dowulaiah	1,752	2.40%	New
Margin of victory		11,887	16.29%	▼10.69
Turnout		74,803	74.05%	▼3.39
Total valid votes		72,982		
Rejected ballots		1,821	2.43%	▼1.45
Registered electors		101,023		▲5.45
Independent gain from INC(I)		Swing	▲6.08	

=== Assembly Election 1978 ===
1978 Andhra Pradesh Legislative Assembly election : Banswada
Party	Candidate	Votes	%	±%
INC(I)	M. Sreenivasa Rao	31,178	43.72%	New
Independent	Narayan Rao Jadav	11,940	16.74%	New
JP	S. Vithal Reddy	10,880	15.26%	New
INC	Balarajiah Nagulagama	9,154	12.84%	▼23.94
Independent	S. V. L. Narasimha Rao	3,169	4.44%	New
Independent	Chandra Bhanu	3,094	4.34%	New
Independent	Bheem Rao	1,653	2.32%	New
Margin of victory		19,238	26.98%	▲22.28
Turnout		74,190	77.44%	▲10.85
Total valid votes		71,308		
Rejected ballots		2,882	3.88%	▲3.88
Registered electors		95,805		▲11.31
INC(I) gain from INC		Swing	▲6.94	

=== Assembly Election 1972 ===
1972 Andhra Pradesh Legislative Assembly election : Banswada
Party	Candidate	Votes	%	±%
INC	M. Sreenivasa Rao	20,279	36.78%	▼19.54
Independent	Rajaiah	17,687	32.08%	New
Independent	Saya Goud	15,195	27.56%	New
Independent	Gangaram Tammala	1,975	3.58%	New
Margin of victory		2,592	4.70%	▼16.22
Turnout		57,317	66.59%	▲2.30
Total valid votes		55,136		
Registered electors		86,071		▲20.67
INC hold		Swing	▼19.54	

=== Assembly Election 1967 ===
1967 Andhra Pradesh Legislative Assembly election : Banswada
Party	Candidate	Votes	%	±%
INC	M. Sreenivasa Rao	24,198	56.32%	▲2.52
Independent	K. L. N. Goud	15,208	35.40%	New
Independent	K. Baswayya	3,560	8.29%	New
Margin of victory		8,990	20.92%	▲13.33
Turnout		45,856	64.29%	▲1.17
Total valid votes		42,966		
Registered electors		71,330		▲8.26
INC hold		Swing	▲2.52	

=== Assembly Election 1962 ===
1962 Andhra Pradesh Legislative Assembly election : Banswada
Party	Candidate	Votes	%	±%
INC	Sreenivasa Reddy	21,418	53.80%	New
Independent	Narla Rajiah	18,395	46.20%	New
Margin of victory		3,023	7.59%	
Turnout		41,591	63.12%	
Total valid votes		39,813		
Registered electors		65,890		
INC hold		Swing		

=== Assembly Election 1957 ===
1957 Andhra Pradesh Legislative Assembly election : Banswada
Party	Candidate	Votes	%	±%
INC	Seetakumari	Unopposed		
Registered electors		60,014		▲34.97
INC hold		Swing		

=== Assembly Election 1952 ===
1952 Hyderabad State Legislative Assembly election : Banswada
Party	Candidate	Votes	%	±%
INC	Sangam Laxmi Bai	14,667	58.89%	New
Independent	Kishan Rao	10,238	41.11%	New
Margin of victory		4,429	17.78%	
Turnout		24,905	56.01%	
Total valid votes		24,905		
Registered electors		44,464		
INC win (new seat)				

== See also ==
- List of constituencies of Telangana Legislative Assembly
