= Pocharam Srinivas Reddy =

Indian politician

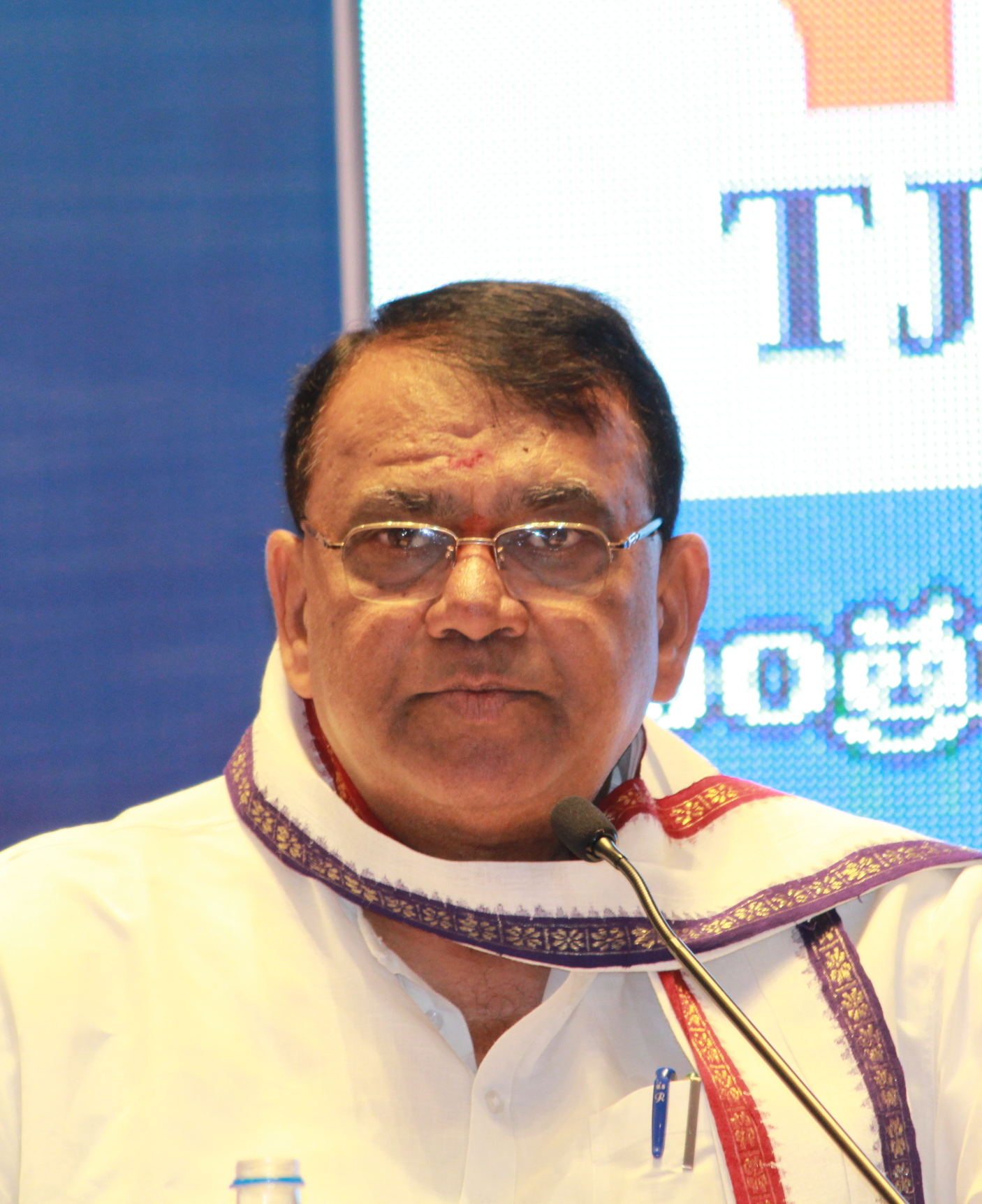

2nd Speaker of Telangana Legislative Assembly
- In office 18 January 2019 – 09 December 2023
- Governor: E. S. L. Narasimhan; Dr. Tamilisai Soundararajan
- Deputy: T. Padma Rao Goud
- Chief Minister: K. Chandrashekar Rao
- Preceded by: S. Madhusudhana Chary, TRS
- Succeeded by: Gaddam Prasad Kumar, INC

Minister for Agriculture, Horticulture, Sericulture, Animal Husbandry, Fisheries, Dairy Development Corporation and Seeds Corporation Government of Telangana
- In office 2 June 2014 – 6 September 2018
- Governor: E. S. L. Narasimhan
- Chief Minister: K. Chandrashekar Rao
- Preceded by: Position Established
- Succeeded by: Singireddy Niranjan Reddy

Member of Legislative Assembly, Telangana
- Incumbent
- Assumed office 2 June 2014
- Preceded by: Telangana Assembly Created
- Constituency: Banswada

Minister of Panchayat Raj Government of Andhra Pradesh
- In office 1999–2002
- Governor: Dr. C. Rangarajan
- Chief Minister: N. Chandrababu Naidu
- Preceded by: Alimineti Madhava Reddy
- Succeeded by: Kodela Siva Prasada Rao

Minister for Mines and Geology Government of Andhra Pradesh
- In office 1998–1999
- Governor: Dr. C. Rangarajan
- Chief Minister: N. Chandrababu Naidu
- Preceded by: Koppula Harishwar Reddy
- Succeeded by: Uma Madhava Reddy

Member of Legislative Assembly Andhra Pradesh
- In office 2009–2014
- Preceded by: Bajireddy Goverdhan
- Succeeded by: Telangana Assembly Created
- Constituency: Banswada
- In office 1994–2004
- Preceded by: Kathera Gangadhar
- Succeeded by: Bajireddy Goverdhan
- Constituency: Banswada

Personal details
- Born: 10 February 1949 (age 77) Banswada, Andhra Pradesh (present–day Telangana), India
- Party: Indian National Congress (until 1984; 2024–present)
- Other political affiliations: Bharat Rashtra Samithi (2011–2024); Telugu Desam Party (1984–2011)

Pocharam Srinivas Reddy is an Indian politician and a Member of Legislative assembly representing Banswada constituency in the Telangana legislative assembly. He previously served as the Speaker of the Telangana Legislative Assembly from 2019 to 2023. He was the Minister of Agriculture (2014–2019) in the government of Telangana.

Pocharam Srinivas Reddy served as Speaker of Telangana Legislative Assembly from 2019 January 17 to 2023 December 6.

== Career ==
Reddy joined the Telugu Desam Party (TDP) in 1984 from the Indian National Congress (INC). He worked as a minister twice in TDP government. He was with TDP for 27 years before quitting.

In 1994, he contested the Banswada constituency as a TDP candidate and won with a majority of over 57,000 votes. He lost in 2004 against Bajireddy Goverdhan, the INC candidate. In support of the Telangana Movement, he joined TRS party in March 2011. He also resigned from his MLA seat and TDP membership. He went on to contest that year's by-elections and won with a margin of over 49,000 votes against INC candidate, Sangam Srinivasgoud. He was made a Politburo member of the TRS on 24 March 2011.

In 2014 Telangana Assembly Election he was re-elected from Banswada Assembly constituency. He was inducted into Cabinet on 2 June 2014 and made Agriculture Minister of Telangana.

In Telangana Legislative Assembly election, 2018, he was re-elected from Banswada Assembly constituency. Subsequently, he was elected as the speaker of the Telangana Legislative Assembly.

== Electroral History ==
| Year | Constituency | Party | Votes | % | Opponent | Party | Votes | % | Result | Margin | % |
|---|---|---|---|---|---|---|---|---|---|---|---|
| 1989 | Nizamabad (MP) | TDP | 2,64,164 | 39.14 | Taduri Bala Goud | INC | 2,88,263 | 42.71 | Lost | -24,099 | -3.57 |
| 1994 | Banswada | TDP | 81,592 | 62.06 | Beena Devi | INC | 24,120 | 18.35 | Won | +57,472 | +43.71 |
| 1999 | Banswada | TDP | 71,982 | 59.88 | Kishan Singh | INC | 40,298 | 33.52 | Won | +31,684 | +26.36 |
| 2004 | Banswada | TDP | 45,775 | 35.80 | Bajireddy Goverdhan | INC | 58,123 | 45.46 | Lost | -12,348 | -9.66 |
| 2009 | Banswada | TDP | 69,857 | 54.47 | Bajireddy Goverdhan | INC | 43,754 | 34.12 | Won | +26,103 | +20.35 |
| 2011 (Note: By-election) | Banswada | TRS | 83,245 | 67.75 | Sangem Srinivas Goud | INC | 33,356 | 27.15 | Won | +49,889 | +40.60 |
| 2014 | Banswada | TRS | 65,868 | 47.68 | Balaraju Kasula | INC | 41,938 | 30.36 | Won | +23,930 | +17.32 |
| 2018 | Banswada | TRS | 77,943 | 53.46 | Kasula Balaraju | INC | 59,458 | 40.78 | Won | +18,485 | +12.68 |
| 2023 | Banswada | BRS | 76,278 | 47.65 | Eanugu Ravinder Reddy | INC | 52,814 | 32.99 | Won | +23,464 | +14.66 |

== Personal life ==
He was married to Pushpa and has 4 children: Ravinder Reddy, Surendar Reddy, Aruna and Bhasker Reddy.
