= Bajireddy Goverdhan =

Indian politician (born 1954)

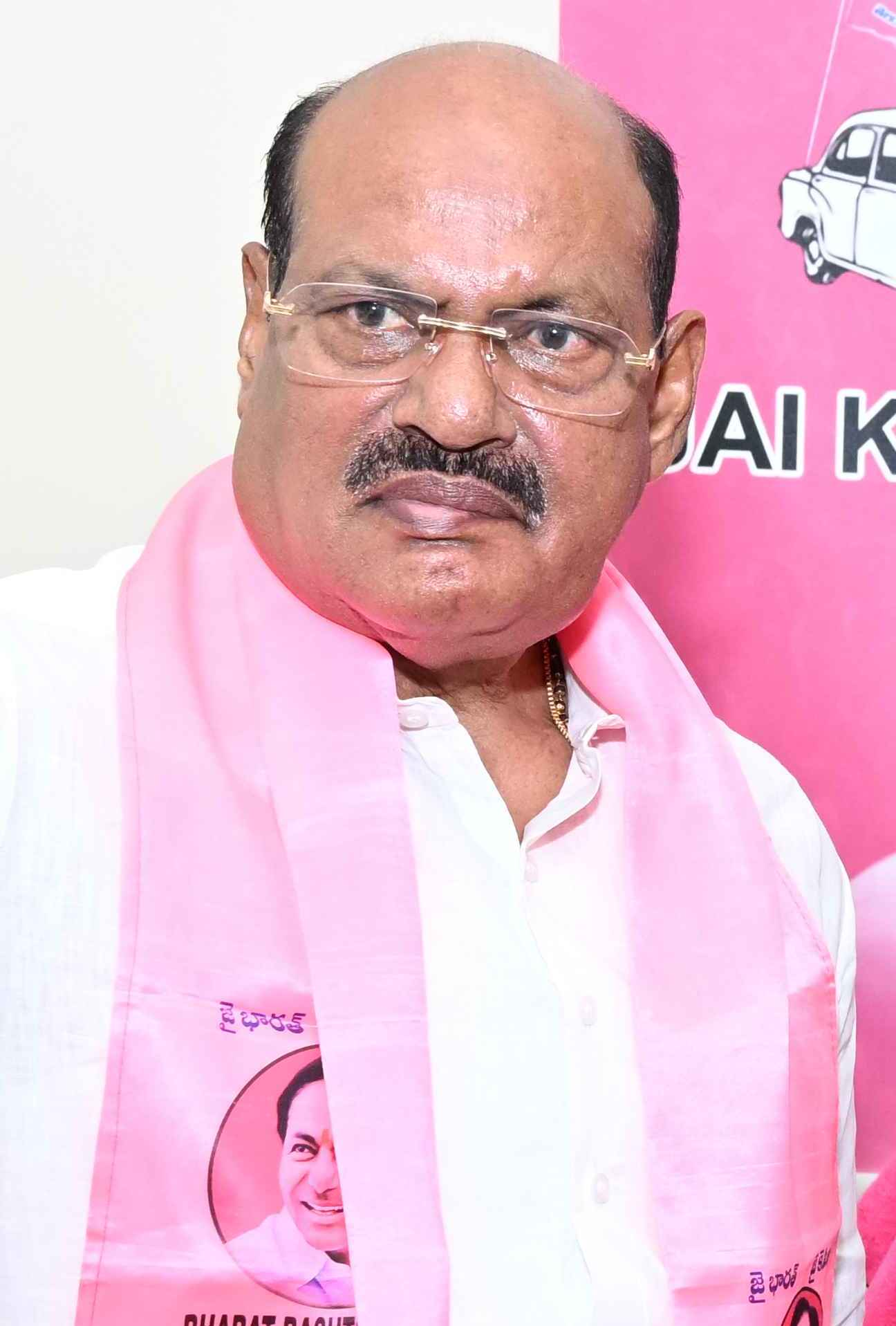

Chairman Telangana State Road Transport Corporation (TSRTC)
- In office 16 September 2021 – 06 October 2023
- Preceded by: Somarapu Satyananarayana
- Succeeded by: T. Rajaiah

Member of Legislative Assembly, Telangana
- In office 2014 – 3 December 2023
- Preceded by: Telangana Legislative Assembly – created
- Succeeded by: Rekulapally Bhoopathi Reddy
- Constituency: Nizamabad Rural

Member of Legislative Assembly Andhra Pradesh
- In office 2004–2009
- Preceded by: Pocharam Srinivas Reddy
- Succeeded by: Pocharam Srinivas Reddy
- Constituency: Banswada
- In office 1999–2004
- Preceded by: Aleti Annapurna Devi
- Succeeded by: Sanigaram Santosh Reddy
- Constituency: Armur

Personal details
- Born: 17 February 1954 (age 72) Desaipet, Jagityal Dist., Telangana, India
- Party: Bharat Rashtra Samithi; (2014–present)
- Other political affiliations: Indian National Congress; (1999–2014)
- Spouse(s): Vinodha, Shobha (died)
- Children: 3 (Bajireddy Jagan Mohan, Bajireddy Ajay, Motati Dharani)
- Education: B.A from Dr. B.R. Ambedkar Open University
- Occupation: Politician

Bajireddy Goverdhan (born 8 December 1954) is an Indian politician from Telangana. He has won four terms as an MLA once from Banswada Assembly constituency & once from Armur in the united state of Andhra Pradesh and twice from Nizamabad Rural Assembly constituency after the formation of Telangana State.

He Served as Chairman of the Telangana State Road Transport Corporation (TSRTC) 16 September 2021 from to 6 October 2023.

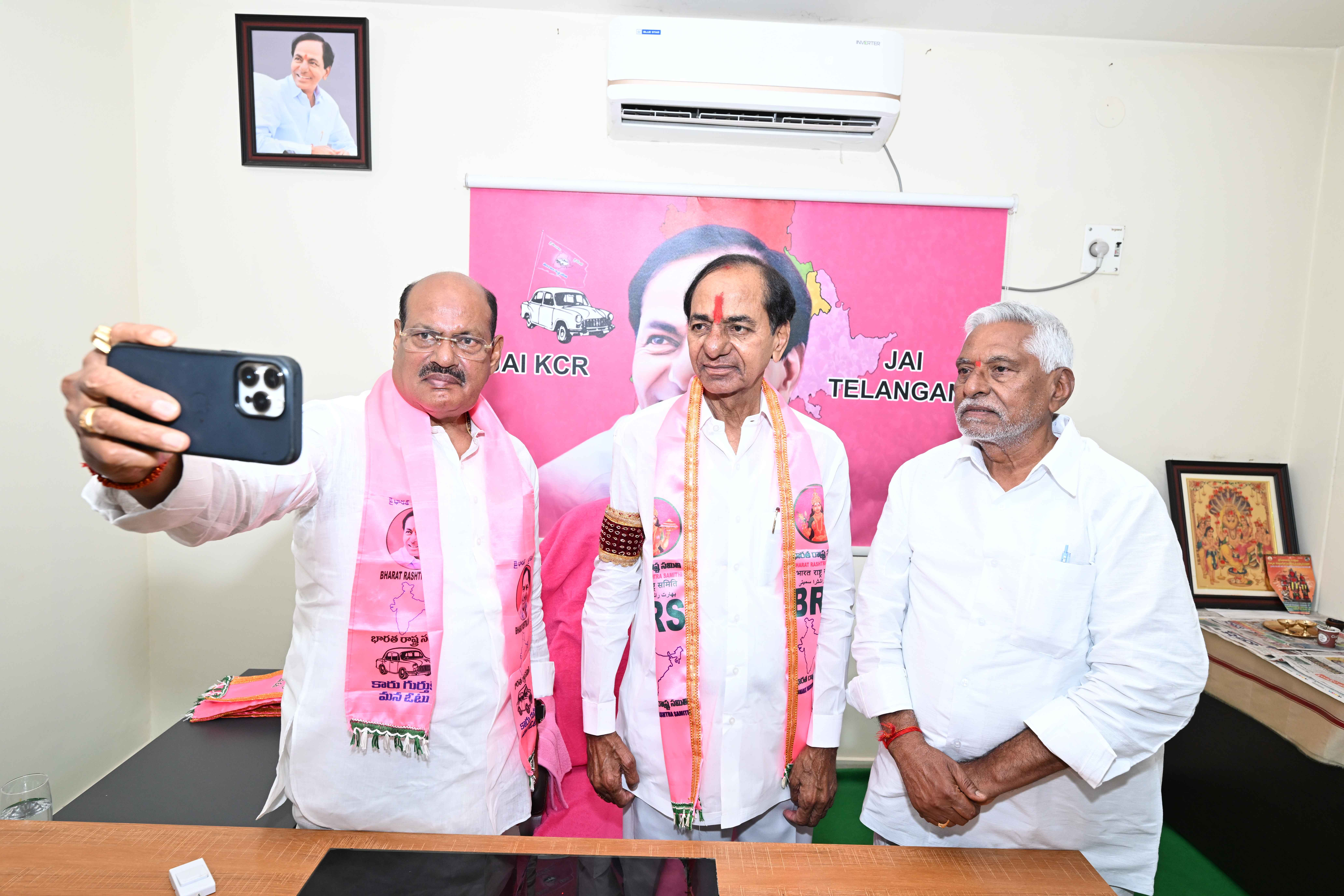
Bajireddy Govardhan Reddy taking a selfie with KCR and T. Jeevan Reddy on 20 April 2026 in Jagtial

== Electoral history ==
Election Year	Office for	Constituency	Party Affiliation	Result	Nearest Rival & Party	
1994	MLA	Armur	Independent politician	Lost	Aleti Annapurna Devi	Telugu Desam Party
1999	MLA	Armur	Independent politician	Won	Aleti Annapurna Devi	Telugu Desam Party
2004	MLA	Banswada	Indian National Congress	Won	Pocharam Srinivas Reddy	Telugu Desam Party
2009	MLA	Banswada	Indian National Congress	Lost	Pocharam Srinivas Reddy	Telugu Desam Party
2014	MLA	Nizamabad Rural	Telangana Rashtra Samithi	Won	D. Srinivas	Indian National Congress
2018	MLA	Nizamabad Rural	Telangana Rashtra Samithi	Won	Rekulapally Bhoopathi Reddy	Indian National Congress
2023	MLA	Nizamabad Rural	Telangana Rashtra Samithi	Lost	Rekulapally Bhoopathi Reddy	Indian National Congress
2024	Lok Sabha	Nizamabad	Telangana Rashtra Samithi	Lost	Dharmapuri Arvind	Bharatiya Janata Party
