= Harish Chandra Heda =

Indian politician

Member of Parliament
- In office 1952–1967
- Preceded by: Constituency established
- Succeeded by: M. Narayana Reddy
- Constituency: Nizamabad

Personal details
- Born: 14 October 1912 Shiradhon, Osmanabad, Hyderabad State (present-day Maharashtra, India)
- Died: 28 August 2002 (aged 89) Hyderabad, Andhra Pradesh, India
- Party: Indian National Congress
- Spouse: Gyan Kumari
- Children: 1
- Occupation: Politician

Harish Chandra Heda (14 October 1912 – 28 August 2002) was an Indian activist and politician. A political activist during his student days, he was one of the founders of the Hyderabad unit of Indian National Congress in 1930. As politician, he represented Nizamabad in the parliament for three terms, between 1952 and 1967.
