= Endela Lakshminarayana =

Indian politician

Yendala Laxminarayana
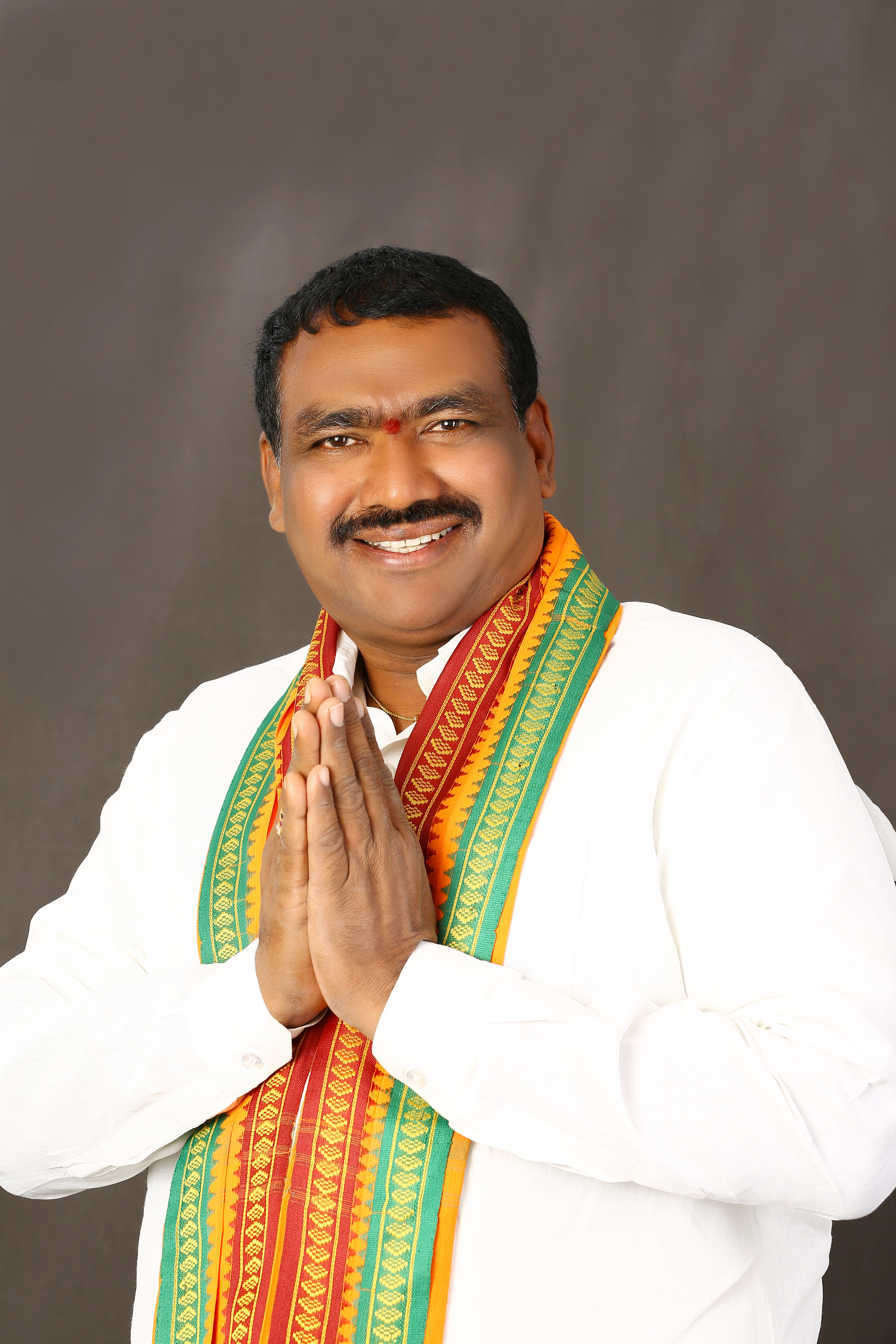
- Yendala Laxminarayana

MLA
- In office 2009–2014
- Constituency: Nizamabad Urban

Personal details
- Born: 1 March 1963 (age 63) Nizamabad
- Party: BJP
- Website: Official site

Yendala Laxminarayana (born 1 March 1963) currently serving as a BJP State vice president and he was the state Bharatiya Janata Party Assembly Floor Leader of Andhra Pradesh, India. He is a member of the Bharatiya Janata Party (BJP). He was the member of the legislative assembly representing Nizamabad Urban (Vidhan Sabha constituency) assembly segment.

== Early life ==
- Father's Name: Yendala Chinnaiah
- Educational qualifications: B.A.
- Profession: Agriculture
- Caste: B.C. (Munnuru Kapu)
- Year joined politics: 1982
- Family background: Agriculture

== Political career ==
Yendala started his career as a youth leader in late twentieth century. He was elected as an MLA from Nizamabad urban constituency in 2009 and resigned in 2010 for supporting Telangana Movement. He was elected again in 2010 with a majority on PCC President D. Srinivas (politician). He was unanimously elected as the assembly floor leader of BJP.

- Political party: Bharatiya Janata Party
- BJP District President (2001), State Executive member in 2006.
- Served as BJP State Vice President (2010).
- Participated in agitations against the government policy of privatization of Nizamabad Co-op Sugar Factory & Nizam Sugar Factory, Bodhan.
- Worked for the betterment of lives of Beedi Rollers of Nizamabad.
- Worked for the early release of funds for broad gauge conversion in Nizamabad.
- Participated in agitations against the construction of Babli dam by the Maharastra Govt. and also for the release of Singur waters.
- Elected as Member of Legislative Assembly from 017-Nizamabad Urban Assembly Constituency in 2009 general elections against D. Srinivas with 11,000 + majority votes.
- Participated in Telangana Agitation and resigned from the seat of MLA on 14.02.2010 as per the decision of JAC, required for the formation of separate Telangana state.
- Elected as MLA from Nzb urban constituency in by-elections 2010 by defeating D. Srinivas with 12,000+ majority votes for the second time.
- Elected as BJP Assembly Floor Leader (2010).
- Contested from Nizamabad Parliament as a BJP candidate in 2014 and gained 2.5lac votes.
- Contested from Nizamabad Urban Assembly Constituency as a BJP candidate and lost.

== Election History ==
=== Lok Sabha ===
Year	Constituency	Party	Votes	%	Opponent	Party	Votes	%	Result	Margin	%
2014	Nizamabad	BJP	2,25,333	21.79	K. Kavitha	TRS	4,39,307	42.49	Lost	– 2,13,974	– 20.70
