= K. R. Suresh Reddy =

Indian politician

Kethi Reddy Suresh Reddy

Member of Parliament, Rajya Sabha
- In office 10 April 2020 – 9 April 2026
- Preceded by: K. V. P. Ramachandra Rao
- Succeeded by: Vem Narender Reddy
- Constituency: Telangana

16th Speaker of the Andhra Pradesh Legislative Assembly
- In office 2004–2009
- Leader of the House: Y. S. Rajasekhara Reddy
- Preceded by: K. Pratibha Bharati
- Succeeded by: Nallari Kiran Kumar Reddy

Member of Legislative Assembly Andhra Pradesh
- In office 1989–2009
- Preceded by: G. Madhusudhan Reddy
- Succeeded by: Eravathri Anil Kumar
- Constituency: Balkonda

Personal details
- Born: 25 May 1959 (age 66) Choutapally
- Party: Bharat Rashtra Samithi (2018 - Present)
- Other political affiliations: Indian National Congress (1989 - 2018)
- Website: www.krsureshreddy.com

Kethi Reddy Suresh Reddy is an Indian politician who served as a Member of Rajya Sabha from Telangana from 2020 to 2026. He was the Speaker of the Legislative Assembly of Andhra Pradesh from 2004 to 2009. Suresh Reddy Was appointed as BRS Parliamentary Party (BRSPP) leader on 17 June 2024.

== Political career ==
Reddy has had a political career spanning nearly two decades and is a four-time Indian National Congress (INC) MLA from the Balkonda Assembly constituency. He became Speaker of the 12th Andhra Pradesh Legislative Assembly at the age of 45 having begun his career in politics as a mandal-level leader in 1984. He was the first person from Nizamabad district to act as Speaker.

Reddy, began his political career as the mandal Youth Congress president in 1984. In 1989 the former Chief Minister, Marri Chenna Reddy, nominated him as the candidate from Balkonda constituency. He won that and went on to win it again in the 1994, 1999 and 2004 elections, equalling the record of former Finance Minister, Argul Rajaram in that constituency. He was also one of only two INC candidates to win in the Telangana region in the 1994 election, with the other being D. Redya Naik.

In 2009, due to delimitation, the Balkonda constituency was reorganised. Reddy was asked by former Chief Minister Y. S. Rajasekhara Reddy to contest instead the Armur constituency. He lost that election, in part due to the effect of the alliance between the Telugu Desam Party and TRS, as well as the emergence of Chiranjeevi's PRP party.

During his stint as an MLA, he was the Library Committee Chairman of the Assembly from 1990 to 1993. In 1997, he became chairman of the Public Accounts Committee, and he also served as the Congress party whip from 2000-2003.

Senior Congress leader and former Assembly Speaker, K. R. Suresh Reddy on 7 September 2018 announced his decision to join the TRS not for any "political gains" but to be part of the "silent revolution" for the progress and development of Telangana State.

== Positions held in political career ==
- Deputy Floor Leader of TRS party in Rajya Sabha
- Speaker, Andhra Pradesh Legislative Assembly during 2004-09
- Commonwealth Parliamentary Association Executive Committee
- Member, Standing Committee of the All India Presiding Officers, regional representative of India Region
- Member, Indian Region Commonwealth Parliamentary Association Executive Committee
- President, Andhra Pradesh branch of the Commonwealth Parliamentary Association
- 1999-2009, Member of the Andhra Pradesh Legislative Assembly
- Director, Andhra Pradesh Industrial Development Corporation
- INC Whip in the Andhra Pradesh assembly
- Member, Committee on Estimates
- Chairman, Public Accounts Committee
- Member, Cricket Association of Telangana
