= Tadur Bala Goud =

Indian politician

Member of Andhra Pradesh Legislative Assembly.
- In office 1978–1983
- Minister: Cabinet Minister, Andhra Pradesh

Member of Parliament - 8th Lok Sabha
- In office 31 December 1984 – 27 November 1989
- Constituency: Nizamabad (Lok Sabha constituency)

Member of Parliament - 9th Lok Sabha
- In office 2 December 1989 – 13 March 1991
- Constituency: Nizamabad (Lok Sabha constituency)

Personal details
- Born: October 2, 1931 Ilapuram, Nizamabad district, Hyderabad State
- Died: March 1, 2010 (aged 78)
- Party: Indian National Congress
- Spouse: Lakshmidevi (25 March 1945)
- Children: 1 son and 4 dagughters
- Parent: T. Bala Goud (father)
- Profession: Agriculturist, Political and Social Worker

Taduri Bala Goud (2 October 1931 – 1 March 2010) was an Indian politician and member of the Indian National Congress. He was 2 time Member of parliament (MP), represented the Nizamabad constituency in Lok Sabha.

He was also elected as Member of the Legislative Assembly (India)(MLA) from Yellareddy Assembly constituency of Nizamabad district and worked as Cabinet Minister in both former Chief Ministers Tanguturi Anjaiah and Bhavanam Venkataram Reddy cabinets.

== Personal details ==
Bala Goud was born on 2 October 1931 in llapuram village of Nizamabad district of Telangana. He later married Lakshmi Devi.

== Political career ==
Goud began his political career at village level as a Panchayat member and rose to become a Member of the Legislative Assembly and a member of the parliament of India.

He was elected as MLA from Yellareddy Assembly constituency of Nizamabad district in 1978 from Indian National Congress party but lost in 1983 from the same constituency. He worked as a cabinet minister till 1982.

He was later twice elected as a member of Parliament of India from Nizamabad parliamentary constituency in 1984 and 1989 but lost in 1991 elections.

He headed several backward castes organisations to develop alternate political force and build unity among several associations and parties working for the welfare of backward castes and weaker sections in Andhra Pradesh.

- He was convenor of Backward Classes Joint Action Committee(JAC) - which foresees the welfares of backward classes and decides whether new castes can be added to the existing Backward Classes category.
- He was the president of Andhra Pradesh BC Sangham
- He headed the nine-member sub-committee constituted by the Backward Classes United Front - To foster unity among different backward classes organisations and parties namely - Rajyadhikara Party headed by V.G.R Naragoni, Mana Party headed by Kasani Gnaneshwar, AP State BC Welfare Association headed by R. Krishnaiah, and BC United Front Party headed by P. Ramakrishnaiah .

== Positions held ==
#	From	To	Position
1.	1960	1970	Gram Sarpanch.
2.	1970	1975	President of Panchayat Samiti, Yellareddy, Andhra Pradesh.
3.	1978	1983	Member of Andhra Pradesh Legislative Assembly.: Cabinet Minister of Andhra Pradesh.
4.	1982	1984	Chairman of Zila Parishad, Nizamabad, Andhra Pradesh.
5.	1984	1989	MP (1st term) in 8th Lok Sabha from Nizamabad.
6.	1989	1991	MP (2nd term) in 9th Lok Sabha from Nizamabad.
