= Balkonda Assembly constituency =

Constituency of the Telangana legislative assembly in India

Coordinates: 18.87°N 78.34°E

Balkonda
- Constituency No. 19 for the Telangana Legislative Assembly
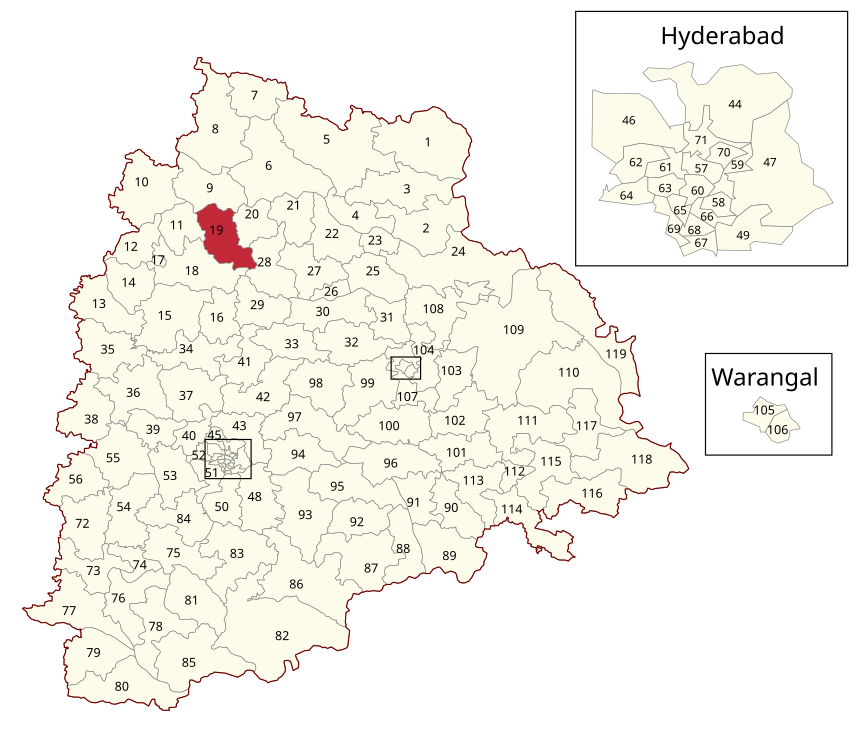
- Location of Balkonda Assembly constituency within Telangana

Constituency details
- Country: India
- Region: South India
- State: Telangana
- District: Nizamabad
- Lok Sabha constituency: Nizamabad
- Established: 1951
- Total electors: 1,77,673
- Reservation: None

Member of Legislative Assembly
- 3rd Telangana Legislative Assembly
- Incumbent Vemula Prashanth Reddy
- Party: Telangana Rashtra Samithi

Balkonda Assembly constituency is a constituency of the Telangana Legislative Assembly, India. It is one of the five constituencies in Nizamabad district. It is part of Nizamabad Lok Sabha constituency.

Vemula Prashanth Reddy of Telangana Rashtra Samithi is representing the constituency.

== Mandals ==
The assembly constituency presently comprises the following mandals:

Mandal
Balkonda
Mortad
Kammarpally
Mendora
Velpur
Yergatla
Bheemgal
Mupkal

== Members of the Legislative Assembly ==
Year	Member	Party
Hyderabad State
1952	K. Anantha Reddy	Samajwadi Party
United Andhra Pradesh
1957	Ranga Reddy	Indian National Congress
1962	Gaddam Rajaram	Indian National Congress
1972	Gaddam Rajaram	Indian National Congress
1978	Gaddam Rajaram	Indian National Congress
1983	G. Madhusudhan Reddy	Independent politician
1985	G. Madhusudhan Reddy	Telugu Desam Party
1989	K. R. Suresh Reddy	Indian National Congress
1994	K. R. Suresh Reddy	Indian National Congress
1999	K. R. Suresh Reddy	Indian National Congress
2004	K. R. Suresh Reddy	Indian National Congress
2009	Anil Kumar Eravathri	Praja Rajyam Party
Telangana
2014	Vemula Prashanth Reddy	Telangana Rashtra Samithi
2018	Vemula Prashanth Reddy	Telangana Rashtra Samithi
2023	Vemula Prashanth Reddy	Bharat Rashtra Samithi

Hyderabad State
Andhra Pradesh

== Election results ==
=== Assembly Election 2023 ===
2023 Telangana Legislative Assembly election : Balkonda
Party	Candidate	Votes	%	±%
BRS	Vemula Prashanth Reddy	70,417	40.28%	New
INC	Sunil Kumar Muthyala	65,884	37.68%	▲17.78
BJP	Annapurna Devi Aleti	30,250	17.30%	▲15.28
Alliance of Democratic Reforms Party	Gadde Srinivas	3,313	1.89%	New
BSP	Pallikonda Narsaiah	1,228	0.70%	▼26.27
NOTA	None of the above	1,162	0.66%	▼0.57
Margin of victory		4,533	2.59%	▼18.60
Turnout		178,355	80.52%	▲0.78
Total valid votes		174,839		
Registered electors		221,511		▲14.02
BRS gain from BRS		Swing	▼7.88	

=== Assembly Election 2018 ===
2018 Telangana Legislative Assembly election : Balkonda
Party	Candidate	Votes	%	±%
BRS	Vemula Prashanth Reddy	73,662	48.16%	▲0.17
BSP	Sunil Kumar Muthyala	41,254	26.97%	New
INC	Anil Kumar Eravathri	30,433	19.90%	▼2.93
BJP	Ruyyadi Rajeshwar	3,097	2.02%	New
NOTA	None of the above	1,886	1.23%	▲0.16
Independent	Gunti Benarji	1,171	0.77%	New
Independent	Abdul Nayeem	1,026	0.67%	New
Margin of victory		32,408	21.19%	▼3.97
Turnout		154,912	79.74%	▲5.49
Total valid votes		152,965		
Registered electors		194,281		▼2.15
BRS hold		Swing	▲0.17	

=== Assembly Election 2014 ===
2014 Telangana Legislative Assembly election : Balkonda
Party	Candidate	Votes	%	±%
BRS	Vemula Prashanth Reddy	69,145	47.99%	▲23.78
INC	Anil Kumar Eravathri	32,897	22.83%	▼6.87
TDP	Aleti Mallikarjun Reddy	25,494	17.69%	New
Independent	M. J. Dr. Madhushekhar	7,890	5.48%	New
Independent	Boga Ashok	3,840	2.67%	New
Independent	Kuninti Mahipal Reddy	1,540	1.07%	New
NOTA	None of the above	1,535	1.07%	New
Margin of victory		36,248	25.16%	▲18.81
Turnout		147,429	74.25%	▼1.77
Total valid votes		144,087		
Registered electors		198,545		▲17.45
BRS gain from PRP		Swing	▲11.94	

=== Assembly Election 2009 ===
2009 Andhra Pradesh Legislative Assembly election : Balkonda
Party	Candidate	Votes	%	±%
PRP	Anil Kumar Eravathri	46,313	36.05%	New
INC	Srinivas Reddy Shanigaram	38,154	29.70%	▼23.85
BRS	Surender Reddy Vemula	31,108	24.21%	New
BJP	Ruyyadi Rajeshwar	5,731	4.46%	New
Pyramid Party of India	Madukar Eligeti	3,102	2.41%	▲0.99
LSP	Naveen Reddy Kyatham	2,401	1.87%	New
BSP	Ramesh Yadav Basa	1,658	1.29%	▼2.26
Margin of victory		8,159	6.35%	▼6.47
Turnout		128,514	76.02%	▲2.00
Total valid votes		128,467		
Registered electors		169,042		▲23.96
PRP gain from INC		Swing	▼17.50	

=== Assembly Election 2004 ===
2004 Andhra Pradesh Legislative Assembly election : Balkonda
Party	Candidate	Votes	%	±%
INC	K. R. Suresh Reddy	54,054	53.55%	▼1.07
TDP	Vasanth Reddy	41,113	40.73%	▼2.55
BSP	Chityala Rajanna	3,579	3.55%	New
Pyramid Party of India	Puppala Umalatha	1,438	1.42%	New
Independent	Meera Gangaram	861	0.85%	New
Margin of victory		12,941	12.82%	▲1.48
Turnout		100,944	74.02%	▲3.27
Total valid votes		100,939		
Rejected ballots		5	0.00%	▼3.21
Registered electors		136,367		▼5.86
INC hold		Swing	▼1.07	

=== Assembly Election 1999 ===
1999 Andhra Pradesh Legislative Assembly election : Balkonda
Party	Candidate	Votes	%	±%
INC	K. R. Suresh Reddy	54,182	54.62%	▲10.41
TDP	Aloor Ganga Reddy	42,935	43.28%	▲5.51
Independent	Matunga Muthenna	1,558	1.57%	New
Margin of victory		11,247	11.34%	▲4.89
Turnout		102,488	70.75%	▼0.16
Total valid votes		99,202		
Rejected ballots		3,286	3.21%	▲0.85
Registered electors		144,850		▲10.26
INC hold		Swing	▲10.41	

=== Assembly Election 1994 ===
1994 Andhra Pradesh Legislative Assembly election : Balkonda
Party	Candidate	Votes	%	±%
INC	K. R. Suresh Reddy	40,219	44.21%	▼7.25
TDP	Baddam Narsa Reddy	34,356	37.77%	▼6.68
BJP	Baddam Linga Reddy	9,058	9.96%	New
Independent	Vanamala Krishna	3,735	4.11%	New
BSP	Basa Rajeshwar	2,680	2.95%	▲1.26
Independent	Mohammed Saleem	640	0.70%	New
Margin of victory		5,863	6.45%	▼0.55
Turnout		93,159	70.91%	▲1.55
Total valid votes		90,963		
Rejected ballots		2,196	2.36%	▼2.03
Registered electors		131,372		▲2.26
INC hold		Swing	▼7.25	

=== Assembly Election 1989 ===
1989 Andhra Pradesh Legislative Assembly election : Balkonda
Party	Candidate	Votes	%	±%
INC	K. R. Suresh Reddy	43,837	51.46%	▲16.36
TDP	Mothe Ganga Reddy	37,871	44.45%	▼15.08
BSP	Oddi Rajalingam	1,442	1.69%	New
Independent	Kurme Mallaiah	841	0.99%	New
Independent	Mastha Narayana	688	0.81%	New
Margin of victory		5,966	7.00%	▼17.43
Turnout		89,102	69.36%	▲4.14
Total valid votes		85,191		
Rejected ballots		3,911	4.39%	▲2.20
Registered electors		128,469		▲19.64
INC gain from TDP		Swing	▼8.07	

=== Assembly Election 1985 ===
1985 Andhra Pradesh Legislative Assembly election : Balkonda
Party	Candidate	Votes	%	±%
TDP	G. Madhusudhan Reddy	40,779	59.53%	New
INC	G. Pramila Devi	24,046	35.10%	▲14.77
Independent	A. Kishan Goud	1,279	1.87%	New
Independent	Gaddam Srinivasreddy	863	1.26%	New
Independent	Palbu Raja	668	0.98%	New
Independent	S. Narsagoud	610	0.89%	New
Margin of victory		16,733	24.43%	▼18.67
Turnout		70,031	65.22%	▼4.12
Total valid votes		68,499		
Rejected ballots		1,532	2.19%	▲0.12
Registered electors		107,381		▲14.16
TDP gain from Independent		Swing	▼3.90	

=== Assembly Election 1983 ===
1983 Andhra Pradesh Legislative Assembly election : Balkonda
Party	Candidate	Votes	%	±%
Independent	G. Madhusudhan Reddy	40,513	63.43%	New
INC	Gaddam Susheela Bai	12,984	20.33%	▲16.86
Independent	K. Sridhar Reddy	9,608	15.04%	New
Independent	Mastha Narayana	549	0.86%	New
Margin of victory		27,529	43.10%	▲10.17
Turnout		65,218	69.34%	▼6.97
Total valid votes		63,868		
Rejected ballots		1,350	2.07%	▼1.39
Registered electors		94,058		▲9.45
Independent gain from INC(I)		Swing	▼1.30	

=== Assembly Election 1978 ===
1978 Andhra Pradesh Legislative Assembly election : Balkonda
Party	Candidate	Votes	%	±%
INC(I)	Gaddam Rajaram	40,977	64.73%	New
JP	Gaddam Madhusudan Reddy	20,133	31.80%	New
INC	Anand Velumala	2,195	3.47%	▼52.69
Margin of victory		20,844	32.93%	▲17.73
Turnout		65,576	76.31%	▲12.43
Total valid votes		63,305		
Rejected ballots		2,271	3.46%	▲3.46
Registered electors		85,938		▼8.52
INC(I) gain from INC		Swing	▲8.57	

=== Assembly Election 1972 ===
1972 Andhra Pradesh Legislative Assembly election : Balkonda
Party	Candidate	Votes	%	±%
INC	Gaddam Rajaram	32,413	56.16%	▼5.21
Independent	Rajeshwer	23,638	40.96%	New
Independent	V. Subbarao	1,664	2.88%	New
Margin of victory		8,775	15.20%	▼21.36
Turnout		60,010	63.88%	▲4.77
Total valid votes		57,715		
Registered electors		93,943		▲41.28
INC hold		Swing	▼5.21	

=== Assembly Election 1962 ===
1962 Andhra Pradesh Legislative Assembly election : Balkonda
Party	Candidate	Votes	%	±%
INC	Gaddam Rajaram	22,985	61.37%	▲4.54
Independent	Khyatham Sridhar Reddy	9,292	24.81%	New
CPI	Gangam Narasa Reddy	5,174	13.82%	New
Margin of victory		13,693	36.56%	▲1.49
Turnout		39,306	59.11%	▼0.04
Total valid votes		37,451		
Registered electors		66,492		▲11.85
INC hold		Swing	▲4.54	

=== Assembly Election 1957 ===
1957 Andhra Pradesh Legislative Assembly election : Balkonda
Party	Candidate	Votes	%	±%
INC	Ranga Reddy	19,985	56.83%	▲13.98
PDF	Raja Gowd	7,654	21.77%	New
Independent	Narsimhareddy	7,526	21.40%	New
Margin of victory		12,331	35.07%	▲20.77
Turnout		35,165	59.15%	▲15.25
Total valid votes		35,165		
Registered electors		59,447		▲19.66
INC gain from SP		Swing	▼0.32	

=== Assembly Election 1952 ===
1952 Hyderabad State Legislative Assembly election : Balkonda
Party	Candidate	Votes	%	±%
SP	K. Anantha Reddy	12,465	57.15%	New
INC	Ranga Reddy	9,346	42.85%	New
Margin of victory		3,119	14.30%	
Turnout		21,811	43.90%	
Total valid votes		21,811		
Registered electors		49,681		
SP win (new seat)				

== See also ==
- List of constituencies of Telangana Legislative Assembly
