= D. Srinivas (politician) =

Indian politician (1948–2024)

Dharmapuri. Srinivas

Member of Parliament, Rajya Sabha
- In office 22 June 2016 – 4 July 2022
- Preceded by: V. Hanumantha Rao
- Succeeded by: D. Damodar Rao

1st Leader of Opposition Telangana Legislative Council
- In office 3 June 2014 – 2 July 2015
- Preceded by: Position Established
- Succeeded by: Vacant (-2024); S. Madhusudhana Chary (2024)
- Constituency: Nizamabad

Minister of Higher Education Government of United Andhra Pradesh
- In office 14 May 2004 – 20 May 2009
- Governor: Surjit Singh Barnala; N. D. Tiwari
- Chief Minister: Y. S. Rajasekhara Reddy
- Preceded by: Karnam Ramachandra Rao
- Succeeded by: D. Sridhar Babu

31st President of the United Andhra Pradesh Congress Committee
- In office 2008–2011
- AICC President: Sonia Gandhi
- Preceded by: K. Keshava Rao
- Succeeded by: Botsa Satyanarayana
- In office 2004–2005
- AICC President: Sonia Gandhi
- Preceded by: M. Satyanarayana Ra
- Succeeded by: K. Keshava Rao

Member of Legislative Assembly United Andhra Pradesh
- In office 1999–2009
- Preceded by: Satish Pawar
- Succeeded by: Endela Lakshminarayana
- Constituency: Nizamabad Urban
- In office 1989–1994
- Preceded by: D. Satyanarayana
- Succeeded by: Satish Pawar
- Constituency: Nizamabad Urban

Personal details
- Born: Dharmapuri Srinivas; 27 September 1948 Velpur, Hyderabad State, India
- Died: 29 June 2024 (aged 75) Hyderabad, Telangana, India
- Party: Indian National Congress (1989–2016); (2022–2024)
- Other political affiliations: Bharat Rashtra Samithi (2016–2022)
- Spouse: Vijayalakshmi
- Children: Sanjay, Arvind

Dharmapuri Srinivas (27 September 1948 – 29 June 2024) was an Indian politician from Telangana. He was a four-time legislator, serving three terms as a Member of the Legislative Assembly and one term as a Member of the Legislative Council (MLC). He also served as a Member of the Rajya Sabha and twice as the president of the Andhra Pradesh Congress Committee, in 2004 and 2009.

== Electoral history ==
Year	Constituency	Party	Votes	Opponent		Result	Margin
1989	Nizamabad	INC	52,340	TDP	D. Satyanarayana	Won	12,410
1994	Nizamabad	INC	38,120	TDP	Yashoda Reddy	Lost	-8,650
1999	Nizamabad	INC	58,450	TDP	Satish Pawar	Won	6,320
2004	Nizamabad	INC	64,120	TDP	Yashoda Reddy	Won	14,890
2009	Nizamabad	INC	46,210	BJP	Endala Laxminarayana	Lost	-13,450
2010 (By-el.)	Nizamabad	INC	48,150	BJP	Endala Laxminarayana	Lost	-11,811
2011 (MLC)	MLA Quota	INC	—	—	Unopposed	Won	—
2014	Nizamabad Rural	INC	41,320	TRS	Bajireddy Goverdhan	Lost	-26,547
2016 (Rajya Sabha)	Telangana	TRS	—	—	Unopposed	Won	—

== Early life ==
Srinivas was born on 27 September 1948 in Velpur, Nizamabad District, Andhra Pradesh (now Telangana), to Dharmapuri Venkatram and Dharmapuri Laxmibai. His father was a former District President of Jan Sangh. Srinivas completed his Bachelor of Commerce (B.Com.) degree from Nizam College, Hyderabad and LL.B. from Osmania University, Hyderabad

== Political career ==
Srinivas joined Indian National Congress as a youth leader and worked for Youth Congress. He became an MLA for the first time winning the 1989 Andhra Pradesh Legislative Assembly election. He regained the Nizamabad seat in 1999 and won for the third time in 2004, in the erstwhile Andhra Pradesh state. He served as Minister for Higher Education and Intermediate Education in Y. S. Rajashekhar Reddy's Ministry from 2004 to 2009. He also served with different portfolios in the cabinets of chief ministers Marri Chenna Reddy, Nedurumilli Janardhan Reddy and Kotla Vijayabhaskar Reddy.

He was the Andhra Pradesh Congress Committee president during the 2004 and 2009 assembly and general elections. He was a nephew of former finance minister Argul Rajaram of A.P. State. He lost the elections in 2009, 2010, and 2012 to the Bharatiya Janata Party (BJP) and in 2014 to the Bharat Rashtra Samithi Party (BRS).

He was elected as a Member of the State Legislative Council in 2011 and elected leader of the party in the Telangana Legislative Council. In the 2014 elections, he contested from Nizamabad rural assembly constituency but lost to Telangana Rashtra Samithi (TRS) candidate Bajireddy Goverdhan.

On 2 July 2015, he resigned from the Congress Party and joined BRS. He was a Rajya Sabha Member from 2016 to 2022, and later rejoined the Congress Party.

== Personal life and death ==
DS married Vijayalaxmi. The couple had two sons: Sanjay Dharmapuri, a former Mayor of Nizamabad, and Dharmapuri Arvind, a two-time sitting Member of Parliament from Nizamabad from Bharatiya Janata Party (BJP).

After suffering from illness for some time, Srinivas died of a heart attack in Hyderabad, on 29 June 2024, at the age of 75.

== Cabinet roles ==
Srinivas served in various ministerial positions under multiple Andhra Pradesh chief ministers, including Marri Chenna Reddy, N. Janardhana Reddy, Kotla Vijayabhaskar Reddy, and Y. S. Rajasekhara Reddy. His ministerial portfolios included:

Cabinet Positions Held by D. Srinivas
Year	Portfolio(s)	Notes
1989–1990	Minister for Excise, Sports, and Backward Classes Welfare	Also served as in-charge minister for Home and Law & Order, playing a key role in controlling the 1990 Hyderabad riots.
1991	Minister for Self-Employment and Sericulture	Focused on skill development and employment generation.
1992	Minister for Rural Development, Rural Water Supply, Sericulture, Handlooms, and Textiles	Oversaw major initiatives in rural infrastructure and textile industry.
1993	Minister for Information and Public Relations, Cinematography, and Film Development Corporation	Promoted the state's film industry and media outreach.
2004–2007	Minister for Rural Development, Rural Water Supply, Employment Generation, BC Welfare, and Urban Land Ceiling	Led welfare programs aimed at backward communities and urban reforms.
2007–2008	Minister for Higher Education and Intermediate Education	Worked towards education system reforms in Andhra Pradesh.

D. Srinivas served as the president of the Andhra Pradesh Congress Committee (APCC) during the 2004 and 2009 elections, leading the Indian National Congress (INC) to major victories:

Election Results under D. Srinivas' Leadership
Year	Election Type	Congress Seats Won	UPA Seats Won
2004	Lok Sabha	29	34 (including 5 by BRS)
2009	Lok Sabha	33	N/A

== See also ==
- Arvind Dharmapuri
