= Dharpalle =

Dharpalle Dharpally
- Town
- Nickname: దారిన పోయే పల్లె
- Location in Telangana, India Dharpalle (India)
- Coordinates: 18.575633°N 78.364807°E
- Country: India
- State: Telangana
- District: Nizamabad, Telangana

Government
  - Type: Government of Telangana
  - Member of Legislative Assembly: బాజిరెడ్డి గోవర్ధన్(BRS) (Nizamabad Rural Assembly constistuency)

Area
  - Total: 6 km^{2} (2.3 sq mi)
- Elevation: 440 m (1,440 ft)

Population
  - Total: 25,600
  - Density: 4,300/km^{2} (11,000/sq mi)

Languages
  - Official: తెలుగు
- Time zone: UTC+5:30 (IST)
- Pin Code: 503165
- Area code: 08461
- Vehicle registration: TS-16, AP-25 ,TG -16
- Website: www.telangana.gov.in nizamabad.telangana.gov.in

ధర్పళ్లి మండలం

Dharpally is a village and a mandal in Nizamabad district in the state of Telangana in India. Dharpally is a major Town in Nizamabad Rural Assembly constituency Dharpally is 15 kilometres distance from the NH44. Dharpally located the center from the Three District Headquarters It's 40 KM long from the District Headquarter Nizamabad. It's 38KM long from the District Headquarter kamareddy and it's 65 KM long from the District Headquarter of Siricilla
