= Sanigaram Santosh Reddy =

Indian politician (born 1942)

Member of Legislative Assembly Andhra Pradesh
- In office 2004–2009
- Preceded by: Aleti Annapurna Devi
- Succeeded by: Bajireddy Goverdhan
- Constituency: Armur
- In office 1989–1994
- Preceded by: Aleti Mahipal Reddy
- Succeeded by: Aleti Annapurna Devi
- Constituency: Armur
- In office 1978–1985
- Preceded by: Tummala Ranga Reddy
- Succeeded by: Aleti Mahipal Reddy
- Constituency: Armur

Personal details
- Born: 12 November 1942 (age 83) Muchkuru, Hyderabad State, British India(now Telangana State, India
- Known for: Actor, Politics
- Nickname: SSR

Sanigaram Santosh Reddy (born 12 November 1942), more commonly known as Santanna, Santosh Reddy, Mrudhu Swabhavi, Pedala Pennidhi by his followers, is an Indian politician and former minister of Telangana state. He is also related to Late Sri Muduganti Ramgopal Reddy ex. MP (1971 to 1984) and took him as an inspiration to be a leader.

== Family background and education ==
Reddy was born into a middle-class family at Muchkuru village of Nizamabad District, Telangana. He graduated Bachelor of Arts from the Giriraj government College Nizamabad, Osmania University Andhra Pradesh.

== Political career ==
=== Entry into politics ===
He was attracted to politics during his college days and he was influenced by the then socialist leaders Late. Sri Muduganti Ramgopal Reddy, Late. Sri. G. Rajaram and BR Ganga Reddy of Nizamabad district. He was elected as General Secretary in 1964–65 and as president in 1966–67 of Giriraj Government College, Nizamabad. Later he was elected as Grampanchayath Member of Muchkur village in 1970. He was appointed district youth congress President Nizamabad in 1971 and elected as General Secretary for Nizamabad Beedi Mazdur Sangh, Nizamabad. He worked as State Council Member, Andhra Pradesh Youth Congress Committee in 1975. He joined YSR congress party.

=== Member of legislative assembly ===
In 1978, Reddy was elected as Member of Legislative Assembly (MLA), Andhra Pradesh from Armoor constituency along with former Chief Minister Dr. Y. S. Raja Sekhara Reddy and former Chief Minister Mr. Nara Chandra Babu Naidu. He was elected as (MLA) for the second time in the wave of then film star NT Rama Rao in 1983. He was elected for the third time as (MLA) in 1989. And he was elected as (MLA) for the fourth time in 2004 (BRS).

=== State minister ===
Reddy worked as Minister for Roads & Buildings in 1990–1991 and then Finance Minister in 1991–1992 in the Nedurimalli Janardhan Reddy's Cabinet. And in 1992–1993 he worked as Minister for Major Industries in the Kotla Vijaya Bhasker Reddy's Cabinet. Later he worked as Minister for Transport in Dr. Y. S. Rajasekhara Reddy's Cabinet in 2004–2005.

== Acting career ==
In 1991 Reddy acted as Speaker role in the Telugu film Thegimpu. He also acted as a poet in a video movie Andhra Vaibhavam.

== Personal life ==
Santosh Reddy is having a son Shanigaram Srinivas Reddy (Vasu Babu), who lives in the US, has entered active politics. He is the presumptive Congress candidate from Armoor for the 2009 general elections.
