= Nizamabad Urban Assembly constituency =

Constituency of the Telangana legislative assembly in India

Coordinates: 18.68°N 78.10°E

Nizamabad (Urban)
- Constituency No. 17 for the Telangana Legislative Assembly
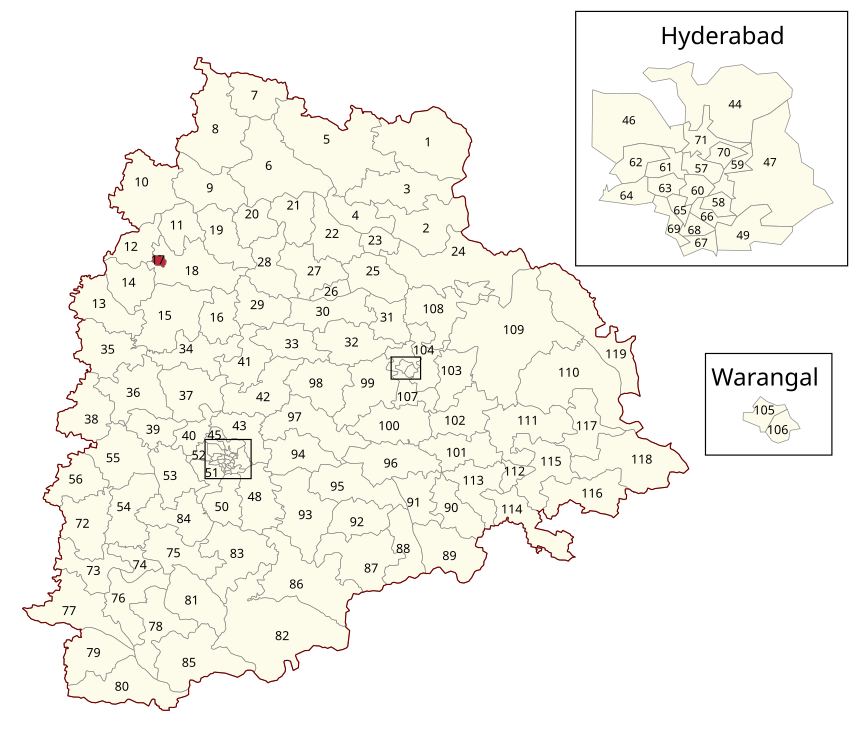
- Location of Nizamabad Urban Assembly constituency within Telangana

Constituency details
- Country: India
- Region: South India
- State: Telangana
- District: Nizamabad
- Lok Sabha constituency: Nizamabad
- Established: 1951
- Total electors: 2,86,766
- Reservation: None

Member of Legislative Assembly
- 3rd Telangana Legislative Assembly
- Incumbent Dhanpal Suryanarayana
- Party: Bharatiya Janata Party
- Elected year: 2023

Nizamabad (Urban) Assembly constituency is a constituency of Telangana Legislative Assembly, India. It is one among two constituencies in the City of Nizamabad with a population of 3,11,152. It is part of Nizamabad Lok Sabha constituency.

Dhanpal Suryanarayana Gupta of Bharatiya Janata Party is currently representing the constituency.

== Extent of the constituency ==
The Assembly Constituency presently comprises the following :

Mandal
Nizamabad city

== Members of Legislative Assembly ==
Duration	Member	Political party
Hyderabad State
1952	Mohammed Dawar Hussain	Indian National Congress
United Andhra Pradesh
1957	Mohammed Dawar Hussain	Indian National Congress
1962	Hari Narayan	Independent politician
1967	K. V. Gangadhar	
1972	V. Chakradhar Rao	
1978	A. Kishan Das	Indian National Congress
1983	D. Satyanarayana	Telugu Desam Party
1985	D. Satyanarayana	Telugu Desam Party
1989	Dharmapuri Srinivas	Indian National Congress
1994	Satish Pawar	Telugu Desam Party
1999	Dharmapuri Srinivas	Indian National Congress
2004	Dharmapuri Srinivas	Indian National Congress
2009	Endela Lakshminarayana	Bharatiya Janata Party
2010 ✯	Endela Lakshminarayana	Bharatiya Janata Party
Telangana
2014	Bigala Ganesha Gupta	Telangana Rashtra Samithi
2018	Bigala Ganesha Gupta	Telangana Rashtra Samithi
2023	Dhanpal Suryanarayana Gupta	Bharatiya Janata Party

✯ by-election

=== Assembly Election 2023 ===
2023 Telangana Legislative Assembly election : Nizamabad Urban
Party	Candidate	Votes	%	±%
BJP	Dhanpal Suryanarayana	75,240	40.82%	▲24.83
INC	Mohammed Ali Shabbir	59,853	32.47%	▲2.03
BRS	Bigala Ganesh	44,829	24.32%	▼23.21
NOTA	None of the above	538	0.29%	▼0.28
Margin of victory		15,387	8.35%	▼8.75
Turnout		184,332	62.51%	▼0.16
Total valid votes		184,332		
BJP gain from BRS		Swing	▲24.02	

=== Assembly Election 2018 ===
2018 Telangana Legislative Assembly election : Nizamabad Urban
Party	Candidate	Votes	%	±%
TRS	Bigala Ganesh	71,896	47.53%	▲16.38
INC	Taher Bin Hamdan	46,055	30.44%	New
BJP	Yendala Laxminarayana	24,192	15.99%	▼4.92
Margin of victory		25,841	17.08%	▲9.46
Turnout		151,279	62.65%	▲6.63
Total valid votes		151,279		
TRS hold		Swing	▲16.38	

=== Assembly Election 2014 ===
2014 Andhra Pradesh Legislative Assembly election : Nizamabad Urban
Party	Candidate	Votes	%	±%
TRS	Bigala Ganesh	42,148	31.15%	New
AIMIM	Mir Majaz Ali Shaik	31,840	23.53%	New
BJP	Yendala Laxminarayana	28,301	20.91%	▼21.61
INC	Bomma Mahesh Kumar Goud	25,742	19.02%	▼11.93
Margin of victory		10,308	7.62%	▼3.93
Turnout		135,326	56.02%	▼4.33
Total valid votes		135,326		
TRS gain from BJP		Swing	New	

=== Assembly By-election 2010 ===
2010 Andhra Pradesh Legislative Assembly by-election : Nizamabad Urban
Party	Candidate	Votes	%	±%
BJP	Yendala Laxminarayana	64,176	53.11%	▲10.59
INC	Dharmapuri Srinivas	52,195	43.20%	▲12.25
TDP	Arikala Narsa Reddy	1,793	1.48%	New
Margin of victory		11,981	9.91%	▼1.66
Total valid votes		120,822		
BJP hold		Swing	▲10.59	

=== Assembly Election 2009 ===
2009 Andhra Pradesh Legislative Assembly election : Nizamabad Urban
Party	Candidate	Votes	%	±%
BJP	Yendala Laxminarayana	40,475	42.52%	New
INC	Dharmapuri Srinivas	29,460	30.95%	New
PRP	M. A. Rahim	15,902	16.71%	New
Margin of victory		11,015	11.57%	New
Total valid votes		95,191		
BJP gain from INC		Swing	New	

=== Assembly Election 2004 ===
2004 Andhra Pradesh Legislative Assembly election : Nizamabad
Party	Candidate	Votes	%	±%
INC	Dharmapuri Srinivas	69,780	53.20%	New
TDP	Satish Pawar	41,623	31.73%	New
Margin of victory		28,157	21.47%	New
Total valid votes		131,165		
INC hold		Swing	New	

=== Assembly Election 1999 ===
1999 Andhra Pradesh Legislative Assembly election : Nizamabad
Party	Candidate	Votes	%	±%
INC	Dharmapuri Srinivas	61,027	48.91%	New
BJP	Yendala Laxminarayana	54,037	43.30%	New
Margin of victory		6,990	5.61%	New
Total valid votes		124,785		
INC gain from TDP		Swing	New	

=== Assembly Election 1994 ===
1994 Andhra Pradesh Legislative Assembly election : Nizamabad
Party	Candidate	Votes	%	±%
TDP	Satish Pawar	50,295	44.52%	New
INC	Dharmapuri Srinivas	37,212	32.94%	New
Margin of victory		13,083	11.58%	New
Total valid votes		112,965		
TDP gain from INC		Swing	New	

=== Assembly Election 1989 ===
1989 Andhra Pradesh Legislative Assembly election : Nizamabad
Party	Candidate	Votes	%	±%
INC	Dharmapuri Srinivas	45,558	54.34%	New
TDP	D. Satyanarayana	31,549	37.63%	New
Margin of victory		14,009	16.71%	New
Total valid votes		83,836		
INC gain from TDP		Swing	New	

=== Assembly Election 1985 ===
1985 Andhra Pradesh Legislative Assembly election : Nizamabad
Party	Candidate	Votes	%	±%
TDP	D. Satyanarayana	42,082	52.80%	New
INC	Taher Bin Hamdan	32,761	41.11%	New
Margin of victory		9,321	11.69%	New
Total valid votes		79,697		
TDP hold		Swing	New	

=== Assembly Election 1983 ===
1983 Andhra Pradesh Legislative Assembly election : Nizamabad
Party	Candidate	Votes	%	±%
TDP	D. Satyanarayana	40,841	57.88%	New
INC	Dharmapuri Srinivas	20,296	28.76%	New
Margin of victory		20,545	29.12%	New
Total valid votes		70,560		
TDP gain from INC		Swing	New	

=== Assembly Election 1978 ===
1978 Andhra Pradesh Legislative Assembly election : Nizamabad
Party	Candidate	Votes	%	±%
INC(I)	A. Kishan Das	33,375	53.94%	New
JP	Ganga Reddy	18,349	29.66%	New
Margin of victory		15,026	24.28%	New
Total valid votes		61,872		
INC(I) gain from Independent		Swing	New	

=== Assembly Election 1972 ===
1972 Andhra Pradesh Legislative Assembly election : Nizamabad
Party	Candidate	Votes	%	±%
Independent	V. Chakradhar Rao	23,284	48.74%	New
INC	P. Gangadhar	18,450	38.62%	New
Margin of victory		4,834	10.12%	New
Total valid votes		47,771		
Independent hold		Swing	New	

=== Assembly Election 1967 ===
1967 Andhra Pradesh Legislative Assembly election : Nizamabad
Party	Candidate	Votes	%	±%
Independent	K. V. Gangadhar	21,392	51.48%	New
INC	M. W. Baig	14,281	34.37%	New
Margin of victory		7,111	17.11%	New
Total valid votes		41,556		
Independent hold		Swing	New	

=== Assembly Election 1962 ===
1962 Andhra Pradesh Legislative Assembly election : Nizamabad
Party	Candidate	Votes	%	±%
Independent	Hari Narayan	15,283	48.14%	New
INC	Mohammed Dawar Hussain	12,875	40.56%	New
Margin of victory		2,408	7.58%	New
Total valid votes		31,747		
Independent gain from INC		Swing	New	

=== Assembly Election 1957 ===
1957 Andhra Pradesh Legislative Assembly election : Nizamabad
Party	Candidate	Votes	%	±%
INC	Mohammed Dawar Hussain	12,481	49.32%	New
Independent	K. A. Reddy	8,920	35.25%	New
Margin of victory		3,561	14.07%	New
Total valid votes		25,306		
INC hold		Swing	New	

=== Assembly Election 1952 ===
1952 Hyderabad State Legislative Assembly election : Nizamabad
Party	Candidate	Votes	%	±%
INC	Mohammed Dawar Hussain	11,250	46.21%	New
Socialist	B. R. G. Reddy	7,810	32.08%	New
Margin of victory		3,440	14.13%	New
Total valid votes		24,342		
INC win		Swing	New	

== See also ==
- Nizamabad (Rural) (Assembly constituency)
- List of constituencies of Telangana Legislative Assembly
