= M. Narayana Reddy =

Indian politician (1931–2020)

Member of Parliament, Lok Sabha
- In office 1967–1971
- Preceded by: Harish Chandra Heda
- Succeeded by: M. Ram Gopal Reddy
- Constituency: Nizamabad

Andhra Pradesh Legislative Assembly
- In office 1972–1978
- Preceded by: R. B. Rao
- Succeeded by: Gulam Samdhani
- Constituency: Bodhan

Personal details
- Born: 10 September 1931
- Died: 2 February 2020 (aged 88)
- Education: Osmania University

M. Narayana Reddy (10 September 1931 – 2 February 2020) was an Indian lawyer and politician from Telangana. He was a member of the Lok Sabha and Andhra Pradesh Legislative Assembly.

== Biography ==
Reddy was born on 10 September 1931 at Sunket in Nizamabad. He studied at Chadarghat College and Osmania University.

Reddy was elected as a member of the Lok Sabha from Nizamabad as an independent candidate in 1967. He was the first parliamentarian who raised the issue of separate Telangana in Lok Sabha. In 1972 he was elected as a member of the Andhra Pradesh Legislative Assembly from Bodhan as an Indian National Congress candidate.

Reddy died on 2 February 2020 at a private hospital in Nizamabad at the age of 88.
