= Anil Kumar Eravathri =

Indian politician

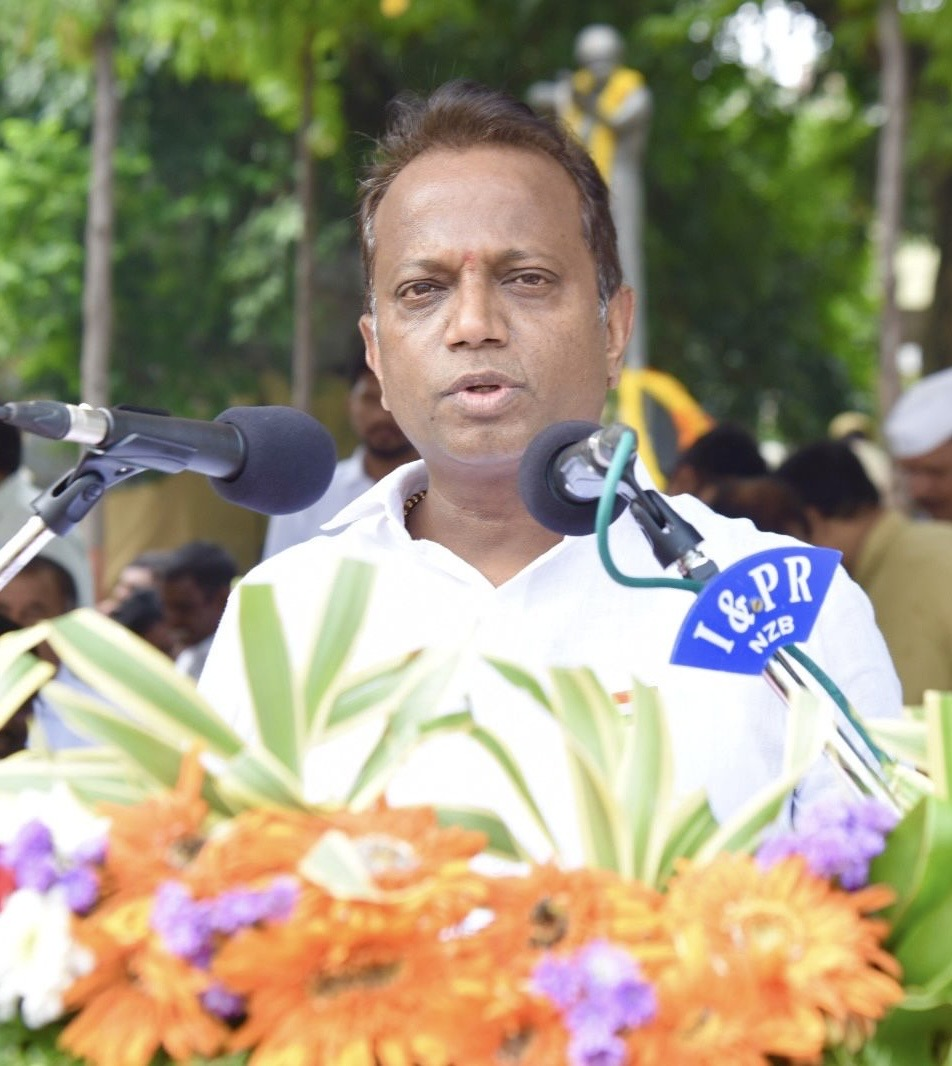
- Anil in 2024

Chairman Telangana Mineral Development Corporation
- In office 8 July 2024 – 8 July 2026
- Preceded by: Manne Krishank

Government Whip United Andhra Pradesh Legislative Assembly
- In office 2012–2014

Member of Legislative Assembly
- In office 2009–2014
- Preceded by: K R Suresh Reddy
- Succeeded by: Vemula Prashanth Reddy
- Constituency: Balkonda

Personal details
- Born: Nizamabad, India
- Party: Indian National Congress
- Other political affiliations: Praja Rajyam Party
- Spouse: 1
- Children: 2
- Website: www.anileravathri.com

Anil Kumar Eravathri is an Indian politician who represented Balkonda Assembly constituency from 2009 to 2014, as MLA and served as a government whip in the United Andhra Pradesh assembly from 2012 to 2014. He is a US returned engineer who has his own Internet of things firm in Hyderabad. He is a member of the Indian National Congress party. Anil served as the chairperson of the Telangana Mineral Development Corporation from 2024 to 2026. He is a member of the 22-member Political Affairs Committee of the Telangana Pradesh Congress Committee.

== Background ==
Anil Eravathri was born in the Nizamabad district in Padmashali. He completed his bachelor's degree in engineering from Chaitanya Bharathi Institute of Technology in Hyderabad, went to the US for higher studies and started an information technology consulting company before returning to India in 2008.

== Career ==
Anil Eravathri joined the newly formed Praja Rajyam Party of the actor Chiranjeevi in 2009, contested from Balkonda Assembly constituency in the Nizamabad district of Telangana, and won with a majority of 8159 votes in a three-way contest involving the Indian National Congress party and the Telangana Rashtra Samithi. The Indian National Congress party formed the government and PRP had to play the role of opposition in the Andhra Pradesh Assembly.

Anil Eravathri became a member of the Indian National Congress party after Chiranjeevi decided to merge his party Praja Rajyam Party with it in 2011. Anil Eravathri played a key role in the PRP and served as its general secretary of the state unit before its merger with the Congress party in 2012. He worked closely with the Congress party leaders for the benefit of the farming community and turmeric farmers of his constituency.

== Positions held ==
Position	Organization	Tenure
Government Whip	AP Legislative Assembly	(2012–2014)
Member, Balkonda Assembly Constituency	AP Legislative Assembly	(2009–2014)
General Secretary	Praja Rajyam party	(2010-2014)
