= Nizamabad Rural Assembly constituency =

Constituency of the Telangana legislative assembly in India

Coordinates: 18.690°N 78.12°E

Nizamabad (Rural)
- Constituency No. 18 for the Telangana Legislative Assembly
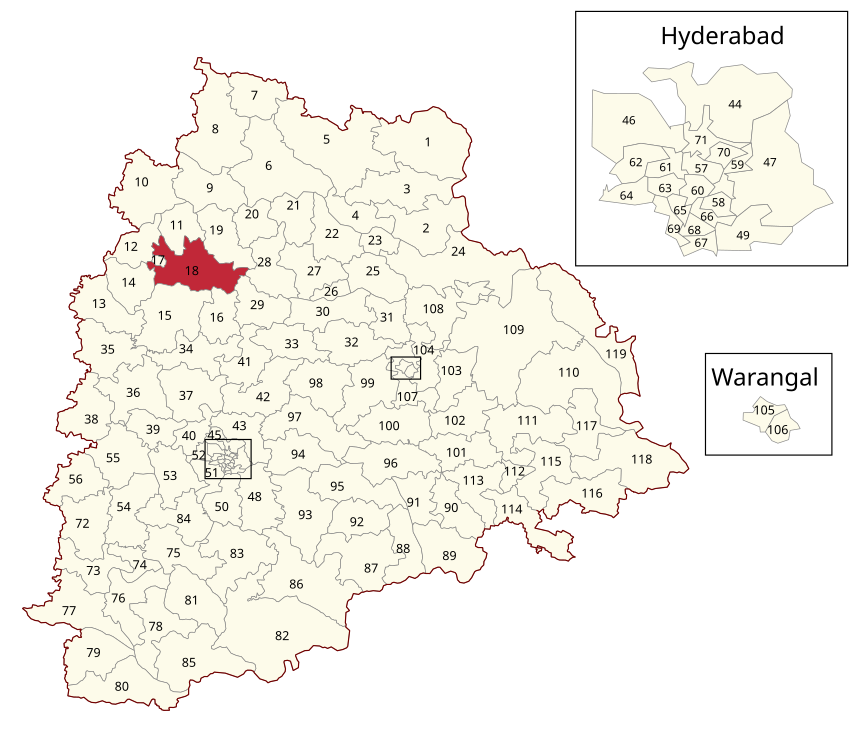
- Location of Nizamabad Rural Assembly constituency within Telangana

Constituency details
- Country: India
- Region: South India
- State: Telangana
- District: Nizamabad
- Lok Sabha constituency: Nizamabad
- Total electors: 1,94,625
- Reservation: None

Member of Legislative Assembly
- 3rd Telangana Legislative Assembly
- Incumbent Rekulapally Bhoopathi Reddy
- Party: Indian National Congress
- Elected year: 2023

Nizamabad (Rural) Assembly constituency is a constituency of Telangana Legislative Assembly, India. It is one among two constituencies in the city of Nizamabad with a population of 3,22,781. It is part of Nizamabad Lok Sabha constituency.

Rekulapally Bhoopathi Reddy of Indian National Congress is currently representing the constituency.

== Mandals ==
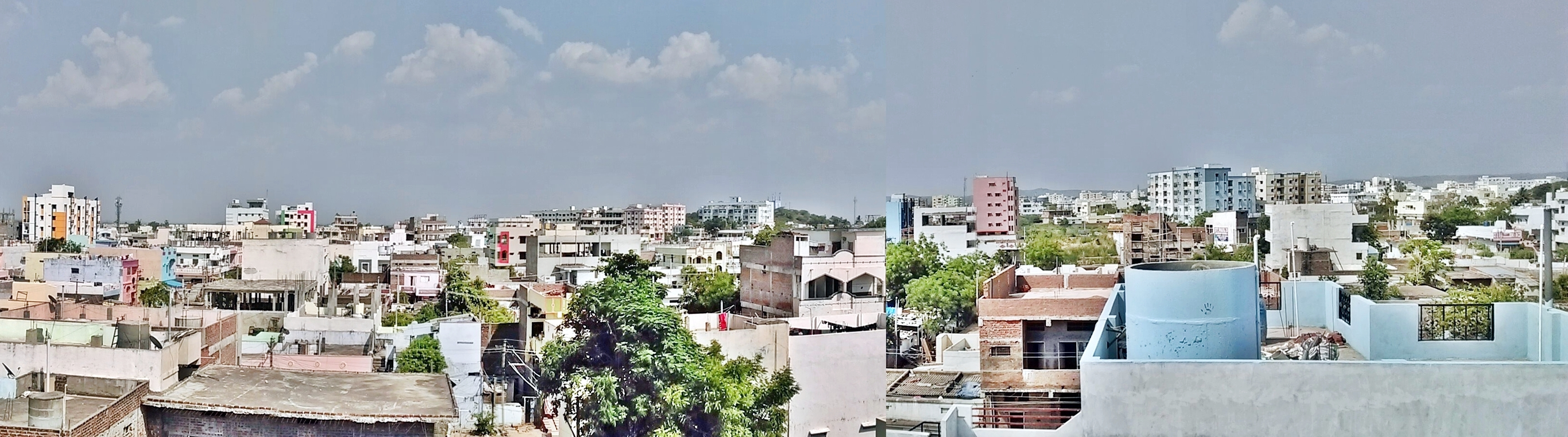
The eastern side of Nizamabad city comprises Gangastan Phase 1,2 and 3 and Chandrashekar Colony belonging to Nizamabad Rural.

The Assembly Constituency presently comprises the following Mandals:

Mandal
Nizamabad Rural
Jakranpally
Mopal
Indalwai
Sirkonda
Dichpalle
Dharpalle

== Members of Legislative Assembly Dichpally ==
Year	Member	Political party
Hyderabad State
1952	D. Srinivas Rao	Socialist Party
Andhra Pradesh
1978	Balreddy Anthareddy	Indian National Congress
1983	Mandava M. J. Thomas Chowdary	Telugu Desam Party
1985	Mandava Venkateshwara Rao	Telugu Desam Party
1989	Mandava Venkateshwara Rao	Telugu Desam Party
1994	Mandava Venkateshwara Rao	Telugu Desam Party
1999	Mandava Venkateshwara Rao	Telugu Desam Party
2004	Gaddam Ganga Reddy	Telangana Rashtra Samithi
2008 by-election	Akula Lalitha	Indian National Congress

== Members of Legislative Assembly Nizamabad (Rural) ==
Year	Member	Political party
Andhra Pradesh
2009	Mandava Venkateshwara Rao	Telugu Desam Party
Telangana
2014	Bajireddy Goverdhan	Telangana Rashtra Samithi
2018	Bajireddy Goverdhan	Telangana Rashtra Samithi
2023	Rekulapally Bhoopathi Reddy	Indian National Congress

== Election results ==
=== Telangana Legislative Assembly election, 2023 ===
Telangana Assembly Elections, 2023: Nizamabad Rural (Assembly constituency)
Party	Candidate	Votes	%	±%
INC	Rekulapally Bhoopathi Reddy	78,378	40.19	▲6.47
BRS	Bajireddy Goverdhan	56,415	28.93	▼21.93
BJP	Dinesh Kumar Kulachari	49,723	25.50	▲15.98
BSP	Mattamla Shekhar	2,293	1.18	
NOTA	None of the Above	2,268	1.16	
Majority		21,963	11.26	
Turnout		1,95,018	76.96	
INC gain from BRS		Swing		

=== Telangana Legislative Assembly election, 2018 ===
2018 Telangana Legislative Assembly election: Nizamabad Rural
Party	Candidate	Votes	%	±%
TRS	Bajireddy Goverdhan	87,976	50.86	
INC	Rekulapally Bhoopathi Reddy	58,330	33.72	
BJP	Anand Reddy Gaddam	16,467	9.52	
NOTA	None of the Above	2,203	1.27	
Majority		29,646	17.4	
Turnout		1,72,969	79.15	
TRS hold		Swing		

=== Telangana Legislative Assembly election, 2014 ===
Telangana Assembly Elections, 2014: Nizamabad (Rural) (Assembly constituency)
Party	Candidate	Votes	%	±%
TRS	Bajireddy Goverdhan	70,010	46.52	
INC	D. Srinivas	51,560	30.71	
BJP	Anand Reddy Gaddam	25,579	25.23	
Independent	Pitla Rama Krishna	1,696	1.01	
Majority		26,547	15.81	
Turnout		1,67,906	74.83	
TRS gain from TDP		Swing		

== See also ==
- Nizamabad (Urban) (Assembly constituency)
- List of constituencies of Telangana Legislative Assembly
