= Birkoor =

Coordinates: 18°29′01″N 77°48′01″E

- Village
- Interactive map of Birkoor
- Country: India
- State: Telangana

Languages
  - Official: Telugu
- Time zone: UTC+5:30 (IST)
- Vehicle registration: TS

Birkoor is a village in Nizamabad district in the state of Telangana in India. It has a population of 47,647 people.
