= Choutapally =

Choutapally Choutapalle
- Revenue village
- Location in Telangana, India
- Coordinates: 17.795746°N 79.709828°E
- Country: India
- State: Telangana
- District: Warangal district

Government
  - Type: Grama Panchayat
  - Body: (Sarpanch)

Population (2011)
  - Total: 3,119

Languages
  - Official: Telugu
- Time zone: UTC+5:30 (IST)
- Postal code: 506310
- Literacy: 52.94%

Choutapally is a revenue village in the Parvathagiri mandal of Warangal district, Telangana, India. It is located 25 km from district headquarters, Warangal, 170 kilometres (110 mi) from Hyderabad. The village is known for rice production and quarry mining.

== Agriculture ==
Rice cultivation is the major occupation of farmers. SRSP canals are the source of water for irrigation.

== Transport facility ==
Warangal is well connected by road and rail to the rest of the state and country. From Warangal autos and TSRTC buses are available to the village.

== Politics ==
Choutapally is a Gram Panchayat headed by a Sarpanch. It comes under Waradhanapet Assembly constituency.
