= Paidi Rakesh Reddy =

Indian politician

Member of the Telangana Legislative Assembly
- Incumbent
- Assumed office 2023
- Preceded by: Asannagari Jeevan Reddy

Paidi Rakesh Reddy (born 1967) is an Indian politician from Telangana state. He is a member of the Telangana Legislative Assembly from Armur constituency in Nizamabad district. He represents the Bharatiya Janata Party and was elected in the 2023 Telangana Legislative Assembly election.

== Early life and education ==
Reddy was born in Ankapur, Armur mandal, Nizamabad district. He is born to Paidi Ganga Reddy. In 1987, he started his career as a mason earning his livelihood as a labourer in UAE and later he worked as a driver, also in UAE. But he was a keen learner and soon he started his career as an entrepreneur. He later became a businessman and started exports of red sanders. He is a school dropout after passing Class 12. He studied till Class VIII at Zilla Parishad Boys High School, Armur, Nizamabad and discontinued in 1980. He was married to Bhudevi at a very young age in the form of child marriage and had a kid at 18 years old called Sucharitha, then 18 years after the death of Bhudevi, he remarried to Revathi and they have 2 children called Reyansh and Reha. They have started a family foundation named Rakesh Reddy Foundation and have been serving the people in the region through this non-profit organisation.

== Career ==
Reddy won the Armur Assembly constituency representing Bharatiya Janata Party in the 2023 Telangana Legislative Assembly election. He polled 72,658 votes and defeated his nearest rival, Prodduturi Vinay Kumar Reddy of Indian National Congress by a huge margin of 29,669 votes.
