= Armur Assembly constituency =

Constituency of the Telangana legislative assembly in India

Coordinates: 18.79°N 78.29°E

Armur
- Constituency No. 11 for the Telangana Legislative Assembly
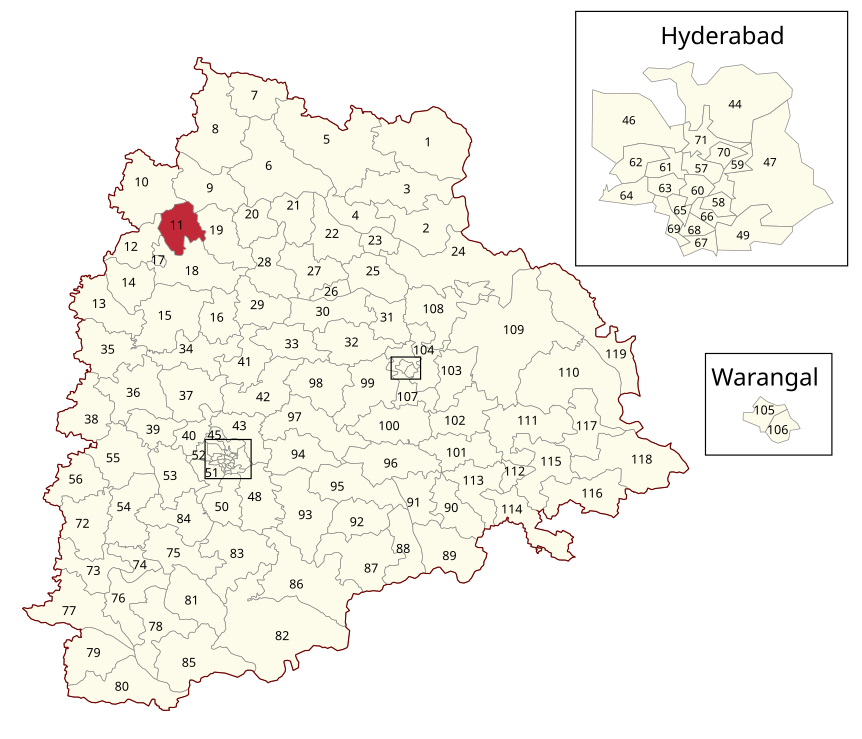
- Location of Armur Assembly constituency within Telangana

Constituency details
- Country: India
- Region: South India
- State: Telangana
- District: Nizamabad
- Lok Sabha constituency: Nizamabad
- Established: 1951
- Total electors: 1,61,826
- Reservation: None

Member of Legislative Assembly
- 3rd Telangana Legislative Assembly
- Incumbent Paidi Rakesh Reddy
- Party: Bharatiya Janata Party
- Elected year: 2023

Armur Assembly constituency is a constituency of the Telangana Legislative Assembly, India. It is one of the five constituencies in Nizamabad district. It is part of Nizamabad Lok Sabha constituency.

Paidi Rakesh Reddy of Bharatiya Janata Party is representing the constituency.

== Mandals ==
The assembly constituency presently comprises the following mandals:

Mandal
Armur
Nandipet
Makloor
Aloor
Donkeshwar

== Members of the Legislative Assembly ==
Election	Member	Party
1952	G. Raja Ram	Samajwadi Party
1957	T. Anjaiah	Indian National Congress
1962	Tummala Rangareddy	Indian National Congress
1967	Tummala Rangareddy	Indian National Congress
1972	Tummala Rangareddy	Indian National Congress
1978	Sanigaram Santosh Reddy	Indian National Congress
1983	Sanigaram Santosh Reddy	Indian National Congress
1985	Aleti Mahipal Reddy	Telugu Desam Party
1989	Sanigaram Santosh Reddy	Indian National Congress
1994	Aleti Annapurna Devi	Telugu Desam Party
1999	Bajireddy Goverdhan	Indian National Congress
2004	Sanigaram Santosh Reddy	Bharat Rashtra Samithi
2009	Aleti Annapurna Devi	Telugu Desam Party
2014	Asannagari Jeevan Reddy	Bharat Rashtra Samithi
2018	Asannagari Jeevan Reddy	Bharat Rashtra Samithi
2023	Paidi Rakesh Reddy	Bharatiya Janata Party

Hyderabad State
Andhra Pradesh

== Election results ==
=== Assembly Election 2023 ===
2023 Telangana Legislative Assembly election : Armur
Party	Candidate	Votes	%	±%
BJP	Paidi Rakesh Reddy	72,658	44.90%	▲30.77
INC	Prodduturi Vinay Kumar Reddy	42,989	26.56%	▼4.67
BRS	Asannagari Jeevan Reddy	39,395	24.34%	New
NOTA	None of the above	1,499	0.93%	▼0.26
Dharma Samaj Party	Cheruku Prem Kumar	1,477	0.91%	New
BSP	Gandikota Rajanna	1,390	0.86%	▼0.38
Margin of victory		29,669	18.33%	▼2.42
Turnout		161,991	77.01%	▼2.08
Total valid votes		161,826		
Registered electors		210,341		▲18.48
BJP gain from BRS		Swing	▼7.09	

=== Assembly Election 2018 ===
2018 Telangana Legislative Assembly election : Armur
Party	Candidate	Votes	%	±%
BRS	Asannagari Jeevan Reddy	72,125	51.99%	▲1.72
INC	Akula Lalitha	43,330	31.23%	▼8.65
BJP	Prodduturi Vinay Kumar Reddy	19,599	14.13%	New
BSP	Komirey Sudhakar	1,724	1.24%	▲0.16
NOTA	None of the above	1,657	1.19%	▲0.11
Margin of victory		28,795	20.75%	▲10.36
Turnout		140,420	79.09%	▲4.72
Total valid votes		138,740		
Registered electors		177,537		▼2.89
BRS hold		Swing	▲1.72	

=== Assembly Election 2014 ===
2014 Telangana Legislative Assembly election : Armur
Party	Candidate	Votes	%	±%
BRS	Asannagari Jeevan Reddy	67,555	50.27%	New
INC	K. R. Suresh Reddy	53,591	39.88%	▲10.13
TDP	Rajaram Dodolla	7,528	5.60%	▼34.96
BSP	Koppu Rajaiah	1,456	1.08%	▲0.26
NOTA	None of the above	1,445	1.08%	New
Pyramid Party of India	Anjaiah Kondani	1,362	1.01%	▼0.02
Independent	Laxmi Prasanna	1,271	0.95%	New
RPI(A)	Talari Satyam	1,135	0.84%	New
Margin of victory		13,964	10.39%	▼0.42
Turnout		135,970	74.37%	▲0.46
Total valid votes		134,383		
Registered electors		182,821		▲11.71
BRS gain from TDP		Swing	▲9.71	

=== Assembly Election 2009 ===
2009 Andhra Pradesh Legislative Assembly election : Armur
Party	Candidate	Votes	%	±%
TDP	Aleti Annapurna Devi	49,009	40.56%	▼3.01
INC	K. R. Suresh Reddy	35,950	29.75%	New
PRP	Baddam Madhu Shekhar	21,335	17.66%	New
BJP	Aljapur Srinivas	7,544	6.24%	New
LSP	Krishna Bokkena	1,834	1.52%	New
Independent	Vijay Kumar Gatadi	1,465	1.21%	New
Pyramid Party of India	Mukka Satyanarayana	1,240	1.03%	▼3.84
BSP	Mothkuri Linga Goud	985	0.82%	New
Independent	Regulla Sathyanarayana	889	0.74%	New
Margin of victory		13,059	10.81%	▲5.39
Turnout		120,964	73.91%	▲5.65
Total valid votes		120,822		
Registered electors		163,658		▼7.72
TDP gain from BRS		Swing	▼8.43	

=== Assembly Election 2004 ===
2004 Andhra Pradesh Legislative Assembly election : Armoor
Party	Candidate	Votes	%	±%
BRS	Sanigaram Santosh Reddy	59,274	48.99%	New
TDP	Aleti Annapurna Devi	52,719	43.57%	▲3.48
Pyramid Party of India	Kotapati Purna Chnadra Naidu	5,897	4.87%	New
Independent	B. Devaram	3,293	2.72%	New
Margin of victory		6,555	5.42%	▼14.06
Turnout		121,054	68.26%	▼1.05
Total valid votes		120,994		
Rejected ballots		60	0.05%	▼3.04
Registered electors		177,351		▼1.95
BRS gain from INC		Swing	▼10.58	

=== Assembly Election 1999 ===
1999 Andhra Pradesh Legislative Assembly election : Armoor
Party	Candidate	Votes	%	±%
INC	Bajireddy Goverdhan	72,378	59.57%	▲42.38
TDP	Aleti Annapurna Devi	48,705	40.09%	▼2.85
Margin of victory		23,673	19.48%	▲6.82
Turnout		125,374	69.31%	▼1.70
Total valid votes		121,499		
Rejected ballots		3,875	3.09%	▲0.77
Registered electors		180,876		▲13.07
INC gain from TDP		Swing	▲16.63	

=== Assembly Election 1994 ===
1994 Andhra Pradesh Legislative Assembly election : Armoor
Party	Candidate	Votes	%	±%
TDP	Aleti Annapurna Devi	47,641	42.94%	▲0.92
Independent	Bajireddy Goverdhan	33,598	30.28%	New
INC	Sanigaram Santosh Reddy	19,077	17.19%	▼36.69
BJP	Aljapur Srinivas	6,573	5.92%	New
Independent	Boliam Devaram	1,499	1.35%	New
Independent	Pothnoor Gangagoud	998	0.90%	New
Independent	Kokkula Gangadhar	800	0.72%	New
BSP	Mohd. Fashiruddin	774	0.70%	New
Margin of victory		14,043	12.66%	▲0.80
Turnout		113,595	71.01%	▲5.44
Total valid votes		110,960		
Rejected ballots		2,635	2.32%	▼1.69
Registered electors		159,962		▲4.56
TDP gain from INC		Swing	▼10.94	

=== Assembly Election 1989 ===
1989 Andhra Pradesh Legislative Assembly election : Armoor
Party	Candidate	Votes	%	±%
INC	Sanigaram Santosh Reddy	51,881	53.88%	▲11.47
TDP	Vemula Serender Reddy	40,460	42.02%	▼8.33
Independent	Bompalli Sudershan	2,277	2.36%	New
Independent	A. Narayana	698	0.72%	New
Independent	Pothnoor Gangagoud	597	0.62%	New
Margin of victory		11,421	11.86%	▲3.92
Turnout		100,316	65.57%	▼4.41
Total valid votes		96,295		
Rejected ballots		4,021	4.01%	▲2.15
Registered electors		152,986		▲26.29
INC gain from TDP		Swing	▲3.53	

=== Assembly Election 1985 ===
1985 Andhra Pradesh Legislative Assembly election : Armoor
Party	Candidate	Votes	%	±%
TDP	Aleti Mahipal Reddy	41,893	50.35%	New
INC	Sanigaram Santosh Reddy	35,285	42.41%	▼8.90
Independent	Karnati Yadagiri	3,658	4.40%	New
Independent	Gaddam Erranna	1,634	1.96%	New
Independent	Jagidi Ramuloo	733	0.88%	New
Margin of victory		6,608	7.94%	▼0.43
Turnout		84,776	69.98%	▲2.27
Total valid votes		83,203		
Rejected ballots		1,573	1.86%	▼0.90
Registered electors		121,137		▲20.17
TDP gain from INC		Swing	▼0.96	

=== Assembly Election 1983 ===
1983 Andhra Pradesh Legislative Assembly election : Armoor
Party	Candidate	Votes	%	±%
INC	Sanigaram Santosh Reddy	34,053	51.31%	▲47.29
Independent	Aleti Mahipal Reddy	28,497	42.94%	New
Independent	Macherla Venkareshwar Reddy (Alias) Naveen	2,152	3.24%	New
Independent	Gaddam Hanmandlu	1,668	2.51%	New
Margin of victory		5,556	8.37%	▼39.92
Turnout		68,255	67.71%	▼6.42
Total valid votes		66,370		
Rejected ballots		1,885	2.76%	▼0.32
Registered electors		100,803		▲9.78
INC gain from INC(I)		Swing	▼16.34	

=== Assembly Election 1978 ===
1978 Andhra Pradesh Legislative Assembly election : Armoor
Party	Candidate	Votes	%	±%
INC(I)	Sanigaram Santosh Reddy	44,628	67.65%	New
JP	Govind Reddy. K. R	12,771	19.36%	New
Independent	Sudershan Rao	3,940	5.97%	New
INC	Alla Rajveer	2,654	4.02%	▼58.81
Independent	Jangiti Raja Rao	1,980	3.00%	New
Margin of victory		31,857	48.29%	▲6.23
Turnout		68,068	74.13%	▲24.79
Total valid votes		65,973		
Rejected ballots		2,095	3.08%	▲3.08
Registered electors		91,821		▲1.54
INC(I) gain from INC		Swing	▲4.82	

=== Assembly Election 1972 ===
1972 Andhra Pradesh Legislative Assembly election : Armoor
Party	Candidate	Votes	%	±%
INC	Tummala Rangareddy	26,952	62.83%	▲1.13
Independent	Sudershan Rao	8,910	20.77%	New
ABJS	Gadam Rajeshwar Reddy	7,032	16.39%	New
Margin of victory		18,042	42.06%	▲18.66
Turnout		44,617	49.34%	▼9.51
Total valid votes		42,894		
Registered electors		90,431		▲22.41
INC hold		Swing	▲1.13	

=== Assembly Election 1967 ===
1967 Andhra Pradesh Legislative Assembly election : Armoor
Party	Candidate	Votes	%	±%
INC	Tummala Rangareddy	25,399	61.70%	New
Independent	G. S. Rao	15,767	38.30%	New
Margin of victory		9,632	23.40%	
Turnout		43,479	58.85%	
Total valid votes		41,166		
Registered electors		73,878		
INC hold		Swing		

=== Assembly Election 1962 ===
1962 Andhra Pradesh Legislative Assembly election : Armoor
Party	Candidate	Votes	%	±%
INC	Tummala Rangareddy	Unopposed		
Registered electors		65,009		▲24.54
INC hold		Swing		

=== Assembly Election 1957 ===
1957 Andhra Pradesh Legislative Assembly election : Armoor
Party	Candidate	Votes	%	±%
INC	T. Anjaiah	15,454	48.65%	▲8.20
Independent	M. Narayan Reddy	8,825	27.78%	New
Independent	Narsimha Reddy Dubbake	3,812	12.00%	New
KSP	Narsimloo	3,676	11.57%	New
Margin of victory		6,629	20.87%	▲1.77
Turnout		31,767	60.86%	▲10.52
Total valid votes		31,767		
Registered electors		52,198		▲4.17
INC gain from SP		Swing	▼10.90	

=== Assembly Election 1952 ===
1952 Hyderabad State Legislative Assembly election : Armoor
Party	Candidate	Votes	%	±%
SP	G. Raja Ram	15,022	59.55%	New
INC	K. R. Hanamanth Reddy	10,204	40.45%	New
Margin of victory		4,818	19.10%	
Turnout		25,226	50.34%	
Total valid votes		25,226		
Registered electors		50,107		
SP win (new seat)				

== See also ==
- List of constituencies of Telangana Legislative Assembly
