= Rekulapally Bhoopathi Reddy =

Indian politician

Member of the Telangana Legislative Assembly
- Incumbent
- Assumed office 2023
- Preceded by: Bajireddy Goverdhan

Personal details
- Party: Indian National Congress

Rekulapally Bhoopathi Reddy (born 1964) is an Indian politician from Telangana state. He is a member of the Telangana Legislative Assembly from Nizamabad Rural Assembly constituency in Nizamabad district. He represents Indian National Congress and won the 2023 Telangana Legislative Assembly election.

== Early life and education ==
Reddy is from Nizamabad. He is born to Rekulapally Raja Reddy. He completed his M.S. in Orthopaedics in 1993 from Osmania Medical College, Dr. NTR University of Health Sciences, Vijayawada.

== Career ==
Reddy won from Nizamabad Rural Assembly constituency representing Indian National Congress in the 2023 Telangana Legislative Assembly election. He polled 78,378 votes and defeated his nearest rival, Bajireddy Goverdhan of Bharat Rashtra Samithi by a margin of 21,963 votes. Earlier in the 2018 Telangana Legislative Assembly election, he lost to Bajireddy Goverdhan of Telangana Rashtra Samithi.
