= Dhanpal Suryanarayana Gupta =

Indian politician

Member of the Telangana Legislative Assembly
- Incumbent
- Assumed office 2023

Personal details
- Party: Bharatiya Janata Party

Dhanpal Suryanarayana Gupta (born 1958) is an Indian politician from Telangana state. He is a member of the Telangana Legislative Assembly from Nizamabad Urban Assembly constituency in Nizamabad district. He represented Bharatiya Janata Party and was elected as an MLA in the 2023 Telangana Legislative Assembly election.

== Early life and education ==
Gupta is from Nizamabad, Telangana. His father is Dhanpal Vittal. He did his B.Com. in 1979 at Mandhumalancha Degree College, Bodhan, which is affiliated with Osmania University.

== Career ==
Gupta served as the BJP's state executive committee member and was nominated to contest the Nizamabad Urban seat and was backed by the area's Member of Parliament Dharmapuri Arvind. He was elected from Nizamabad Urban constituency representing the Bharatiya Janata Party in the 2023 Telangana Legislative Assembly election. He polled 75,240 votes and defeated his nearest rival, Mohammed Ali Shabbir of Indian National Congress by a margin of 15,387 votes. He first contested on the BJP ticket in the 2014 Telangana Legislative Assembly election but could only finish third behind winner, Bigala Ganesh of the Telangana Rashtra Samithi and Mir Majaz Ali Shaik of the All India Majlis-e-Ittehadul Muslimeen. He polled 28,301 votes while Ganesh got 42,148 votes.
