= Vemula Prashanth Reddy =

Indian politician

Minister of Roads and Buildings, Legislative Affairs & Housing Government of Telangana
- In office 8 September 2019 – 6 December 2023
- Governor: Tamilisai Soundararajan
- Chief Minister: K. Chandrashekar Rao
- Preceded by: T. Harish Rao (Legislative Affairs); Thummala Nageshwar Rao (Housing Department)
- Succeeded by: Komatireddy Venkat Reddy (Roads & Buildings); D. Sridhar Babu (Legislative Affairs); Ponguleti Srinivas Reddy (Housing)

Member of Telangana Legislative Assembly
- Incumbent
- Assumed office 2 June 2014
- Preceded by: Anil Kumar Eravathri
- Constituency: Balkonda

Personal details
- Born: 14 March 1966 (age 60) Velpur
- Party: Bharat Rashtra Samithi

Vemula Prashanth Reddy is an Indian politician formerly serving as the Minister of Roads, Buildings and Legislative Affairs & Housing Department of Telangana since 8 September 2019. He is a Member of Telangana Legislative Assembly from Balkonda constituency from 2 June 2014.

He is the member of the Bharat Rashtra Samithi (BRS) Party and the Member of the Legislative Assembly (MLA) of the Balkonda constituency of Nizamabad district, Telangana.
