= Tadpakal =

- village
- Location in Telangana, India Tadpakal (India)
- Coordinates: 18.9456°N 78.4631°E
- Country: India
- State: Telangana
- District: Nizamabad
- Elevation: 424 m (1,391 ft)

Population
  - Total: 1,924

Languages
  - Official: Telugu
- Time zone: IST

Tadpakal is a village in Yergatla Mandal, Nizamabad district of Telangana in southern India. It sits by the Godavari River. Tadpakal or Tadapakala name is derived from TallaPaaka (i.e PalmHut / PalmHoveel), during the 1900 to 1940 there were more Palmhuts in this village

== Pushkaram festival ==
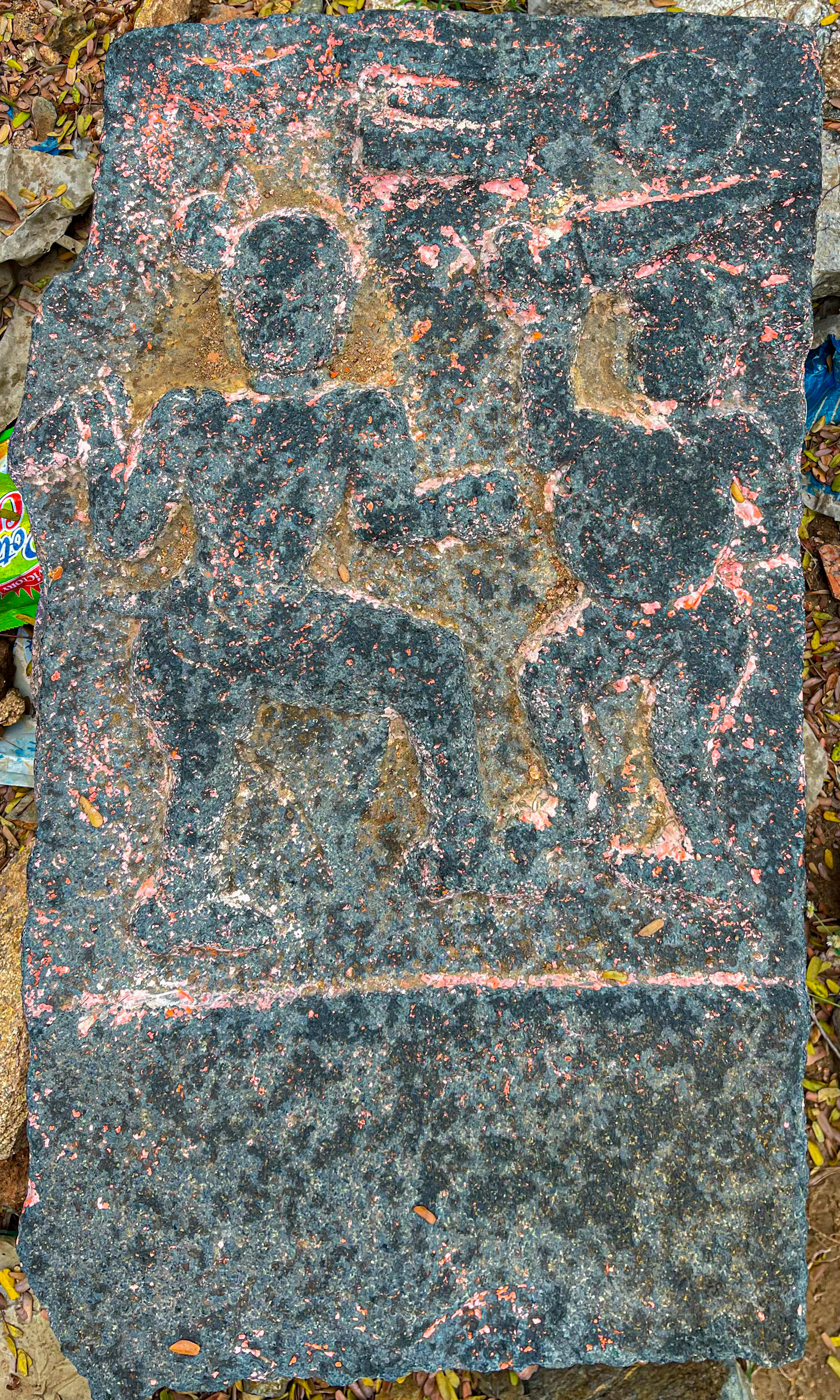
Veeragal in Tadpakal

There is a veeragal or Hero stone found on the bank of river Godavari which depicts fighting of two warriors with swords and there are the symbols of Shiva linga, Sun and Moon on the upper side of it. Tadpakal Pushkaram is part of the Godavari Pushkaram festival that occurs annually all along the Godavari river.

Many people including pilgrims, scholars and political leaders bathe in the river at Tadpakal. Bathers believe that this holy practice will relieve them of sins and restore health.

In 2002 the chief minister of Andhra Pradesh visited Tadpakal and made arrangements for the upcoming festival.
