= Gulakamale =

- Village
- Location in Karnataka, India
- Coordinates: 12.798°N 77.529°E
- Country: India
- State: Karnataka
- District: Bangalore
- Talukas: Bangalore South

Government
  - Type: Panchayati raj
  - Body: Sarpanch

Population (2011)
  - Total: 2,293

Languages
  - Official: Kannada
- Time zone: UTC+5:30 (IST)
- PIN: 560082
- literacy rate: 71.82
- Lok Sabha constituency: Bangalore Rural

Gulakamale is a village in Bangalore district, Karnataka, India, near Kaggalipura on Bangalore – Kanakapura Road. The population of the village is 2,293 which made up of 1,131 males and 1,162 females. The literacy rate is lower than that of Karnataka and stands at 71.82% as opposed to 75.36% of the rest of the state. Out of those who are literate are 81.05% male and 62.70% female populations. Scheduled Castes and Tribes make up 51.72% and 0.22% respectively.

== History of Gulakamale ==
The documented history of Gulakamale can be dated back to the 14th century CE in which the name of the village is recorded as Gulakamari in the Kempanna herostone-inscription. This inscription documents that a Kempanna died during a fight in Gulakamari and the memorial stone was installed by his brother Kariyappa. Another inscription, Singappan & Nattavar Donation Inscription, is documented in Gulakamale which records a donation by a Singappan and Nattavar of Ponmani who granted grains or food offerings (Amudhu-padi) to a Vishnu temple.

== See also ==
- Gulakamale (Bengaluru) inscriptions
