= Gulakamale inscriptions and hero stones =

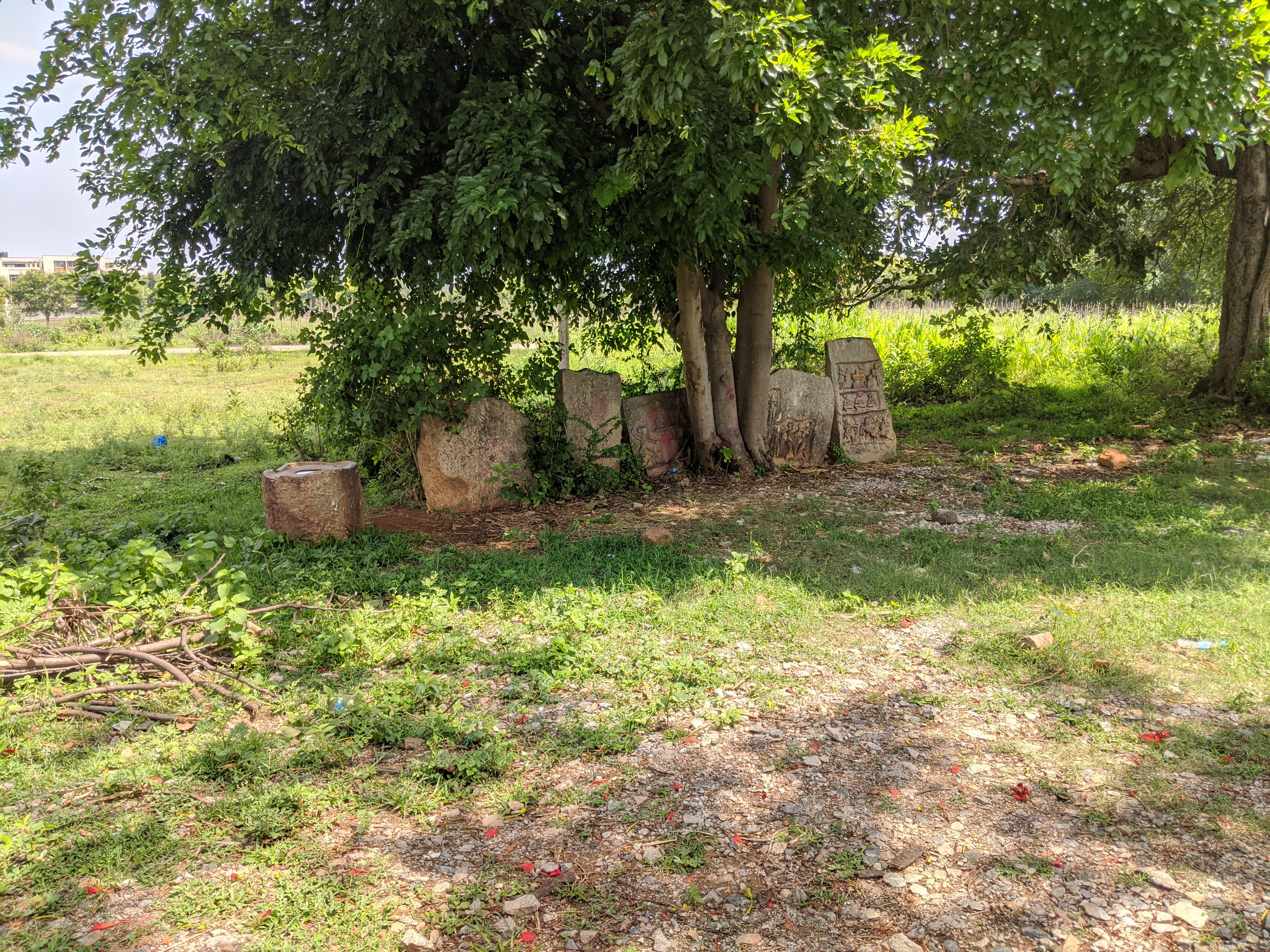
Gulakamale Kannada and Tamil Inscriptions

Gulakamale is located in Bangalore South taluk of Bangalore district in Karnataka, India. Two inscriptions are found in Gulakamale of which one is a donation inscription, and the other, a Mahasati herostone, a typology of herostones dedicated to women who self-sacrificed in sati. Additionally, two other hero stones are also found at the same place. Gulakamale is also famous for its lake, a birding hotspot on the city's outskirts.

The Mahasati hero-stone inscription and the donation inscription mention a Gulakamari-Gulakama which today is known as Gulakamale.

== Gulakamale 14th-century Singappan & Nattavar Donation Inscription ==
The Gulakamale 14th-century Singappan & Nattavar Donation Tamil Inscription
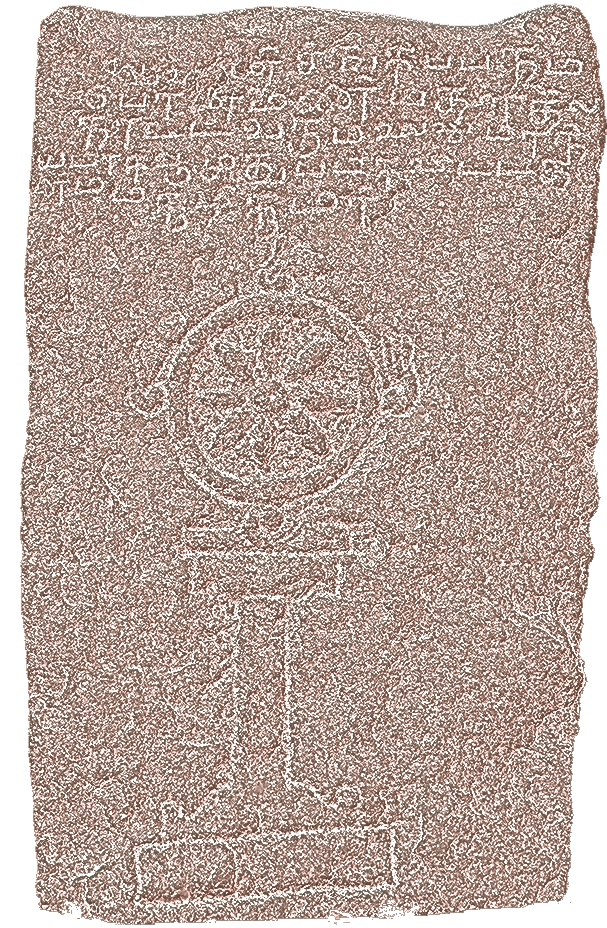
- Digital Image Obtained by 3D Scanning of The Gulakamale 14th-century Singappan & Nattavar Donation Tamil Inscription
- Material: Stone
- Height: 118 cm (46 in)
- Width: 73 cm (29 in)
- Writing: Grantha
- Created: 14th Century
- Discovered: 2022
- Discovered by: The Mythic Society-Bengaluru Inscriptions 3D Digital Conservation Project
- Present location: 12.802083°N 77.530444°E
- Language: Tamil

It is a Tamil language inscription is written in Grantha and Tamil scripts dated to the 14th century CE.The inscription records that a Singappan and Nattavar of Ponmani, granted grains or food offerings (Amudhu-padi) to a Vishnu temple. The term "Kuzhiku Ma" used in the inscription is ambiguous and could mean a land measurement unit or a Tamilized- version for Gulakama. The inscription was discovered on 7 July 2020 by the Mythic Society Bengaluru Inscriptions 3-D digital conservation team.

=== Physical characteristics ===
The inscription is carved on locally available granite stone. The inscription measures 118 cm in height and 73 cm in width. The characters are 3.7 cm tall, 7 cm wide, and 0.4 cm deep. Below the inscription, a Sudarshana Chakra, a symbol associated with Vishnu, is engraved signifying a donation made to a Vishnu temple.

=== Transliteration of the Inscription ===
The transliteration of the inscription in modern Tamil, Kannada and IAST.

sl no.	Tamil Transliteration	Kannada Transliteration	ISAT
1.	ஸ்வஸ்தி ஸ்ரீ சிங்கப்பநும்	ಸ್ವಸ್ತಿ ಶ್ರೀ ಸಿಂಗಪ್ಪನುಮ್	Svasti srī siṅgappanum
2.	பொன் மணிய் தள(த்)தில்	ಪೊನ್ ಮನಿ ತಲ(ತ)ತಿಳ್	Peṉ maṇiy taḷa(t)til
3.	நாட்டவரும் சகல மாநி	ನಾಟವರುಮ್ ಸಗಲ ಮಾನಿ	Nāṭṭavarum sakala māni
4.	யமாக ஆமுது படிகு விட்டத	ಯಮಾಗ ಆಮುದು ಪಡಿಕು ವಿಟ್ಟದೆ	Yamāga āmudu padiki viṭṭa da
5.	ன்மம் குழிகு மா	ನ್ಮಮ ಕುಳಿಕು ಮಾ	Ṉmam kuḻiku mā

== Gulakamale 14th century Kempanna hero stone inscription ==
It is a Kannada inscription paleographically dated to the 14th century CE. The ambiguity of the text imposes a restriction on its reading, however it seems to say that a Kempanna died during a fight in Gulakamari (Gulakamale) and the memorial stone was installed by his brother Kariyappa. There are other people Kanneyanayaka and Santa mentioned in the inscription whose roles are unclear. The memorial stone is a Viramasti memorial stone as the figure of a lady is also carved on the stone probably to indicating her to be Kempanna's wife.The Gulakamale 14th century Kempanna Mahasati herostone inscription was discovered on 7 July 2020 by the Mythic Society Bengaluru Inscriptions 3 D digital conservation team. Subsequently, based on the 3D digital models same team has published the text of this inscription.

The Gulakamale 14th-century Kempanna Hero-stone with Inscription
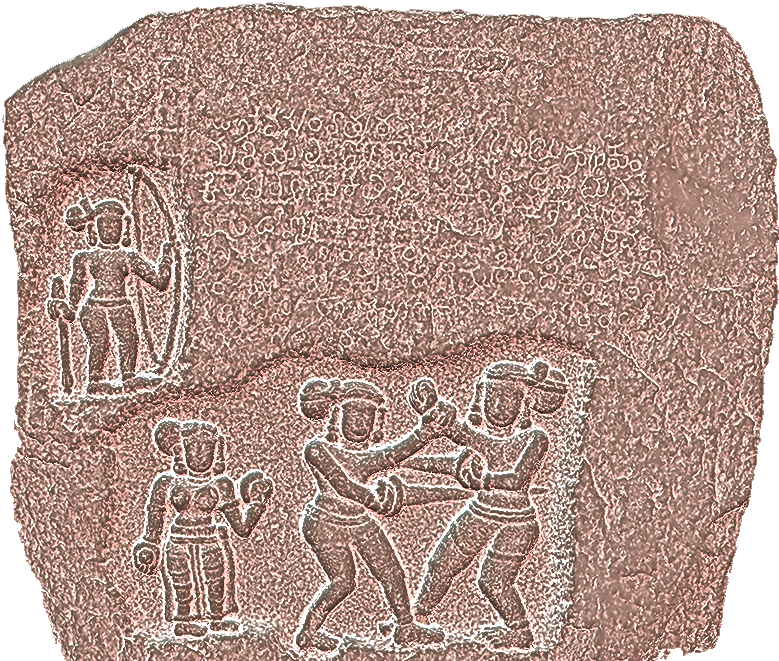
- The Gulakamale 14th-century Kempanna Hero-stone with Inscription
- Material: Stone
- Height: 109 cm (43 in)
- Width: 118 cm (46 in)
- Writing: Kannada
- Created: 14th Century
- Discovered: 2022
- Discovered by: The Mythic Society-Bengaluru Inscriptions 3D Digital Conservation Project
- Present location: 12.802083°N 77.530444°E
- Language: Kannada

=== Physical characteristics ===
The inscription measures 109 cm tall and 118 cm wide cm in width. The characters are 3.7 cm tall, 3.3 cm wide and 0.3 cm deep.

=== Transliteration of the Inscription ===
The transliteration is published in the Quaternary Journal of the mythic society.

SL NO.	Kannada Transliteration	ISAT
1.	ವಿಭವ ಸಂವತ್ಸರದ ಪುಷ್ಯ ಬ ೧ ಲು ಗುಳುಕುಂ	vibhava saṃvatsarada puṣya ba 1 lu gul̤ukuṃ
2.	ಮರಿಯಲಿ . . ಸ . . . . ಸಂಥನ ಮಗ	mariyali . . sa . . . . saṃthana maga
3.	ಕೆಂಪಂಣನು ಕಿತಿನೆಲಗೆ ಕಂನೆಯನಾಯಕನ	kĕṃpaṃṇanu kitinĕlagĕ kaṃnĕyanāyakana
4.	ವರು ಡಿಣ್ಯ . ಮ . . ಯ ಮಾಲತಿ ವಂ	varu ḍiṇya . ma . . ya mālati vaṃ
5.	ಸಲ . ದವರು ಬಂದು ಕಂನೆಯನಾಯ್ಕರ ವಗಲಾಗಿ	sala . davaru baṃdu kaṃnĕyanāykara vagalāgi
6.	ಕಂನೆಯನಾಯ್ಕರ ಕುದುರೆಗೆ ಮುರಾಂದೆ ಕೆಂಪಂಣ	kaṃnĕyanāykara kudurĕgĕ murāṃdĕ kĕṃpaṃṇa
7.	ನು ಬಿದ್ದನು . ಬಿಳಲಾಗಿ ಅವರ ಅಂಣ ಕರಿಯಪ್ಪ	nu biddanu . bil̤alāgi avara aṃṇa kariyappa
8.	ಮಾಡಿಸಿದ ವಿರಗಲು	māḍisida viragalu

== Gallery ==
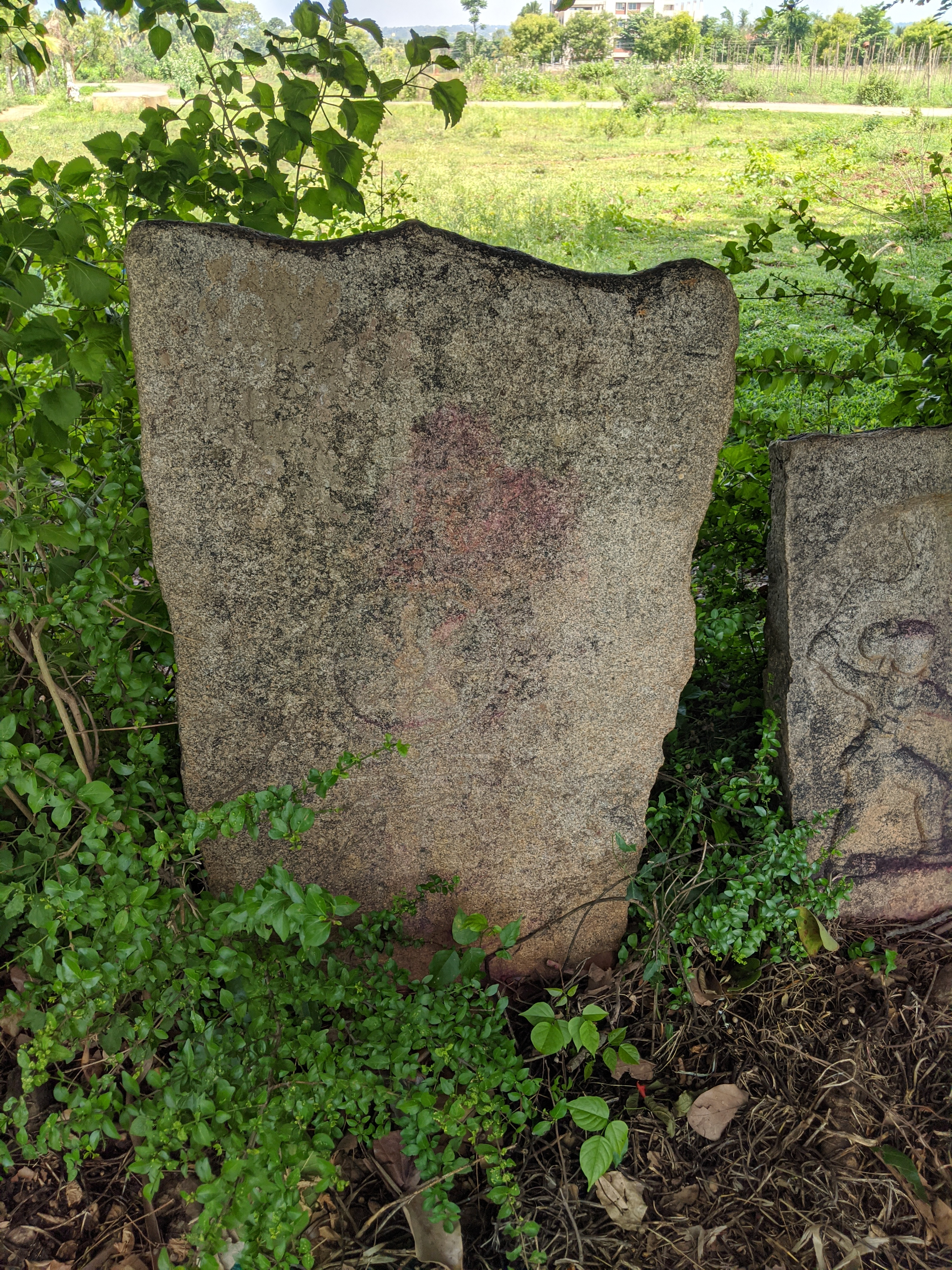
Close view of The Gulakamale 14th-century Singappan & Nattavar Donation Tamil Inscription

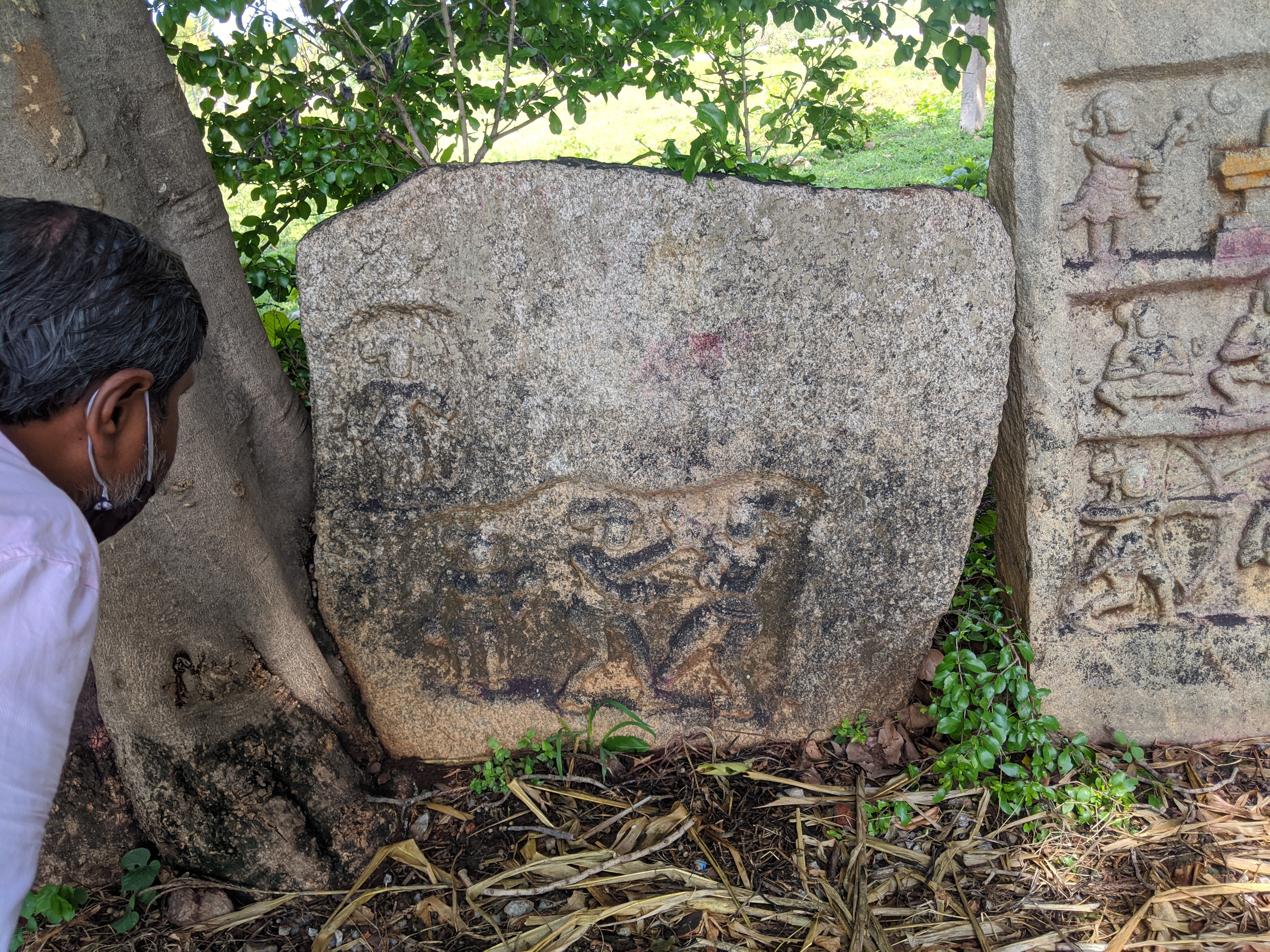
Close View of the Gulakamale 14th-century Kempanna Hero-stone

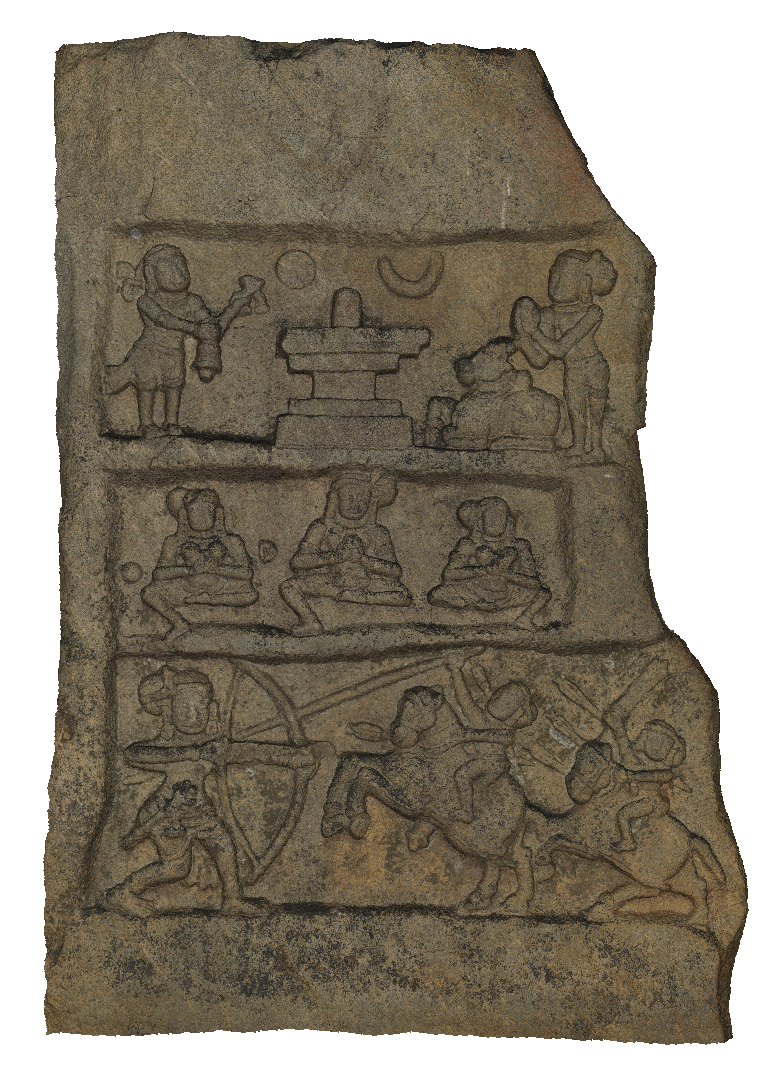
Digital Images of the Gulakamale Skirmish Herostone dating to 14-5th Century

== See also ==
- History of Bangalore
- Indian inscriptions
