= Hero stone =

Indian historic commemoration stones

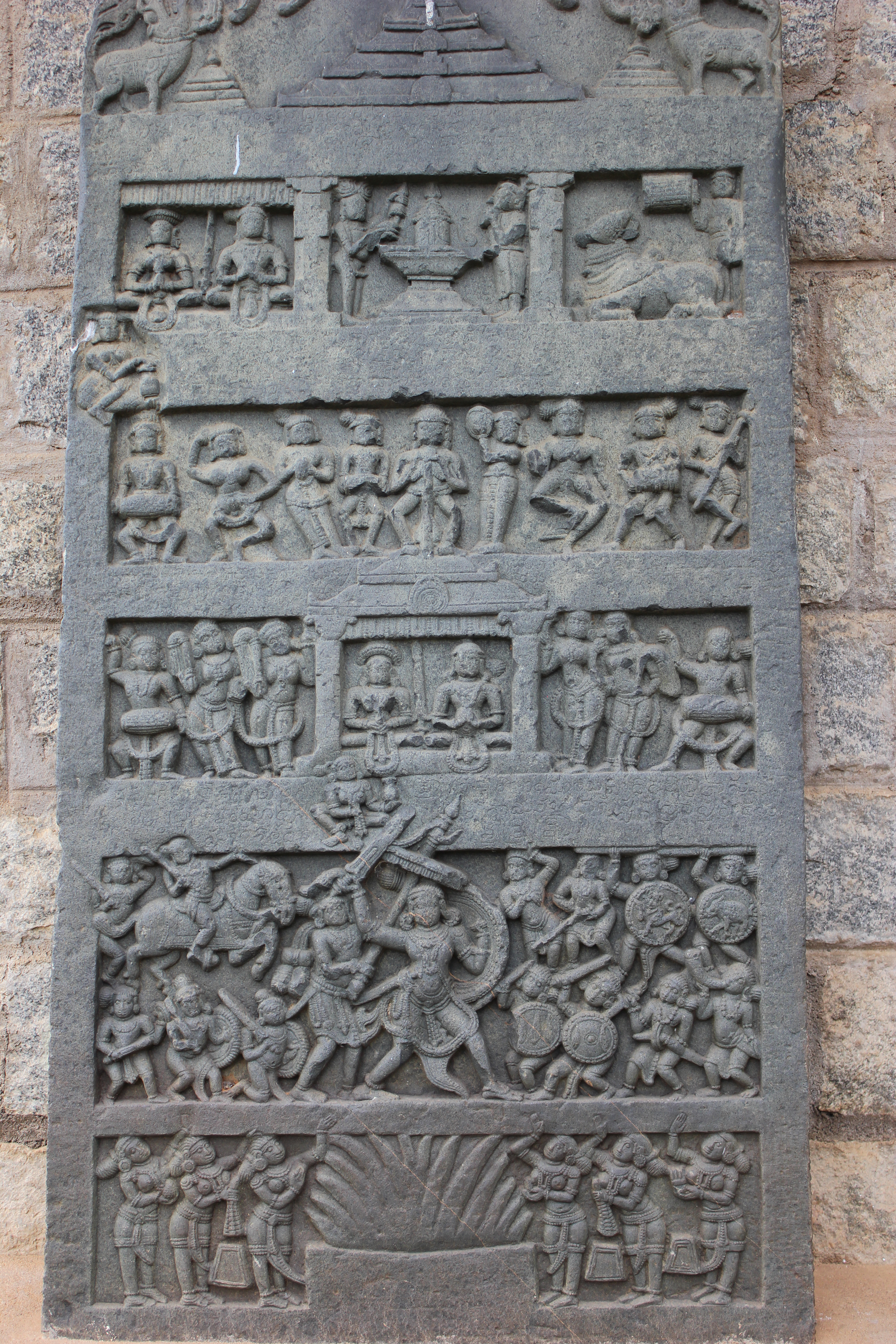
A hero stone with Old Kannada inscription of 1286 CE during the rule of Yadava King Ramachandra in the Kedareshvara Temple, Balligavi in Shimoga district, Karnataka

A hero stone (vīragallu in Kannada and Telugu, naṭukal in Tamil) is a memorial commemorating the honorable death of a hero in battle. Most of which were erected between the second half of the first millennium BCE and the 18th century CE, hero stones are found all over India. They often carry inscriptions and a variety of ornaments, including bas relief panels, frieze, and figures in carved stone. Usually they are in the form of a stone monument and may have an inscription at the bottom with a narrative of the battle. The earliest and oldest of such memorial hero stones is found in the Indian state of Tamil Nadu is more than 2400 years old that is 4th century BCE. According to the historian Upinder Singh, the largest concentration of such memorial stones is found in the Indian state of Karnataka. About two thousand six hundred and fifty hero stones, the earliest in Karnataka is dated to the 5th century CE. The custom of erecting memorial stones dates back to the Iron Age (400 BCE) though a vast majority were erected between the 4th century BCE to 13th centuries CE. Hero-stones also exist in the Himachal Pradesh region, such as in Chamba, where they are known locally as autar dating back to 13th century.

== Description ==
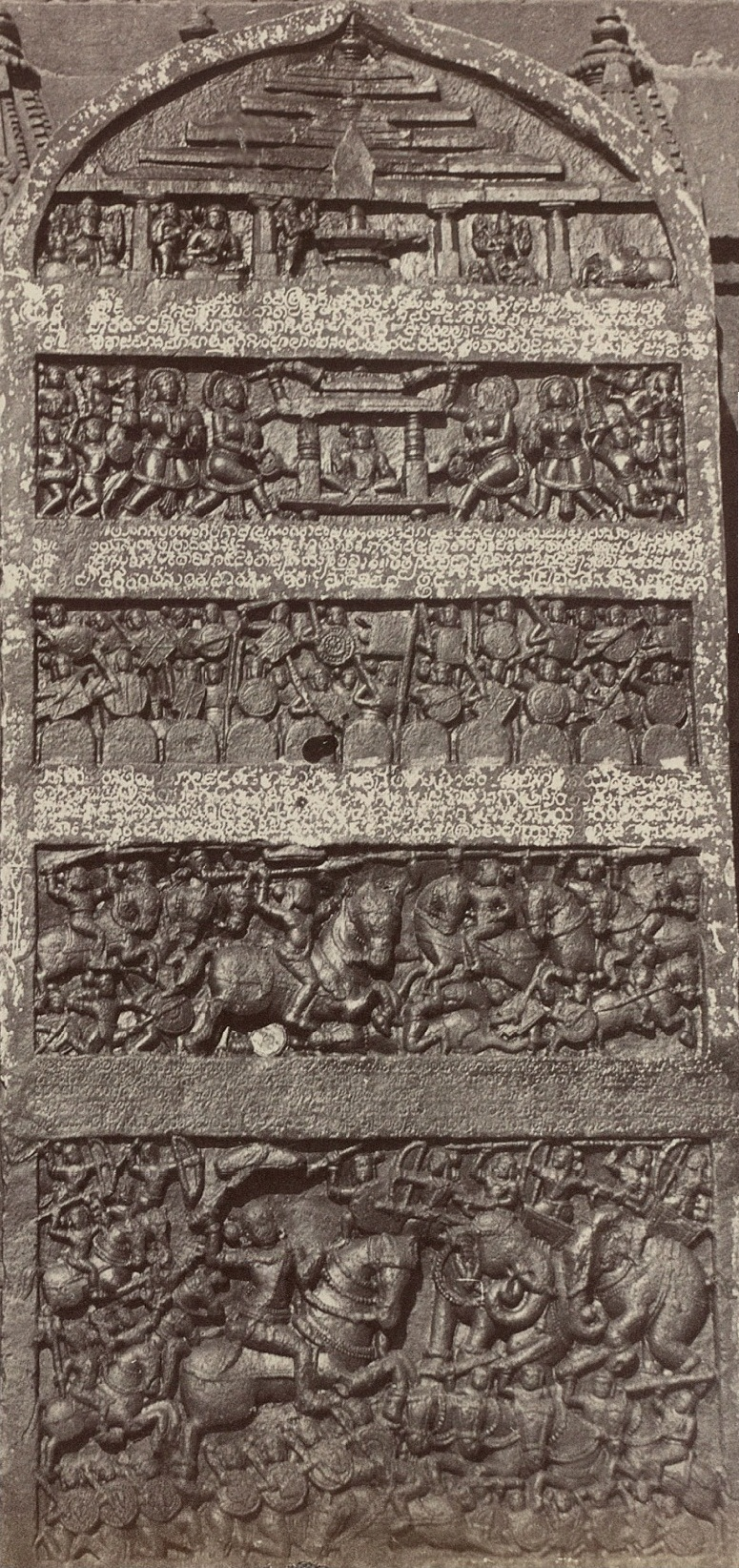
A five-paneled hero stone from the 12th century with Old Kannada inscription

A hero stone was usually divided into three panels, but occasionally, into four or five panels depending on the event. The upper panel depicts the subject worshipping a deity such as a Shiva lingam, Vishnu, Gajalakshmi, or a tirthankara, the middle panel depicts the hero sometimes seated in a palanquin or a shrine being lifted toward the heavens by apsaras (heavenly nymphs), and the lower panels would display battle scenes. One of the largest hero stone, about 12 feet high is found in Betageri, Karnataka. In Tamil Nadu, Department of Archeology found several hundred hero stones that had been erected in the memory of warriors who sacrificed their lives defending their community or region. Those that are carved with inscriptions narrate the act of the hero, the battle, and the name of king who fought the battle. The stones are found alone or in groups, often near an irrigation tank or lake outside a village.The Appanur Tamil-Brahmi hero stone is an inscribed quartz stone discovered at Appanur village in Ramanathapuram district, Tamil Nadu. The three-line Tamil-Brahmi inscription has been dated to around the 1st century BCE by epigraphist Y. Subbarayalu. It reads “appanur eri mandu vizhuntha atthiyan kiran kal”, commemorating Kiran, son of Aththiyan, who died at Appanur. A hero stone inscription dating to the Sangam period was discovered at Malayadipatti village near Karivalamvandanallur in Tenkasi district, Tamil Nadu, during excavations by the Tamil Nadu State Department of Archaeology. The four-line inscription is written in a script representing a transitional stage from Tamil-Brahmi to Vatteluttu. It contains the names Karukkan, Sulagan, Nannang and Kodiyan, and has been interpreted as commemorating Nannang Kodiyan, son of Karukkan Sulagan, dating to around the 5th century.Two hero stones dating to around the 5th century were discovered at Desoor village near Vandavasi in Tiruvannamalai district, Tamil Nadu, in 2019. The stones bear inscriptions in Tamil and were identified as memorials to Kotrambha Kizhar and his son Seelan. Three other hero stones discovered at the site were dated to the 10th century. One hero stone dating to the 9th century Pallava King Dantivarman, depicts the hero riding a galloping horse beautifully dressed and carrying a spear. Another was recovered at Pappapatti in Usilampatti taluk and probably dates from the 18th century. This stone shows a warrior posed heroically, accompanied by his wife who holds a flower. Creating hero stones had been prevalent since the Sangam period dating back 2600 years, and continuing until the Nayaka and post-Nayaka period to about 19th century. In March 2014, a hero stone dating to the 8th century Pandya country, with a Tamil inscription in the Vatteluttu script was found in Vellalankottai in the Thoothukudi district. and another that was installed by a woman in memory of her husband who killed a leopard preying on cattle that strayed into the hamlet. In 2017, two rare hero stones raised in honour of warrior-women riding to a battle were found, dating back 13th century.

Hero stones were not always made in honour of a person. The Atakur inscription (also spelt Athakur) is one such hero stone. It is dated to 939 CE and includes classical Kannada poetic inscription commemorating the death of the favourite hound of Ganga King Butuga II (the hound died fighting a wild boar).

In Himachal Pradesh, the hero-stones were installed at ponds, fountains, temples, and under fig (pipal) trees. They were commissioned by ruling dynasties, Rajput nobles, and Brahmins, with one of the earliest known examples dating to the 13th century kept at Bhuri Singh Museum, Chamba. Hero-stones usually were made to commemorate rulers who died without issue. Hero-stones continued to be produced in the region until being surmounted by photography in the early 20th century.

== Gallery ==
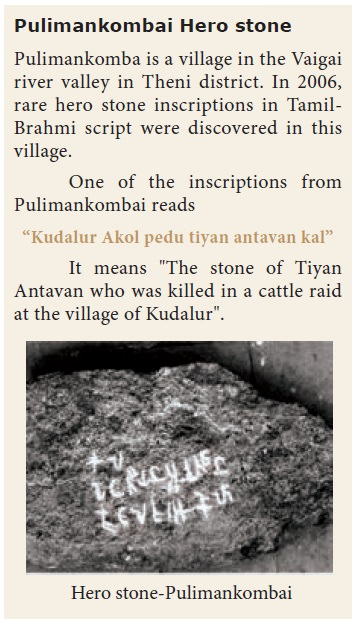
Hero stone, probably belonging to BCE. Tamil-Brahmi inscription during Tamil Sangam age in Theni district, Tamil Nadu

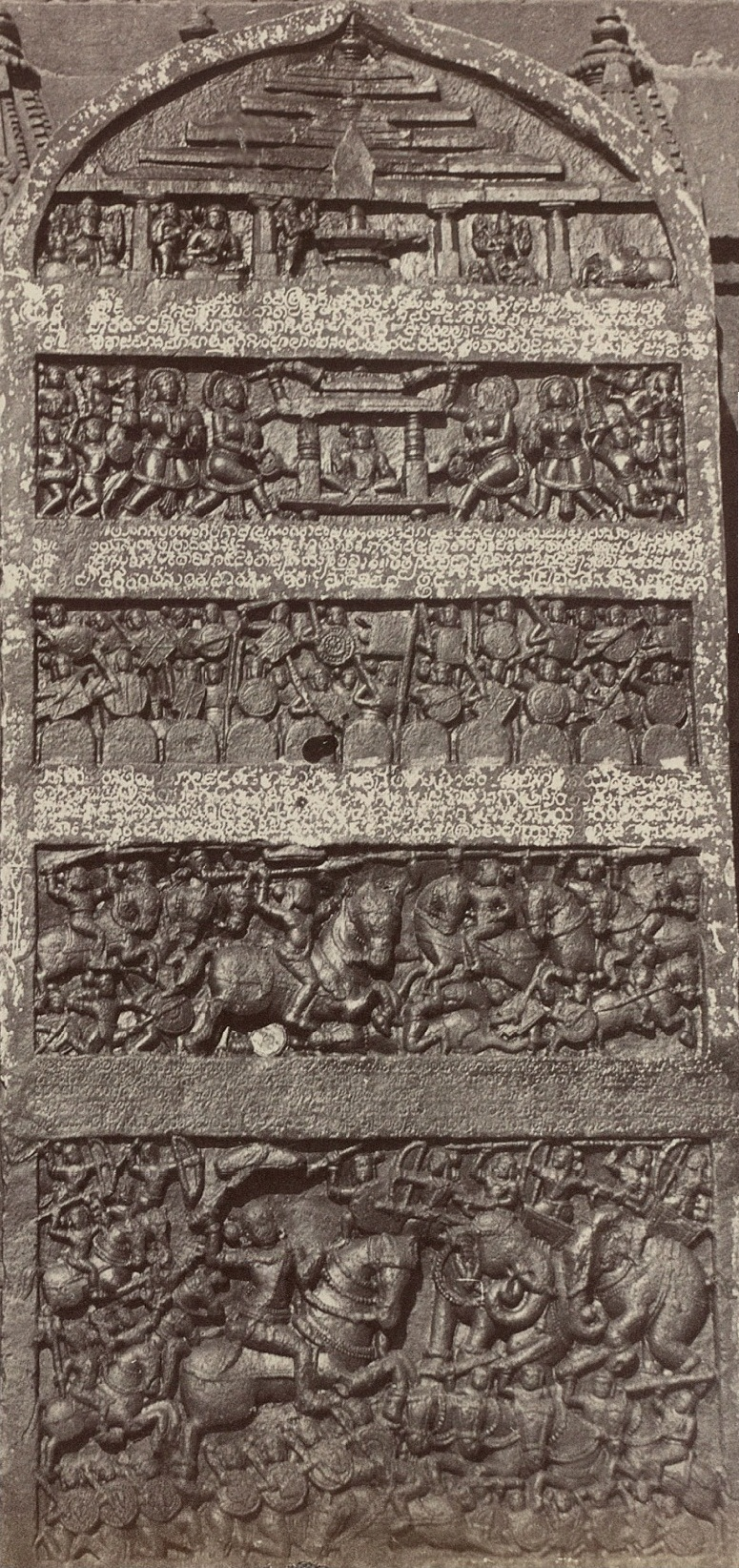
Hero stone from 12th century with Old Kannada inscription from the Tarakeshvara Temple at Hangal, Karnataka

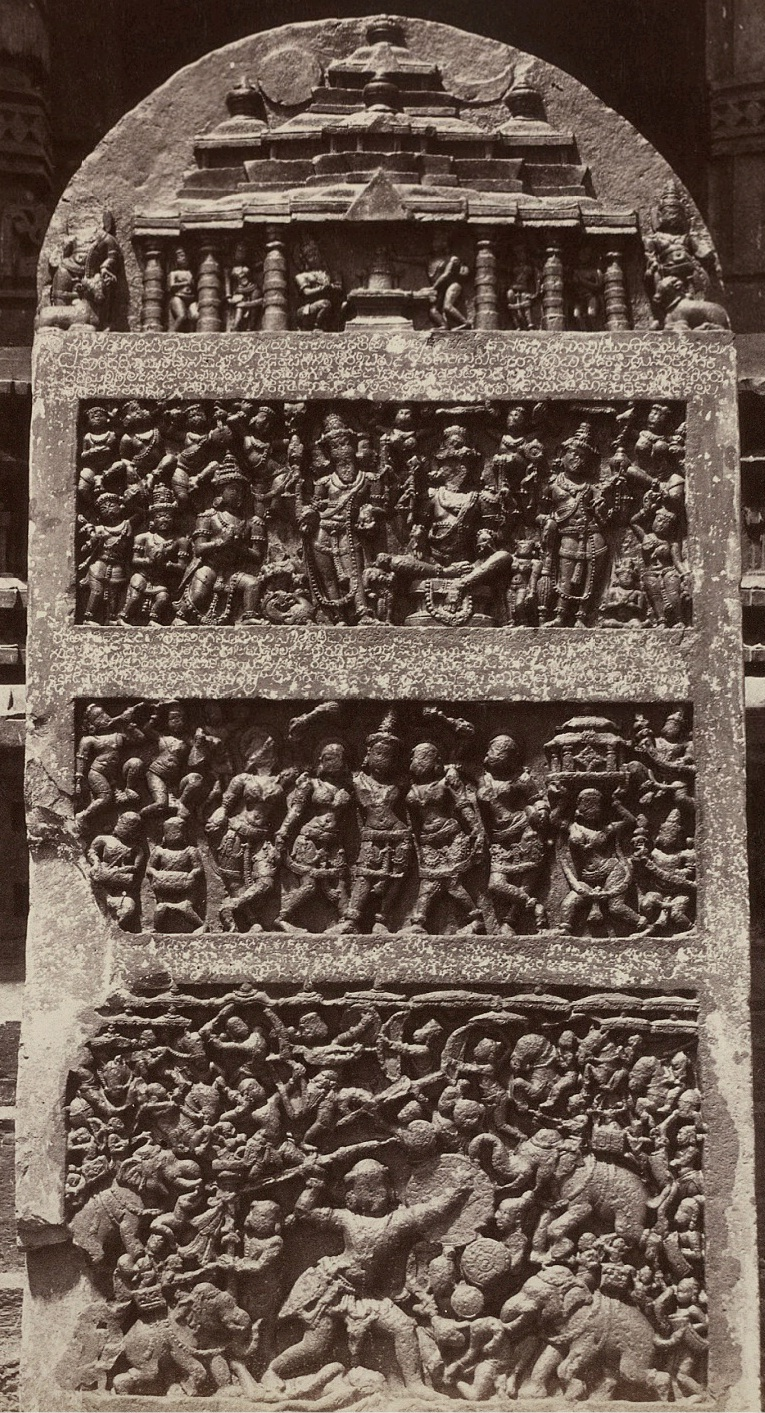
Hero stone from 12th century with Old Kannada inscription from the Tarakeshvara Temple at Hangal, Karnataka

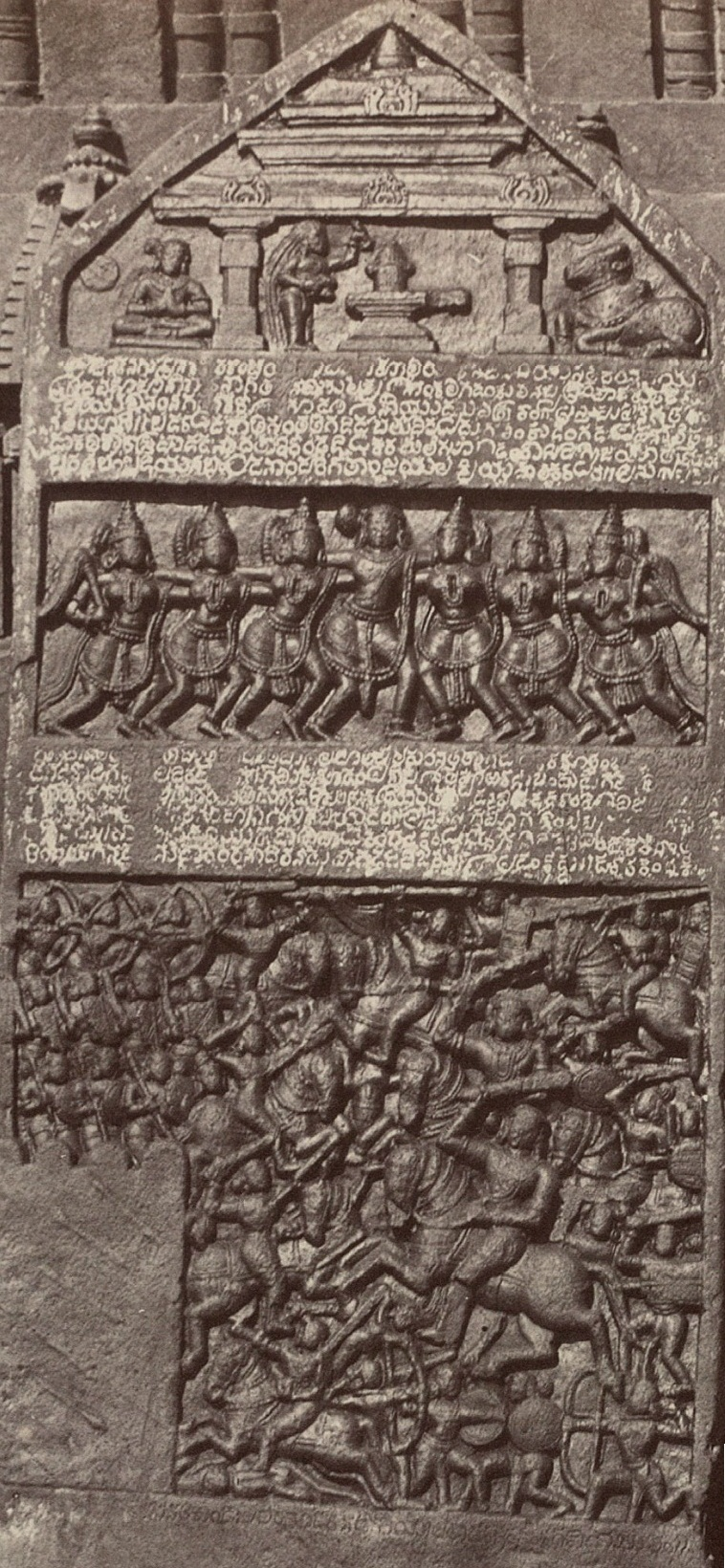
Hero stone from 12th century with Old Kannada inscription from the Tarakeshvara Temple at Hangal, Karnataka

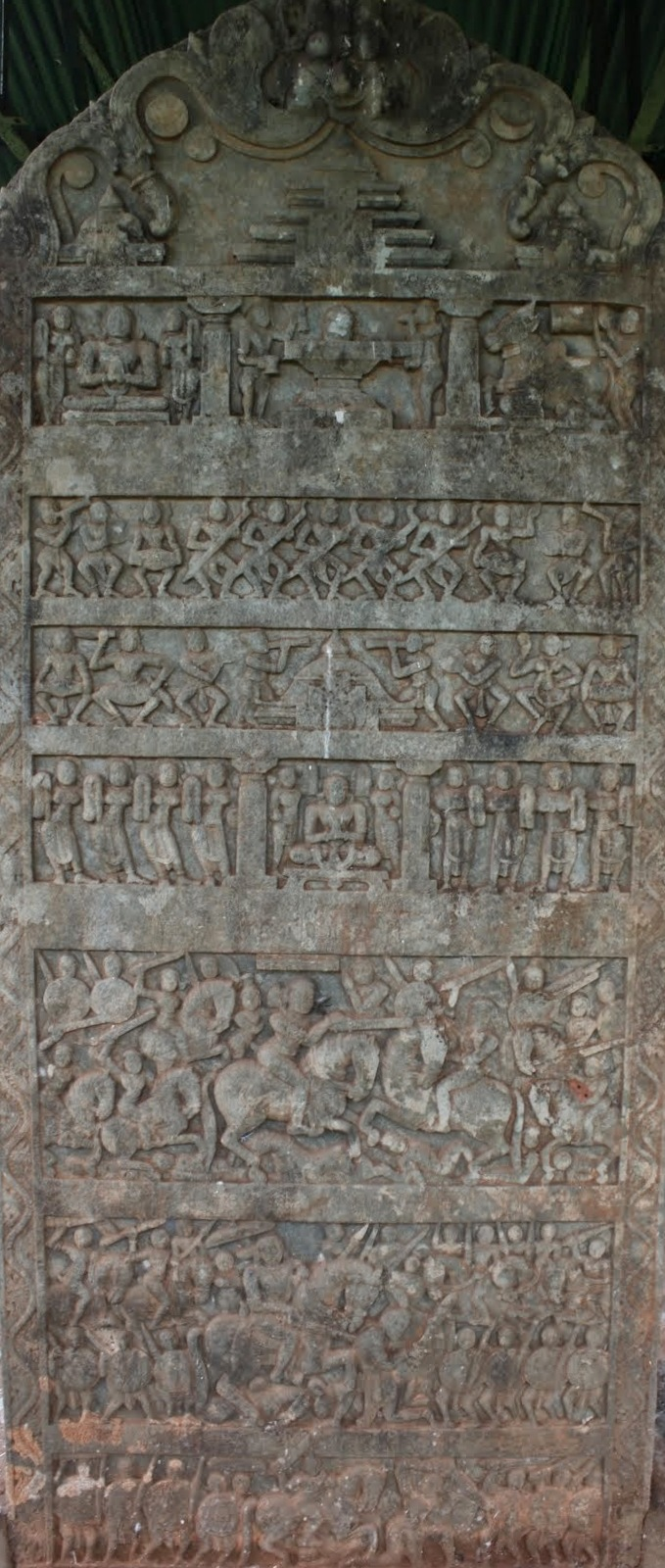
Seven panel Hero Stone from 12th century with Old Kannada inscription from Siddapur taluk, Karnataka

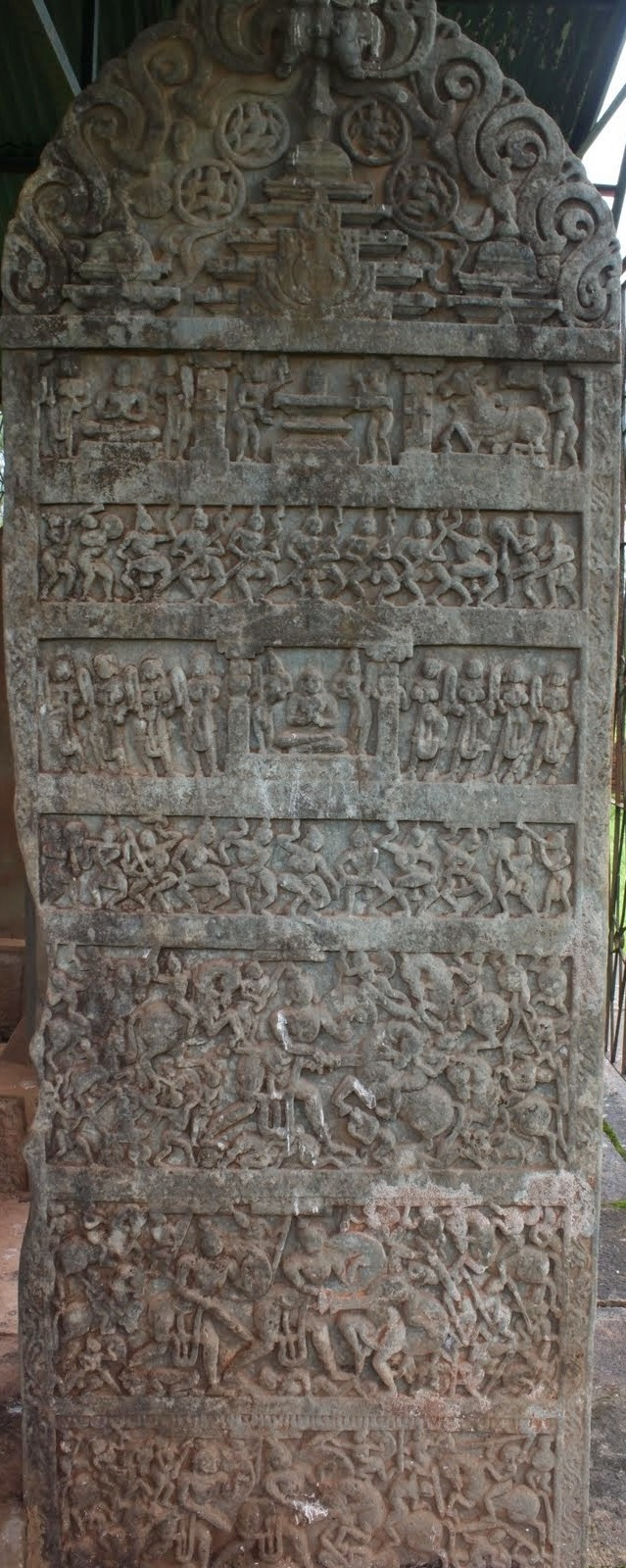
Seven panel Hero Stone from 12th century with Old Kannada inscription from Siddapur taluk, Karnataka

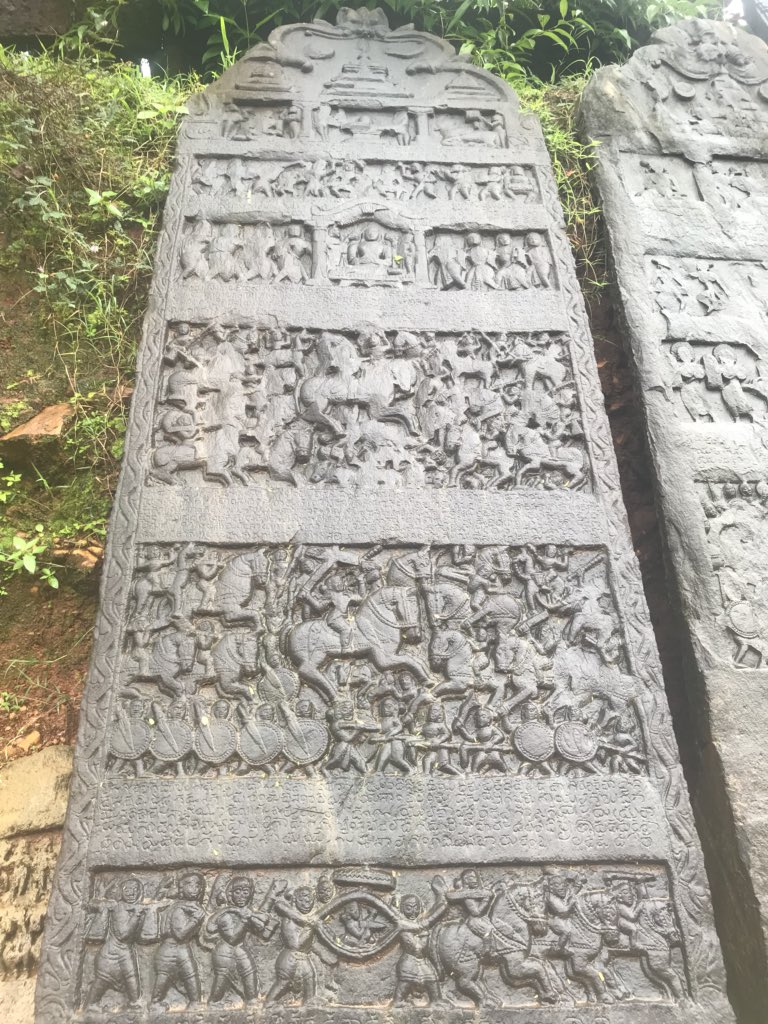
Seven panel Hero Stone from 1152 CE Old with Old Kannada inscription from Shimoga taluk, Karnataka

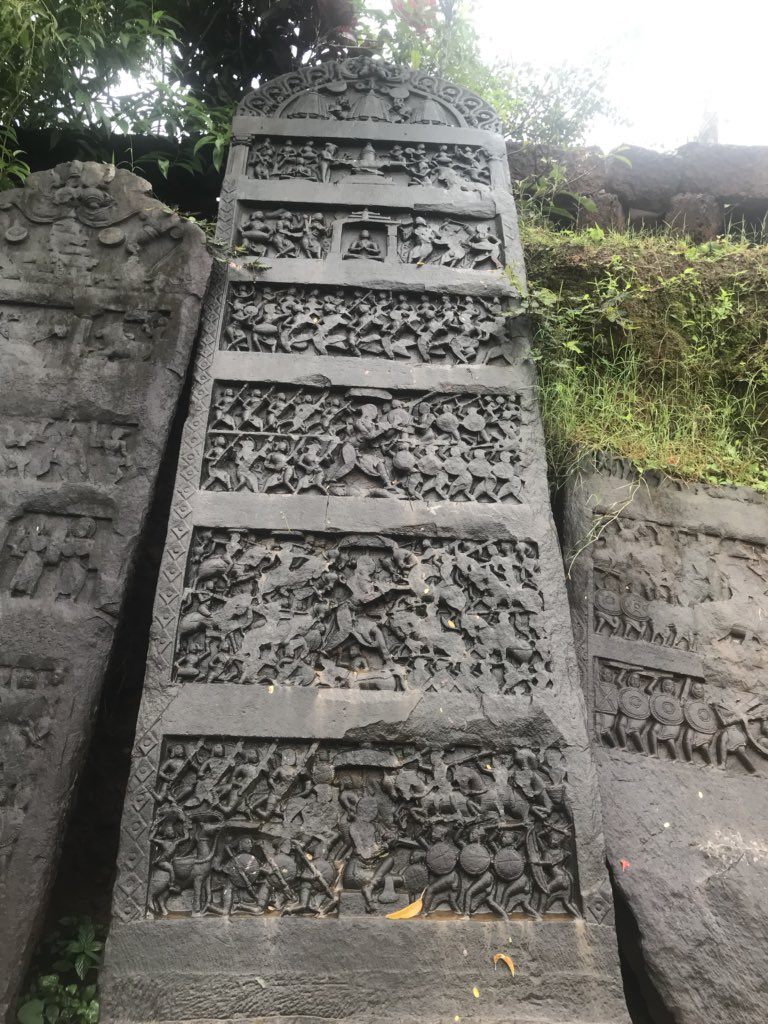
Seven panel Hero Stone from 1152 CE Old with Old Kannada inscription from Shimoga taluk, Karnataka

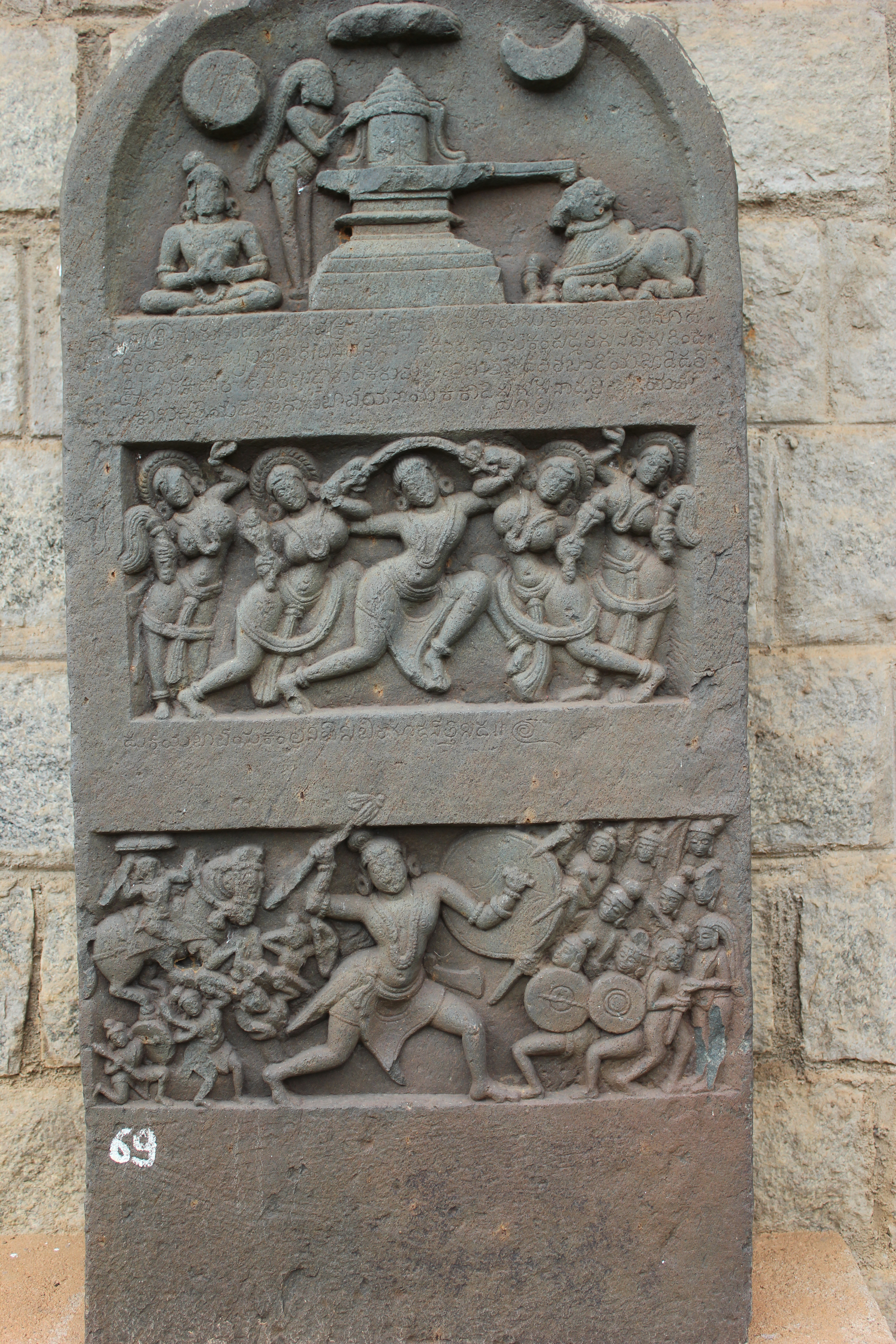
Hero stone with 1160 CE Old Kannada inscription from the rule of Kalachuri King Bijjala in Kedareshvara temple at Balligavi in Shimoga district, Karnataka

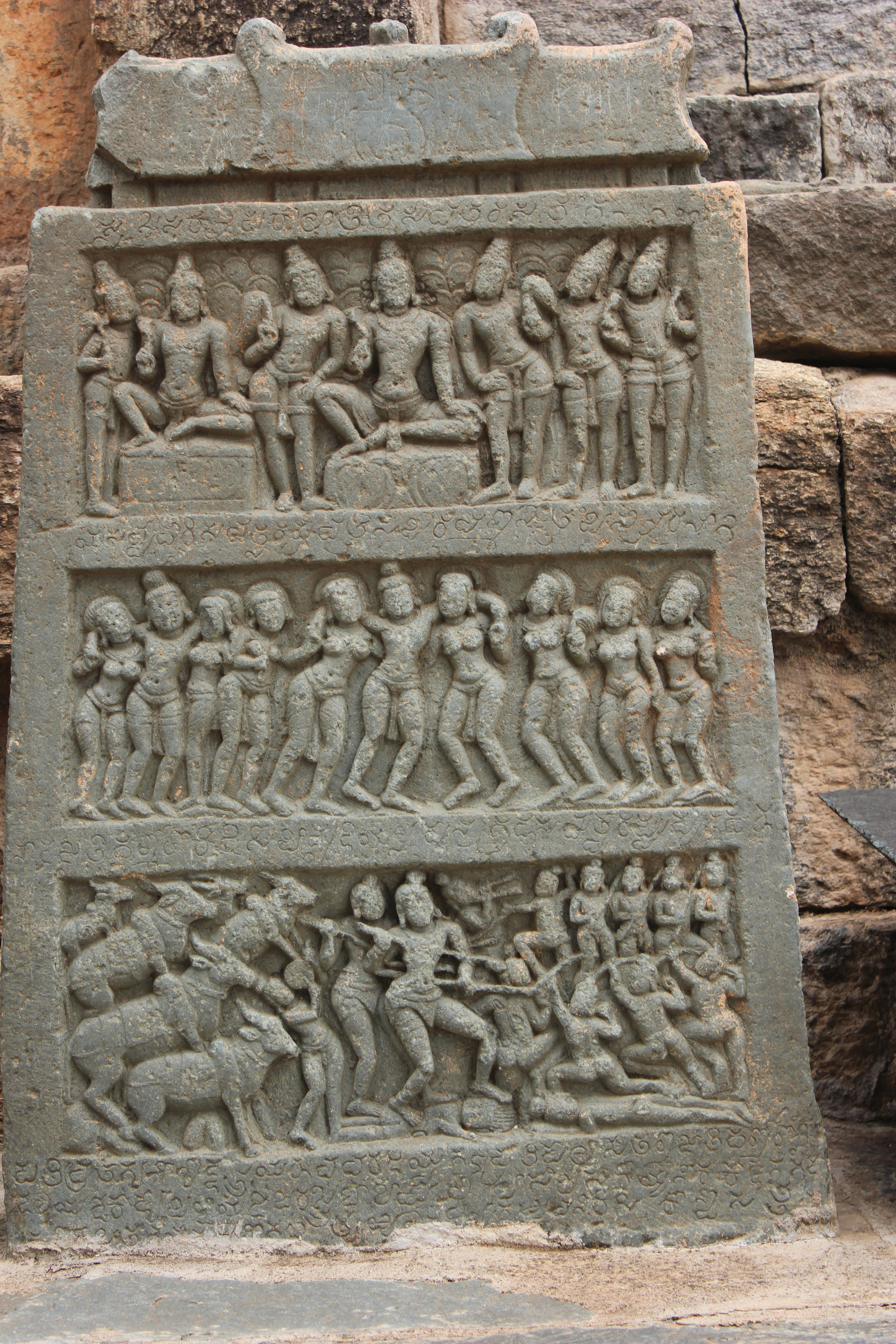
Hero stone with 11th- or 12th-century Old Kannada inscription in Kalleshvara temple in Bagali in Davangere district, Karnataka

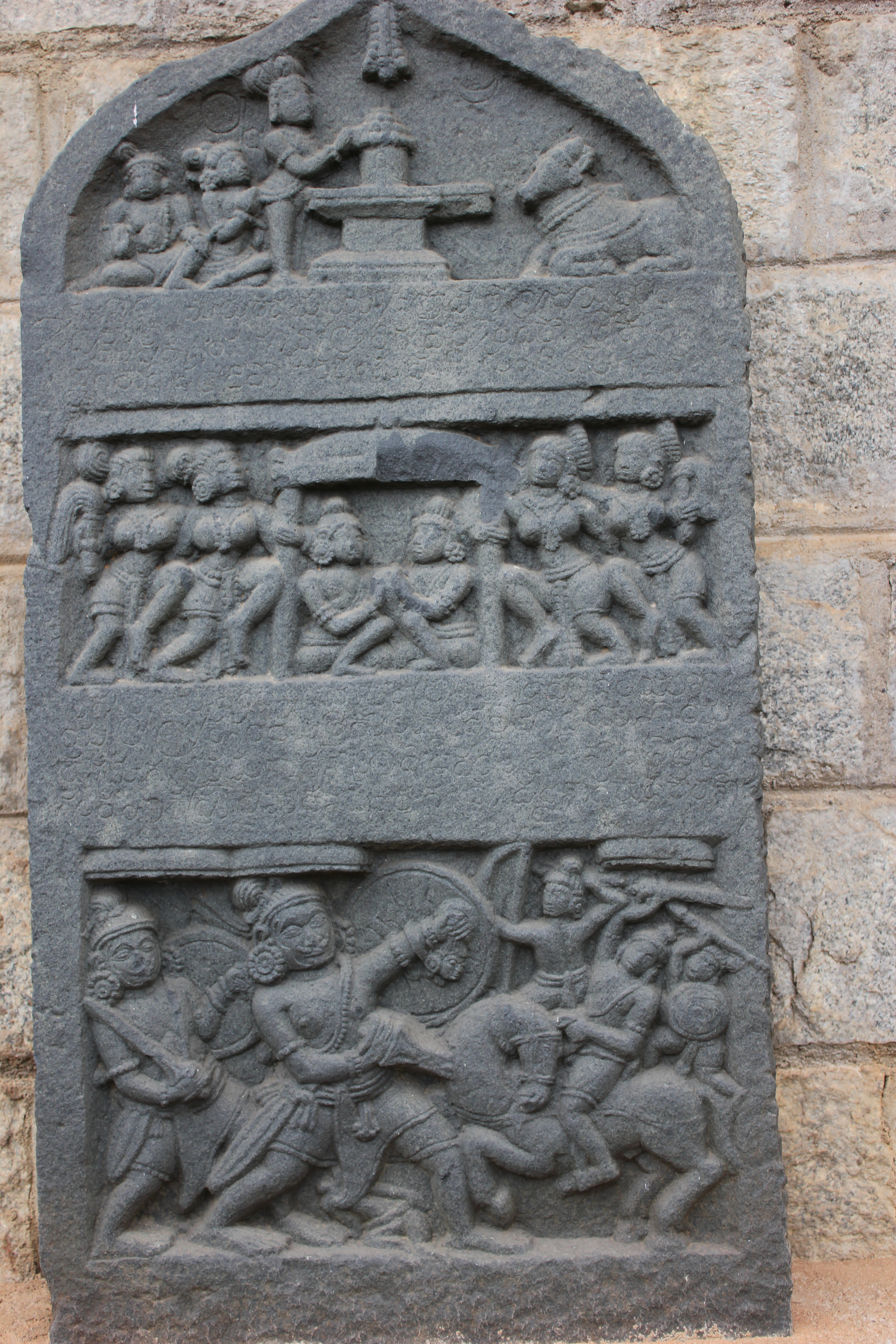
Hero stone with 1180 CE Old Kannada inscription from the rule of Kalachuri King Ahavamalla in Kedareshvara temple at Balligavi in Shimoga district, Karnataka

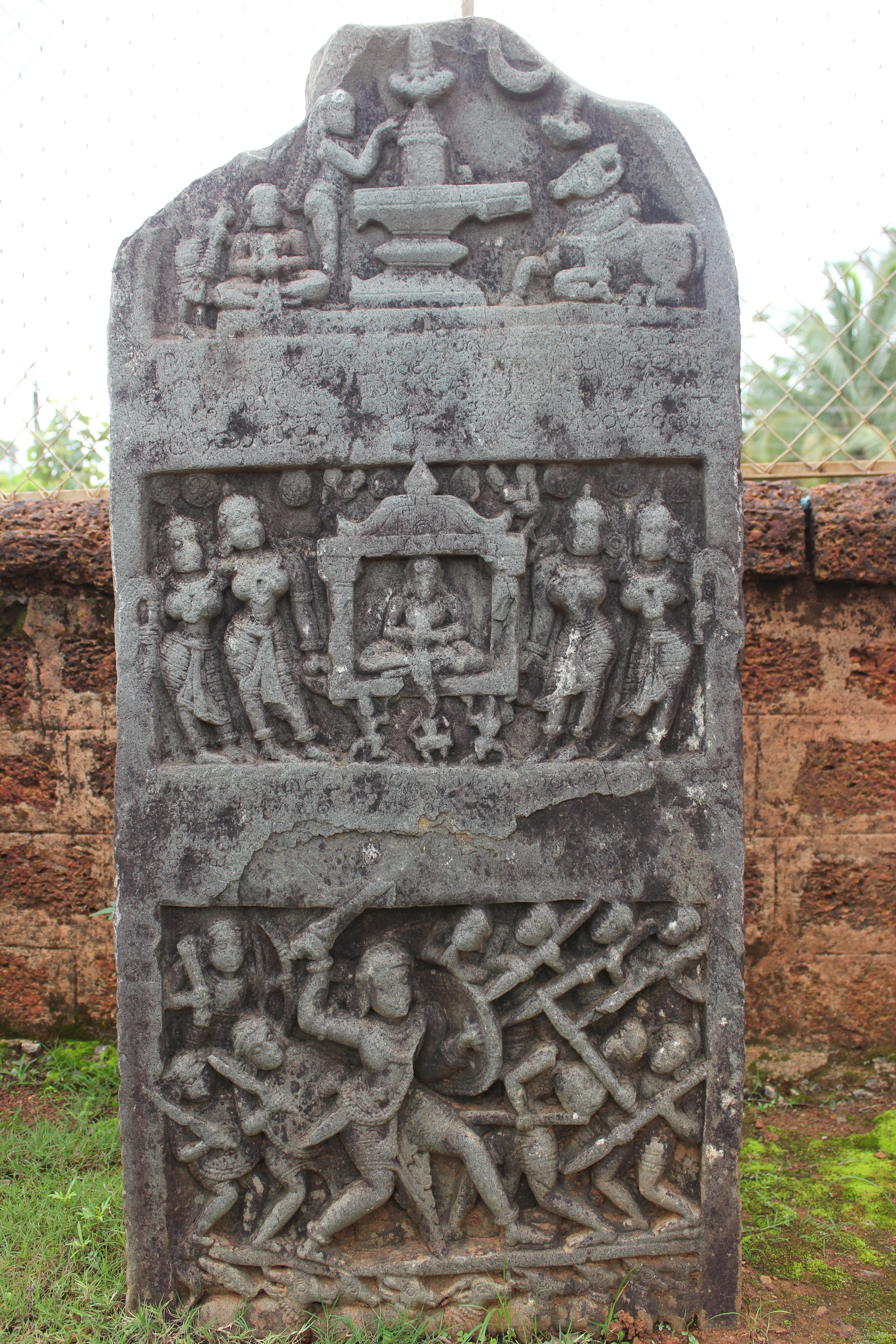
Hero stone with old Kannada inscription dated 1235 CE from the rule of Yadava King Singhana II in Kaitabeshvara temple at Kubatur in Shimoga district, Karnataka

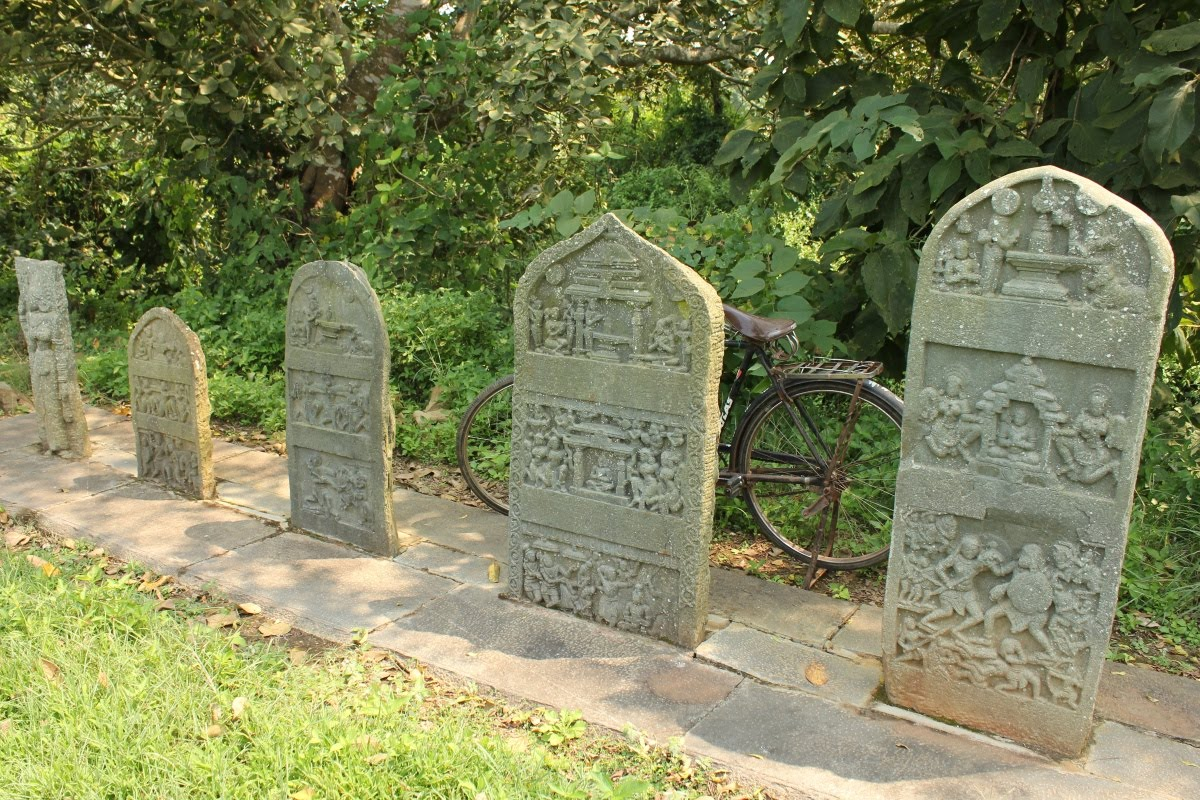
Hero stone from 10th century with Old Kannada inscription at Trimurthi Narayana Gudi, Karnataka

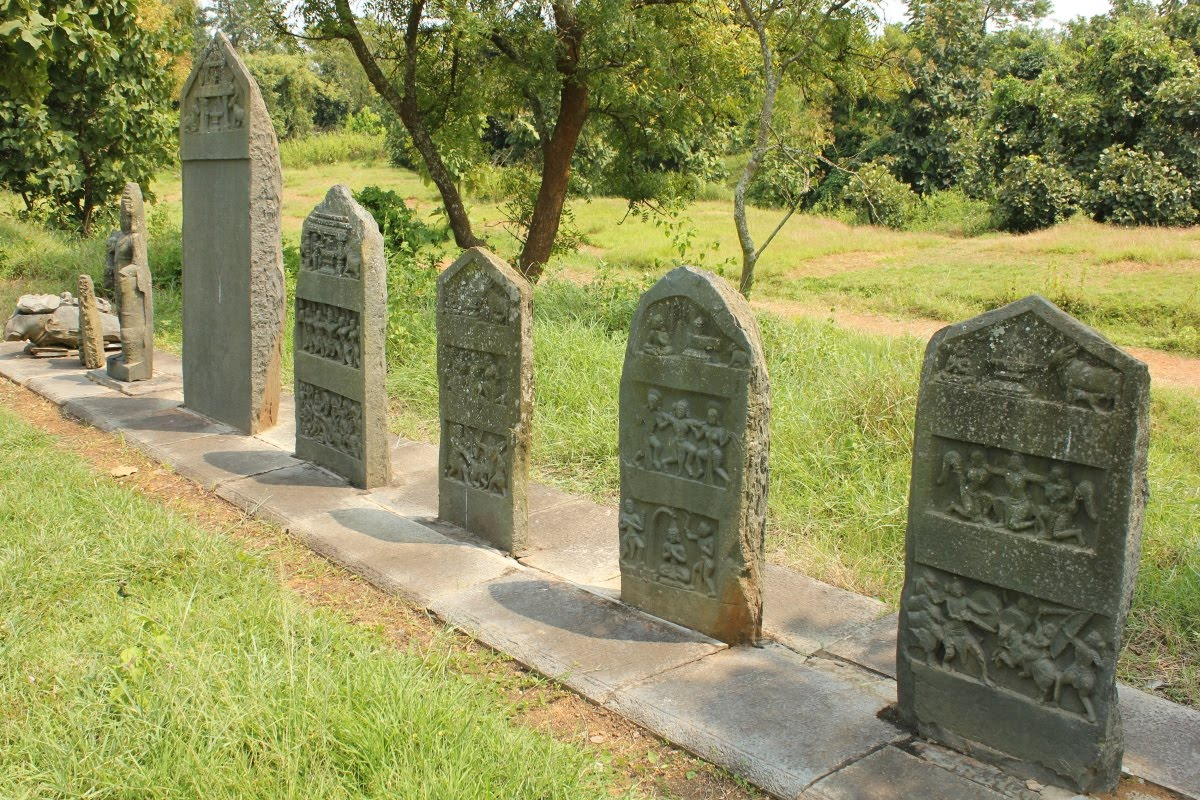
Hero stone from 10th century with Old Kannada inscription at Trimurthi Narayana Gudi, Karnataka

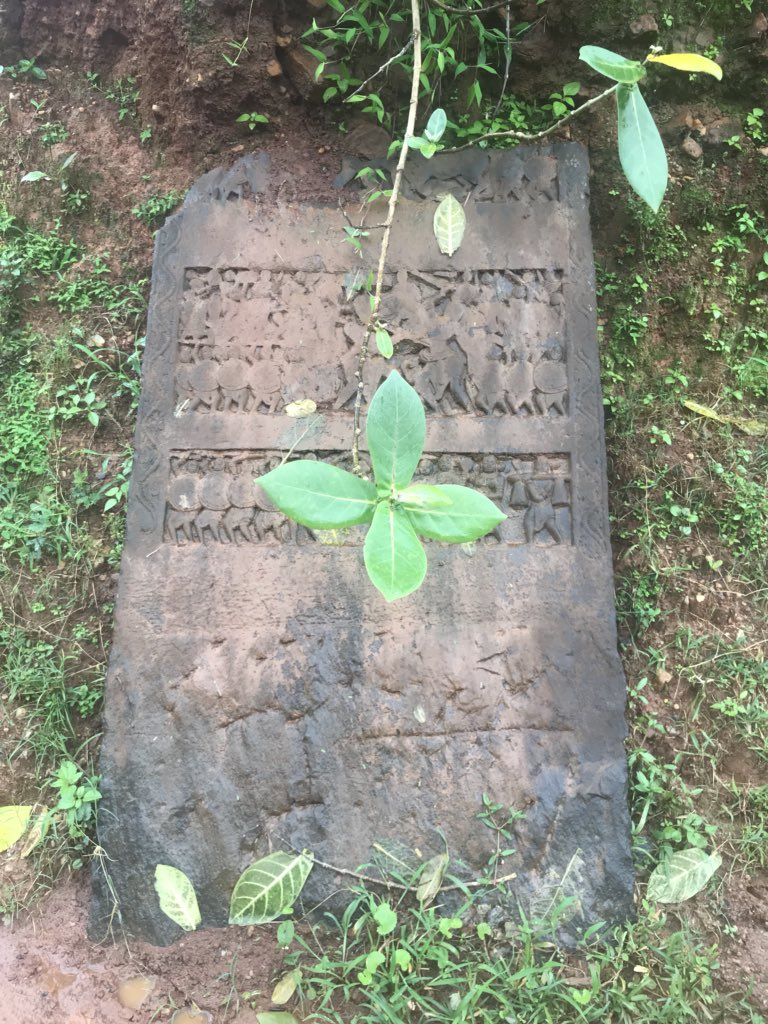
Hero stone with 1152 CE Old Kannada inscription, Shimoga district, Karnataka

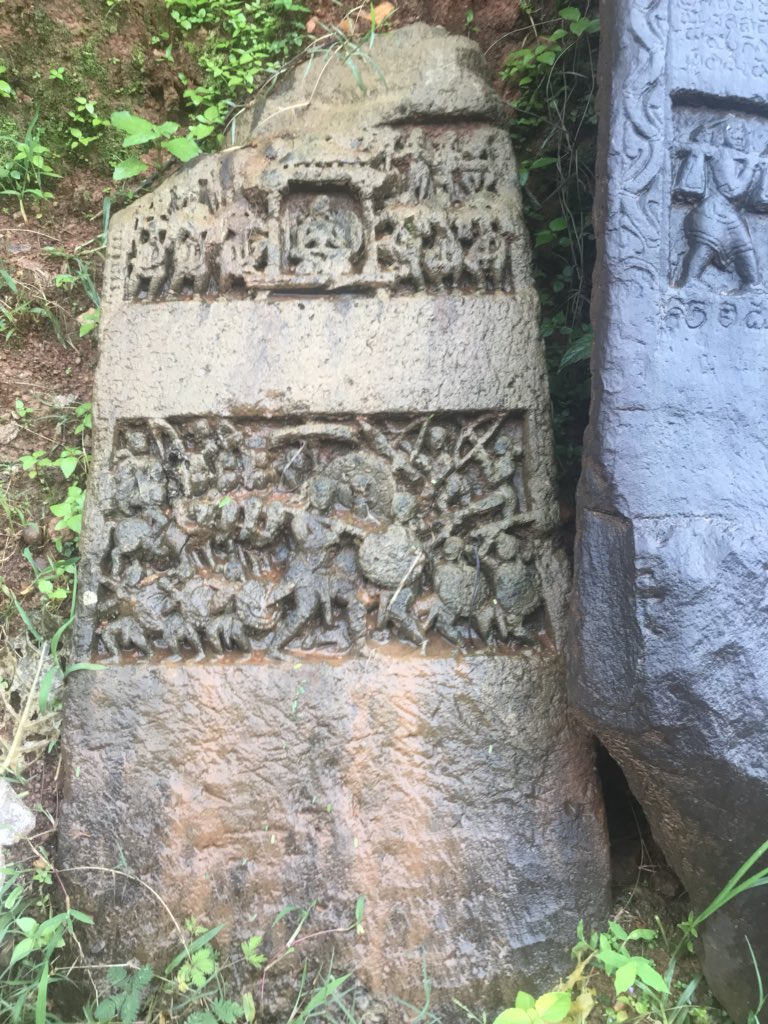
Hero stone with 1152 CE Old Kannada inscription, Shimoga district, Karnataka

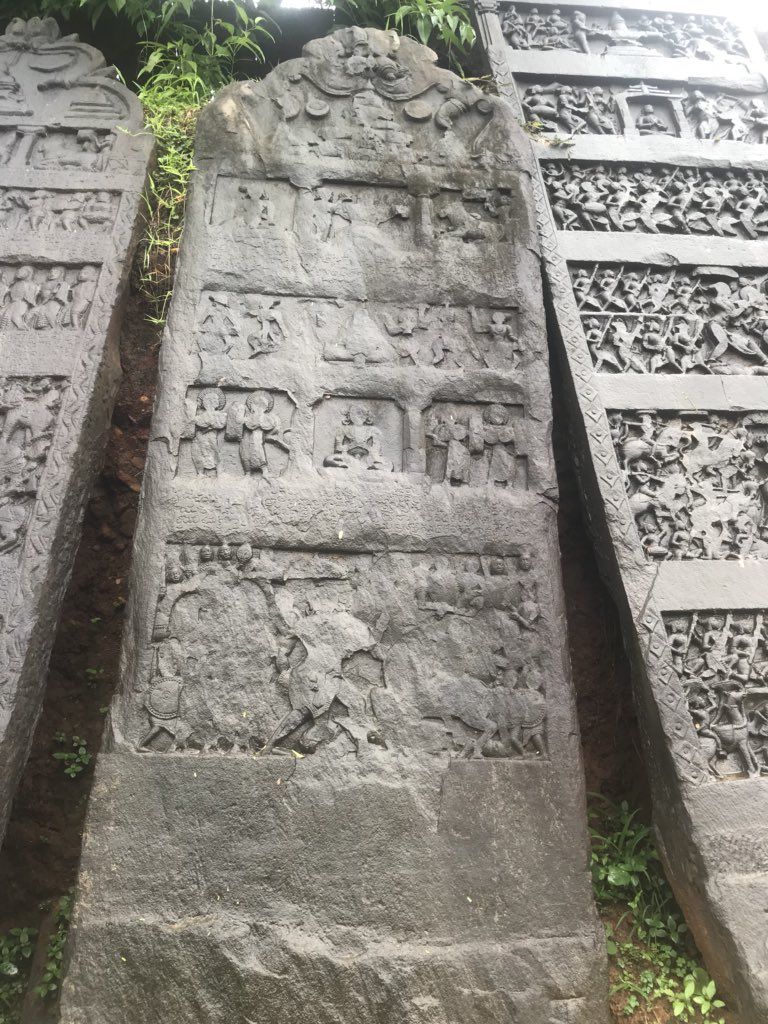
Hero stone with 1152 CE Old Kannada inscription, Shimoga district, Karnataka

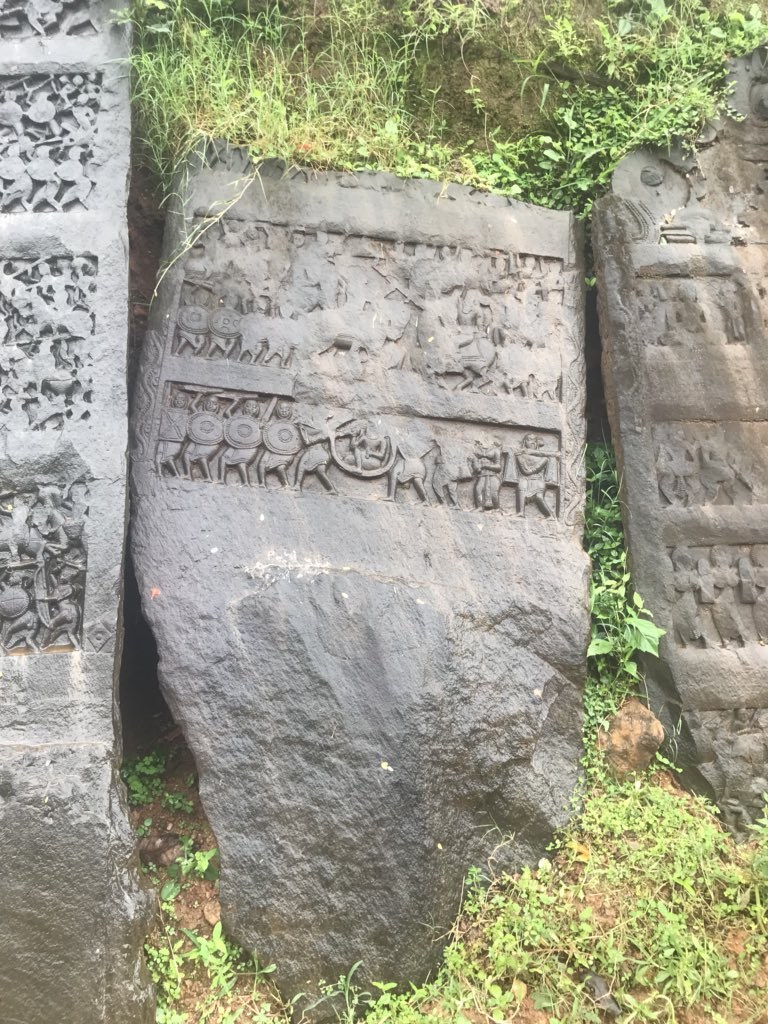
Hero stone with 1152 CE Old Kannada inscription, Shimoga district, Karnataka

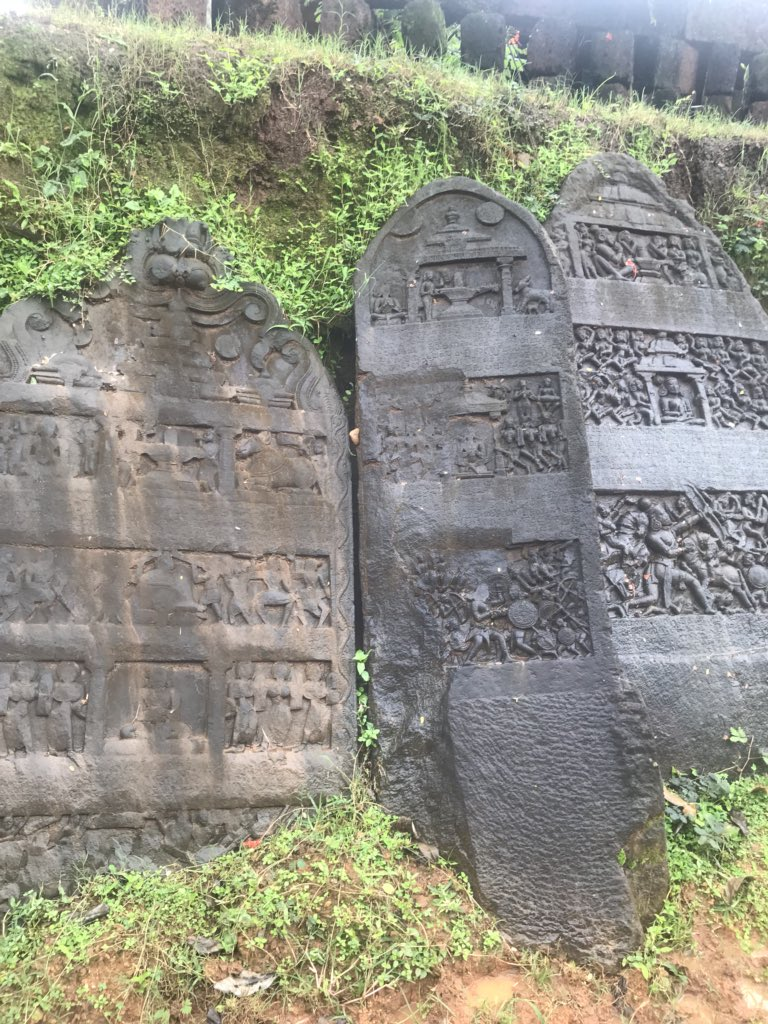
Hero stone with 1152 CE Old Kannada inscription, Shimoga district, Karnataka

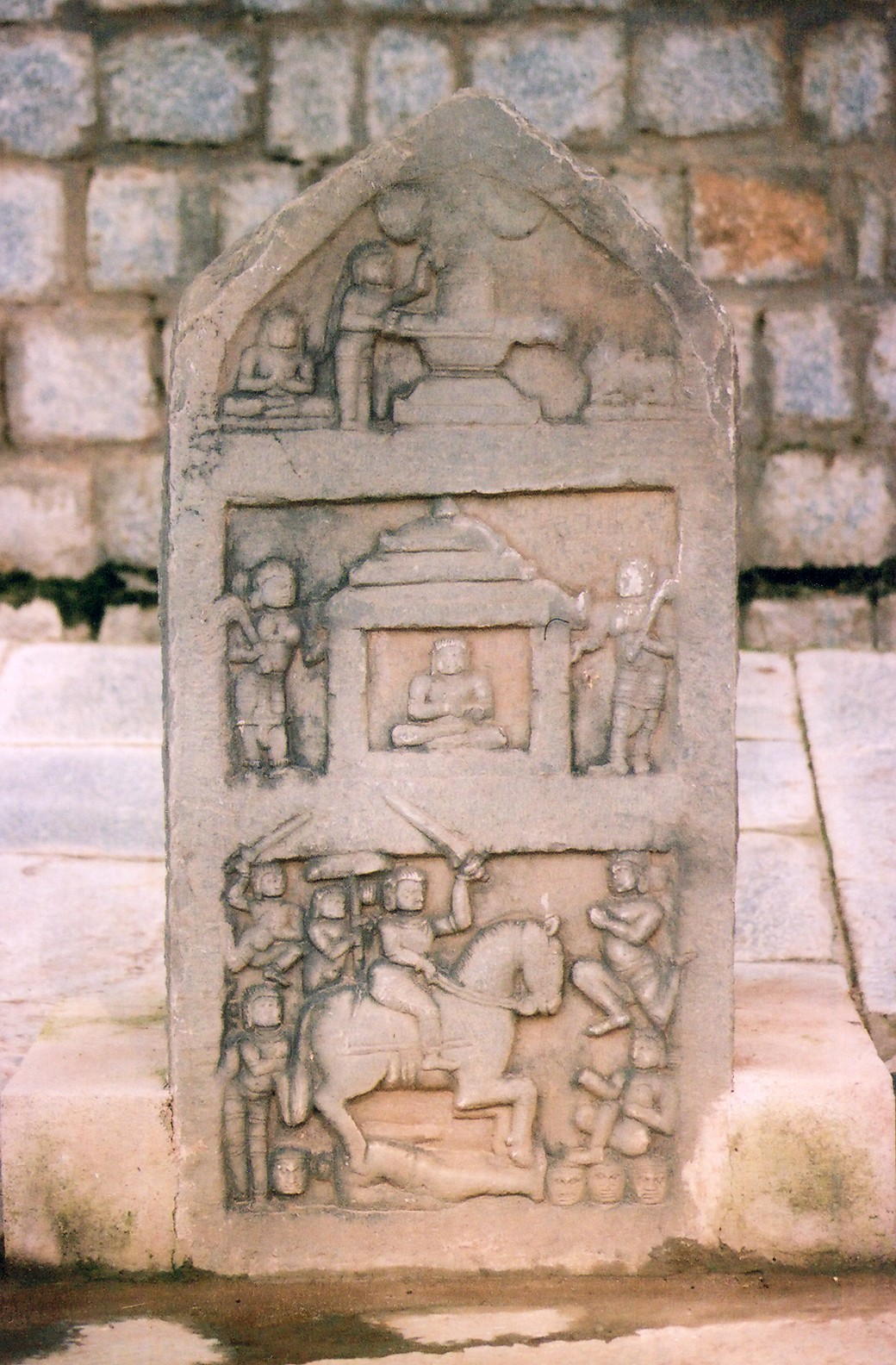
Hero stone from Later Chalukya period at Siddhesvara temple at Haveri in Haveri district, Karnataka

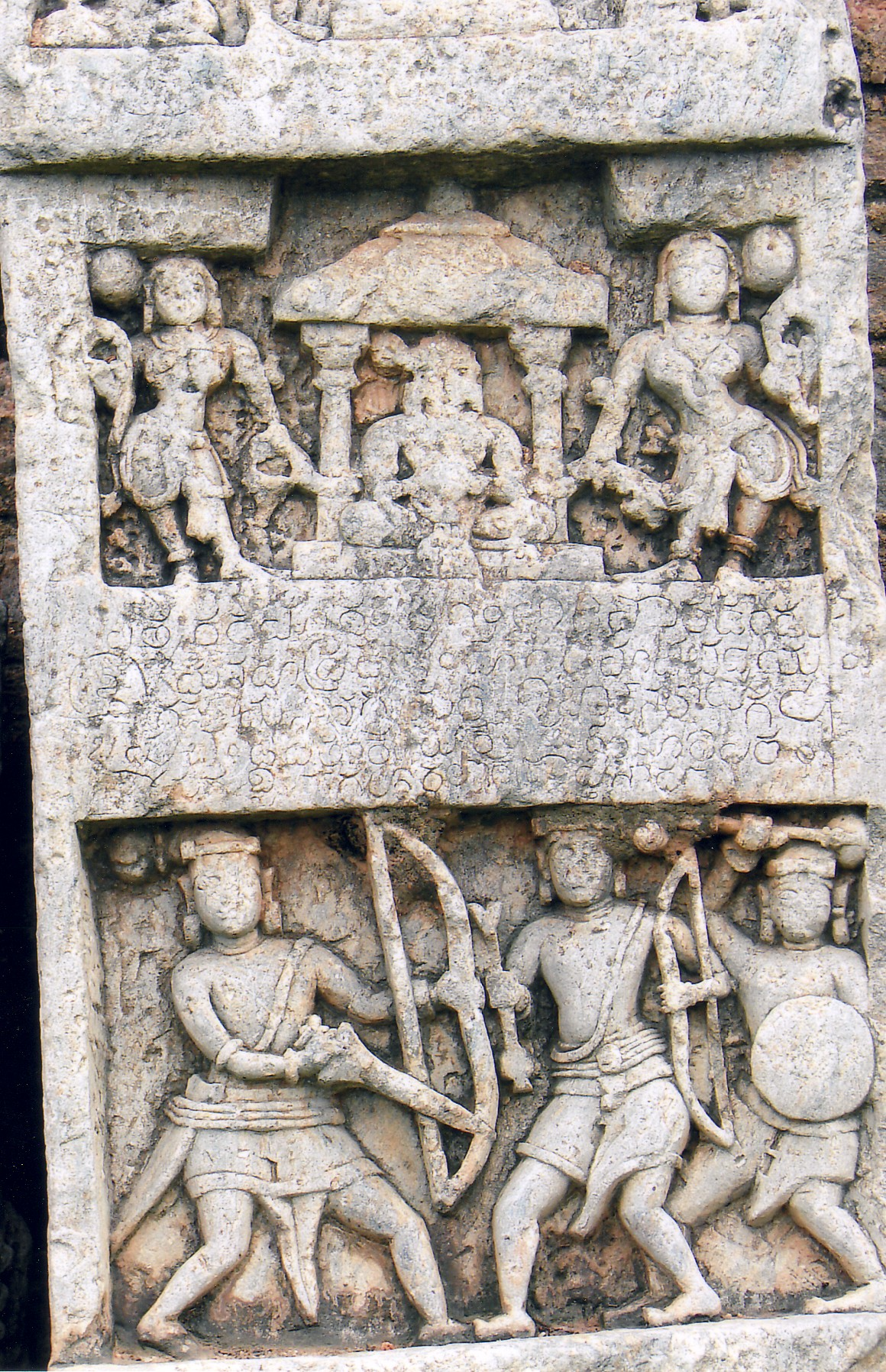
Hero stone with old Kannada inscription, 1220 CE, Arasikere, Karnataka

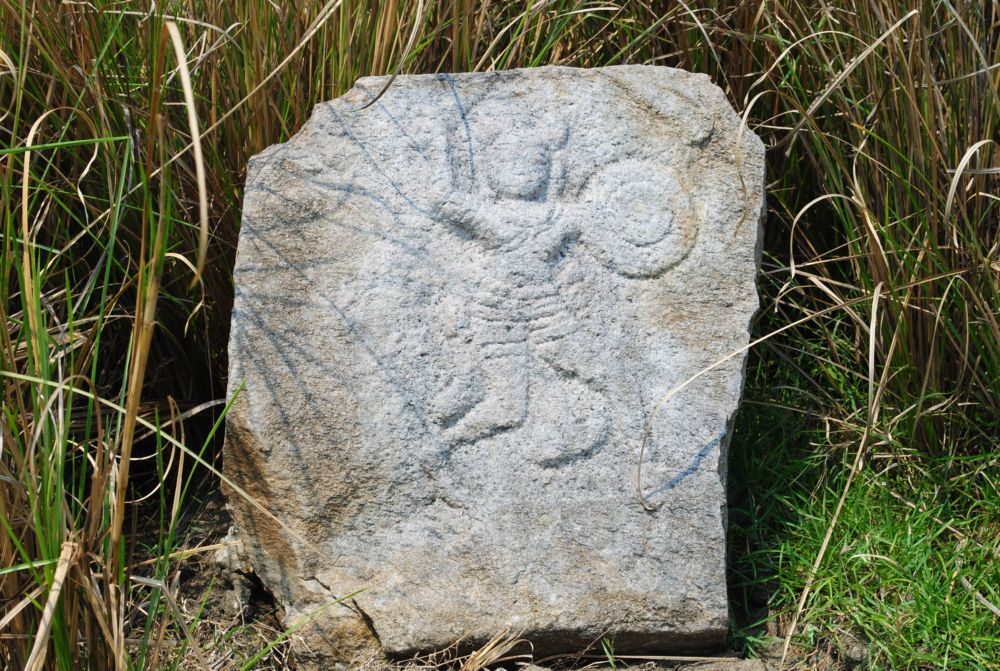
Murugamangalam hero stone, Tamil Nadu

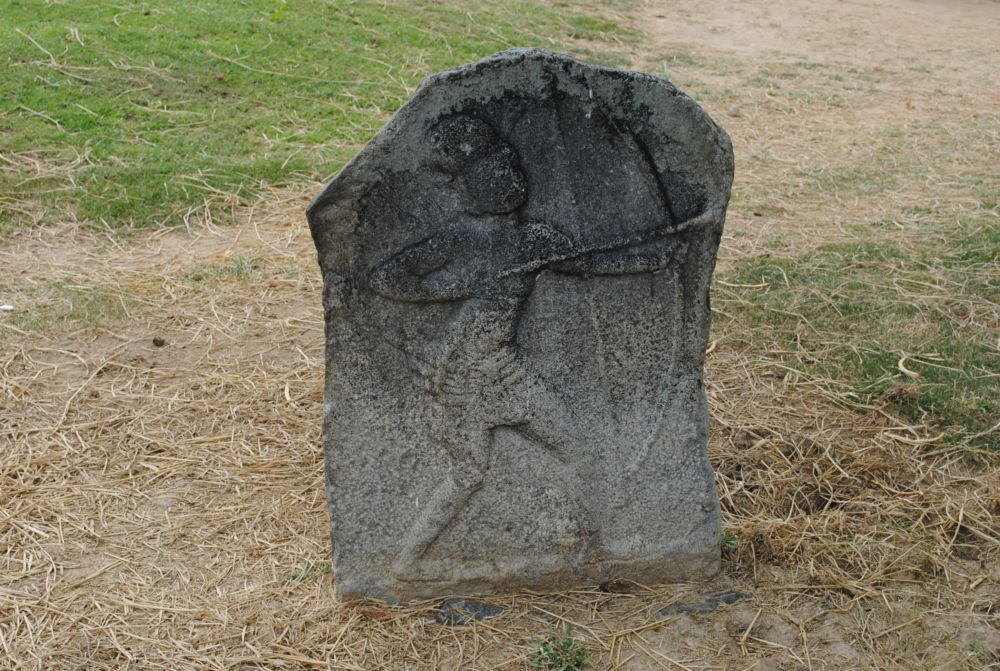
Narasinga Puram hero stone, 12th century CE, Tamil Nadu

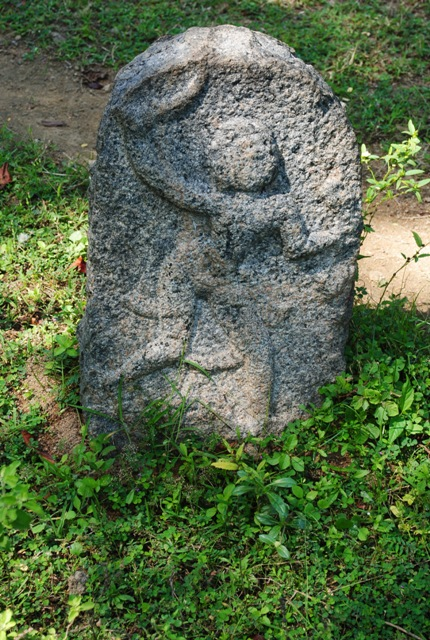
Tatchampadi hero stone, Tamil Nadu

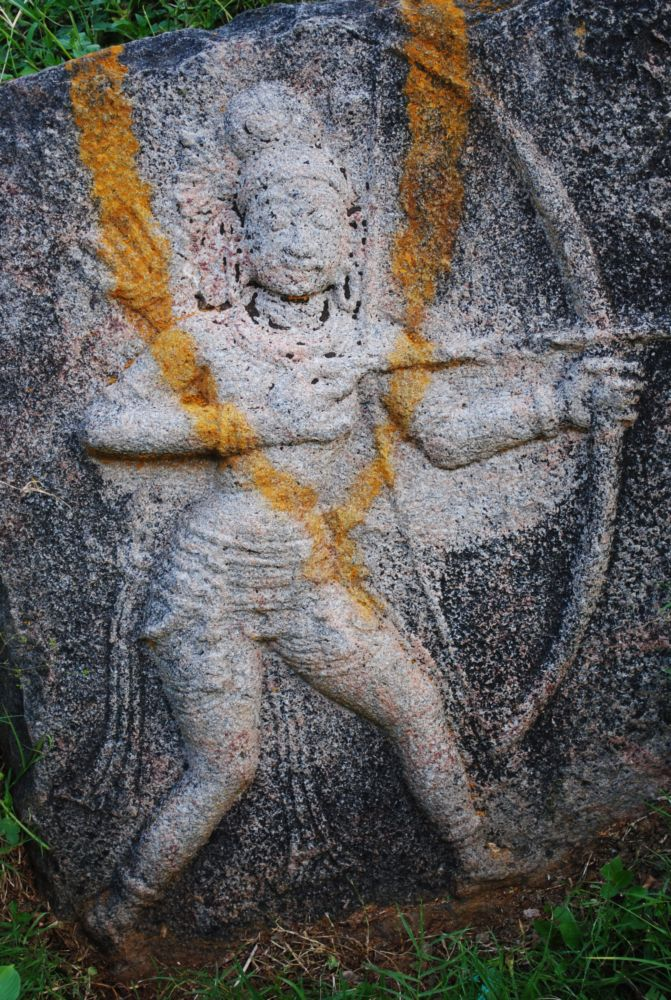
Olakkaravaadi hero stone 12th century CE, Tamil Nadu

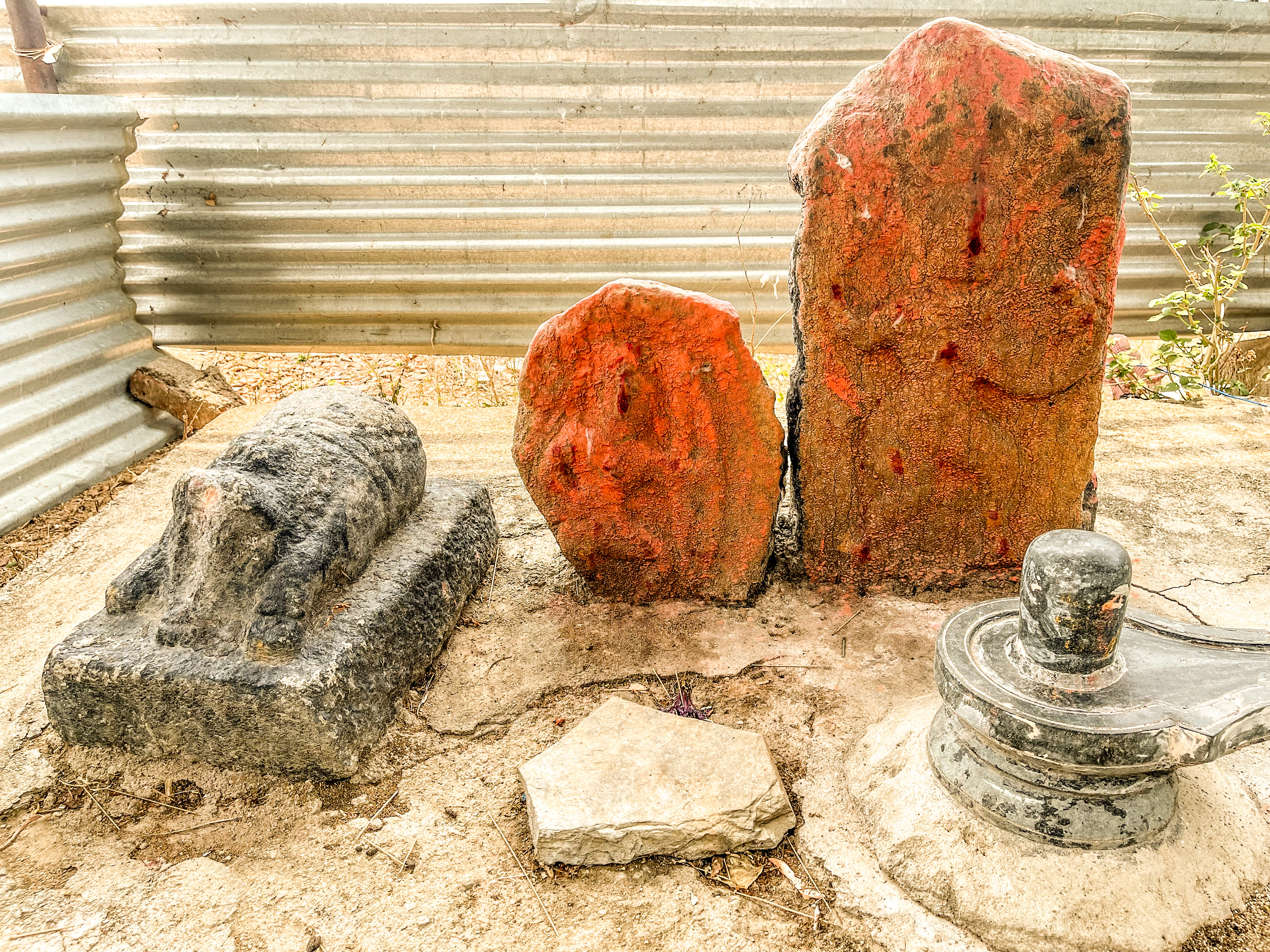
Two Hero stones from Kothapally Nizamabad district Telangana

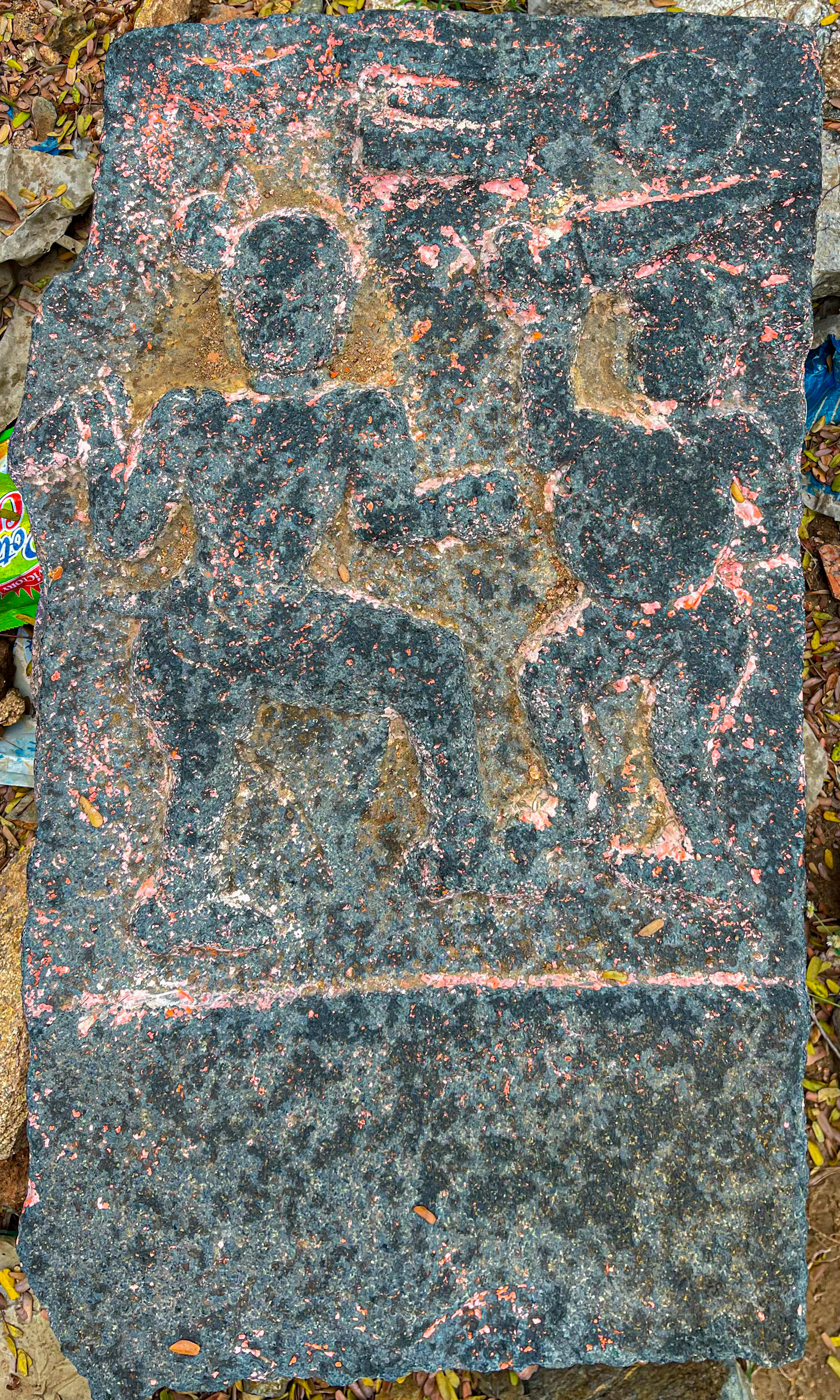
Hero stone found on the bank of river Godavari Tadpakal Nizamabad district Telangana

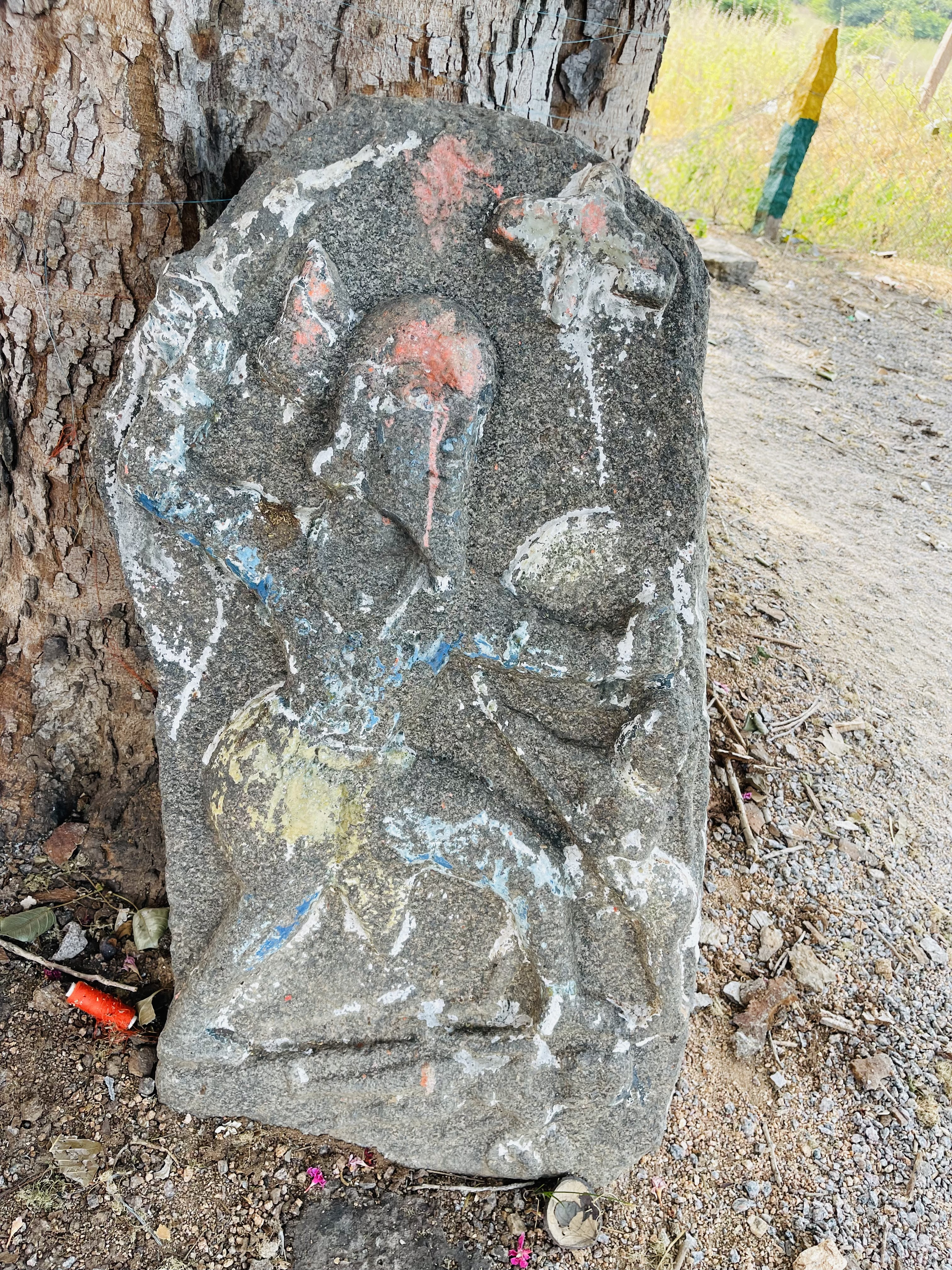
Hero stone found in Mallapur village Jagitial district Telangana

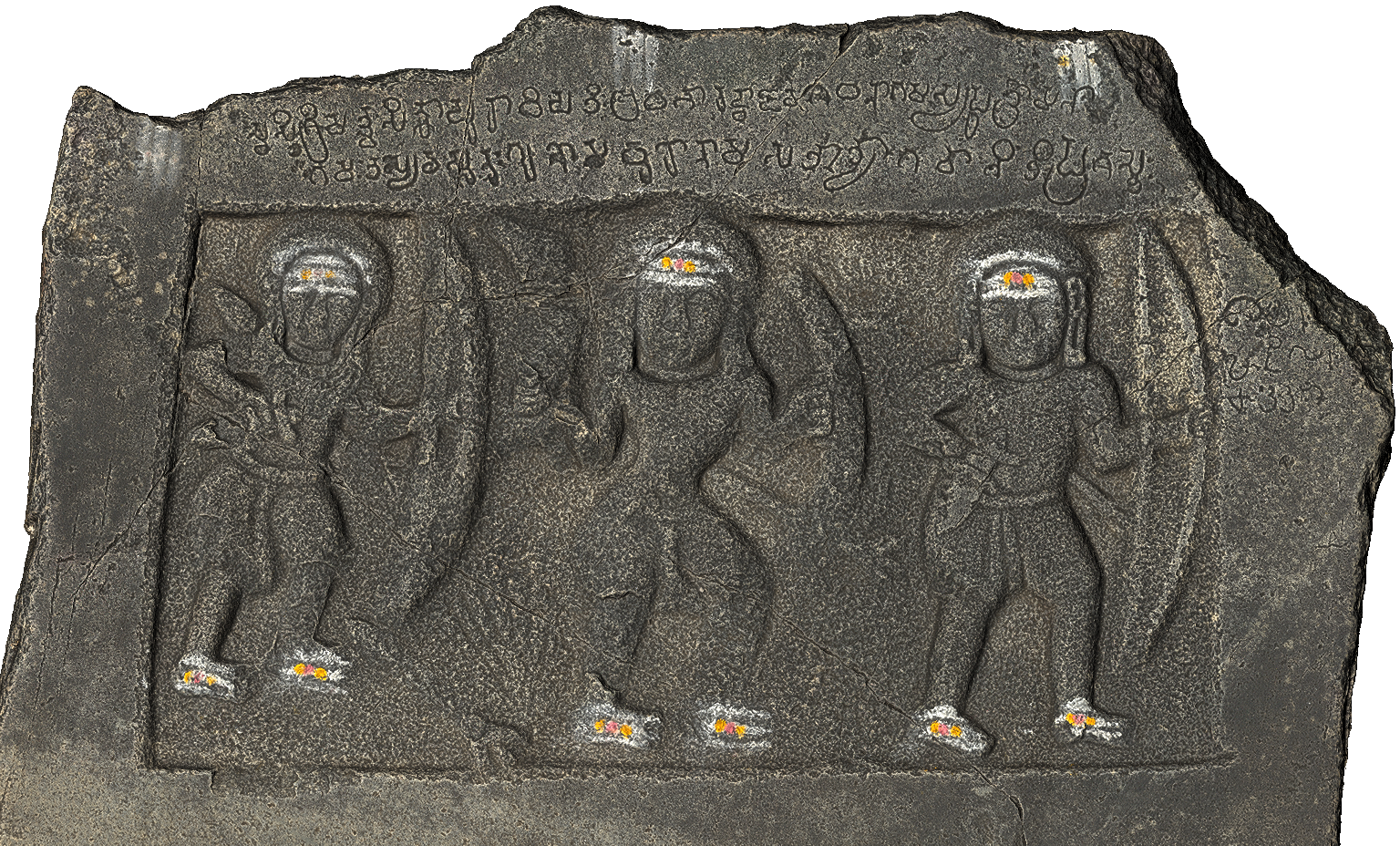
3D scanned image of The Tamatakal 500CE Gunamadhura Herostone

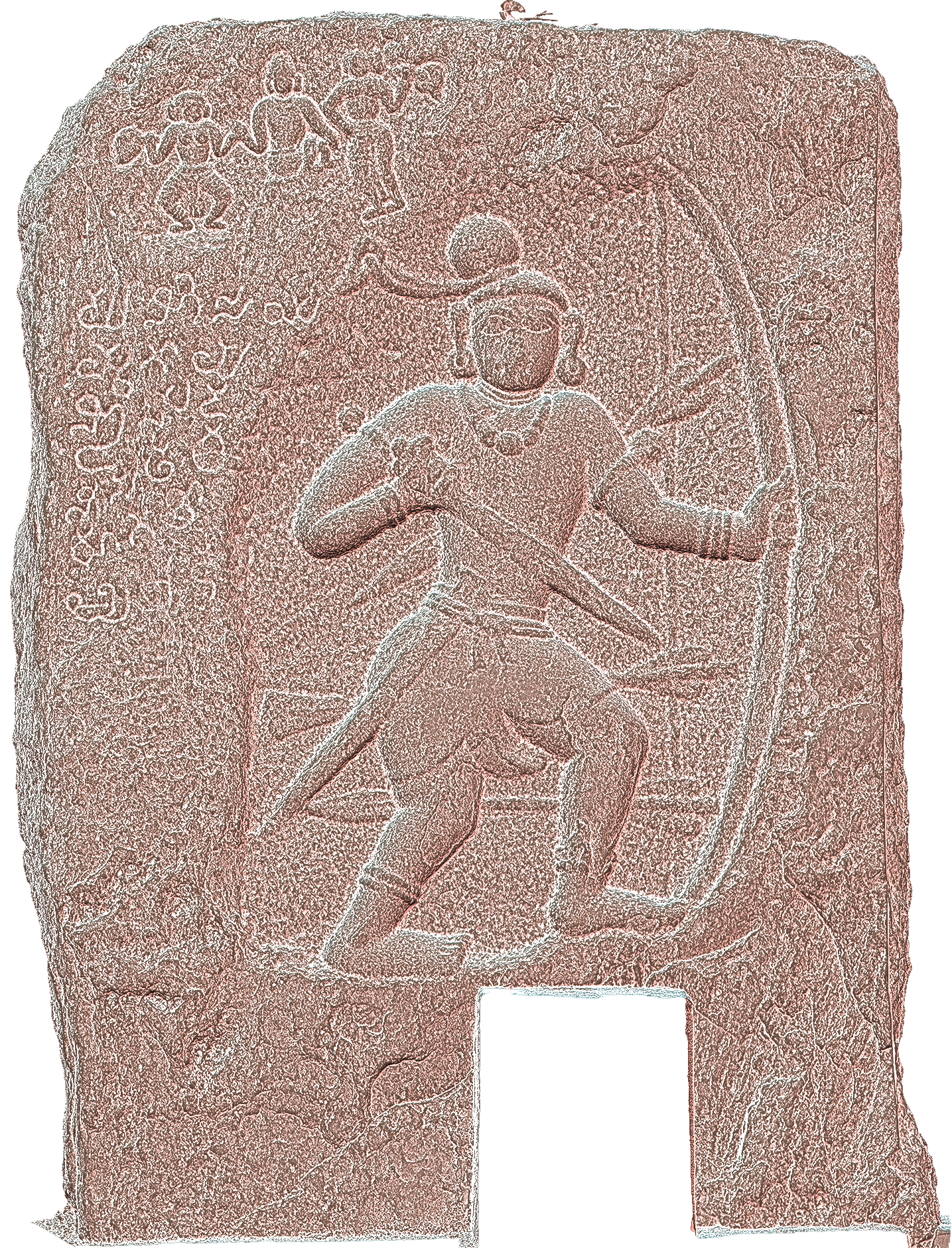
3D Scanned image of The Marasuru Madivala 9th-century Puniseyamma Hero-stone

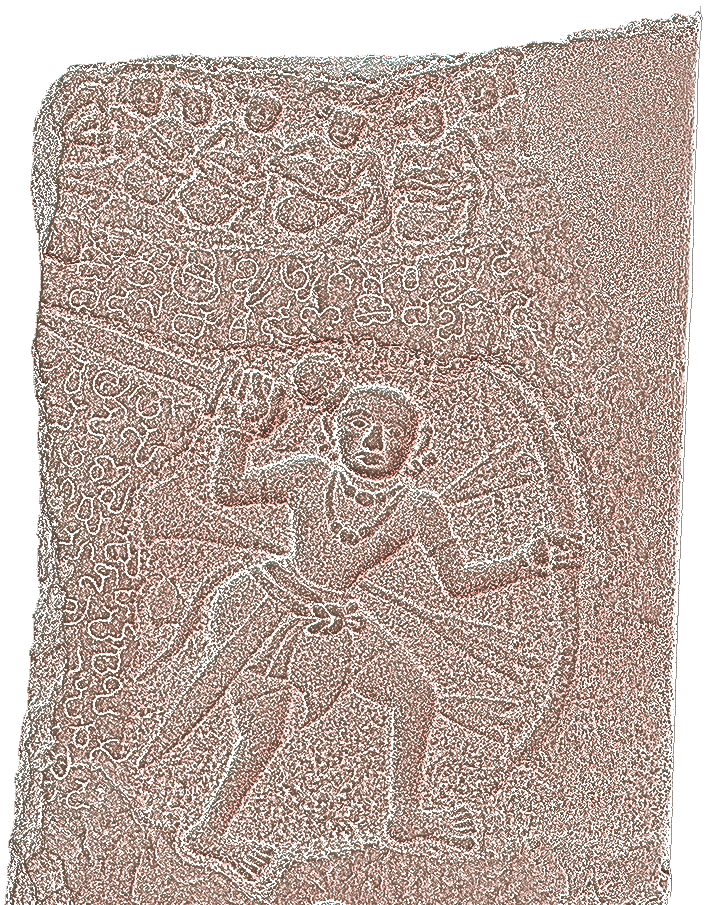
The Marasuru Madivala 10th-century Butuga "Irivabedenga" Hero-stone

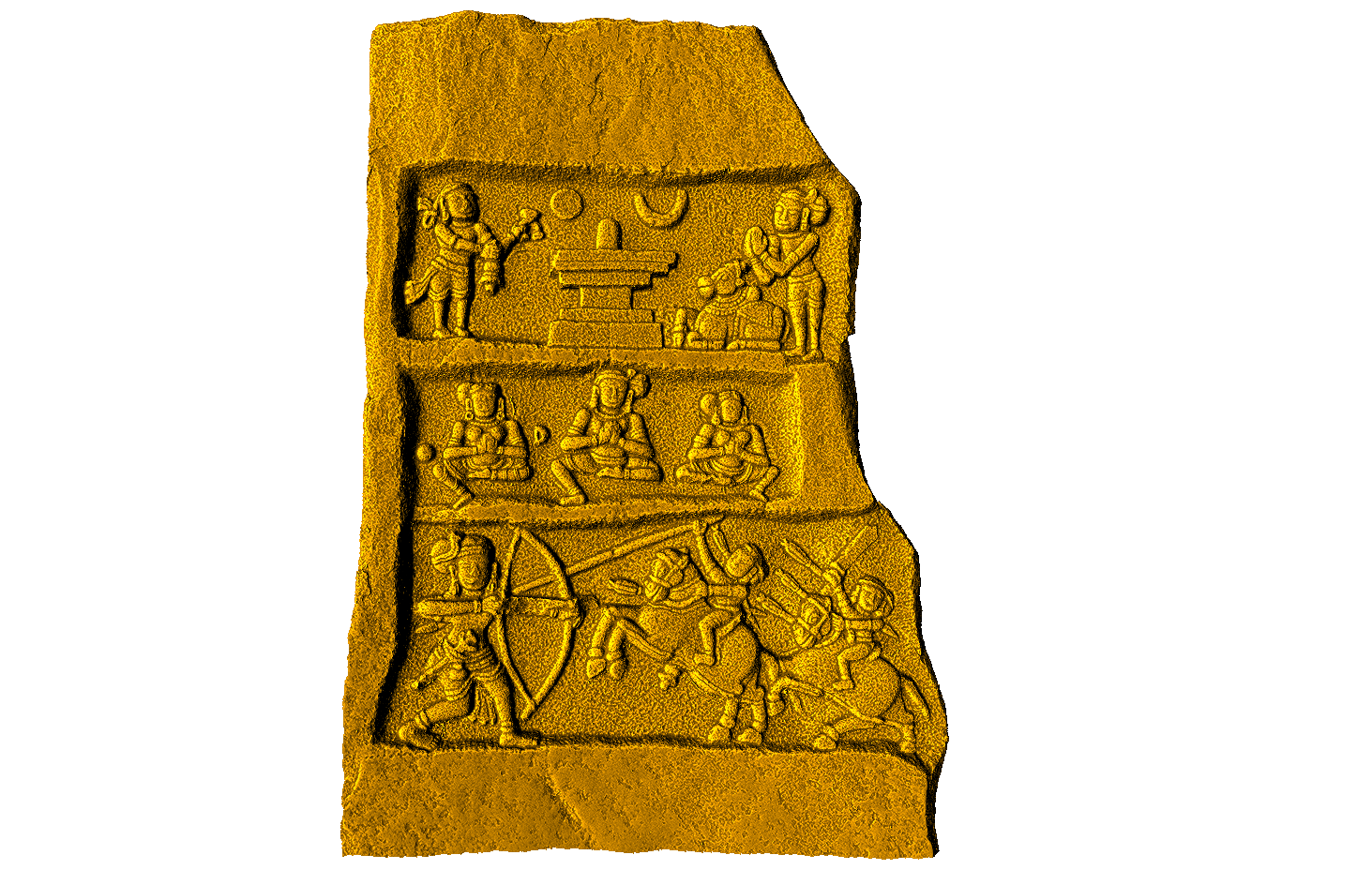
3D Scanned image of The Gulakamale Herostone

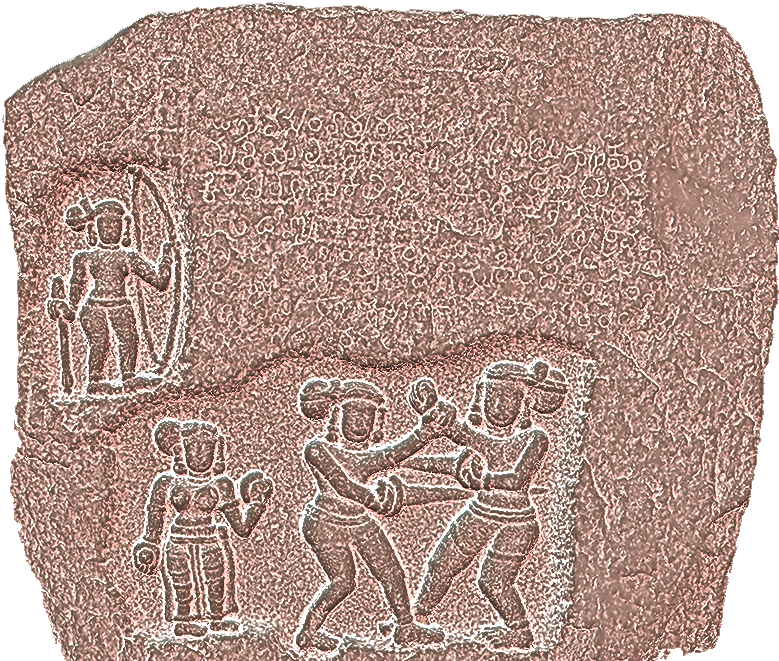
3D Scanned image of The Gulakamale 14th-century Kempanna Hero-stone

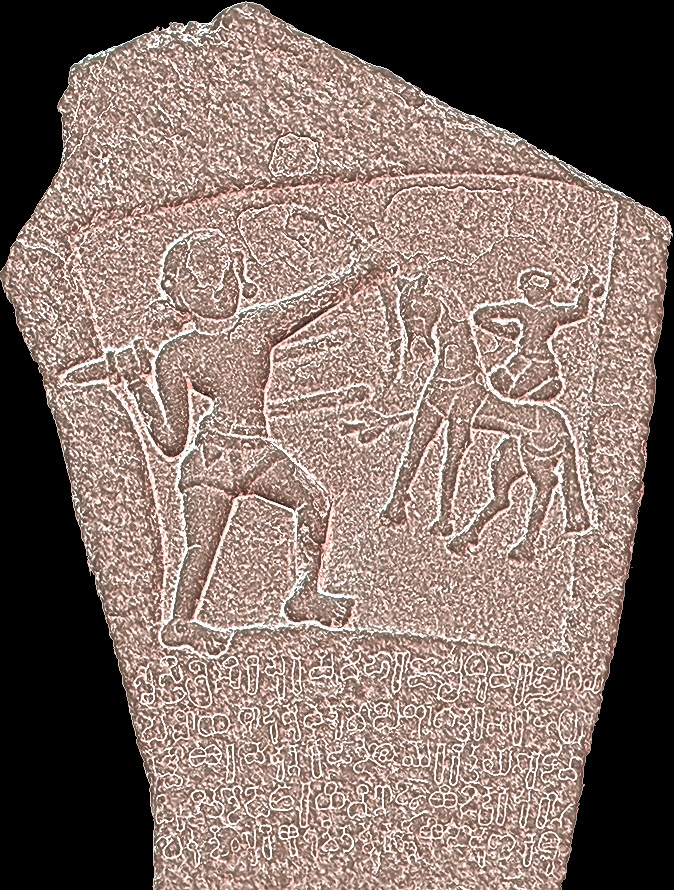
3D scanned image of the Hebbal-Kittayya hero-stone inscription

== See also ==
- Paliya
