= Kothapalle =

Kothapalle or Kothapalli or Kothapally may refer to:

== Places ==
=== Andhra Pradesh, India ===
- Kothapalle, NTR district
- Kothapalle, Nandyal district
- Kothapalle, Guntur district
- U. Kothapalli, a village in Kakinada district
- T. Kothapalli, a village in East Godavari district
- E. Kothapalli, a village in Kadapa district
- G. Kothapalli, a village in Prakasam district
- N. Kothapalli, a village in Nellore district
- Kothapally waterfalls, waterfalls in Visakhapatnam district

=== Telangana, India ===
- Kothapally, Karimnagar district
- Kothapally, Nizamabad district
- Kothapally, Ranga Reddy district
- Kothapalli (Haveli), a village northwest of Karimnagar City

== People ==
- Kothapalli Geetha, Indian politician and member of parliament from Araku Lok Sabha constituency, Andhra Pradesh
- Kothapalli Jayashankar, Indian academic and social activist from Telangana
