= Chinedu =

- Gender: Male
- Language: Igbo

Origin
- Meaning: Chi leads
- Region of origin: Igboland

Chinedu is a common Igbo masculine given name and surname. It means “chi leads”.

Notable people with the name include:

- Chinedu Achebe (born 1977), American football player
- Blessing Chinedu (born 1976), Nigerian football player
- Geoffrey Chinedu (born 1997), Nigerian footballer
- Stephen Chinedu (born 2000), Nigerian footballer
- Chinedu Sunday Chukwu (born 1997), Nigerian footballer
- Chinedu Ede (born 1987), German footballer
- Chinedu Ekene (born 2001), German-Nigerian footballer
- Chinedu Ezimora (born 1985), Nigerian football player
- Chinedu Ikedieze (born 1977), Nigerian actor, entrepreneur and investor
- Chinedu Obasi (born 1986), Nigerian footballer
- Chinedu Odozor-Onikeku (born 1977), Nigerian long jumper
- Chamberlain Chinedu Ogunedo, Anglican bishop in Nigeria
- Obiora Chinedu Okafor, Canadian legal scholar
- Charles Chinedu Okeahalam, economist and businessman
- Chinedu Oriala (born 1981), track and field sprint athlete
- Chinedu Udoji (1989–2018), Nigerian footballer
- Chinedu Udoka (born 1992), Nigerian footballer

== See also ==
- Chennadu
- Chindu (disambiguation)
- Chinnodu
