= Kothapally, Nizamabad district =

Kothapally Kothapalle
- Village
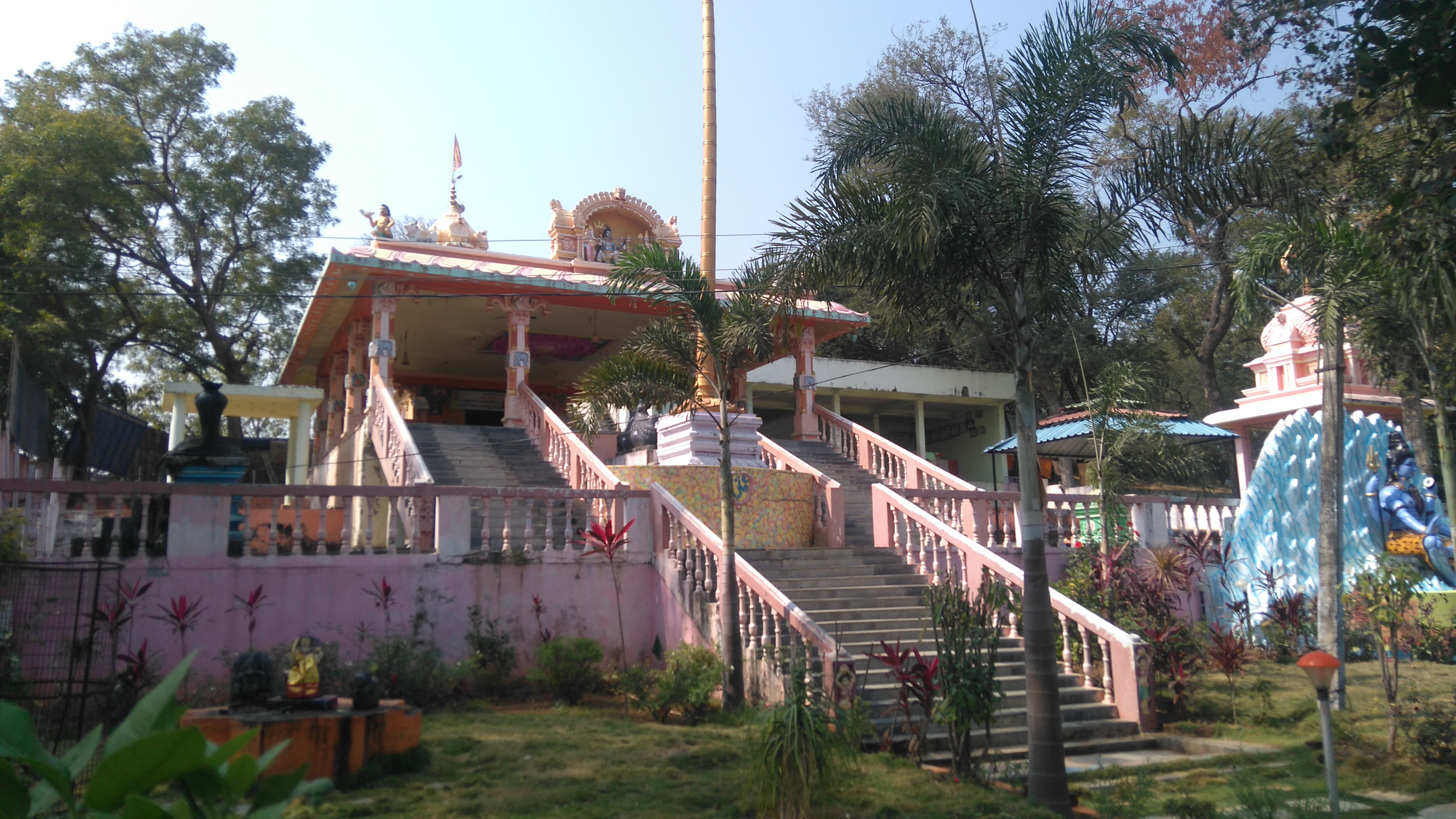
- Shree Rajarajeshwara Swamy Temple

- Location in Telangana, India Kothapally (India)
- Coordinates: 18°54′31.19″N 78°22′36.28″E
- Country: India
- State: Telangana
- District: Nizamabad
- Talukas: Mupkal

Government
  - Member of Parliament: Dharmapuri Arvind
  - Member of the Legislative Assembly: Vemula Prashanth Reddy

Languages
  - Official: Telugu
- Time zone: UTC+5:30 (IST)
- PIN: 503218
- Telephone code: 91-8463
- Vehicle registration: TG 16
- Literacy: 55.39%
- Sex ratio: 1163/1000 ♀/♂
- Lok Sabha constituency: Nizamabad
- Legislative Assembly constituency: Balkonda

Kothapally is a village in the Mupkal Mandal in the Nizamabad (Indhooru) district in the State of Telangana in India.

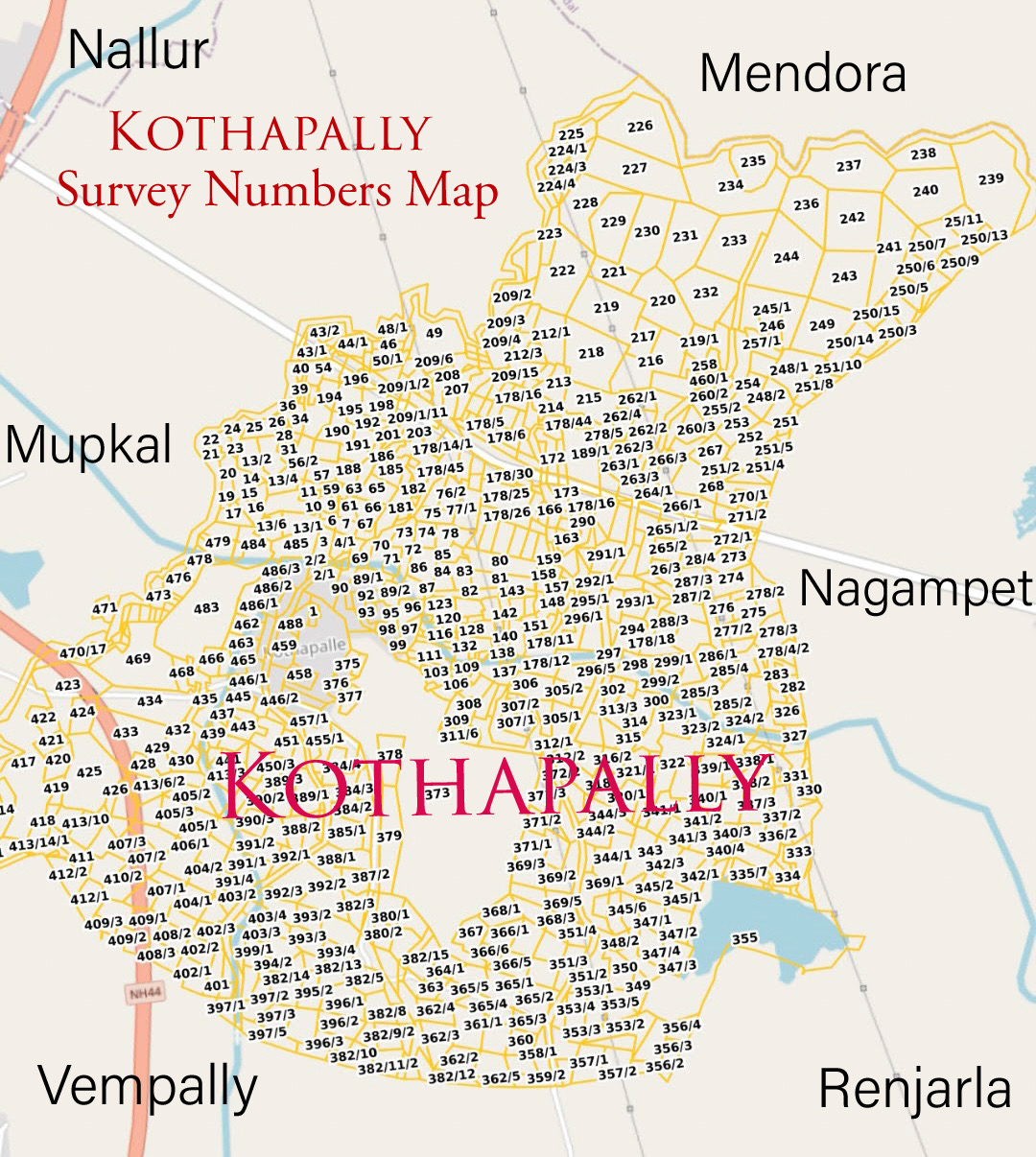
Kothapally map of survey no.s

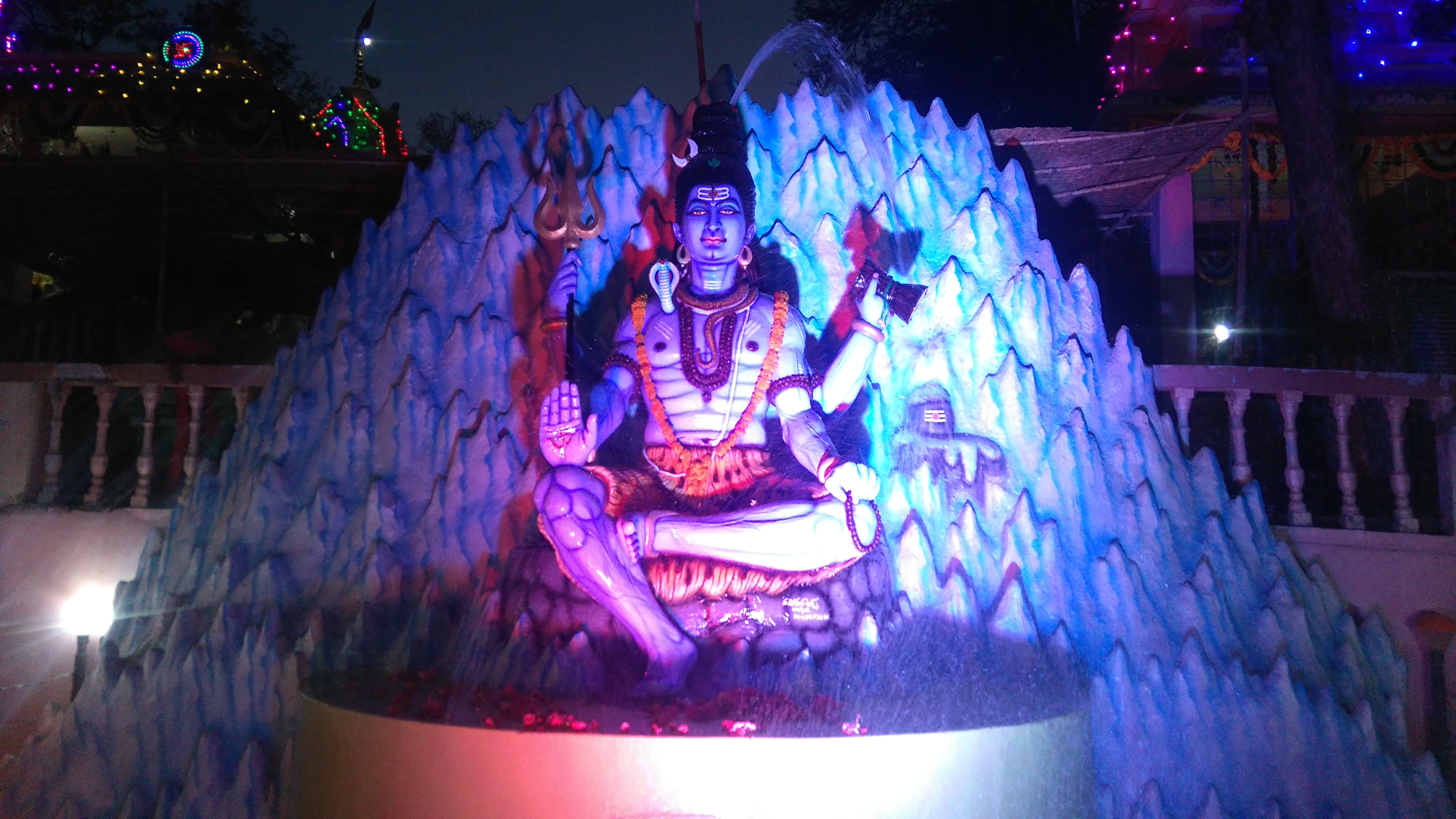
Concrete statue of Lord Shiva

There are 709 households and 2,661 population is there in village as per 2011 Census, in that 1,230 are male and 1,431 are female. The area of the village is about 8 km^{2} including agricultural land. Godavari river is 4 km from the village. Mupkal, Nalloor, Mendora, Nagampet, Renjarla, Vannel-B and Vempalli are the names of nearby villages.

Population Details(Growth)
Census	Households	Male	Female	Total	Literates
2001	673	1382	1469	2851	-
2011	709(+05.35%)	1230(-11.00%)	1431(-02.59)	2661(-06.66%)	1,474(55.39%)

== History ==
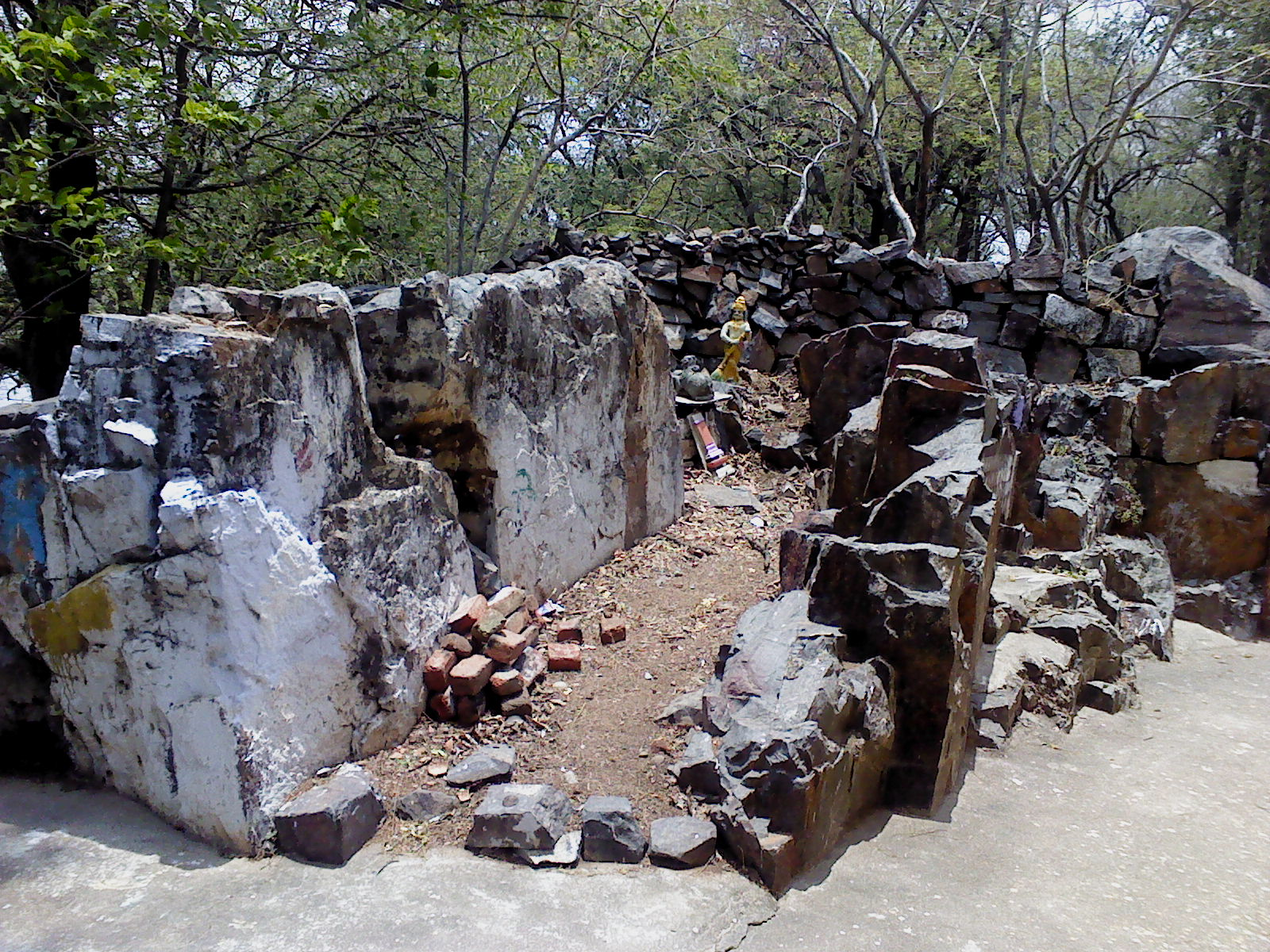
Ruins of old rock temple

The area which village is located under Asmaka janapada (Assaka). Of early Indian Vedic period, later it is under part of the Satavahana dynasty. Estimated at 500 years old, this village is home to the ancient temple of Lord Shiva. The exact year of the temple's construction or foundation is not known (it may be hundreds of years old) but the current structure was built in 1996. There is the location in the village having statues of hero stone (veeragallu), locally called as Mahadeva Sannidhi is a suspected Veeragallu (Hero Stone) with three sculptures, one with a warrior holding a bow in hands is about one feet tall, the second another warrior holding a shield is about two feet tall and the last a statue of Nandi(Sacred Bull) with broken head is one feet tall. this indicates that the village has a very prominent history. Present the hero stones are worshipping by the locals as the Mahadeva. Enugula Veeraswami a public servant in British India from Madras mentioned about the area and villages like Balkonda, Mupkal, Dudgam which are near to the village in July 1830 in his book named 'Kashi Yatra Charicham' about his pilgrimage to Varanasi. The age of the typical home in the village ranges from 100 to 200 years old.

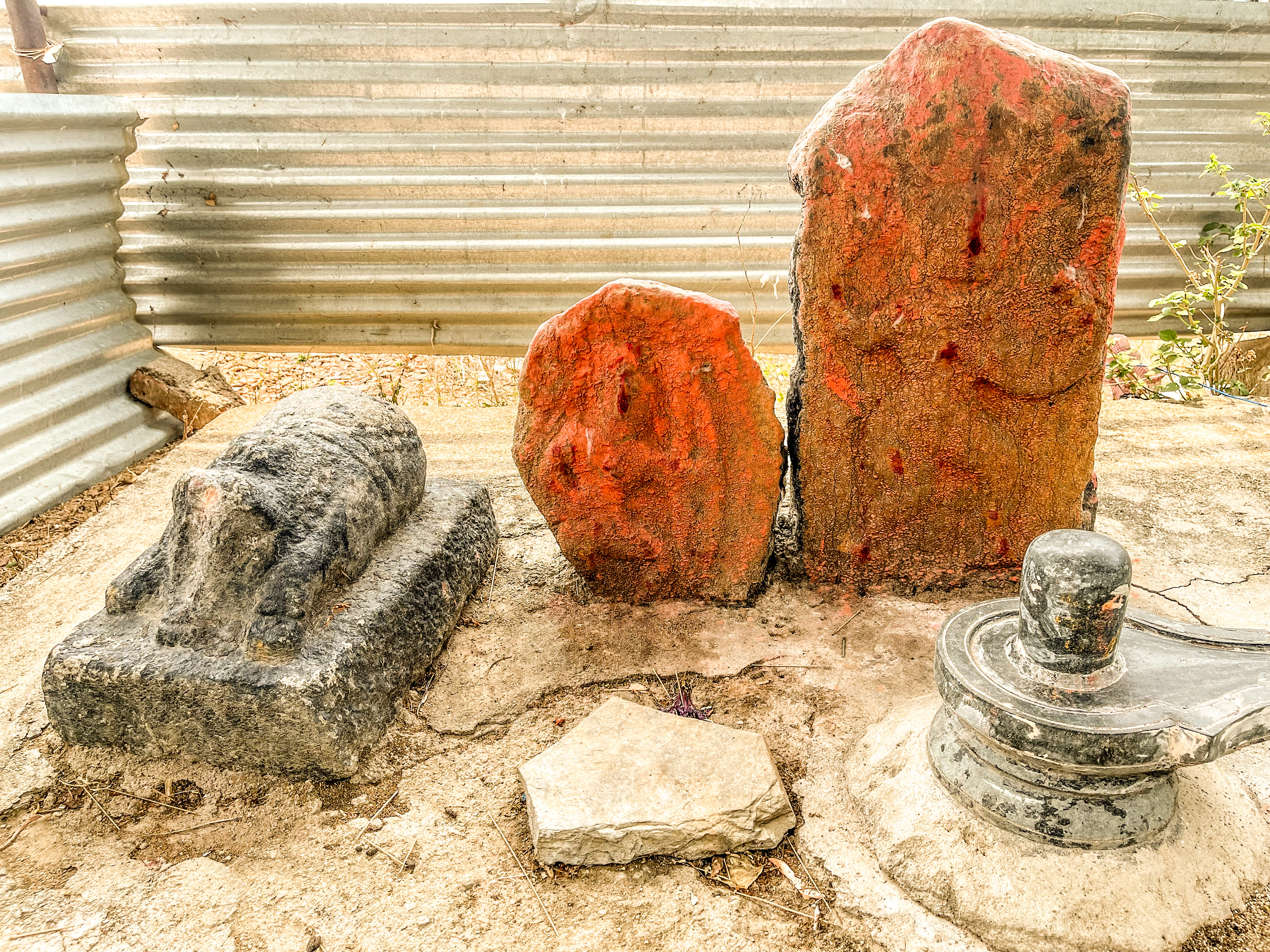
Veeragallu(hero stone) locally known as Mahadeva

== Education ==
The village has a 55% literacy rate and there is one government school for primary education. Most of the students study at B.Tech. and obtain other degrees in the cities of Hyderabad and Nizamabad. Many of government employees are there in this village and they have their own association for their activities. This village is famous in the district for being good in sports like cricket, and mainly in kabaddi it won many prizes in state and national level tournaments, many tournaments are also conducting in village.

== Transportation ==
The village is located 7 km from Balkonda. The towns located nearest to this village are Armoor (21 km), Nirmal (23 km), Metpally(40 km), Nizamabad (46 km), Adilabad(107 km) and Hyderabad (194 km). Shamshabad International Airport is the nearest airport located in Hyderabad and Armoor has the nearest railway station. The Bus service travelling from Armoor to Elkutoor TSRTC passes through the village twice a day. There are private automobiles that travel from Mupkal, a nearby village, with access to National Highway 44 (India)(Old NH 7) and additional bus service between Hyderabad, Nizamabad, Adilabad, Nirmal and Armoor.

== Culture ==
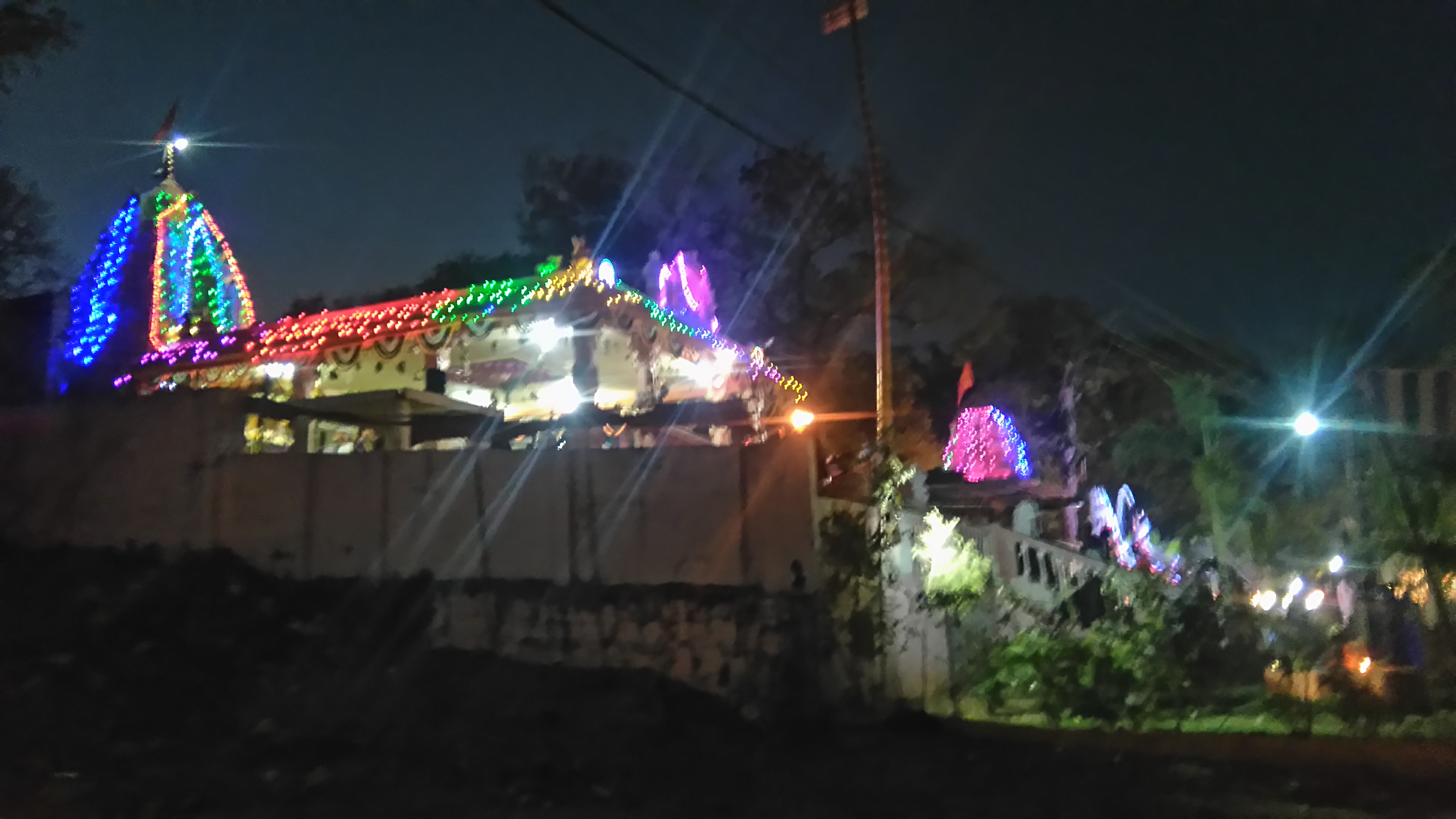
Sree Rajarajeshwara Swamy Temple on night of Shivaratri 2017

There are several Hindu temples are there in village mainly Sree Rajarajeshwara swamy Temple, Mahadeva Sannidhi, Hanuman Temple, Venkateshwara Sannidhi and there are eight Narasimha swamy Temples of various casts.Ugadi, Hanuman Jayanti, Mrigasira karthi, Ganesh Chaturthi, Dasara and Maha Shivaratri festivals are celebrated every year and Hindu and Islamic festivals are celebrated including village festivals. People belonging to different castes live peacefully together in the village. The main religions followed in the village are Hinduism 95%, Christianity 4% and Islam 1%. People belonging to different communities live together in friendship. Yearly in a specific season dramas are played for some days called Chindu Bhagavatham since many generations.

== Agriculture ==
Most of the people living in this village are farmers. The main crops cultivated are Paddy (వరి), Turmeric (పసుపు), Maize (మక్క లేదా మొక్కజొన్న), Pearl millet (సజ్జ), Jowar (జొన్న), Soya bean (సోయ) and the othar crops are Sesame (నువ్వు), Groundnut (పల్లికాయ లేదా వేరుశనగ). The water resources for cultivation are bore wells, agricultural wells, tanks and canals. Lakshmi canal (sourced from the Sriram Sagar project reservoir) passes through this village. This village has its own large tank called Rajeshwara tank also have other small tanks like Rameshwara and Lingam tanks.
