= Chindu =

Chindu may refer to:

- Chindu County, in Qinghai, China
- one of the divisions of Tamil music in the Pancha Marapu

== See also ==
- Chindu Bhagavatham, a drama form of Telangana, India
- Qindu District, in Shaanxi, China
