= Kothapally, Ranga Reddy district =

Kothapally
- Village
- Country: India
- State: Andhra Pradesh

Population (2009)
  - Total: 1,492

Languages
  - Official: Telugu
- Time zone: UTC+5:30 (IST)
- Telephone code: 040
- Vehicle registration: AP 26 X XXXX

Kothapally is a village in Ranga Reddy district in Andhra Pradesh, India. It falls under Yacharam mandal.
