= Mupkal, Nizamabad district =

Coordinates: 18°55′N 78°21′E

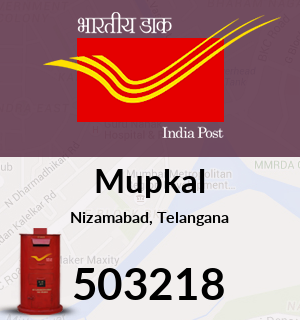
pincode

Mupkal is a village in Mupkal Mandal in Nizamabad district of the Indian state of Telangana. It is located 39 kilometres (24 mi) north east of Nizamabad and 2 kilometres (1.2 mi) north from Balkonda, 15 km north of Armoor, 20 km south from Nirmal.

Kisan Nagar (2 km), Kothpally (2 km), Nagapur (3 km), Jalalpur (4 km), Vempally (4 km) are the nearest villages. Mupkal is surrounded by Armoor Mandal towards South, Velpur Mandal to the South, Mortad Mandal to the East, Nandipet Mandal to the west. Armoor, Nirmal, Nizamabad, Koratla, Bhainsa are the closest cities.

== Demographics ==
The local language is Telugu. The total population is 6,296 people, including 3,106 males and 3,190 females living in 1,512 houses. Mupkal's area is 739 hectares (~2.85 sq. mi.).

== Transport ==
Nizamabad is the nearest town to Mupkal at a distance of 50 km. The two towns are connected by roads.

No rail station is within 10 km of Mupkal. The nearest station is in the nearby town of Armoor, 15 km away. The nearest major station is located in Nizamabad, 42 km away.

== Education ==
- New Horizons School, Mupkal
- MPPS Mupkal
- S C Jr College Mupkal Balkonda (MD)
- Zphs Mukpal
- Sri Saraswathi Sishu Mandhir
- Krishnaveni talent school
- Rishiniketan School

== Irrigation water & Mupkal Pump House (Zero Point) ==
The stage has been set for pumping Kaleshwaram Lift Irrigation Scheme (KLIS) water into the Sri Ram Sagar project. Pumping of water into the SRSP by adopting reverse pumping system would mark the culmination of a critical feat in the implementation of the SRSP Rejuvenation Scheme with an outlay of Rs 1,750 crore.

Two of the three pumphouses, which came up as part of the Rejuvenation Scheme at Rampur and Rajeswarraopet in Jagitial district, have become operational. Wet run of the pumping units at Mupkal pumphouse set up in the last leg of the reverse pumping network of the SRSP flood flow canal is in progress, according to the KLIS Engineer-in-Chief N Venkateswarlu.

Chief Minister Chandrasekhar Rao laid the foundation for the SRSP rejuvenation scheme at Pochampad on August 10, 2017, and works were completed in a record time of two years. The successful completion of the wet run of the pumping unit at Mupkal would facilitate pumping of water into the SRSP from 100th km point of the 122 km-long SRSP flood flow canal.

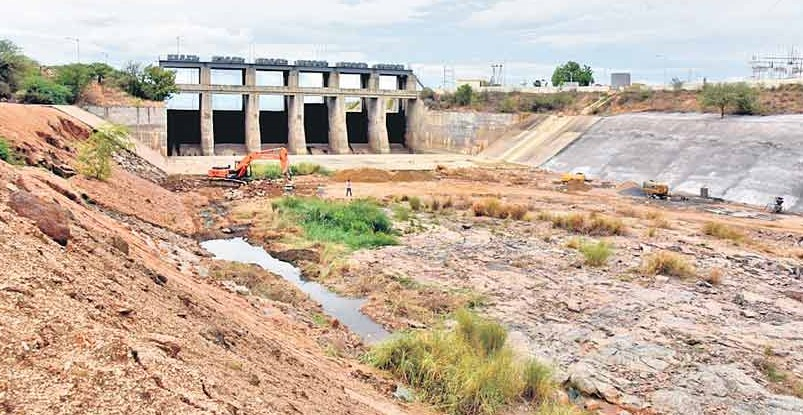

Lakshmi / Laxmi Canal with a total length of 3.5 km from Sri Ram Sagar Project reservoir to Peddavagu is used to irrigate 8,849 hectares (21,870 acres) of ayacut with a head discharge of 14.12 Cumecs (500 Cusecs) in Mupkal mandal, Nizamabad District.
