= T. Kothapalli =

Indian village in Andhra Pradesh

Coordinates: 16.664°N 82.205°E

T Kothapalli or T Kothapalle is a small village and a Gram Panchayat in I. Polavaram Mandal of East Godavari, Andhra Pradesh, India. A total of 2255 families are residing in it and its population is around 7500 as per 2011 Socioeconomic and Caste Census of India. The village is mostly dependent on agriculture. Out of 7500, 1510 people are agricultural laborers and 212 people are cultivators. Scheduled caste population is 31% of the total population of the village. Sex ratio of the village is 990 i.e. for every 1000 male there are 990 females. The literacy rate of the village is 65.5%.

The main agricultural crop in the village is paddy. The village has a community health center and contains Zilla Parishad High School.
