= Chinedu Ezimora =

Nigerian footballer (born 1985)

Personal information
- Full name: Chinedu Ezimora
- Date of birth: December 1, 1985 (age 40)
- Place of birth: Oyigbo, Nigeria
- Height: 1.90 m (6 ft 3 in)
- Position: Midfielder

Team information
- Current team: Heartland F.C.

Senior career*
Years	Team	Apps	(Gls)
2006–2010	Nasarawa United F.C.	98	(12)
2008	→ Enyimba Aba (loan)	22	(2)
2010–2011	Sharks F.C.		
2011–	Heartland F.C.		

International career^{‡}
2010–	Nigeria	1	(1)
- * Club domestic league appearances and goals as of 11 May 201 ‡ National team caps and goals as of 11 May 2011

Chinedu Ezimora (born 1 December 1985 in Oyigbo, Rivers State) is a Nigerian football (soccer) player currently with Heartland F.C. He is also a member of the Nigeria Beach Eagles.

== Career ==
Ezimora began his career with Nasarawa United F.C. and spent the 2008 season on loan at Enyimba International F.C. After a year with Port Harcourt-based side Sharks F.C., he signed with Heartland F.C. in May 2011.

== International career ==
Ezimora made his full senior debut on March 3, 2010, in the 5–2 win over Congo DR, where he scored one goal. A week later, he played against Niger as part of the home-based Super Eagles squad that won the WAFU Cup, scoring in the match against Benin.
