= Chennadu =

- village
- Country: India
- State: Kerala
- District: Kottayam

Population
  - Total: 5,000

Languages
  - Official: Malayalam, English
- Time zone: UTC+5:30 (IST)
- PIN: 686 581
- Telephone code: +914822------
- Vehicle registration: KL-35
- Nearest city: Erattupetta
- Lok Sabha constituency: Pathanamthitta
- Assembly constituency: Poonjar
- Panchayath: Poonjar

Chennadu (also spelled Chennad) is a small village 7 km away from Erattupetta in the Kottayam district of the Indian state of Kerala. The name is derived from chennu ninna nadu. It has a church, temple, high school and an LP school. Main agricultural crop is rubber. It stands as the most popular economic support for the village. It also has a government service centre.
