= Kothapally Waterfalls =

Waterfall in Andhra Pradesh, India

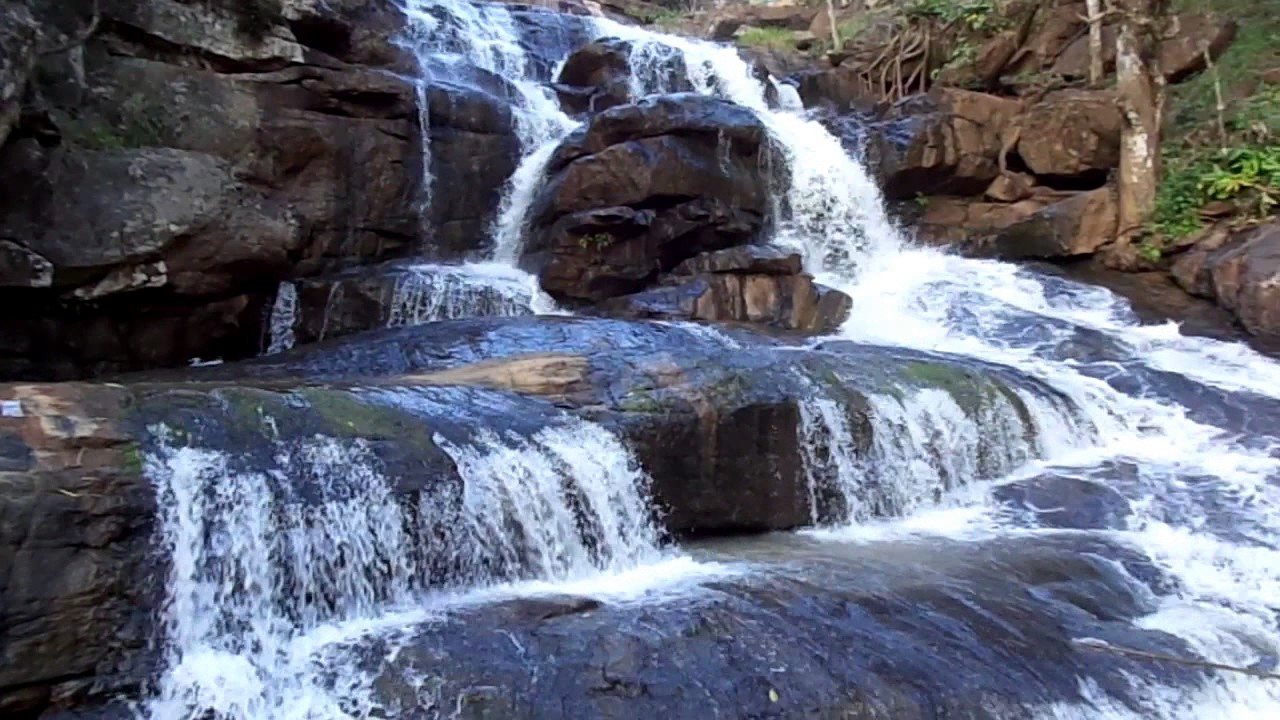
- Interactive map of Kothapally Waterfalls
- Location: Gangaraju Madugula, Alluri Sitharama Raju district, Andhra Pradesh, India
- Coordinates: 17°59′25.3″N 82°28′44.3″E

The Kothapally Waterfalls is a waterfall near the southeastern coast of India at Gangaraju Madugula, near Paderu in the Visakhapatnam district of Andhra Pradesh.

The falls were only recently discovered by a village boy, Vanthala Abbi. Although the falls lack any public infrastructure, they have become a tourist attraction in the Visakhapatnam district.

== Location ==
The Kothapally waterfalls are surrounded by Chintapalle Mandal to the south, Paderu Mandal to the east, Venus Bayalu Mandal to the north and Madugula Mandal to the east.

== See also ==
- List of waterfalls
- List of waterfalls in India
