= Charles Chinedu Okeahalam =

Charles Okeahalam
- Born: March 31, 1963 (age 63); St Pancras, London, England

Academic background
- Education: Queen Mary College, University of London Ph.D Economics (Applied Econometrics)
- Influences: Charles Goodhart

Academic work
- Discipline: Financial Economics, Financial Regulation

Charles Chinedu Okeahalam, clan name Ekwueme - economist and businessman, is a co-founder of the investment group, AGH Capital which was established in 2002 and has been involved in a number of transactions in Sub-Saharan Africa.

As a policy maker in a number of African countries, he has led various initiatives such as revision of prudential regulatory frameworks, deposit insurance schemes, capital market development and financing of transnational infrastructure networks.

== Background and career ==
He began his career as an investment analyst in 1986. From 1988 to 1990 he was a research fellow in economics at the University of Kent in Canterbury where he worked on the development of econometric models to forecast the demand for the Channel Tunnel and other infrastructure. He has also served as an advisor to a number of central banks, government ministries, the World Bank and the United Nations Economic Commission for Africa. From 1997 to 1998 he served as Financial Institutions Advisor to the Bank of Namibia, concurrently serving as a professor of banking and finance at the University of Namibia. In 1998 he directed an evaluation of the bank and non-bank prudential regulatory framework of Namibia, which led to the establishment of the Namibia Financial Institutions Supervisory Authority in 2001. In South Africa, he has served as key economic advisor to the ANC-led government on a number of initiatives. From 1999 to 2002 he served as lead advisor to the Reserve Bank of South Africa for the design and development of the South Africa deposit insurance scheme. In 2000 he served as the advisor to the Competition Commission on the attempted takeover of Standard Bank by Nedbank. He is an early proponent of the view that the most important economic variable for growth and governance in Africa is the supply of basic infrastructure.

== Academic contributions ==
Over the last two decades, he has made several contributions to the study of banking and finance, many of which were the first of their kind in Africa, in three areas:

- Application of econometric methods to industrial organisation in financial institutions and financial systems.
- Tests of market efficiency, integration and the role of institutions and governance.
- Financial sector regulation and policy.

== Awards and affiliations ==
In recognition of this work, he has received a number of awards and fellowships such as a Bank of England Houblon-Norman Senior Fellowship and a D.Sc (Higher Doctorate) in Financial Economics from the University of Exeter.

Prior to AGH, he was a professor of banking and finance at the University of the Witwatersrand in Johannesburg, South Africa. He served as an Honorary Professor at the same institution as well as a visiting professor at the University of Surrey. He is currently a visiting professor of practice at the School of Public Policy, London School of Economics and Political Science (LSE). In July 2024, he was awarded an Honorary Doctorate Degree by the University of Surrey.

== Commercial interests and public service ==
He has served as chairman / director of several commercial and public sector institutions, as member of the Governing Council of the United Nations Institute for Development Economics and Policy in Senegal, a member of council of the University of Cape Town and trustee of the African Union Foundation. From February 2016 to December 2018, he was appointed chairman of the Nigeria Mortgage Refinance Company (NMRC) Plc. He was the chairman of the International Board of Amref Health Africa from January 1, 2020 to December 31, 2025.
