= Kothapalle, Nandyal district =

Kothapalle
- Mandal
- Interactive map of Kothapalle
- Location in Andhra Pradesh, India
- Coordinates: 15.87791°N 78.588417°E
- Country: India
- State: Andhra Pradesh
- District: Nandyal
- Mandal: Kothapalle

Population
  - Total: 48,500

Languages
  - Official: Telugu
- Time zone: UTC+5:30 (IST)
- PIN: 518422
- Vehicle registration: AP

Kothapalle is a village in Nandyal district in the state of Andhra Pradesh in India.
