= Chindu Bhagavatham =

Drama art of Telangana, India

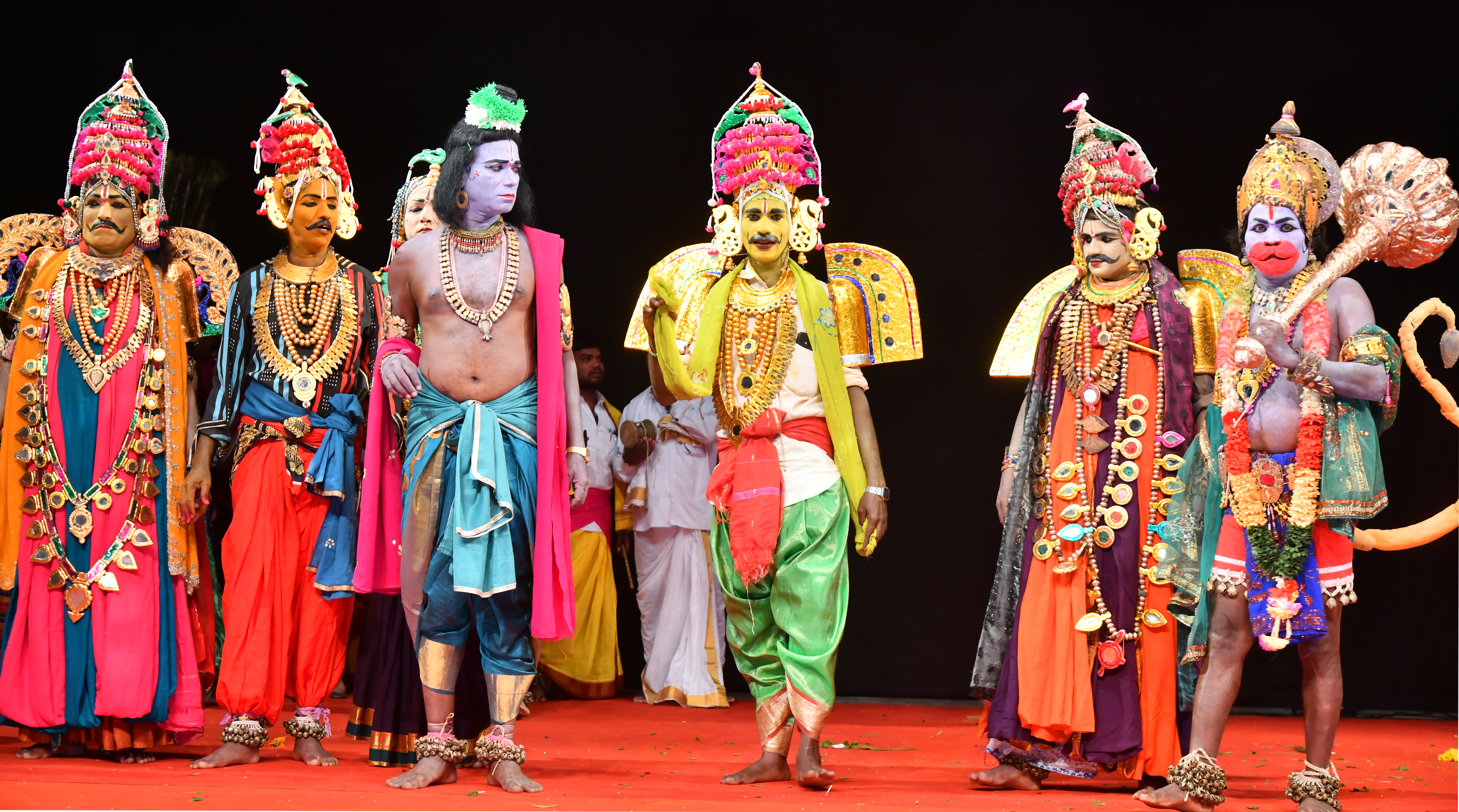
Performance of Chindu Yakshagana artists at Janapada Jatara cultural program organized by Department of Language and Culture, Government of Telangana at Ravindra Bharati, Hyderabad on 31st, 2019 as part of World Folk Day celebrations.

Chindu Bhagavatam is a drama art widely performed in Telangana, India. Chindu Bhagavatam is distantly related to Kattaikkuttu, Terukkuttu, Yakshaganam type of folk theater art forms in other parts of south India. The art form has evolved over time from being restricted to a small sub-sect within a community to being performed all over the region and utilised by the State government.

== History ==
The art goes that within the ‘Madiga’ community, a sect considered itself ‘Pedda Madiga’ (Elder Madiga) and another sect that was living on begging, performing Yakshaganas, as ‘Chinna Madigas’, (Lower Madiga). These Chindu Bhagavatas were not permitted to perform beyond their own community. A lot has changed since then. Chindu Yellamma, a respected icon from Nizamabad, was invited to perform with her troupe at Ravindra Bharathi by the erstwhile Dance Academy headed by Nataraja Ramakrishna. The academy had also published a small booklet on this art and the Chindu Bhagavatas at that time.

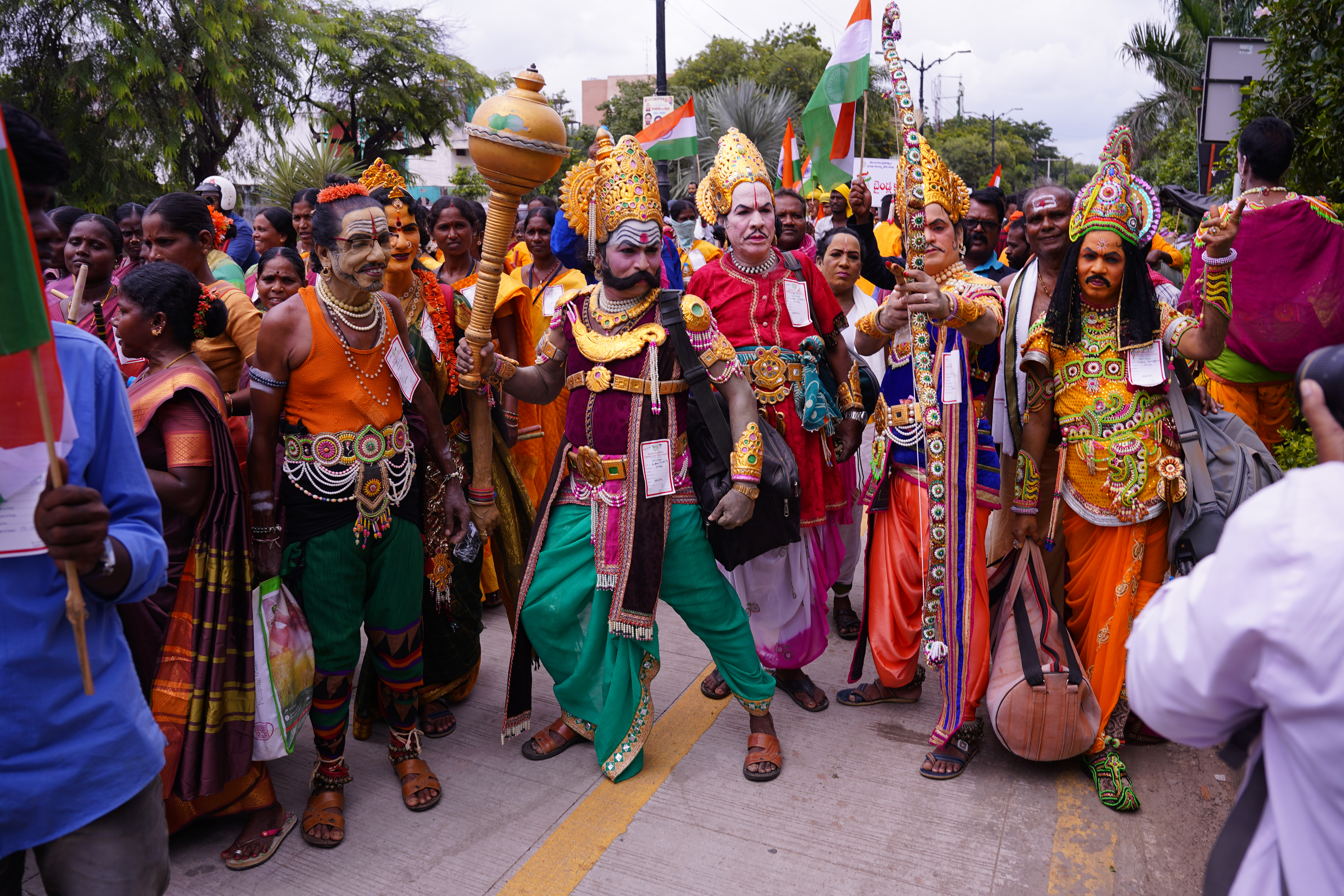
Chinduu Yakshagana Artists in Telangana Jateeya Samaikyatha Vajrotsavalu (17 September 2022) 01

The word ‘Chindu’ in Telugu means ‘jump’. As their presentation is interspersed with leaps and jumps, it gained the name of Chindu Bhagavatam. Most of the stories narrated are from ‘Bhagavatam’. Gaddam Sammayya, a leader of these troupes, claims that though the Chindu Bhagavatas were seen as a lowly section of society, they trace their origin to Jamba Mahamuni, and believe their clan is the most ancient sect. "Hence most of our dramas open with 'Jamba Puranam' with the opening pallavi that goes ‘Ekkuvani Mari Palukabokumura, Ekkuvevvaru Mari Telisi Palukumura’ (don’t speak of being high, speak knowing who is higher)," he says.

== Present ==
Contemporary plays based on the Bhagavata were traditionally passed down orally across generations until playwrights such as Chevirala Bhagayya, Jilla Venkatadasu, Burugupally Venkatanarasayya Panthulu, and Yadavadasu began to document and refine them. These writers introduced new themes, enhanced the sophistication of the scripts, and added metrical verses, transforming these performances into full-fledged theatrical productions. "Some of us are educated up to ‘Peddabalasiksha’ and can read and memorize the scripts," explains performer Sammayya.

Today, there are around 800 Chindu Bhagavatam troupes, predominantly composed of skilled male performers. Each troupe member is trained in various theatrical arts, including makeup, singing, and playing musical instruments like the harmonium, cymbals, and dholak. every family within their community is trained in the Yakshagana prakriya, or technique, and that the performers dedicate their lives to learning and staging over 300 mythological themes. The performances incorporate traditional Yakshagana elements, blending song, verse, and dramatic narration, and are staged in village settings, often under trees or at crossroads, drawing large audiences. Performances sometimes take place in local venues like the ‘Gadies’ of Deshmukhs or ‘Chavadi Kottaalu’ in Telangana's rural areas, running through the night until dawn, with makeup applied on the spot.

Before each performance, they place a picture of Goddess Yellamma and travel through villages collecting offerings, typically food or clothing. Performances are generally avoided during the monsoon season. Outside of their art, many Chindu Bhagavatas work as farm laborers or in fishing and rope-making. The government has engaged their services for welfare programs, using their performances to promote messages on environmental protection, sanitation, family planning, literacy, and disease awareness.
